= National Velvet =

1935 novel by Enid Bagnold

- First edition (UK)
- Author: Enid Bagnold
- Illustrator: Laurian Jones
- Language: English
- Publisher: Heinemann (UK); William Morrow (US)
- Publication date: 1935
- Publication place: United Kingdom
- Pages: 306

National Velvet is a novel by Enid Bagnold (1889–1981), first published in 1935. It was illustrated by Laurian Jones, Bagnold's daughter, who was born in 1921. The novel tells the story of a teenaged girl who wins a horse racing competition. It was a best-seller, and adapted into a highly successful 1944 film and a 1960-62 television series.

== Plot summary ==
National Velvet is the story of a 14-year-old girl named Velvet Brown, who trains and rides her horse, named The Piebald, to victory in the Grand National steeplechase.

The novel focuses on the ability of ordinary people, particularly women, to accomplish great things. Velvet is a teenager in the late 1920s, living in a small English coastal village in Sussex, dreaming of one day owning many horses. She is a high-strung, shy, nervous child with a delicate stomach. Her mother is a wise, taciturn woman who was once famous for swimming the English Channel; her father is a butcher.

Velvet's best friend is her father's assistant, Mi (Michael) Taylor, whose father – as Mrs. Brown's swimming coach – helped her cross the channel. Mi formerly worked in stables and is familiar with the horse racing world. One day they both watch The Piebald jump over a five-foot-high cobbled fence to escape a field. Mi remarks that "a horse like that'd win the National". Velvet becomes obsessed with winning the horse in an upcoming raffle and riding him to greatness.

In addition to inheriting several horses from one of her father's customers, Velvet also wins The Piebald, her dream horse. After riding him in a local gymkhana, she and Mi seriously consider entering the Grand National steeplechase at Aintree racecourse and train the Piebald accordingly.

Mi uses his connections to the horse training/racing world and obtains a fake clearance document for Velvet in the name of James Tasky, a Russian jockey. Velvet wins the race, but is disqualified for dismounting too soon after she slides off the saddle due to exhaustion. Her gender is discovered in the first-aid station.

The racing world is both dismayed and fascinated by a young girl's winning its toughest race. Velvet and The Piebald become instant celebrities, with Velvet and her family nearly drowning in notoriety (echoing her mother's unsought fame after swimming the English Channel), complete with merchandising. Velvet strongly objects to the publicity, saying The Piebald is a creature of glory who should not be cheapened in tabloid trash and newsreels. She insists that she did not win the race, the horse did, and she simply wanted to see him go down in history. The National Hunt Committee finds no evidence of fraud, exonerates all involved, and Velvet and her family return to their ordinary lives; or rather, Velvet goes on "to her next adventures", for clearly she is a person to whom great things happen.

=== Film adaptation ===
The novel was made into a more or less faithful, highly successful film version in 1944, starring twelve-year-old Elizabeth Taylor and Mickey Rooney, with Donald Crisp, Anne Revere and a young Angela Lansbury. The screenplay was written by Helen Deutsch. In 2008 the film was voted the ninth best American film in the sports genre. In the film the horse, who was solid coloured, hence not a piebald (British English) or pinto (American English), was renamed The Pie.

=== Radio adaptation ===
National Velvet was presented on Hallmark Playhouse on the CBS radio network on 6 October 1949. The half-hour adaptation starred Roddy McDowell and Anne Whitfield.

=== Television adaptation ===
From 1960 to 1962, the novel was adapted into a thirty-minute American television series, with Lori Martin, Ann Doran and James McCallion. In this version her horse was named King. This aired on NBC for 52 episodes.

=== Film sequel ===
A 1978 film sequel, International Velvet, was made starring Tatum O'Neal as Sarah Brown, a young orphaned American teenager living in England with her aunt Velvet Brown (Nanette Newman) after Sarah's parents die in a car accident. Sarah and Velvet purchase the descendant of The Pie after Sarah earns the money by working for Velvet's boyfriend John. They name him Arizona Pie after Sarah's home state. Working with Arizona Pie, Sarah is selected to represent Britain in the equine three-day Olympic event. While working with the horse with trainer Captain Johnson (Anthony Hopkins), she falls for an American competitor, Scott Saunders (Jeffrey Byron). Though distracted by him, she wins the event. Later, after getting engaged to Scott, Sarah returns to England and presents the medal to her aunt Velvet as a keepsake and introduces her and John to Scott.
