= National Velvet (film) =

1944 Technicolor sports film directed by Clarence Brown

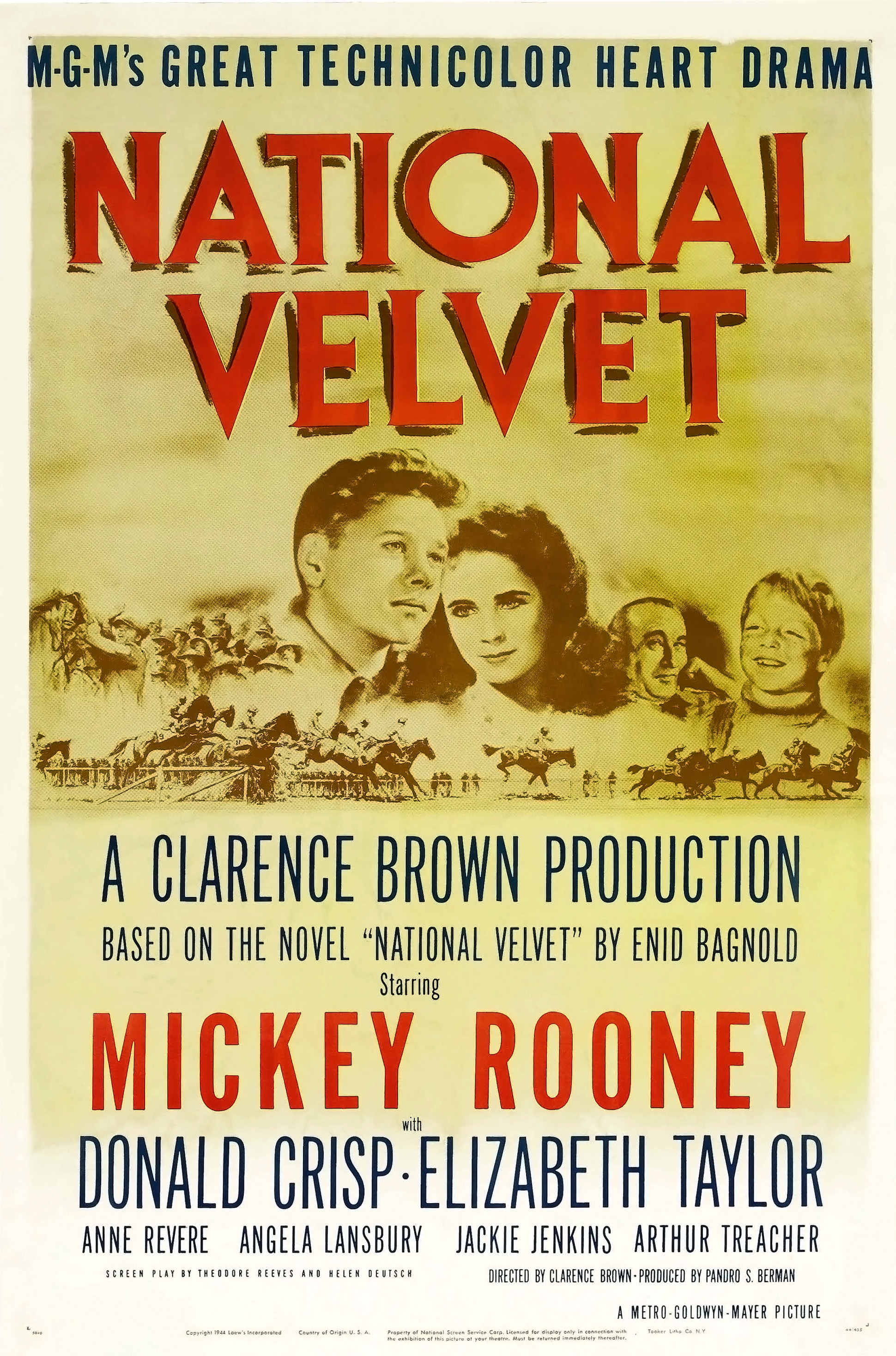
- Theatrical release poster
- Directed by: Clarence Brown
- Screenplay by: Helen Deutsch
- Based on: National Velvet; 1935 novel by Enid Bagnold
- Produced by: Pandro S. Berman
- Starring: Mickey Rooney; Donald Crisp; Elizabeth Taylor; Angela Lansbury; Anne Revere; Reginald Owen; Terry Kilburn
- Cinematography: Leonard Smith
- Edited by: Robert J. Kern
- Music by: Herbert Stothart
- Production company: Metro-Goldwyn-Mayer
- Distributed by: Loew's, Inc
- Release dates: December 14, 1944 (New York City); January 26, 1945 (United States)
- Running time: 123 minutes
- Country: United States
- Language: English
- Budget: $2,770,000
- Box office: $5,840,000

National Velvet is a 1944 American Technicolor sports film directed by Clarence Brown and based on the 1935 novel of the same name by Enid Bagnold, about a young English girl who rides a racehorse. It stars Mickey Rooney, Donald Crisp, Angela Lansbury, Anne Revere, Reginald Owen, and an adolescent Elizabeth Taylor.

In 2003, National Velvet was selected for preservation in the United States National Film Registry by the Library of Congress as being "culturally, historically, or aesthetically significant." In 2006, the film was ranked 24th on the American Film Institute's list of most inspirational movies.

== Plot ==
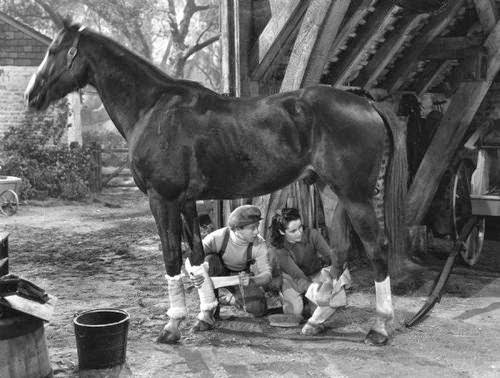
Mi and Velvet bandaging the Pie's legs

Velvet Brown, a 12-year-old horse-crazy girl, lives with her family in Sewels, a village in Sussex, England. After winning a troublesome stallion in a raffle organized by its owner to get rid of him, she dreams of training him for the Grand National steeplechase. Penniless young drifter Mi Taylor, who discovered Mrs. Brown's name and address among his late father's effects, arrives at the Brown farm. Mrs. Brown is unwilling to allow Mi to trade on his father's good name and remains vague about their connection. Nevertheless, she convinces her husband to hire Mi as a store helper and allow him to live in a room in the barn. One night Mi intends to steal money from the Browns but feeling remorseful, cannot bring himself to do it and returns the money. It is eventually revealed that Mi's career as a steeplechase jockey ended in a collision that resulted in another jockey's death. The accident left Mi afraid to ride.

Velvet names her horse "Pie" because his previous owner called the troublesome stallion a pirate. Seeing Pie's potential, she pleads with Mi to train him for the Grand National. To cover the costs, Mrs. Brown gives Velvet the prize money she won years ago for swimming the English Channel. Velvet and Mi train Pie and enter him into the race.

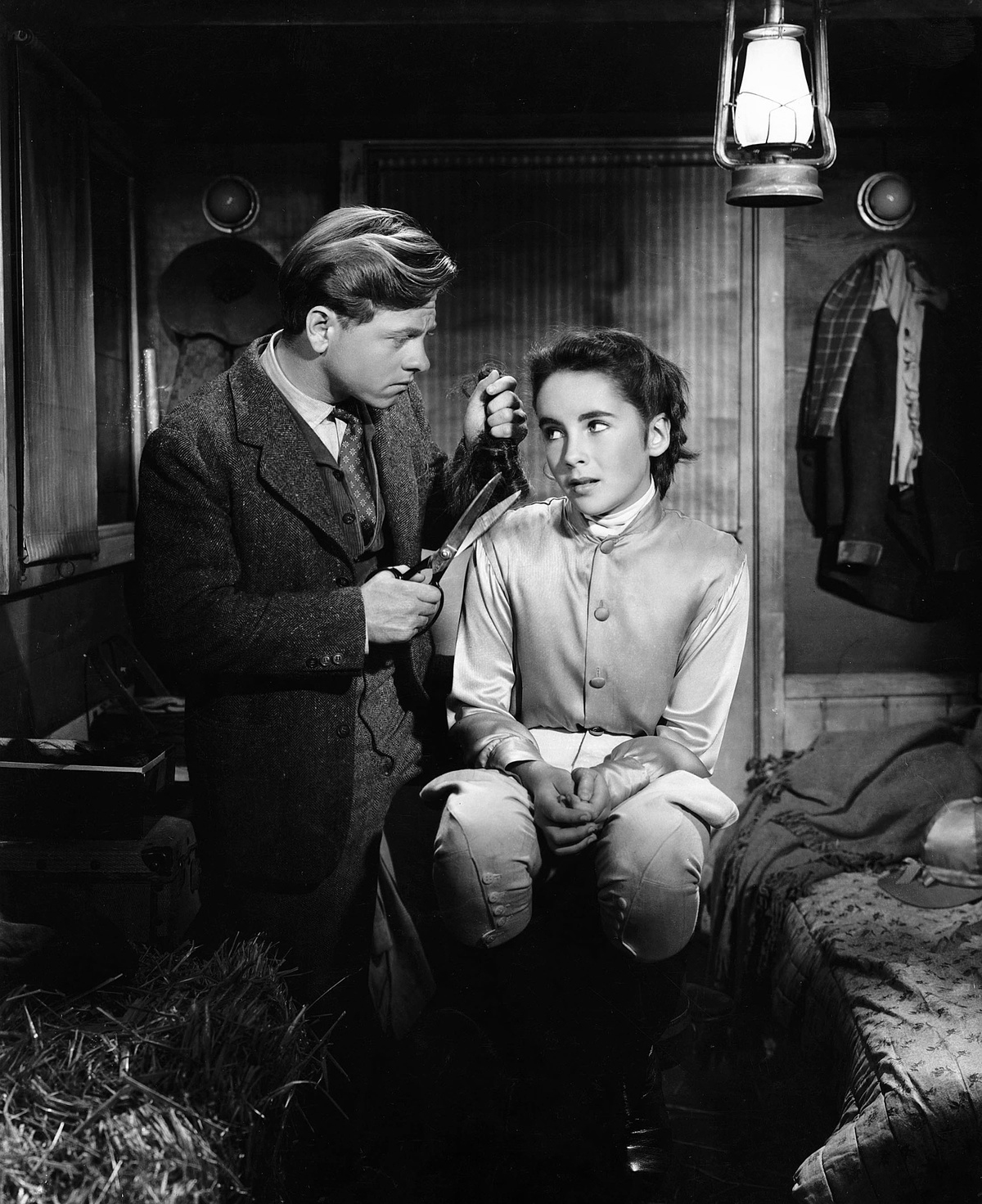
Mi cuts Velvet's hair before the race

Mi and Velvet travel to the Grand National. Mi hires a professional jockey, but Velvet senses he lacks faith in Pie and will lose. She dismisses the jockey, leaving them without a rider. Unable to overcome his fear of riding, Mi realizes they have no jockey until he discovers Velvet wearing the jockey silks, determined to ride Pie herself. As the race unfolds, Velvet and Pie clear all hurdles. Exhausted, Velvet collapses after crossing the finish line first. When officials tend to her, they discover that the jockey is a girl, leading to Velvet and Pie's disqualification.

When it is discovered that the jockey is a girl, Velvet becomes a media sensation and receives lucrative offers to travel to Hollywood and be filmed with Pie. To her father's disappointment, she declines all offers, claiming that Pie would not understand the scrutiny. She says that she entered the Grand National because Pie deserved a chance for greatness. Velvet chooses a normal life for herself and her horse.

Sometime later, Mi takes his leave without bidding Velvet goodbye. She is heartbroken, but Mrs. Brown says it was time for him to resume his old life. She gives Velvet permission to tell Mi that his father coached Mrs. Brown to swim the English Channel. Astride Pie, Velvet catches Mi at the top of a hill, where she tells him about his father.

== Cast ==
- Mickey Rooney as Michael "Mi" Taylor
- Donald Crisp as Mr. Herbert Brown
- Elizabeth Taylor as Velvet Brown
- Anne Revere as Mrs. Araminty Brown
- Angela Lansbury as Edwina Brown
- Jackie 'Butch' Jenkins as Donald Brown
- Juanita Quigley as Malvolia "Mally" Brown
- Arthur Treacher as Race Patron
- Reginald Owen as Farmer Ede
- Norma Varden as Miss Sims
- Terry Kilburn as Theodore "Ted"
- Arthur Shields as Mr. Hallam
- Aubrey Mather as Entry official
- Alec Craig as Timothy "Tim"
- Eugene Loring as Ivan Taski
- Dennis Hoey as Mr. Greenford
- Matthew Boulton as Entry official
- Gerald Oliver Smith as a cameraman
- King Charles as the horse, The Pie
- Harry Allen as van driver (uncredited)
- Mona Freeman as schoolgirl (uncredited)
- Jane Isbell as Schoolgirl Jane (uncredited)
- Moyna MacGill as racetrack spectator (uncredited)
- Gordon Richards as Doctor (uncredited)

Kilburn is the last surviving credited cast member.

== Production notes ==
An 18-year-old Gene Tierney, who was then appearing on Broadway, was offered the role of Velvet Brown in 1939. Production was delayed, however, so Tierney returned to Broadway. Much of the film was shot in Pebble Beach, California, with the most-scenic views on the Pebble Beach Golf Links (with golf holes visible in the background). Elizabeth Taylor was given "The Pie" as a birthday gift after filming was over.

This was the first of two films casting Elizabeth Taylor and Anne Revere. The other film, A Place in the Sun, featured Revere as the mother of Taylor's love interest, played by Montgomery Clift. In that film, however, the two actresses never shared the screen with each other in any scene.

Mickey Rooney's scenes were shot first in one month allotted by the U.S. Army before Rooney was inducted in June 1944.

Mickey Rooney played a similar role in the film The Black Stallion (1979).

=== Differences from the book ===
The screenplay was written by Helen Deutsch. The film differs from the book in a number of respects. For example, Velvet's horse in the book is a piebald, and thus is given the name "The Piebald" or "The Pie" for short. In the movie, Pie is a chestnut, and another explanation for his name was given. Velvet, in the book, is a sickly child who is given to great imagination and spirit; her father is stern and given to anger, but the mother, who once swam the English Channel, is stronger still and stands up to him. Since her days as a swimmer, she has become a large woman and weighs 16 stone—224 pounds (102 kg) at the time of the story, and warns Velvet never to allow herself to be burdened by weight. In the book Mr. and Mrs. Brown also have a 15-year-old daughter named Meredith, in addition to Edwina, Malvolia, Velvet, and Donald. The Meredith character does not appear in the movie. In the book Mi is simply Mr. Brown's assistant and states several times he cannot ride, has never even been on a horse. His father was the swimming coach who had trained Mrs. Brown for the English Channel, but Mi couldn't swim either and his father constantly berated him about it. In the novel, Velvet poses as Russian-British jockey James Tasky, who was unable to race because his horse died as it was being brought from Estonia, and Mi arranged to take his official papers allowing him in the Grand National. There is a reference to a professional jockey hired by Mi to race at the Grand National who is said to have finished in 4th place at the previous event; it is possible this character is a reference to 1932 Ascot Gold Cup disgraced competitor Arthur Pasquier.

== Song ==
- "Summertime" - Elizabeth Taylor, Angela Lansbury, Juanita Quigley, MGM Studio and Orchestra Chorus Girls, and Norma Varden

== Reception ==
Writing in The Nation in 1944, critic James Agee stated, " ... in a sense—the sense of all the opportunities, or obligations, which were either neglected, with or without reason, or went unrealized—almost the whole picture is a blunder mitigated chiefly but insufficiently by the over-all charm of the story and affectionateness of the treatment, by Rooney's all but unimprovable performance ... and by a couple of dozen piercing moments—which may have transfixed me exclusively—from Miss Taylor." Leonard Maltin gave the film four of four stars: "Outstanding family film ... Taylor is irresistible, Rooney was never better, and they're surrounded by a perfect supporting cast." Leslie Halliwell gave it one of four stars: "A big bestseller from another era; its flaws of conception and production quickly become evident." Pauline Kael lauded the film: "One of the most likable movies of all time. Under the direction of Clarence Brown, the 12-year-old Elizabeth Taylor rings true on every line she speaks ... The film is a high-spirited, childish dream; like The Wizard of Oz, it makes people smile when they recall it."

National Velvet holds a 98% 'Fresh' rating on Rotten Tomatoes based on 61 reviews, with an average rating of 8/10. The site's consensus reads: "National Velvet makes the most of a breakout performance from Elizabeth Taylor, delivering a timeless family-friendly tearjerker that avoids straying into the sentimental". On Metacritic, the film holds a weighted average score of 83 out of 100, based on 15 critics, indicating "universal acclaim".

At the box office, the film earned $3,678,000 in the US and Canada and $2,162,000 elsewhere.

=== Academy Awards ===
The film won two Oscars, and was nominated for three others, in 1945:

Awards
Award	Date of ceremony	Category	Recipients	Result
Academy Awards	March 7, 1946	Best Director	Clarence Brown	Nominated
Academy Awards	March 7, 1946	Best Actress in a Supporting Role	Anne Revere	Won
Academy Awards	March 7, 1946	Best Cinematography, Color	Leonard Smith	Nominated
Academy Awards	March 7, 1946	Best Art Direction – Interior Decoration, Color	Art Direction: Cedric Gibbons and Urie McCleary; Interior Decoration: Edwin B. Willis and Mildred Griffiths	Nominated
Academy Awards	March 7, 1946	Best Film Editing	Robert J. Kern	Won

== Other adaptations ==
- National Velvet was dramatized as a one-hour radio play on the February 3, 1947 broadcast of Lux Radio Theater, with Elizabeth Taylor, Mickey Rooney, Donald Crisp and Janice Scott.
- In 1960, the film was adapted into a television series with the same title.

== Sequel ==
In 1978, the sequel International Velvet was released. The film stars Tatum O'Neal, Christopher Plummer, Anthony Hopkins, and Nanette Newman, who plays Velvet Brown as an adult. After the events of National Velvet, Donald got married, had a daughter named Sarah Velvet Brown, and moved from England to Cave Creek, Arizona. Sarah comes to live with Velvet and her boyfriend John after Donald and his wife die from their injuries in a car accident. Elizabeth Taylor did not reprise her role as Velvet in the sequel.

== See also ==
- List of films about horses
- List of films about horse racing
