= National Velvet (TV series) =

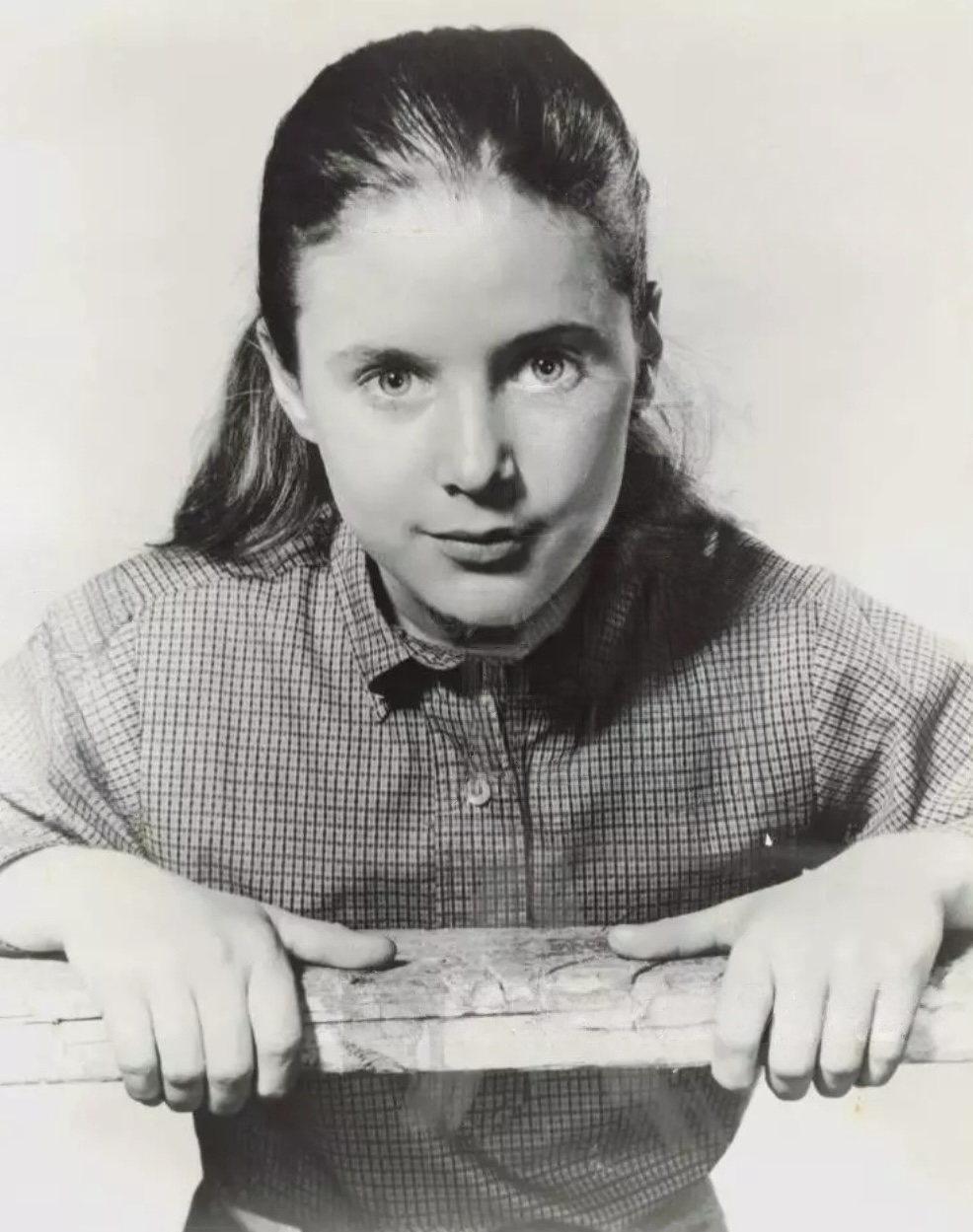
- Lori Martin as Velvet Brown (1961)
- Genre: Drama
- Starring: Lori Martin; Ann Doran; Arthur Space; Carole Wells; Joey Scott; James McCallion
- Theme music composer: Robert Armbruster
- Composers: Frank E. Anderson; Alexander Courage
- Country of origin: United States
- Original language: English
- No. of seasons: 2
- No. of episodes: 58

Production
- Executive producer: Robert Maxwell
- Producer: Rudolph E. Abel
- Cinematography: Lucien Andriot; Stuart Thompson
- Running time: 22–24 minutes
- Production company: MGM Television

Original release
- Network: NBC
- Release: September 18, 1960 – September 17, 1962

Related
- National Velvet (novel); National Velvet (film)

National Velvet is an American drama television series that originally aired from 1960 to 1962 on NBC. Based on the 1935 novel and 1944 film of the same name, the series ran for a total of fifty-eight episodes.

== Synopsis ==
National Velvet stars Lori Martin as Velvet Brown, a girl who lives on a dairy farm with her parents, Martha (Ann Doran) and Herbert Brown (Arthur Space), an ex-jockey Mi Taylor, played by Scottish actor James McCallion, her brother, Donald (Joey Scott), and sister, Edwina (Carole Wells). Velvet owned a thoroughbred stallion named King which she hoped would one day run in the Grand National.

== Cast ==
- Lori Martin as Velvet Brown
- Arthur Space as Herbert Brown
- Carole Wells as Edwina Brown
- Joey Scott as Donald Brown
- Ann Doran as Martha Brown
- James McCallion as Mi Taylor

=== Guest stars ===
- Parley Baer
- Roy Barcroft
- Beau Bridges
- Edgar Buchanan
- James T. Callahan
- James Chandler
- Robert L. Crawford, Jr.
- Audrey Dalton
- Richard Deacon
- Don Dubbins
- Jack Elam
- Ross Elliott
- Frank Ferguson
- Joan Freeman
- Darlene Gillespie
- Harold Gould
- Susan Seaforth Hayes
- Ricky Kelman
- Sheila James Kuehl
- Harry Lauter
- Betty Lynn
- Nora Marlowe
- Tyler McVey
- Roger Mobley
- Bill Mumy
- J. Pat O'Malley
- Emory Parnell
- Denver Pyle
- Stuart Randall
- Addison Richards
- Hal J. Smith
- Rusty Stevens

== Episodes ==
=== Season 1 (1960–61) ===
No. overall	No. in season	Title	Directed by	Written by	Original release date	Prod. code
1	1	"The Raffle"	Unknown	Unknown	September 18, 1960	6201
2	2	"The Breaking"	Harry Keller	Claire Kennedy	September 25, 1960	6202
3	3	"Chip"	Harry Keller	Claire Kennedy	October 2, 1960	6204
4	4	"A Matter of Pride"	Unknown	Unknown	October 9, 1960	
5	5	"Edwina's Escapade"	Harry Keller	S : John Elliotte & June Lee; T : John Elliotte	October 16, 1960	
6	6	"The Drought"	Unknown	Unknown	October 23, 1960	6203
7	7	"The Canary"	Anton M. Leader	S : James Henerson; T : Lawrence Menkin & James Henerson	October 30, 1960	6213
8	8	"Mi's Girl"	Rudolph E. Abel	S : Claire Kennedy & Thelma Robinson; T : Thelma Robinson	November 6, 1960	6212
9	9	"Anniversary"	Gerald Schnitzer	S : James Henerson; T : Jon Stone & Paul King	November 13, 1960	
10	10	"Crisis"	Unknown	Unknown	November 20, 1960	
11	11	"The Barbecue"	Gerald Schnitzer	David Duncan & James S. Henerson	November 27, 1960	
12	12	"The Milkman"	Unknown	Unknown	December 4, 1960	
13	13	"Donald's Friend"	Unknown	Unknown	December 11, 1960	6207
14	14	"The Big Shot"	Unknown	Unknown	December 18, 1960	
15	15	"The Quarrel"	Unknown	Unknown	December 25, 1960	
16	16	"The Prize"	Victor Stoloff	Anne Howard Bailey	January 1, 1961	
17	17	"The Star Wish"	Unknown	Unknown	January 8, 1961	
18	18	"Teddy's Exam"	Victor Stoloff	S : Miriam Geiger & Claire Kennedy; T : Kit Lukas	January 15, 1961	
19	19	"The Colt"	Victor Stoloff	Claire Kennedy	January 22, 1961	
20	20	"The Calf"	Victor Stoloff	Lawrence Watkin	January 29, 1961	6222
21	21	"The Grudge Match"	Victor Stoloff	James S. Henerson	February 5, 1961	
22	22	"The Fire"	Abner Biberman	Claire Kennedy	February 12, 1961	6226
23	23	"The Sissy"	Abner Biberman	Anne Howard Bailey	February 19, 1961	
24	24	"Grandpa"	Abner Biberman	John Furia, Jr. & Claire Kennedy	February 26, 1961	
25	25	"Epidemic"	Frank McDonald	S : James S. Henerson; T : Kit Lukas	March 5, 1961	
26	26	"The Beauty Contest"	Frank McDonald	Gail Ingram Clement	March 12, 1961	6226
27	27	"The Swindle"	Frank McDonald	S : Anne Howard Bailey & Claire Kennedy; T : Anne Howard Bailey	March 19, 1961	6232
28	28	"The Circuit"	Frank McDonald	Terence Maples	March 26, 1961	6230
29	29	"The Riding Mistress"	Abner Biberman	Frank Gabrielson	April 9, 1961	6233
30	30	"Grandpa Returns"	Abner Biberman	Claire Kennedy	April 16, 1961	6234
31	31	"The Bridegroom"	Unknown	Unknown	April 23, 1961	6236
32	32	"The Efficiency Expert"	Abner Biberman	James S. Henerson	April 30, 1961	6235

=== Season 2 (1961–62) ===
No. overall	No. in season	Title	Directed by	Written by	Original release date	Prod. code
33	1	"The Pony"	Frank McDonald	Claire Kennedy	September 18, 1961	6240
34	2	"The Lake"	Unknown	Unknown	September 25, 1961	6241
35	3	"The Bully"	Unknown	Unknown	October 2, 1961	6243
36	4	"The Fall"	Frank McDonald	Anne Howard Bailey	October 9, 1961	6249
37	5	"Edwina's Elopement"	Unknown	Unknown	October 16, 1961	6250
38	6	"The Tramp"	Frank McDonald	Arnold Belgard	October 23, 1961	6244
39	7	"Fortune Teller"	Frank McDonald	Margaret Armen	October 30, 1961	6248
40	8	"Donald's Tonsils"	Frank McDonald	Cally Curtis & Dick Stenger	November 6, 1961	6254
41	9	"The Outsider"	Frank McDonald	Richard Newman	November 13, 1961	6253
42	10	"The Club"	Unknown	Unknown	November 20, 1961	6258
43	11	"The Desperado"	Frank McDonald	Lawrence Watkin	November 27, 1961	6245
44	12	"The Experiment"	Frank McDonald	Ben Perry	December 11, 1961	6251
45	13	"Terry"	Frank McDonald	Barbara Phipps	December 18, 1961	6256
46	14	"The Haunted House"	Frank McDonald	Marie Baumer	December 25, 1961	6247
47	15	"Stable Mates"	Unknown	Unknown	January 8, 1962	
48	16	"Martha's Beau"	Unknown	Unknown	January 22, 1962	
49	17	"The Scandal"	Frank McDonald	Peggy Phillips	January 29, 1962	
50	18	"The Star"	Unknown	Unknown	February 5, 1962	
51	19	"The Test"	Unknown	Unknown	February 12, 1962	
52	20	"The Feud"	Frank McDonald	Frank Gabrielson	February 19, 1962	
53	21	"Jeopardy"	Frank McDonald	Anne Howard Bailey	February 26, 1962	
54	22	"The Rogue Horse"	Unknown	Unknown	March 5, 1962	
55	23	"Mi's Citizenship"	Frank McDonald	Elroy Schwartz & Glenn Wheaton	March 12, 1962	6252
56	24	"The Rumor"	Frank McDonald	Pat Falken Smith	March 19, 1962	6266
57	25	"Ede's Bombshell"	Unknown	Unknown	March 26, 1962	6257
58	26	"The Clown"	Unknown	Unknown	April 2, 1962	
