= Epic Horse =

Historical fiction book series

- Rider in the Dark; Horse from the Sea; Heart of Fire
- Author: Victoria Holmes
- Country: United Kingdom/United States
- Language: English
- Genre: Children's literature Historical fiction
- Publisher: HarperCollins

Epic Horse is a historical fiction series by author Victoria Holmes. There are three books in the series each following a new heroine and setting. The idea was first thought of when Holmes worked for Working Partners and came up of a historical fiction story. Each book has separate inspirations and influences on the time period and characters.

== Inspiration and origins ==
The series began as Holmes thought of an idea for a novel in the historical fiction genre for her company HarperCollins which was rising in popularity. At the time Holmes "had just been on vacation in the English county of Dorset where my imagination had latched on to tales of smugglers and wreckers and beautiful hills overlooking long stretches of stony beach". Although she never intended to actually author the entire series, the company requested for her to write and publish a four-book series. The idea for the first book Rider in the Dark easily came to Holmes along with the second book Horse from the Sea. She says that "I clearly remember standing in the middle of the Connemara mountains and saying, “One day I will write a story set here”".

Holmes received separate inspirations for each novel as each one follows and tells a separate story. Holmes says that "I am inspired primarily by a sense of place – Dorset for Rider, Galway and Connemara for Horse, the country estate in Berkshire where I grew up for Heart, and now gorgeous Dartmoor in the county of Devon". Horse From the Sea is based in 16th century Ireland since Holmes felt it was a beautiful and interesting time period of the country. The horse's names in the series all came from different sources of inspiration. Oriel from the first book is a type of window, Lir from the second book is the Irish god of the sea, Firebird was one of the horses Holmes used to ride and in the fourth book the names are similar to Bracken and Myrtle, types of plants.

== Setting and structure ==
Each book in the series is a stand-alone book following a new protagonist and setting. The first book takes place in 18th-century Britain following Holly. The second book takes place in Ireland following Nora. Then in the third book Heart of Fire the setting change to the aftermath of World War II following Maddie. Holmes says that this is due to the fact that "the publisher specifically asked for “stand alone” stories, which means that each book is self-contained and the characters don't appear in other books". Holmes like the idea since with each new book she was able to explore more characters and settings. However, after writing each book, she realized how attached she had grown to each character, such as Nell from the first book "Nora’s shyness and feelings of clumsiness at crowded parties".

== Genre and themes ==
HarperCollins requested the series to be part of the historical fiction genre taking due to the rise in popularity at the time of publication. School Library Journal noted the similarity of the plot to books such as Black Beauty and National Velvet writing that "This novel is reminiscent of Black Beauty and National Velvet, but adds a parallel story line about 18th-century England's politics, class structure, and judicial system". The first book also had a mix of mystery in it which was praised by VOYA finding that the mystery and historical fiction genre works complements each other. The second book The Horse From the Sea was also called a "romantic historical novel".

=== Social structure ===
In the first book Rider in the Dark, the two main characters Jamie and Nell are very close friends. In an interview it was asked whether or not they were in love and Holmes responded that they are too young to actually to be in love, but were even if they were, they never could be married due to the 18th century social structure. In the book Nell is the daughter of the lord while Jamie is a mere stable-boy. Due to the rigid structure at the time, it would have been impossible for Nell to marry a servant like Jamie. Holmes says that even though even today "social structure is less rigid but there are other things that get in the way of relationships, like culture or the color of your skin".

=== Witchcraft ===
In the fourth book Holmes said that she wanted explore the theme of witchcraft. Holly, the book's "heroine’s grandmother Willow is a “wise woman”, who knows about the healing properties of plants and herbs and is consulted by the local people when they get sick." However, at the same time that type of knowledge is also considered to be black magic. Holmes wanted to see how this knowledge would affect Holly. At the same time it isn't important if Willow is indeed a witch, but whether or not Holly will continue on healing with this knowledge. This also ties with a theme of faith. Holmes wonders that "if Holly believes she is capable of black magic, does that mean bad things will happen?"

== Publication history ==
The first book, Rider in the Dark was published as a hardcover in the US on September 7, 2004. The paperback was published about two years later on January 24, 2006, along with a new cover. The second book, The Horse From the Sea was published about half a year after Rider in the Dark on April 26, 2005. The paperback version had a cover change and published on August 8, 2006. The last book, Heart of Fire has only been released as a hardcover after publication on October 10, 2006.

== Critical reception ==
Review towards the series has been positive. The first book was praised by Booklist for the adventure and moral dilemmas. The reviewer recommend the book to horse and history lovers. However, the review felt the twist ending in the book "may feel shortchanged". School Library Journal noted similarities to Black Beauty and National Velvet. The review found "a parallel story line about 18th-century England's politics, class structure, and judicial system" thought commented the themes do not make up the entire story, "but instead shines as a fast-paced tale appealing to readers with diverse interests". Kirkus Reviews found that the subtitle "An Epic Horse Story" "is barely warning enough for the overstrained breathless incredulity that follows". Overall, the reviewer found the book very enjoyable to many readers. Horn Book Review came a very negative review writing "Horses and mysteries should be a solid combination, but Helena's overblown sense of urgency will more likely irritate readers than capture their attention". Kliatt reviewer Claire Rosser found the book to suit readers who wanted another Black Stallion. She also recommend it to horse lovers and felt Helen's "worries about right and wrong add some depth". Children's Literature found that "combination of horse story, historical novel, and mystery works very well" and that although Helen is of the upper-class, her interactions "does not stray too far into the realm of historical inaccuracy". Voice of Youth Advocates (VOYA) found the victory predictable, but Helena's tomboyish portrayal realistic and that "details of daily life in the England of 1740 are realistically, if somewhat optimistically depicted".

The second book received mixed reviews. Booklist gave a very positive review feeling that Holmes added in a lot of historical detail while keeping it away from sounding like a textbook. In the end, the reviewer writes "Holmes blends strong plot, suspense, and appealing characters into a rousing high-adventure horse story". Meanwhile, School Library Journal felt that the book would only appeal to readers who wanted to know everything about horses while others "may feel bogged down". At the same time, the main character was noted to be weak and badly developed. The reviewer also criticized how "The freedom Nora enjoys does not seem believable and the plot is predictable. Jane Yolen's The Queen's Own Fool (Philomel, 2000), set during the same time period, has stronger characters". Once again, the Children's Literature reviewer found the book to be beautifully written for young adults. The historical accuracy was praised with the reviewer writing "as with any well-researched period novel, it is a great history lesson, too".

Reviews for the third book Heart of Fire was also mixed. School Library Journal found the ending too predictable and that even with the training schedules, animal book readers would still be disappointed. The characters were criticized as being not memorable and the story's pace would "not have readers stampeding to the shelves". The reviewer did add in that "the story line has some enjoyable twists and turns" but found it hard to believe only Maddie recognized Theo as a fake. Booklist gave a very positive review writing "With several other surprises to keep the plot moving forward, this is a satisfying historical adventure with special appeal for readers who relish horse stories". Children's Literature reviewer Heidi Hauser Green found the book to be "an engaging tale of love, loss, and family" while the plot has many twists and the heroine "grows in character and spirit through the course of this intriguing novel".
