= Mildred Griffiths =

American set decorator (1894–1949)

- Born: January 20, 1894; California
- Died: May 24, 1949 (aged 55); Los Angeles, California
- Occupation: Set decorator
- Years active: 1943-1948

Mildred Griffiths (January 20, 1894 – May 24, 1949) was an American set decorator. She was nominated for an Academy Award in the category Best Art Direction for the film National Velvet.

== Selected filmography ==
- National Velvet (1944)
