= Pullman Court =

Building in the London Borough of Lambeth, England

Coordinates: 51.4430°N 0.1235°W

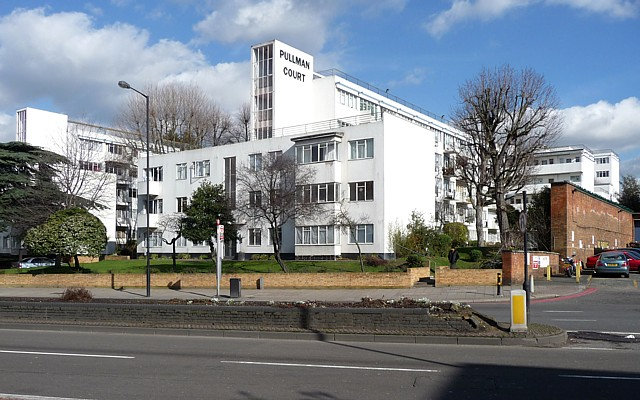
Pullman Court

Pullman Court is a Grade II* listed building on Streatham Hill, London, designed by Frederick Gibberd.

It was built in 1936, and commissioned from Gibberd when he was 23.

Pullman Court consists of 218 flats in three blocks.

Actress Nanette Newman lived in the block in the 1940s.
