= Tower blocks in Great Britain =

High-rise buildings for residential use

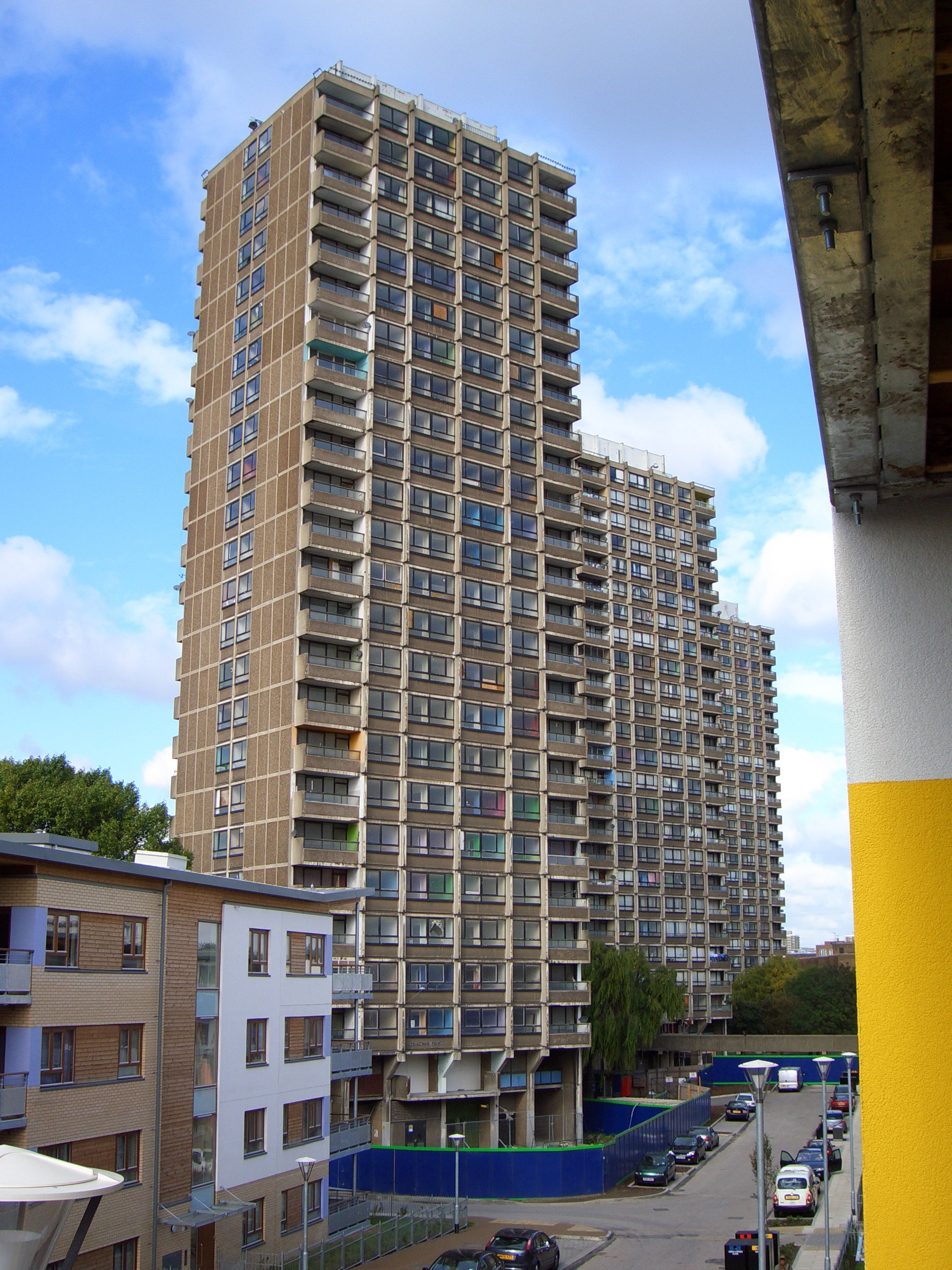
The three tower blocks of the Crossways Estate in Bow, London, United Kingdom, before their refurbishment

Tower blocks began to be built in Great Britain after the Second World War. The first residential tower block, "The Lawn", was constructed in Harlow, Essex, in 1951; it is now a Grade II listed building. In many cases, tower blocks were seen as a "quick fix" to cure problems caused by the existence of crumbling and unsanitary 19th-century dwellings or to replace buildings destroyed by German aerial bombing. It was argued that towers surrounded by public open space could provide for the same population density as the terraced housing and small private gardens they replaced, offering larger rooms and improved views, whilst being cheaper to build.

Initially, tower blocks were welcomed, and their excellent views made them popular living places. Later, as the buildings themselves deteriorated, they grew a reputation for being undesirable low-cost housing, and many tower blocks had rising crime levels, increasing their unpopularity. One response to this was the great increase in the number of housing estates built, which, in turn, brings its own problems. In the UK, tower blocks particularly lost popularity after the partial collapse of Ronan Point in east London in 1968. They are still present in many British cities.

== Design ==
Postwar Britain was the stage for a tower block "building boom"; from the 1950s to the late 1970s, as a dramatic increase took place in tower-block construction. During this time, local authorities desired to impress their voters by building futuristic and imposing tower blocks, which would signify postwar progress. Both Patrick Dunleavy and Lynsey Hanley agree that architects and planners were influenced by Le Corbusier's promotion of high-rise architecture. The modern tower blocks were to include features that would foster desired forms of resident interaction, an example being the inclusion of Le Corbusier’s streets in the sky in some estates.

As well as inspiring residents, local authority planners believed that the way tower blocks were constructed would save money. Generally, the tower blocks were built on cheap greenfield land skirting established cities. Although the property prices for these periphery sites were markedly cheaper than their inner-city counterparts, they often had little access to public amenities, such as public transport. The implementation of industrialised building techniques was thought to lower costs, too, as similar tower blocks could be replicated over many sites. Uniform and standardised parts, such as toilet fittings and door handles, would be fitted throughout many tower blocks; planners deemed that buying in bulk would reduce overall costs.

Another key aspect of the tower block vision was the Brutalist architectural method, popular with architects and planners at the time. The Brutalist emphasis led to the construction of stark and striking tower blocks with large sections of exposed concrete. Concrete was to be an integral part of the tower-block designs; it could be poured on site, offering boundless flexibility to the building designers. To the planners, concrete was a silver bullet for the construction process – it was economical, and "was vaunted as being long-lasting, if not indestructible".

== Social issues ==
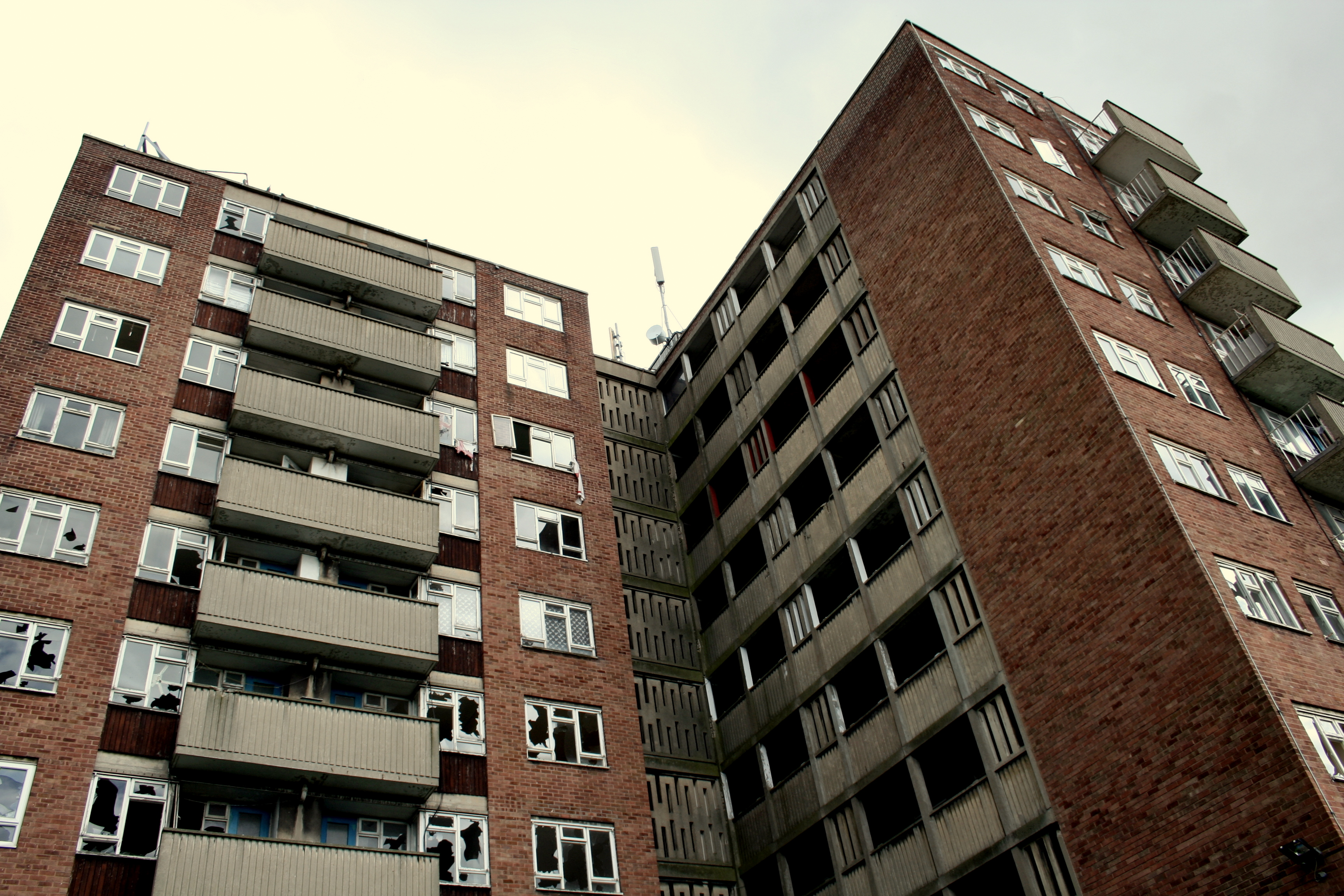
Elmet Towers in Swarcliffe, Leeds, showing the dereliction that led to its demolition

Coleman's 1985 work argues that in trying to emulate Le Corbusier's ideas, the tower-block planners only succeeded in encouraging social problems. Although architects and local authorities intended the opposite, tower blocks quickly became, as Hanley sharply stated, "slums in the sky". Due to demanding deadlines, pre-fabricated construction methods were used - most commonly Large Panel System (LPS) building. However, many of these construction methods were fundamentally flawed in their unsuitability for the typical inclement weather experienced in the British Isles, compounded by rushed and improper assembly of the buildings. As a result, many tower blocks experienced structural decay – roofs leaked, concrete suffered spalling, steel corroded, and damp penetrated the buildings. Unfortunately, by replicating 'off-the-peg" tower block designs across the nation, planners "disastrously" replicated design faults. In many tower blocks, concrete quickly exhibited signs of decay; cracks soon formed and destabilised the buildings. The partial collapse of the Ronan Point tower block is an infamous example of the hasty and substandard construction that occurred in a number of the towers. The tower blocks quickly lost their "futuristic" look; concrete turned from the crisp white the designers had imagined to a dull grey, stained by pollution.

Tower blocks were unsuitable for families with children, as parents could not supervise them playing outside from a flat in the sky. Poor design decisions ruined the anticipated benefits of the buildings. Open spaces, which were supposed to benefit the residents, were instead unattractive, unused, and inadequately supervised; often, the spaces were simply left as undeveloped wasteland. Residents felt maintaining the large open spaces around the blocks was difficult because they realistically belonged to no one. Social problems increased as the tower blocks quickly degraded because of poor maintenance and an insecure communal environment, leading to an increase in crime in the common areas. Apart from frequent break-downs, communal lifts were a source of fear for people travelling alone. Rarely could one "enter a clean-smelling, undefaced lift". The tower blocks, many of which were on the periphery of the city, made residents feel isolated and cut off from society. Outsiders and newcomers were also affected; they felt the overbearing design of the tower blocks made them fearsome and unsociable.

Power argues that as a direct consequence of their design and construction, security problems were prevalent in many of the tower blocks. Break-ins, vandalism, and muggings were common, which were aided by the buildings' concealed areas, the mazes of internal corridors, and dark corners. Police were often required in the tower blocks, but their frequent presence did little to pacify towers rife with delinquency. To contain disruptive behaviour, local authorities began to place "problem families" in the same blocks; Hanley argues that this policy only led to "further alienation ... nihilism and a creeping sense of lawlessness". Dunleavy seconds this, suggesting that the mental health of long-term tower-block residents may have been detrimentally affected.

While local authorities and their architects intended to create tower blocks that encouraged harmonious and vibrant communities, often the results were far from ideal. Postwar tower blocks were compromised from the outset by a combination of faults; local authorities advocated impractical architectural methods; design and construction faults were frequently reproduced; and a lack of understanding appeared about the social consequences of certain design features. Collectively, these oversights transformed many tower blocks into undesirable places to live. By 1985, 45% of people living in tower blocks were in the 10 poorest local authorities in the country.

== Fire safety ==
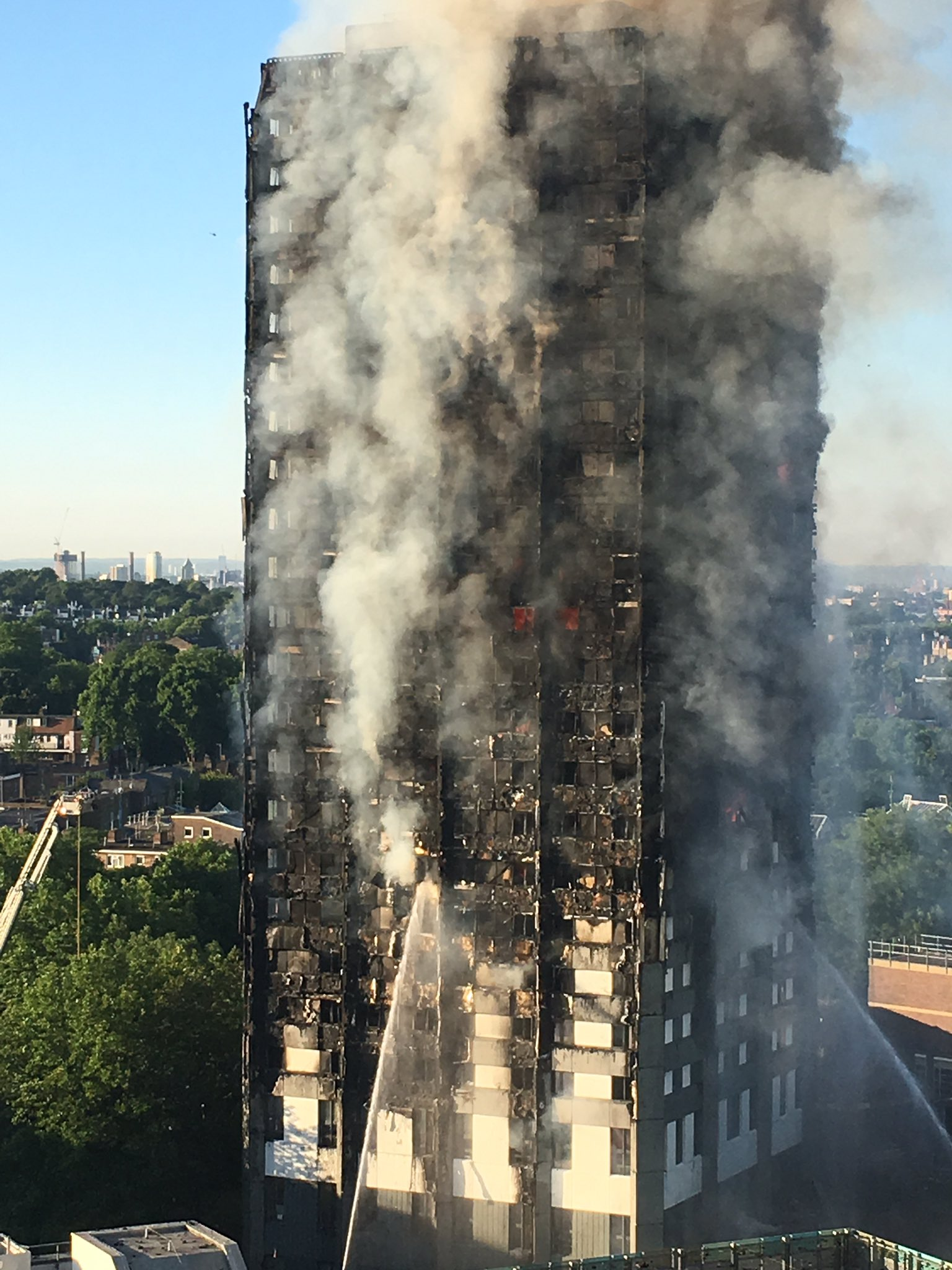
Grenfell Tower in Kensington, London, had inadequate fire protection and safety procedures, which proved fatal when the block was consumed by fire in June 2017.

Compliant protections for residents in tower blocks can be very expensive to retrofit, and lessors (such as local authorities) have been sued for lack of a current fire-safety inspection, or implementation of its recommendations. Member of Parliament for Kingston and Surbiton, Ed Davey, commented regarding a life-claiming 2009 fire that many blocks in the UK remained inadequate. North Ayrshire Council has decided to remove plastic cladding from its buildings following a fatal fire in a tower block. Poor maintenance of electrical equipment, fire doors, and other features has caused widespread fire hazards, and residents are asked to pay part of the cost of putting this right, though the problem is due to poor maintenance and errors in design.

Tower blocks may be inherently more prone to casualties from a fire because people living on higher floors cannot escape fires easily and the fire brigade cannot reach the higher floors quickly. In buildings with more than 100 residents, ensuring that every single resident acts responsibly to minimize fire risk is difficult; poorer residents in tower blocks may be tempted to use cheaper flammable fuels rather than electricity, they are also more likely to be smokers (carelessness with cigarettes is a major cause of home fires), and they are more likely to have old furniture, not made to modern fire-safety standards. Fire-safety legislation introduced in 2006 requires new high-rise buildings to be built to higher safety standards with sprinkler systems; the same standards do not apply to pre-2006 tower blocks, which contain a greater proportion of poor people. Recent studies have investigated the combined use of egress components (e.g., stairs and elevators) to enhance the effectiveness of evacuation strategies in case of fire.

The 24-storey Grenfell Tower in Kensington, London, was destroyed by fire in June 2017. The rapid spread of the fire was believed to have been caused by recent remedial work, which added flammable exterior cladding. The safety instructions advised residents to stay indoors in the event of the fire, which proved fatal as they assumed a fire could not spread via the block's exterior. A local residents' organisation, Grenfell Action Group, warned that fire safety was inadequate and had expressed concerns about a fatal incident before the fire occurred. The Grenfell Tower fire was one of many similar fires worldwide where unsatisfactory cladding was a factor. Cladding can worsen a fire and enable a fire to spread fast if it is not done to satisfactory standards. The cladding can act as a chimney, enabling the fire to spread upwards rapidly. Temperatures in a fire can be high enough to cause plastic cladding to melt, then molten plastic drips downwards, burning as it falls, and spreads the fire rapidly downwards. These fires happen in the cavity, so seeing how serious the fire is, from the inside or outside, is frequently impossible. Smoke detectors sometimes do not detect the fires. The Lakanal House fire, where six people died, was exacerbated by fibre composite cladding called Trespa, which resisted the fire less well than asbestos panels that the Trespa replaced. An unnamed surveyor told The Guardian, "We do a lot of investigations of defective buildings, and we regularly see deficiencies in the workmanship. Gaps are left where there shouldn’t be gaps, or a form of less fire-resistant insulation is used instead of a proper fire break. These things are done to cut costs and save time, but we must get tougher on inspection and ensure the people fitting these facades are properly trained. Otherwise, there are thousands more people who could be at risk."

Many fire risk assessments (FRA) are considered inadequate because the assessors fail to examine the structure in detail, for example, looking above false ceilings. Grenfell Tower in London was considered a medium-fire risk, but in spite of this, at least 72 people died in the fire; FRA also failed with the Lakanal House fire. Prof Arnold Dix described the FRA system as only a, "box-ticking exercise". Dix maintains cladding, how hard it is to evacuate a burning tower block, fire risks inside flats such as old electrical equipment that is at greater risk of catching fire and combustible bedding, are not taken into account.

== Current use ==
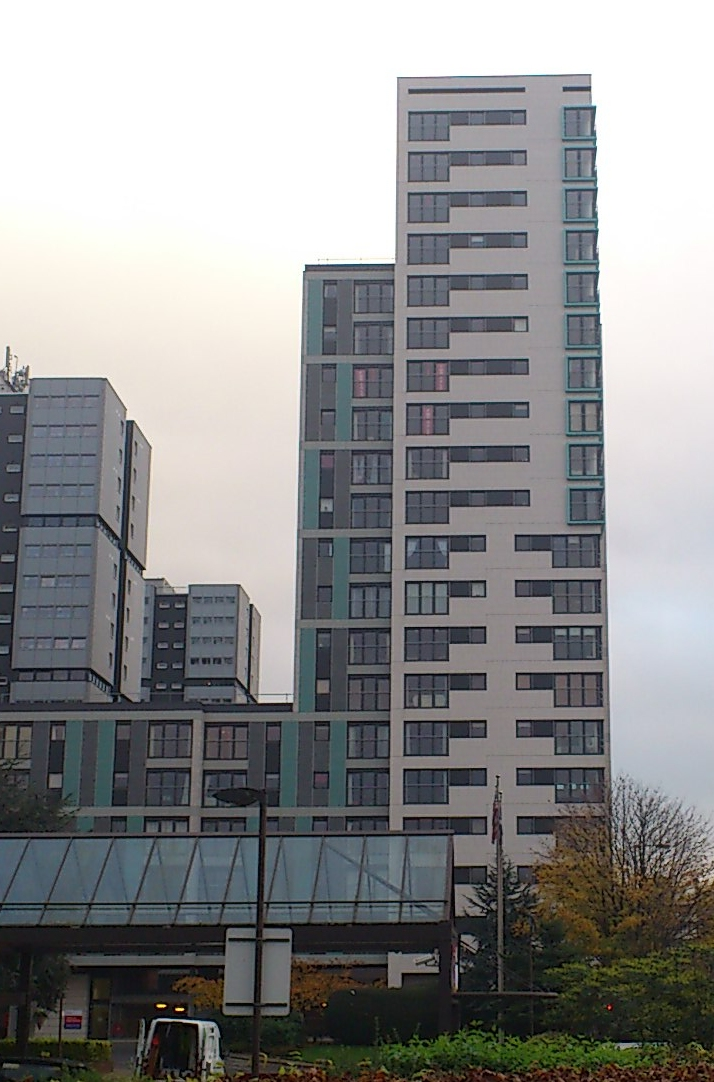
The Argyle Building, Glasgow, finished in 2008, is an example of modern UK tower blocks

In recent years, some council or ex-council high-rises in the United Kingdom, including Trellick Tower, Keeling House, and Sivill House, have become popular with young professionals due to their excellent views, desirable locations, and architectural pedigrees, and now command high prices. Plans have been made to redevelop the Little London and Lovell Park areas on the fringes of Leeds city centre into luxury flats for 'young urban professionals'. The plans entail demolishing all of the council housing and refurbishing the high-rise flats. This demand has led to many councils rethinking plans regarding their demolition.

In Glasgow, similar initiatives have taken place; in 2011, the Glasgow Housing Association saved one of a cluster of three condemned tower blocks in the Ibrox area with the help of government grants to transform it into desirable rented housing for young professionals. Glasgow itself has taken a more measured approach to its high-rise housing stock, eschewing the mass demolition programmes being practiced in other British cities – favouring selective refurbishment of estates with secure futures and on buildings in good structural condition, only razing towers where absolutely necessary.

After a gap of around 30 years, new high-rise flats are once again being built in Belfast, Birmingham (some are for wealthy people, e.g. The Mailbox, others are student accommodation), Cardiff, Aberdeen, Glasgow, Leeds, Liverpool, London, Manchester, Bristol, Newcastle upon Tyne, and Coventry (which at one point was building towers at a rate of one every month). but this time sometimes for wealthy professionals, rather than the "lower classes." Their developers market these properties using the American term "apartment buildings", perhaps in an effort to distance these newer buildings from the older tower blocks from the 1950s and 1960s. These are usually taller than their older counterparts and generally built in and around these provincial city centres. They are often glass- and aluminium-clad. Tonight with Trevor McDonald highlighted that in Leeds and Manchester (perhaps the cities that had seen most development) only approximately half were occupied and with owner occupation often being as low as 10%. In Southend, controversial plans exist to build new tower blocks for social housing; a supporter claims this will be cheaper than paying to house poor people with private landlords, while opponents fear the creation of ghettos. As of 2017, around 8% of Londoners live in a tower block, though there is still a mix of desirable property against lower-class social housing. A penthouse suite at 3 Merchant Square, Paddington, sold for £7.5m.

== See also ==
- Tower blocks in Glasgow
- Danchi, similar group housing buildings in Japan, constructed during the latter half of the 20th century
- Khrushchyovka, a class of group housing building common in countries formerly part of the USSR, constructed during the 1960’s
