= Nora Marlowe =

American actress (1915–1977)

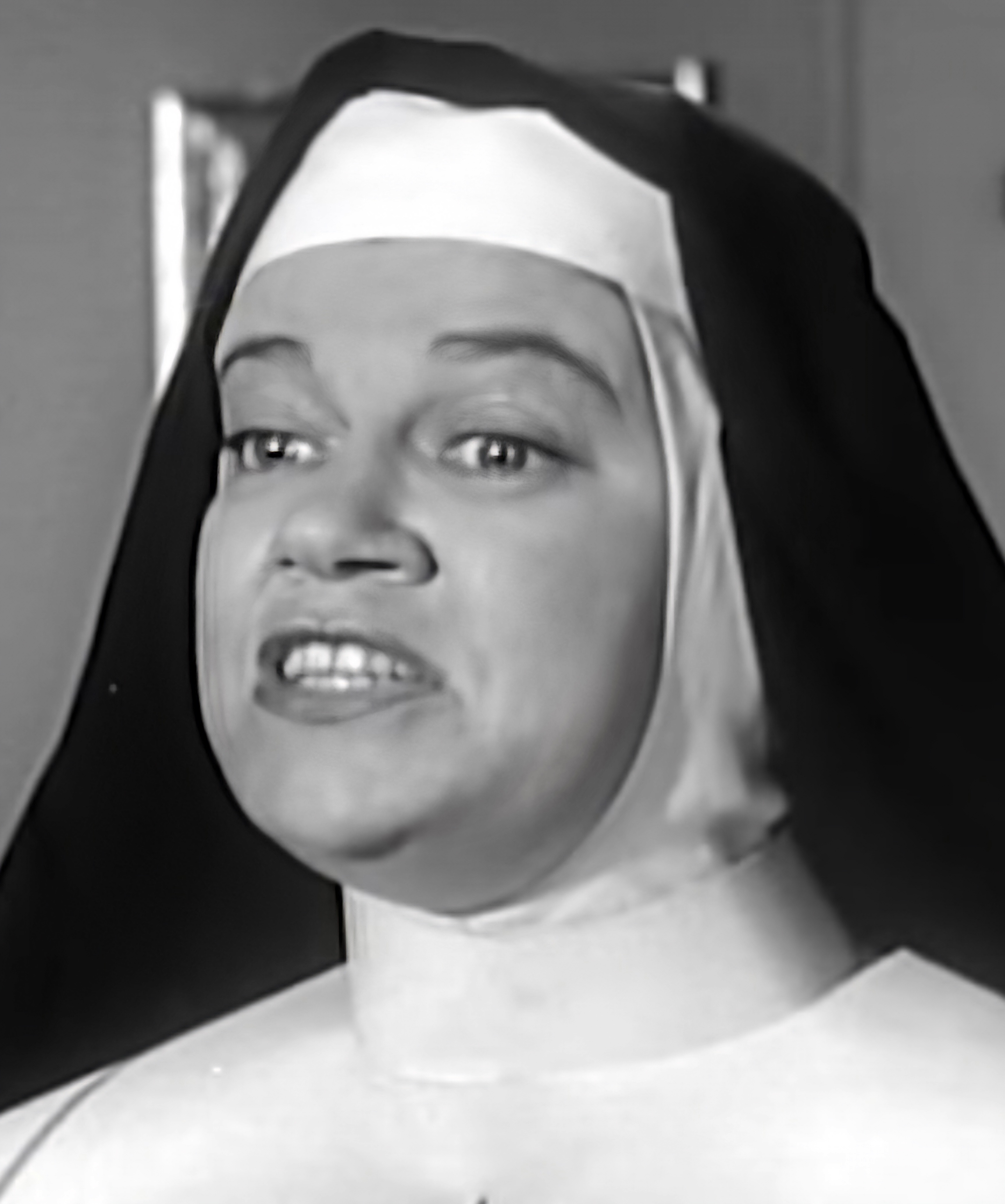
- Marlowe in an episode of The Public Defender (1955)
- Born: September 5, 1915; Worcester, Massachusetts, U.S.
- Died: December 31, 1977 (aged 62); Los Angeles, California, U.S.
- Occupation: Actress
- Years active: 1953–1977
- Spouse: James McCallion (m. 1943)
- Children: 2

Nora Marlowe (September 5, 1915 – December 31, 1977) was an American film and television character actress.

Born in Worcester, Massachusetts, Marlowe was an actress best known for her role from 1973 to 1977 as boardinghouse owner/operator Flossie Brimmer in 27 episodes of the drama The Waltons.

Marlowe also played Sara Andrews in 23 episodes of the sitcom The Governor and J.J., starring Dan Dailey, and she was cast in films such as The Thomas Crown Affair, North by Northwest, and Westworld.

== Career ==
Marlowe's professional career began in Boston, where she worked in radio.

Marlowe was cast in the 1959–1960 television season as Martha Commager, the owner of a boarding house, in seven episodes of Law of the Plainsman. She appeared three times as Mrs. Moffatt on the sitcom My Living Doll, starring Robert Cummings and Julie Newmar.

She appeared twice on the series State Trooper as Julia Brundidge in "Meeting at Julias" (1956) and as Sarah Brinkman in "The Clever Man" (1958). She then appeared in 1960 in Cameron's other crime drama series Coronado 9 as Nora Morgan in the episode "Run Scared."

Marlowe appeared seven times on Wagon Train, six times on Gunsmoke (one episode of which, “Robin Hood”, she co-starred with her husband, actor James McCallion), and twice on Dick Powell's Zane Grey Theatre. Her other guest-starring roles included Schlitz Playhouse, 77 Sunset Strip, Hawaiian Eye, The Millionaire, Shotgun Slade, Hotel de Paree, General Electric Theater, 87th Precinct, Frontier Circus, The Alfred Hitchcock Hour, The Donna Reed Show, Petticoat Junction, Going My Way, 12 O'Clock High, Family Affair, Bewitched, The Green Hornet, Lassie, Bridget Loves Bernie, Here Come the Brides, Barnaby Jones, Medical Center, Cade's County, Cannon, The Rockford Files, The Big Valley, The Guns of Will Sonnett, The F.B.I., Marcus Welby, M.D., The Outer Limits, The Bob Newhart Show, The Streets of San Francisco, and most notably her two appearances on The Twilight Zone: the 1961 episode "Back There" and the 1964 episode "Night Call".

On The Waltons, she played Mrs. Flossie Brimmer, a widow who ran the boardinghouse. Like Will Geer, who played grandfather Zebulon Walton, Marlowe died between the end of the 6th season and the start of filming for the 7th season. Also, as with Geer, the role was not recast, and the first episode of the 7th season made reference to the character’s death. As it is mentioned that it has been 6 months since Zebulon Walton died, it’s revealed that Flossie died somewhere in that timespan, in 1941. Viewers were made aware of her death by a scene in Ike Godsey's store. Olivia Walton receives a package from Patsy Brimmer, Flossie's niece. The package contains Flossie's cameo ring, and a note from Patsy stating that she felt Flossie would have wanted Olivia to have it, and a request to think of Flossie when it was worn. The Baldwin sisters, Miss Emily and Miss Mamie, Corabeth Godsey, Ike Godsey, and Olivia then reminisce about Flossie, and Miss Emily comments that the boardinghouse is now boarded up. Later in the episode, it is revealed that one of the boarders, Zulika Dunbar, known for flirting in past episodes with Zebulon Walton, purchased it, with plans to reopen it.

== Personal life and death ==
In addition to National Velvet, she and James McCallion appeared together in Wagon Train and The Big Valley. They had two children, Denis McCallion and Tracey McCallion Campbell. Their son Denis later became a television producer, and their daughter Tracey worked as a personal assistant to many people in the entertainment industry.

Marlowe died in Los Angeles, California, on December 31, 1977.

== Filmography ==
- Alfred Hitchcock Presents (1957) (Season 2 Episode 27: "I Killed the Count Part 3") – Policewoman
- I'll Cry Tomorrow (1957) – Nurse (uncredited)
- The Shadow on the Window (1957) – Mrs. Bergen (uncredited)
- This Could Be the Night (1957) – Mrs. Gretchma (uncredited)
- Designing Woman (1957) – Jennifer Deane (uncredited)
- An Affair to Remember (1957) – Gladys – Terry's Maid (uncredited)
- Handle with Care (1958) – Mrs. Franklin (uncredited)
- The Rabbit Trap (1959) – Bus Passenger (uncredited)
- North by Northwest (1959) – Anna – Housekeeper (uncredited)
- The Alfred Hitchcock Hour (1962) (Season 1 Episode 6: "Final Vow") – Landlady
- Wagon Train (1963) – Ma Sikes – S6 E27 "The Adam MacKenzie Story"
- The Brass Bottle (1964) – Mrs. McGruder
- Kitten with a Whip (1964) – Matron
- Strange Bedfellows (1965) – Mrs. Carmody, Toni's Maid (uncredited)
- That Funny Feeling (1965) – Woman at Phone Booth
- Texas Across the River (1966) – Emma
- Eight on the Lam (1967) – Arthur's Wife (uncredited)
- The Hostage (1967) – Selma Morton
- Where Were You When the Lights Went Out? (1968) – Autograph Seeker (uncredited)
- The Thomas Crown Affair (1968) – Marcie
- Bewitched (1969) – Mrs. Harper
- Gaily, Gaily (1969) – (uncredited)
- Thirty Dangerous Seconds (1972)
- Soylent Green (1973) – Soylent Crumbs Seller (uncredited)
- Westworld (1973) – Hostess
- Mr. Ricco (1975) – Mrs. Callahan
