= International Velvet (film) =

1978 film by Bryan Forbes

- the picture's Theatrical poster
- Directed by: Bryan Forbes
- Written by: Bryan Forbes
- Based on: National Velvet; 1935 novel by Enid Bagnold
- Produced by: Bryan Forbes
- Starring: Tatum O'Neal; Nanette Newman; Anthony Hopkins; Christopher Plummer; Jeffrey Byron; Sarah Bullen; Richard Warwick
- Cinematography: Tony Imi
- Edited by: Timothy Gee
- Music by: Francis Lai
- Production company: Metro-Goldwyn-Mayer
- Distributed by: United Artists (United States/Canada); Cinema International Corporation (International)
- Release dates: July 19, 1978 (Los Angeles & New York City)
- Running time: 127 minutes
- Country: United States
- Language: English
- Box office: $7,009,238

International Velvet is a 1978 American film and a sequel to the 1944 picture National Velvet starring Tatum O'Neal, Christopher Plummer, Anthony Hopkins and Nanette Newman, and directed by Bryan Forbes. The film received mixed reviews. International Velvet was partly filmed at Birmingham University, England.

== Plot ==
Following the events of National Velvet, Velvet Brown's younger brother, Donald, has since married and moved to Arizona. After Donald and his wife are killed in a car crash, their 14-year-old daughter, Sarah, goes to England to live with her aunt, Velvet, and Velvet's partner, John.

When Velvet was about Sarah's age, she and her horse, Pie, raced in the legendary Grand National horse race and finished first; however, Velvet and Pie were immediately disqualified because teen-aged Velvet was an underage girl and an unlicensed jockey. The Pie was retired to stud, and his last foal is born shortly after Sarah's arrival in England. Sarah wants the colt, so Velvet buys him for her. Sarah aptly names him Arizona Pie.

Sarah shows enough riding talent to be selected for the British Olympic equestrian team. She is a junior member but progresses well under the stern guidance of Captain Johnson. Sarah achieves her dream and enters the Olympic Three Day Event helping Great Britain win the team competition. She falls in love with American competitor, Scott Saunders. They marry and move back to America. At the film's conclusion, they return to England to visit Velvet and John. Sarah gives Velvet her Olympic medal.

== Cast ==
- Tatum O'Neal as Sarah Velvet Brown
- Christopher Plummer as John Seaton
- Anthony Hopkins as Captain Johnson
- Nanette Newman as Velvet Brown
- Peter Barkworth as Pilot
- Dinsdale Landen as Mr. Curtis
- Sarah Bullen as Beth
- Jeffrey Byron as Scott Saunders
- Richard Warwick as Tim
- Daniel Abineri as Wilson
- Jason White as Roger
- Martin Neil as Mike
- Douglas Reith as Howard
- Dennis Blanch as Policeman
- Norman Wooland as Team Doctor
- Susan Jameson as T.V. Interviewer
- Brenda Cowling as Alice
- David Tate as Commentator
- James Smillie as Commentator

== Production ==
It was the first film shot in England financed by MGM since 1971. The head of MGM at the time was Richard Shepherd, who was former agent for Bryan Forbes.

The majority of the countryside riding and home scenes were filmed in and around the Flete Estate in South Devon, including Mothecombe Beach and the nearby village of Holbeton.

The Cross-Country riding sequences were filmed in the grounds of Burghley House near Stamford, Lincolnshire.

== Release ==
International Velvet was released in New York and Los Angeles on July 19, 1978.

Bryan Forbes's novelization of International Velvet was published to coincide with the film's release.

== See also ==
- List of films about horses
- List of films about horse racing
