= James McCallion =

Irish-American actor (1918–1991)

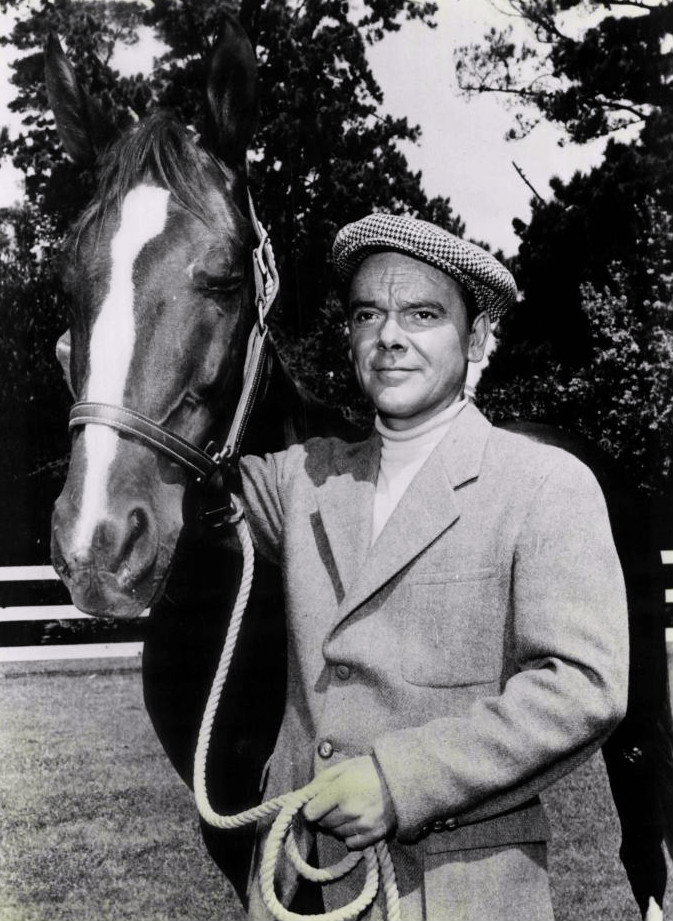
- McCallion in National Velvet (1960)
- Born: 27 September 1918; Derry, Ireland
- Died: 11 July 1991 (aged 72); Los Angeles, California, U.S.
- Occupation: Actor
- Years active: 1925–1983
- Spouse: Nora Marlowe (m. 1943; died 1977)
- Children: 2

James McCallion (27 September 1918 – 11 July 1991) was an Irish-American character actor whose career spanned more than five decades across film, television, radio, and theater. Known for his youthful start and wide range of supporting roles, he appeared in numerous stage productions, classic films, and popular television series.

== Early life ==
James McCallion was born in Derry, Ireland, and immigrated to the United States as a child. He began acting at the age of seven. At nine years old, he made his Broadway debut in 1927 alongside Leon Errol in Yours Truly. He later performed in other Broadway productions, including Roosty and But for the Grace of God. A 1937 article in the Daily World features McCallion in a photo with fellow young actor Robert Mayors, praising the play as "an outstanding contribution to the theatrical season".

== Stage and film career ==
McCallion's success on the stage and radio, particularly in shows like Billy and Betty, brought him to the attention of Hollywood studios. His early film roles included appearances in Boy Slaves (1939), Code of the Streets (1939), and Pride of the Blue Grass (1939).

== Television ==
McCallion appeared on television in over a hundred programs from the 1950s through the early 1980s. He starred as Mi Taylor in the NBC television series National Velvet (1960–1962), a role originally played by Mickey Rooney in the 1944 film.

== Personal life ==
McCallion was married to actress Nora Marlowe from 1943 until her death in 1977. They had two children, Denis McCallion and Tracey McCallion Campbell. Their son Denis later became a television producer, and their daughter Tracey worked as a personal assistant to many people in the entertainment industry.

== Death ==
James McCallion died on July 11, 1991, at Valley Presbyterian Hospital in Van Nuys, California. His daughter, Tracey McCallion Campbell, stated he had suffered a heart attack after undergoing treatment for kidney failure. He was 72 years old.

== Filmography ==
=== Film ===
Year	Title	Role	Notes
1939	Boy Slaves	Tim	
1939	Code of the Streets	Danny Shay	
1939	Pride of the Blue Grass	Danny Lowman	
1939	The Man Who Dared	Ralph Carter	
1954	Vera Cruz	Little-Bit	
1954	Playgirl	Paul	
1955	Illegal	Allen Parker	
1955	Kiss Me Deadly	Uncredited	
1955	The Big Combo	Frank – Lab Technician	
1959	North by Northwest	Plaza Valet (uncredited)	
1963	PT 109	Pat McMahon	
1965	Strange Bedfellows	Old Man	
1966	The Russians Are Coming, the Russians Are Coming	Townsperson (uncredited)	
1967	Gunfight in Abilene	Smoky Staub	
1968	Coogan's Bluff	Room Clerk	
1970	How Do I Love Thee?	Pete McGurk	
1970	The Cockeyed Cowboys of Calico County	Dr. Henry	
1971	Skin Game	Stanfil	
1973	Cotter	Fireman	
1974	The Strange and Deadly Occurrence	Ardie Detweiller	Television film
1975	The Prisoner of Second Avenue	Mr. Cooperman	

=== Television ===
Year	Title	Role	Notes
1955	Gunsmoke	Various roles	3 episodes
1956–1957	Alfred Hitchcock Presents	Various roles	2 episodes
1957	Maverick	Charlie	1 episode
1957	Zane Grey Theatre	Robie White	1 episode
1959	The Twilight Zone	Reporter #1	1 episode
1959	Johnny Ringo	Grailey	1 episode
1959	Hawaiian Eye	Guest role	1 episode
1960–1962	National Velvet	Mi Taylor	58 episodes
1960	The Andy Griffith Show	Various roles	2 episodes
1963	The Outer Limits	Dr. Tremaine	1 episode
1963–1965	The Fugitive	Various roles	3 episodes
1965–1967	The F.B.I.	Various roles	5 episodes
1966	Misson: Impossible	Sparrow	1 episode
1966	The Girl from U.N.C.L.E.	Guest role	1 episode
1966	That Girl	Guest role	2 episodes
1967	The Invaders	Brennan	1 episode
1967	Ironside	Harrington	5 episodes
1967	Custer	Guest role	1 episode
1967–1971	Mannix	Various roles	3 episodes
1968	Adam-12	Cab Driver	1 episode
1968	Mayberry R.F.D.	Father	1 episode
1968	The Ghost & Mrs. Muir	Guest role	1 episode
1970	Bonanza	Guest role	1 episode
1971	Alias Smith and Jones	Guest role	1 episode
1971	Cannon	Melvin Blake	4 episodes
1972	Banyon	Guest role	1 episode
1972	The Streets of San Francisco	Guest role	1 episode
1973	Letters from Three Lovers	Al	Television film
1973–1975	Barnaby Jones	Various roles	3 episodes
1974	Police Woman	Guest role	1 episode
1975	Who Is the Black Dahlia?	Man in the Car (uncredited)	Television film
1976	The Rear Guard	Colonel Walsh	1 episode
