= Frederick Gibberd =

English architect, town planner and landscape designer

Sir Frederick Gibberd
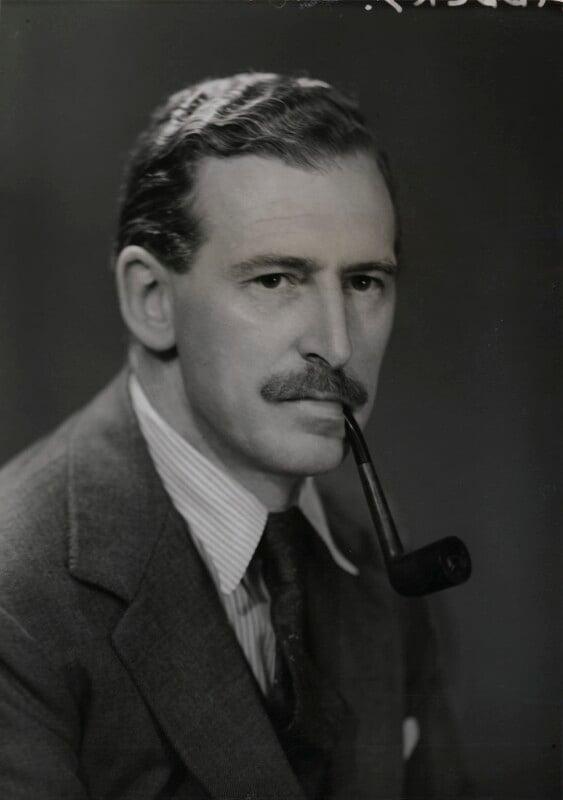
- Gibberd in 1950
- Born: 7 January 1908; Coventry, Warwickshire, England
- Died: 9 January 1984 (aged 76)
- Occupation: Architect
- Buildings: 1933–1936, Pullman Court, Streatham, London
- Projects: Harlow New Town, The Gibberd Garden, London Central Mosque, Liverpool Metropolitan Cathedral

Sir Frederick Ernest Gibberd CBE RA (7 January 1908 – 9 January 1984) was an English architect, town planner and landscape designer. He is particularly known for Liverpool Metropolitan Cathedral, his work in Harlow, Essex, and for the widely adopted BISF house.

== Career ==
Gibberd was born in Coventry, the eldest of the five children of a local tailor, and was educated at the city's King Henry VIII School. In 1925 he was articled to a firm of architects in Birmingham and studied architecture under William Bidlake at the Birmingham School of Art, where his roommate was F. R. S. Yorke.

A good friend of Sir Geoffrey Jellicoe, Gibberd's work was also influenced by Le Corbusier, Mies van der Rohe, and F. R. S. Yorke. He set up in practice in 1930, designing Pullman Court, Streatham Hill, London (1934–36), a housing development which launched his career. With the success of this scheme, Gibberd became established as the 'flat' architect (referring to blocks of flats) and went on to build several other schemes, including Park Court, Sydenham and Ellington Court, Southgate (both 1936), continuing to practise until the outbreak of the Second World War.

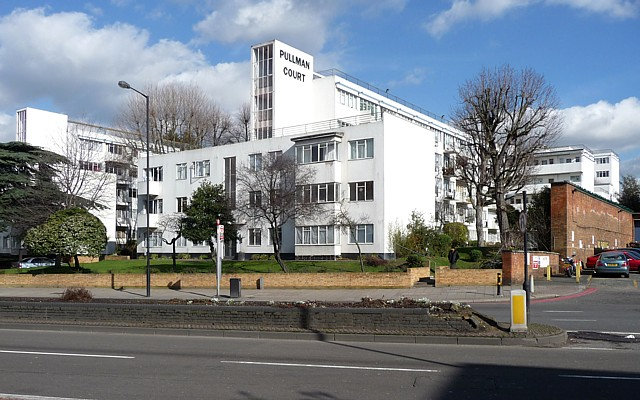
Pullman Court

Gibberd and Yorke collaborated on a number of publications, including the influential book The Modern Flat, which was published in 1937 and featured the then newly completed Pullman Court and Park Court, as well as many other European examples. Gibberd also designed the BISF house, a prefabricated form of council housing sponsored by the British Iron and Steel Federation and widely adopted by local authorities in Britain in the postwar years.

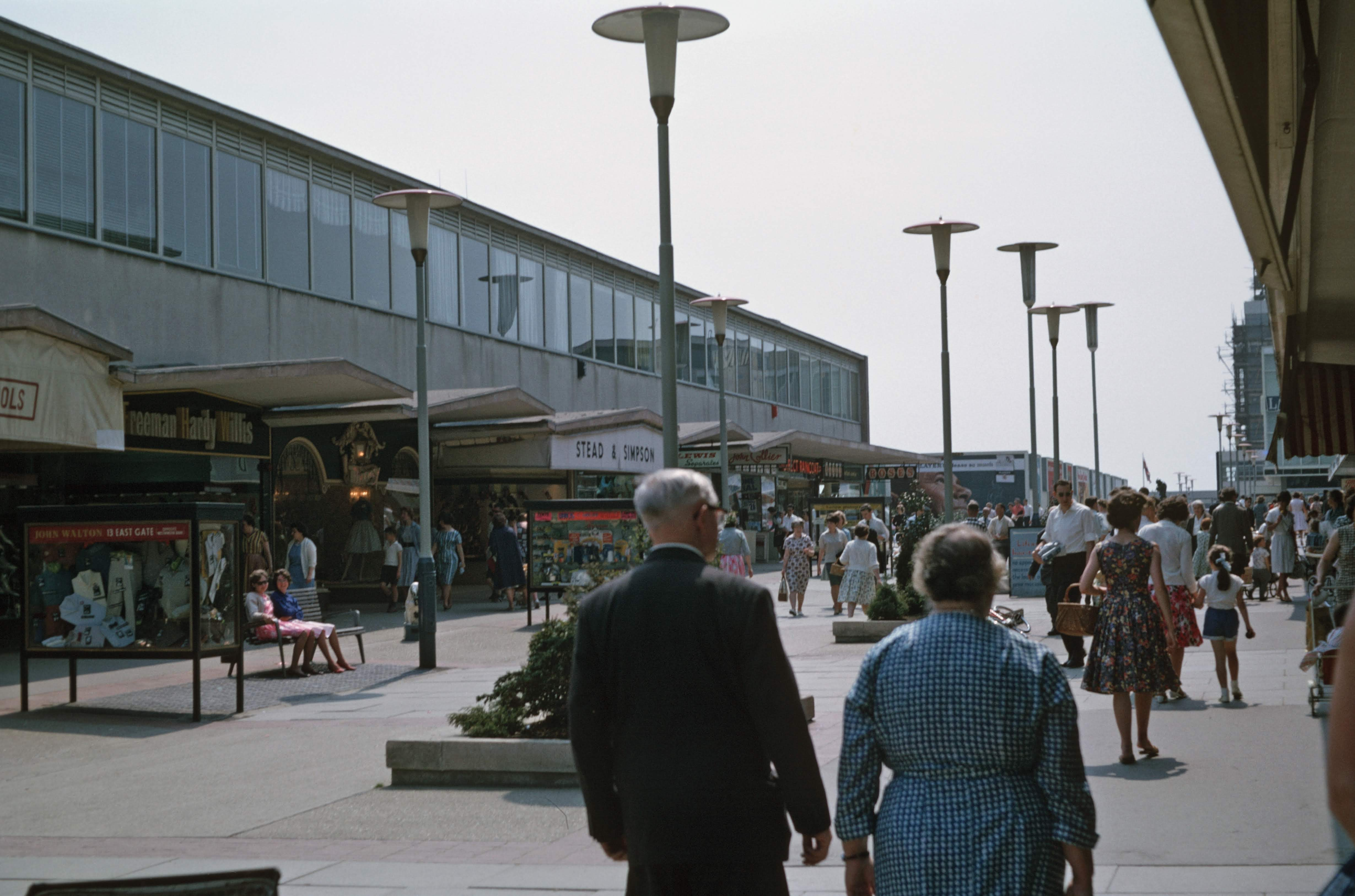
Harlow shopping centre in June 1963

Gibberd was consultant architect-planner for the Harlow new town development and spent the rest of his life living in the town he had designed. His most notable works there include The Lawn, Britain's first modern-style point block, consisting of nine storeys arranged in a butterfly design on an area of open ground surrounded by oak trees. The Lawn features a trompe-l'oeil pair of curved terraces facing a cricket green at Orchard Croft, which won a British Housing Award in 1951. The pioneering broken-silhouette flats in Morley Grove and much of the housing in Mark Hall neighbourhood is in its entirety a conservation area. The Harvey Centre lacks architectural distinction, but is notable as an early British example of a large purpose-built indoor shopping mall. His similarly pioneering Sports Centre has been demolished, as has the original town hall. The Water Gardens, although listed by English Heritage, have been spoilt by the abutment of a car park and shopping centre. The garden of his own house at Marsh Lane (Gibberd Garden), on the outskirts of Harlow, a mixture of formal and informal design, contains architectural elements salvaged from his reconstruction of Coutts Bank in London.

A further achievement by Gibberd in planning Harlow is his incorporation of works by many leading architects of the postwar years, such as FRS Yorke, Powell & Moya, Graham Dawbarn, John Poulson, Maxwell Fry & Jane Drew, Michael Neylan, William Crabtree, Leonard Manasseh, ECP Monson, Gerard Goalen, Gerald Lacoste, Richard Sheppard and H. T. Cadbury-Brown. A substantial collection of public sculptures is visible around the town, including works by Henry Moore, Elisabeth Frink, Auguste Rodin and Barbara Hepworth.

Gibberd wrote Harlow: The story of a New Town in collaboration with Len White and Ben Hyde Harvey. In 1953 he published Town Design a book on the forms, processes, and history of the subject.

== Personal life ==
He married first Dorothy Phillips, with whom he had one son and two daughters. She died in 1970. He then married Mrs Patricia Fox-Edwards on 30 March 1972. They remained married until his death.

Gibberd was made a CBE in 1954 and knighted in 1967.

== Legacy ==
His architectural firm, Frederick Gibberd Partnership, continues to practise in London.

In 2019, a new school in Harlow was named Sir Frederick Gibberd College. Built by Caledonian Modular from 198 prefabricated modules, the school was forced to close in August 2023 due to concerns about structural irregularities. In December 2023, the DfE confirmed that the college would be demolished and rebuilt.

== Notable buildings ==
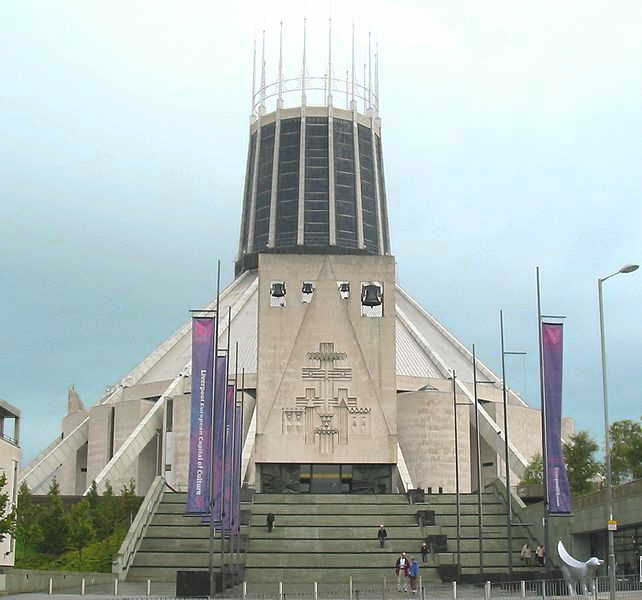
Liverpool Metropolitan Cathedral

- Harlow New Town
- London Central Mosque
- Liverpool Metropolitan Cathedral
- Didcot Power Station, Oxfordshire, England

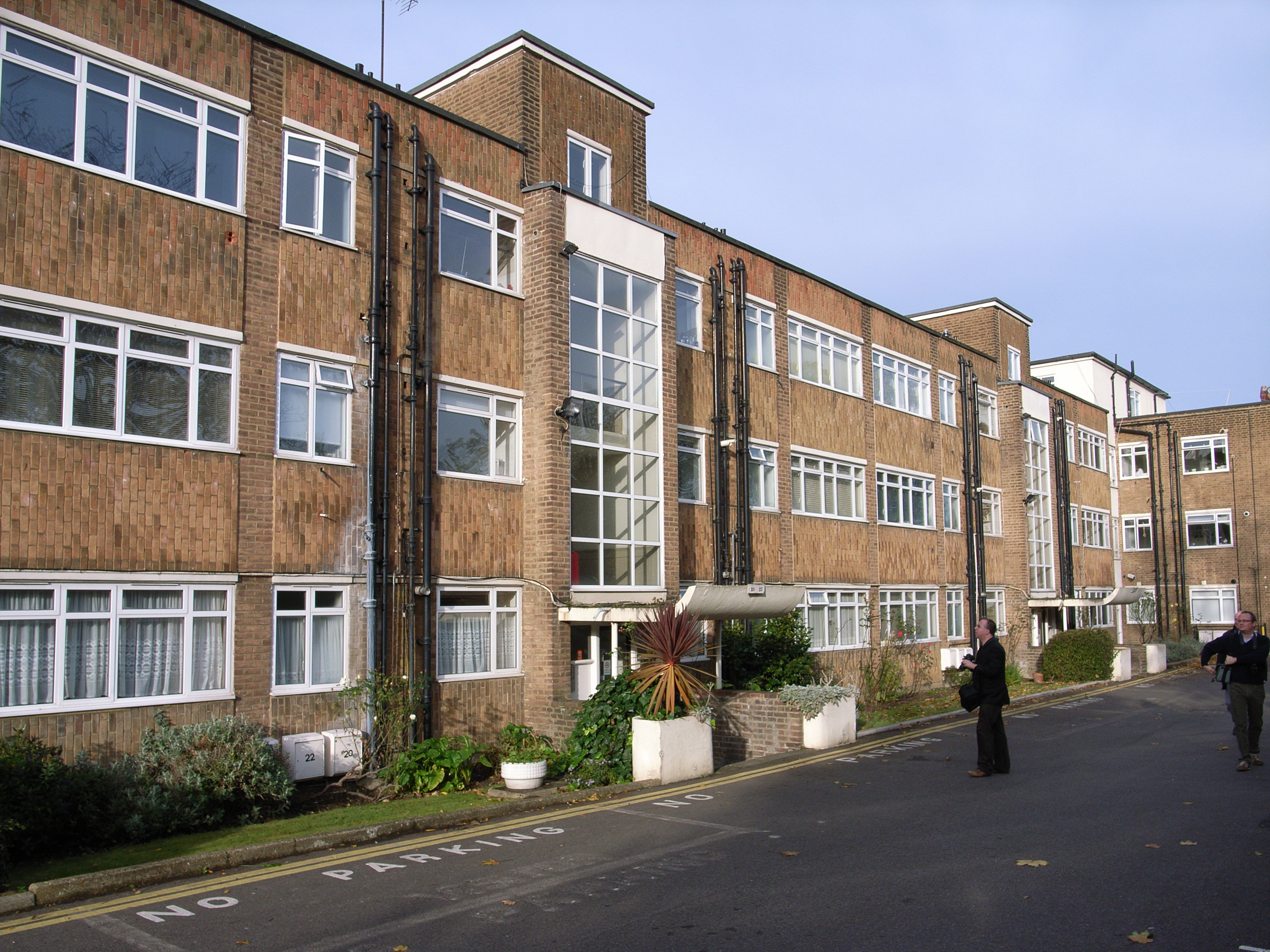
Ellington Court, Southgate

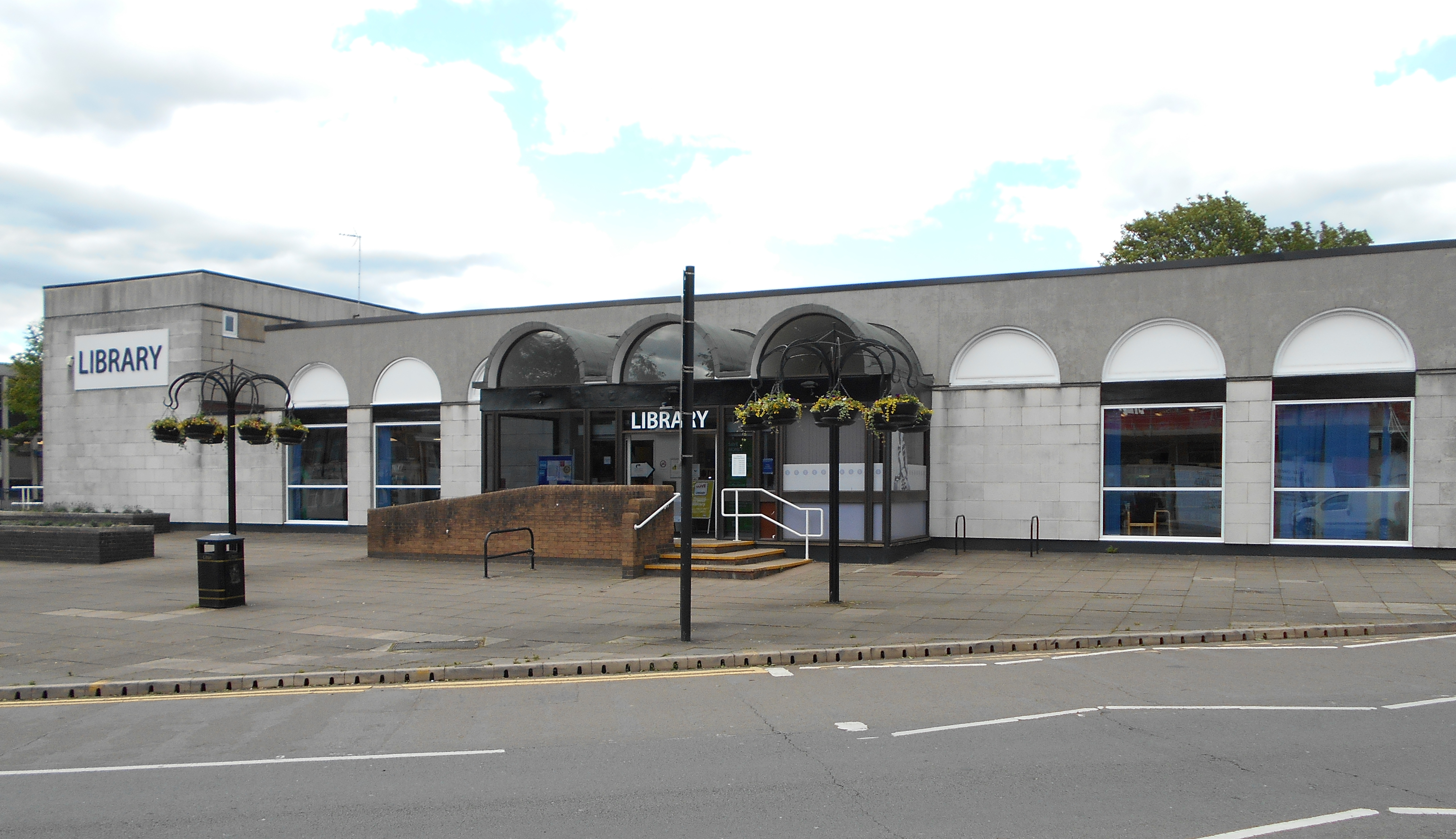
Nuneaton Library

A list of buildings by Frederick Gibberd

- 1933–1936, Pullman Court, Streatham, London
- 1936, Park Court, Sydenham, London
- 1937, Ellington Court, Southgate, London
- 1937–1939, Macclesfield Nurses Home, Cheshire, England
- 1945–1949, Somerford Estate, Hackney, London
- 1946–1963, Nuneaton Town Centre, Warwickshire, England
- 1949–1951, Chrisp Street Market and associated housing, Poplar, London (part of the Lansbury Estate)
- 1950 Orchard Croft Housing Estate & The Stow (Shopping centre), Harlow, Essex, England
- 1950–1969, Terminal Buildings, Heathrow Airport, near London (including the old Terminal 1, Terminal 2, and Queens Building)
- 1951, The Lawn, Harlow, Essex, England
- 1952, Market Square, Harlow, Essex, England
- 1953–1961, Ulster Hospital, Belfast
- 1956, Bath Technical College, Somerset, England
- 1956–1968, Civic Centre, Saint Albans, Hertfordshire, England
- 1958, Derwent Reservoir, Durham and Northumberland, England
- 1958, The Beckers, Rectory Road, Hackney, London
- 1958–1961, Kingsgate Estate, Hackney, London
- 1959–1969, Civic Centre, Doncaster, Yorkshire, England
- 1962, College of Technology, Kingston-Upon-Hull, England
- 1962, Sydenham, Leamington Spa
- 1959–1968, Fulwell Cross Library, Ilford
- 1960–1966, Priory Square, Birmingham, England
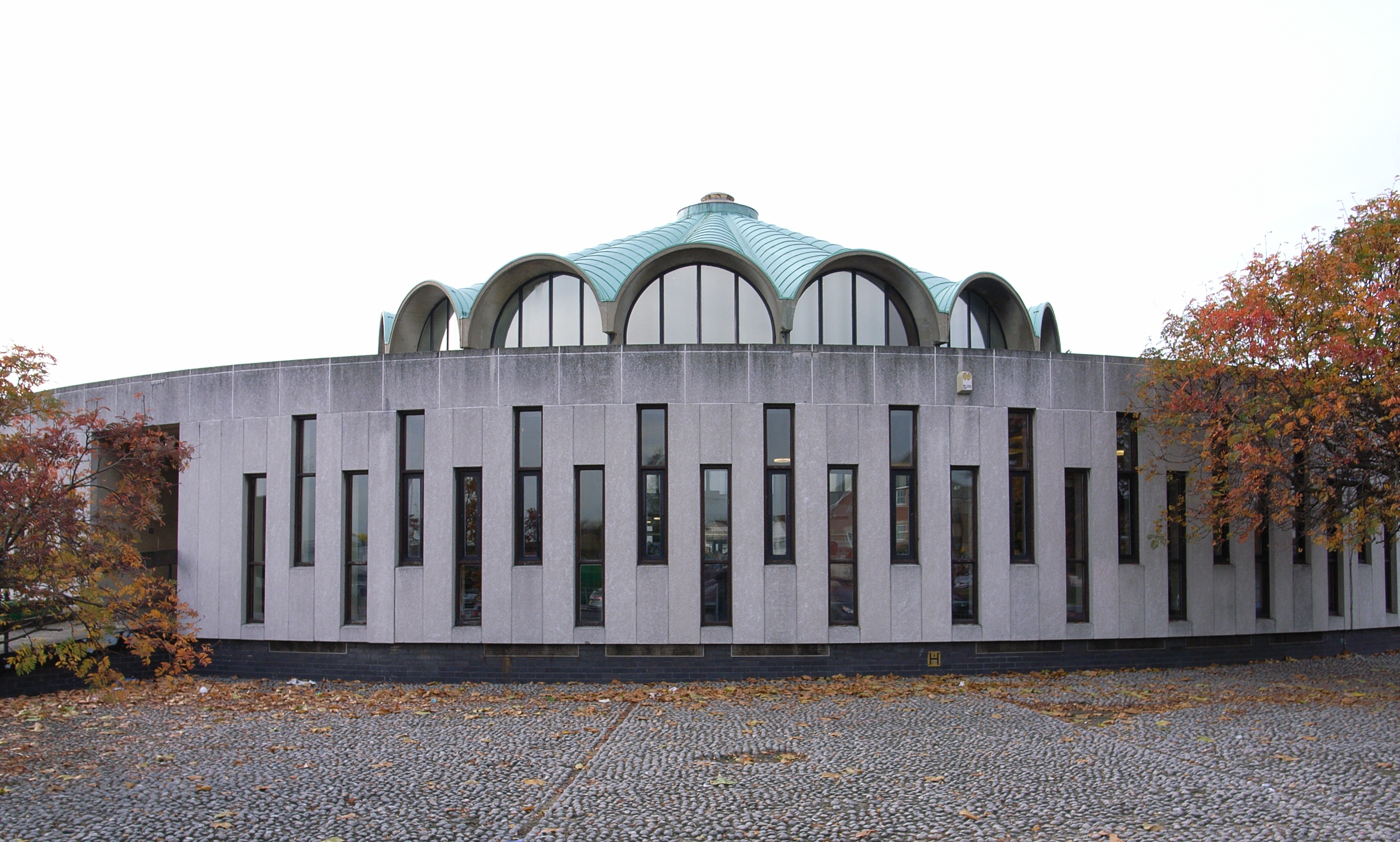
  Fulwell Cross Library, Ilford
- 1960–1967, Roman Catholic Cathedral, Liverpool, England
- 1961, Morley Grove Flats, Harlow, Essex, England
- 1962–1966, Douai Abbey, Berkshire, England
- 1964, Saint George's Chapel, Heathrow Airport, near London
- 1964, Water Gardens, Harlow, Essex, England
- 1965, Chapel, De La Salle College, Middleton, Lancashire, England
- 1964–1968, Didcot Power Station, Oxfordshire, England
- 1965–1974, Edmonton Green, Edmonton, London
- 1966–1975, Arundel Great Court, Strand, London
- 1968–1975, InterContinental London Park Lane
- 1969, Coutts Bank Headquarters, The Strand, London
- 1970-1975, 10 Spring Gardens, British Council headquarters
- 1970–1977, London Central Mosque
- 1972, Royal Spa Centre, Leamington Spa

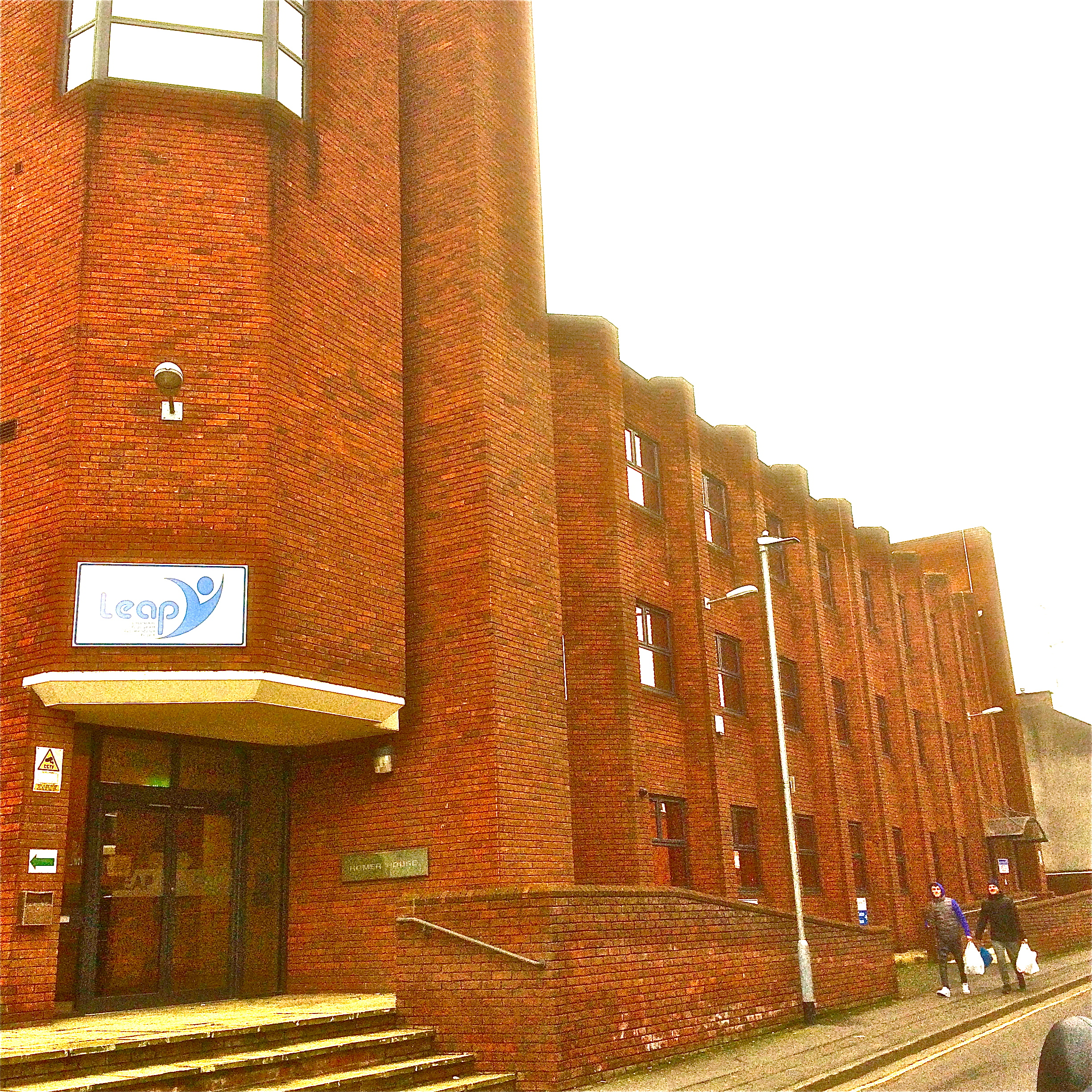
Homer House, Monson Street, Lincoln 1973

- 1973, Homer House, Monson Street, Lincoln, England. Described by Pevsner as Two staggered wings of offices either side of a service block. Red brick with an emphatic chamfering of angles and a strong vertical accent of load-bearing buttress piers dividing the main elevations into seven and eight bays. The overall impact is of somewhat fortress-like austerity.
- 1973-1974. Thomas Cooper Memorial Chapel, High Street, Lincoln, England.
- 1980, The Harvey Centre, Harlow, Essex, England

== Selected publications ==
- The Architecture of England: from Norman Times to the Present Day. Architectural Press. 1938
- Built in Furniture in Great Britain. Alec Tiranti, 1948.
- Harlow: The story of a New Town (With Len White and Ben Hyde Harvey). 1980.
- Town Design a book on the forms, processes, and history of the subject. 1953.
