= The Lawn (Harlow) =

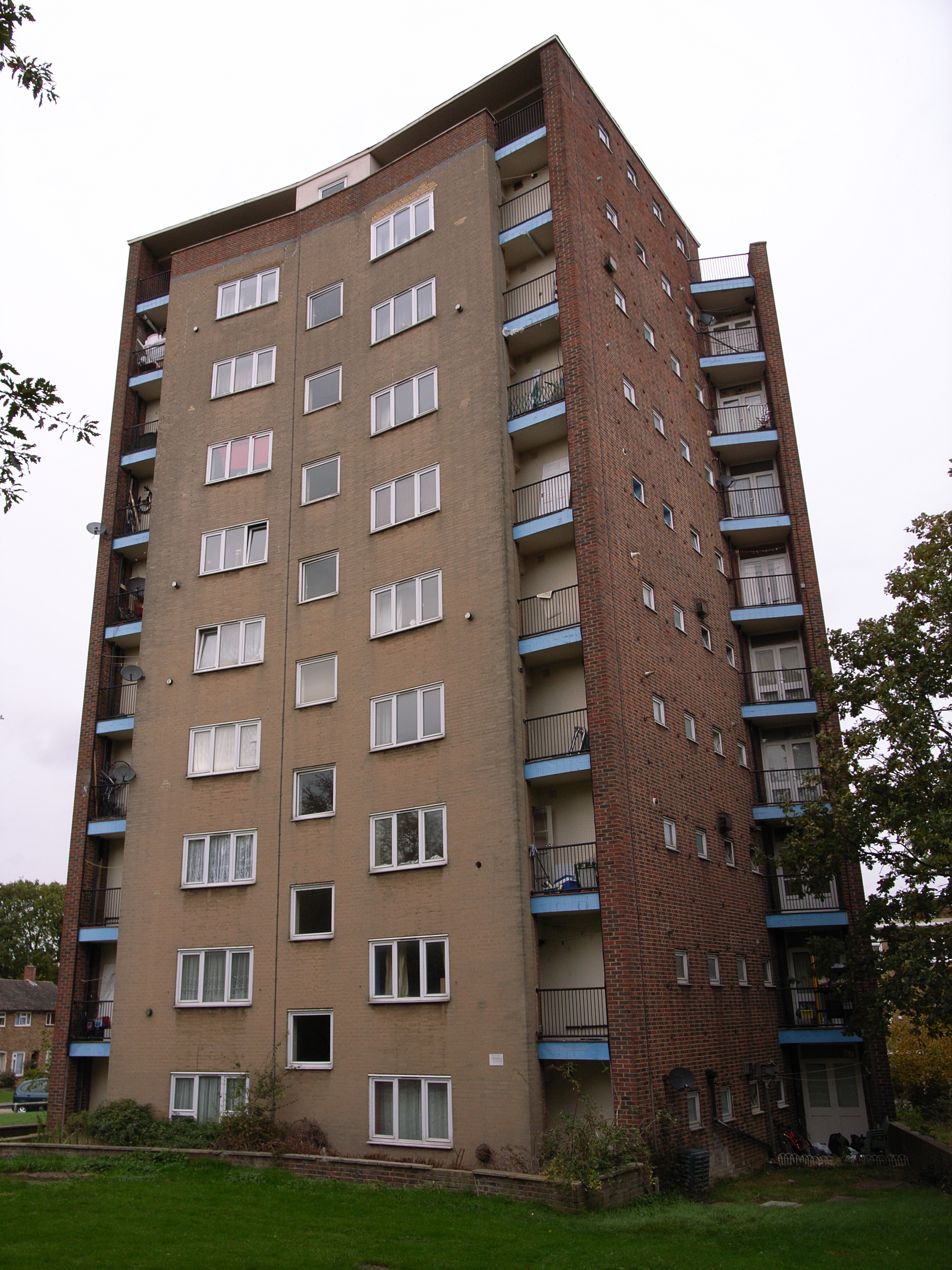
- The Lawn in Harlow, Essex.
- Interactive map of the The Lawn area

General information
- Type: Residential
- Architectural style: Brutalist / Modernist
- Location: Harlow, Essex, The Lawn, Harlow CM20 2JX
- Coordinates: 51°46′49.7″N 0°07′31.0″E
- Completed: 1951
- Opening: 1951

Height
- Top floor: 10

Technical details
- Structural system: Steel frame
- Floor count: 10

Design and construction
- Architect: Frederick Gibberd

Listed Building – Grade II
- Designated: 22 Dec 1998
- Reference no.: 1246029
- Developer: Harlow Development Corporation

The Lawn is a mid-twentieth-century low-rise building located on the outskirts of Old Harlow, to the east of the town of Harlow, Essex, England.

The building is noted as being the first residential tower block in the UK, as well as being the location of its first pedestrian precinct. The structure was completed in 1951 to coincide with the Festival of Britain. It was designated a Grade II listed building in 1998.

== Construction ==
Architect Sir Frederick Gibberd was appointed master planner for Harlow New Town in 1946, tasked with constructing the estate largely using two-storey houses with a private garden. Gibberd however was a keen proponent of mixed development styles, and insisted (to the Company's disapproval) that 20-30% of the site include flats.

The building has an unconventional ‘butterfly’ shape, built so as to preserve a number of old oak trees within its vicinity, as well as to give each flat a south-facing balcony. Nine residential floors each have four flats per floor, with a total of 36 flats in the building.

Upon completion, The Lawn was awarded a Ministry of Health Housing medal.

== Response ==
The building marked the beginning of a long period of construction of high rise residential buildings, which by 1975 had produced a total of "440,000 high-rise flats for public housing" in the UK. The government at the time offered a subsidy for every storey added to projects.

Harlow was notably one of few towns to see council tower block construction into the late 1980s, despite changing Government policies, concluding with the construction of Netteswell Tower in 1986.

== See also ==
- Tower blocks in Great Britain
