= Robert J. Kern =

American film editor (1885–1972)

- Born: March 29, 1885
- Died: May 30, 1972 (aged 87)
- Occupation: Film editor
- Relatives: Hal C. Kern (brother)

Robert James Kern (March 29, 1885 – May 30, 1972) was an American film editor with more than sixty feature film credits. He is known for editing National Velvet (1944), which won him the Academy Award for Best Film Editing. National Velvet was one of thirteen films that Kern edited with director Clarence Brown. He also made seven films with director W. S. Van Dyke, including three of the Thin Man series. Kern was nominated for the Academy Award for David Copperfield (1935), which was directed by George Cukor.

His brother, Hal C. Kern, was also a film editor. As of 2017, they are the only instance of two brothers both winning an Academy Award for Best Editing. Hal Kern won for Gone with the Wind (1939).

== Selected filmography ==
- Bachelor's Paradise (1928)
- George Washington Cohen (1928)
- The Tragedy of Youth (1928)

== See also ==
- List of film director and editor collaborations (with Clarence Brown)
