= Strange Bedfellows (1965 film) =

1965 American comedy film directed by Melvin Frank

- Theatrical poster
- Directed by: Melvin Frank
- Screenplay by: Melvin Frank; Michael Pertwee
- Story by: Norman Panama; Melvin Frank
- Produced by: Melvin Frank; Hal C. Kern; Norman Panama
- Starring: Rock Hudson; Gina Lollobrigida; Gig Young; Edward Judd; Terry-Thomas; Arthur Haynes
- Cinematography: Leo Tover
- Edited by: Gene Milford
- Music by: Leigh Harline
- Production companies: Fernwood Productions; Panama Productions; Gibraltar Productions
- Distributed by: Universal Pictures
- Release date: February 10, 1965
- Running time: 99 minutes
- Country: United States
- Language: English

Strange Bedfellows is a 1965 American romantic comedy film directed by Melvin Frank and starring Rock Hudson, Gina Lollobrigida, Gig Young, and Terry-Thomas. It was co-produced by Hudson's company, Gibraltar Productions, Frank's Fernwood Productions, and Panama's Panama Productions, and released by Universal Pictures.

== Plot ==
Carter, a wealthy American and Toni, a bohemian Italian woman meet in London, and impulsively marry. After finding they have virtually nothing in common, they separate. Seven years later, just days before they are to take steps to move forward on their divorce, they meet again and begin to rekindle the romance. More turmoil ensues as Carter tries to establish a 'respectable family life' in order to ensure a promotion, and Toni continues involving herself in public protests.

== Cast ==
- Rock Hudson as Carter Harrison
- Gina Lollobrigida as Toni Vincente
- Gig Young as Richard Bramwell
- Edward Judd as Harry Jones
- Terry-Thomas as Assistant Mortician
- Arthur Haynes as Carter's Taxi Driver
- Howard St. John as J. L. Stevens
- Nancy Kulp as Aggressive Woman
- David King as Toni's Taxi Driver
- Peggy Rea as Mavis Masters
- Joseph Sirola as Petracini
- Lucy Landau as Jolly Woman
- Bernard Fox as Policeman
- James McCallion as Old Man
- Edith Atwater as Mrs. Stevens
- Hedley Mattingly as Bagshot
- John Orchard as Radio Dispatcher
- Henry Corden as Sheik's Interpreter (uncredited)
- Maurice Dallimore as Gentleman in Rain (uncredited)
- Noel Drayton as Cab Driver (uncredited)
- Jack Good as Binky Waring (uncredited)
- Simon Scott as Jim Slade, Divorce Lawyer (uncredited)

== Release ==
The film earned rentals in North America of $2,750,000. Strange Bedfellows was available on DVD on July 1, 2003.

== Novelization ==
Slightly in advance of the film's release, as was the custom of the era, a paperback novelization of the screenplay was published by Pyramid Books. The author was renowned crime and western novelist Marvin H. Albert, who also made something of a cottage industry out of movie tie-ins. He seems to have been the most prolific screenplay novelizer of the late '50s through mid '60s, and, during that time, the preeminent specialist at light comedy.

== Reception ==
The New York World-Telegram and The Sun was ambivalent: "Rock Hudson is settling deeper and deeper into a plot pattern in all his movies. He aims a mesh of deception at his girl about his identity or peril to his life and then we all wait for complications. The girl is alternately dewy-eyed or roaring with anger, depending how well the fraud progresses. Rock meets every turn like a flailing windmill of righteousness. Movies have been wearing out the idea for a half century, but Rock is at it again in 'Strange Bedfellows'....Rock never varies his performance so there is no reason to ask him to vary his plot as long as this one continues to be so acceptable to his enthusiastic multitudes. Gina Lollobrigida muffles her acting talents to fit into the pattern every bit as well as Doris Day ever did....In general...you can merely search your soul on how much you love Rock Hudson and there is your verdict on whether to see this picture."

== See also ==
- List of American films of 1965
