= Hal C. Kern =

American film editor (1894–1985)

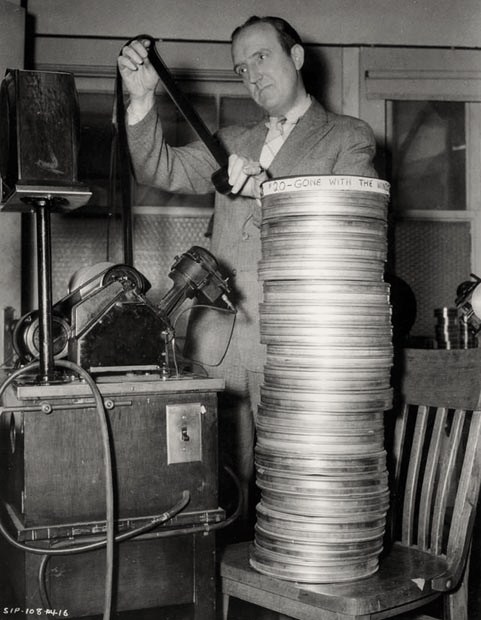
- Editing Gone with the Wind in 1939
- Born: July 14, 1894; Anaconda, Montana, U.S.
- Died: February 24, 1985 (aged 90); Los Angeles, California, U.S.
- Occupation: Film editor
- Years active: 1916–1963
- Relatives: Robert J. Kern (brother)

Hal C. Kern (July 14, 1894 – February 24, 1985) was an American film editor. He won the Academy Award for Best Film Editing for his work on Gone with the Wind. He was also nominated for Rebecca and Since You Went Away.

He began his editing career in 1915, cutting shorts at Inceville. A fire that started in his cutting room during the editing of the Thomas H. Ince film Civilization destroyed the entire studio, forcing him to move to Culver City. He eventually rose to prominence as a film editor there after being hired by Joseph M. Schenck to edit his films. He eventually got a job at MGM, where he spent his editing career.

His brother Robert J. Kern was also a distinguished film editor.
