= Lori Martin =

American actress

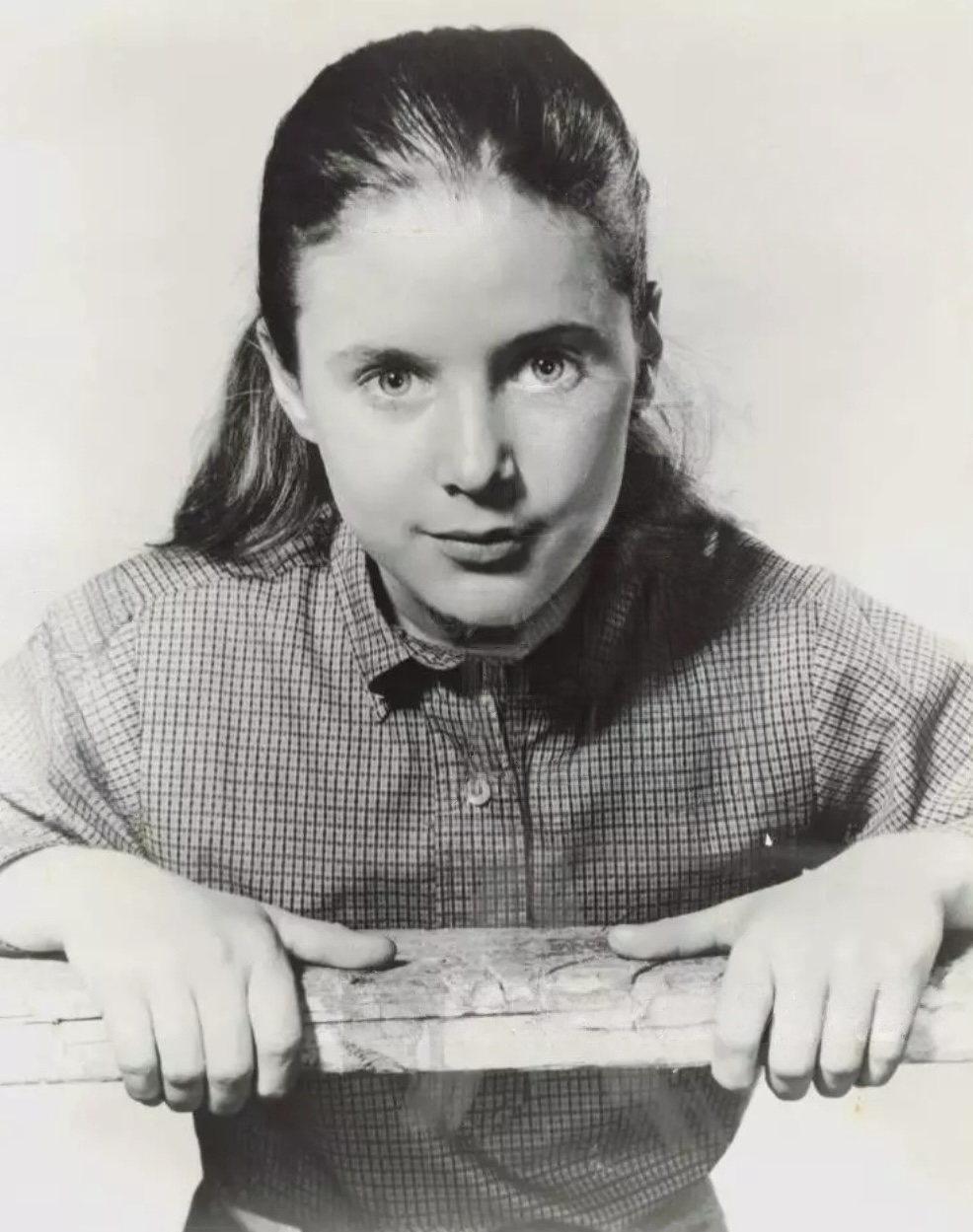
- Martin in 1961
- Born: Dawn Catherine Menzer; April 18, 1947; Glendale, California, U.S.
- Died: April 4, 2010 (aged 62); Oakhurst, California, U.S.
- Occupations: Film and television actress
- Years active: 1956–1970
- Spouse(s): Charles Breitenbucher (m. 19??; died 1999)
- Children: 1

Dawn Catherine Menzer (April 18, 1947 – April 4, 2010), known professionally as Lori Martin, was an American actress. A child actress for most of her career, she first achieved recognition as the title character of the NBC drama series National Velvet (1960–1962). Her most prominent film role was in the 1962 thriller Cape Fear, where she portrayed Gregory Peck's daughter.

== Early career ==
Lori Martin was born Dawn Catherine Menzer in Glendale, California, at 10:02 a.m.; her fraternal twin sister, Doree, arrived four minutes later. She weighed only 5 pounds and measured just 18 inches at birth. She spent the first few weeks of her life in an incubator, during which time her survival was somewhat doubtful. Her father, Russell C. Menzer, was an MGM and Warner Brothers commercial artist and art director. She had a younger brother, Stephen Menzer, and an older sister, Jean Coulter, a veteran Hollywood stuntwoman who doubled for the lead actresses on Ironside and Charlie's Angels.

When Lori was six years old, her mother took her to an agent who specialized in child actors. She thought that acting might be a healthy outlet for Lori. When later asked what inspired her to be an actress, Martin said, "The best time in my life was when I was about four. Doree and I had to go live with my aunt in Ponca City, Oklahoma. My mother got sick and Daddy had to go to work every day, so we couldn't stay here. I didn't want to come back. I cried and cried. That was when I decided, if I had to come back, I'd be an actress. I started getting parts immediately, and my little brother was signed by the same agent, but he lacked my interest in acting. I just loved it."

Martin auditioned so well that her parents soon allowed her to attend them by herself. Her mother recalled, "I'll never forget the first interview she went on. It was for a Chrysler commercial, and my car broke down about six blocks from the studio. I had to stay with the car, but Lori was all for going on in herself. She got out of the car, walked six blocks, found the right office, told the receptionist who she was, went in for her interview and got the job. Since then I've usually waited outside in the car and she's handled everything herself."

As well as appearing in several commercials, including one for which her father designed the set and a Milky Way candy commercial, she won parts in the films Machine-Gun Kelly (1958), The FBI Story (1959), and Cash McCall (1959). She appeared in several television series, including Medic, Wagon Train, Alfred Hitchcock Presents, Leave It to Beaver, and Whirlybirds.

== National Velvet ==
At the age of 12, Martin was the 975th young hopeful to be auditioned for the role of Velvet Brown in the NBC television version of National Velvet, a role which brought her to wide attention. After being included in the final three, she was interviewed ten more times before winning the part. When she won the role, her name was changed from Dawn Menzer to "Lori Martin". On the change of name, Martin later said, "I didn't like the name Lori at first. But I like it now. The reason I like it now is I've been brainwashed!" The show ran for fifty-eight episodes between 1960 and 1962.

== Cape Fear ==
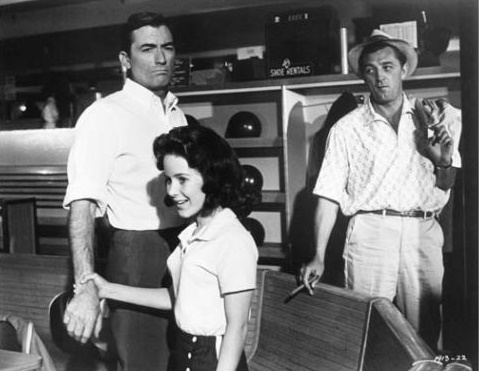
Gregory Peck, Martin and Robert Mitchum in Cape Fear

In 1962, at age 14, Martin gained further attention in the role of Nancy Bowden in the film Cape Fear, in which the character played by Robert Mitchum intends to do harm to her family. Martin later said that she delivered her best performance as Nancy but had nightmares for weeks after the filming of the scene in which her character is stalked by Mitchum's character. The director of the film, J. Lee Thompson, originally wanted Hayley Mills for Martin's part. Because he could not get Mills, however, he later admitted to having deliberately mistreated Martin during filming.

== Singing career ==
Martin released her only single on Del-Fi Records. Recorded at Radio Recorders in Hollywood in September 1963, the single included "The Home of the Boy I Love" and "Mine 'Til Monday" (Del Fi 4201). The song, produced by Barry Mann and written by Sylvester Bradford, was mistakenly credited to Barry Mann and Cynthia Weil.

== Later career ==
After Cape Fear, Martin made guest appearances in such television series as The Donna Reed Show, Slattery's People, Sam Benedict, Breaking Point, Please Don't Eat the Daisies, Leave It To Beaver, My Three Sons, and Family Affair.

== Later years ==
During the early 1970s, Martin temporarily stopped acting. She later recalled her reasoning behind her decision. "I'd been in the business long enough to know I'd been stereotyped. My mother was in poor health and I felt I had worked from such an early age I could take some time off and get a college education." A few years later, she tried to reactivate her career, but she became "discouraged by the many changes in casting and techniques".

Martin married Charles Breitenbucher, had a son, Brett, and moved to Westlake Village, California, under her married name, Dawn Breitenbucher. She later moved to Oakhurst. She occasionally attended autograph signings and ran a medical supplies company with her husband until his death in 1999.

In an article which was written at the height of her fame, she was quoted as saying that what she wanted to be when she grew up was "normal". Martin later recalled after her acting career had finished that it "was probably an accurate quote because that's what I wanted and as it turns out, that's what I am."

== Death ==
Martin died on April 4, 2010, in Oakhurst.

== Filmography ==
Film
Year	Title	Role	Notes
1958	Machine-Gun Kelly	Sherryl Vito	
1959	The FBI Story	Anne Hardesty at 8	Uncredited
1960	Cash McCall		
1962	Cape Fear	Nancy Bowden	
1963	Cri Cri el grillito cantor	Princesa Caramelo	
1966	The Chase	Cutie	
1968	The Angry Breed	Diane Patton	
Television
Year	Title	Role	Notes
1960–1962	National Velvet	Velvet Brown	58 episodes
1963	Leave It to Beaver	Mary Margaret Matthews	Episode: "Beaver Sees America"
1966/1970	My Three Sons	Mary Sue, Eve	Episodes: "Robbie's Double Life" "Love Thy Neighbor"
