= Anne Revere =

American actress (1903–1990)

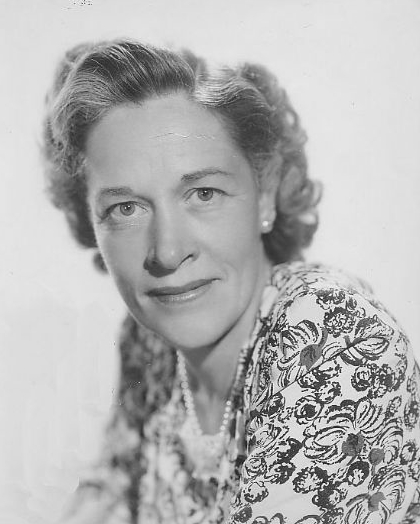
- Revere in the 1940s
- Born: June 25, 1903; New York City, U.S.
- Died: December 18, 1990 (aged 87); Locust Valley, New York, U.S.
- Resting place: Mount Auburn Cemetery
- Education: Wellesley College; American Laboratory Theatre
- Occupation: Actress
- Years active: 1931–1977
- Spouse: Samuel Rosen (m. 1935; died 1984)

Anne Revere (June 25, 1903 – December 18, 1990) was an American actress and a member of the board of the Screen Actors Guild. She was best known for her work on Broadway and her portrayals of mothers in a series of critically acclaimed films. An outspoken critic of the House Un-American Activities Committee, her name appeared in Red Channels: The Report on Communist Influence in Radio and Television in 1950 and she was subsequently blacklisted.

Revere won an Academy Award for her supporting role in the film National Velvet (1944). She was also nominated in the same category for The Song of Bernadette (1943) and Gentleman's Agreement (1947). She won a Tony Award for her performance in Lillian Hellman's play Toys in the Attic in 1960.

== Early life ==
Born in New York City, Revere was a direct descendant of American Revolution hero Paul Revere. Her father, Clinton, was a stockbroker, and she was raised on the Upper West Side and in Westfield, New Jersey, where she graduated from Westfield High School. In 1926, she graduated from Wellesley College. Despite her unsuccessful attempts to join dramatic groups in high school and (initially) in college, she eventually was successful at Wellesley and studied dramatics there. She went on to enroll at the American Laboratory School to study acting with Maria Ouspenskaya and Richard Boleslavsky.

== Career ==
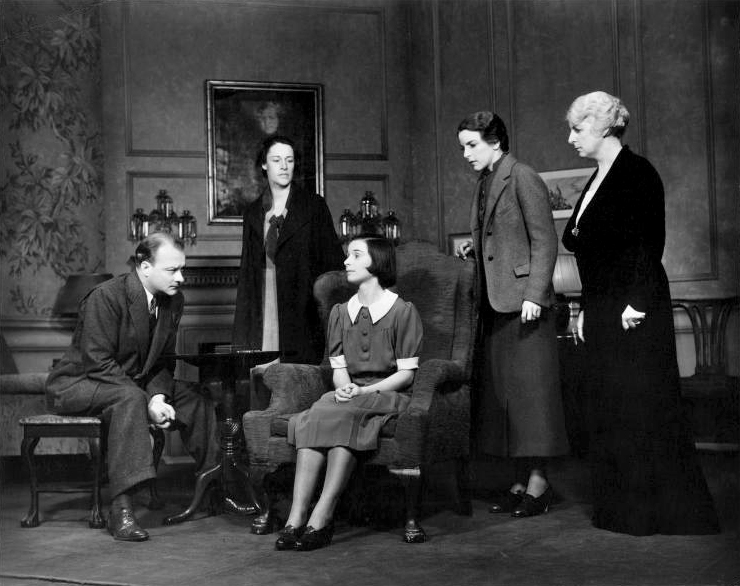
Robert Keith, Anne Revere, Florence McGee, Katherine Emery and Katherine Emmet in the original Broadway production of The Children's Hour (1934)

Revere gained early acting experience in regional and stock theater troupes. She made her Broadway debut in 1931 in The Great Barrington. Three years later, she went to Hollywood to reprise her stage role in the film adaptation of Double Door. She returned to Broadway to create the role of Martha Dobie in the original 1934 production of The Children's Hour, and in later years, she appeared on the New York stage in As You Like It, The Three Sisters, and Toys in the Attic, for which she won the 1960 Tony Award for Best Performance by a Featured Actress in a Play.

Revere worked steadily as a character actress in films, appearing in nearly three dozen between 1934 and 1951. She was frequently cast in the role of a matriarch and played mother to Elizabeth Taylor, Jennifer Jones, Gregory Peck, John Garfield, and Montgomery Clift. She was nominated for the Academy Award for Best Supporting Actress three times and won for her performance in National Velvet. Additional screen credits included The Song of Bernadette, Gentleman's Agreement, The Keys of the Kingdom, Body and Soul, and A Place in the Sun.

In 1951, Revere resigned from the board of the Screen Actors Guild. At the time, she was an active member of the American Communist Party. She later pleaded the Fifth Amendment and refused to testify before the House Un-American Activities Committee. A Place in the Sun was her last film role for two decades. She returned to the screen in Tell Me That You Love Me, Junie Moon.

In 1962, television director Joseph Hardy fought for Revere to appear in the popular soap opera A Time for Us. ABC finally agreed to cast Revere in the role and after that Revere appeared frequently in television soap operas like A Flame in the Wind, The Edge of Night, Search for Tomorrow, and Ryan's Hope.

Revere and her husband, theatre director Samuel Rosen, moved to New York and opened an acting school, and she continued to work in summer stock and regional theater productions and on television.

== Personal life ==
Revere married Rosen on April 11, 1935, and they remained wed until his death in 1984. Revere supported Progressive Party candidate Henry A. Wallace's campaign in 1948.

== Illness and death ==
Revere died of pneumonia in her home at Locust Valley, New York, on December 18, 1990, at the age of 87. She was buried at Mount Auburn Cemetery in Cambridge, Massachusetts.

== Filmography ==
Year	Title	Role	Notes
1934	Double Door	Caroline Van Brett	
1940	One Crowded Night	Mae Andrews	
1940	The Howards of Virginia	Mrs. Betsy Norton	
1941	The Devil Commands	Mrs. Blanche Walters	
1941	Men of Boys Town	Mrs. Fenely	
1941	The Flame of New Orleans	Giraud's Sister	
1941	H.M. Pulham, Esq.	Miss Redfern, John's Secretary	Uncredited
1941	Remember the Day	Miss Nadine Price	
1941	Design for Scandal	Nettie, Porter's Maid	Uncredited
1942	Meet the Stewarts	Geraldine Stewart	
1942	The Falcon Takes Over	Jessie Florian	Uncredited
1942	Are Husbands Necessary?	Anna	
1942	The Gay Sisters	Miss Ida Orner	
1942	Star Spangled Rhythm	Sarah	Uncredited
1943	The Meanest Man in the World	Kitty Crockett, Clark's Secretary	
1943	Shantytown	Mrs. Gorty	
1943	Old Acquaintance	Belle Carter	
1943	The Song of Bernadette	Louise Soubirous	Nominated — Academy Award for Best Supporting Actress
1944	Standing Room Only	Major Harriet Cromwell	
1944	Rainbow Island	Queen Okalana	
1944	The Thin Man Goes Home	Crazy Mary	
1944	Sunday Dinner for a Soldier	Agatha Butterfield	
1944	National Velvet	Mrs. Brown	Academy Award for Best Supporting Actress
1944	The Keys of the Kingdom	Agnes Fiske	
1945	Don Juan Quilligan	Mrs. Cora Rostigaff	
1945	Fallen Angel	Clara Mills	
1946	Dragonwyck	Abigail Wells	
1947	The Shocking Miss Pilgrim	Alice Pritchard	
1947	Carnival in Costa Rica	Mama Elsa Molina	
1947	Forever Amber	Mother Red Cap	
1947	Body and Soul	Anna Davis	
1947	Gentleman's Agreement	Mrs. Green	Nominated — Academy Award for Best Supporting Actress
1947	Secret Beyond the Door	Caroline Lamphere	
1948	Scudda Hoo! Scudda Hay!	Judith Dominy	
1948	Deep Waters	Mary McKay	
1949	You're My Everything	Aunt Jane	
1951	The Great Missouri Raid	Mrs. Samuels	
1951	A Place in the Sun	Hannah Eastman	
1970	Tell Me That You Love Me, Junie Moon	Miss Farber	
1970	Macho Callahan	Crystal	
1976	Birch Interval	Mrs. Tanner	
