= Nanette Newman =

English actress and author (born 1934)

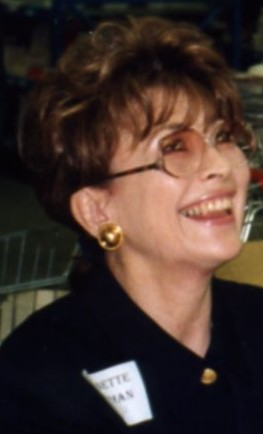
- Newman in 2008
- Born: 29 May 1934 (age 92); Northampton, Northamptonshire, England
- Education: Italia Conti Academy of Theatre Arts
- Years active: 1953–present
- Spouse: Bryan Forbes (m. 1955; died 2013)
- Children: 2, including Emma Forbes

Nanette Newman (born 29 May 1934) is an English actress and author. She appeared in nine films directed by her husband Bryan Forbes, including Séance on a Wet Afternoon (1964), The Whisperers (1967), Deadfall (1968), The Stepford Wives (1975) and International Velvet (1978), for which she won the Evening Standard Film Award for Best Actress. She was also nominated for the BAFTA Award for Best Actress in a Leading Role for another Forbes-directed film, The Raging Moon (1971).

== Early life ==
Newman was born in Northampton, Northamptonshire, England. Her parents were in show business, with her father being a reputed circus strongman. In the 1940s, she lived in Pullman Court, Streatham Hill. Newman was educated at Sternhold College, the Italia Conti Academy of Theatre Arts stage school and the Royal Academy of Dramatic Art in London.

== Career ==
Newman made her first screen appearance at age 11 in the 1945 short Here We Come Gathering: A Story of the Kentish Orchards. She appears in 1962 in the TV series Sir Francis Drake as Yana, a South American tribal native whose tribe is enslaved by the Spanish.

Her feature film debut, as a teenager, was in Personal Affair (1953). There followed a number of period roles, including the heroine in The Wrong Box (1966); The Madwoman of Chaillot (1969); The Raging Moon (1971), as a young woman in a wheelchair; and International Velvet (1978). In addition to her screen roles, she appeared in an episode of The Diary of Samuel Pepys as well as a guest appearance as the female lead, Geraldine McCloud, in an episode of The Saint (TV series) (Series 3-01, "The Miracle Tea Party").

Newman married actor-writer-director Bryan Forbes in 1955. She acted with Forbes in The League of Gentlemen (1960), which Forbes also scripted, and went on to appear in most of the feature films that Forbes directed, including The L-Shaped Room (1962), Seance on a Wet Afternoon (1964), The Wrong Box (1966), The Whisperers (1967), Deadfall (1968), The Madwoman of Chaillot (1969), The Raging Moon (1971), The Stepford Wives (1975) and International Velvet (1978).

In his 1983 book Adventures in the Screen Trade, scriptwriter William Goldman was critical of the fact that Forbes cast his wife (then in her early forties) as Carol, one of the robotic spouses in The Stepford Wives, and revealed that it led to a major rift between them. In Goldman's original script (of which, he claimed, about 75% was re-written by Forbes), the android replacement wives were meant to be like (Playboy) "Playmates come to life", the acme of youth and beauty, dressed in skimpy tennis shorts and T-shirts. Although Goldman conceded that Newman was both a good actress and attractive, she clearly did not fit his conception of the part ("a sex bomb she isn't"), and he objected to Forbes's decision to change the appearance of the 'wives' (making them older, more demure and much more conservatively dressed), expressing the view that Newman's casting "destroyed the reality of a story that was only precariously real to begin with". Goldman also recounted his misgivings about casting an Englishwoman to play an American – although, in the event, Newman delivered a perfect accent, and few viewers would have realised she was not American.

Newman is from a variety background, acting on stage and also appearing in television advertisements, including for Fairy Liquid. She was also a popular regular panellist on a revival of the BBC panel game show What's My Line? (1973–74). She also starred in the ITV sitcom Let There Be Love, which ran for two seasons, in 1982 and 1983.

In 1990, she was a contestant on Cluedo, facing off against Edward Hardwicke.

Newman is the author of thirty children's books and six cookery books; winning a Cookbook of the Year Award with The Summer Cookbook, and presented a children's television cookery programme, Fun Food Factory (1976), she appeared in the 1980s on TV-am, cooking during the show.

== Personal life ==
Newman met actor-writer-director Bryan Forbes in February 1953 on location at Marylebone railway shunting yards, while Forbes was co-starring in the film Wheel of Fate. Newman, then still at RADA, had been sent along for a job:

Bryan was committing suicide under a train. He came up on to the platform and introduced himself. I said: "How nice to meet you, Mr Forbes. There’s a chance I might be in your film." He said: "Well, I’m afraid this is the last day of shooting. They’ve brought you here under false pretences." He drove me home to make sure I was OK – and that was it... So, at the age of 18, I did the cleverest thing I’ve ever done: said 'Yes' when Bryan asked me to marry him. I don’t think I’ve topped that.

Newman and Forbes married on 27 August 1955, and had two daughters, Emma Forbes and Sarah Standing. They were married for 57 years, until Forbes's death in 2013. In her first interview after Forbes's death, Newman explained that one of the reasons they were able to keep their marriage together was Forbes's rule that he always took his family with him if he was working overseas for any period longer than two weeks.

== Filmography ==
- Personal Affair (1953)
- The League of Gentlemen (1960)
- Faces in the Dark (1960)
- The Rebel (1961)
- House of Mystery (1961)
- Pit of Darkness (1961)
- The L-Shaped Room (1962)
- Twice Round the Daffodils (1962)
- The Painted Smile (1962)
- The Wrong Arm of the Law (1963)
- Séance on a Wet Afternoon (1964)
- Of Human Bondage (1964)
- The Wrong Box (1966)
- The Whisperers (1967)
- Deadfall (1968)
- Journey into Darkness (1968)
- Captain Nemo and the Underwater City (1969)
- The Madwoman of Chaillot (1969)
- Oh! What a Lovely War (1969)
- The Raging Moon (1971)
- The Love Ban (1973)
- Man at the Top (1973)
- The Stepford Wives (1975)
- International Velvet (1978)
- Restless Natives (1985)
- The Mystery of Edwin Drood (1993)
