= Relf =

Surname

Relf is a southern English surname. It stems from the old French given name Riulf, which was derived from Germanic words ric (power) and wulf (wolf). Notable people with the surname include:

- Albert Relf (1874–1937), British cricketer
- Bob Relf (1937–2007), African American R&B and soul musician
- Carolyn Relf, Canadian geologist
- Chris Relf (born 1989), American football quarterback
- Douglas Relf (1907–1970), British artist
- Ernest Relf (1888–1918), English cricketer active from 1912 to 1914
- Jane Relf (born 1947), British singer, sister of Keith Relf of the Yardbirds
- Keith Relf (1943–1976), English musician, lead vocalist and harmonica player for the Yardbirds
- Patricia Relf, American author of numerous children's books
- Robert Relf (1924–2014), English political activist of the far right
- Robert Relf (cricketer) (1883–1965), English first class cricketer
- Robert Relf (rugby league) (born 1971), Australian rugby league footballer
- The Relf Sisters (Minnie Lee and Mary Alice Relf, born ca. 1960), subjects of a U.S. class-action lawsuit

== See also ==
- Relph, a variant of the surname Relf
- Relfs Bluff, Arkansas, a populated place in the United States
