= The League of Gentlemen (disambiguation) =

The League of Gentlemen is a British black comedy television series that premiered on BBC Two in 1999.

The League of Gentlemen may also refer to:

- The League of Gentlemen (novel), (1958)
- The League of Gentlemen (film), (1960)
- The League of Gentlemen (band)
- The League of Gentlemen (album), (1980)
- The League of Gentlemen, a film in the Pandora's Box TV documentary series (1992)
- The League of Gentlemen, a mid-1960s teenage group featuring Robert Fripp and Gordon Haskell

== See also ==
- The League of Extraordinary Gentlemen, (1999) a comic book series
- The League of Extraordinary Gentlemen (film), (2003)
- The League of Gentlemen's Apocalypse, (2005) film based on the television series
