= Caper story =

Subgenre of crime fiction

The caper story is a subgenre of crime fiction. The typical caper story involves one or more crimes (especially thefts, swindles, or occasionally kidnappings) perpetrated by the main characters in full view of the reader. The actions of police or detectives attempting to prevent or solve the crimes may also be chronicled, but are not the main focus of the story.

The caper story is distinguished from the straight crime story by elements of humor, adventure, or unusual cleverness or audacity. The main characters often have comical idiosyncrasies and the law enforcement individuals are characterized by ineptitude or inadequacies. The criminals comically plan a crime with details unnecessary for the nature of the crime, and humour is created when their personalities clash and their quirks are exposed. For instance, the Dortmunder stories of Donald E. Westlake are highly comic tales involving unusual thefts by a gang of offbeat characters—in different stories Dortmunder's gang steals the same gem several times, steals an entire branch bank, and kidnaps someone from an asylum by driving a stolen train onto the property. By contrast, the same author's Parker stories (published under the name Richard Stark) are grimly straightforward accounts of mundane crime—the criminal equivalent of the police procedural. Others, such as Lawrence Block's Bernie Rhodenbarr novels, feature a role reversal, an honest criminal and crooked cop, and the use of burglar Rhodenbarr's criminal talents to solve murders.

A caper may appear as a subplot in a larger work. For example, Tom Sawyer's plot to steal Jim out of slavery in the last part of Huckleberry Finn is a classic caper.

== Etymology ==
The verb to caper means to leap in a frolicsome way, and probably derives from capriole, which derives from the Latin for goat (Capra). The noun caper means a frolicsome leap, a capricious escapade or an illegal or questionable act.

== Examples ==
=== Literature ===
- Arsène Lupin, Gentleman Burglar (1907) by Maurice Leblanc
- "The Ransom of Red Chief" (1910) by O. Henry: two kidnappers find that the little boy they are holding for ransom is more dangerous than the law
- early stories of "The Saint" (beginning in 1928) by Leslie Charteris
- The Asphalt Jungle (1949) by W. R. Burnett, adapted for film in 1950, 1958, 1963 and 1972
- novels by John Boland such as The League of Gentlemen (1958) and The Golden Fleece (1961)
- The Light of Day (1962) by Eric Ambler (filmed as Topkapi)
- the Modesty Blaise stories (beginning in 1963) of Peter O'Donnell
- the John Dortmunder series (beginning in 1970) and other novels by Donald E. Westlake
- Sledgehammer (1971) by Walter Wager
- A Tough One to Lose (1972) by Tony Kenrick
- The Taking of Pelham One Two Three (1973) by John Godey— a subway car is hijacked and held for ransom
- The Great Train Robbery (1975) by Michael Crichton
- Stealing Lillian (1975) by Tony Kenrick
- The Seven Day Soldiers (1976) by Tony Kenrick
- Faraday's Flowers (1978) — adapted as Shanghai Surprise
- Two Lucky People (1981) by Tony Kenrick
- Swindle (2008) By Gordon Korman
- Mistborn: The Final Empire (2006) By Brandon Sanderson
- The Lies of Locke Lamora (2006) by Scott Lynch
- Heist Society (2010) by Ally Carter
- Most books by Janet Evanovich
- Six of Crows (2015) by Leigh Bardugo

=== Television ===
- Now You See It, Now You Don't, a 1968 TV-movie about an art expert who is hired by an insurance company to protect a Rembrandt on loan from the Louvre and later hatches a scheme to steal it.
- Hustle, a British series created by Tony Jordan (2004–2012).
- Leverage, a TNT series created by Dean Devlin (2008–2012).
- Olsen-banden, a Danish comedy series.

== See also ==
- Canadian Caper
