= Séance on a Wet Afternoon (opera) =

2009 opera by Stephen Schwartz

- Opera by Stephen Schwartz
- Librettist: Stephen Schwartz
- Language: English
- Based on: Séance on a Wet Afternoon by Mark McShane Séance on a Wet Afternoon by Bryan Forbes (director and screenwriter)
- Premiere: 26 September 2009; Granada Theatre; Santa Barbara, California

Séance on a Wet Afternoon is an opera in two acts by Stephen Schwartz to his own libretto, based on the novel by Mark McShane and the screenplay by Bryan Forbes to the 1964 film of the same name. The work, Schwartz's first opera after a string of Broadway musicals (Godspell, Pippin, Wicked), premiered on 26 September 2009 at the Granada Theatre of Opera Santa Barbara which commissioned the work. The work lasts for about 2 hours 50 minutes.

== Performances ==
The work received its New York debut at the New York City Opera in April 2011, this time with an additional aria for the character of Myra in act 2. It was scheduled for an Australian premiere in 2012 at Opera Queensland; both companies were co-producers of the Santa Barbara staging. That project was however shelved in late 2011.

== Roles ==
Roles, voice types, premiere cast
Role	Voice type	Premiere cast, 26 September 2009 Conductor: Valery Ryvkin
Myra Foster	soprano	Lauren Flanigan
Bill Foster	baritone	Kim Josephson
Arthur Foster, their son		Aaron Refvem
Mrs Clayton	soprano	Hila Plitmann
Mr Clayton	tenor	John Kimberling
Adriana Clayton, their daughter		Kelsey Lee Smith
Inspector Watts	bass	Craig Hart
Mrs Wintry	mezzo-soprano	Jane Shaulis
Miss Rose	soprano	Caroline Worra
Mr Bennett /Irish Tenor	tenor	Michael Marcotte
Mr Cole	tenor	Benjamin Brecher
Policeman	tenor	Bray Wilkins
Chorus (Reporters)
Director		Scott Schwartz
Scenic designer		Heidi Ettinger
Lighting designer		David Lander
Costume designer		Alejo Vietti
Orchestrator		William D. Brohn/Stephen Schwartz
Copyist		Nathan Kelly, Don Oliver
Choreographer		Matt Williams
Executive producer		Michael Jackowitz

== Synopsis ==
While the opera is based on the film, there are significant differences, including a change from the film's detached atmosphere to a breezier, feel-good air, and a very different ending.
