= Allied Film Makers =

British film production company

Allied Film Partners
- Type: Private
- Industry: Film
- Founded: 1959
- Founder: Richard Attenborough; Bryan Forbes; Basil Dearden; Michael Relph; Jack Hawkins
- Defunct: 1964

Allied Film Makers was a shortlived British production company, formed in November 1959, which produced several films. Producer Sydney Box came up with the idea of forming a consortium of film-makers that would distribute the films they made. Box had to drop out of the company owing to illness, but four partnerships agreed to join: Basil Dearden and Michael Relph; Jack Hawkins; Richard Attenborough and Bryan Forbes; and Hawkins's brother. Guy Green later joined the Forbes-Attenborough group. Each group put up £5,000 and the Rank Organisation guaranteed distribution.

Several of Allied's films were financially and critically successful, including Whistle Down the Wind (1961). However, there were some financial failures, such as Life for Ruth (1962), and the company was unable to sustain its existence. The total negative cost of its films was £1,042,157, the distributors gross was £1,820,940, giving it a gross profit of £778,783, but the producers had to carry a loss of £142,934.

== Filmography ==
- The League of Gentlemen (1960)
- Man in the Moon (1960)
- Whistle Down the Wind (1961)
- Victim (1961)
- Life for Ruth (1962)
- Seance on a Wet Afternoon (1964)
