= Life for Ruth =

1962 film by Basil Dearden

- Theatrical poster
- Directed by: Basil Dearden
- Written by: Janet Green; James McCormick
- Produced by: Michael Relph
- Starring: Michael Craig; Patrick McGoohan; Janet Munro
- Cinematography: Otto Heller
- Edited by: John D. Guthridge
- Music by: William Alwyn
- Production companies: Allied Film Makers; Saracen Films Ltd
- Distributed by: Rank Film Distributors
- Release dates: 30 August 1962 (World Premiere, London); 1966 (US)
- Running time: 93 minutes
- Country: United Kingdom
- Language: English
- Budget: £126,800
- Box office: £53,788 (by 1971)

Life for Ruth (U.S. title: Walk in the Shadow) is a 1962 British drama film produced by Michael Relph directed by Basil Dearden and starring Michael Craig, Patrick McGoohan and Janet Munro.

== Plot ==
John Harris finds himself ostracized and placed on trial for allowing his daughter Ruth to die. His religious beliefs forbade him to give consent for a blood transfusion that would have saved her life. Doctor Brown is determined to seek justice for what he sees as the needless death of a young girl.

== Cast ==
- Michael Craig as John Harris
- Patrick McGoohan as Doctor Brown
- Janet Munro as Pat Harris
- Paul Rogers as Hart Jacobs
- Malcolm Keen as Mr. Harris Sr
- Megs Jenkins as Mrs. Gordon
- Michael Bryant as John's counsel
- Leslie Sands as Clyde
- Norman Wooland as counsel for the Crown
- John Barrie as Mr. Gordon
- Walter Hudd as Judge
- Michael Aldridge as Harvard
- Basil Dignam as Mapleton
- Maureen Pryor as Teddy's mother
- Kenneth J. Warren as Sergeant Finley
- Ellen McIntosh as Duty sister
- Frank Finlay as Teddy's father
- John Welsh as Marshall
- Maurice Colbourne as Vicar
- Freddy Ramsey as Teddy
- Lynn Taylor as Ruth
- Brian Wilde as newspaper photographer (uncredited)

== Production ==
The film was based on an original script by the husband and wife team of Janet Green and John McCormick, who had written Sapphire and Victim for Dearden and Relph. They wrote it in 1961 under the title God the Father then A Matter of Conscience.

Michael Craig had worked with Dearden and Relph on Sapphire. He says he was "surprised to be offered the film – playing a North country working class chap seemed against type – but I was delighted to do it."

Filming took place in Sunderland and Seaham Harbour, Co Durham.

== Reception ==
The film had its world premiere on 30 August 1962 at the Leicester Square Theatre in London's West End.

=== Box office ===
The film was a failure at the box office, contributing to the collapse of Allied Film Makers.

=== Critical ===
The Monthly Film Bulletin wrote: "The bleak Durham locations are photographed with a stylish sense of dramatic effect. But the weakness is that of most British problem pictures. Despite the explosive nature of the material and its sideshoots (such as, whether denying a man his religious right to "sacrifice" his child smacks of persecution) the film is completely uncommitted. Meticulously it gives free speech to every shade of opinion on the subject, while taking sides with none ...The film will offend no one, with the possible exception of street-corner sensation-mongers. Emotionally, however, the theme cannot really fail to be moving, and the torment of husband and wife is well expressed by Michael Craig and Janet Munro, though others in the cast wear their working-class air less convincingly."

The New York Times wrote of the film, "in avoiding blatant bias, mawkish sentimentality and theatrical flamboyance, it makes a statement that is dramatic, powerful and provocative."

Filmink felt "the film would've been better" had Munro "been given something more to do, such as McGoohan being in love with her or something," adding "Life for Ruth is actually very well made, but a kid dies in the first half hour – it's hard to get a film's momentum back after that."

== See also ==
- Jehovah's Witnesses and blood transfusions
