= Séance on a Wet Afternoon (upcoming film) =

American drama film

- Directed by: Tomas Alfredson
- Screenplay by: Jack Thorne
- Based on: Séance on a Wet Afternoon by Mark McShane
- Produced by: Rachel Weisz; Polly Stokes; Robyn Slovo; Ed Guiney; Andrew Lowe
- Starring: Rachel Weisz; Matthew Macfadyen; Joe Alwyn
- Cinematography: Marcell Rév
- Production companies: Element Pictures; Astral Projection; Film4
- Countries: United Kingdom; Ireland
- Language: English

Séance on a Wet Afternoon is an upcoming drama film directed by Tomas Alfredson, written by Jack Thorne, and starring Rachel Weisz and Matthew Macfadyen. It is based on the 1961 novel by Mark McShane, which had previously been adapted into a 1964 film of the same name starring Richard Attenborough.

== Cast ==
- Rachel Weisz as Myra
- Matthew Macfadyen as Billy
- Joe Alwyn
- Martin Rother as Hans

== Production ==
In January 2020 it was reported that Harry Bradbeer would direct an adaptation of the 1961 novel Séance on a Wet Afternoon by Mark McShane, previously adapted into the 1964 film of the same name, from a screenplay written by Jack Thorne. In October 2021, it was announced that Tomas Alfredson had replaced Bradbeer as director, with Rachel Weisz set to star. In May 2025, it was reported FilmNation had boarded the film ahead of the Cannes Film Market. The film would be produced by Robyn Slovo, Astral Projection's Weisz and Polly Stokes, and Ed Guiney and Andrew Lowe producing for Element Pictures. In February 2026, Matthew Macfadyen joined the cast, with production having officially begun. In March, Joe Alwyn joined the cast.
