= Phyllis Morris (actress) =

English dramatist, children's writer and actress (1894–1982)

Phyllis Morris (18 July 1894 – 9 February 1982) was an English dramatist, children's writer and actress. As an interwar actor "she was uncommonly astute in a sequence of character parts".

== Life ==
Phyllis Morris was born on 18 July 1894 in Walthamstow and educated at Cheltenham Ladies College. From 1947 to 1952, she worked as an actress in Hollywood, "playing there, as in Britain, any number of grim-featured harridans". She died on 9 February 1982 at Denville Hall, Northwood.

== Publications ==
=== Children's books ===
- Dandelion Clocks. London: Erskine Macdonald, 1917
- Peter's Pencil. London, 1920
- The Adventures of Willy and Nilly. London & New York, 1921
- " Spook Town" unpublished Illustrated by Helen Morris, her mother circa 1920

=== Plays ===
- The Rescue Party, 1926
- Made in Heaven, 1926
- Tinker, Tailor, 1928

== Theatre performances ==
- Service by Dodie Smith, 1932
- Music in the Air, 1933
- The Laughing Woman by Gordon Daviot, 1934
- Mrs Nobby Clark
- Call It a Day by Dodie Smith, 1935
- Worm's Eye View by R. F. Delderfield, 1945
- Murder Mistaken by Janet Green, 1952

== Filmography ==
- The Life of the Party (1934)
- Hyde Park (1934)
- Lord Edgeware Dies (1934)
- Night Journey (1938)
- The Adventures of Tartu (1943)
- That Forsyte Woman (1949)
- Mandy (1952)
- The Embezzler (1954) - (Mrs. Paulson:- uncredited)
