= Margaret Lacey =

British actress (1911–1988)

- Lacey as Mrs. Whistler in Diamonds are Forever 1971
- Born: Margaret Brackenbury Lacey; 26 October 1911; Chorlton-cum-Hardy
- Died: 4 October 1988 (aged 76); Llandudno
- Other name: Margaret Lacy
- Years active: 1957–1988

Margaret Brackenbury Lacey (26 October 1911 – 4 October 1988) was a British character actress and ballet teacher. She appeared in over 30 films between 1957 and 1985, usually playing a sweet old lady or motherly figure in minor roles.

== Early life ==
Margaret Lacey was born in Chorlton-cum-Hardy, near Manchester. She was baptised there, at the Church of St. Clement, in 1912, where her baptismal record gives her birthday as 26 October 1911, and her parents' names as Algernon Hearne Lacey and Florence Fanny. She was raised in Wales, and attended Miss Hammond's School in Colwyn Bay.

== Career ==
Margaret Lacey was magician Jasper Maskelyne's assistant in London, as a young woman in the 1930s.

Lacey appeared in over 30 films between 1957 and 1985, mostly playing a sweet old lady or motherly figure in minor roles. Some of her film credits include Bomb in the High Street (1963), Seance on a Wet Afternoon (1964), Island of Terror (1966), and Far from the Madding Crowd (1967), Black Beauty (1971), and Richard's Things (1980). She was a regular cast member for film directors Roy Boulting and John Schlesinger.

Lacey is also known for her minor role in the James Bond film Diamonds Are Forever (1971) in which she played Mrs. Whistler, a seemingly innocent Christian school teacher who smuggles diamonds in her bible for the henchmen Mr. Wint and Mr. Kidd.

On television, Lacey appeared in Dr Finlay's Casebook, The Saint, Coronation Street, Weavers Green, and Z-Cars in the 1960s. Her last credited appearances were in Magnum, P.I. and The Brothers McGregor in the 1980s. In 1988, Extra Special: Margaret Lacey, a documentary about Lacey, aired on British television.

For some years in the 1950s and 1960s she held regular dancing classes at the former Metropole Hotel in Colwyn Bay. She also organised concerts and choreographed entertainments at the Prince of Wales Theatre. She was a fixture in the Llandudno Victorian Extravaganza, playing Queen Victoria in the festivities.

== Personal life ==
Lacey lived in retirement in Wern Cottage, Rowen, Conwy. "Margaret Lacey was a rather eccentric lady," recalled one of her students in a local history. "Her outfits were colourful, and the layers did not always match. Her hair was worn in a rather dishevelled bun, but her bearing was always ladylike." She died in 1988, aged 76, in Llandudno.

== Selected filmography ==
- Brothers in Law (1957) - Helper
- Happy Is the Bride (1958) - Miss Dacres
- Carlton-Browne of the F.O. (1959) - Onlooker
- I'm All Right Jack (1959) - Empire Loyalist
- A French Mistress (1960) - Kitchen Maid
- Suspect (1960) - Prince's Secretary
- Dentist on the Job (1961) - Old Lady Contestant
- Bomb in the High Street (1961) - Woman at barrier
- Only Two Can Play (1962) - 1st Pianist (uncredited)
- Heavens Above! (1963) - Molly (uncredited)
- Billy Liar (1963) - Mrs. Matthieson (uncredited)
- Ladies Who Do (1963) - 3rd Charlady (uncredited)
- Séance on a Wet Afternoon (1964) - Woman at first Seance
- Rotten to the Core (1965) - Miss Rossiter
- Sky West and Crooked (1965) - Village Woman
- The Deadly Affair (1966) - Mrs. Bird (uncredited)
- Island of Terror (1966) - Old Woman
- The Family Way (1966) - Mrs. Harris
- Far from the Madding Crowd (1967) - Maryann Money
- There's a Girl in My Soup (1970) - Autograph Hunter
- Black Beauty (1971) - Anna Sewell
- Mr. Forbush and the Penguins (1971) - Auntie
- Diamonds Are Forever (1971) - Mrs. Whistler
- The Ruling Class (1972) - Midwife (uncredited)
- Bless This House (1972) - Vicar's Wife
- Smokey Joe's Revenge (1974) - Mrs. Williams
- Robin’s Nest (1976) - Old lady
- Yanks (1979) - Woman at Hotel
- Richard's Things (1980) - Miss Beale
- Secret Places (1984) - Mrs. Burgess
