= Janet Green (screenwriter) =

British screenwriter (1908–1993)

- Born: Ethel Victoria Green; 4 July 1908; Hitchin, Hertfordshire, England
- Died: 30 May 1993 (aged 84); Beaconsfield, Buckinghamshire, England
- Occupations: Screenwriter, playwright, actress
- Spouse: John McCormick

Janet Green (4 July 1908 – 30 May 1993) was a British screenwriter, playwright, and activist best known for the scripts for the BAFTA nominated films Sapphire and Victim, and for the play Murder Mistaken (made into the film Cast a Dark Shadow). She is also known for her use of filmmaking to fight against racism and homophobia, including challenging anti-homosexual British laws.

== Biography ==
Green was born in Hitchin, Hertfordshire on 4 July 1908. Originally an actress, on stage from 1931, she made appearances in the Aldwych Farces (1930–34) and was involved with entertainment for the armed forces in World War II. She gave up acting in 1945 to focus on writing.

Her second husband was the scriptwriter John McCormick, with whom she collaborated on several screenplays. They were both under contract to the Rank Organisation from 1956 to 1959. They collaborated on screenplays for three of the "social issue" films of producer Michael Relph and director Basil Dearden: Sapphire (dealing with racial tension in 1950s London), Victim (the first mainstream examination of homosexuality) and Life for Ruth (religious intolerance). They have been described as "three of the finest films in British cinema." Of Sapphire, the New York Post wrote in 1959, "Perhaps the screenplay writer, one Janet Green, deserves her own special notice for a picture that is so special."

Green and McCormick wrote John Ford's final film 7 Women (1966).

Green died in Beaconsfield on 30 May 1993, aged 84.

== Filmography ==
Year	Title	Notes
1950	The Clouded Yellow	original story and screenplay
1953	The Good Beginning	story and screenplay
1955	Cast a Dark Shadow	based on her play Murder Mistaken
1956	Lost	original screenplay
1956	The Long Arm	screenplay by Janet Green and Robert Barr
1956	Eyewitness	original story and screenplay
1958	The Gypsy and the Gentleman	screenplay by Janet Green based on novel by Nina Warner Hooke
1959	Sapphire	original screenplay - nominated for a BAFTA award for best British screenplay in 1960
1960	Midnight Lace	based on her 1958 play Matilda Shouted Fire
1961	Victim	screenplay by Janet Green and John McCormick - nominated for a BAFTA award for best British screenplay in 1962
1962	Life for Ruth	screenplay by Janet Green and John McCormick
1966	7 Women	screenplay by Janet Green and John McCormick

== Theatre ==
Year	Title	Notes
1952	Murder Mistaken	produced in the UK and the USA / adapted for television and for film (as Cast a Dark Shadow)
1958	Matilda Shouted Fire	adapted for film as Midnight Lace
