= John Barrie (actor) =

English actor (1917–1980)

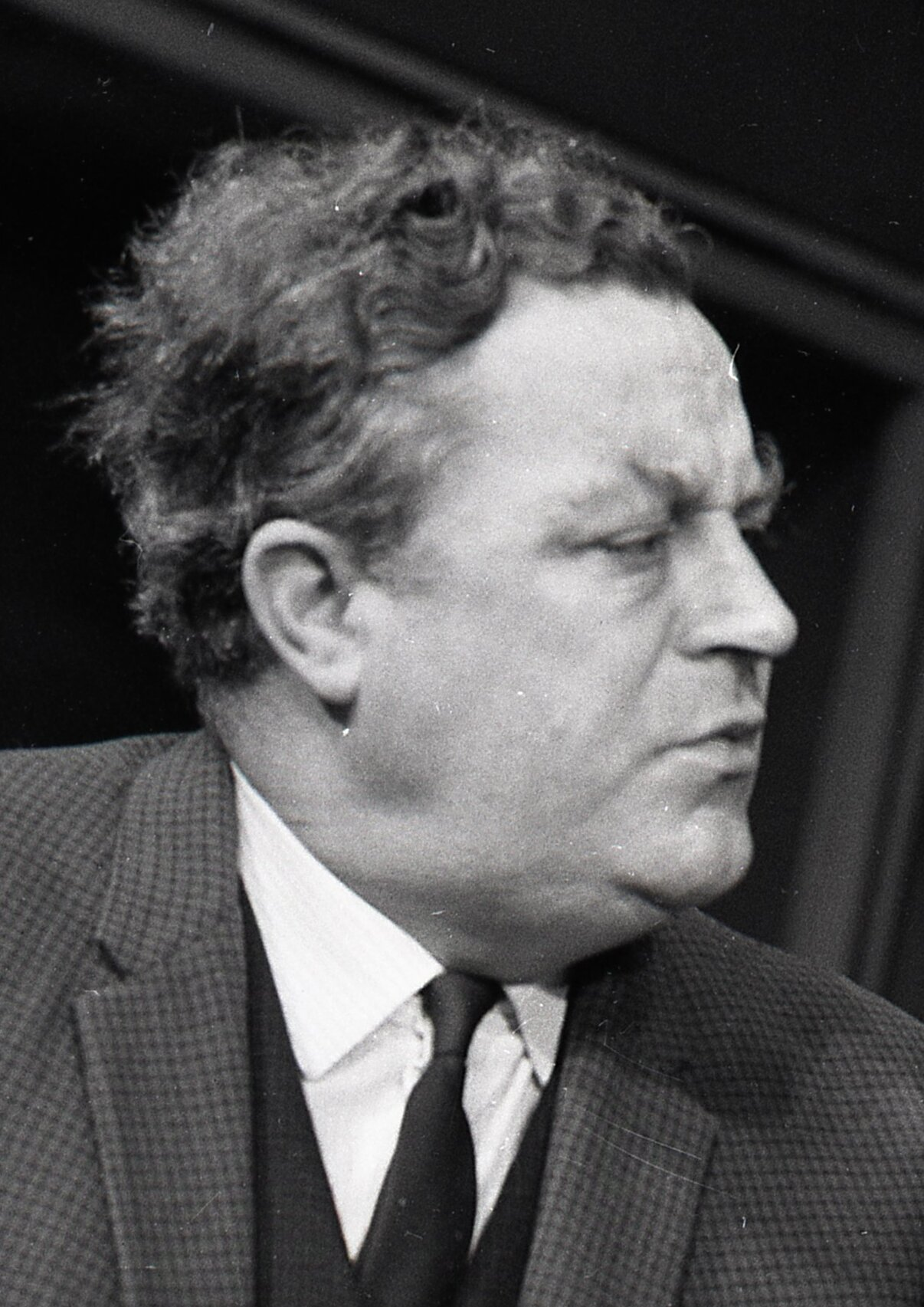
- Barrie in 1967
- Born: John Barrie Smith; 6 May 1917; New Brighton, Cheshire, England
- Died: 24 March 1980 (aged 62); York, North Yorkshire, England
- Occupation: Actor
- Years active: 1954–1973

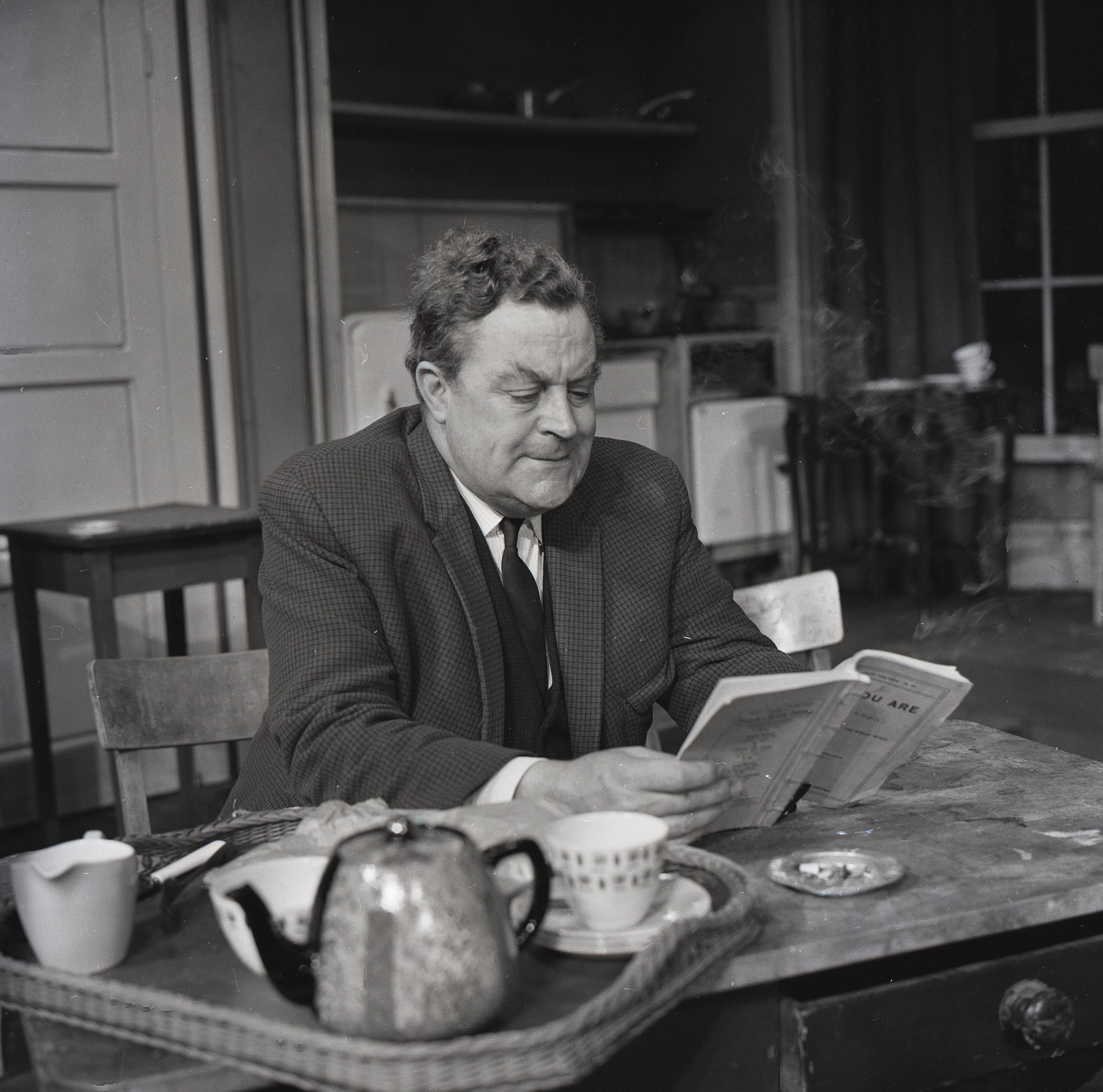
John Barrie learning the lines for 'As You Are', York Theatre royal 1967

John Barrie Smith (6 May 1917 – 24 March 1980) was an English actor who appeared in a number of television shows and films. He became well known for playing the title character on the police series Sergeant Cork from 1963–1968 and playing Detective Inspector Hudson on Z-Cars from 1967–1968. He was born in New Brighton, Cheshire in 1917 and made his screen debut in the 1954 film Yankee Pasha. He retired from acting in the 1970s, and latterly owned a number of grocery shops around York.

== Theatre work and early career ==
Before achieving fame in film and television, John Barrie established himself as a talented stage actor in the British theatre scene. In the late 1940s and early 1950s, he performed with various repertory companies, including the Old Vic Theatre Company and the Birmingham Repertory Theatre. One of his earliest notable stage roles was as Horatio in a 1949 production of Hamlet at the Old Vic, where his commanding presence and clear delivery earned him praise from critics. This experience honed his acting skills and paved the way for his transition to screen work.

Barrie’s theatre career also included a stint with the Royal Shakespeare Company (RSC) in 1952, where he appeared in productions such as The Merchant of Venice as Antonio and Macbeth as Banquo. His work with the RSC showcased his versatility, allowing him to tackle both classical and contemporary roles. Theatre critics of the time commended his ability to bring depth to supporting characters, a skill that later translated effectively to his television and film performances. Although he shifted focus to screen acting by the mid-1950s, Barrie occasionally returned to the stage, with his final recorded theatre appearance being a 1965 production of The Crucible in York, where he played Deputy Governor Danforth.

== Selected filmography ==
- Victim (1961) - Det.Inspector Harris
- Life for Ruth (1962) - Mr. Gordon
- The Wild and the Willing (1962) - Mr. Corbett
- Lancelot and Guinevere (1963) - Sir Bedivere
- The Oblong Box (1969) - Supt. Sloane
- The File of the Golden Goose (1969) - Franklin
- Patton (1970) - Air Vice-Marshal Sir Arthur Coningham
- Song of Norway (1970) - Mr. Hagerup

== Selected television appearances ==
- ITV Play of the Week (1958–1967) - Frank Jarrett / Henry Hobson / James Kennion / Edward Timbrell
- Armchair Theatre (1958–1961) - Mr. Chard / Chick / Gracey
- Emergency Ward 10 (1959–1960) - R.S.O. Miller / Sgt. Woolley
- Deadline Midnight (1961) - McLaren
- Coronation Street (1961–1972) - Jimmy Frazer / Lenny Phillips
- Z-Cars (1962–1968) - Det. Chief Insp. Hudson / Porter / Stephen Peake
- The Saint (1963-1966) - Coleman / Elliot Vascoe
- Sergeant Cork (1963–1968) - Sergeant Cork
- The Sullavan Brothers (1965) - P.C. Turner
- The Doctors (1969–1971) - Dr. John Somers

== List of work and genres ==
  - Notable works and genre John Barrie was featured mostly in crime dramas and played the authoritative figure in the police-related characters. His films also belonged to the genre of war films and historical dramas. “Patton”, a war film, “Victim”, a film based on a thriller, “Coronation Street", a soap opera; and "Sergeant Cork", was a drama based on criminal proceedings and crime drama.
  - Films “Victim", "Life for Ruth", "The Wild and the Willing", "Lancelot and Guinevere", "The Oblong Box" and "Song of Norway", with “Patton”, were a few of the key films of John Barrie. The successful career of Barrie encompassed a versatile and multi-talented nature of portrayals of his characters.
  - Major TV shows The three major soap operas undertaken by John Barrie were “Coronation Street” from 1961 to 1972, "Z-Cars", from 1962 to 1968, and "The Doctors" from 1969 to 1971. Another mini-series of Barrie was “The Brothers Karamazov”, where he played Fyodor Karamazov and it lasted for 4 episodes.

== Later life and death ==
After retiring from acting in the early 1970s, John Barrie settled in York, England, where he focused on his family and managing a small chain of grocery shops. He became an active member of the local community, often participating in charitable events and supporting initiatives for veterans, reflecting his own wartime service in the Royal Artillery during the Second World War. Barrie was known for his quiet demeanour and dedication to his family, frequently spending time with his children and grandchildren in his later years.

John Barrie died on 24 March 1980 at the age of 62 in York, following a brief illness attributed to a heart condition. His death was reported in several British newspapers, with The Daily Telegraph noting his contributions to television and film in an obituary. He was survived by his wife, Margaret, their two children, Peter and Susan, and four grandchildren. Barrie's funeral was held at York Minster, attended by family, friends, and a few former colleagues from the entertainment industry. His legacy endures through his memorable performances and the respect he earned from peers and fans alike.
