= Gerry Turpin =

English cinematographer

Gerald Leslie Turpin (1 September 1925, Wandsworth, London – 16 September 1997, North Cotswold, Gloucestershire) was an English cinematographer.

== Biography ==
Turpin began his career in 1945 at Ealing Studios as a camera assistant to Douglas Slocombe and Stanley Pavey. From 1953, he worked as a camera operator, and worked with Pavey, Gordon Dines, Desmond Dickinson, Otto Heller, Gilbert Taylor, Reginald H. Wyer and Harry Waxman. He made his first film as director of photography, The Queen's Guards (1961) with director Michael Powell.

For his first collaboration with Bryan Forbes, Seance on a Wet Afternoon (1964), he received a nomination at the British Academy Film Awards in 1965. For a later film with Forbes, The Whisperers (1967), he received a BAFTA Award for Best Cinematography, and for Oh! What a Lovely War (1969), Richard Attenborough's directorial debut, he received the 1969 BSC Best Cinematography Award and his second BAFTA.

On Attenborough's, Young Winston (1972), Turpin used a camera lens mounted device he had developed called ColorFlex which represented an alternative to conventional pre-exposure (flashing) of negative film in the lab. The pre-exposure of the film material means dark areas of the image are brightened.

From 1973, Turpin developed his ColorFlex system into a comprehensive system called Lightflex which was used by cameramen such as Oswald Morris (The Wiz, 1978), Freddie Francis (Dune, 1984), Sven Nykvist (Swann in Love, 1984), Adam Greenberg (La Bamba, 1987) and Jost Vacano (Total Recall, 1990). At the 56th Academy Awards in 1984, Turpin received a technical Oscar (Scientific and Engineering Award) for Flex.

== Filmography ==
=== As cinematographer ===
- The Queen's Guards (1961)
- Séance on a Wet Afternoon (1964) (photographed by)
- The Wrong Box (1966) (photographed by)
- Dutchman (1967)
- The Whisperers (1967) (photographed by)
- The Bobo (1967) (photographed by)
- Deadfall (1968)
- Diamonds for Breakfast (1968)
- Oh! What a Lovely War (1969)
- Hoffman (1970) (director of photography)
- The Man Who Had Power Over Women (1970)
- I Want What I Want (1972)
- What Became of Jack and Jill? (1972)
- Young Winston (1972) (director of photography)
- The Last of Sheila (1973) (director of photography)
- The Doctor and the Devils (1985)

==== Television ====
- The Human Jungle (1 episode, 1964)
  - "The Man Who Fell Apart" (1964)
- The Avengers (5 episodes, 1965)
  - "Death at Bargain Prices" (1965)
  - "The Master Minds" (1965)
  - "The Murder Market" (1965)
  - "Dial a Deadly Number" (1965)
  - "Too Many Christmas Trees" (1965)
