= Murder Mistaken =

1952 play by Janet Green

- Written by: Janet Green
- Original language: English
- Genre: Thriller
- Setting: Kent, present day

Premiere
- Date premiered: 22 September 1952
- Place premiered: Prince of Wales Theatre, Cardiff

Murder Mistaken is a 1952 thriller play by the British author Janet Green. It first appeared at the Prince of Wales Theatre in Cardiff under the title Teddy Bare's Picnic. It then transferred to London's West End under its new title first at the Ambassadors Theatre and then at the Vaudeville Theatre. It's West End run lasted 156 performances between 4 November 1952 and 28 March 1953. The West End cast included Derek Farr, Anthony Marlowe, Phyllis Morris, Iris Hoey, Brenda de Banzie, Patricia Burke and Rosalie Crutchley. It appeared on Broadway under the alternative title Gently Does It, lasting for thirty seven performances at the Playhouse Theatre. Green wrote a novelisation in 1953 with Leonard Gribble.

== Film adaptation ==
In 1955 it was adapted into the film noir Cast a Dark Shadow directed by Lewis Gilbert and starring Dirk Bogarde, Margaret Lockwood and Kay Walsh.

== Bibliography ==
- Goble, Alan. The Complete Index to Literary Sources in Film. Walter de Gruyter, 1999.
- Kabatchnik, Amnon. Blood on the Stage, 1950-1975: Milestone Plays of Crime, Mystery, and Detection. Scarecrow Press, 2011.
- Wearing, J.P. The London Stage 1950–1959: A Calendar of Productions, Performers, and Personnel. Rowman & Littlefield, 2014.
