= Séance on a Wet Afternoon =

1964 British film by Bryan Forbes

- Theatrical poster
- Directed by: Bryan Forbes
- Screenplay by: Bryan Forbes
- Based on: Séance on a Wet Afternoon; 1961 novel by Mark McShane
- Produced by: Richard Attenborough; Bryan Forbes
- Starring: Kim Stanley; Richard Attenborough
- Cinematography: Gerry Turpin
- Edited by: Derek York
- Music by: John Barry
- Production company: Allied Film Makers
- Distributed by: Rank Organisation (UK); Artixo Productions (US)
- Release dates: 20 June 1964 (UK); 5 November 1964 (US)
- Running time: 115 minutes
- Country: United Kingdom
- Language: English
- Budget: £139,000
- Box office: £195,688 (by 1971)

Séance on a Wet Afternoon is a 1964 British crime thriller film, directed by Bryan Forbes, and starring Kim Stanley, Richard Attenborough, Nanette Newman, Mark Eden and Patrick Magee. Based on the 1961 novel by Mark McShane, the film follows Myra Savage, a mentally unstable medium who convinces her husband Billy to kidnap Amanda Clayton, a child, so she can help the police solve the crime and achieve renown for her abilities. Stanley was nominated for the Academy Award for Best Actress for her role in the film.

== Plot ==
Myra Savage is a medium who holds séances in her home. Her husband Billy, unable to work because of asthma and cowed by Myra's domineering personality, assists in her séances. Myra's life and psychic work are dominated by her relationship with the spirit of her son Arthur, who died at birth.

At Myra's insistence, Billy kidnaps Amanda, the young daughter of a wealthy couple, Mr and Mrs Charles Clayton, confining her in a room in the Savage home, whilst Myra impersonates a nurse to deceive the girl into believing she is hospitalised. Myra insists she is "borrowing" Amanda to demonstrate her psychic abilities to the police in helping them find her. Although they ask for a £25,000 ransom, they plan to return the money with Amanda after Myra has become famous for helping find her. Myra visits the Claytons, stating that she is a professional medium and claiming that she had a dream involving their daughter Amanda; Clayton is dismissive but his wife believes that Myra may know something. Mrs Clayton then comes to one of Myra's seances.

After Billy hides Amanda, the police come to the house to investigate. Billy collects the ransom money, burying it in their garden before taking Amanda back to their house, but she has a high temperature and Billy wants to get a doctor, which Myra violently disagrees with. Myra's plan goes awry as her unsteady mental health begins to fray. Believing that her dead son Arthur wants Amanda to be with him, she tells Billy to kill her; he wants to refuse, realising that his wife is completely unhinged, but he seems to lack the will power to resist her. He takes Amanda into the woods and places her under a tree; it is not clear if she is dead or just sedated.

When the police ask Myra to conduct a séance to help them find the missing Amanda – as she had hoped they would – she breaks down during the séance and reveals, as if in a psychic trance, what she and Billy have done. As the trance continues, she senses that Amanda was not killed. Billy tells the police where he hid the ransom money and reveals that he left Amanda unconscious where she would be found by scouts who were camping nearby, which the police already know, confirming that she is all right.

== Cast ==
- Kim Stanley as Myra
- Margaret Lacey as woman at first séance
- Marie Burke as woman at first séance
- Maria Kazan as woman at first séance
- Lionel Gamlin as man at seances
- Marion Spencer as Mrs Wintry
- Richard Attenborough as Bill
- Godfrey James as Mrs Clayton's chauffeur
- Judith Donner as Amanda
- Ronald Hines as policeman outside Clayton's
- Hajni Biro as maid at Clayton's
- Mark Eden as Mr Clayton
- Nanette Newman as Mrs Clayton
- Diana Lambert as Mr Clayton's secretary
- Frank Singuineau as bus conductor
- Gerald Sim as Beedle
- Stanley Morgan as man in trilby
- Margaret McGrath as woman at second séance
- Michael Lees as plain clothes policeman
- Patrick Magee as Walsh

== Original novel ==
The film was based on the novel Seance on a Wet Afternoon by Australian author Mark McShane that was published in 1961. The Montreal Star wrote "this is exciting reading."

== Production ==
=== Development ===
The movie was made by Beaver Productions, the company established by Bryan Forbes and Richard Attenborough. Forbes claimed he wrote the script in seven days in December 1962, immediately after he finished a rewrite of Of Human Bondage. He said he did it as "an act of penance more than anything else for I had a guilty conscience at having neglected Beaver Films for so long".

=== Casting ===
According to Jon Krampner's biography Female Brando: The Legend of Kim Stanley, Bryan Forbes and Richard Attenborough initially had encountered difficulty in casting the role of Myra Savage. Deborah Kerr and Simone Signoret originally were approached for the part, but both actresses turned down the role.

Forbes confirmed in his memoirs Signoret turned down the role because it involved the kidnapping of a child, adding "For a variety of reasons every other leading actress we thought of was unavailable and it seemed highly probable that we would have to shelve the whole project." Forbes rewrote the script to focus on a gay couple and offered the roles to Alec Guinness and Tom Courtenay. Both men turned down the part.

Forbes then rewrote the script on the advice of Ken Taylor, who suggested he go back to making the lead a female, who had a child who died. Forbes did this.

Forbes and Attenborough then contacted Kim Stanley, an American theatre and television actress whose previous film work was limited to starring in the 1958 feature The Goddess and providing the uncredited opening and closing narration for the 1962 adaptation of To Kill a Mockingbird. Attenborough later was quoted as stating that Stanley was the best choice, noting that the "complexity of dramatic impression vital to the credibility of Myra was hard to find. Also an intellectual ability to follow and understand the character. I didn’t believe Simone (Signoret) could convey, as Kim did, the otherworldliness which this woman inhabited in her private fantasies."

=== Shooting ===
The film was shot at Pinewood Studios and at various locations around London including Trafalgar Square, Wimbledon, several London Underground stations and the derelict Staines Greyhound Stadium. The film's sets were designed by the art director Ray Simm.

Attenborough called Kim Stanley "wonderful but complicated."

Forbes called Stanley "a brilliant actress, instinctive and inventive, but her own worst enemy. A delightful person, but haunted by self-doubt. No temperament whatsoever in the ordinary boring theatrical sense, but often maddening to work with." He added "It was often an agonizingly difficult film to make, though never an unhappy one."

== Reception ==
=== Critical ===
The Monthly Film Bulletin wrote:

If one says that the best things about Seance on a Wet Afternoon are the performances of Kim Stanley and Richard Attenborough and Bryan Forbes' script, this is not to decry Forbes' direction. In fact he does an excellent job, and no doubt the perfectly modulated acting (no hysteria, no Look It's My Mad Scene) is largely due to his sympathetic handling of the actors: but there are flaws which indicate an uncertainty of level. ... The atmosphere is beautifully furthered by the décor – the hideously oppressive living-room, the ancient gramophone scratchily playing a haunting Mendelssohn song, the glaring whiteness of the bedroom disguised as a hospital, the polished gloom of the seance chamber, the discreetly overgrown garden. ... Still, it isn't often that the British cinema offers a thriller which is so consistently intelligent and exciting; which contains one genuinely superb performance (Kim Stanley) likely to figure in many a ten-best list, and another (Attenborough) almost as good; and which provides dialogue which unerringly illuminates the dangerous areas between private fantasy and public madness.

London's Daily Express called the film "superbly atmospheric", and The Sunday Telegraph dubbed it "compassionate, intelligent and absorbing."

The New York Herald Tribune called Séance on a Wet Afternoon "the perfect psychological suspense thriller and a flawless film to boot", and The New York Times stated "it isn’t often you see a melodrama that sends you forth with a lump in your throat, as well as a set of muscles weary from being tense for nigh two hours."

=== Box office ===
The film was a commercial failure, and its losses – along with those of Life for Ruth (1962) – caused the demise of the Allied Film Makers company.

=== Awards and nominations ===
Award	Category	Nominee(s)	Result
Academy Awards	Best Actress	Kim Stanley	Nominated
British Academy Film Awards	Best Foreign Actress	Kim Stanley	Nominated
British Academy Film Awards	Best British Actor	Richard Attenborough (also for Guns at Batasi)	Won
British Academy Film Awards	Best British Screenplay	Bryan Forbes	Nominated
British Academy Film Awards	Best British Cinematography – Black and White	Gerry Turpin	Nominated
Edgar Allan Poe Awards	Best Foreign Film	Bryan Forbes	Won
Laurel Awards	Top Female Dramatic Performance	Kim Stanley	Nominated
National Board of Review Awards	Top Ten Films		10th Place
National Board of Review Awards	Best Actress	Kim Stanley	Won
New York Film Critics Circle Awards	Best Actress	Kim Stanley	Won
San Sebastián International Film Festival	Best Actor	Richard Attenborough	Won (Note: Tied with Maurice Biraud for The Adventures of Salavin.)
Writers' Guild of Great Britain Awards	Best British Dramatic Screenplay	Bryan Forbes	Won

== Remakes ==
Séance on a Wet Afternoon was remade in 2000 as the Japanese horror film Seance (Japanese: 降霊, Kōrei), directed by Kiyoshi Kurosawa. An opera of the same name based on the film, created by Broadway composer Stephen Schwartz, had its world premiere on 26 September 2009, at the Granada Theater at Opera Santa Barbara in California.

In February of 2026 a new remake was announced to be directed by Tomas Alfredson, based on a script by Jack Thorne starring Matthew Macfadyen and Rachel Weisz.

== Bibliography ==
- Paul Wells, Alan Burton & Tim O'Sullivan. Liberal Directions: Basil Dearden and Postwar British Film Culture. Flicks Books, 1997.
- Forbes, Bryan (1974). Notes for a life. Collins. p. 261.
