= Frank Hopkins (cricketer) =

English cricketer

Personal information
- Full name: Frank Jesse Hopkins
- Born: 30 June 1875; Kings Norton, Worcestershire, England
- Died: 15 January 1930 (aged 54); Southampton, Hampshire, England
- Batting: Left-handed
- Bowling: Left-arm medium

Domestic team information
- Years: Team
- 1898–1903: Warwickshire
- 1906–1911: Hampshire

Career statistics
| Competition | First-class |
|---|---|
| Matches | 14 |
| Runs scored | 44 |
| Batting average | 2.75 |
| 100s/50s | –/– |
| Top score | 13 |
| Balls bowled | 1,562 |
| Wickets | 29 |
| Bowling average | 32.41 |
| 5 wickets in innings | 1 |
| 10 wickets in match | – |
| Best bowling | 5/10 |
| Catches/stumpings | 3/– |
- Source: Cricinfo, 1 February 2010

Frank Jesse Hopkins (30 June 1875 – 15 January 1930) was an English first-class cricketer and groundskeeper.

Hopkins was born in June 1875 at Kings Norton, Worcestershire. He made his debut in first-class cricket for Warwickshire against Lancashire at Liverpool in the 1898 County Championship. His initial matches aroused suspicion around his bowling action, with the Lancashire Evening Post reporting that his deliveries were regarded as suspicious on debut. The Leeds Mercury similarly noted this, reporting how other players realised that his bowling action was open to serious question. This suspicion culminated in him being called for throwing by umpire Valentine Titchmarsh in his sixth match of 1898 against Kent at Tonbridge. Soon after, he was dropped from the team and played only three further matches for Warwickshire in 1898. The nine matches he did play in saw Hopkins take 24 wickets average of 29.91, with best figures of 5 for 10 against Kent in his second match. Hopkins did not play for Warwickshire in 1899, featuring only twice more against Essex in the 1900 County Championship and Surrey in the 1903 County Championship.

In 1904, he became engaged as head groundsman at the County Ground in Southampton. Whilst engaged at Southampton, he made two appearances in first-class cricket for Hampshire against Surrey in the 1906 County Championship, and Yorkshire in the 1911 County Championship. During his time at Hampshire, he became one of the most renowned groundsmen in the country, and prior to the First World War, he turned down the opportunity to become the head groundsman at Lord's. During the war, he helped to organise exhibition matches against both British and overseas armed forces sides to raise money for the Red Cross Fund. He celebrated 18 years service with Hampshire in 1922, for which he was recognised with a testimonial during a home match at Southampton against Nottinghamshire. In later life, Hopkins suffered from ill-health, spending part of 1923 recovering from a serious illness. He briefly coached Hampshire in 1925, doing so until the appointment of Robert Relf later that year. Hopkins died at Southampton in January 1930, following a six-week illness. He was laid to rest at Hollybrook Cemetery, with his funeral attended by many cricketers.

Sporting positions
| Preceded by None | Hampshire cricket coach 1925 | Succeeded by Robert Relf |
