= Ernest Relf =

English cricketer

Ernest Herbert Relf (19 November 1888 – 27 July 1918) was an English cricketer active from 1912 to 1914 who played for Sussex. He was born in Sandhurst, Berkshire and died in Leicester. He appeared in twelve first-class matches as a righthanded batsman who bowled right arm medium pace. He scored 232 runs with a highest score of 36 and took eight wickets with a best performance of two for 24. He was the younger brother of Albert Relf (England and Sussex) and Robert Relf (Sussex). Relf died on active service as a gunner in the Royal Garrison Artillery during the First World War.
