= Sergeant Cork =

British TV drama series (1963–1968)

- Genre: Detective; Period drama
- Created by: Ted Willis
- Starring: John Barrie; William Gaunt; Charles Morgan; Freddie Fowler; Edward Ogden; Arnold Diamond; John Richmond; Barry Raymond; Peter Sallis; Donald Morley
- Country of origin: United Kingdom
- Original language: English
- No. of series: 6
- No. of episodes: 66

Production
- Producer: Jack Williams
- Running time: 50 minutes
- Production company: ATV

Original release
- Network: ITV
- Release: 1963 – 1968

Sergeant Cork is a British detective television series that aired between 1963 and 1968 on ITV. It was a police procedural show that followed the efforts of two police officers and their battle against crime in Victorian London. In all 66 hour-long episodes were aired during the five-year run, although the last episode was not broadcast until January 1968, 16 months after the others. Journalist Tom Sutcliffe has credited it as a first example of the use of the Victorian-era policeman in a television crime series.

A 1969 review in The Age opined that rather than suspense, the strengths of the series were its "[e]xcellent period settings and wonderfully thick pea-soupers" which "add up to splendid evocative stuff", as well as the performance of star John Barrie.

At no time during the whole series is Sergeant Cork's first name given.

== Cast ==
- John Barrie as Sergeant Cork
- William Gaunt as Robert 'Bob' Marriott
- Charles Morgan as Superintendent Charlie Rodway
- Freddie Fowler as Chalky White
- Edward Ogden as Sergeant Gardner
- Arnold Diamond as Detective Inspector Joseph Bird
- John Richmond as Superintendent Billy Nelson
- Barry Raymond as PC Evans
- A. J. Brown as Assistant Commissioner John Thor
- Joyce Carey as Mrs Maud Marriott

Notable guest stars included Carmen Silvera, Alan Haines and Peter Sallis.

== Home media ==
Network has released the entire series on Region 2, PAL DVD in the UK. The second series was an exclusive two-disc set on their website which has since been re-released on 3 September 2012. The third series was a four-disc set and was available through the Network website. Series 4 became available from both the Network website and other retailers on 6 August 2012. Series 5 was released on 19 November 2012, and Series 6 on 18 March 2013. A 19 disc set of the complete series was released in 2018.
