= Victim (1961 film) =

British film by Basil Dearden

- Original 1961 British quad poster
- Directed by: Basil Dearden
- Written by: Janet Green; John McCormick
- Produced by: Michael Relph
- Starring: Dirk Bogarde; Sylvia Syms; Dennis Price
- Cinematography: Otto Heller
- Edited by: John D. Guthridge
- Music by: Philip Green
- Production company: Allied Film Makers
- Distributed by: Rank Film Distributors
- Release date: 31 August 1961
- Running time: 96 minutes
- Country: United Kingdom
- Language: English
- Budget: £153,756

Victim is a 1961 British neo-noir suspense film directed by Basil Dearden and starring Dirk Bogarde and Sylvia Syms. The first British film to explicitly name homosexuality and deal with it sympathetically, it premiered in the UK on 31 August 1961 and in the US the following February.

On its release in the United Kingdom, the film proved highly controversial to the British Board of Film Censors, and in the US it was refused a seal of approval from the American Motion Picture Production Code. Despite this, it received acclaim and is now regarded as a British classic, and it has been credited with liberalising attitudes towards homosexuality in Great Britain.

== Plot ==
Melville Farr is a successful barrister with a thriving London practice. He is on course to become a Queen's Counsel, and people are already talking of him being appointed a judge. One day, Farr receives a call from Jack "Boy" Barrett, a young working-class gay man with whom he previously had a romantic friendship. Farr, who is apparently happily married to Laura, assumes Barrett wants to blackmail him about their relationship, so he does not listen and tells Barrett not to call him again. In reality, however, Barrett has been trying to reach Farr to appeal for help, because he has fallen prey to blackmailers who have a picture of Farr and Barrett in a vehicle together. The image is somewhat compromising, as Barrett is crying and Farr's arm is around him, so Barrett stole £2,300 (£44,700 today) from his employers to pay the blackmail, but he has been found out and now the police are pursuing him, so he needs financial assistance to flee the country. After managing to borrow £20 from a friend, Barrett is picked up by the police, who quickly deduce that he is being blackmailed, and even make a connection to Farr when they recover a scrapbook of articles that Barrett was unable to successfully destroy before his capture. Knowing it will only be a matter of time before he is forced to reveal the details of the blackmail scheme and Farr's role, Barrett hangs himself in a police cell.

After learning the truth about how Barrett had tried to protect him, Farr decides to take on the blackmail ring, recruiting Eddy, Barrett's friend and roommate, to identify others whom the blackmailers may be targeting. Eddy directs Farr to Henry, a hairdresser, but Henry refuses to identify his tormentors to Farr. When one of the blackmailers, a young man who goes by the name of "Sandy", visits Henry's salon and begins to destroy it, Henry suffers a heart attack. Just before dying, he calls Farr's house and leaves a mumbled message that names another victim of the blackmailers.

Following up on the lead, Farr contacts a prominent stage actor named Calloway, but Calloway also refuses to help, as he would prefer to continue paying and keep his sexuality secret. Laura finds out about Barrett's suicide and confronts her husband. After a heated argument, during which Farr maintains that he has kept the promise he made when they married that he would no longer indulge his homosexual attraction, Laura decides that Farr has betrayed that promise by having a relationship with Barrett, even if it was not physical, and openly begins to consider leaving him.

Eddy identifies a car salesman named Phip as another victim of the blackmailers, and Farr gets Phip to let him go to an appointment with Sandy by offering to buy back the letters that are being used to blackmail Phip. Farr tells Sandy that he wants Phip's letters and the negatives of the pictures of him and Barrett. Sandy consults with his partner, and then, to put pressure on Farr, vandalises Farr's Chiswick home by painting "FARR IS QUEER" on the garage door.

Undeterred, Farr works with the police to capture the blackmailers after they pick up his money for the letters and negatives, and they discover that Sandy was working with Miss Benham, who wants to make homosexuals "pay for their filthy blasphemy", and that the duo started getting information about their marks from Phip once he could no longer afford to keep paying them. Farr promises to testify at the blackmailers' trial, even though the ensuing press coverage will certainly destroy his career and reputation, as he hopes his involvement will help draw attention to the problems with the existing laws against homosexuality.

Surprised to find Laura still at home, Farr tells her to leave town before the ugliness of the trial. When she asks if she should return afterward, he says he will welcome her back, as he will "need [her] so desperately." She responds that "need" is "a bigger word than 'love'" and says she thinks she has the strength to stand by him. After Laura leaves, Farr burns a print of the suggestive photograph of him and Barrett.

== Cast ==
- Dirk Bogarde as Melville "Mel" Farr
- Sylvia Syms as Laura Farr (née Hankin)
- Dennis Price as "Tiny" Calloway, a prominent stage actor
- Anthony Nicholls as Lord Charles "Teddy" Fullbrook
- Peter Copley as Paul Mandrake, a photographer
- Norman Bird as Harold Doe, a bookseller
- Peter McEnery as Jack "Boy" Barrett
- Donald Churchill as Eddy Stone, Barrett's friend and roommate
- Derren Nesbitt as "Sandy Youth", a blackmailer
- John Barrie as Detective Inspector Harris
- John Cairney as Police Sergeant Bridie
- Alan MacNaughtan as Scott Hankin, Laura's brother
- Nigel Stock as Phip Mortimer, a car salesman
- Frank Pettitt as Fred, the barman at The Chequers
- Mavis Villiers as Madge, a middle-aged model
- Charles Lloyd-Pack as Henry, a hairdresser
- Hilton Edwards as P.H., a blind conman
- David Evans as Mickey, P.H.'s associate
- Noel Howlett as William Patterson, Farr's assistant
- Margaret Diamond as Miss Benham, Doe's employee
- Alan Howard as Frank Jefferies, an old friend of Barrett
- Dawn Beret as Sylvie Jefferies, Frank's wife

Uncredited

- Nora Gordon as Mrs. Brooks, Farr's housekeeper
- John Boxer as the policeman who visits Barrett in his cell
- Frank Thornton as George, Henry's assistant
- John Bennett as Police Sergeant Hoey, the undercover detective
- Victor Brooks as one of the detectives who arrests P.H. and Mickey

== Production ==
=== Background ===
Homosexual acts between males were illegal in England and Wales until the Sexual Offences Act 1967, which implemented the recommendations of the Wolfenden report published a decade earlier. The fact that willing participants in consensual homosexual acts could be prosecuted made them vulnerable to entrapment, and the criminalisation of homosexuality was known as the "blackmailer's charter". Homosexuals were prosecuted and tabloid newspapers covered the court proceedings. By 1960, however, the police demonstrated little enthusiasm for prosecuting those engaged in homosexual activity. There was an inclination to "turn a blind eye" to homosexuality, because there was a feeling that the legal code violated basic liberties. However, public opprobrium, even in the absence of criminal prosecution, continued to require homosexuals to keep their identity secret and made them vulnerable to blackmail. The film treats homosexuality in a non-sensationalised manner.

The scriptwriter Janet Green had previously collaborated with Basil Dearden on a British "social problem" film, Sapphire (1959), which dealt with racism against Afro-Caribbean immigrants to the United Kingdom in the late 1950s. After reading the Wolfenden report, and knowing of several high-profile prosecutions of gay men, Green became a keen supporter of homosexual law reform. She wrote the screenplay with her husband John McCormick. Despite its then controversial subject, the film was, in other respects, quite conventional in being quite chaste. Farr has not had sex with Barrett, nor with the man he loved at university. The audience is allowed just one glimpse of the photo of Farr and Barrett (seen from the reverse of the print), and the screenplay underscores the fact that only Barrett's tears suggest anything untoward, along with the breaking of social taboos in that they are different classes and far apart in age. In addition, the film promises that Farr and Laura will remain united and faithful to one another. As Pauline Kael wrote:

The hero of the film is a man who has never given way to his homosexual impulses; he has fought them–that's part of his heroism. Maybe that's why he seems such a stuffy stock figure of a hero... The dreadful irony involved is that Dirk Bogarde looks so pained, so anguished from the self-sacrifice of repressing his homosexuality that the film seems to give rather a black eye to heterosexual life.

The language the screenplay used to describe its controversial subject attracted comment. It used "the familiar colloquial terms", wrote one reviewer without specifying them, even as he referred to "homosexuality", "the abnormality", and "the condition". The term "queer" – then a pejorative term not yet adopted by advocates for LGBT rights – is used several times in the film, and "FARR IS QUEER" is painted on Farr's garage door. The more polite term "invert" appears as well.

Lukas Heller, who had written additional dialogue for Sapphire, was an uncredited co-writer on the film.

=== Casting ===
When the team of producer Michael Relph and director Basil Dearden first approached Bogarde, several actors had already turned down the role, including Jack Hawkins, James Mason, and Stewart Granger. (It has been argued Hawkins' casting "would have killed the film.") In 1960, Bogarde was 39 and had been chosen by British audiences as their favourite British film star for years, having spent the past 14 years being cast as a matinée idol by The Rank Organisation. He had proven himself playing war heroes in films such as The Sea Shall Not Have Them (1954) and Ill Met by Moonlight (1957), he was the star of the hugely successful Doctor film series, and he had been a reliable romantic lead in films such as A Tale of Two Cities (1958). He was also flirting with a larger, Hollywood career, having recently played Franz Liszt in Song Without End (1960).

Bogarde was suspected to be homosexual and lived in the same house as his business manager, Anthony Forwood, so he was compelled to be seen occasionally in public with attractive young women. He seems not to have hesitated to accept the role of Farr, a married lawyer with a homosexual past that he has not quite put behind him. Reportedly, Bogarde himself wrote the scene in which Farr admits to his wife that he is gay and has continued to be attracted to other men, despite his earlier assurances to the contrary.

Of his first independent film project and 34th film, Bogarde said in 1965: "For the first time I was playing my own age. At Rank, the fixed rule was that I had to look pretty. Victim ended all that nonsense." He wrote years later in his autobiography that his father had suggested he make an adaptation of The Mayor of Casterbridge, "But I did Victim instead, ... playing the barrister with the loving wife, a loyal housekeeper, devoted secretary and the Secret Passion. It was the wisest decision I ever made in my cinematic life. It is extraordinary, in this over-permissive age [c. 1988], to believe that this modest film could ever have been considered courageous, daring or dangerous to make. It was, in its time, all three."

Similarly, though several actresses had turned down the role, Sylvia Syms readily accepted the part of Laura. English film critic Mark Kermode has noted her reasons for this included previous theatre work with John Gielgud, which exposed her to the laws surrounding homosexuality at the time, and that a family friend of hers had died by suicide after being accused of being gay. Consequently, Syms felt the film's story had to be told. As well as Bogarde, other cast members who were gay in real life include Dennis Price, Noel Howlett and Hilton Edwards.

In January 1961 Earl St John, head of production at Rank, announced Rank would make fourteen films for the year at a cost of £2.5 million, "films with contemporary subjects suitable for a world market. All these films will be made with good taste and there will be no sensationalism." One of the riskier projects was Boy Barrett which was the original title for Victim.

=== Filming ===
Syms later recalled that filming had to be completed in just 10 days. Shooting locations included The Salisbury, Covent Garden. The film's original title of Boy Barrett was changed to Victim late in production. Relph and Dearden acknowledged that the film was designed to be "an open protest against Britain's law that being a homosexual is a criminal act".

== Censor reaction ==
=== British censor ===
An official of the British Board of Film Censors (BBFC) had set out its view of homosexuality in film: "to the great majority of cinema-goers, homosexuality is outside their direct experience and is something which is shocking, distasteful and disgusting". Relph said that in Victim, by contrast: "What I think we want to say is that the homosexual, although subject to a psychological or glandular variation from sexual normality, is a human being subject to all the emotions of other human beings, and as deserving of our understanding. Unless he sets out to corrupt others, it is wrong for the law to pillory him because of his inversion." He said Victim was "a story not of glands but of love."

Although a number of controversial scenes were cut before the film's release during discussions with the BBFC, including scenes with teenagers, the BBFC nevertheless gave the film an "X" rating—that is, "recommended for adults only"—a classification which was then usually reserved for erotica and horror films. In a letter to the filmmakers, the BBFC secretary raised four objections to the film. First, a male character says of another man: "I wanted him". Second, references to "self-control" in the revised script were omitted from the filmed discussion of homosexuality, leaving the discussion "without sufficient counterbalance". Third, the film implies that homosexuality is a choice, which "is a dangerous idea to put into the minds of adolescents who see the film". Finally, the one blackmailer who unleashes a tirade against homosexuality is so unsympathetic that the views expressed will be discredited.

=== US censor ===
In the United States, the Motion Picture Association of America's Production Code Administration, the film industry's self-censorship board that enforced the guidelines established by the Motion Picture Production Code, denied Victim its seal of approval. A spokesperson cited the film's "candid and clinical discussion of homosexuality" and its "overtly expressed pleas for social acceptance of the homosexual, to the extent that he be made socially tolerable". He noted that the subject of homosexuality was acceptable under the recently relaxed Production Code if handled with "care, discretion and restraint".

The head of the US distributor appealed the decision and announced the film would be released in February even if the appeal was denied. He described Victim as a "tasteful film on a delicate subject". A few years before the release of Victim, the filmmakers of Suddenly, Last Summer (1959) had persuaded the code censors to allow that film to use homosexuality as a plot device, but only by presenting it through cryptic innuendos, and the film had to illustrate the "horrors of such a lifestyle". Victim, in contrast, was deemed to be too frank in its treatment of homosexuality, and not initially approved by the censorship code.

In 1962, the Hollywood Production Code agreed to lift the ban on films using homosexuality as a plot device. A few years later, the code was replaced by the MPAA film rating system, which introduced an age-appropriate classification system for films. As attitudes became more liberal, the rating classifications for the film were revised, and when Victim was released on VHS in the US in 1986, it was rated PG-13.

== Release and reception ==
Victim premiered at the Odeon Cinema in Leicester Square on 31 August 1961, and its US premiere occurred on 5 February 1962 at two theaters in New York. It was the only British entry in the Venice Film Festival in 1961. According to an article by Stephen G. Watts written for The New York Times, an unnamed Italian critic at the festival commented: "at last the British have stopped being hypocrites".

=== Box office ===
The film was not a major hit, but it was popular, regarded by Kinematograph Weekly as a "money maker" at the British box office in 1961.

By 1971 it had earned an estimated profit of £51,762.

=== Critical reception ===
British reviews of the film praised Bogarde's performance as his best and praised his courage in taking on the role. A London magazine called it "the most startlingly outspoken film Britain has ever produced". An anonymous reviewer in The Times commented that "Victim may not say a great deal about" the related issues of the nature of 'love' and gay men's "genuine feeling" for each other, "but what it does say is reasoned and just; and it does invite a compassionate consideration of this particular form of human bondage". However, Terence Kelly of Sight and Sound saw problems with the film, and wrote that Victim contains "a tour of the more respectable parts of the London homosexual underworld, with glimpses of the ways in which different men cope with or are destroyed by their abnormality", but he did comment that "the film unequivocally condemns the way" blackmail "is encouraged by the present state of the law".

Bosley Crowther wrote that the film "appears more substantial and impressive than its dramatic content justifies" because "it deals with a subject that heretofore has been studiously shied away from or but cautiously hinted at on the commercial screen". He found the script "routine" and "shoddily constructed" as drama, but successful as a political argument:

[A]s a frank and deliberate exposition of the well-known presence and plight of the tacit homosexual in modern society it is certainly unprecedented and intellectually bold. It makes no bones about the existence of the problem and about using the familiar colloquial terms. The very fact that homosexuality as a condition is presented honestly and unsensationally, with due regard for the dilemma and the pathos, makes this an extraordinary film.

Crowther qualified his praise of Bogarde's acting, saying that "Dirk Bogarde does a strong, forceful, forthright job, with perhaps a little too much melancholy and distress in his attitude, now and again", and summed up his mixed view with the statement: "While the subject is disagreeable, it is not handled distastefully. And while the drama is not exciting, it has a definite intellectual appeal."

Chris Waters has argued that "Victim took for granted that homosexuality was a social problem that needed to be explored calmly and dispassionately" as a result of the "wake of the social dislocations associated with the war and the various anxieties to which they gave rise". He elaborated on this further by referring to Kenneth Soddy, a physician in the Department of Psychological Medicine at University College London Hospital, who wrote in 1954 that, while homosexuality itself did not trouble the community, its "social disturbance" during the war caused "variations in social and sexual practices which engenders attacks of acute public anxiety." As such, Waters argues that the film portrays homosexuality in a sensationalised way that would have deliberately drawn public attention to the issue.

Before the film was released in the US, a news report in The New York Times described it as a political work, saying: "the movie is a dramatized condemnation, based on the Wolfenden Report, of Britain's laws on homosexuality."

In relation to a BFI Southbank retrospective screening season of Bogarde's films, Peter Bradshaw argued that "it could be that Victim may come to be valued, 50 years on, not as a study of homosexuality, but of blackmail and paranoia." He pointed out that Farr never engages in homosexual acts, but, rather, "appears" to have a "passionate, unconsummated infatuation with a young man at university" and then, later, a liaison with a "young building-site worker", both unconsummated arrangements to prove his interest. Bradshaw wrote that Bogarde's lighting is more haunting than necessary in the confrontation scenes with his wife, and noticed similarities to the work of Patrick Hamilton, especially "the seedy, nasty world of pubs and drinking holes around ... London's West End", concluding his review with the statement: "It is perhaps in its evocation of the strange, occult world of blackmail, conspiracy and shame, and the seediness of a certain type of London, that Victim holds up best."

Victim became a highly sociologically significant film, and many believe it played an influential role in liberalising attitudes and the laws in Britain regarding homosexuality. Alan Burton conducted a 2010 study of "various documents relating to the Wolfenden Report, public opinion, censorship, and the production and reception of Victim," and found that the film, which "has attracted much criticism and debate, largely in terms of its liberal prescriptions and its 'timid' handling of a controversial theme", had "significant impact on gay men who struggled with their identity and subjectivity at a time when their sexuality was potentially illegal".

=== Home media ===
The film was released on DVD by The Criterion Collection in January 2011 as part of their "Eclipse Series" box set "Basil Dearden’s London Underground". It was released on Blu-ray by Network in July 2014.

== Adaptations ==
The film's producers had a novelisation written by Arthur Calder-Marshall, who wrote under the name William Drummond. The novelisation differs from the film in some details—for example, "Farr" is "Carr" in the book—and there are some additional details—for example, in the book Carr wonders if he married Laura because she closely resembles her brother, with whom he has long been "sentimentally in love".

In July 2017, marking the 50th anniversary of the Sexual Offences Act, BBC Radio 3 broadcast a play dramatising the making of the film, with Ed Stoppard as Bogarde.

== See also ==
- Different from the Others (Anders als die Andern) (1919), a German silent film precursor of Victim
- The Children's Hour (1961), a film involving charges of lesbianism
- List of lesbian, gay, bisexual or transgender-related films
