= 7 Women =

1966 film by John Ford

- Theatrical release poster by Reynold Brown
- Directed by: John Ford
- Written by: Janet Green; John McCormick
- Based on: "Chinese Finale"; 1935 short story by Norah Lofts
- Produced by: Bernard Smith; John Ford
- Starring: Anne Bancroft; Sue Lyon; Margaret Leighton; Flora Robson; Mildred Dunnock; Betty Field; Anna Lee; Eddie Albert
- Cinematography: Joseph LaShelle
- Edited by: Otho Lovering
- Music by: Elmer Bernstein
- Color process: Metrocolor (MGM Color)
- Distributed by: Metro-Goldwyn-Mayer
- Release dates: January 5, 1966 (Los Angeles); May 4, 1966 (New York)
- Running time: 87 minutes 93 minutes (Director's cut)
- Country: United States
- Languages: English; Mandarin
- Budget: $2.3 million

7 Women (also known as Seven Women), is a 1966 historical drama film directed by John Ford and starring Anne Bancroft, Sue Lyon, Margaret Leighton, Flora Robson, Mildred Dunnock, Betty Field, Anna Lee, Eddie Albert, Mike Mazurki, and Woody Strode. It was produced by Ford and Bernard Smith from a screenplay by Janet Green and John McCormick, based on the short story "Chinese Finale" by Norah Lofts. The musical score was conducted by Elmer Bernstein and the cinematography was handled by Joseph LaShelle, shot in Panavision. This was the last feature film directed by Ford, ending a career that had spanned 53 years.

Ford biographer Joseph McBride dubbed the director's farewell to the art form "as bleak an apocalyptic vision as the cinema has given us."

== Plot ==
In rural China in 1935, all but one of the white residents of a remote Christian mission post are women. The strict Miss Agatha Andrews heads the mission, assisted by the meek Miss Argent. Charles Pether is a teacher who always wanted to be a preacher; his loud, peevish, panicky, self-centered and domineering 42-year-old wife Florrie is pregnant for the first time. Emma Clark is the only young staff member. A much-needed doctor arrives, Dr. Cartwright. The staff is shocked to discover that Cartwright is a woman from Chicago, who smokes, drinks alcohol, swears, wears pants, has short hair, disdains religion, and sits before grace. Miss Andrews and Dr. Cartwright are soon at odds. Emma, who has led a very sheltered life, is fascinated by the newcomer, much to Miss Andrews' dismay. Dr. Cartwright urges Pether to send Florrie to a modern maternity ward to have her baby, because her age places her at high risk, but they refuse. Later, she appeals to Miss Andrews. In vain, Andrews warns Emma that Dr. Cartwright is evil.

Miss Andrews is certain that the mission will be safe since they are American citizens. After a nearby British mission is burned by Mongolian warlord Tunga Khan, Miss Andrews reluctantly accepts survivors Miss Binns, Mrs. Russell, Miss Ling, and some of their people, but only temporarily. She is unwilling to harbor those of any other denomination for long. The survivors bring cholera with them. Dr. Cartwright quickly takes command, ordering clothing and possessions burnt and immunizing everyone. Emma falls ill, and Miss Andrews implores Dr. Cartwright to save her life. The emergency passes and an intoxicated Cartwright appears in the dining room with a bottle of whiskey, offering a drink to all and provoking an extreme reaction in Mrs. Russell. Cartwright talks about the hardships of being a woman doctor and of being betrayed by her married lover.

One night, Charles and Cartwright see a fire on the horizon and hear gunfire. The next morning, the Chinese soldiers of the nearby garrison evacuate, as Tunga Khan and his men approach. Miss Andrews is still convinced that the mission is untouchable, but Charles is now determined to be assertive. Kim, an English-speaking male Chinese mission staff member, and he drive out to investigate. The car returns, and bandits on horseback charge through and quickly take command of the mission. Before being executed by the bandits, Kim tells the women that Charles was murdered when he tried to rescue a woman being raped by Tunga Khan's men. Miss Ling, who comes from a powerful Mandarin family, is taken away to act as servant to Tunga Khan's young wife, and the seven white women are herded into a shed. The women watch as Tunga Khan has every Chinese in the mission executed. He comes into the shed and tries to take Emma. Realizing that they are mostly Americans, he decides to ask for a ransom, instead.

With Miss Andrews panicking and Florrie in labor, Dr. Cartwright asks for her desperately needed medical bag. Tunga Khan offers to exchange it for her sexual submission to him. The doctor agrees, and helps Florrie give birth to a baby boy. Cartwright goes to fulfill her end of the bargain. Andrews' pathological revulsion for anything to do with sex—even in marriage—causes her to become increasingly deranged. She vilifies Cartwright, repeatedly calling her "whore of Babylon". The others understand the sacrifice the doctor has made and why she has done so.

In the evening, the Mongols hold wrestling matches. Dr. Cartwright watches the spectacle at Tunga Khan's side as his new concubine. A warrior who has been ogling Cartwright steps into the ring. Tunga Khan accepts the challenge himself and breaks the man's neck. Cartwright convinces Tunga Khan to free the other women. Now dressed in embroidered silk robes, she comes to tell them. Miss Argent sees Dr. Cartwright hide a bottle that she had earlier called poison. Though she warns, "It's a sin," Cartwright replies "Then pray for me." With the others safely away, Cartwright secretly poisons two drinks. Bowing, she offers a cup to Tunga Khan saying, "So long, ya bastard." After Tunga Khan drinks and collapses dead, Cartwright takes a sip from her cup.

== Cast ==
- Anne Bancroft as Dr. D. R. Cartwright
- Sue Lyon as Emma Clark, Mission Staff
- Margaret Leighton as Agatha Andrews, Head of Mission
- Flora Robson as Miss Binns, Head of British Mission
- Mildred Dunnock as Jane Argent, Andrews' Assistant
- Betty Field as Mrs. Florrie Pether, Charles' pregnant wife
- Anna Lee as Mrs. Russell, Mission Staff
- Eddie Albert as Charles Pether, Mission Teacher
- Mike Mazurki as Tunga Khan, Bandit Leader
- Woody Strode as Lean Warrior
- Jane Chang as Miss Ling, Mission Staff
- Hans William Lee as Kim, Mission Staff
- H.W. Gim as Coolie
- Irene Tsu as Chinese Girl

== Production ==
The original story, "Chinese Finale", was presented as an episode of Alcoa Theatre in March 1960 with Hilda Plowright as Miss Andrews and Jan Sterling as Dr. Mary Cartwright.

John Ford considered both Katharine Hepburn and Jennifer Jones for the role of Dr. Cartwright, and Rosalind Russell lobbied for the part, but eventually Patricia Neal was cast. Ford began the film on February 8, 1965, on the MGM back lot, but Neal suffered a stroke after three days of filming. Anne Bancroft took the role of Dr. Cartwright, but Ford was unhappy with her and called her "the mistress of monotone". Ford originally considered Carol Lynley for the role of Emma Clark but MGM insisted on contract star Sue Lyon. Shooting finished on April 12, six days behind schedule.

To edit the film, Ford chose Otho Lovering, with whom he had worked on Stagecoach (1939). Lovering edited most of Ford's feature films in the 1960s.

== Reception ==
In a contemporary review for The New York Times, critic Howard Thompson wrote: "Mr. Ford's picture, which gets off to a graphic, arresting start (with some ripe Elmer Bernstein music) tapers off to a stark, bony melodrama of female hysteria and mayhem. ... What steadies the film and almost severs it, in fact, is a sizzling, earthy performance by Miss Bancroft, as a profane, hard-bitten doctor whose arrival tilts the mission even before the barbarians roar into view. Miss Bancroft, a little mannered heretofore, is simply wonderful, from her first bleak appraisal of the premises to the obvious, tragic fadeout, by which time the mission seems like an Oriental East Lynne."

Los Angeles Times critic Philip K. Scheuer wrote: "It is possible (though less probable) that in the scene-by-scene shooting everything may have looked and sounded all right. But as it plays today consecutively on the screen, the sequence of events just doesn't add up to anything convincing."

On Rotten Tomatoes, the film holds an 83% rating, based on six reviews.

== Awards ==
The film has appeared in numerous lists:

- Most Misappreciated American Films of All Time (1977, Andrew Sarris)
- Most Misappreciated American Films of All Time (1977, Pascal Bonitzer)
- Most Misappreciated American Films of All Time (1977, Serge Daney)
- Most Important American Films (1977, Enno Patalas)
- Most Important American Films (1977, Luc Moullet)
- Genre Favorites: Adventure (1993)
- Alternative Choices to Sight and Sound's 360 Films Classics List (1998)
- 100 Essential Films (2003–present, Slant Magazine)
- Favorite Films (1975, Syndicat Français de la Critique de Cinema)

Cahiers du cinéma voted the film the sixth-best of 1966 and Andrew Sarris rated it the third-best of the year (behind Blow-up and Gertrud).

== See also ==
- List of American films of 1966
