= Man in the Moon (film) =

1960 British film by Basil Dearden

- Theatrical poster
- Directed by: Basil Dearden
- Written by: Michael Relph; Bryan Forbes
- Produced by: Michael Relph
- Starring: Kenneth More; Shirley Anne Field
- Cinematography: Harry Waxman
- Edited by: John D. Guthridge
- Music by: Philip Green
- Production companies: Excalibur Films; Allied Film Makers
- Distributed by: J. Arthur Rank Film Distributors
- Release date: 31 October 1960
- Running time: 98 min.
- Country: United Kingdom
- Language: English
- Budget: £202,000

Man in the Moon is a 1960 British comedy film directed by Basil Dearden and starring Kenneth More and Shirley Anne Field. It was written by Michael Relph and Bryan Forbes.

== Plot ==
William Blood is a man who appears to be immune to all known diseases, and possesses extraordinary resistance to heat and cold – a fact he puts down to his carefree, single life, (Note: More drives a three-wheeled Messerschmitt KR201 Roadster car, although a car shown damaged beneath a lorry is an earlier KR175.) never committing to any woman, and never being worried by anything. He makes a living working for medical researchers who are trying to find cures for various diseases and conditions (notably the common cold and seasickness).

Blood is offered a job by Dr Davidson to become the passenger of a high altitude test flight, but the real job is to become the first man to land on the Moon. The truth is kept from him because of the extreme danger involved, and because they regard him as expendable. He undertakes training with three other potential astronauts, including one named Leo, all expensively trained and more qualified for the job but without Blood's extraordinary resistances. Blood never really fits in with the others and, when a £100,000 reward is posted for the first man to land on the Moon, they seek to sabotage his chances and have one of their number selected instead.

When Blood meets and falls in love with an attractive stripper named Polly, he begins to lose his immunity. Spurred by the news of the reward, he decides to continue his training so that he and Polly will be able to afford a new home when he returns. Leo becomes insanely jealous and tries to sabotage Blood's training, but he manages to survive the attempt. When the scientists realise that Leo is the saboteur they use a session in a sensory deprivation chamber to brainwash him into believing he is Blood's best friend. Later, when Polly falls into a river and is in danger of drowning, Leo saves her but allows Blood to take the credit.

Once their training is complete, the astronauts are flown to the Woomera rocket base and Blood takes part in what appears to be a completely successful launch. Three days later, he steps out of his capsule onto what he believes to be the Moon's surface. While exploring, he is startled by what appears to be an extraterrestrial being, but then spots a used baked beans can. He finds out his capsule had ejected from the rocket prematurely, landing him in the Australian outback only a few miles from Woomera, and the "alien" turns out to be a man prospecting for uranium.

Making his way back to the base, Blood tells the scientists "back to the drawing board". Back in England, he and Polly take part in a test for family planning. The three cots by their bed indicate that the test has been successful.

== Cast ==
- Kenneth More as William Blood
- Shirley Anne Field as Polly
- Norman Bird as Herbert
- Michael Hordern as Dr. Davidson
- John Glyn-Jones as Dr. Wilmot
- John Phillips as Professor Stephens
- Charles Gray as Leo
- Bernard Horsfall as Rex
- Bruce Boa as Roy
- Noel Purcell as prospector
- Ed Devereaux as storekeeper
- Newton Blick as Dr. Hollis
- Richard Pearson as 1st doctor
- Danny Green as lorry driver
- Jeremy Lloyd as Jaguar driver

== Production ==
In order to make Man in the Moon appear authentic, the production company spent months "in scientific research" so that "those scenes in which the space men are trained for their trip to the moon" were credible. "With the consent of the British Air Ministry, certain top-secret information – including experiments in rocket propulsion, conditions under tests, and the reactions of bodies to extreme pressure – was made available. More data came from America and, strangely, even more from Russian sources".

== Release ==
Man in the Moon had a Royal Charity Premiere attended by Queen Elizabeth II and Prince Philip, Duke of Edinburgh on 31 October 1960 at the Odeon Leicester Square and entered general release on the Rank circuit (Odeons and Gaumonts) from mid-January 1961.

== Reception ==
=== Critical ===
The Monthly Film Bulletin wrote: "Michael Relph's and Bryan Forbes' script is an unattractive mixture of macabre savagery (in its brainwashing and training sequences) and tepid satire on bureaucracy, medicine and science. John Phillips, Michael Hordern and John Glyn-Jones rise above their naive material as the scientists – all popular misconceptions; and Shirley Anne Field as an extraneous strip-tease dancer struggles gamely in the face of a general lack of directorial guidance."

Kine Weekly wrote: "The digs at boffins and spacemen are sharp, but never malicious, and authentic atmosphere and detail give essential contrast to the fooling."

Variety called it "amiably amusing".

Filmink wrote that "the film has a weak central idea" and "suffers from a particularly smart-arse, smug script."

In the New York Times Bosley Crowther described the plot as following a course of "appropriately wacky illogic". He further considered More the key to the "utterly slapdash film, which qualifies for attention because of its cheerfulness and Mr. More".

=== Box office ===
Man in the Moon performed disappointingly at the box office. It has been called "More's first real flop" since he became a movie star. By 1971, the film was still £37,000 short of breaking even.

== DVD release ==
Man in the Moon is available on Region 2 DVD.

== Novelisation ==
A novelisation of the Man in the Moon screenplay was written by John Foley and published in the UK by Four Square Books, Ltd. The copyright date of 1960 would indicate that it was published slightly in advance of the film's general release. The book runs 160 pages and contains a four-page insert of black-and-white movie stills.
