= The Barnstormers =

1964 British children's TV series

- Written by: Joy Thwaytes; Henry Soskin
- Directed by: Marc Miller
- Starring: Dennis Waterman; Peter Hempson; Gearld Rowland; Patricia Wilson; John Pike
- Original language: United Kingdom
- No. of series: 1
- No. of episodes: 11 (3 missing)

Production
- Running time: 25 minutes
- Production company: Associated-Rediffusion

Original release
- Network: ITV
- Release: 3 March – 19 May 1964

The Barnstormers is a British television series made by Associated-Rediffusion and aired on ITV in 1964. The series was adapted by Henry Soskin from a play by Joy Thwaytes and starred Dennis Waterman.

== Story ==
Five teenagers, Mike, Philip, Rusty, Sarah and Alan decided to form their own theatre group using an 18th century watermill owned by Phillip's aunt, Mrs Herrid as their venue. As the children plan their first play, they begin to uncover aspects of the old mill's history. It is rumoured to be the former home of a pirate who hid his treasure within the walls. Their discovery's lead them to a secret tunnel behind a trap door but time is against them as Ludgate, a property developer who has also heard of the treasure, plans to buy the mill.

== Cast ==
- Dennis Waterman as Mike
- Peter Hempson as Philip
- Gerald Rowland as Rusty
- Patricia Wilson as Sarah
- John Pike as Alan
- Bernard Lloyd as Eddie
- Henry Lincoln as Mr Selborne
- Hector Ross as Ludgate
- John Rapley as Camberley (uncredited)
- Meg Ritchie as Margaret
- Nora Nicholson as Mrs Herrid
- A.J. Brown as Alderman Purbeck (uncredited)

== Episodes ==
Episode No.	Episode Title	Director	Original Broadcast Date	Archive Status
1	"Mystery at the Mill"	Marc Miller	3 March 1964	Missing
2	"Philip"	Marc Miller	10 March 1964	Missing
3	"The Lost Treasure"	Marc Miller	17 March 1964	Exists
4	"Enter a Stranger"	Marc Miller	24 March 1964	Exists
5	"The Trap"	Marc Miller	31 March 1964	Exists
6	"Camberley's Quest"	Marc Miller	7 April 1964	Exists
7	"The Spanish Casket"	Marc Miller	21 April 1964	Exists
8	"A Door to Nowhere"	Marc Miller	28 April 1964	Exists
9	"Rusty in Danger"	Marc Miller	5 May 1964	Exists
10	"Old Alexander's Secret"	Marc Miller	12 May 1964	Exists
11	"Play Making with the Barnstormers"	Marc Miller	19 May 1964	Missing

== Missing episodes ==
Episodes 1, 2 and 11 are missing. The 8 surviving episodes were also missing until 2021 when they were found and rebroadcast on Talking Pictures TV.
