= 1964 New York Film Critics Circle Awards =

30th New York Film Critics Circle Awards

30th New York Film Critics Circle Awards

January 23, 1965
(announced December 28, 1964)

My Fair Lady

The 30th New York Film Critics Circle Awards, honored the best filmmaking of 1964.

== Winners ==
- Best Actor:
  - Rex Harrison - My Fair Lady
- Best Actress:
  - Kim Stanley - Séance on a Wet Afternoon
- Best Director:
  - Stanley Kubrick - Dr. Strangelove or: How I Learned to Stop Worrying and Love the Bomb
- Best Film:
  - My Fair Lady
- Best Foreign Language Film:
  - That Man from Rio (L'homme de Rio) • Italy/France
- Best Screenplay:
  - Harold Pinter - The Servant
- Special Award
  - To Be Alive!
