= A. J. Brown (actor) =

English actor (1897–1978)

- Born: Alfred John Brown; 14 September 1897
- Died: 29 January 1978 (aged 80); Westminster, London, England
- Occupation: actor

Alfred John Brown (14 September 1897 – 29 January 1978) was an English theatre, film and television actor.

== Career ==
The obituarist in The Times noted that Brown fought in both world wars, winning the Military Cross in the First. He was intended for the legal profession, but abandoned his father's solicitor's practice in the early 1920s in favour of the stage. His theatre successes included Michael Frayn's comedies Alphabetical Order and Donkey's Years, in the second of which he was performing at the time of his sudden death.

He appeared in many British television series and films including The Adventures of Robin Hood, Dixon of Dock Green, Bomb in the High Street, The Trials of Oscar Wilde, Lord Jim, Out of the Unknown, Emergency Ward 10, The Avengers and Hands of the Ripper.

== Screen credits ==
Title	Year	Role	Notes
The Princess in Kensington	1952	The Archbishop of Canterbury	TV Short
The Adventures of Robin Hood	1955–1957	Uncle George Fitzwalter / Abbot / Sir Edward de Courcey	3 episodes
The Chertsey Apprentice	1956	Percy Sykes	TV movie
Dixon of Dock Green	1956–1957	Alderman Mayhew / Mr. Armour	2 episodes
ITV Play of the Week	1956–1962	Edward / Harry Freeman / Judge Advocate / The Statue	4 episodes
BBC Sunday Night Theatre	1957	Roger Crawford	Episode: "Myself a Stranger"
The First Mrs. Fraser	1957	Philip Logan	TV movie
Five Names for Johnny	1957	Coroner	Episode: "The Accusation"
Target	1958		Episode: "Turmoil"
Dial 999 (TV series)	1959	Unknown / Fowles	2 episodes
Emergency Ward 10	1959	Harry Wright	3 episodes
Mr. Bossom's Day	1959	Curtis	TV movie
Probation Officer	1959–1961	Judge Kempton	12 episodes
Edgar Wallace Mysteries	1960	Commandant of Police	Episode: "Clue of the Twisted Candle"
Portrait of Man	1960	Doctor	TV movie
The Trials of Oscar Wilde	1960	Justice Collins	Film
Bootsie and Snudge	1960	Sir Hector Macdonald	Episode: "Civvy Street"
Circle of Deception	1960	Frank Bowen	Film
No Man's Island	1960	Captain Cork	2 episodes
BBC Sunday-Night Play	1961	Coroner	Episode: "Scene of the Accident"
Family Solicitor	1961	William Naylor	6 episodes
Bomb in the High Street	1961	Nightwatchman	Film
Crying Down the Lane	1962	Justice Haslam	Unknown episode
The Traitors	1962	Minister	Film
Suspense	1962	Dr. Rapier	Episode: "Virus X"
Once Aboard the Lugger...	1963	Captain Cork	Episode: "The Girl Arrives"
First Night	1963	Judge	Episode: "Do Me No Favours"
Woman of Straw	1964	Third Executive	Film, Uncredited
The Barnstormers	1964	Alderman Purbeck	2 episodes
The Massingham Affair	1964	Judge	Unknown episode
Walk a Tightrope	1964	Magistrate	Film
Compact	1965	Enoch Farrar	2 episodes
Lord Jim	1965	Magistrate	Film
The Sullavan Brothers	1964–1965	Mr. Justice Ryner	8 episodes
The Mind of the Enemy	1965	Berridge	4 episodes
Heiress of Garth	1965	Mr. Acherley	Unknown episode
Out of the Unknown	1965	Judge	Episode: "The Midas Plague"
Dr. Finlay's Casebook	1966	Sir James Nicol-Scorgie	Episode: "Free Medicine"
The Liars	1966	Hector Cathie	1 episode
Sergeant Cork	1964–1966	Sir Edward / John Thor	3 episodes
The Man in Room 17	1966	Peter Hendy	Episode: "Where There's a Will"
United!	1966	Justice Lenworth	1 episode
The Avengers	1966–1967	Dr. Gibson / Dawson	2 episodes
The Forsyte Saga	1967	Roger Forsyte	5 episodes
Sir Arthur Conan Doyle	1967	Prof. Esdaile	Episode: "The Chemistry of Love"
The Gamblers	1967	Magistrate	Episode: "How Well Do You Know This Man?"
Vanity Fair	1967	Bute Crawley	2 episodes
The Very Merry Widow	1967–1968	Mr. Tiffin	3 episodes
Ten Days That Shook the World	1967		Voice, TV Documentary
City '68	1968		Episode: "Love Thy Neighbour"
The ITV Play	1968	Uncle Oliver	Epsidoe: "Sarah"
ITV Playhouse	1968	Auctioneer	Episode: "Rogues' Gallery: The Tale of Lancelot Wishart"
Resurrection	1968	Ivanov	Episode: "Dmitri"
Softly, Softly	1969	James Russell	Episode: "Right to Search"
Imperial Palace	1969	Dennis Dover	2 episodes
W. Somerset Maugham	1969	Sir Augustus Fitzherbert	Episode: "Lord Mountdrago"
Battle of Britain	1969	Air Observer	Film, Uncredited
Hadleigh	1969	Sir George Withy	Episode: "Patron of the Arts"
Randall and Hopkirk (Deceased)	1970	Judge	Episode: "Could You Recognise the Man Again?"
The Last Grenade	1970	Governor	Film, Uncredited
Clegg	1970	Joseph Valentine	Film
She Follows Me About	1970	The Bishop	TV movie
Jamie	1971	Mr. Hudson	Episode: "The Devil's Rookery"
Hands of the Ripper	1971	Rev. Anderson	Film
Villains	1972	Judge	Voice / Uncredited; 3 episodes
Thriller	1973	Judge	Episode: "The Colour of Blood"
Within These Walls	1974	George	Episode: "Guessing Game"
The Morecambe & Wise Show	1971–1974	Mr. Howe / The Connoisseurs Host	2 episodes
Father Brown	1974	Augustus Aylmer	Episode: "The Dagger with Wings"
Second Time Around	1974	Registrar	Episode: "Oh Happy, Happy Wedding Day"
Flame	1975	Chairman of the Board	Film, (final film role)
