= Bomb in the High Street =

1963 British film by Peter Bezencenet and Terry Bishop

- British quad poster
- Directed by: Peter Bezencenet; Terry Bishop
- Written by: Ben Simcoe
- Produced by: Theodore Zichy
- Starring: Ronald Howard; Terry Palmer; Suzanna Leigh; Jack Allen
- Cinematography: Gordon Dines
- Edited by: John Trumper
- Music by: Wilfred Josephs
- Release date: 1963
- Running time: 60 minutes
- Country: United Kingdom
- Language: English

Bomb in the High Street is a 1963 British second feature ('B') drama film directed by Peter Bezencenet and Terry Bishop starring Ronald Howard, Terry Palmer and Suzanna Leigh. It was written by Ben Simcoe.

== Plot ==
An unexploded bomb is reported in a village street. Superintendent Halsey evacuates the village and Captain Manning's bomb disposal starts work. But there is no bomb. Manning's men are criminals robbing the bank while the police cordon keeps everyone away.

Runaway teenagers Mike and Jackie, who have been sleeping rough nearby, are captured by the criminals, but they escape and alert the police.

== Cast ==
- Ronald Howard as Captain Manning
- Terry Palmer as Mike
- Suzanna Leigh as Jackie
- Jack Allen as Superintendent Halsey
- Peter Gilmore as Shorty
- Russell Waters as Trent
- Maurice Good as Feeney
- Geoffrey Bayldon as Clay
- Jack Lambert as sergeant
- Humphrey Lestocq as reporter
- A. J. Brown as nightwatchman
- Gerald Case as Ventry
- Margaret Lacey as woman at barrier
- Leonard Sachs as Freeling
- James Villiers as Stevens

== Critical reception ==
The Monthly Film Bulletin wrote: "Uneven scripting and production throw away the film's three useful thriller gimmicks – the bomb hoax, the couple waking in a deserted village, the device for speeding-up the bank's time lock. Little tension is created, the final chase is got under way but concluded off-screen, and efforts to be with-it or saucy on-screen merely embarrass. Terry Palmer's pleasantly sympathetic manner of acting, as the young eloper, suggests that he deserves a better part."

Kine Weekly wrote: "Out-of-the-rut bank robbery thriller, with a strong flavour of youthful romance. Story well told with economy, acting fresh, thrills well sustained. Above-average support."

Boxoffice wrote: "An exciting and suspenseful little programmer ... has thrills for the action devotees and a pleasing teenage romance to attract the younger set."

In The British 'B' Film, Chibnall and McFarlane write that film: "begins well and creates an atmosphere promising strangeness. If it doesn't quite fulfil this promise, it's still offers a more interesting critique of prevailing social attitudes and values that many films of the period."
