= Cast a Dark Shadow =

1955 British film by Lewis Gilbert

- Theatrical release poster
- Directed by: Lewis Gilbert
- Written by: John Cresswell
- Based on: Murder Mistaken; 1952 play by Janet Green
- Produced by: Herbert Mason
- Starring: Dirk Bogarde; Margaret Lockwood; Kay Walsh; Kathleen Harrison; Robert Flemyng
- Cinematography: Jack Asher
- Edited by: Gordon Pilkington
- Music by: Antony Hopkins
- Distributed by: Eros Films Ltd. (UK); Distributors Corporation of America (US)
- Release dates: 20 September 1955 (London); 27 November 1957 (United States)
- Running time: 82 minutes
- Country: United Kingdom
- Language: English

Cast a Dark Shadow is a 1955 British suspense film noir directed by Lewis Gilbert and written by John Cresswell, based on the 1952 play Murder Mistaken by Janet Green. It stars Dirk Bogarde, Margaret Lockwood, Kay Walsh, Kathleen Harrison, and Robert Flemyng. The film was released on 20 September 1955, distributed by Eros Films Ltd. in the United Kingdom and Distributors Corporation of America in the United States. The story concerns a husband who murders his wife.

== Plot ==
Married for a year, Edward "Teddy" Bare kills his wealthy older wife Monica after she asks her lawyer Phillip Mortimer to change her will. He stages it to look as if she accidentally asphyxiated while drunkenly trying to light the gas fire (he having assiduously encouraged her to drink heavily as part of his control over her).

To his dismay, he discovers that she intended to leave him all her money; instead, he only inherits the mansion from a previous will while her fortune is left in trust to her only relative, her sister Dora. She leaves £200 to the elderly maid, but Edward convinces the maid that this money was in lieu of wages, getting her to work for free. Edward will receive the main inheritance only if Dora dies. An inquest rules Monica's death an accident, but her lawyer, Phillip, makes it clear that he suspects foul play. When Edward asks where Dora lives, Phillip tells him she is in Jamaica.

Edward meets Freda, a merry widow, in a seaside hotel and woos her. He invites her to stay at the large house he has inherited, which she agrees to, becoming friendly with the maid.

Edward marries Freda, who is closer to Edward's age than Monica was, but is far less trusting, keeping tight control over her fortune. As the death of a second wife so soon after the first, would be highly suspicious, he is powerless to do anything. The new couple meet a stranger to the area called Charlotte Young, whose car has broken down. She is looking for a house to purchase for an equestrian school and, as Edward used to work as an estate agent, he shows her several properties, making Freda jealous.

Edward lures Charlotte to his mansion late one night while Freda and the servant are out, where it is revealed that Charlotte is actually Dora. He admits killing her sister before trying to make her leave, however Freda returns home unexpectedly and escorts Charlotte to the door. After Charlotte drives away, Edward tells a horrified Freda that he killed Monica, secure in the knowledge that a wife cannot be compelled to testify against her husband and that he expects to inherit Charlotte's money, because he has tampered with the brakes on her car. He is shocked when Phillip enters the room, having heard his confession, followed by Charlotte herself. She had returned to the house after meeting the lawyer at the house entrance. Edward flees in his car, but the entrance is blocked, so he switches to another vehicle, only to realise too late that he has taken Charlotte's car. He loses control and drives over a cliff to his death.

== Cast ==
- Dirk Bogarde as Edward "Teddy" Bare
- Margaret Lockwood as Freda Jeffries
- Kay Walsh as Charlotte Young
- Kathleen Harrison as the Maid (Emily/Emmie)
- Robert Flemyng as Phillip Mortimer
- Mona Washbourne as Monica Bare
- Philip Stainton as Charlie Mann, a business associate of Edward
- Walter Hudd as the Coroner
- Lita Roza as a singer (her film debut)

== Production ==
The film was based on the play Murder Mistaken by Janet Green. Green wanted Dirk Bogarde to be in the play, but he declined, and Derek Farr played the role. When Lewis Gilbert was making The Sea Shall Not Have Them (1954), he saw the play and thought it would make a good film, and he persuaded Bogarde to play the lead.

Bogarde helped get Margaret Lockwood to co-star; "I was dubious about being able to play such a character, though I liked her honesty," said Lockwood.

Filming started at Elstree Studios on 12 April 1955 under the title Naked Flame. It was Gilbert's first production for his own company.

"I think it was an interesting plot, very claustrophobic," said Gilbert. "I think it was the best thing Margaret Lockwood did. She was great in the film."

Dirk Bogarde later said, "The unwholesomeness of the hero was what was fun about it."

== Reception ==
=== Box office ===
According to Kinematograph Weekly, the film was a "money maker" at the British box office in 1955. However, Dirk Bogarde said, "The film was a failure":

It was the first time I had come under another star's name – Margaret Lockwood – and it just died, which was a pity because it was a very good movie, and I had persuaded Maggie to do it. I remember being on tour in Cardiff with a play and I saw a poster for Cast a Dark Shadow, it had "Dirk Bogarde in Cast a Dark Shadow" and, at the very bottom, "with Margaret Lockwood". They altered the billing order because they saw it was dying and that, astoundingly, her name had killed it, though it was probably her best performance ever.

Lewis Gilbert later said, "It was reasonably successful but by then Margaret [Lockwood] had been in several bad films and her name on a picture was rather counter-productive." He said she got "wonderful notices" but it was "too late for her. She'd already lost her audience. The film just scraped home, we just made a profit."

After making the movie, Lockwood did not appear in a feature film for another 21 years. "I'm glad I did it, but am still wondering exactly where it got me," she said in 1973.

=== Critical reception ===
Monthly Film Bulletin wrote: "This is an old-fashioned and thorough-going melodrama, adapted from the stage and retaining – notably in the big scene in which Bare confronts his victim's sister – a decidedly theatrical flavour. It is conventionally but competently managed, achieving an occasional note of the authentically squalid and shabby in developing Bare's dealings with the three women. Although built up largely through mannerisms, Margaret Lockwood's performance as the retired barmaid has considerable spirit."

Bosley Crowther of The New York Times wrote that the actors are skilled but "they are not offered many opportunities to make Cast a Dark Shadow mysterious or tense."

Maclean's film reviewer Clyde Gilmour described the film as "[a] solid little murder thriller from Britain."

Halliwell's Film & Video Guide described the film as "[unambitious] but enjoyable melodrama, well acted though with directorial opportunities missed."

In British Sound Films: The Studio Years 1928–1959, David Quinlan rated the film as "good", writing, "Stagey thriller, played with panache."

The Radio Times Guide to Films gave the film 3/5 stars, writing: "After murdering his wife Mona Washbourne for her money, Dirk Bogarde marries canny Margaret Lockwood who proves less easy to dispose of. When he meets Kay Walsh, however, murder is back on the agenda. A modest but entertaining melodrama, directed by Lewis Gilbert with a stylish and proficient cast. Lockwood, who would return to the screen only once more two decades later, is particularly effective."

=== Home media ===
Cast a Dark Shadow was given a DVD commercial release by Simply Media in June 2015.
