= Relph =

Relph is an English surname. It is a variant of the surname Relf, which stems from the old French given name Riulf. The name was derived from Germanic words ric (power) and wulf (wolf). Notable people with the surname include:

- Edward Relph, Canadian geographer
- Emma Relph, British actress
- George Relph (1888–1960), English actor
- Little Tich (born Harry Relph; 1867–1928), English music hall comedian
- Jerry Relph (1944–2020), American politician
- Joseph Relph (1712–1743), English poet
- Michael Relph (1915–2004), English film producer and director
- Nick Relph (born 1979), British artist-filmmaker
- Pam Relph (born 1989), British Paralympic rower
- Simon Relph (1940–2016), British film producer and director
- Tyler Relph (born 1984), American basketball trainer and former player
- William Relph (1900–1978), English football forward
