= Mark McShane =

Australian author (1929–2013)

Mark McShane (28 November 1929 – 28 August 2013) was an Australian author best known for the novel Seance on a Wet Afternoon. The New York Times called McShane "another of the brighter authors to emerge in the 1960's... who invents wonderful titles."

He sometimes wrote under the name "Marc Lovell".

== Selected writings ==
=== Myra Savage Mystery ===
- Seance on a Wet Afternoon (1961) - filmed in 1964, 2000, and 2026
- Seance for Two (1972)

=== Norman Pink ===
- The Girl Nobody Knows (1965)
- Night's Evil (1966)
- The Way to Nowhere (1967)

=== Andrew Bailey Mystery (as Marc Lovell) ===
- A Presence in the House (1972)
- Hand Over Mind (1980)

=== Jason Galt Mystery (as Marc Lovell) ===
- The Blind Hypnotist (1976)
- The Second Vanetti Affair (1977)

=== Appleton Porter Mystery (as Marc Lovell) ===
- The Spy Game (1980)
- Spy On the Run (1982)
- The Spy With His Head in the Clouds (1982)
- Apple Spy in the Sky (1983) - filmed as The Trouble with Spies (1987)
- Apple to the Core (1983)
- How Green Was My Apple (1984)
- The Only Good Apple in a Barrel of Spies (1982)
- The Spy Who Got His Feet Wet (1985)
- Good Spies Don't Grow On Trees (1986)
- The Spy Who Barked In The Night (1986) - "Lovell's genius is his ability to write hilarious farce without losing either credibility or suspense"
- That Great Big Trenchcoat in the Sky (1988)
- The Spy Who Fell Off the Back of a Bus (1988)
- Ethel and the Naked Spy(1989)
- Comfort Me With Spies (1990)

=== Other novels ===
- The Straight and Crooked (1960) - first novel
- The Passing of Evil (1961) - filmed as The Grasshopper (1970)
- Untimely Ripped (1962)
- The Crimson Madness of Little Doom (1966)
- The Ghost of Megan (1968) (as Marc Lovell) aka The Memory of Megan
- Ill Met By a Fish Shop On George Street (1968)
- The Singular Case of the Multiple Dead (1970)
- The Imitation Thieves (1971) (as Marc Lovell)
- The Man Who Left Well Enough (1971)
- An Enquiry Into the Existence of Vampires (1974) (as Marc Lovell) aka Vampire in the Shadows
- Dreamers in a Haunted House (1975) (as Marc Lovell)
- Lashed But Not Leashed (1976)
- The Guardian Spectre (1977) (as Marc Lovell)
- Fog Sinister (1977) (as Marc Lovell)
- A Voice from the Living (1978) (as Marc Lovell)
- The Halcyon Way (1979)
- And They Say You Can't Buy Happiness (1979) (as Marc Lovell)
- The Hostage Game (1979)
- Shadows and Dark Places (1980) (as Marc Lovell)
- The Last Seance (1982) (as Marc Lovell)
- Looking for Kingford (1983) (as Marc Lovell)
- Just a Face in the Dark (1987)
- Once Upon a Fairy Tale (1990)
- Mourning Becomes the Hangman (1991)
- The Fourth Nail (2002)
- The Man Who Made Love (2003)
