= Sam Staples =

English cricketer

Personal information
- Full name: Samuel James Staples
- Batting: Right-handed
- Bowling: Right-arm offbreak

International information
- National side: England
- Test debut: 21 January 1928 v South Africa
- Last Test: 4 February 1928 v South Africa

Career statistics
Competition	Test	First-class
Matches	3	385
Runs scored	65	6,470
Batting average	13.00	17.02
100s/50s	0/0	1/19
Top score	39	110
Balls bowled	1,149	75,609
Wickets	15	1,331
Bowling average	29.00	22.85
5 wickets in innings	0	72
10 wickets in match	0	11
Best bowling	3/50	9/141
Catches/stumpings	0/–	335/–
- Source: CricInfo, 2 August 2020

Samuel James Staples (18 September 1892 – 4 June 1950) was an English cricketer who played first-class cricket for Nottinghamshire in the 1920s and early 1930s. He played in three Tests for England against South Africa in 1927–28. He would have toured Australia in 1928–29 but his health broke down before the tour began.

However, as a stock bowler for Nottinghamshire, Staples was an essential part of their successful team in the 1920s because his long spells of accurate medium-pace bowling allowed speedster Harold Larwood and the physically sensitive Tich Richmond to be more effective. Although on a relatively few occasions his off-break from round the wicket could be quite unplayable, Staples rarely obtained exceptional averages even in helpful summers but there is unlikely that without his ability to keep more penetrative bowlers fresh, Nottinghamshire's bowling would have been less formidable.

== Biography ==
Born on 18 September 1892, Newstead Colliery, Nottinghamshire, Staples first played for Nottinghamshire in 1920. Though he accomplished a few good performances such as 6 for 81 against the great Surrey batting side at The Oval, it was though he had little sting, and although he obtained a permanent place in 1921 and took 76 wickets, there was still little to suggest a significant career. Although in 1922, Staples bowled very well at times (notably four quick wickets to round off a brilliant win over Yorkshire) and made 85 not out in a last wicket stand of 140 with Richmond, he did not establish a reputation as a major force in the game until 1923, when his bowling gave Yorkshire its only defeat in the Championship and he took almost 100 wickets. In addition, he surprised everyone by making 110 against Surrey in the August Bank Holiday match.

However, the appalling summer of 1924 brought a setback with Staples averaging 23 runs a wicket on very favourable pitches. In 1925, though his average was much higher than the other Nottinghamshire bowlers (Richmond, Larwood and Barratt) his workload was a vital factor in the team's success, and this trend continued throughout 1926, when Staples took 113 wickets. 1927, with Nottinghamshire missing the Championship due to a remarkable loss in their last game to previously winless Glamorgan, saw Staples have his best season with 132 wickets including 9 for 141 against Kent in a game where Carr put Kent into bat but the pitch proved easy. Because the matting wickets were suited to a medium-paced off-spinner like Staples, he was chosen to visit South Africa. He played in the last three matches of the five-Test series, taking 15 wickets. In 1928 Staples bowled so well that his persistence and accuracy were seen as great assets on the cast-iron Australian pitches, but illness prevented him touring and restricted his cricket somewhat in 1929, when he only just reached 100 wickets.

Although he just failed to reach three-figures in the wet summer of 1930, Staples was still a force with the ball as shown when he took 7 for 24 on a sticky wicket against Leicestershire at Trent Bridge. However, in 1931 a car accident kept him out of most of Nottinghamshire's later programme and the team's bowling was very weak without him and Larwood. 1932 opened with a sensational 10 for 21 against Hampshire and saw Staples on the whole bowling better than ever, so that it was a surprise when after 1933 Staples decided to retire to coach the team. He did play one match as captain in 1934 when Arthur Carr was not able to play.

After World War II, Sam Staples became coach to Hampshire until 1949. He then spent the 1949 season on the list of first-class umpires but resigned after the season due to ill-health. He died shortly afterwards at the age of 57.

Sporting positions
Preceded by Robert Relf 1930; None 1931–1938	Hampshire cricket coach 1939–1949	Succeeded by Arthur Holt
