= Séance (2000 film) =

2000 film

- Theatrical release poster
- Based on: Séance on a Wet Afternoon by Mark McShane
- Written by: Kiyoshi Kurosawa; Tetsuya Onishi
- Directed by: Kiyoshi Kurosawa
- Starring: Kōji Yakusho; Jun Fubuki; Tsuyoshi Kusanagi
- Country of origin: Japan
- Original language: Japanese

Production
- Producers: Atsuyuki Shimoda; Takehiko Tanaka; Yasuyuki Uemura
- Cinematography: Takahide Shibanushi
- Editor: Jun'ichi Kikuchi
- Running time: 97 minutes
- Budget: approx $200,000–$300,000 (US)

Original release
- Release: May 12, 2001

Séance (Japanese: 降霊, Hepburn: Kōrei) is a 2000 Japanese television horror film directed and co-written by Kiyoshi Kurosawa, based on the 1961 novel Séance on a Wet Afternoon by Mark McShane. The novel had previously been adapted in a 1964 British film of the same name.

It stars Kōji Yakusho, Jun Fubuki and Tsuyoshi Kusanagi, and follows the married couple of Koji and Junko, the latter being a psychic that can communicate with spirits. It premiered in Switzerland on August 7, 2000, and on May 12, 2001 in Japan.

== Plot ==
Koji Sato is a mild-mannered sound technician who is married to Junko, a waitress who possesses powerful psychic abilities. Though these abilities allow her to see and communicate with spirits, they interfere in her day-to-day life and make it difficult for her to hold down a normal job. She hopes to build a business around her psychic powers, but faces a daunting task of proving her abilities to a skeptical world. When Hayakawa, a young graduate student in psychology, invites her into a study of the paranormal, she leaps at the ability to demonstrate her skill as a medium.

Through Hayakawa, Junko becomes involved with the police search for a young girl kidnapped by a deranged ex-cop. But through a bizarre coincidence, the young girl escapes her captor and takes refuge in Koji's equipment case, unbeknownst to him. When the couple discover the unconscious child at their home, they devise a plan to keep her hidden, while Junko gradually leads the police to her. They reason that this will prove Junko's psychic abilities to the public, and also ensure that they are not falsely blamed for the kidnapping.

The plan quickly goes awry, however, and an accident leads to the child's death. Afterwards, Koji and Junko must try to hide their involvement in the girl's death, while being haunted by her angry spirit.

== Cast ==
- Kōji Yakusho as Koji Sato
- Jun Fubuki as Junko Sato
- Tsuyoshi Kusanagi as Hayakawa
- Ittoku Kishibe as college professor
- Show Aikawa as Shinto priest

== Production ==
Director and co-writer Kiyoshi Kurosawa was approached by the Kansai Telecasting Corporation with the idea of adapting Mark McShane's novel Seance on a Wet Afternoon. In a 2005 interview, Kurosawa explained, "What interested me about the narrative story in the book was that it featured a ghost, in other words, a dead human being, as well as an average couple who had been living very normal lives who, in fact, became criminals. These are the two elements of the original novel that interested me." When he made the film, Kurosawa had no idea the novel had already been adapted into a 1964 film directed by Bryan Forbes and starring Richard Attenborough and Kim Stanley. Eventually having seen it, he commented, "I thought it was very interesting. I thought it was fairly faithful to the original novel" (which does not have any literal ghosts in it, as opposed to Kurosawa's version).

Though the film was specifically made for Japanese television, Kurosawa shot it on film. In a 2001 interview, he recalled, "I was actually hoping for film festivals to ask me to come show this film and thankfully that was what happened. But this is not the normal situation for a tv drama." He claims that he "shot it as a film," and that working for television was not particularly different from his usual work style except that, "The only thing was that I couldn't use shocking scenes. It has to be more quiet. There aren't a lot of people dying, because that's not allowed [on television]."

On the casting of Kōji Yakusho (who has appeared in many of Kurosawa's films) Kurosawa commented, "First of all, I think he is a great actor. He can play any type of character. He can be a regular guy, but he can also become a monster, a person of whom you don't know what he's thinking. Secondly, he is the same age as me. So our points of view are alike. We're on the same level as human beings. As to the casting of another frequent collaborator, Show Aikawa, Kurosawa explained, "...this bit of casting was very funny. In Japan, people can't think of him as a Shinto priest, as an exorcist. Aikawa-san is a yakuza movie star, so people only think of him as a yakuza. In real life, he is the opposite. He is a total gentleman. So I wanted to show Japanese people that he is not like a yakuza at all."

The film was shot in two weeks, on what Kurosawa describes as a low budget (around $200,000 to $300,000 US dollars).

== Reception ==
The film was well-received by critics. Derek Elley of Variety wrote, "Seance, made for TV but looking just fine on the bigscreen, will please the cult director’s fans and maybe make some more as well. Though not on the tenebrous level of Cure, it's an entertaining ride." Nicholas Rucka of Midnight Eye agreed, writing, "Suffice it to say that while Séance is not as strong as Cure, in my book, it is a good piece and certainly better than most of the recent horror fare in Japan and abroad."

On the review aggregator website Rotten Tomatoes, 80% of five critics' reviews are positive.
