= Albert Relf =

English cricketer

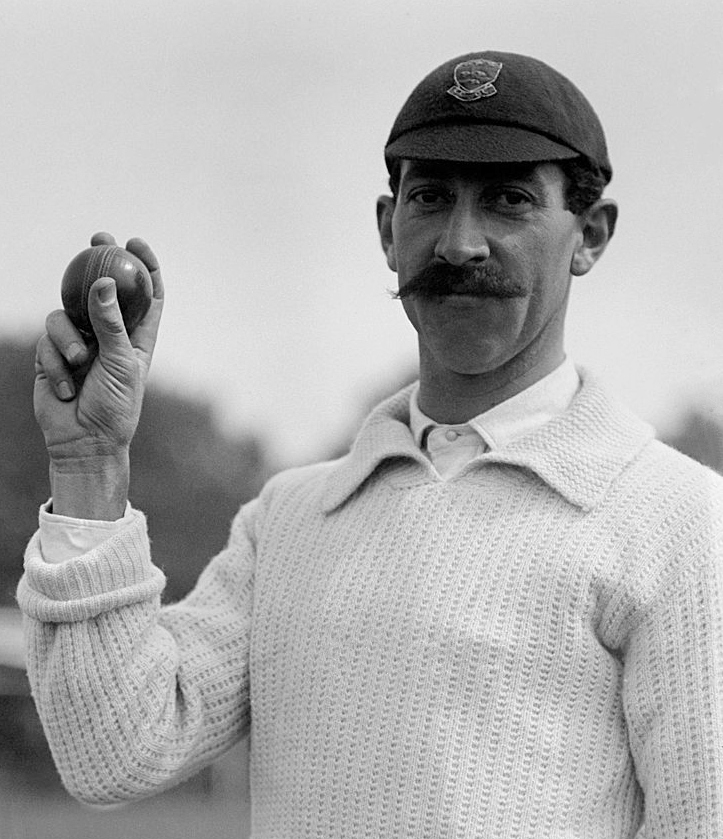
- Albert Relf in about 1905

Personal information
- Born: 26 June 1874; Burwash, East Sussex, England
- Died: 26 March 1937 (aged 52); Wellington College, Berkshire, England
- Batting: Right-handed
- Bowling: Right-arm medium

International information
- National side: England
- Test debut: 11 December 1903 v Australia
- Last Test: 27 February 1914 v South Africa

Career statistics
Competition	Test	First-class
Matches	13	565
Runs scored	416	22,238
Batting average	23.11	26.79
100s/50s	0/1	26/112
Top score	63	189*
Balls bowled	1,764	108,193
Wickets	25	1897
Bowling average	24.96	20.94
5 wickets in innings	1	114
10 wickets in match	0	23
Best bowling	5/85	9/95
Catches/stumpings	14/–	535/–
- Source: ESPNcricinfo, 24 August 2024

Albert Edward Relf (26 June 1874 – 26 March 1937) was a professional cricketer who played for Sussex and England.

Relf was an all-rounder who batted in the middle order and bowled off-breaks at medium pace with great accuracy. Gilbert Jessop described him as “the master of the swerve”. He played Minor Counties cricket for Norfolk, a coaching engagement with the Earl of Wilton at Houghton Hall gaining him a residential qualification. At the age of 25, he returned to Sussex to play for the county of his birth, initially enjoying mixed success. At first he played as a batsman who bowled a bit, his bowling developed in 1903 to the point where he was picked for the Marylebone Cricket Club (MCC) tour to Australia under Plum Warner. He played in two Tests, helping Tip Foster add 115 for the ninth wicket in his first match at Sydney.

Most of Relf's 13-match Test career, though, was played on two tours to South Africa in 1905–06 and 1913–14, and he played only once against Australia in England, taking five wickets for 85 in a total of 350 at Lord's in 1909, but then being dropped to accommodate Sydney Barnes for the remainder of the series. In the first Test at Johannesburg in 1905–06, he bowled the ball, allegedly down the leg-side, that enabled South Africa to record the first-ever victory over England. Warner, again his captain, was reported to have sighed: "Oh, Albert. How could you?"

In county cricket, Relf was prolific, achieving the "double" of 1000 runs and 100 wickets eight times, with a best in 1913 of 1846 runs and 141 wickets. He was a Wisden Cricketer of the Year in 1914, where it was said of his batting style: "No one seeing him for the first time would suppose him capable of getting his hundreds in high-class company," Wisden said. "He has a way of letting the ball hit the bat that is certainly not impressive to the eye. Still, the fact remains, that season after season he makes as many runs as men who look twice as good as he is."

He coached in Auckland from 1907–08 to 1909–10. Writing in the 1940s, Dan Reese said, "He was the best cricket coach we have had in New Zealand, being most thorough in his methods and making his young players work at the game." Relf also played eight first-class matches for Auckland, scoring 633 runs at 52.75 and taking 53 wickets at 11.79. Auckland were unbeaten in the Plunket Shield during Relf's tenure.

Relf played on after the First World War, scoring 153 against Leicestershire at Horsham in his final season, 1921. He was awarded a benefit game (v Leicestershire) in 1921. The funds raised included the generous donation of 100 guineas by his former captain, KL Ranjitsinhji. By this time, Relf's appearances were limited as he had succeeded his father as cricket coach at Wellington College, and he played later for Berkshire in the Minor Counties.

Relf shot himself at Wellington, apparently depressed by the illness of his wife. He left the considerable estate for the time of £20,880.

His two younger brothers, Robert and Ernest, also played first-class cricket.
