= The League of Gentlemen (film) =

1960 British film by Basil Dearden

- The film's British quad poster
- Directed by: Basil Dearden
- Screenplay by: Bryan Forbes
- Based on: The League of Gentlemen a 1958 novel by John Boland
- Produced by: Michael Relph
- Starring: Jack Hawkins; Nigel Patrick; Roger Livesey; Richard Attenborough
- Cinematography: Arthur Ibbetson
- Edited by: John D. Guthridge
- Music by: Philip Green
- Production company: AFM Productions Ltd
- Distributed by: British Lion Films
- Release date: 5 April 1960
- Running time: 116 minutes
- Country: United Kingdom
- Language: English
- Budget: £192,000 or £179,602

The League of Gentlemen is a 1960 British heist action comedy film directed by Basil Dearden and starring Jack Hawkins, Nigel Patrick, Roger Livesey and Richard Attenborough. It is based on John Boland's 1958 novel of the same name, and features a screenplay written by Bryan Forbes, who also co-starred in the film.

In the film, former officers of the British Army plan a bank robbery in the City of London. They raid an army training camp in Dorset to get the weapons they need, and frame the Irish Republican Army (IRA) for the raid.

== Plot ==
Lieutenant Colonel Norman Hyde prepares seven envelopes, each containing an American crime paperback titled The Golden Fleece, one half of each of ten £5-notes, and an invitation to a lunch at the Cafe Royal hosted by "Co-Operative Removals Ltd." He then sends the envelopes to former army officers in desperate or humiliating circumstances. The officers attend the lunch to get the other halves of their £5-notes and show little enthusiasm for the novel. Their interest is piqued when Hyde reveals knowledge of why each officer was discharged from the military:

- Major Peter Race, a retired Major suspected of running a black-market ring and running underground games.
- Major Rupert Rutland-Smith, a heavily indebted former Major married to a wealthy socialite.
- Captain "Padre" Mycroft, a former military officer who later became a priest (later defrocked) dismissed for public gross indecency.
- Lieutenant Edward Lexy, a former Royal Corp of Signals officer dismissed for selling secrets to the Russians who rigs poker machines.
- Captain Martin Porthill, a former army marksman dismissed for shooting suspected members of the EOKA Greek nationalist group in Cyprus.
- Captain Stevens, a former member of the British Union of Fascists and army officer dismissed for lewd conduct.
- Captain Frank Weaver, a former bomb disposal officer who resigned after attempting to disarm a bomb while drunk, resulting in four deaths.

Although he has no criminal record himself, Hyde holds a grudge for being made redundant by the army after 25 years of service and intends to rob a bank using the skills of the gathered men, promising each at least £100,000.

The gang discusses the plan in greater detail under the guise of an amateur dramatic society rehearsal and move into Hyde's house where they live like a military unit, complete with a regimen of duties and discipline in the form of monetary fines between £100 and £500 to be deducted from the robbery proceeds. Hyde reveals he's spent a year tracking deliveries of used banknotes to a City of London bank. The gang raids an army training camp in Dorset to obtain weapons posing as senior officers on an unscheduled food inspection and telephone repairmen, using Irish accents to cast suspicion on the Irish Republican Army. Extensive planning is carried out in Hyde's basement and a rented warehouse, which arouses the suspicions of a passing policeman. On the eve of the bank robbery, Hyde destroys the plans and thanks the men for their hard work.

Using smoke bombs, Sterling submachine guns, and radio jamming equipment, the gang raids a bank near St Paul's, seizes the money, and escapes without harming any bystanders. The celebration at Hyde's house is interrupted by the unexpected arrival of Hyde's former military commander, "Bunny" Warren. Hyde plies Bunny with liquor and the members of the gang leave individually with their filled suitcases of loot.

When Superintendent Wheatlock telephones, the last remaining gang member, Race, tries to escape out the back. Hyde learns that the car registration number spotted outside the bank has been matched to one noted by the policeman at the warehouse, implicating Hyde. Hyde and Bunny walk out the front door into the glare of searchlights and a small army of police officers and soldiers. Hyde is escorted to a police van and finds the rest of his gang already inside.

== Cast ==
- Jack Hawkins as Lieutenant-Colonel Norman Hyde
- Nigel Patrick as Major Peter Race
- Roger Livesey as Captain "Padre" Mycroft
- Richard Attenborough as Lieutenant Edward Lexy
- Bryan Forbes as Captain Martin Porthill
- Kieron Moore as Captain Stevens
- Terence Alexander as Major Rupert Rutland-Smith
- Norman Bird as Captain Frank Weaver
- Robert Coote as Brigadier "Bunny" Warren
- Melissa Stribling as Peggy, who ran a gambling parlour with Race
- Nanette Newman as Elizabeth Rutland-Smith
- Lydia Sherwood as Hilda, Porthill's wealthy, older girlfriend
- Doris Hare as Molly Weaver
- David Lodge as Company Sergeant Major Barnard
- Patrick Wymark as Wylie, the customer at Lexy's repair shop
- Gerald Harper as Captain Saunders, the adjutant of the army base
- Brian Murray as Private "Chunky" Grogan

Uncredited

- Marie Burke as Mrs. Boyle, Mycroft's landlady
- Dinsdale Landen as the boxer in Stevens' gym
- Michael Corcoran as Stevens's blackmailer
- Oliver Reed as a Babes in the Woods chorus boy
- Anthony Wager as the switchboard operator at the army base
- Patrick Jordan as an army sergeant
- Norman Rossington as Staff Sergeant Hall
- Bruce Seton as the AA patrolman
- Terence Edmond as the young police constable at the warehouse
- Ronald Leigh-Hunt as Superintendent Wheatlock

== Production ==
=== Development ===
In November 1958 film rights to the novel were bought by Carl Foreman. He wanted to cast five stars in the leads and hoped for Cary Grant, James Mason, Trevor Howard, Jack Hawkins, John Mills, Michael Redgrave and/or Richard Burton. Foreman commissioned Bryan Forbes to write the script. Forbes said he wrote three different drafts. Cary Grant was offered the part of Hyde, but turned it down. Forbes said David Niven also turned it down. The writer claims that Foreman put his own name on the script, not Forbes', arguing that the project would be more likely to get up with Foreman's name on it.

Richard Todd claims he turned down a lead role although it was unclear at what stage this happened.

Foreman sold the rights to the script to the team of Michael Relph and Basil Dearden. They decided to form Allied Film Makers, a filmmaking co-operative with other partners: Jack Hawkins and his brother, and Bryan Forbes and Richard Attenborough. Forbes says when he met Dearden, the director wanted Hawkins to play the lead. League was the first film from Allied. The company was supported by the National Provincial Bank and the Rank Organisation. The NFFC provided a completion guarantee for this film but Rank did it for AFM's next five movies in exchange for a 27.5% distribution fee.

=== Shooting ===
Filming began in November 1959. Forbes later wrote in his memoirs, "I think we all sensed that we were making a good film. Far from being a dictator on the set, Basil almost went to the other extreme: never could actors have been treated with such respect, and the atmosphere was relaxed and carefree for most of the time. My qualification is deliberate, for unbeknown to most the tragedy of Jack’s career was creeping ever nearer." During filming, Jack Hawkins began to experience voice trouble which resulted in him falling ill for a few days. This an early sign of the throat cancer that would ultimately lead to the loss of his voice and his death.

The portrait of Hyde's wife is a close copy of a portrait of Deborah Kerr that was created for The Life and Death of Colonel Blimp (1943), which stars Roger Livesey (who plays Mycroft in The League) in the title role. Forbes points out in his DVD commentary for The League that, in most films of the time, Hyde's wife would be described as dead, rather than dismissed with a comment such as Hyde's that "I regret to say the bitch is still going strong."

After Hyde leaves the lunch party, there are two scenes in the script that did not make it into the finished film. In the first, Weaver, although reminded by Lexy that he is a teetotaler, drinks some brandy. In the second, Hyde, followed by Race, visits a teenage girl at school, who, as her photo is also on Hyde's desk, is implied to be his daughter.

Queens Gate Place Mews, SW7, was used as the filming location for Lexy's repair shop.

The erotic magazines in Mycroft's suitcase at the beginning of the film were borrowed from the set of Peeping Tom (1960), which was being filmed at Pinewood Studios at the same time as The League.

The League of Gentlemen was mentioned in the film The Wrong Arm of the Law (1963) as one of the films that "Pearly" Gates (Peter Sellers) was going to show his gang of crooks as a part of his training programme.

== Reception ==
=== Box office ===
The film was a financial success. It was the sixth most popular film at the UK box office in 1960, and it had earned a profit of £250,000 by 1971. Over 20 years later, Bryan Forbes estimated the profit at between £300,000 and £400,000.

=== Critical ===
Variety called it a "smooth piece of teamwork".

The Monthly Film Bulletin wrote:

Given a slightly different approach, this film might have developed into an ironic study of the decline of the officer class in peacetime; a valid enough subject, especially when one considers the varying shifts in social status to be encountered in the post-war British scene. Instead, the film concentrates on suspense rather than character investigation. Each of the Gentlemen is introduced by a little establishing scene, after which the script fails to develop their idiosyncracies and, in fact, weakens its own possibilities by making them all basically shady characters. Bryan Forbes (as in his script for The Angry Silence (1960)) brings a lively surface edge to the dialogue, but tends to overdo the slick, ripe repartee as well as imposing on his characters a variety of fashionable perversions. As a study of a certain strata of society, then, the film lacks a strong centre and a firm point of view – one is never quite sure how seriously the parody of the officer code is intended, especially in the ambiguous, obligatorily moral ending. Judged as a thriller, it is more successful: the two big set-pieces (the army camp robbery and the raid itself) are quite skilfully put together, although the former suffers from an overdose of tired Army humour. The handling of these scenes and the extensive location shooting suggest that, for Basil Dearden, the film's interest (and challenge) was mainly a technical one. In any case, it is his sharpest, most alive film for several years with rather less of his customary, mechanical shockcutting. The players, on the other hand, are often forced by the script's limitations to fall back on familiar mannerisms – Jack Hawkins is altogether too smooth and heavy and Nigel Patrick's oily bounder brings no revelation. Roger Livesey has some dry moments as a spurious officer doing the rounds whilst Robert Coote's drunken intervention enlivens the somewhat anti-climactic climax.

At the time of its American release, Bosley Crowther of The New York Times called the film "neatly written and expertly played", and said it features "a devilishly inventive and amusing screen play by Mr. Forbes" and "is directed crisply and spinningly by Basil Dearden".

The Daily Telegraph has called the film "a masterpiece of British cinema". Dennis Schwartz called it "a fine example of old-fashioned English humor: droll and civil." Time Out called it "A terrific caper movie ... with typically excellent character playing from a lovable set of old lags."

The Radio Times Guide to Films gave the film 4/5 stars, writing: "This was the first feature from the Allied Film Makers company, with most of its founder members – producer Michael Relph, director Basil Dearden, screenwriter Bryan Forbes and actors Jack Hawkins and Richard Attenborough – making solid contributions to this rousing crime caper. Dating from a time when every third word a crook said didn't begin with an 'f', this distant ancestor of such bungled heist pics as Reservoir Dogs gets off to a rather stodgy start, but, once Hawkins has assembled his far from magnificent seven and his intricate plan begins to unravel, the action really hots up."

Leslie Halliwell said: "Delightfully handled comedy adventure, from the days (alas) when crime did not pay; a lighter ending would have made it a classic."

Alexander Walker wrote that the film "was a more wry, disenchanted kind of comedy than Ealing would have made, though it was visibly an off-shoot of that same tradition. It maintained Ealing’s unflagging belief that the amateurs could outwit the experts, the irregulars could defeat the authorities; and the aggressive band of shady customers, all keeping up a pretence of respectability under Supremo Jack Hawkins, appeared in retrospect to be mirroring Britain’s buoyant, acquisitive society in the 1960s."

Filmink argued that the film "is solid fun, a sort of Ealing movie with a little more cynicism and sexiness (e.g. Forbes’ wife, Nanette Newman, lounging in a bath), though it hadn't entirely shed Ealing's smugness or respect for law and order."

== Home media ==
The League of Gentlemen was included, along with three other Dearden films, in The Criterion Collection's 2010 Eclipse Series box set "Basil Dearden’s London Underground".

In 2006, a restored version of the film was released as a special edition DVD in the UK. The extras on this release include a South Bank Show documentary on Attenborough and a PDF version of Forbes' original script. An audio commentary for the film was provided by Forbes and his wife, Nanette Newman, who portrays Major Rutland-Smith's wife in the film.

== Remake ==
In September 2025, Dexter Fletcher was revealed to be directing a modern-day remake of the film for Paramount Pictures.

== Notes ==
- Forbes, Bryan (1974). Notes for a life. Collins.
