= John Boland (author) =

English writer (1913–1976)

- Born: Bertram John Boland; 12 February 1913; Birmingham, England
- Died: 9 November 1976 (aged 63)
- Occupations: Novelist, author
- Writing career
- Genre: Science fiction

Bertram John Boland (12 February 1913 – 9 November 1976) was an English novelist and science fiction author.

Boland was born in Birmingham, but later lived in East Sussex, on the edge of Ashdown Forest with his wife, Philippa.
His most well known book was The League of Gentlemen (1958) which was released as a film. However, characters' names and the ending were changed. He wrote two sequels:

- The Gentlemen Reform (1961)
- The Gentlemen at Large (1962)

They continued with the characterisations developed in the film.

His first novel "White August" (1955) was a science fiction weather control disaster story. His second, "No Refuge" (1956) begins as a bank robbery crime story but them changes into science fiction, depicting a futuristic lost world. In this world children get much of their education from computers and adults walk around with a small device on their chest, listening to music through earpieces.

As well as novels, he published short stories in science fiction magazines, including Galaxy Science Fiction and New Worlds.

Boland was closely involved with Swanwick writers' summer school becoming its chairman in 1958

== Bibliography ==
=== Fiction ===
- White August (Michael Joseph: 1955)
- No Refuge (Michael Joseph: 1956)
- Queer Fish (Boardman: 1958)
- The League of Gentlemen (Boardman: 1958)
- Mysterious Way (Boardman: 1959)
- Operation Red Carpet (Boardman: 1959)
- Bitter Fortune (Boardman: 1959)
- The Midas Touch (Boardman: 1960)
- Negative Value (Boardman: 1960)
- The Gentlemen Reform (Boardman: 1961)
- Inside Job (Boardman: 1961)
- The Golden Fleece (Boardman: 1961)
- Vendetta (Boardman: 1961)
- The Gentlemen at Large (Boardman: 1962)
- Fatal Error (Boardman: 1962)
- Counterpol (Harrap: 1963)
- The Catch (Harrap: 1964)
- Counterpol in Paris (Harrap: 1964)
- The Good Citizens (Harrap: 1965)
- The Disposal Unit (Harrap: 1966)
- The Gusher (Harrap: 1967)
- Painted Lady (Cassell: 1967)
- Breakdown (Cassell: 1968)
- The Fourth Grave (Cassell: 1969)
- The Shakespeare Curse (Cassell: 1969)
- Kidnap (Cassell: 1970)
- The Big Job (Cassell: 1970)
- The Trade of Kings (Forest House: 1972)
- Holocaust (Futura: 1974)

=== Nonfiction ===
- Free-Lance Journalism
- Short Story Writing
