= Michael Relph =

British film maker (1915–2004)

- Born: Michael Leighton George Relph; 16 February 1915; Broadstone, Dorset, England
- Died: 30 September 2004 (aged 89); Selsey, West Sussex, England
- Occupations: Film producer; art director; screenwriter; film director

Michael Leighton George Relph (16 February 1915 – 30 September 2004) was an English film producer, art director, screenwriter and film director. He was the son of actor George Relph.

== Films ==
Relph began his film career in 1933 as an assistant art director under Alfred Junge at Gaumont British then headed by Michael Balcon. In 1942, Relph began work at Ealing as chief art director, where his designs included the influential 1945 supernatural anthology Dead of Night.

He worked mainly on Basil Dearden's films, and in 1949 was nominated for an Academy Award for art direction for his work on the Stewart Granger vehicle Saraband for Dead Lovers (1948).

== Theatre ==
Michael Relph also designed for the theatre, particularly the West End in the 1940s, including The Doctor's Dilemma, A Month in the Country, and The Man Who Came to Dinner.

== Producer ==
Relph is largely known as a film producer. He served as associate producer on the Ealing comedy Kind Hearts and Coronets (1949); and had a significant 20-year partnership with Basil Dearden beginning in 1949 and ending with Dearden's death in 1971. Their work included a series of social problem films examining issues such as racism (Pool of London and Sapphire), juvenile delinquency (Violent Playground), homosexuality (Victim), and religious intolerance (Life for Ruth). Relph believed that because film was "genuinely a mass medium," it therefore had "social and educative responsibilities as well as artistic ones."

In their review of Life For Ruth, The New York Times wrote, "in avoiding blatant bias, mawkish sentimentality and theatrical flamboyance, it makes a statement that is dramatic, powerful and provocative."

Relph also directed some movies. It has been argued he was not as skilled a director as a producer.

From 1972 to 1979, Relph was chairman of the British Film Institute's Production Board. Simultaneously he was the Chairman of the Film Production Association of Great Britain, and went on to be Head of Production for Boyd's Company in the 1980s, where he helped foster the emerging talents of Derek Jarman (The Tempest) and Julien Temple (The Great Rock 'n' Roll Swindle).

== Family ==
His son, Simon Relph, was also a film producer and former chairman of BAFTA. His daughter, Emma Relph, had several parts on television and in the films as an actress during the 1980s. His stepson Mark Law is a former Fleet Street journalist and author of The Pyjama Game, A Journey Into Judo.

== Selected filmography ==
Year	Title	Director	Producer	Writer
1952	I Believe in You	Yes	Yes	Yes
1955	Out of the Clouds	No	Yes	Yes
1955	The Ship That Died of Shame	No	Yes	Yes
1957	Rockets Galore!	Yes	No	No
1957	Davy	Yes	No	No
1959	Desert Mice	Yes	No	Yes
1960	Man in the Moon	No	Yes	Yes
1963	A Place to Go	No	Yes	Yes
1964	Woman of Straw	No	Yes	Yes
1965	Masquerade	No	Yes	Yes
1968	The Assassination Bureau	No	Yes	Yes
1970	The Man Who Haunted Himself	No	Yes	Yes

Producer

- The Captive Heart (1946)
- Frieda (1947)
- Saraband for Dead Lovers (1948)
- Kind Hearts and Coronets (1949)
- Train of Events (1949)
- The Blue Lamp (1950)
- Cage of Gold (1950)
- Pool of London (1951)
- The Gentle Gunman (1952)
- The Square Ring (1953)
- The Rainbow Jacket (1954)
- Who Done It? (1956)
- The Smallest Show on Earth (1957)
- Violent Playground (1958)
- Sapphire (1959)
- The League Of Gentlemen (1960)
- Victim (1961)
- The Secret Partner (1961)
- All Night Long (1961)
- Life for Ruth (1962)
- The Mind Benders (1963)
- Scum (1979)
- An Unsuitable Job for a Woman (1982)
- Heavenly Pursuits (1986)
- Torrents of Spring (1989) (production consultant)

Art director

- They Drive by Night (1938)
- Went the Day Well? (1942) (assistant)
- The Bells Go Down (1943)
- My Learned Friend (1943)
- Champagne Charlie (1944)
- My Learned Friend (1943)
- The Halfway House (1944)
- They Came to a City (1944)
- Dead of Night (1945)
- The Life and Adventures of Nicholas Nickleby (1947)
- The Captive Heart (1946)

Production designer

- Frieda (1947)
- Saraband for Dead Lovers (1948)
- Cage of Gold (1950)
- All Night Long (1961)
- The Assassination Bureau (1968)
