= Sapphire (film) =

1959 film directed by Basil Dearden

- UK release poster
- Directed by: Basil Dearden
- Written by: Janet Green
- Produced by: Michael Relph; Earl St. John (executive producer)
- Starring: Nigel Patrick; Yvonne Mitchell; Michael Craig; Paul Massie
- Cinematography: Harry Waxman
- Edited by: John D. Guthridge
- Music by: Philip Green
- Production company: Artna Films
- Distributed by: Rank Film Distributors
- Release date: 21 April 1959 (United Kingdom)
- Running time: 92 minutes
- Country: United Kingdom
- Language: English
- Budget: £140,000 or $400,000
- Box office: over $1 million (US)

Sapphire is a 1959 British crime drama film directed by Basil Dearden and starring Nigel Patrick, Yvonne Mitchell, Michael Craig, and Paul Massie. A progressive film for its time, it focuses on racism in London toward immigrants from the West Indies, and explores the "underlying insecurities and fears of ordinary people" about those of another race.

Producer Michael Relph later said "it looks dated now because of the changes in race relations since then, but it was a good film at the time. It was very successful in America."

== Plot ==
Children playing on Hampstead Heath in London come across the body of a young light-skinned woman who has been stabbed to death. Police Superintendent Robert Hazard and his assistant, Inspector Phil Learoyd, follow the lead of the woman's handkerchief, monogrammed with an "S," and discover that her name was Sapphire Robbins, a music student. Her brother, a doctor working in Birmingham, is notified. Her fiance, an architecture student named David Harris, claims to have been in Cambridge at the time of the murder.

An autopsy reveals that Sapphire had been three months pregnant. The police are surprised when Dr. Robbins arrives and they see that he is black. He and his sister were mixed race, but Sapphire was able to "pass" as white. Robbins is professional in his bearing and proud, sceptical that the police will actually try to solve his sister's murder.

Investigating Sapphire's life and acquaintances, the officers find that she frequented nightclubs with black clienteles, leading them to look for another possible boyfriend. Learoyd is quick to jump to racist assumptions about the victim's behaviour, but Hazard is nonjudgemental and sometimes counters his assistant's biased views. Interviews with other possible witnesses or connections to the case reveal a range of racist attitudes in the white population.

When the officers question members of David's family, they learn that Sapphire had revealed her family background to David, and had informed his parents and adult sister Mildred about the pregnancy. David's father had reluctantly agreed to David and Sapphire marrying despite his own racist views and the family's concern about their social standing, as well as the knowledge that David would probably have to forfeit an upcoming scholarship to study in Rome.

Visiting Tulip's Club, a nightclub favoured by affluent young blacks, Hazard and Learoyd learn that Sapphire was resented by some of her contemporaries, but that she often went there with a young man called "Johnnie Fiddle". After a chase, Johnnie is caught and brought in by the police. A knife and a bloody shirt are discovered in his room, but Johnnie claims these were from a fight he had with a certain "Horace Big Cigar". In the meantime, however, David is seen acting suspiciously near the murder scene on Hampstead Heath, and it is discovered that he had returned from Cambridge earlier than he claimed on the day of the murder.

Hoping to prod further revelations from those closest to the murder, Hazard brings Dr. Robbins to the Harris home, prompting angry reactions from the family. The most violent comes from Mildred, who responds with disgust when Robbins picks up one of her daughter's toys. Mildred finally confesses to her hatred of Sapphire and to the murder. With the case wrapped up, Hazard acknowledges the larger social evils underlying the case, telling Learoyd that they "didn't solve anything... We just picked up the pieces."

== Cast ==
- Nigel Patrick as Superintendent Robert Hazard
- Yvonne Mitchell as Mildred Farr (née Harris)
- Michael Craig as Inspector Phil Learoyd
- Paul Massie as David Harris
- Bernard Miles as Mr. Ted Harris
- Olga Lindo as Mrs. Harris
- Earl Cameron as Dr. Robbins
- Gordon Heath as Paul Slade
- Jocelyn Britton as Patsy
- Harry Baird as "Johnnie Fiddle"
- Orlando Martins as the barman at Tulip's Club
- Rupert Davies as Constable Jack Ferris
- Freda Bamford as Sergeant Cook
- Robert Adams as "Horace Big Cigar"
- Yvonne Buckingham as Sapphire Robbins

Uncredited

- Desmond Llewelyn as a police inspector
- Richard Vernon as the medical official at the crime scene
- Victor Brooks as Sergeant Ted Newton
- Edith Sharpe as Mrs. Thompson, Sapphire and Patsy's landlady
- Fenella Fielding as the manager of Babette's lingerie shop
- Basil Dignam as Dr. M.J. Burgess
- Marie Burke as Sapphire's previous landlady
- Peter Vaughan as Detective Whitehead
- Lloyd Reckord as the pianist at the International Club
- Dolores Mantez as a previous girlfriend of Paul Slade
- Philip Ray as Mr. Young, manager of the International Club
- Vanda Hudson as the blonde girl at Tulip's Club
- Boscoe Holder as "Johnnie Hot Feet", a dancer at Tulip's Club
- Dan Jackson as "Mr. Tulip"
- Bartlett Mullins as the newsagent
- Nora Gordon as the newsagent's wife
- Barbara Steele as a student

=== Cast notes ===
Earl Cameron later appeared in Flame in the Streets (1961), another British film dealing with racial issues.

== Production ==
The film was based on an original script by Janet Green that was inspired by the Notting Hill race riots. Producer Michael Relph and director Basil Dearden had just signed a contract with Rank which resulted in Violent Playground.

Filmink said "Rank’s films under [Earl] St John were famously timid in their story angles, especially compared to rivals such as Woodfall, Bryanston, Hammer and Romulus" but argued "the odd gutsy movie did sneak through", giving Sapphire as an example.

== Reception ==
=== Box office ===
According to Kinematograph Weekly, the film performed "better than average" at the British box office in 1959.

Variety claimed the film earned just under $700,000 in Britain in 1959.

Reportedly, it had made a profit of over £100,000 by 1961.

=== Critical reception ===
Variety called it "a well knit pic... Although it hasn't anything very sensational in the way of stellar lure for houses outside of England, it is a holding yarn, acted persuasively. But, though obviously inspired by outbreak of color-bar and Nottingham, it ducks the issue, refusing to face boldly up to the problem. Thus the pic does not get its message over as effectively as it might. There is constant haggling over the problem and some snide remarks, but it eventually adds up merely to another whodunit."

Josh Billings of Kinematograph Weekly wrote "I'm always a nervous of films dealing with racial discrimination, but by legitimately introducing skilfully contrived "whodunit” into this provocative subject the director and script writer of “Sapphire” have succeeded in manufacturing a purposeful and exciting thriller. The film, which had a marvellous press, has attracted all classes."

At the time of the film's original UK release, Nina Hibbin of the Daily Worker commented: "You can't fight the colour bar merely by telling people it exists. You have to attack it, with passion and conviction. Commit yourself up to the hilt. Otherwise you're in danger of fanning the flames."

In the US, A.H. Weiler of The New York Times wrote that, while the film is "not entirely in a class by itself, the combination of murder mystery and racial issues puts it several interesting cuts above standard movie melodrama".

Variety called the film a "Sound murder drama which compromises uneasily on question of color discrimination. Though obviously inspired by last year's outbreak of color-bar riots in London and Nottingham, it ducks the issue, refusing to face boldly up to the problem. Thus the pic does not get its message over as effectively as it might. There is constant haggling over the problem and some snide remarks, but it eventually adds up merely to another whodunit."

The reviewer for the British Film Institute's Screenonline website wrote: "Dearden is not immune to prevailing prejudices, equating a young woman living alone in London with promiscuity, and seeing an enthusiasm for jazz as evidence of dubious character. The film is littered with casual, unchallenged racism".

Filmink noted the movie "has been completely overshadowed by that team’s later Victim, but it is an interesting tale and it was a big hit. You can’t beat a murder mystery as an effective, crowd-pleasing way to explore societal problems."

=== Accolades ===
At the 13th British Academy Film Awards, Sapphire won the award for Best British Film. For her work on the film, the Mystery Writers of America awarded screenwriter Janet Green the Edgar Award for Best Foreign Film.

== Paperback novelisation ==
In April 1959, Panther Books published a novelisation of the film written by E.G. Cousins.
