= The League of Gentlemen (novel) =

1958 book by John Boland

- First h/c edition, 1958 (Publ. T. V. Boardman & Co.)
- Author: John Boland
- Language: English
- Publication date: 1958

The League of Gentlemen (1958) is a pulp-fiction novel by English author John Boland. The novel was made into the film The League of Gentlemen, which was released in 1960 and was the sixth most popular film at the UK box office in 1960.

== Plot summary ==
Lt. Col. Hyde retired after 25 years of service as an officer in the British Army. Hyde recruited seven other former officers for a project. These individuals had left the Army following various indiscretions and expressed dissatisfaction with the organization.

The job Hyde is planning turns out to be a bank robbery. Hyde has chosen the officers for their respective specialities, qualities that Hyde needs to succeed with the robbery. Before robbing the bank itself, however, they stage a number of raids to get the weapons and trucks they need, and all goes off without a hitch. Hyde uses all of his skills and discipline as a tactical military strategist to execute the plan. The robbery is organised with military precision and everything really seems to go as planned—except for one simple error that gives them all away.

== Sequels ==
Boland wrote two sequels to The League of Gentlemen, The Gentlemen Reform and The Gentlemen at Large, which were published in 1961 and 1962 respectively by T. V. Boardman & Co.
