= Robert Relf (cricketer) =

English cricketer

Cricket information
- Batting: Right-handed
- Bowling: Right-arm fast-medium

Career statistics
Competition	First-class
Matches	302
Runs scored	14,522
Batting average	28.41
100s/50s	24/71
Top score	272*
Balls bowled	?
Wickets	317
Bowling average	27.49
5 wickets in innings	12
10 wickets in match	2
Best bowling	8/79
Catches/stumpings	301/–
- Source: CricInfo

Robert Richard Relf (1 September 1883 – 28 April 1965) was an English first-class cricketer who was born in Berkshire. He played for Sussex and also represented PW Sherwell's XI. He was, for many years, cricket Coach at Leighton Park School in Reading. He was the younger brother of Albert Relf, who as well as playing for Sussex played 13 Tests for England.

Sporting positions
Preceded by Frank Hopkins	Hampshire cricket coach 1925–1930	Succeeded by None 1931–1938; Sam Staples 1939
