= And Soon the Darkness =

And Soon the Darkness may refer to:

- And Soon the Darkness (1970 film), a British thriller film
- And Soon the Darkness (2010 film), an American-Argentine mystery thriller film
