= Dulcima (1971 film) =

1971 British film by Frank Nesbitt

- Film poster
- Directed by: Frank Nesbitt
- Written by: Frank Nesbitt
- Based on: story by H. E. Bates
- Produced by: John L. Hargreaves; Basil Rayburn
- Starring: Carol White; John Mills
- Cinematography: Tony Imi
- Edited by: Bill Lewthwaite
- Music by: Johnny Douglas
- Production company: EMI Films
- Distributed by: MGM-EMI
- Release date: April 1972
- Running time: 98 minutes
- Country: United Kingdom
- Language: English

Dulcima is a 1971 British drama film directed by Frank Nesbitt starring John Mills and Carol White based on a story by H.E. Bates. The story revolves around a love triangle: a farmer, his housekeeper and the handsome neighbour.

== Plot ==
Dulcima Gaskain is the eldest daughter of a large, poor Gloucestershire farming family, with a father who ill-treats her. Visiting their neighbour, Mr Parker, she finds him unconscious in the farmyard, having drunkenly fallen and cut his head. She discovers his hat is stuffed with cash, and, despite his curmudgeonly attitude, volunteers to clean and tidy his filthy, chicken-ridden house.

Parker is a widower, and he eventually agrees to her suggestion that she become his housekeeper. His sexual interest in Dulcima is aroused when she arrives for work on a warm day with her blouse top open and revealing her cleavage. Dulcima fends him off by creating a fictitious boyfriend, 'Albert', inspired by a male model she has seen in a magazine.

Showing off, Parker introduces Dulcima to his shady dealings at the local livestock auction. As her employment continues, he neglects to pay her, but she keeps a careful tally of what he owes her.

Parker tries to spy on Dulcima as she bathes, and invites her to join him for a beer in the parlour, but she excuses herself. While house cleaning, she discovers that Parker has a lot of cash stowed away in various hiding places, and she begins to encourage his increasingly lustful interest, from time to time reminding him he owes her wages, but he always deflects her reminders. Eventually, she shares his bed, but she continues to call him 'Mr Parker'.

Out walking one day, Dulcima encounters Ashby, a young gamekeeper who resembles her fantasy boyfriend 'Albert'. He asks her to pass on his request to enter Parker's land when his pheasants stray there, but she never does, and when Parker later sees him on his farm property as he tries to round up some of his birds, he shows his displeasure.

When Parker finds Dulcima apparently packing to leave, she again mentions ‘Albert’ and the money Parker owes her. Panicked, he agrees to pay, and she claims £40 rather than the £20 or so she has recorded. But Parker under-pays her, so she later helps herself from his hidden cash hoard. She spends money on a hair-do, fashionable clothes, make-up and shoes. Parker is impressed by her transformation and begins to lessen his miserliness.

In town, Dulcima spots Ashby and purposely gets the same bus home as he does and they exchange glances. Getting off the bus at the same stop, they chat as they walk along the track which leads to both of their dwellings, and he picks some wild flowers and gives them to her.

Later, responding to Ashby's invitation, Dulcima goes to Ashby's cottage, and they have tea together.

Parker begins repeatedly asking Dulcima to marry him, but she keeps saying she wants to wait a bit. As part of his attempts to persuade her, he buys a TV set so that they would have something to do on winter evenings when they are married, and promises her more money, even revealing the hoard of cash which he is unaware she already knows about.

Later, on an impulse, Parker rushes into town as the shops are closing for the day, and buys a wedding dress for Dulcima and puts it into a gift box. But when he invites Dulcima to see what he has for her, she tells him she is going out to visit her family. Suspicious because she is dressed up in some of her new clothes, he follows her and sees her meet Ashby in a field, kiss him and head off toward his house. Parker presumably believes this is "Albert", whom he has never knowingly seen. Ashby and Dulcima go dancing. Parker gets drunk and becomes violent and abusive when she returns. She says she will leave in the morning and locks herself in her room. Parker smashes up the living room, including the new TV, and tears up the unwanted wedding dress, but then remorsefully pleads forgiveness through her locked bedroom door. She remains silent.

Next morning, from her bedroom window, Dulcima sees Ashby come into the farmyard. Going downstairs, the sight of the ruined wedding dress and a wedding ring in a box move her to tears, but there is no sign of Parker. Joining Ashby outside, she tearfully tells him she cannot go with him as she is too worried about Parker. Ashby tells her "You'd better stay then", just before Parker shoots him dead from an attic window.

== Cast ==
- Carol White as Dulcima Gaskain
- John Mills as Mr. Parker
- Stuart Wilson as Ashby the gamekeeper and as the male model in a knitting pattern advertisement
- Bernard Lee as Dulcima's father
- Sheila Raynor as Dulcima's mother
- Dudley Foster as Symes, Parker's partner-in-crime at the livestock auction
- Cyril Cross as Harris

== Production ==
=== Development ===
The story was taken from a novella of the same name by H. E. Bates which was published in the 1954 collection The Nature of Love. The Canadian television film Dulcima (1969) was based on the same novella, with the setting transferred to a small town in Ontario.

Film rights were obtained by Frank Nesbitt who had directed a number of documentaries, written scripts, directed two budget dramatic features (Do You Know This Voice?, Walk a Tightrope), and worked as an assistant director on expensive films.

In 1969, Bryan Forbes was appointed head of production at EMI Films. He was keen on promoting new filmmaking talent and financing a slate of inexpensive films. Forbes read a copy of Nesbitt's script for Dulcima and agreed to make the movie, asking John Mills to star and Nesbitt to direct. Forbes announced the production of Dulcima in August 1969 as part of his initial slate of productions, although the movie was not made until the following year; Mills and Nesbitt were attached from the beginning.

The female lead went to Carol White, best known for Cathy Comes Home and Poor Cow.

=== Shooting ===
The bulk of the movie was shot on location on a farm, over the summer in and around Minchinhampton and Tetbury in Gloucestershire. There was also some shooting at Elstree Studios. Filming started on 15 June 1970 and took six weeks. Shooting was plagued by rain.

"It's a fabulous part, one of the best I've ever had," said Mills. Carol White called Mills "one of my all-time favourite actors" and before filming "spent hours each day going over my part and even studied the scenes that I wasn't in. It was a heavy going romantic drama and, with a script steeped in the Cotswolds’ dialect, it wasn’t an easy part. But by the time filming commenced, I had found my way into the heart of the character; the lines all filed into place and had started to feel whole again."

Bryan Forbes later wrote that Nesbitt "showed great promise in his handling of this melodramatic, bucolic tale, shot entirely on location.

== Release and Reception ==
=== Berlin Film Festival ===
The film was the British entry at the Berlin Film Festival in June 1971, not long after Forbes had resigned from EMI. It was reviewed by The Daily Telegraph, which felt Mills was miscast in a role that required someone like Michel Simon. The Guardian called it "a kind of reverse Lady Chatterley's Lover" which was "competently, if boringly made." Variety called it "one of those polished, well acted, trimly directed, nicely outfitted British films which are easy to see, pleasantly so, even, and which are in no danger of going down in cinema history."

=== General release ===
The film was eventually released in British cinemas almost a year later in April 1972 and was a commercial failure. Forbes wrote that "as with And Soon the Darkness", another film Forbes greenlit at EMI, "the cinema and distribution arms of the company showed no great enthusiasm for either film. Purely from a commercial standpoint it seemed an irresponsible waste of the shareholders’ money. Properly marketed with a little imagination and given a chance to succeed, their fate could have been quite different."

Reviewing the film again the Daily Telegraph called it "an entirely honorable failure." Sight and Sound said "the script swerves uncertainly between women’s mag sentimentalism and brooding tragedy, and the prettiness of the locations does much to dissipate both moods." The Guardian felt the script was "played for all that its worth and possibly more" by Mills and White but did not "think for a moment that the story... can take its bloody, melodramatic ending."

The movie was released in the USA in the latter half of 1972. The Los Angeles Times called it "a fine English film" that was "sensitiviely written and directed."

White later wrote in her memoirs that Dulcima "was a good film, like many good films, but it still lacked the magic ingredient that made those reels of celluloid into cinema history." John Mills's biographer argued "the story suffered from neither relationship being believable; nor did the two young actors have the weight to carry the abrupt and melodramatic climax which was straight out of a Victorian novel... What Dulcima really needed was a French treatment by Marcel Pagnol and a director like Claude Berri."

=== Later reviews ===
Yorkshire magazine declared the movie is little more than a curiosity piece that sits somewhere between period dramas such as The Go-Between and the bawdiness of the Confessions… series."

Stephen Vagg of Filmink magazine later called Dulcima one of the films the Bryan Forbes should not have made at EMI, the others being Mr. Forbush and the Penguins, The Breaking of Bumbo and A Fine and Private Place. He compared the movie with Hoffman, another film Forbes greenlit at EMI, calling both:

An inexpensive drama, which had been previously filmed for TV about a horny older man going for a younger woman... [On such films] Everything has to come off for it to work (script, casting, handling). Also, like Hoffman I don’t think it does and no one went to see it... I can’t imagine why Forbes wanted to make one drama about a creepy middle aged man who chases after young girl let alone two. Sure, it’s cheap but does anyone like that story ever, unless it’s in the form of a thriller or a horror where we identify with the girl? And it’s not as though EMI had that much competition for story material in 1969 – were there no other scripts available?

However Neil Sinyard, in a review of Nesbitt's movies as director, felt "It is hard to imagine how the two leading performances could have been bettered" in Dulcima with "judicious additions and modifications" to the original novella.

== Other versions ==
In 1982 Nica Burns adapted the show for the stage.

== Notes ==
- White, Carol (1982). Carol comes home. New English Library. ISBN 978-0-450-05528-7.
