= The Man Who Haunted Himself =

1970 British film by Basil Dearden

- Theatrical release poster
- Directed by: Basil Dearden
- Screenplay by: Basil Dearden; Michael Relph; Bryan Forbes
- Based on: novel The Strange Case of Mr Pelham by Anthony Armstrong
- Produced by: Michael Relph
- Starring: Roger Moore; Hildegarde Neil
- Cinematography: Tony Spratling
- Edited by: Teddy Darvas
- Music by: Michael J. Lewis
- Production companies: EMI Films, Associated British Picture Corporation; Excalibur Films
- Distributed by: Warner-Pathé (UK)
- Release date: 5 July 1970 (UK)
- Running time: 94 minutes
- Country: United Kingdom
- Language: English
- Budget: £400,000 or £275,000

The Man Who Haunted Himself is a 1970 British psychological thriller film directed by Basil Dearden and starring Roger Moore. It was written by Dearden, Michael Relph and Bryan Forbes based on the 1957 novel The Strange Case of Mr Pelham by Anthony Armstrong, and is a variation on the Jekyll and Hyde story. It was Dearden's final film prior to his death in 1971.

== Plot ==
While driving home from his London office, Harold Pelham, a director of the marine technology company Freeman, Pelham & Dawson, seems to undergo a sudden personality change and starts to drive both fast and recklessly, imagining himself in a sports car, and ending in a serious high-speed crash. On the operating table he briefly suffers clinical death, after which there briefly appear to be two heartbeats on the monitor.

After he recovers from the accident, Pelham notices odd things occurring and people acting strangely, and he gradually finds his life in turmoil. Friends, colleagues and acquaintances claim to have seen him in places where he has no memory of having been or of doing things he can't recall, involving behaving in rash ways quite out of character. When he gets home from work he finds a friend is at his house for a drink which he doesn't recall arranging, and an attractive girl at the company swimming pool casts him a knowing glance. At bedtime he and his wife have a somewhat tense but amicable discussion about their recent lack of a sex life. His wife also notices a mysterious silver car which she sees parked outside their house, but gives it no further thought. The driver of the car is then seen lighting a cigarette and snapping the match stick in half after he blows it out, exactly as Pelham does.

There seems to be a spy at work trying to force a merger with a rival company. Soon Pelham suspects there is a "double" masquerading as him.

On a night out at the company club with his wife, he hopes to energise their relationship by indulging her request to go gambling, but he is tense and clearly not interested. As they are about to leave he bumps into the attractive girl, who sees his wife a short distance away and says "I didn't know you were married." His wife notices the exchange and is furious. Pelham finds out where the girl lives and confronts her; confused, she makes it clear that "he" was having an affair with her. He angrily denies the affair.

At work Pelham discovers that he apparently was supporting a merger that he now opposes with the board. He confronts an executive of the other company, who explains how the two of them had clandestinely arranged the deal in a series of meetings, to "his" (the double's) benefit as well as the company's, when "he" revealed a "top secret" technology breakthrough his company was about to make. When he confronts the rival firm (run by Ashton) he is reminded of three secret meetings: at the top of The Monument; in the London Planetarium; and in a boat on The Serpentine.

Distraught and unable to explain the unfolding events he consults a psychiatrist, Dr Harris, and undergoes extended treatment in his clinic. Harris explains that he doesn't believe Pelham is mad but perhaps was acting out of a subconscious desire to break out of his obsessively rigid lifestyle. Pelham agrees to be admitted to the psychiatrist's clinic for a few days' observation.

On his discharge Harris persuades Pelham to adopt some less conventional behaviour, so he goes to work dressed quite differently. However, during his time away, the double finalised the merger and took his wife out on the town, culminating in their going home and having sex together.

Pelham calls his home from the office and is astonished when the phone is answered by someone claiming to be himself. He drives home and comes face to face with his double, who insists he is the real Pelham. The family and his best friend are all there and side with the double.

After asking the others to let the two of them speak alone, the double tells the "real" Pelham that the new clothes were a mistake, and explains how on the operating table the double was "let out" but there is only room in this world for one of them. Both insist they will go to the police.

The real Pelham drives off in his car, agitated. The double immediately leaves and pursues him in the sports car. Dr Harris happens to see both men and is shocked. After a high-speed chase in the rain, the two cars race towards each other on a bridge. The real Pelham swerves off into the river, and just before he hits the water his image fades away.

The double stops and looks down into the water and then, to the sound of a double heartbeat, he briefly clutches his chest as if in extreme pain, but the spasm soon passes and he becomes calm: there is once more only one Pelham.

== Cast ==
- Roger Moore as Harold Pelham
- Hildegarde Neil as Eve Pelham
- Alastair Mackenzie as Michael Pelham
- Hugh Mackenzie as James Pelham
- Kevork Malikyan as Luigi, Pelham's butler
- Thorley Walters as Frank Bellamy
- Anton Rodgers as Tony Alexander
- Olga Georges-Picot as Julie Anderson
- Freddie Jones as Dr. Harris, the psychiatrist
- John Welsh as Sir Charles Freeman
- Edward Chapman as Barton
- Laurence Hardy as Mason
- Charles Lloyd-Pack as Jameson
- Gerald Sim as Morrison
- Ruth Trouncer as Miss Bird, Pelham's secretary
- Aubrey Richards as research scientist
- Anthony Nicholls as Sir Arthur Richardson
- John Carson as Ashton
- Basil Henson as casino manager (uncredited)
- Tony Wright as man in club (uncredited)

== Original story ==
The film was based on The Case of Mr Pelham, a 1940 short story which was expanded into a 1957 novel. The story was previously filmed as a 30-minute short for television as part of the series Alfred Hitchcock Presents: Series 1 Episode 11: "The Case of Mr Pelham", starring Tom Ewell and directed by Alfred Hitchcock.

The story was also adapted twice for BBC television (in 1948 and 1955) and for BBC radio (in 1946). It was also adapted for Australian radio in 1959 for the Harry Dearth Playhouse.

== Production ==
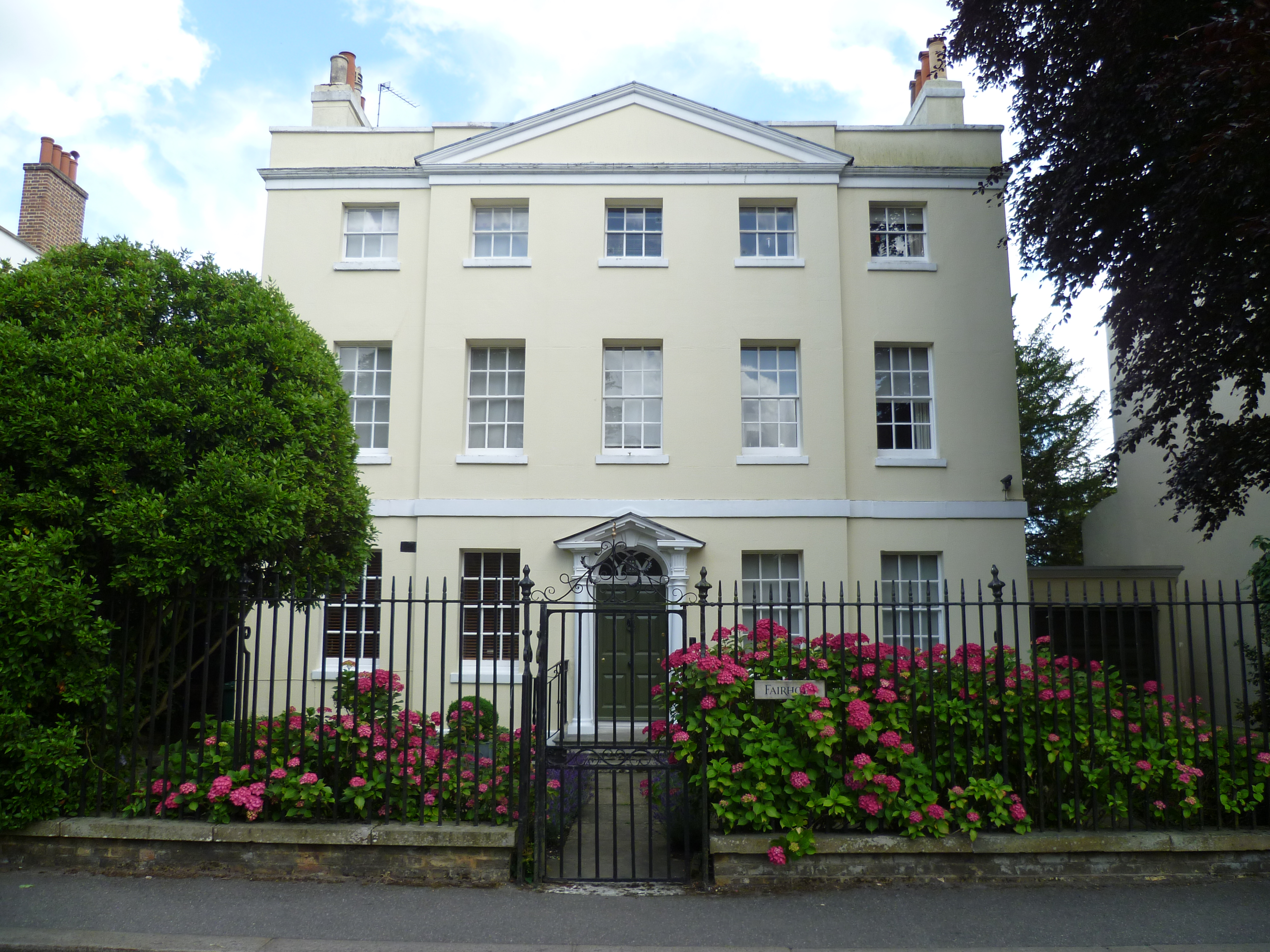
Fairholt, Hadley Green, which featured as the home of Harold Pelham in the film.

=== Development ===
The film was one of the first three greenlit by Bryan Forbes while he was head of EMI Films (the others were Hoffman and And Soon the Darkness). The film was announced in August 1969.

And Soon the Darkness started filming first then The Man Who Haunted Himself and Hoffman. It was part of an overall slate of fifteen films Forbes intended to make at EMI which cost between £5-10 million. This slate also included The Railway Children, The Breaking of Bumbo, John Quigly's The Bitter Lollipop, Dulcima, Dennis Barker's A Candidate of Promise, A Fine and Private Place, the musical The Bernado Boys, Simon Raven's The Feathers of Death, Mr. Forbush and the Penguins, The Go Between, an untitled Richard Condon script to be directed by John Bryson, and a second film from Roger Moore, based on his own story (with a script by Julian Bond) called A Question of Innocence, which Moore was to direct. (Some of these films were never made.)

Moore, Relph and Dearden were old friends of Forbes's. Moore was best known at the time for playing The Saint, although production on that series had ceased and Moore had returned to features with Crossplot. Relph said the film would give Moore "a new dimension. Roger Moore is a good actor. Very under-rated." Moore called the movie "a deliberate decision on my part. If you want to get away from the TV image, then you must take a leap into the far, far dark."

Roger Moore said, "The only way I've had to extend myself before was to Carry On Charming. This is the first picture for eleven years in which I've had to show any emotion. I'm grateful for the chance to show that saintliness is not my only stock in trade." His fee was £20,000 plus a deferment.

It was the first film for South African actor Hildegarde Neil, who had worked with the Royal Shakespeare Company.

=== Shooting ===
Filming started at Elstree Studios on 25 August 1969. "We are not making cheap films," said Forbes. "We're not saving on the films themselves. The sets are perfect but actors and others are helping us keep costs down."

Teddy Darvas, the editor, recalled "Roger Moore was most conscientious. Basil Dearden was a bit scared of him because of the "Saint" image and was afraid to sort of pull him up because Roger Moore did the sort of raising the eyebrows, he used to do as the Saint. But eventually they became very good friends and it became a joke that you just had to be told that that was the Saint and it was a great laugh."

Darvas also stated:

Basil was so impatient that he would say 'Action' before the clapper boy was off the screen sometimes. And he would say 'Cut' sometimes even before an actor had finished a line. And, in fact, there is one shot in "The Man Who Haunted Himself" if you look carefully on a full screen, where you can still see the last three frames of the clapper boy disappearing off the screen because there was no cover and you had to use it. Bryan Forbes was a very old friend of Basil Dearden. He was on the floor one day and I was standing there and just to take the mickey out of Basil he said 'Tell me Teddy, is he giving you enough frames to put your scissors in at the beginning and the end of a shot?'.

=== Lamborghini Islero ===
The 1969 Lamborghini Islero GTS that appeared in the film, registration YLR 11G, sold at auction in 2010 for £106,400. It is one of only five right-hand-drive versions of the model to be built. The car was auctioned again in March 2020, achieving a hammer price of £265,000 (£296,800 including commission, fees, etc.).

=== Basil Dearden ===
It was Dearden's last film. On 23 March 1971 he was travelling home from his office at Pinewood Studios along the M4 when he veered off the road and hit a road sign, resulting in his car bursting into flames. Forbes said "Basil was a colleague and a close friend for many years. He was probably one of the best craftsman British films have produced." The Man Who Haunted Himself also featured a crash on the M4. The following day Forbes resigned as head of EMI Films.

== Release ==
The film was released in July 1970 along with Hoffman and And Soon the Darkness. Forbes said the films were made "on the cheapest budgets commensurate with quality. We aim to make them profitable in the English market and not have to depend on sales abroad- which is where many companies have come unstuck."

Moore later wrote, "I think there was a certain resentment in the hierarchy of EMI towards Bryan Forbes at that time....There were noticeable undercurrents all around, not least in EMI’s distribution arm. It was petty jealousy, I guess. Consequently, though, over all the films, the publicity machinery was cranked up in a rather amateurish way, sending out the message 'We’ve made a film for £200,000: aren’t we clever?’ It was akin to EMI saying 'we’re making cheap films'... What the marketing people should have said is that they made terrific films, and such was the principals' belief in them that they had taken reduced fees. The films were excellent but the publicity let them down."

=== Critical reception ===
Initial reviews of the film were negative. Michael McNay of The Guardian wrote: "Basil Dearden handles the story professionally enough" but "this isn't my particular cup of ectoplasm." The Observer called it "an unmitigated piece of hokum that looks and sounds more like Pinewood 1948 than Elstree 1970." Sight and Sound called it a "depressed psychological thriller which sets the clock back twenty years in its stolid treatment of a story about a business executive plagued by his alter ego. An inauspicious start to Bryan Forbes' new production programme." Alexander Walker of the Evening Standard called it "ingenious... if a little too dragged out at times."

Retrospectively, editor Teddy Darvas called it "a pretty good film, really. The ending is very unbelievable." Writer Wheeler Winston Dixon stated: "Slick and glossy, and looking very much the low-budget theatrical offering that it was, The Man Who Haunted Himself, despite its intriguing doppelganger theme, seems more like a television movie than anything else, and is far from Dearden’s prime work."

Moore named this as his best film. He said in 2011: "It was a film I actually got to act in, rather than just being all white teeth and flippant and heroic." In 2024 The Guardian's film critic Peter Bradshaw highlighted it as "a genuinely excellent performance" by Moore.

=== Box office ===
Box-office results were disappointing. In July 1970 the Birmingham Mail reported neither Hoffman or The Man Who Haunted Himself "have burnt up any box office tills; nor have they shown signs of getting critical raves." Bernard Delfont called And Soon the Darkness, Hoffman and The Man Who Haunted Himself "the real dodos belly-flopping out of Elstree."

Alexander Walker later argued The Man Who Haunted Himself, Hoffman and And Now the Darkness "were all films obviously rushed into production to get the studio ship-shape again: Forbes couldn’t afford the luxury of waiting for the off-beat, or chancing an untested project. But it might have been better if he had. The three films were released "back to back' (i.e. following each other in consecutive weeks) across the country – as E.M.I. had then no West End 'showcase' cinema – and coincided with the World Cup football play-offs, a heat wave, and a general election."

Moore argued the film "was not the commercial success it deserved to be. It saddened me greatly – not least because I owned a share of the profits!" Bernard Delfont, head of EMI, later said about the film: "'I should have put a stop to that one."

Bryan Forbes's position at EMI never recovered. He argued: "'It was a small English film and at that point it was one of the troughs of the English film industry. Whereas in the sixties, British films had been very well received, by 1969/70 we were bad news again and nobody wanted to know. So the film didn’t get what I felt were its just desserts."

Although the film's poor box office performance led to Moore's return to television by starring in The Persuaders, the film was re-released in cinemas in late 1972 to take advantage of publicity from Moore's casting as James Bond. In one scene in the film, his character had said "Espionage isn't all James Bond on Her Majesty's Secret Service."

=== Home media ===
The film was released on DVD format in 2005 with a PG rating. The DVD includes special features including a commentary by Roger Moore and Bryan Forbes.

A new HD restoration from the original film elements was released in a dual-format package on 24 June 2013 by Network. The Blu-ray disc is in a widescreen aspect ratio as was used in cinemas. Special features include: 34 minute music suite of Michael J. Lewis's original score; a commentary track recorded in 2005, featuring Roger Moore and Bryan Forbes; the original theatrical trailer; four image galleries, including storyboards; and promotional material in PDF format. An article is available on Network's website detailing the transfer and restoration of the film.

== Notes ==
- Moore, Roger; Owen, Gareth (2009). My word is my bond : a memoir. Thorndike Press. ISBN 978-1-4104-1510-3.
