= Paul Watson (documentary filmmaker) =

English documentary filmmaker (1942–2023)

- Born: 17 February 1942; Paddington, London, England
- Died: 18 November 2023 (aged 81)
- Occupation: Documentary filmmaker
- Years active: 1967–2010

Paul Watson (17 February 1942 – 18 November 2023) was a British television documentary filmmaker.

== Biography ==
Watson was born on 17 February 1942 in Paddington, London, England, and grew up in Wood Green. Family moved to Bolton in Lancashire after his father obtained work in the textile mills. Attended Altrincham Grammar School, Cheshire. Attained A Level Art aged 16. Watson attended Manchester Regional College of Art, then the Royal College of Art in London, from 1963 to 1966. He started working for the BBC in the mid-1960s, his first job being as a researcher on Whicker's World. He was given his own documentary series, A Year in the Life, followed by singles for the Tuesday's Documentary strand.

Watson attempted to make his drama feature debut as writer and director with A Fine and Private Place but the film was abandoned during production.

In 1974, Watson made The Family, one of his most well-known programmes. In the following decade, he worked with Egyptologist John Romer and made singles for Real Lives and 40 Minutes strands, including The Fishing Party in 1985. In 1987, undertook secondment at WGBH in Boston. From 1989, he headed a production unit at BBC Elstree, where he instigated Sylvania Waters. At Elstree, he worked primarily as an executive producer on series such as Present Imperfect. From 1993 to 1994, he was appointed Series Editor of 40 Minutes. He left the BBC in 1994.

Beginning in 1995, Watson worked for Granada TV, making singles for the Cutting Edge strand and the first of two films about Malcolm Pointon and his diagnosis with Alzheimer's (Malcolm and Barbara: A Love Story). From 1999/2000, he headed documentary production at United Productions (part of United News and Media, in collaboration with Anglia, HTV and Meridian; United Productions taken over by Granada Media in 2000). Left United Productions in 2002. In 2002, Watson formed his own production company Priory Pictures, making one of his most acclaimed films Rain In My Heart. In 2007, the second of two films about Malcolm Pointon and his Alzheimer's disease was broadcast (Malcolm and Barbara: Loves Farewell). In 2009–2010, he returned to media work, writing and directing radio plays for BBC Radio 4. He lived in Tonbridge, Kent.

Watson died from complications of dementia on 18 November 2023, at the age of 81.

== Documentaries as director and producer ==
- Whicker's World: A Dubious Fraternity (BBC Two, 1967). Film about a small-time crook in the wasteland of London's W.11.
- Whicker's World: South Sea Island Coronation (BBC Two, 1968). Film about a king being crowned in Polynesia.
- Whicker's World: Singapore 999 (BBC Two, 1968). Film about the city state of Singapore.
- Whicker's World: Birds'-Eye View (BBC Two, 1968). On the anniversary of the Suffragettes, a film about the dreams and opinions of three young women.
- A Year in the Life: For the Big Deal Group (BBC Two, 1969). Film about a pop group trying to make it in the music business.
- A Year in the Life: For Craghead (BBC Two, 1969). Film about the threatened closure of a colliery in Craghead, County Durham.
- A Year in the Life: For Sonia and David: Just Married (BBC Two, 1969). Film about a new marriage.
- A Year in the Life for The Honourable Member (BBC Two, 1969). Film about an MP, from by-election to his first year in Parliament.
- A Year in the Life: For A Man Determined (BBC Two, 1969). Film about a man who has polyneuritis.
- A Year in the Life for Tony, Rebel Rocker (BBC Two, 1969). Film about a member of a motorcycle gang.
- A Year in the Life for A Devonshire Farm (BBC Two, 1969). Film about the trials and tribulations of farming.
- A Year in the Life for Thamesmead, Town for Tomorrow (BBC Two, 1969). Film about the building of Thamesmead new town.
- A Year in the Life: For King Kathie 100/7 (BBC Two 1969). Film about a race horse.
- A Year in the Life: For A Very English Haven (BBC Two, 1969). Film about Salcombe, Devon, a retirement town that explodes with tourists in the summer months.
- A Year in the Life: For the Curate (BBC Two, 1969). Film about the journey from theological college to ordination to first year as Curate in the dock-land area of Liverpool.
- A Year in the Life for The Making of Mrs Markham (BBC Two, 1969). Film about a playwright.
- Two Years in the Life: A Dream Car (BBC Two, 1970). Film about the making of a super car.
- The Red Cross: Tuesday's Documentary (BBC One, 1971). Film about the Red Cross as it carries out its work in England, Switzerland and war-torn Jordan.
- Strike Command: Tuesday's Documentary (BBC One, 1971). Film about the Defence of Britain in the 70s.
- Our Children and the Germans: Tuesday's Documentary (BBC One, 1971). A group of young British people experience the German way of life and decide whether they want to be part of the new Europe or not.
- The Block: Tuesday's Documentary (BBC One, 1972). Filmed in Southwark, London about people living below the poverty line.
- The Group: Tuesday's Documentary (BBC One, 1973). Film about the rituals of group life in a hospital ward for alcoholics.
- Race of the Power Bikes (BBC Two, 1973). Film about the Formula 750cc motorcycle race held on the Isle of Man TT week.
- The Family (BBC One, 1974). Series in which the Wilkins family from Reading have a BBC film crew living with them.
- Festival 40: Dispute (BBC Two, 1976). Film about a trade union dispute exactly as it happened, with no preparation or rehearsal.
- Nobody Asked Us (BBC One, 1980). Film about the recent steel strike based which focuses on a steelworker family from Corby.
- Romer's Egypt: Diary of a Search (BBC Two, 1981). Film about eccentric egyptologist John Romer's search for treasure.
- Romer's Egypt: 5000-2215 BC (BBC Two, 1983). Egyptologist John Romer visits Giza, Aswan and Sakkara.
- Romer's Egypt: 2700-1070 BC (BBC Two, 1983). Romer examines the private lives of ancient Egyptians.
- Romer's Egypt:1570-30 BC (BBC Two, 1983). Romer visits Deir el Medina.
- Vox Pop (BBC One, 1983). 10-part weekly serial about the views and opinions of the people of Darwen, Lancashire.
- The Family: The After Years (BBC Two, 1983). Film about the aftermath of the making of The Family.
- Real Lives: Lost in Space (BBC One, 1985). Film about a lost satellite filmed at NASA in Texas.
- 40 Minutes:The House of Hope (BBC Two, 1985). Film about a Dorset-based therapeutic community run by Christians.
- 40 Minutes: The Fishing Party (BBC Two, 1985). Film about four young city commodity-brokers who go on a fishing in Scotland to see if they can break the world record for a catch of skate.
- 40 Minutes: Convictions (BBC Two, 1998). Film about what turns people into criminals.
- Revelations (BBC One, 1988). Film about patriots and bible believers in West Virginia.
- One Day... (BBC Two, 1989). Film about John Wallwork, a heart surgeon.
- One Day... (BBC Two, 1989). Film about Amelia Bryant, a model.
- One Day... (BBC Two, 1989). Film about Michael Drummond, a homeless man.
- One Day... (BBC Two, 1989). Film about Jimmy Devlin, a pop manager.
- One Day... (BBC Two, 1989). Film about Ellie Laine, a comedienne.
- One Day... (BBC Two, 1989). Film about Barney Curley, a professional gambler.
- Yo! Bug Jam (BBC Two, 1990). Film about a Volkswagen festival at a Santa Pod raceway.
- Yo! Get Shreddin' (BBC Two, 1990). Film about an event at America's top skate state in California.
- Yo! Surfs Up (BBC Two, 1990). Film about California's biggest surfing event - the Pepsi/O'Neill Coldwater Challenge.
- Tomorrow's Child (BBC One, 1990). Film about children's rights .
- Sylvania Waters (BBC One/ABC, 1992). Series about an Australian family.
- Sarajevo - A Street Under Siege (BBC Two, 1993). Broadcast as 2-minute shorts before Newsnight for a day-by-day account of the siege and how it affected ordinary citizens.
- Trick on Two (BBC Two, 1992). Celebrities watch magic tricks performed by talented British magicians.
- The Factory (Granada TV/Channel 4, 1995). 5-part series on the Robinson Willey gas fire manufacturers in Liverpool 13.
- Cutting Edge: The Home (Granada TV/Channel 4, 1996). Film about Redmere Lodge, St. Leonards-on-Sea, a residential home for elderly people.
- Cutting Edge: The Dinner Party (Granada TV/Channel 4, 1997). Film about a group of Home Counties dinner party guests.
- White Lives (Granada TV/Channel 4,1998). Film about South Africa.
- Malcolm and Barbara: A Love Story (Granada TV/ITV, 1999). Film about charting a husband's descent into Alzheimer's dementia and his wife's care for a once-loving husband who now scarcely recognises her.
- Cutting Edge: A Wedding In The Family (United Productions/Channel 4, 2000). Film about a wedding in middle England.
- The Queen's Wedding (Priory Pictures/Channel 4, 2002). Filmed in and around Manchester's gay community, the central event is the marriage of two gay men.
- Desert Darlings (Priory Pictures/Channel 4, 2003). 3-part series following six couples who spend a month in the Namibian desert on an adventure holiday organised by a Falklands veteran.
- Rain In My Heart (Priory Pictures/BBC Two, 2006). Film charting the traumas faced by four alcoholics and the emotional impact their struggle has had on those around them.
- Uncharted Territory (Priory Pictures/BBC Two, 2006). Daytime series about people hunting for holiday homes.
- Malcolm and Barbara: Love's Farewell (ITV Productions/ITV, 2007). Film following the progression of Alzheimer disease in a middle-aged man and its impact of his marriage.

== Documentaries as executive producer ==
- Different Drummer (BBC Two, 1989). Series about unusual and eccentric Americans.
- Power Behind The Throne (BBC Two, 1989). Portrait of politician Willie Whitelaw.
- Denis Healey - The Man Who Did the Dirty Work (BBC Two, 1989). Portrait of Denis Healey, defence secretary, chancellor of the exchequer and deputy Labour leader.
- Great Journeys (BBC Two, 1989). 8-part series about travellers on the world's great highways, including poet Hugo Williams taking the Pan-American Highway.
- A Year in the Life (BBC Two, 1989-1990). Series of films about the people who took part in the series A Year in the Life.
- Present Imperfect (BBC, Two 1990). Series about life in 90s Britain.
- Carnival Street (BBC One, 1990). Series following five families in the lead up to the Notting Hill Carnival.
- Belle and the Glory Boys (BBC Two, 1990). Film about Second World War American bomber.
- Tomorrow's Child (BBC One, 1990). Film about the terrible conditions under which many of the world's children live.
- The Sentence (BBC Two, 1990). Series about Glen Parva Young Offenders Institution.
- In Solidarity (BBC Two, 1991). 4-part series about Poland and the collapse of communism.
- Bunkum and Balderdash (BBC Two, 1991). Film Portrait of Sir Bernard Ingham.
- From Wimps to Warriors (BBC Two, 1991). Series about the myths surrounding masculinity.
- Follow the Money (BBC Two, 1992). Series about the UK business landscape
- Classic Adventure (BBC One, 1992). Series about global adventure.
- States of Mind (BBC Two/PBS, 1992). Series exploring American life.
- Inside Victor Lewis-Smith (BBC Two, 1993. Victor Lewis-Smith's observations on the world of television from his hospital bed.
- Jungle Janes (United Productions/Channel 4, 2001). 12 British middle-aged women trek their way through the jungles of Brunei.

== Documentaries as series editor ==
- Theatre School (BBC Two, 1993). Series following hopefuls through a year at London's Drama Centre.
- 40 Minutes (BBC Two, 1993-1994).

== Fiction/drama documentary as writer, director or producer ==
- A Fine and Private Place (EMI, 1969). Feature film project developed, written but not completed with Bryan Forbes Head of EMI.
- The Rothko Conspiracy (BBC Two, 1983). Dramatisation of the 1970 New York art world financial scandal.
- Breakaway Girls (BBC One, 1978). 4-part series, each episode telling a real life case history about a girl who has run away from home.

== Radio plays as writer/director ==
- The Friday Play: How Now TV (BBC Radio 4, 2009). Tragicomedy about the television industry.
- The Friday Play: An Unhappy Countess (BBC Radio 4, 2009). Play set in England in 1786 about a young woman pursued by devious men after she is left a coal-mining fortune.
- Afternoon Play: My Lovely Man (BBC Radio 4, 2009). Set 1958, tells the story of a debutante whose parents are pushing her into marriage with the son of an Viscount.
- Last Family Standing (BBC Radio 4, 2010). Set in 1946 about a family living under wartime austerity.

== Awards ==
- 1970 SFTA (pre-BAFTA) Television Factual: Documentary for A Year in the Life
- 1998 Broadcasting Press Guild Award Best Single Documentary for Cutting Edge: The Dinner Party
- 2000 Royal Television Society Best Single Documentary for Malcolm and Barbara - A Love Story
- 2007 Prix Europa for Rain in My Heart
- 2007 Leipzig Prize Best Humanitarian Film Award for Rain in my Heart
- 2007 The Grierson Trust Best Documentary on a Contemporary Issue for Rain in my Heart
- 2007 The Grierson Trustees' Award for Outstanding Contribution to the Art of Documentary Film Making
- 2007 Mental Health Media Award for Rain In My Heart.
- 2008 BAFTA Alan Clarke Award
- 2008 Broadcasting Press Guild Award Best Single Documentary/Factual Programme for Malcolm and Barbara – Love’s Farewell

== Nominations ==
- 1973 BAFTA Television Factual Programme for The Block
- 1987 BAFTA Television Flaherty Documentary Award for Forty Minutes: The Fishing Party
- 1997 BAFTA Television Flaherty Documentary Award for Cutting Edge: The Home
- 1998 Grierson Awards for White Lives [what award?]
- 2000 BAFTA Television Flaherty Documentary Award for Malcolm And Barbara - A Love Story
- 2007 BAFTA Television Single Documentary in 2007 for Rain In My Heart
- 2008 BAFTA Television Single Documentary in 2008 for Malcolm And Barbara: Love's Farewell

== Reputation, Influence & Legacy ==
“…no account of how observational documentary has developed in Britain could leave out Watson’s The Family…The Family, as well as Sylvania Waters (which depicted the life of an Australian family and is often referred to as the first docusoap proper) are generally positioned as key examples of observational documentary’s domestic gaze”.

"Anyone Googling Paul Watson will soon read that he is credited with creating reality TV. His 1993 series Sylvania Waters is widely regarded as the first reality show in TV history, just as his 1974 series, The Family, invented the fly-on-the-wall serial. "People say you're the godfather of reality television," he scoffs. "Who'd want to be a godfather to such bastards?".

On presenting Watson with the 2008 BAFTA Special Award for Outstanding Creative Contribution to the industry, John Wills described him as "...one of the giants of documentary film-making. Over several decades he has created a string of memorable and often controversial documentaries, always striving for innovation in both form and content and invariably succeeding. He is a very well deserved winner of this prestigious BAFTA Special Award".

Michael Cockerell has said of Watson, "…he is an extremely controversial figure. Views about him are totally split. He is a person who inspires both devotion and detestation, but I'm on his side because he's an original. Sparks fly when Paul's around. He is someone who has pushed the ways of making documentaries forward. He's an observer of real life who doesn't wrap it in sugar-coated parcels."

Peter Moore has said of Watson, "Paul is a legend, one of the greats of this generation, if not the greatest. For young film-makers, he's a marvellous icon. We need more mischief-making programmes. You shouldn't be in television unless you occasionally upset the apple cart and have a nose for mischief. Television would be terribly dull if we just massaged the egos of the rich and famous. My view is we're here to cause trouble - and long may it be so."

Louis Theroux’s curated documentary list for BBC iPlayer includes Watson’s Rain in my Heart. The impact of Rain in My Heart can be seen in directly on Theroux's own documentary Drinking to Oblivion. Theroux describes Watson's documentary as "harrowing".

== Controversy ==
The Family (BBC One, 1974), a documentary series about the Wilkins family from Reading, created controversy when it was shown in 1974. Watson has stated that, "Back then, working-class people weren't directly presented on TV… You'd have experts standing in front of them; the great and the good referring to 'these people'." When he created The Family, Watson has said, “I had an agenda…I wanted to put a working-class family on television because it had not been done and they had much to tell”. The programme created an immediate stir. “Many viewers were genuinely shocked at the way ordinary people could open up their most intimate - though usually minor - secrets to the public gaze”. During the broadcast of the series, Watson reported that “We had lots of obnoxious letters from the middle classes saying how dare you show these people…here were the Wilkins, with a love child, living in overcrowded conditions, teaching their children to fib to the council about getting housing points. These things had never been discussed on a popular mainstream channel like BBC1". A year or so after the broadcast, the Wilkinses’ marriage broke up. Watson said, “I was accused of wrecking a family…But they [the couple] said, ‘Paul, look, we have just watched ourselves for 12 weeks and we can see perfectly easily that we are just chalk and cheese together.’ I put a big mirror in front of them”.

The Fishing Party (BBC Two, 1985), broadcast as part of the 40 Minutes strand, was a documentary about four friends, all rich young city commodity-brokers, who go on a fishing holiday in Scotland to see if they can break the world record for a catch of skate. The film was pitched as capturing the mood of the Thatcher years and the contributors were as representative of “rabid Thatcherism”. One of the contributors was later fined £650 for shooting at a seagull. In 2006, the contributors reputedly hijacked an appearance by Watson at the 2006 Sheffield Doc Fest and accused him of ruining their lives [further corroboration required].^{.} Watson's defence of The Fishing Party was that he did not "'stitch them up'. Quite the reverse, I open(ed) them up. In order to do that I have to manipulate. That is done only in the cutting room, not on location. The process is called editing. By juxtaposing scenes and statements that I consider to be relevant, certain truths become evident". The programme has been labelled as "Thatcher's least favourite film (because) it galvanised distaste for the Tory Government." It later transpired that the programme had been 'referred upwards' to senior management because of queasiness about its depiction of four extreme right-wing apologists.

Sylvania Waters (BBC One/ABC, 1992) is a documentary series about the domestic life of an Australian family from Sylvania Waters, a well-off Sydney suburb. Noeline, described as the “loud-mouthed matriarch of the nouveau riche Baker-Donaher family” claimed that she was scorned when the programme was shown in Australia. "They told us our address wouldn't be used, then the name was changed from The Family to Sylvania Waters and we had helicopters above our home and reporters all over our garden". "Only last week I was verbally attacked by a group of hooligans outside my house". There was further controversy in 1993, when Noeline appeared at the Edinburgh International Television Festival and took part in a face-to-face conversation with the programmes Directors Brian Hills and Kate Wood. [Watson was the programme producer.] She told the audience of television professionals that, "I've cried, I've wept, I've wailed, I've screamed…and I'd like to put my hands around the producer Paul Watson’s neck”, adding that she had been driven to the verge of suicide. After hearing of Watson's difficulties at the BBC, she reportedly said ''I'm glad that he's hit rock bottom. What he did to me was character assassination. He made me a monster''. Watson’s response to Noeline’s remarks was, "Bollocks…I left her with an agent, a manager and an accountant because she was becoming famous, and it was the only way they could think of to make money. In the end she asked me to make another series. She hugs me now".

The Dinner Party (Channel 4, 1997), broadcast under the Cutting Edge strand, is a film about eight friends, all wealthy British Conservatives, who come together for a dinner party in the lead up to Labour’s 1997 electoral victory. Described in Channel 4’s programme listings as capturing “the end of the 1979–1997 Conservative era through the opinions of a group of Home Counties dinner party guests”. Has been described as a “candid film (which) caused a stir because of the unpalatable views expressed by its subjects. Racism and homophobia were openly on display”. The controversy began before broadcast, as information about the programme circulated among the UK press. One journalist noted that, “Carefully orchestrated advance publicity makes the mood of the programme clear – the…(e)ight are shown as mad, stupid, bigoted members of a doomed middle England whose booze-addled brains are good for little more than fitful dreams of Margaret Thatcher”. The programme contributors claimed they had been "stitched up" by Watson, a view supported by some reviewers. Months after broadcast, Watson, at the Edinburgh International Television Festival, defended the film, saying: "They knew they had said what they had said… One had said, 'Shoot the bastards', referring to immigrants and it had gone in the film." Watson denied the guests had been exploited while drunk, adding: "Some of the most excessive forms of expression were said sober". Channel 4 acknowledged that it had timed its broadcast to cause embarrassment to the Government just before the 1997 general election.

Convictions (BBC, 1998), broadcast under the 40 Minutes strand, was banned. [corroboration required].

Malcolm and Barbara: Love's Farewell (ITV, 2007), which follows the progression of Alzheimer disease in a middle-aged man (Malcolm Pointon) and its impact on his marriage, created the most controversial moment in Watson’s career. Controversy arose when a press statement released ahead of broadcast stated that the programme included footage of Malcolm Pointon's death. This triggered questions in the press about the ethics of filming death for a television programme. Events took an unexpected turn when it transpired that the sequence purportedly showing the death of Malcom Pointon, in fact, did not. This came to light in a statement made by Graham Pointon (the brother of Malcolm) that Malcolm died two and a half days after filming had concluded. This catapulted the programme into the wider controversy over media fakery, such as the recent discovery that the BBC had faked phone-ins on Comic Relief, Children in Need and Sport Relief. After some tense, behind-the-scenes negotiations between Watson and ITV, both parties acknowledged publicly that the programme did not feature Malcolm Pointon’s actual death. The film was broadcast with an extra line of commentary clarifying the final scene. The controversy continued to build when ITV launched a formal inquiry into the matter which blamed Watson for the misunderstanding, although it conceded that Watson had not acted with any deliberate intention to mislead. Watson, in response, said that he felt he had been "hung out to dry" by ITV. Barbara, Malcolm Pointon’s widow, defended Watson, stating that "Paul filmed Malcolm's last semi-conscious moments - and those were the most precious to me, because after that he just drifted into a coma and faded away...The film ends with a freeze frame, a still image, which very simply, very sensitively, and very poignantly sends the message Malcolm has died...end of story…Does it really matter whether it was two minutes, two days, or two weeks after that point? It doesn't alter the fact Malcolm died of this illness…And that's the message I wanted to get through - that Alzheimer's kills”. There was support for Watson among media commentators, one arguing that while his mistake had been in “allowing an ambiguity to develop before transmission…it's not as if he tricked the audience into spending millions voting on the moment of death”. The controversy surrounding the programme was deemed to have been unfortunate “since the film is a fine piece of work by a film maker of rare talent”.

== Watson on reality television ==
"Reality television broke all the rules - there's nothing wrong with that…The Impressionists did it, the Cubists did it, that's the nature of art. Look at me. When I came into television I was a boring young lefty and I was tired of the Oxbridge brigade talking to camera. Out of the way. Let me film it. Let people speak for themselves... But reality TV has become such basic film-making. The condescending bastards who make it think the public knows nothing about film-making, but the public watches more TV than the people out at dinner parties networking. We are dealing with a precious commodity - one of the great inventions of the 20th century. Television can get you into any home. But what happens now? Because of reality TV, 80 hospitals turned down my request to make (Rain in my Heart) - refusing television access to institutions which are spending taxpayers' money”. Docu-soaps, a flourishing and pernicious fad, seem to be sweeping all before them on British television. Night after night, the viewing millions can settle down to what are always billed as slices of real life, with real people engaged in the dramas of everyday existence. Real it rarely is, relevant it never is, but drama, yes – and cheap”.

Docusoaps "…sneered and didn't enrich our lives or understanding, even when dealing with serious hurt in Neighbours From Hell. Most of the time it was middle -class media people taking the piss out of people performing for their 15 minutes of fame".

== Self-shooting ==
From the late 1990s, Watson started shooting his own films, either partially or completely. In 2006, he stated that he'd “held the camera for my last six or seven films…It's so liberating…Camera crews are great for dramas and they play with the f-stop brilliantly, but they don't see your point of view. So I get access but worse picture quality”. Films in this category include:

- White Lives (Granada/Channel 4, 1998)
- Malcolm and Barbara: A Love Story (Granada/ITV, 1999).
- The Queen's Wedding (Channel 4, 2002)
- Desert Darlings (Priory Pictures/Channel 4, 2003).
- Rain In My Heart (BBC Two, 2006)
- Malcolm and Barbara: Love's Farewell (ITV Productions/ITV, 2007).

== Watson on editing ==
Watson has spoken about the importance of editing to his filmmaking. "There is only one element of filmmaking that I like passionately and that’s cutting. Editing is simply wonderful. It is the craft we must use bravely, to invigorate our documentary making."

Regarding the editing style that typifies his later work, of which Rain in my Heart is an exemplar, Watson said: "The development of this 'triple layering' as I call it, started in other films I've made. Malcolm and Barbara has moments. I know how to cut in a conventional way, but I like to break the rules. I do passionately believe that if you film something right, there is an energy in the shot that is not of your making, it is of your collecting. That's what holds the sequence together, regardless of the cutting style. It's not the easiest approach to cut like this. When I was learning about triple layering, we would work all day and at the end of the day I would say 'Shall we have a look at it?' and it was a pile of shit. At that point, a good editor will say 'I know what you want now, why don't you bugger off for an hour and I'll fiddle around with it. You go and make dinner.' And the magic is, when I come back, it’s what I wanted. But you need editors who’ve got the patience and the faith, the belief that what you are trying to express is better expressed in this seemingly oddball garble. Triple layering hasn’t been used enough because we have the most timid filmmakers in this country; too many directors are too timid. There are no cutaways at all in Rain [in my Heart], for example, no meaningful shot of the mantelpiece or the bill behind the clock, unless it was integral to the story."

== Watson on Watson ==
"I used to be a painter. Now I make paintings in moving images called films. I'm an artist. And I know that's the wrong word to use for television. It's a shite word, it's not what we're meant to be, we're meant to be hard businesspeople making a product. I just don't fit into that pattern. And if it does look odd, that's because I am odd. And how I look at the world is reflected in my films."

"I'm the last of the living dinosaurs. Serious film-making has disappeared."

"There is no such thing as a balanced film. I pick out from the hours of shooting what suits my purpose. I'm an author."

"… if you're a film-maker, you're meant to be subversive."

"The people in my films are like buds on a branch. And I hope that under the heat of my gaze they open up and flower."
