= Sandor Elès =

Hungarian-British actor (1936–2002)

Sándor Éles
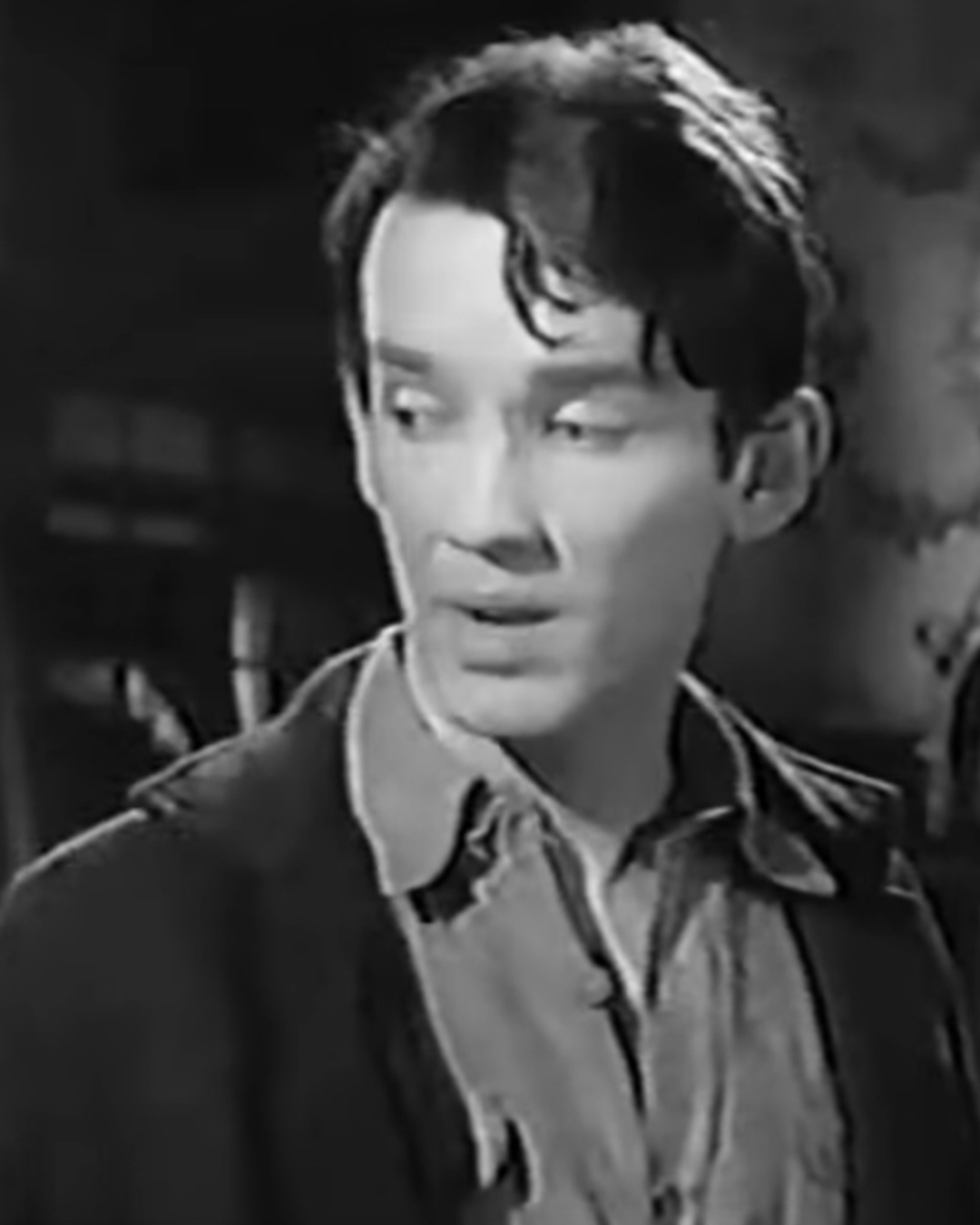
- Éles in an episode of One Step Beyond (1961)
- Born: József Sándor Éles; 15 June 1936; Tatabánya, Hungary
- Died: 10 September 2002 (aged 66); Kilburn, London, England
- Education: Bristol Old Vic Theatre School
- Occupation: Actor
- Years active: 1958–1996

József Sándor Éles (Hungarian: Éles József Sándor; 15 June 1936 – 10 September 2002) was a Hungarian-British actor. He started his career in theatre, but was best known latterly for TV and film work.

== Early life ==
Born in Tatabánya, 60 km from Budapest, Éles was orphaned during World War II, and emigrated to Britain during the Hungarian Revolution of 1956. He studied acting at the Bristol Old Vic Theatre School.

Éles became a naturalised British citizen on 10 January 1977.

== Career ==
Éles began his acting career on stage, and went on to appear in a host of television roles, the majority on ITV. These included the ITC series The Avengers, Danger Man, The Baron, The Saint, Timeslip and Jason King.

He appeared as a storyteller on the BBC children's programme Jackanory in ten episodes between 1970 and 1972, and he also made appearances in The Avengers, The Professionals, Strange Report and Upstairs, Downstairs. Often cast in generic 'foreigner' roles (diplomats, waiters, desk clerks), he most often played Frenchmen.

One of his most memorable film roles was as the mysterious Paul in the Brian Clemens thriller And Soon the Darkness (1970). He also had major roles in the Hammer Horror movies Countess Dracula (1971) and The Evil of Frankenstein (1964) as well as appearing for four years in the 1980s as the scheming restaurant manager, Paul Ross, in the British TV soap opera Crossroads.

In 1996, Éles returned to his cultural roots, appearing as the narrator in the Bartók opera, Bluebeard's Castle. The concert performances, given by the Berlin Philharmonic Orchestra under Bernard Haitink, were recorded for CD.

== Death ==
Éles died in Kilburn, London on 10 September 2002, aged 66, apparently from a heart attack.

== Filmography ==
Year	Title	Role	Notes
1961	The Rebel	Artist	
1961	The Naked Edge	Manfridi St John	
1962	Guns of Darkness	Lt. Gomez	
1964	French Dressing	Vladek	
1964	The Evil of Frankenstein	Hans	
1965	San Ferry Ann	Shop Attendant	
1967	The Magnificent Two	Armandez	
1970	The Kremlin Letter	Lt. Grodin	
1970	And Soon the Darkness	Paul	
1971	Countess Dracula	Lt. Imre Toth	
1971	Fun and Games	Paul Floret	
1973	Scorpio	Malkin	
1975	Love and Death	Soldier 2	
1977	The Assignment	Clerk	
1978	The Greek Tycoon	Lawrence	
1991	Sherlock Holmes and the Leading Lady	Maitre D'	
1996	Surviving Picasso	Party Guest	(final film role)
