= December Flower =

- Written by: Judy Allen
- Directed by: Stephen Frears
- Starring: Jean Simmons; Mona Washbourne; Pat Heywood; Bryan Forbes; June Ritchie; Ann-Marie Gwatkin; Richard Warner; Richard Hope; Christopher Fulford

Production
- Producer: Roy Roberts
- Production company: Granada Television

Original release
- Release: December 1984

December Flower is a British single drama first broadcast at Christmas 1984.

== Plot ==
Newly widowed Etta Marsh goes to visit her elderly Aunt, Mary Grey, whom she has never met. (Mary and her sister, Etta's mother, had not seen each other for some 60 years - after Mary "stole" Etta's mother's boyfriend, Harry's father.) Etta finds her 85-year-old "Aunt M" being looked after by an inattentive, selfish cook-housekeeper called Mrs. Cullen. Aunt M herself is extremely inattentive and listless because Mrs. Cullen keeps her sedated with pills. Her son is too wrapped up in his own life to be interested and his wife is only waiting for the old woman to die so they will inherit her property. Her granddaughter Jill is the only one, besides Etta, who displays any genuine affection for the old woman.

On the last day of Etta's visit, she and Mrs. Cullen have a row over what the latter has been giving Mrs. Grey to eat - or, rather, what she has not been feeding Mrs. Grey but keeping for herself to eat on her own. Mrs. Cullen quits, cousin Harry is distraught, and Etta promises to stay until he can sort out a new cook-housekeeper or Mrs. Cullen agrees to return.

However, once Mrs. Cullen is gone and Aunt M is no longer being fed sleeping pills in place of food, the old woman begins to perk up. She and Etta strike up a tremendous friendship, and Aunt M takes revenge on her snooty daughter-in-law by inviting the family over to admire her new Mickey Mouse telephone and have tea and cakes - served on rotating musical cake stand.

Harry and Etta are both pleased for Etta to stay and look after his mother. Harry's wife is not and drops a vitriolic bombshell: "Mother and your mother were adopted. You're not really related. You can call her 'Aunt' if you want to but she isn't your aunt!"

There is some foundation for her concern. When Mary dies, Etta is shocked to learn that Aunt M had made a new will leaving everything to her instead of to her son. Etta receives assurances from Mary's attending physician that, her "Aunt died of a massive coronary that was coming in any case. If anything, what you did prolonged her life; and you certainly brightened the end of it beyond all recognition." Etta then arranges to put most of the money and other assets in trust for her niece, Aunt M's granddaughter, Jill.

The closing scene is in the cemetery where Aunt M is buried. A large white marble statue has been erected in her memory, and the caretaker has instructions to replenish its floral arrangements on a weekly basis. "Only orange flowers?" he asks. Etta smiles and replies, "Orange flowers, yes!".

== Reception ==
In a positive review for The New York Times, John J. O'Connor wrote, "Jean Simmons and Mona Washbourne positively illuminate 'December Flower,'an hourlong tale about a newly widowed woman coming to take care of her bed-ridden, 85-year-old aunt. [...] 'December Flower,' written by Judy Allen from her own novel, skilfully manages to be amusing while never flinching from real problems. [...] Miss Simmons, whose film career has encompassed everything from Ophelia in Olivier's 'Hamlet' to Sister Sarah in 'Guys and Dolls,' has rarely been lovelier and more effective. Her Etta is an immensely appealing woman of sensitivity and authority. Miss Washbourne, the veteran character actress who started out professionally as a concert pianist, is an utter delight, whether trying on different sets of false teeth or squinting at the world around her with an unmistakable glint of mischief. 'December Flower' is small, lean and delightful."
