= Studiocanal Films =

British-French film studio and distributor

- Formerly: EMI-Elstree (1969–1970); MGM-EMI (1970–1973); Anglo-EMI Film Distributors (1971–1973); EMI Film Distributors (1973–1979); Thorn EMI Screen Entertainment (1979–1986); Cannon Screen Entertainment (1986–1988); Lumiere Pictures and Television (1992–1996); UGC DA (1996–1997); Canal+ Image International (1997–2012)
- Type: Subsidiary
- Industry: Film studio
- Predecessor: Associated British Productions; Anglo-Amalgamated
- Founded: 1969; 57 years ago
- Founder: Bryan Forbes
- Defunct: 2000; 26 years ago (as a company); 2006; 20 years ago (as a home video label in the UK)
- Fate: Acquired and merged by StudioCanal
- Successor: StudioCanal; StudioCanal UK
- Headquarters: London, United Kingdom; Paris, France
- Area served: Worldwide
- Key people: Jean Cazes (chairman/CEO); Alastair Waddell (chief executive); Chris Cary (Head of Business Development); Ralph Kamp (Theatrical Sales); Christine Ghazarian (Head of Overseas Sales, Paris Office); Alison Trumpy (TV Sales Manager); Martin Bigham (Technical Operations); Jamie Carmichael (TV Sales)
- Products: Motion pictures
- Owner: Cannon Screen Entertainment: EMI (1969–1979); Thorn EMI (1979–1986); The Cannon Group, Inc. (1986–1988); Weintraub Entertainment Group: The Coca-Cola Company; US Tobacco Company; Columbia Pictures (15%; 1987–1989); Warner Bros. (15%; 1989–1990); Lumiere Pictures and Television: Caisse des dépôts et consignations (54%;); Credit Lyonnais (5%;); Euro Clinvest (6.5%;); France Telecom (18%;); UAP (8%;); Jean Cazes (5%;); Time Warner (3.5%; 1995–1996); UGC (1996); Groupe Canal+ (1996–2000)
- Subsidiaries: France Animation; Pixibox
- Website: www.studiocanal.com

Studiocanal Films (formerly known as EMI Films, Thorn EMI Screen Entertainment, Lumiere Pictures and Television,UGC DA and Canal+ Image International) was a British-French film, television, animation studio and distributor. A former subsidiary of the EMI conglomerate, the corporate name was not used throughout the entire period of EMI's involvement in the film industry, from 1969 to 1986, but the company's brief connection with Metro-Goldwyn-Mayer and Anglo-EMI, the division under Nat Cohen, and the later company as part of the Thorn EMI conglomerate (following the merger with Thorn) are outlined here.

The library passed through the hands of several companies over the following years and is now owned by StudioCanal, a former sister company to Universal Music Group and parent company Canal+ Group's acquisition of European cinema operator UGC who acquired the library's then-owner, the United Kingdom-based Lumiere Pictures and Television in 1996, via Cannon Films. EMI Films also owned Elstree Studios in Hertfordshire, England; in turn, Cannon ended up purchasing the studio as well, but later sold it to Brent Walker in 1988, who in turn ended up selling half of the EMI Elstree Studios site to Tesco for a supermarket. Hertsmere Council eventually acquired the remaining portion in 1996, and, as of 2018, continues to operate it as a film and television studios centre.

== EMI Films ==
=== Bryan Forbes and Nat Cohen ===
The company was formed after the takeover of Associated British Picture Corporation (ABPC) in 1969 by EMI, following the acquisition of Warner Bros.' shares in ABPC the previous year. At the time ABPC owned 270 ABC Cinemas, a half share in the ITV contractor Thames Television, Elstree Studios at Shenley Road in Borehamwood, Hertfordshire, and had recently bought Anglo-Amalgamated, a film studio in which Nat Cohen had been a partner.

EMI moved into film production with the foundation of a new company, EMI-Elstree. Bernard Delfont appointed writer-director Bryan Forbes as the head of production at Elstree in April 1969 for three years at £40,000 a year, plus a percentage of the profits. As part of the general shake up of EMI, Nat Cohen was appointed to the Board. According to Filmink this led to "two competing fiefdoms" at EMI.

EMI announced they would make 28 films for $36 million—13 of these would be from Cohen's unit for £7 million, the rest from Forbes'. Bernard Delfont called it "probably the most ambitious program ever undertaken by a British film company."

Forbes announced his intention to make a variety of films at Elstree, steering away from what he called the "pornography of violence." He claimed EMI would make 14 films in 18 months with such stars as Peter Sellers and Roger Moore at a cost of £5–10 million in total. His aim was to keep budgets down and create a varied slate which would increase the chances of appealing to audiences and making a sufficient return to continue productions.

In August 1969 Forbes announced his slate of fifteen projects, including:

- Hoffman (starring Peter Sellers, directed by Alvin Rakoff)
- And Soon the Darkness
- The Man Who Haunted Himself
- The Go-Between, directed by Joseph Losey from a script by Harold Pinter
- The Breaking of Bumbo, directed by Kevin Brownlow and Andrew Mollo
- The Feathers of Death, directed by Richard Attenborough from a story by Simon Raven (unproduced)
- A film of a script by Richard Condon directed by John Bryson (unproduced)
- An adaptation of The Railway Children directed by Lionel Jeffries
- A Fine and Private Place, directed by Paul Watson
- An adaptation of the novel The Bitter Lollipop by John Quigly
- An adaptation of the novel Candidate of Promise by Dennis Barker
- The Barnardo Boys, a musical about Dr. Barnardo with music by Michael Lewis
- Question of Innocence, from a script by Julian Bond based on a story by Roger Moore
- Dulcima, directed by Frank Nesbitt with John Mills
- Mr. Forbush and the Penguins

"This is the first serious effort to revitalize the British film industry in 20 years", said Forbes. He added, "We intend to give youth a chance and not merely pay lip service to it. This is our first program and it won't be our last."

In November 1969 Nat Cohen and Bernard Delfont announced a slate of eight more films for EMI including:

- The Impotent, starring Carol White and Malcolm McDowell (unproduced)
- The Practice, from the novel by Stanley Winchester (unproduced)
- The Burden of Proof, from a novel by James Barlow (this later became Villain)
- Percy, the story of a penis transplant
- Jam Today, from a novel by Susan Baratt (unproduced)
- My Family and Other Animals, from a book by Gerald Durrell and produced by Michael Medwin (unproduced)
- Wise Child, from Simon Gray's stage play (unproduced)
- A film starring Julie Christie (unproduced)
- A film directed by John Schlesinger (unproduced)

The first few films of Forbes' regime performed poorly commercially: Eyewitness, Hoffmann, And Soon the Darkness and The Man Who Haunted Himself (starring Moore). The Breaking of Bumbo (all 1970), and Mr. Forbush and the Penguins (1971) flopped and A Fine and Private Place was abandoned. Forbes clashed with Bernard Delfont and their American backers, in this case Columbia, over the artistic and commercial value of director Joseph Losey's film The Go-Between (1970). Forbes was also criticised within EMI for directing his own film, The Raging Moon (US: Long Ago, Tomorrow, 1971). The Railway Children (1970) and Tales of Beatrix Potter (1971) were Forbes' only hits.

The company was affected with labour problems. Forbes felt as though he did not have the support of the EMI board, arguing that he never had the funds to market his films, in contrast with those available to Anglo-EMI, which was headed by Nat Cohen.

Defont wrote "Nat resented the implication that his films were somehow less worthy than those appearing under the Elstree banner, the more so because his films made a lot of money. In Wardour Street, where Nat had his power base, the talk was of Bryan Forbes enjoying the luxury of spending what Nat and his friends earned. Delfont acknowledged the differences between the men "went deeper" with Forbes feeling British films should be made for British audiences whereas Cohen aimed for bigger budgeted movies that had international appeal. "I was split between the two," wrote Delfont. "My heart was with Bryan Forbes: I wanted him to succeed. But as director of EMI with a responsibility to shareholders and the workforce, I had to accept that Nat Cohen was talking practical common sense." Delfont also felt Forbes program "would have taken an investment of time and money which was out of all proportion to likely return."

Forbes resigned in March 1971, after committing himself to a no-redundancy policy. He had made eleven films in total for an estimated cost of £4 million. Although Forbes' regime was seen at the time to have been a commercial failure, he later claimed that by 1993 his £4 million program of films had eventually brought EMI a profit of £16 million. (In 1994 he said the profit was £18 million from 18 films.) Linsday Anderson later wrote:

Bryan Forbes was a fighter, and he did his best to discipline the oldfashioned, small-minded labour force. But the penny-pinching, unimaginative management was just as bad. The £4,000,000 ‘revolving production fund’ was never forthcoming. Worst of all was the ‘respectable’ taste which dictated the choice of projects. However urgent the pressure, the new Elstree should not have kicked off with duds like The Man Who Haunted Himself (Roger Moore) or Hoffman (Peter Sellers). Most horribly significant was the grudging, purblind treatment of Bryan's own excellent The Raging Moon, which made only too clear the intransigent mediocrity of the people in key positions. Thus, what was probably the last chance of saving the British film industry was lost.

Editor Teddy Darvas later observed:

It was a great tragedy that Bryan failed. Part of the reason I think was that he got himself very much involved in little things instead of letting John Hargreaves, who was his number two, to run the studio like Korda would allow Lew Thornburn to run the studio and would only go in on major matters. Also, because he, as a director... had been interfered with so much by front office he felt that, when he gave people the money to make a film, it shouldn't interfere and because of that he gave young people a chance and brought in, sometimes inexperienced technicians. And because he didn't interfere, a lot of those films under his reign were flops, also he was told to make so many films instead of being told you have got money to make a number of films when you get the right story. A lot of films, I think, were made for the sake of being made.

Among the films Forbes wished to make but was unable to during his time at Elstree were an adaptation of Graham Greene's play The Living Room, to be directed by Michael Powell; a musical about the Barnardo Boys; and The Loud, Loud Silence a post-apocalyptic story from Richard Condon. He turned down Ned Kelly (1970) because its projected budget was too high.

=== MGM-EMI ===
In April 1970, EMI struck up a co-production agreement with Metro-Goldwyn-Mayer. The Hollywood studio announced they would sell their Borehamwood facility ("MGM-British Studios") and move their equipment to EMI's Elstree studio. MGM and EMI would then distribute and produce films in co-operation through a joint venture to be called MGM-EMI. and MGM began to finance some of EMI's productions. EMI's studio complex was renamed EMI-MGM Elstree Studios while a film distribution company MGM-EMI Distributors Ltd. was formed as part of the co-production agreement. This company, headed by Mike Havas would handle domestic distribution of MGM and EMI-produced films in the United Kingdom.

It was originally announced that MGM-EMI would make six to eight films a year, but they ended up producing far fewer. Forbes was given the title of managing director of MGM-EMI to add to his existing title of head of production. In July 1970 MGM-EMI announced they would make four co-productions: The Go-Between, Get Carter, The Boyfriend and The Last Run directed by John Boorman. Of these only the last was not made (It was eventually made with Richard Fleischer directing as a MGM film with no EMI involvement except for UK distribution).

MGM pulled out of the amalgamation in 1973, and became a member of CIC, which took over international distribution of MGM produced films. At this point the distribution company became EMI Film Distributors Ltd., and EMI-MGM Elstree Studios reverted to EMI-Elstree Studios.

=== Nat Cohen ===
EMI's other filmmaking division, Anglo-EMI Film Distributors Ltd, which had come out of Anglo-Amalgamated, was run autonomously by Nat Cohen. This wing of the company had released films such as Percy (1971). They also financed and distributed a series of films made by Hammer Film Productions, which partly came about through Bernard Delfont's friendship with James Carreras. There was an initial agreement to make three films, then an agreement to make nine movies over three years at a cost of around £200,000 each.

Nat Cohen took over Forbes' responsibilities as head of production after his resignation in 1971. Cohen backed productions intended for international success, and EMI had a more obviously commercial outlook. In October 1971, EMI's chairman John Read admitted the film division had performed disappointingly. "Profits were negligible last year and we felt it was desirable to make one or two provisions to write off some of the costs." However films like On the Buses and Up Pompeii (both 1971) performed well in relation to their budgets. "The experts say you're doing well if you make money out of one in three films", said Read. "We see filmmaking as a significant profit earner in the future."

Cohen was responsible for overseeing about 70% of the films produced in the UK during 1973, following a significant decline in domestic projects overall. In particular, long-term duopoly rival Rank had by now greatly reduced its own investment in British film production to a token presence. Cohen was not unaware of the problems inherent in his dominant position. Meanwhile, dependent on support from the most profitable parts of EMI, the company's financial position meant that they had to avoid backing any risky productions.

In May 1973, Cohen announced a £3 million production slate of movies including an adaptation of Swallows and Amazons (1974) and a sequel to Alfie (1966) released as Alfie Darling (1975).

The greatest success of Cohen's regime was Murder on the Orient Express (1974), which Cohen later claimed was the first British movie fully financed by a British company to reach the top of the American box office charts.

In July 1975, Cohen announced a £6 million programme of eleven new films:

- Aces High
- Evil Under The Sun (this later was replaced by Death on the Nile)
- Sergeant Steiner (later retitled Cross of Iron)
- Seven Nights in Japan
- To The Devil A Daughter
- film spin offs of the TV series The Sweeney and The Likely Lads
- All Things Bright And Beautiful (later retitled It Shouldn't Happen to a Vet)
- Spanish Fly
- A remake of Kind Hearts and Coronets with Dick Emery (never made)
- The Nat King Cole Story (never made)

Cohen resigned as chairman on 31 December 1977.

=== Michael Deeley and Barry Spikings ===
In May 1976, the company purchased British Lion Films and the two men who ran British Lion, Michael Deeley and Barry Spikings, became joint managing directors of EMI Distributors, with Nat Cohen remaining as chairman and chief executive. They also joined the EMI board, headed by Bernard Delfont. Delfont claimed "I squared it with Nat Cohen. Unlike the appointment of Bryan Forbes, there was no risk of the deal cutting across his interests. As chairman and chief executive of EMI Films Distribution he was kept happy with a revolving fun of six million pounds for a series of productions."

Deeley and Spikings's method was to only make a film if at least half the budget was put up by an American studio, reducing their financial risk although making the studio's product less obviously British. They focused on movies with international appeal – i.e. action films – and major stars. Deeley stated, “EMI could have continued the policy we’ve operated in Britain up to now. Making a big British picture like Murder on the Orient Express every two or three years and then falling back into small, local pictures, in some cases spin offs from TV series meant for the home market for the rest of the time.”

The initial Deeley-Spikings slate included three films shot in the US, with $18 million in all" The Deer Hunter, Convoy and The Driver (all 1978). They also made three British-based films, Death on the Nile (1978), Warlords of Atlantis (1978) and Sweeney 2 (1978). Films announced but not made include The Last Gun and Chinese Bandit.

EMI also signed an agreement to invest $5 million in Columbia films. They picked Close Encounters of the Third Kind, The Deep and The Greatest (all 1977) and The Cheap Detective. Delfont says this was done in order to purchase Screen Gems, a company of Columbia, but the deal proved lucrative with only The Greatest not making money.

In July 1976, EMI bought Roger Gimbel's production company, Tomorrow Enterprises, and formed EMI Television, headed by Gimbel. They made a large number of American TV movies like The Amazing Howard Hughes (1977) and Deadman's Curve (1978).

EMI backed out of funding Life of Brian (1979) at the last moment, after Bernard Delfont read the script and objected to its treatment of religion.

In April 1978, EMI announced they would make films with the newly formed Orion Pictures, including Arabian Adventure (1979) and other projects.

Michael Deeley left EMI in 1979 but Barry Spikings remained in charge of film production.

=== Spikings, AFD and Thorn-EMI merger ===
Spikings announced a slate of films under his auspices: The Jazz Singer with Neil Diamond, The Elephant Man (both 1980), Honky Tonk Freeway (1981) Franco Zeffirelli's biopic of Maria Callas, Discoland (which became Can't Stop the Music), The Awakening, and The Knight directed by Ridley Scott.

Delfont created a new company, Associated Film Distribution, to distribute films of EMI and ITC, then controlled by Lew Grade, his brother. This has been called "an utterly foolish move." EMI's film division was renamed Thorn EMI Screen Entertainment, to reflect EMI's merger with Thorn Electrical Industries to become Thorn EMI in 1979.

In March 1980, EMI were only making one film in Britain The Mirror Crack'd, which was released at the end of the year, but was a box-office failure. Lord Delfont announced that the company had purchased two British scripts, The Defense by John Mortimer and Off the Record by Frederick Forsyth. He admitted that sixty percent of the company's film budget would be spent in America the following year but "100% of the profits would come to this country... We have got to make films we believe are international, to get the money to bring exports back to this country."

In February 1981, Barry Spikings announced a slate of films worth £70 million, including Honky Tonk Freeway, Memoirs of a Survivor, Comrades and The Knight (now a Walter Hill film). The latter was not made.

In March 1981, Spikings admitted AFD has not "gotten off to a flying start" and would be wound up, with Universal taking over distribution of EMI Films. He argued that "production and distribution are not linked" and pointed to the five Oscars that EMI films had earned. In particular, Can't Stop the Music, Honky Tonk Freeway, and Raise the Titanic had been box-office failures.

Also in 1981, Thorn EMI entered the fast-growing home video market as Thorn EMI Video, featuring an initial line-up of 14 titles (The Tubes Video, April Wine Live in London, I Am a Dancer, Can't Stop the Music, Times Square, Death on the Nile, The Cruel Sea, The Day the Earth Caught Fire, The Best of Benny Hill, Scars of Dracula, Sophia Loren: Her Own Story, S.O.S. Titanic, The Royal Wedding, and Queen: Greatest Flix). The division was primarily active in both the UK and the US, as well as in Australia. In addition to Thorn EMI's own material, the division licensed titles from other companies, mostly those who had no home video division at the time, including New Line Cinema, Orion Pictures, Carolco Pictures and Hemdale Film Corporation.

=== Verity Lambert ===
In January 1983, Barry Spikings left the company and Verity Lambert was appointed head of production. Gary Dartnall became executive chairman. Lambert's first slate was Slayground, Comfort and Joy, Illegal Aliens (which became Morons from Outer Space) and Dreamchild. Lambert said they aimed to make five films a year ranging in budget from $5 to $10 million.

On 1 March 1983, EMI Films filed a lawsuit against United Artists, whereas EMI would finance WarGames, and UA would receive North American rights, while EMI received international rights to the film and pay $4.5 million delivery.

November 1984 saw Thorn EMI Video's US division form a partnership with pay television company HBO; the company then became known as Thorn EMI/HBO Video. The deal saw HBO take a stake in the venture and contribute their own productions for video distribution.

In December 1984, Thorn EMI offered investors the chance to invest in several films by issuing £36 million worth of shares. The films were A Passage to India (1984), Morons from Outer Space, Dreamchild, Wild Geese II and The Holcroft Covenant (all 1985). These films are currently under the ownership of Amazon MGM Studios due to this financing structure allowing The Cannon Group to retain the rights separately from Thorn EMI.

In March 1985, Thorn-EMI announced they would set up a production fund worth $175 million to make around twenty films. Film Finance Director John Reiss said the fund would be used as loans for filmmakers or to invest in films budgeted around $13–14 million. Reiss said that the films would be made for international audiences. On 15 May 1985, Thorn EMI Screen Entertainment made an agreement with Gladden Entertainment whereas Thorn EMI would release Gladden's films for international theatrical distribution.

Lambert resigned in July 1985. After this TESE wound down its in-house production arm and relied on films from independent outfits. That month, TESE signed a deal with French distributor AAA for a 30-month output of the entire British film library, serving 20 films, and did not want to cover all home video rights. On 6 August 1985, Thorn EMI Screen Entertainment agreed deals with various production outfits such as John Bradbourne and Richard Goodwin, Jeremy Thomas, Euan Lloyd and Chris Chrisafis, Verity Lambert and Simon Perry in order to gave the independent outfits "complete freedom" to develop motion pictures. The last films made under Lambert's watch were Clockwise and Link.

On 20 August 1985, Thorn EMI Screen Entertainment and Universal Pictures, which was distributing EMI's films ever since 1981 after acquiring Associated Film Distribution elected to dissolve the U.S. partnership by mutual consent.

Lambert recalled in 1997: "the person who hired me left, and the person who came in didn't want to produce films and didn't want me. While I managed to make some films I was proud of... Dreamchild, and Clockwise... it was terribly tough and not a very happy experience. But I was determined to see out my three-year contract. By the end I'd had enough of corporate life and wanted to see what I could do as an independent."

=== Denouement ===
In November 1985, Thorn EMI Screen Entertainment was placed up for sale with interested buyers including Rank, Cannon, Robert Maxwell, Heron Communications, and a management buyout led by Gary Dartnall. The following month, in December 1985, it accepted a £110 million ($161.7 million) management offer to place the entire Thorn EMI Screen Entertainment division up for sale. The company's division, British Lion Film Productions Ltd., which EMI bought in 1976, and all trademarks of the British Lion name, which was divested to a former staffer of the company, Peter Snell, of Britannic Film & Television.

In April 1986, Thorn EMI sold its film production and distribution arm (Thorn EMI Screen Entertainment), home video (Thorn EMI Video), and cinema (ABC Cinemas) operations to businessman Alan Bond. Bond, in turn, sold it to The Cannon Group a week later. A year after the purchase, a cash-strapped Cannon sold most of the film library to Weintraub Entertainment Group. They also sold their stake in the video venture inherited from Thorn EMI (which had been renamed as HBO/Cannon Video in the meantime), resulting in HBO running the video label alone from that point forward.

== Weintraub Entertainment Group ==
Weintraub Entertainment Group was formed on 1 July 1986 by Jerry Weintraub. In February 1987, WEG received $461 million in financing from Columbia Pictures, Cineplex Odeon and others in the form of securities, bank loans and advances. The Coca-Cola Company and US Tobacco were principal investors. WEG also arranged a $145-million, 7-year credit line with the Bank of America. WEG also signed a 20-year distribution deal with Columbia and planned to release seven or eight movies per year.

In March 1987, WEG signed its first production and distribution deal, a three-year agreement with Robert Stigwood's RSO Films for multiple films budgeted in the $12-million to $15-million range. With Stigwood's partnership, WEG was to finance a film version of Evita with Oliver Stone as writer/director and Meryl Streep as Eva Perón. However, the studio dropped the project.

WEG purchased from The Cannon Group in May 1987 its 2,000-title British film library, the Thorn-EMI Screen Entertainment library, for $85 million with $50 million from a loan. On 20 July Harry Usher joined the Group as President of the Weintraub International Enterprises division and as a senior vice president.

In January 1988, Barney Rosenzweig was hired as chairman of the television unit, corporate vice president and a member of the executive committee. In July, the Bank of America terminated its credit line with Weintraub after difficulties in syndicating parts of the loan to other banks due to the Thorn-EMI loan. The Group's first release was The Big Blue in August; it grossed $1.6 million the opening weekend.

In January 1989, Usher left his position as President of the Weintraub International Enterprises. The Bank of America and WEG established a new credit line for two years and $95 million with Crédit Lyonnais participating.

In 1989, as a result of Sony/Columbia hiring Peter Guber and Jon Peters away from Warner Bros., Sony/Columbia traded its 15% share in WEG.

In September 1990, WEG filed for Chapter 11 bankruptcy. Later that month, Jerry Weintraub left the company and forged a deal with Warner Bros., while Columbia still remained indebted to releasing WEG films.

Film Asset Holding Co., a company formed by WEG's two primary bank creditors, sued Weintraub over his structuring of a sale of the Peter Pan story to Sony Pictures Entertainment in the fall of 1990. Weintraub and Film Assets settled in January 1992.

In August 1998, a jury verdict for $7 million was lost by Bear Stearns to investors who had been misled by the brokerage's $83 million bond issue prospectus for the now-bankrupt Weintraub Entertainment Group.

After the company shut down its assets were reorganized into the WEG Acquisition Corp, and are currently held by Sony, while the television rights are controlled by Paramount Pictures.

== Lumiere Pictures and Television/UGC DA/Canal+ Image International ==
The earliest origins of Canal+ Image and StudioCanal were first founded on 5 August 1873 in Marseille, under the corporate name Nouvelle Compagnie Marseillaise de navigation à vapeur A. et L. Fraissinet et compagnie.

La Compagnie Fraissinet was a Marseille shipping company. During the 1960s, decolonization and competition with jet-powered air travel weakened the group's results and it ended up selling its maritime assets to the Chargeurs Réunis (United Shippers) in 1964.

In July 1981, Cyril de Rouvre made a surprise takeover bid on the struggling Fraissinet Company. Having become specialised in the maintenance and resale of business aircraft, Fraissinet-Transair became the Financière Robur in tribute to the hero of Jules Verne, Robur-le-Conquérant. The grandson of Antoine de Rouvre, who had begun cinema interests in the late 1920s, Cyril de Rouvre, brought together his film assets within Financière Robur: the Compagnie Française de cinématographie (CFC), the Consortium Financier pour la production de films (CFPF) and Coficiné, which specialised in the financing of production. Rouvre gradually separated from its industrial activities and then bought multiple film catalogues (Les Films Gibé, Les Films Corona, Silver Films) created in August 1987 via a new subsidiary, Robur Droits Audiovisuels.

On 30 June 1992, the Financière Robur merged its catalogue of films with that of UGC by absorbing UGC Droits Audiovisuels, its subsidiary founded in 1985. The UGC group takes control of the new company, the first catalogue of films in France with nearly 1500 feature films and 500 hours of audiovisual programmes.

In November 1993, UGC Droits Audiovisuels acquired United Communication, mainly holding the French-speaking rights of the MGM and United Artists catalogue, nearly 800 American films and 2,000 hours of television. The continued consolidation in January 1996 with the acquisition of the group Lumière de Jean Cazès, the second French catalogue of film and audiovisual rights, having itself acquired the British catalogue Weintraub (formerly Thorn EMI) in 1991, while Lumiere Pictures and Television formed earlier in 1992 as a merger between two French companies: Jean Cazes' Initial Groupe (est. 1984) and Investissements en Droits Audiovisuelles (est. 1987). Lumiere owned a substantial library of films from the Thorn EMI Screen Entertainment/Weintraub library, representing a third of all movies made in the UK from the beginning of silent pictures. Cazes then spun off Lumiere's Los Angeles branch into a new company, Lumiere International.

Later that year, in June, Canal+, in turn, acquired UGC Droits Audiovisuels, with the rights to more than 5,000 films. An alliance strongly encouraged by their common shareholder, the General of the Eaux, which holds both 25% of UGC Droits Audiovisuels and 20% of Canal+.

UGC Droits Audiovisuels and Canal+ D.A. was merged and renamed Canal+ Image International in June 1997, before the merger of the company StudioCanal with Le Studio Canal+ in 2000.

In the 1990s to early 2000s, Warner Home Video formerly handled the distribution of StudioCanal titles through the Canal+ Image label in the United Kingdom on VHS and DVD. However, its name in the UK was kept until 2006 when StudioCanal opened its distribution unit in the UK, with titles distributed through Optimum Releasing.

== Filmography ==
Lumiere Pictures and Television financed and produced films under several names and with a series of production partners. Below are the main ones:

=== Bryan Forbes ===
- Eyewitness (1970) (ABPC) (ITC)
- And Soon the Darkness (1970) (ABPC)
- Hoffman (1970) (ABPC)
- The Man Who Haunted Himself (1970) (ABPC)
- The Breaking of Bumbo (1970) (ABPC)
- The Railway Children (1970)
- Spring and Port Wine (1970)
- A Fine and Private Place (1970) (abandoned)
- The Raging Moon (1971)
- The Tales of Beatrix Potter (1971)
- The Go-Between (1971)
- Mr. Forbush and the Penguins (1971)
- Dulcima (1971)

=== Hammer co-productions ===
- On the Buses (July 1971)
- Blood from the Mummy's Tomb (October 1971)
- Mutiny on the Buses (June 1972)
- Straight on Till Morning (July 1972)
- Demons of the Mind (November 1972)
- Man at the Top (1973) (AE/H)
- Love Thy Neighbour (July 1973)
- Holiday on the Buses (December 1973)
- To the Devil a Daughter (March 1976) (H)

=== MGM-EMI ===
- Get Carter (1971) (ME)
- The Go-Between (1971) (ME) (Dist by C in USA)
- The Boy Friend (1971) (ME)

=== Nat Cohen/Anglo-EMI ===
- All the Way Up (1970) (AA)
- Spring and Port Wine (1970) (AA)
- Entertaining Mr Sloane (1970) (AA)
- The Body (1970) (AE)
- Percy (1971) (AE)
- Up Pompeii (1971) (AE)
- Villain (1971) (AE) – produced by Kanter, Ladd and Kastner
- Family Life (1971) (AE) – directed by Ken Loach
- Up the Chastity Belt (1972)
- Steptoe and Son (1972)
- I Am a Dancer (1972) (AE)
- Afternoon of a Champion (1972) (AE) (documentary)
- Up the Front (1972) (AE)
- Henry VIII and His Six Wives (1972) (AE)
- Endless Night (1972)
- Our Miss Fred (1972) (AE)
- Fear Is the Key (1972) – produced by Kanter, Ladd and Kastner (AE) (Dist by P in USA)
- Never Mind the Quality Feel the Width (1973)
- Baxter! (1973) (AE)
- Steptoe and Son Ride Again (1973)
- The Final Programme (1973) (AE)
- Take Me High (1973)
- The Dove (1974) (D) (Dist by P in USA)
- Our Cissy (1974) (short)
- Stardust (1974) (AE) (Dist by C in USA)
- Murder on the Orient Express (1974) (AE) (Dist by P in USA)
- Sunday in the Country (1974) (D)
- Monty Python and the Holy Grail (1975)
- All Creatures Great and Small (1975)
- Trick or Treat? (1976) (abandoned)
- The Likely Lads (1976)
- Spanish Fly (1976) (D)
- It Shouldn't Happen to a Vet (1976)
- Aces High (1976) (D)
- Seven Nights in Japan (1976) (P)
- Sweeney! (1977)
- Cross of Iron (1977) (A-E)
- Twenty Five Years (1977) (documentary)
- Welcome to Blood City (1977)

=== Co-productions with Columbia ===
- Nickelodeon (December 1976) - also with British Lion
- The Greatest (May 1977) – also with British Lion
- The Deep (June 1977)
- Close Encounters of the Third Kind (November 1977)
- The Cheap Detective (June 1978)

=== Michael Deeley and Barry Spikings regime ===
- Silver Bears (1977) (Dist by C in USA)
- Sweeney 2 (1978)
- Warlords of Atlantis (1978) (Dist by C in USA)
- Convoy (1978) – with United Artists
- The Driver (1978) – with 20th Century Fox
- Death on the Nile (1978) (Dist by P in USA)
- The Deer Hunter (1978) – with Universal (Inducted into the National Film Registry in 1996)

=== TV movies ===
- The Amazing Howard Hughes (April 1977)
- The Girl Called Hatter Fox (October 1977)
- Special Olympics (February 1978)
- Forever (January 1978)
- Deadman's Curve (February 1978)
- Just Me and You (May 1978)
- One in a Million: The Ron LeFlore Story (September 1978)
- Betrayal (November 1978)
- Steel Cowboy (December 1978)
- Lawman Without a Gun (December 1978)
- Deathmoon (May 1978)
- Lawman Without a Gun (1978)
- The Cracker Factory (March 1979)
- S.O.S. Titanic (September 1979)
- Survival of Dana (1979)
- Can You Hear the Laughter? The Story of Freddie Prinze (September 1979)
- Orphan Train (December 1979)
- The Dances Goes On (1980)
- Sophia Loren: Her Own Story (October 1980)
- My Kidnapper, My Love (December 1980)
- The Killing of Randy Webster (1981)
- Broken Promise (1981)
- The Manions of America (1981)
- A Piano for Mrs. Cimino (February 1982)
- A Question of Honor (1982)
- Coming Out of the Ice (1982)
- Deadly Encounter (1982)
- The Legend of Walks Far Woman (May 1982) (filmed 1979)
- Packin' It In (1983)

=== Barry Spikings ===
- Arabian Adventure (July 1979) – with British Lion – distributed by AFD
- The Crown Prince (1979)
- Can't Stop the Music (June 1980) – distributed by AFD
- The Awakening (October 1980) – with Orion – distributed by Warners
- Times Square (October 1980) – with Robert Stigwood, distributed by AFD
- The Elephant Man (October 1980) – with Brooksfilms – distributed by Columbia-EMI-Warner (UK), Paramount (US)
- The Jazz Singer (December 1980) – distributed by AFD
- The Mirror Crack'd (December 1980) – distributed by AFD
- Honky Tonk Freeway (August 1981) – distributed by AFD
- Evil Under the Sun (March 1982) – distributed by AFD
- Britannia Hospital (May 1982) – with British Lion, distributed by United Artists Classics
- Frances (December 1982) – with Brooksfilms, distributed by Universal
- Second Thoughts (February 1983) – distributed by Universal
- Bad Boys (March 1983) – distributed by Universal
- Tender Mercies (Mar 1983) – distributed by Universal
- Strange Invaders (Sep 1983) – distributed by Orion
- Cross Creek (May 1983) – with Universal, distributed by AFD, Universal
- Handgun (May 1983, produced in 1981) - distributed by WB

=== Verity Lambert ===
- Slayground (December 1983) - distributed by Universal
- Comfort and Joy (August 1984) - with Kings Road, distributed by Universal
- Not for Publication (November 1984) - distributed by The Samuel Goldwyn Company
- A Passage to India (December 1984) - with HBO, distributed by Columbia
- Morons from Outer Space (March 1985) - distributed by Universal
- Restless Natives (June 1985) - distributed by Orion Classics
- Dreamchild (October 1985) - distributed by Universal
- Wild Geese II (October 1985) - distributed by Universal
- The Holcroft Covenant (October 1985) - distributed by Universal
- Highlander (March 1986) - distributed by 20th Century-Fox
- Clockwise (March 1986) - distributed by Universal
- Link (March 1986) - distributed by Universal

=== Later films ===
- The Manhattan Project (June 1986) (TESE) - with Gladden Entertainment, distributed by 20th Century-Fox
- It Couldn't Happen Here (July 1988)
- Interstella 5555: The 5tory of the 5ecret 5tar 5ystem (May 2003) (D) (credited as "Virgin Music", a member of the EMI Group")
- AA = co-production with Anglo-Amalgamated
- ABPC = produced by Associated British Picture Corporation
- AE = as Anglo-EMI
- AFD = distributed by Associated Film Distributors
- C = co-production with Columbia Pictures
- D = distributor only
- H = co-production with Hammer Film Productions
- MGM = co-production with Metro-Goldwyn-Mayer
- Orion = co-production with Orion Pictures
- P = co-production with Paramount Pictures
- TESE = as Thorn EMI Screen Entertainment
- U = co-production with Universal
- UA = co-production with United Artists
- WB = co-production with Warner Bros.

=== Weintraub Entertainment Group ===
- The Big Blue (1988): distribution rights, $3 million
- Fresh Horses (1988): first original production, grossed only $7 million
- My Stepmother Is an Alien (1988): $26 million budget, grossed $13.8 million
- The Karen Carpenter Story (1989): a TV movie release on CBS
- Listen to Me (1989)
- She's Out of Control (1989)
- Troop Beverly Hills (1989)
- The Gods Must Be Crazy II (1989)

== See also ==
- Lumière (Brazilian film company)

== Notes ==
- Forbes, Bryan, A Divided Life, Mandarin Paperbacks, 1993
- Walker, Alexander, Hollywood England, Harrap and Stein, 1974
- Walker, Alexander, National Heroes: British Cinema in the Seventies and Eighties, Harrap, 1985
- Walker, Alexander, Icons in the Fire: The Rise and Fall of Practically Everyone in the British Film Industry 1984–2000, Orion Books, 2005. ISBN 978-0-7528-6484-6.
