= My Kidnapper, My Love =

My Kidnapper, My Love is a 1980 American TV film from EMI Television.
