= And Soon the Darkness (1970 film) =

1970 British film by Robert Fuest

- Film poster
- Directed by: Robert Fuest
- Written by: Brian Clemens; Terry Nation
- Produced by: Albert Fennell; Brian Clemens
- Starring: Pamela Franklin; Michele Dotrice; Sandor Elès
- Cinematography: Ian Wilson
- Edited by: Ann Chegwidden
- Music by: Laurie Johnson
- Production companies: ABPC; EMI Elstree
- Distributed by: Warner-Pathé
- Release date: 5 July 1970
- Running time: 94 minutes
- Country: United Kingdom
- Language: English
- Budget: £260,000

And Soon the Darkness is a 1970 British thriller film directed by Robert Fuest from a screenplay by Brian Clemens and Terry Nation, and starring Pamela Franklin, Michele Dotrice and Sandor Elès. The plot follows two British nurses on a cycling holiday in rural France; during their trip, one of them vanishes, and the other struggles to search for her in a rural community.

It was the first movie made under Bryan Forbes at EMI Elstree to be released (Hoffman had been produced first but was released later). Much of the film's production team had previously worked on the television series The Avengers. And Soon the Darkness was released by Warner-Pathe on 5 July 1970, to mixed reviews.

An American remake was released in 2010.

== Plot ==
Jane and Cathy are two young nurses from Nottingham who are taking a cycling holiday through rural France. While having lunch at a busy restaurant, Cathy notices a handsome man drinking alone at an adjacent table. Shortly after the women depart, the man also leaves the cafe on a Lambretta scooter. On a country road surrounded by farmland, the women are passed by the man on his scooter. Several minutes later, the women pass by him as he rests by a cemetery.

As the women pass through a small village, they encounter the man again. Cathy, who has grown tired of cycling, decides she wants to sunbathe, and stops at a wooded area along the road. Jane agrees to rest momentarily, but the two women get into an argument over the trip itinerary, and Jane decides to continue on alone. Jane soon arrives at a rural roadside cafe, where the proprietor, Madame Lassal, warns her that the area is dangerous and that she should not be travelling alone. Meanwhile, Cathy, still sunbathing, becomes unnerved and senses she is being watched. Upon trying to leave, she finds that someone has destroyed the wheel of her bicycle. Moments later, she is confronted by an unseen assailant.

Feeling guilty over leaving Cathy behind, Jane returns to the spot where she was sunbathing. She finds no sign of Cathy, apart from her camera lying in the grass. Moments later, the man the women saw earlier at the restaurant stops along the road on his scooter. He introduces himself as Paul, and Jane explains to him that she is looking for Cathy. Paul offers Jane a ride back to the village, where she believes Cathy may have gone. While questioning locals in town, Jane learns of an unsolved rape and murder of a young woman that occurred in the town three years before, described by an English schoolmistress as 'quite a scandal". Meanwhile, Paul rides into the woods on his scooter to search for Cathy.

As the schoolmistress is about to drive off, Jane persuades her to drive her part-way to meet the gendarme and report Cathy's disappearance. En route, the schoolmistress tells Jane the unsolved murder occurred in the same wooded area from which Cathy vanished. Unable to locate the gendarme, Jane returns to the roadside cafe and asks Madam Lassal for help, but she again urges Jane to leave the area. Jane again encounters Paul, who reveals he worked for the Surete and privately researched the case of the murdered woman. The two get into an argument when Jane discovers Paul has taken the film from Cathy's camera as evidence. Convinced he has hurt Cathy, Jane parts ways with him.

Running through the town on foot, Jane finally locates the residence of the gendarme, and explains what has occurred. The gendarme goes to investigate the scene, leaving Jane alone at his residence. Paul arrives at the house, but Jane refuses to open the door. When he breaks into the gendarme's home, Jane flees into the woods, where she stumbles upon an abandoned trailer park. While hiding in a camper, Jane finds Cathy's corpse. Paul manages to corner Jane in the woods, but she beats him in the face with a rock. At the edge of the abandoned trailer park, Jane finds the gendarme. Thankful to find the man she thinks will help her, she embraces him, but the gendarme begins to fondle her sexually. He then violently sexually assaults her, revealing himself to be the perpetrator. Jane attempts to fend him off, and is rescued by an injured Paul, who hits the gendarme with a large branch.

== Cast ==
- Pamela Franklin as Jane
- Michele Dotrice as Cathy
- Sandor Elès as Paul
- John Nettleton as The Gendarme
- Clare Kelly as The Schoolmistress
- Hana Maria Pravda as Madame Lassal
- John Franklyn as Old Man
- Claude Bertrand as M. Lassal
- Jean Carmet as Reiner
- André Maranne as Radio DJ (voice, uncredited)

== Production ==
=== Background ===
The film was made by the same production team as The Avengers television series. The screenplay was written by Brian Clemens and Terry Nation, both of whom had contributed to The Avengers, as had producer Albert Fennell and director Robert Fuest. Clemens says they "needed a change" after The Avengers and decided to make a thriller film.

Clemens said "after deciding to do a thriller we made things difficult for ourselves by insisting that all the action take place in broad daylight... It's very easy to frighten people in the dark because darkness itself is frightening but we thought it would be nice to frighten people in daylight." He reportedly wrote the script in two days. They attached the director Robert Fuest who Clemens said "had a great sense of style and color in his direction."

Clemens took the project to Bryan Forbes who had just been appointed head of production at EMI Films; the two men knew each other from working together on Station Six Sahara. Forbes liked the project and agreed to finance. It would be the first film made greenlit by Forbes. (The second was The Man Who Haunted Himself with Hoffman being the third.) Forbes later wrote in his memoirs, "One of my priorities [at EMI] was to encourage new directors who had previously been unable to get a break into feature films. This was a calculated risk, but one worth taking." He gave Robert Fuest on And Soon the Darkness as an example, calling it "a stylish thriller".

The film was announced in August 1969. It was part of an overall slate of fifteen films Forbes intended to make at EMI which cost between £5-10 million. This slate also included The Railway Children, The Breaking of Bumbo, John Quigly's The Bitter Lollipop, Dulcima, Dennis Barker's A Candidate of Promise, A Fine and Private Place, the musical The Bernado Boys, Simon Raven's The Feathers of Death, Mr. Forbush and the Penguins, The Go Between, an untitled Richard Condon script to be directed by John Bryson, and a second film from Roger Moore, based on his own story (with a script by Julian Bond) called A Question of Innocence, which Moore was to direct. (Some of these films were never made.)

=== Casting ===
The lead roles were given to Pamela Franklin and Michele Dotrice. Sandor Eles had been under contract to Bryan Forbes' company.

=== Filming ===
The film was shot entirely in France. Filming started on 19 August 1969 and finished by October. Shooting mostly took place in the village of Prénouvellon, 48 kilometres (30 mi) outside Orleans. Clemens directed second unit.

== Release ==
And Soon the Darkness premiered in the United Kingdom on 5 July 1970. It opened in the United States the following year, on 5 April 1971.

=== Home media ===
The film was released on DVD in the United Kingdom at the end of January 2008. In the United States, Kino Lorber issued a Blu-ray in 2019. Kino Lorber reissued the film in 4K UHD format as a double feature with Sudden Terror (1970) on 20 August 2024.

== Reception ==
=== Box office ===
The film did moderately well at the box-office in the United Kingdom and North America, but was not a big success - according to The Guardian the first three films of Forbes' regime "sunk without a trace". Alexander Walker said the films were criticised as square". Bernard Delfont called And Soon the Darkness, Hoffman and The Man Who Haunted Himself "the real dodos belly-flopping out of Elstree."

They got Forbes' regime at EMI off to a poor start from which it never really recovered.

Forbes later said of And Soon the Darkness and Dulcima (another EMI movie) "the cinema and distribution arms of the company showed no great enthusiasm for either film. Purely from a commercial standpoint it seemed an irresponsible waste of the shareholders’ money. Properly marketed with a little imagination and given a chance to succeed, their fate could have been quite different."

=== Critical response ===
Derek Malcolm of The Guardian said of the film: "I will be charitable and say nothing." The Daily Telegraph wrote "what exactly attracted him [Forbes] to this project, I wonder? The economy, perhaps? For there could have been nothing very money consuming in this little film... There is also, to my mind, very little probable story."

In 1971, The New York Times reviewer Roger Greenspun stated: "Until the disappearance and for a while afterward everything goes very well toward building tension with understated effects. But eventually, by mere repetition, the understated effects begin to look like poverty of the imagination. Then terror becomes a function of gratuitous camera technique, and danger the product of dishonest characterization."

Halliwell's Film Guide comments: "Slow, overstretched, often risible suspender ... long on red herrings and short on humour, but with some pretension to style."

Time Out described it as an "[u]nappealing women-in-peril thriller" which is "[p]redictable, implausible, and not a little nasty."

In contrast, the film was listed seventh in the Cinefantastique's list of the top ten sci-fi/horror films of the 1970s. Frederick S. Clarke, the magazine's editor, called it "a lady-in-distress picture that for suspense tops anything of its kind."

Clemens was involved in producing and storyboarding the film, and said it inspired him to try directing. He later commented, "My business partner (Albert Fennell) said 'You should have directed it' and suddenly I thought 'Yeah, perhaps I should have done'. I knew I could have directed it better." He wrote what became See No Evil for Forbes at EMI; after Forbes left the company the film was made at Columbia. Clemens eventually turned director with Captain Kronos, Vampire Hunter.

Critic Alexander Walker argued the film "was shot with the precision, and limited impact, of a television drama" adding it, Hoffmann and The Man who haunted Himself "were all films obviously rushed into production to get the studio shipshape again: Forbes couldn’t afford the luxury of waiting for the off-beat, or chancing an untested project. But it might have been better if he had. The three films were released ‘back to back’ (i.e. following each other in consecutive weeks) across the country — as E.M.I. had then no West End ‘showcase’ cinema — and coincided with the World Cup football play-offs, a heat wave, and a general election."

== Remake ==
An American remake of the film was released in 2010.

== Sources ==
- Dixon, Wheeler W. (2000). The Second Century of Cinema: The Past and Future of the Moving Image. Albany, New York: SUNY Press. ISBN 978-0-791-44515-0.
- Forbes, Bryan (1993). A Divided Life. Reading, Berkshire: Mandarin. ISBN 978-0-749-30884-1.
- Walker, Alexander (2005). Hollywood, England: The British Film Industry in the Sixties. London, England: Orion Books. ISBN 978-0-752-85706-0.
