= Bryan Forbes =

British filmmaker, writer, and actor (1926–2013)

Bryan Forbes CBE
- Born: John Theobald Clarke; 22 July 1926; Stratford, Essex, England
- Died: 8 May 2013 (aged 86); Virginia Water, Surrey, England
- Other name: Turk Thrust
- Education: Royal Academy of Dramatic Art
- Occupations: Film director, theatre director, producer, actor, writer
- Spouses: Constance Smith (m. 1951; div. 1955) Nanette Newman (m. 1955)
- Children: 2, including Emma
- Military career
- Allegiance: United Kingdom
- Branch: British Army
- Service years: 1944–1948
- Units: Intelligence Corps; Combined Forces Entertainment Unit
- Conflicts: World War II

Bryan Forbes (born John Theobald Clarke; 22 July 1926 – 8 May 2013) was an English filmmaker, theatre director, novelist, and actor, described as a "Renaissance man" and "one of the most important figures in the British film industry".

He wrote and/or directed several critically acclaimed films from the 1960s through the 1980s, including Whistle Down the Wind (1961), The L-Shaped Room (1962), Séance on a Wet Afternoon (1964), King Rat (1965), The Raging Moon (1971), The Stepford Wives (1975), and The Slipper and the Rose (1976). He also scripted several films directed by others, such as The League of Gentlemen (1960), The Angry Silence (1960), Only Two Can Play (1962), Hopscotch (1980), and Chaplin (1992). He was also head of production for EMI Films for a time.

Forbes' directorial debut Whistle Down the Wind was nominated for several BAFTA Awards, including Best Film and Outstanding British Film in 1962. Four of his other films were also nominated for BAFTA Awards, and was nominated for an Academy Award for Best Original Screenplay for The Angry Silence.

== Early life ==
Forbes was born John Theobald Clarke on 22 July 1926 in Queen Mary's Hospital, Stratford, East London. His father was a salesman and he grew up at 43 Cranmer Road, Forest Gate, where he was a pupil at West Ham Secondary School. During the Second World War he was evacuated twice, first to Lincolnshire – where he attended Horncastle Grammar School – and then to Porthleven in Cornwall, where he was looked after by the vicar Canon Edward Thornton Gotto and his wife. A schoolfriend at West Ham was artist Albert Herbert. Lionel Gamlin of the BBC took him on as the host of Junior Brains Trust, and invented Clarke's pseudonym of Bryan Forbes.

== Career ==
=== Actor and screenwriter ===
Forbes in the trailer for Quatermass 2 (1957)

Forbes trained as an actor at the Royal Academy of Dramatic Art from age 17, but completed only three terms. He completed four years of military service in the Intelligence Corps and Combined Forces Entertainment Unit, during which time he started to write short stories. After completing his military service in 1948, following British Equity rules, he was obliged to change his name to avoid confusion with actor John Clark. Forbes began to act, appearing on stage and playing numerous supporting roles in British films, in particular An Inspector Calls (1954) and The Colditz Story (1955).

He published a short story collection in the early 1950s, which induced producer "Cubby" Broccoli to offer him screenwriting work on The Black Knight (1954). He received his first credit for Second World War film The Cockleshell Heroes (1955), while other early screenplays include I Was Monty's Double (1958), and The League of Gentlemen (1960), his breakthrough. Directed by Basil Dearden, Forbes also starred. The film recounted a bank heist carried out by ex-army officers, and gained critical success, including his first BAFTA nomination.

In 1959, he formed a production company, Beaver Films, with his frequent collaborator Richard Attenborough. Beaver Films made The Angry Silence (1960), a controversial Bafta-winning screenplay by Forbes in which Attenborough took the lead role, and the two men shared production responsibilities.

=== Film director ===
Forbes's directorial debut came with Whistle Down the Wind (1961), again produced by Attenborough, a critically acclaimed film about three northern children who conceal a criminal in their barn, believing him to be a reincarnated Jesus Christ. It starred child actor Hayley Mills and Alan Bates, in one of his earliest film roles. The film was nominated for four BAFTA awards, including Best Film from any Source. It was the basis for a 1996 musical by Andrew Lloyd Webber. The L-Shaped Room (1962), his next film as director, with Leslie Caron in the female lead, led to her gaining a nomination for an Oscar, and winning the BAFTA (Best British Actress) and Golden Globe awards. Comments Phil Wickham: "It feels like half a new wave film – a mid-point between the innovation of the Woodfall Films and the mainstream of the British film industry."

Forbes wrote and directed Séance on a Wet Afternoon (1964), and the same year he wrote the third screen adaptation of the Somerset Maugham novel Of Human Bondage. In 1965, he went to Hollywood to make King Rat, a successful prisoner-of-war story. He followed this with The Wrong Box (1966) and The Whisperers (1967), the latter featuring Edith Evans. A caper film, Deadfall (1968), starred Michael Caine.

=== Head of EMI Films ===
Forbes was offered a three picture deal by Bernard Delfont who had just bought the film studio Associated British (soon to become EMI Films). Forbes refused, criticising Associated British; he wrote Delfont a paper about the state of the studio and how it should be run. Delfont hired him to be managing director at £30,000 a year.

Dennis Barker, in his obituary of Forbes for The Guardian, states, 'This amounted virtually to an attempt to revive the ailing British film industry by instituting a traditional studio system with a whole slate of films in play.' Forbes later said he went in with a "built in enemy" in the form of Nat Cohen who had also been offered the job, along with the "old guard" who did not like him. "

Under Forbes's leadership, the studio produced The Railway Children (1970), The Tales of Beatrix Potter (1971) and The Go-Between (1971), all successful. His tenure, though, was marked by financial problems and failed projects, and he resigned in 1971. Forbes had full autonomy over the films he made as long as they were below a certain amount but later said "I lacked power in the one area where it really matters - distribution."

Coinciding with his time at EMI Films, he resumed directorial work with The Raging Moon (1971), starring his wife, Nanette Newman, and Malcolm McDowell.

In 1994 Forbes claimed the 18 films he made at EMI for £4 million overall returned £18 million of profit to the studio, with only two of the films making a loss. (Forbes got 5% of the profit.)

== Later career ==
From the early 1970s, Forbes divided his energies between cinema, television, theatre, and writing. In 1972 he started work on the documentary Elton John and Bernie Taupin Say Goodbye Norma Jean and Other Things (1973), which chronicled the life of the young Elton John and Bernie Taupin. Taking a full year to complete, the project gave a behind-the-scenes look at the writing and recording of Goodbye Yellow Brick Road. Besides footage of John's 1973 Hollywood Bowl concert, the film included interviews with John, Taupin, and band members, including Nigel Olsson and Dee Murray, as well as John's mother, Sheila, DJM label chief Dick James, and James's son, Stephen. (Some of the concert footage was later licensed for the Eagle Vision Classic Albums series Goodbye Yellow Brick Road documentary.) During filming, Forbes formed a close friendship with John and Taupin, which led to other collaborations with them, including photography on the Don't Shoot Me I'm Only the Piano Player and Goodbye Yellow Brick Road album sleeves. ITV broadcast the documentary in the UK on 4 December 1973, and it was later briefly issued on VHS. It was shown in the U.S. on ABC.

Forbes returned to Hollywood to direct The Stepford Wives (1975), based on Ira Levin's novel of the same name. The thriller about the backlash against the Women's Liberation Movement in the U.S., in which Newman had a supporting role, was to become Forbes's best-known film, partly because of the protests against it. Forbes clashed with screenwriter William Goldman over casting decisions and changes to the film's ending made by Forbes, causing Goldman to drop out of the project (while retaining the screenplay credit). Despite its notoriety, The Stepford Wives received mixed reviews and performed weakly at the box office. His subsequent films as a director were less successful: The Slipper and the Rose (1976), with David Frost as executive producer; International Velvet (1978), intended as a continuation of National Velvet (1944), with Newman in the same role as Elizabeth Taylor in the earlier film; Better Late than Never (1983); and The Naked Face (1984). His final writing credit, as one of several screenwriters, was for the biopic Chaplin in 1992.

He served as president of the National Youth Theatre, Writers' Guild of Great Britain and the Beatrix Potter Society.

For a time Forbes owned a bookshop in Virginia Water, Surrey.

== Author ==
Forbes wrote two volumes of autobiography and several successful novels, the last of which, The Soldier's Story, was published in 2012. He was a regular contributor to The Spectator magazine.

== Honours ==
In 2004, Forbes was made a Commander of the Order of the British Empire for his services to the arts. In 2006, he received the Dilys Powell Award for outstanding contribution to cinema of the London Film Critics' Circle Awards. In May 2007, he was the recipient of a BAFTA tribute, celebrating his 'outstanding achievement in filmmaking'.

== Personal life ==
In 1951 he married Irish actress Constance Smith, and the couple travelled to Hollywood in the early 1950s. Forbes soon returned to the UK; he and Smith divorced in 1955. Forbes went on to marry actress Nanette Newman the same year. It was popularly believed that Roger Moore was their best man, but Newman denied this on the Alan Titchmarsh Show in 2011. The couple had two daughters: journalist Sarah Standing, who is married to actor John Standing; and television presenter Emma Forbes.

Forbes was diagnosed with multiple sclerosis in 1975, while working on The Slipper and the Rose; he remained in remission, which he attributed to cutting out gluten and taking vitamins and oil of primrose, together with Newman's care. However, he revealed in a 2012 interview that it had been a misdiagnosis. He continued his acting, directing and screenwriting career into the early 1990s, and was still publishing novels in the 2010s.

He lived in Virginia Water, Surrey where he ran a bookshop in the 1960s. The shop never made a profit, but he thought "it was 'right' to have a bookshop in his local village".

=== Death ===
Forbes died at his home in Virginia Water on 8 May 2013 at the age of 86, following a long illness. His wife survives him.

Journalist and former Spectator editor Matthew d'Ancona, a friend of the Forbes family, said: "Bryan Forbes was a titan of cinema, known and loved by people around the world in the film and theatre industries, and known in other fields, including politics. He is simply irreplaceable and it is wholly apt that he died surrounded by his family." Film critic Mark Kermode wrote: "Once had the fan-boyish pleasure of telling Bryan Forbes how much I loved [The] Stepford Wives. He was charming and self-effacing. A great loss."

== Filmography ==
=== As filmmaker ===
Year	Title	Functioned as			Notes
Year	Title	Director	Writer	Producer	Notes
1960	The Angry Silence	No	Yes	Yes	
1961	Whistle Down the Wind	Yes	No	No	
1962	The L-Shaped Room	Yes	Yes	No	
1964	Séance on a Wet Afternoon	Yes	Yes	Uncredited	
1964	Of Human Bondage	Uncredited	Yes	No	Replaced after four days by Ken Hughes
1965	King Rat	Yes	Yes	No	
1966	The Wrong Box	Yes	No	Yes	
1967	The Whisperers	Yes	Yes	No	
1968	Deadfall	Yes	Yes	No	
1969	The Madwoman of Chaillot	Yes	No	No	
1970	The Man Who Haunted Himself	No	Yes	Uncredited	
1970	Eyewitness	No	Uncredited	Uncredited	
1971	The Raging Moon	Yes	Yes	No	
1975	The Stepford Wives	Yes	Uncredited	No	
1976	The Slipper and the Rose	Yes	Yes	No	
1978	International Velvet	Yes	Yes	Yes	
1980	Sunday Lovers	Yes	No	No	Segment: "An Englishman's Home"
1983	Better Late Than Never	Yes	Yes	No	
1984	The Naked Face	Yes	Yes	No	
1989	The Endless Game	Yes	Yes	No	Television miniseries; based on his novel

==== Writer only ====
Year	Title	Director	Notes
1954	The Black Knight	Tay Garnett	
1955	The Cockleshell Heroes	José Ferrer	
1958	I Was Monty's Double	John Guillermin	
1960	The League of Gentlemen	Basil Dearden	
1960	Man in the Moon	Basil Dearden	
1962	Only Two Can Play	Sidney Gilliat	
1963	Station Six-Sahara	Seth Holt	
1980	Hopscotch	Ronald Neame	
1992	Chaplin	Richard Attenborough	

=== Acting roles ===
Year	Title	Role	Notes
1949	The Small Back Room	Peterson	
1949	All Over the Town	Trumble	
1949	Dear Mr. Prohack	Tony	
1950	The Wooden Horse	Paul	
1951	Green Grow the Rushes	Fred Starling	
1952	Flesh and Fury	Fighter	Uncredited
1952	The World in His Arms	William Cleggett	
1953	Appointment in London	The Brat	
1953	Sea Devils	Willie	
1953	Wheel of Fate	Ted Reid	
1954	The Million Pound Note	Todd	
1954	An Inspector Calls	Eric	
1954	Up to His Neck	Subby	
1955	The Colditz Story	Jimmy Winslow	
1955	Passage Home	Shorty	
1956	Now and Forever	Frisby	
1956	The Black Tent	Dying soldier	Scenes deleted
1956	The Baby and the Battleship	Prof. Evans	
1956	Satellite in the Sky	Jimmy	
1956	It's Great to Be Young	Mr. Parkes, organ salesman	
1956	The Extra Day	Harry	
1957	Quatermass 2	Marsh	
1958	The Key	Weaver	
1958	I Was Monty's Double	Young lieutenant	Cameo
1959	Yesterday's Enemy	Dawson	
1960	The Angry Silence	Journalist	Uncredited cameo
1960	The League of Gentlemen	Martin Porthill	
1961	The Guns of Navarone	Cohn	
1964	Of Human Bondage	Uncredited role	Cameo
1964	A Shot in the Dark	Camp attendant	Credited as 'Turk Thrust'
1965	King Rat	Radio (voice)	Uncredited cameo
1976	The Slipper and the Rose	Herald	Uncredited cameo
1978	International Velvet	Awards presenter	Uncredited cameo
1984	December Flower	Harry Grey	Uncredited cameo
1985	Restless Natives	Driver	Cameo

=== Films produced as head of EMI Films ===
- And Soon the Darkness (1970)
- The Breaking of Bumbo (1970)
- Hoffman (1970)
- Eyewitness (1970)
- The Man Who Haunted Himself (1970)
- Spring and Port Wine (1970)
- The Railway Children (1970)
- A Fine and Private Place (1970) (abandoned)
- The Go-Between (1971)
- Mr. Forbush and the Penguins (1971)
- The Tales of Beatrix Potter (1971)
- The Raging Moon (1971)
- Dulcima (1971)

== Stage credits ==
Year	Title	Venue	Notes
1980	Macbeth	The Old Vic, London	For Old Vic Company
1980	Macbeth	UK tour	For Old Vic Company
1982	Star Quality	Theatre Royal, Bath	
1986–87	Killing Jessica	Savoy Theatre, London	
1986–87	Killing Jessica	Richmond Theatre, London	
1987	The Living Room	Royalty Theatre, London	

=== Acting roles ===
Year	Title	Role	Venue	Notes
1944–45	Flare Path		Bristol Hippodrome, Bristol	
1948–49	September Tide	Jimmy Martyn	Aldwych Theatre, London	
1950–51	The Holly and the Ivy	Mick	UK tour	
1953	Tobias and the Angel	Tobias	Arts Theatre, London	
1953	Four-in-Hand	Gordon	UK tour	
1956–57	The Touch of Fear	Michael Stanham	Aldwych Theatre, London	
1958	Three Way Switch	Cornelius Drake	Theatre Royal, Windsor	
1958	Three Way Switch	Cornelius Drake	Aldwych Theatre, London	
1969	A Talent to Amuse		Phoenix Theatre, London	
1982	Star Quality	Ray Malcolm	Theatre Royal, Bath	

== Select writings ==
=== Novels ===
- Truth Lies Sleeping and other stories (1950)
- The Distant Laughter (1972)
- Slipper and the Rose (1976)
- International Velvet (1978)
- Familiar Strangers (1979), published as Stranger in the USA in 1980
- The Rewrite Man (1983)
- The Endless Game (1986)
- A Song At Twilight (1989)
- The Twisted Playground (1993)
- Partly Cloudy (1995)
- Quicksand (1996)
- The Memory of All That (1999)
- The Choice (2007)
- The Soldier's Story (2012)

=== Non fiction ===
- Notes for a Life (1974)
- Ned's Girl: The Life of Edith Evans (1977)
- That Despicable Race: A History of the British Acting Tradition (1980)
- A Divided Life (1992)

== Awards and nominations ==
Institution	Year	Category	Work	Result	Ref.
Academy Awards	1961	Best Original Screenplay	The Angry Silence	Nominated	
Berlin International Film Festival	1967	Golden Lion	The Whisperers	Nominated	
Berlin International Film Festival	1967	Honourable Mention	The Whisperers	Won	
Berlin International Film Festival	1967	OCIC Award	The Whisperers	Won	
British Academy Film Awards	1961	Best British Screenplay	The League of Gentlemen	Nominated	
British Academy Film Awards	1961	Best British Screenplay	The Angry Silence	Won	
British Academy Film Awards	1962	Best Film	Whistle Down the Wind	Nominated	
British Academy Film Awards	1962	Outstanding British Film	Whistle Down the Wind	Nominated	
British Academy Film Awards	1963	Best British Screenplay	Only Two Can Play	Nominated	
British Academy Film Awards	1965	Best British Screenplay	Séance on a Wet Afternoon	Nominated	
British Academy Film Awards	1966	United Nations Award	King Rat	Nominated	
British Academy Film Awards	2007	Special Award	—N/a	Won	
Edgar Awards	1965	Best Foreign Film	Séance on a Wet Afternoon	Won	
Edgar Awards	1981	Best Motion Picture Screenplay	Hopscotch	Nominated	
London Film Critics' Circle	2006	Dilys Powell Award	—N/a	Won	
Mar del Plata International Film Festival	1962	Best Film	Whistle Down the Wind	Nominated	
San Sebastián International Film Festival	1960	Best Actor (Note: Shared with Richard Attenborough, Jack Hawkins, Roger Livesey and Nigel Patrick)	The League of Gentlemen	Won	
Writers Guild of America	1981	Best Comedy Adapted from Another Medium	Hopscotch	Nominated	
Writers Guild of Great Britain	1963	Best British Comedy Screenplay	Only Two Can Play	Won	
Writers Guild of Great Britain	1965	Best British Dramatic Screenplay	Séance on a Wet Afternoon	Won	
