= I Am a Dancer =

- Directed by: Pierre Jourdan
- Written by: Pierre Jourdan
- Starring: Rudolph Nureyev; Margot Fonteyn
- Production company: EMI Films
- Release date: 1972
- Countries: United Kingdom; France
- Language: English

I Am a Dancer is a 1972 ballet documentary film.
