= Sylvania Waters (TV series) =

- Genre: Reality
- Country of origin: Australia
- Original language: English
- No. of series: 1
- No. of episodes: 12

Production
- Producer: Paul Watson
- Running time: 43-44 minutes

Original release
- Network: Australian Broadcasting Corporation; BBC One
- Release: 21 July – 6 October 1992

Sylvania Waters is an Australian reality television series that followed the lives of an Australian family from the suburb of the same name within Sydney Sutherland Shire. The show's main characters were Noeline Baker and Laurie Donaher, who lived at 48 Macintyre Crescent. They are followed over a six-month period, emphasising their newfound wealth and luxurious lifestyle as well as interpersonal conflicts. The show was an early example of an Australian reality series. It premiered on Australian television in 1992 and was co-produced by the Australian Broadcasting Corporation (ABC) and the British Broadcasting Corporation (BBC). The show was one of the inspirations for the sitcom Kath and Kim.

== Cast ==
- Noeline Baker, mother of Paul, Joanne and Michael
- Laurie Donaher, Noeline's partner of 13 years, father of Mick and Stephen
- Paul Baker, Noeline's eldest son from a previous relationship, who doesn't get along with Laurie
- Dione Baker, Paul's pregnant girlfriend, who gives birth to his son, Kane and who he later marries
- Michael Baker, Noeline's youngest son from a previous relationship, the show's narrator
- Mick Donaher, Laurie's son from a previous relationship, racing enthusiast
- Yvette Donaher, Mick's wife, mother of Kristy and Lisa
- Alan and Pat, Noeline and Laurie's neighbours and drinking buddies
- Annette Galetta, Noeline's sister (misidentified in promotional material as Pat)

== Episodes ==
| No. | Title | Original release date |
|---|---|---|
| 1 | "Episode 1" "It’s More Drama Living in this House than Living Out of It (Note: Although episodes originally aired without titles, they were given them by Anna Lawrenson in a gallery retrospective in 2009, based on quotes from each episode.)" | 21 July 1992 |
Michael introduces us to his family, his mother Noeline and her long time partner Laurie, who live in a million dollar waterfront mansion in the Sydney suburb of Sylvania Waters. The couple started out with nothing, and after building a successful business, now spend their weekends on their boat Blasé, drinking with friends. In contrast, Michael's brother Paul lives in a rented dilapidated house, with his heavily pregnant girlfriend Dione. At the end of the episode, Noelene and Laurie announces their plans to get married in Monaco with their neighbours Pat and Alan by their side.
| 2 | "Episode 2" "Let Bygones Be Bygones" | 28 July 1992 |
It’s Christmas, Michael is in the UK on a school football trip, and Paul's uneasy relationship with Laurie threatens to ruin the family festivities. However, they manage to patch things up. On Boxing Day, Noeline and Laurie watch the Sydney to Hobart yacht race with Mick, Yvette and their kids, and spend New Years Eve at Sydney Harbour.
| 3 | "Episode 3" "They’ve Got to Learn to Save" | 4 August 1992 |
Noeline finally visits Paul and Dione at their home, and is horrified by their living conditions. Laurie and Mick consider becoming joint owners of an expensive racecar, however his doctor has major concerns about his health and wants him to change his lifestyle. While he is overseas, Michael's school report arrives, and Noeline confronts him for his poor results when he finally returns home. At the end of the episode, Dione checks into hospital to be induced.
| 4 | "Episode 4" "Oh My God – Hello Beautiful" | 11 August 1992 |
Fresh from the hairdresser, Noeline arrives at the hospital with a bottle of Dom Pérignon as Dione gives birth to Paul's son, Kane. The family later comes together for Mick and Yvette's daughter Lisa's third birthday. Noeline unleashes on Michael for refusing to wash his hair, and continues to berate him for his bad school report. Laurie and Mick go ahead and buy the racecar.
| 5 | "Episode 5" "Laurie? Mate, He’s Overweight, a Drunk, Disorderly, Stresses Out..." | 18 August 1992 |
As Laurie prepares for his physical to drive the racecar, Noeline forces him on a diet while he cuts down on his alcohol intake. Laurie fails the test initially, but goes to a different doctor and manages to pass the test with the help of a sedative. Mick finally races the new car on their racetrack, but a mechanical problem forces him out of the race, devastating the family.
| 6 | "Episode 6" "Oh Laurie I’d Love to Show You a Photo, He was the Most Magnificent Thing I’ve Ever Seen" | 25 August 1992 |
Noeline hosts a party for the girls with a muscular black male stripper as the entertainment, provoking mixed reactions from the men of the family. Dione discusses her sex life post pregnancy with her sister. Noeline and Laurie look into becoming foster parents through welfare agency Barnardos, however the rest of the family are sceptical.
| 7 | "Episode 7" "For God’s Sake Laurie, He Can Have a Bloody Party" | 1 September 1992 |
Laurie and Michael fight over Michael’s birthday party plans. Eventually, the party is cancelled, and the family gather for a smaller celebration at the house instead. Paul and Dione plan their wedding.
| 8 | "Episode 8" "I Haven’t Got Enough Money to Buy a Friggin’ Tube of Toothpaste, Let Alone Go Out and Get Pissed" | 8 September 1992 |
Dione pressures Paul to get his buck's party organised, but he is more concerned with his financial situation. The family watch the Gay and Lesbian Mardi Gras Parade on television and give their opinions. Noeline and Laurie have second thoughts about becoming foster parents, and enlist neighbour Alan to help deal with Michael's rebellious behaviour.
| 9 | "Episode 9" "Sometimes I Think I’d Be Better Off in a Mental Asylum" | 15 September 1992 |
Noeline is stressed because of the tensions between Laurie and her children, and gets into the habit of drinking eight bourbon and cokes a night. She begins to consider if she has a drinking problem.
| 10 | "Episode 10" "I’d Leave, I Couldn’t Handle Him, if I Was You, I Couldn’t Live with Him" | 22 September 1992 |
Noeline stops drinking bourbon on weekdays, and decides to give up smoking, which provokes more fights with Laurie, who is skeptical of her sobriety. Paul spends his buck's nights with his mates at home, while Dione stays all night in Kings Cross until 5am on her hen's night with the girls.
| 11 | "Episode 11" "She’s Just the Best Chick I’ve Met" | 29 September 1992 |
Paul and Dione get married, while Noeline has second thoughts about eloping in Europe with Laurie.
| 12 | "Episode 12" "I Think She Loves Everything About Me" | 6 October 1992 |
Laurie and Noeline spend the day at the races. On Mother's Day, Noeline and Laurie host a farewell gathering, where Noeline breaks into tears after newlyweds Paul and Dione arrive and start bickering. Noeline and Laurie fly off to Europe, and are considering selling up and moving north to Queensland when they get back from their trip to escape the drama.
