= Albert Herbert =

British artist (1925–2008)

Albert Herbert (10 September 1925, Bow in London – 10 May 2008) was a British abstract and religious artist, painter and etcher.

== Education ==
He went to West Ham secondary school and then worked in the News Chronicle picture library, taking evening classes at Saint Martin's School of Art.

== War service ==
He was called up during the Second World War in 1943, became an infantryman and took part in the Normandy landings in 1944 where he witnessed his comrades being picked off by German snipers in the Normandy bocage. His regiment had lost three-quarters of its men to death and injury by 1945 when it crossed the Rhine. An old schoolfriend, Bryan Forbes, then a member of the "Stars in Battledress" forces entertainment troupe, picked him as a stage designer. This was the start of his artistic career. He was demobbed in 1947. In 1984 Thames Television made a film, Albert Herbert's War, about his wartime experiences.

== Postwar career ==
He won a grant to Wimbledon School of Art and won a scholarship in 1949 to the Royal College of Art. A travel grant took him to Spain and Paris.

He then won a scholarship to the British School in Rome. He had no religious background, but while he was there was drawn towards Catholicism.

In 1954 he began part-time work at Leicester College of Art and in 1956 he became a lecturer at the Birmingham School of Art. He converted to Roman Catholicism at that time although he remained fascinated by Buddhism. This was reflected in his art by his gradual adoption of religious and mythical subjects.

In 1957 two of his oils were included as one of the 'Young Artists of Promise' in Jack Beddington's book.

He joined the staff at Saint Martin's in 1964 and stayed for 21 years, becoming a principal lecturer.

== Personal life ==
At the Royal College of Art he met a sculpture student, Jacqueline Henly, and they married in 1951. They had three daughters; Clare, Madeline, and Lucy.
