= Hoffman (film) =

1970 British film by Alvin Rakoff

- Film Poster
- Directed by: Alvin Rakoff
- Written by: Ernest Gébler
- Based on: the novel Shall I Eat You Now? by Ernest Gebler from Gebler's TV play Call Me Daddy
- Produced by: Ben Arbeid
- Starring: Peter Sellers; Sinéad Cusack; Ruth Dunning; Jeremy Bulloch
- Cinematography: Gerry Turpin
- Edited by: Barrie Vince
- Music by: Ron Grainer
- Production companies: Associated British Picture Corporation (ABPC); Longstone Film Productions
- Distributed by: Anglo-EMI (UK)
- Release date: July 5, 1970
- Running time: 113 minutes
- Country: United Kingdom
- Language: English
- Budget: under £500,000

Hoffman is a 1970 British drama film directed by Alvin Rakoff and starring Peter Sellers, Sinéad Cusack, Ruth Dunning and Jeremy Bulloch. An older man blackmails an attractive young woman into spending a week with him in his flat in London, hoping that she will forget her crooked fiancé and fall in love with him instead.

The film features one of Sellers' rare non-comedic performances.

== Plot ==
Telling her fiancé Tom that she must spend a week with her sick grandmother, Janet instead goes to the flat of Hoffman, a recently divorced executive whom she hardly knows from the firm where she works. Her visit is not voluntary; Hoffman claims to have evidence that could send Tom to jail and has blackmailed her into spending the week with him. Although he desires Janet, Hoffman is still bitter about women and, without pressuring her physically, bullies her psychologically. Young and inexperienced, she eventually begins to fight back and even initiates some sexual provocation, insulting Hoffman when he does not respond.

Hoffman and Janet are interrupted when Tom comes looking for his missing fiancée after receiving an anonymous phone call from Hoffman, and Janet leaves with Tom. Discussing the situation, Tom and his mother ask Janet to return to Hoffman and to continue treating him well in order to keep Tom out of jail. Dismayed that Tom and his mother are more concerned for themselves than for her, Janet returns to Hoffman and negotiates the terms of his invitation to become his permanent companion.

== Cast ==
- Peter Sellers as Benjamin Hoffman
- Sinéad Cusack as Janet Smith
- Jeremy Bulloch as Tom Mitchell
- Ruth Dunning as Mrs. Mitchell
- David Lodge as foreman
- John Tatham as man in restaurant

== Call Me Daddy ==
In 1967 a televised play titled Call Me Daddy, starring Donald Pleasence and Judy Cornwell, was broadcast as part of the Armchair Theatre series. It was written by Ernest Gébler and directed by Alvin Rakoff. The play, which was Gébler's version of Beauty and the Beast, was well-received and won an international Emmy, for the best entertainment programme in the international division.

Gébler turned the story into a stage play, then the 1969 novel Shall I Eat You Now?.

== Production ==
=== Development ===
Producer Ben Arbeid optioned the screen rights to the novel and hired Gébler to write the script for a fee of £21,000. Peter Sellers agreed to star in the film and Columbia were going to back it. However, Columbia pulled out, so the project was taken to Bryan Forbes, who had just been appointed head of production at Associated British Picture Corporation (EMI had taken over Associated British and installed Forbes).

According to Forbes, Sellers did not wish to work with director Alvin Rakoff. However, Forbes insisted that Rakoff remain, and Sellers eventually agreed to work with him. Rakoff later said: "Then we got on like a house on fire." Forbes claimed Sellers made the film for him "as a favour", with a fee of only £85,000. Forbes said this nonetheless made Sellers the most highly paid actor during Forbes' time at MGM. He said British Lion Films helped pay some of the costs.

According to Judy Cornwell, who had been in the television play, Peter Sellers wanted to star opposite an unknown actress rather than Cornwell, whom he considered too well known. Arbeid was worried he wouldn't be able to find someone of sufficient standard and asked Cornwell to "stand by" as back up casting, but Cornwell refused. She felt Sellers was the "wrong sort of actor" to play Hoffman.

The female lead went to Sinéad Cusack (another candidate for the role had been Jane Asher).

In August 1969, production of the film was announced by Bryan Forbes, with Sinéad Cusack and Peter Sellers, for Associated British Picture Corporation. It was one of the first films greenlit by Forbes and was the third film of the Forbes' regime to start filming, following And Soon the Darkness and The Man Who Haunted Himself. Forbes called Hoffman "the first British financed film that Peter Sellers has appeared in in recent memory."

=== Filming ===
The film was shot from 8 September to 24 November 1969, including seven weeks at Elstree Studios and a week on location at Thames Embankment and Wimbledon Common. Gébler was excluded from the film set after being critical of the producer and director.

Director Alvin Rakoff claimed that Sellers had originally wanted to play the role comically, with an Austrian accent. Rakoff persuaded him to play it straight, but says that Sellers then "went the other way – his Hoffman is dark and slow. I kept trying to get Peter to do it faster but he wouldn't. He argued for this brooding quality."

Sellers reportedly despised Hoffman because the lead character was so similar to his own personality. Arbeid said: "Benjamin Hoffman is very lonely, very insecure, very self-deprecating; and these were all terms used by people to describe the real Sellers. So there was much of the character already in the actor... He had to play the internal self that wasn't there to begin with. He couldn't rely on mimicry, and he went through the torture of not knowing who Hoffman was because he didn't know who he was."

According to Sellers' biographer, making the movie "proved agony for Peter. There was too much of himself in it. He played the role without makeup, either physical or vocal."

Rakoff claimed that Sellers and Cusack began a short, intense love affair during filming.

== Release ==
According to Bryan Forbes, "Unfortunately Peter entered into one of his manic depressive periods during the making of the film and immediately [after] it was completed demanded to buy back the negative and remake it. This being hardly feasible, he then gave an interview prior to the film's release in which he stated that the film was a disaster, thus doing everybody, including himself, a disservice. Not surprisingly, the film did not prosper. There was never any rational explanation why Peter acted in the way he did. His performance and that of his co-star, Sinead Cusack, were fine and Alvin's direction polished. It was an outcome I could not have anticipated but for which I had to take the blame." Another account says Sellers asked, through his agent, to purchase the camera negative and remake the film.

Producer Ben Arbeid said: "He [Sellers] had ample opportunity to discuss the film with me before it was delivered to them as a finished piece. Sellers just wanted to eliminate it." The producer later added, Sellers "was so good, so convincing, he tried to buy the prints and burn them. Not because he was ashamed of the film, but because he'd recognised aspects of the inner man he thought he'd hidden forever."

The film experienced trouble with censors but was ultimately assigned an AA rating.

Hoffman was released in July 1970 but was not a success at the box office. Arbeid added that the film received poor distribution, in part because of a conflict between Bryan Forbes and Bernard Delfont, head of EMI. Arbeid commented that the film "was an unusual piece, not what you'd expect of a Peter Sellers performance." Bernard Delfont called And Soon the Darkness, Hoffman and The Man Who Haunted Himself "the real dodos belly-flopping out of Elstree."

Sinéad Cusack later said in 1972 that the film "just didn't work. It was originally a television play stretched out to make a film. Peter was unhappy and I was too young and the film died in the suburbs."

The film was not screened in New York until 1982.

=== Home media ===
The film was released on Blu-ray disc by Powerhouse Films in January 2022.

=== Critical reception ===
Nigel Andrews wrote in The Monthly Film Bulletin: "A modern version of the fairy story "Beauty and the Beast" says the blurb. And determination to bring hero and heroine together for a traditional finale results in several rather limp getting-to-know-each-other sequences, such as the early morning walk on the common, the cosy piano lessons, the wistful visit to Hoffman's half-decorated new house. Momentum is further lost when the dreary plot contrivance of Tom's felony comes to the forefront, and the film pays the price for its gloriously improbable opening situation with a tangle of laboured explication. Unfair though not to repeat that there is some fun on the way; and that Peter Sellers and Sinead Cusack together make an appealingly incongruous pair of lovers."

Variety called it "a disappointment... a minor effort showing distinct signs of its roots, which was as a television play. Sellers’ name may help to sell it to the public but it looks to be an uphill job."

The Cambridge Evening News praised the "immaculate performances".

The Birmingham Evening Mail felt "Sellers has not done anything as good as this for many a day."

The Guardian called it "plodding, indeterminate and desperately mundane."

The Sunday Mirror called the screen play "excrutiating" and said Sellers "is either miscast or way off beam with his interpretation."

The Lancashire Telegraph called it "a strange little curate's egg of a film - a witty, well acted little story marred by a totally unbelievable central character and very peculiar red herrings in the plot."

The Daily Telegraph thought Sellers' character "could hardly be more unpleasant, though we are, it seems, supposed to feel sympathy for him... the piece is saved from disaster only by the directness and good judgment of Sinead Cusack."

Sight and Sound wrote " Some brightish nervous dialogue is spread pretty thinly over this stretched version of a more claustrophobic TV play."

Mike Sutton of the BFI believes that the film "contains one of Sellers’ most interesting performances."

Stephen Vagg of Filmink called the movie "comedy, I guess. Black comedy? Comedy drama? Hard to specify. One can't blame Forbes for green lighting a Peter Sellers vehicle… but this was a weird one. It's a creepy, rapey story in the vibe of something like The Collector about a middle aged man who kidnaps a younger woman… and she comes to fall for him… Sellers is excellent, so is Sinead Cusack, but it's hard to make this sort of material anything other than unpleasant and surely even at inception, Forbes must have known this was a risk."
