= And Soon the Darkness (2010 film) =

- Theatrical release poster
- Directed by: Marcos Efron
- Written by: Marcos Efron; Jennifer Derwingson
- Based on: And Soon the Darkness; 1970 film by Robert Fuest
- Produced by: Chris Clark; Lizzie Friedman; Karen Lauder; Deborah Marcus
- Starring: Amber Heard; Karl Urban; Odette Annable
- Cinematography: Gabriel Beristain
- Edited by: Todd E. Miller
- Music by: tomandandy
- Production companies: Abandon Pictures; RedRum Films; Sandbar Pictures; StudioCanal; Utópica Cine; Canal+ RTBF; CinéCinéma
- Distributed by: Anchor Bay Entertainment
- Release date: December 17, 2010
- Running time: 91 minutes
- Countries: United States; Argentina; France
- Language: English

And Soon the Darkness, also known as Prisioneras de la oscuridad, is a 2010 mystery horror film directed by Marcos Efron and starring Karl Urban, Amber Heard and Odette Annable. It is a remake of the British film And Soon the Darkness (1970). The screenplay was written by Jennifer Derwingson and Marcos Efron.

== Plot ==
Two young American women, Stephanie and Ellie, are backpacking through South America. On their last day in Argentina, they decide to stay in a small hotel. After a drunken night at the local bar, where they encounter some of the local men, the two miss the bus that was supposed to take them to their next destination. Since the bus only comes once per day, they decide to head down to the nearby river to relax and enjoy their extra day off.

The trip takes a turn for the worse when the two are separated after a heated argument, and Ellie is kidnapped. While Stephanie desperately searches for her friend, she is joined by Michael, an American who claims to be looking for his girlfriend who disappeared months before.

The duo is assisted by the town's only police officer who acts oddly suspicious. Stephanie finds the hide-out where the kidnapper has taken Ellie and manages to rescue her. But Ellie is later killed in the escape by the man who kidnapped her.

The policeman appears and lures Stephanie into his car. By finding her passport there, she understands that the lone police officer is actually a sadistic and deranged human trafficker and is the culprit behind all the missing girls. Michael grabs the policeman's weapon. The policeman offers to trade Michael's girlfriend, Camila, for Stephanie. Michael agrees but is shot by the policeman using a second weapon.

Stephanie is taken by the policeman and the kidnapper to be sold. This time she escapes herself by jumping off a boat while killing the kidnapper. Reaching the shore of Paraguay, she is caught by the buyer waiting for her and the Argentinean policeman who chased her, but she manages to escape again. The policeman chases her again, killing a local fisherman who tried to help her on the way. She then hides inside the boat and grabs a knife from the table. When the chaser enters the boat, they fight. She eventually stabs him in the leg to grab his gun and kill the policeman. The last scene shows Stephanie walking to the nearest town at dawn when a jeep arrives and a Paraguayan military woman comes out to finally rescue her.

== Cast ==
- Amber Heard as Stephanie
- Karl Urban as Michael
- Odette Annable as Ellie
- Gia Mantegna as Camila
- Adriana Barraza as Rosamaria
- Michel Noher as Chucho
- Luis Sabatini as Luca
- César Vianco as Calvo
- Maria Salome Cari as Cleaning Woman
- Matias Paz Conde as Skinny Guy
- Andrea Verdun as Waitress
- Nicolas Dolensky as Cute Guy
- Hugo Miranda as Man
- Walter Pena as Mechanic
- Javier Luna as Bar Owner
- Esteban Pastrana as Barman
- Daniel Figuereido as Pedro
- Jorge Booth as Hernán

== Production ==
The film was shot in March 2009 in Argentina.

== Release ==
The film was released on February 18, 2010, as part of the European film market in Germany, and scheduled for a theatrical release on February 11, 2011, over Optimum Releasing in the United Kingdom. On May 14, 2010, Anchor Bay acquired the rights for US distribution of the film, giving it a limited theatrical run starting December 17, 2010.

=== Home media ===
The film was released on DVD and Blu-ray Disc on December 28, 2010.

== Reception ==
On IMDb the film has an approval rating of 5.1/10 based on ratings from ninety-six user reviews.

On JustWatch the film has an approval rating of 44%.

On Rotten Tomatoes the film has an approval rating of 17% based on reviews from six critics.
