= A Fine and Private Place (film) =

- Directed by: Paul Watson
- Written by: Paul Watson
- Based on: stories by A.E. Coppard
- Produced by: W.A. Whittaker
- Starring: Edward Woodward; Nanette Newman
- Production company: EMI Films
- Release date: 1971 (intended)
- Country: United Kingdom
- Language: English
- Budget: £300,000

A Fine and Private Place is a proposed feature film from Paul Watson that was abandoned during filming, ostensibly due to poor weather. Watson called it "an absolute disaster".

== Premise ==
A love story set in the 1920s between a loner schoolmaster, Jones, and the married, privileged Judith Leeward.

== Cast ==
- Edward Woodward
- Nanette Newman
- Roger Lyle

== Production ==
=== Development ===
Paul Watson was a documentary filmmaker who had written the script. His agent sent a copy to Bryan Forbes, head of EMI Films, who greenlit the film and announced it as part of his slate in August 1969. Forbes said it was "a very good script" and that Watson "came to me with a very good pedigree at the BBC". It was one of several films Forbes financed from inexperienced directors (some of these worked out well, others badly). Forbes later wrote in his memoirs he felt Watson's "enthusiasm and approach merited the risk; the screenplay contained all the ingredients for a compelling film and I gave him the go-ahead."

According to Forbes, the fee of Nanette Newman, who was Forbes' wife, was £5,000, while Woodward "who was very hot at the time" was paid £10,000. Newman had just completed The Raging Moon written and directed by Forbes.

=== Shooting ===
Production began in Tintagel, Cornwall on 15 April 1970. The plan was to film for nine days at Lanhydrock House, and also at Assize Hall, with filming to be completed at Elstree Studios. Watson claimed he quit before the first day of the shoot but was persuaded to return.

Watson later said he had "a good script and a wonderful cameraman... but everyone else were complete bitches." He claimed Nanette Newman never learned how to ride a horse despite having months to do so, and that Bryan Forbes rewrote the script. He also said his producer was more of a production manager - "this was his pension... Bryan thought it was a good idea to put the young with the old but it was a disaster, we didn't speak the same language at all."

=== Cancellation ===
The film soon fell behind schedule, forcing Forbes to visit the set. Forbes later claimed that after two weeks of filming a third of the budget had been spent for only ten minutes of screen time. Forbes also felt the footage would not cut together and was unimpressed with how Watson planned to film other scenes, including a sequence involving butterflies and a sex scene between Newman and Woodward. Forbes says when he raised his concerns with Watson he was not reassured, so Forbes shut down the production and fired the director. (Another account says the film was shut after 21 days of filming.)

Forbes paid off the cast and crew. He said "EMI went crazy." The movie was budgeted at £280,000 and Forbes estimated it would have eventually cost £400,000 (£118,000 had been spent). "I shut the gate before it was too late," he said. (Another account says the budget was £300,000.)

Watson said Forbes shut down the film in part because of the financial failure of early EMI films such as The Man Who Haunted Himself. "The Old Pals Act was not serving the British film industry," said Watson. "Bryan was a lovely man but he could never say no. And he liked his friends. I think he was a good director but a rotten manager."

The delay was blamed at the time on the weather in Cornwall. An EMI spokesman said "location work was stopped because it was going beyond its budget. If sites closer to Elstree cannot be found work on the film could be abandoned."

Forbes later called it "the most agonising decision I ever had to take on a film. I felt sorry for everybody concerned and I knew that I would come in for heavy criticism. But everything is relative and this was my Heaven’s Gate. I did not have the luxury of increasing the budget and, even if I had, I had lost confidence in the ability of the director to deliver. It was a tragedy of good intentions, a blight on Nanette’s and Edward’s careers and a sad loss of income for the crew."

== Legacy ==
Over the next two weeks Forbes attempted to resuscitate the project with director John Hough but he eventually decided not to proceed and the film was abandoned. Filming ceased for good in mid-May 1970.

Forbes publicly blamed the cancellation on bad weather, which he said would make the film £70,000-£80,000 over budget, saying "this is too much to get back in the English market it was made for. One film today, just one, which runs into budget trouble and has to have endless money poured into it can bring a studio to its knees". Forbes added another factor was Woodward had to start rehearsals for a play at the National [Theatre] on 30 June, saying the film "was built around its star Edward Woodward to take advantage of his popularity as Callan on TV and his prestige at the National Theatre."

Watson stayed in Yorkshire for a year and wrote another screenplay but it was never made. He returned to documentaries ("I came back a very chastened figure") and subsequently had a highly successful career in that field.
