= List of American films of 1970 =

More than 290 American films were released in 1970.

== Box office ==
The highest-grossing American films released in 1970, by domestic box office gross revenue as estimated by The Numbers, are as follows:

Highest-grossing films of 1970
Rank	Title	Distributor	Domestic gross
1	Love Story	Paramount	$106,397,186
2	Airport	Universal	$100,489,150
3	M*A*S*H	20th Century Fox	$81,600,000
4	Patton	20th Century Fox	$62,500,000
5	The Aristocats	Walt Disney	$41,162,795
6	Woodstock	Warner Bros.	$34,505,110
7	Little Big Man	National General Pictures	$31,559,552
8	Ryan's Daughter	MGM	$30,846,306
9	Tora! Tora! Tora!	20th Century Fox	$29,548,291
10	Catch-22	Paramount	$24,911,670

== January–March ==
Opening		Title	Production company	Cast and crew	Ref.
J A N U A R Y	1	Scream and Scream Again	American International Pictures / Amicus Productions	Gordon Hessler (director); Christopher Wicking (screenplay); Vincent Price, Christopher Lee, Peter Cushing, Alfred Marks, Judy Huxtable, Michael Gothard, Anthony Newlands, Kenneth Benda, Uta Levka, Yutte Stensgaard, Julian Holloway, Peter Sallis, Clifford Earl, Nigel Lambert, Amen Corner, David Lodge, Gertan Klauber, Christopher Matthews, Marshall Jones, Judi Bloom, Edgar D. Davies, Rosalind Elliot, Olga Linden, Joe Wadham	
J A N U A R Y	2	Jenny	Cinerama Releasing Corporation / ABC Pictures / Palomar Pictures	George Bloomfield (director/screenplay); Martin Lavut (screenplay); Marlo Thomas, Alan Alda, Marian Hailey, Phil Bruns, Charlotte Rae, Vincent Gardenia, Elizabeth Wilson, Stephen Strimpell, Fred Willard, Michael Mislove	
J A N U A R Y	6	The Adventures of Gerard	United Artists	Jerzy Skolimowski (director/screenplay); Arthur Conan Doyle, H.A.L. Craig, Gene Gutowski, Charles Wood (screenplay); Peter McEnery, Claudia Cardinale, Eli Wallach, Jack Hawkins, Mark Burns, Norman Rossington, John Neville, Paolo Stoppa, Ivan Desny, Leopoldo Trieste, Solvi Stubing	
J A N U A R Y	9	...tick...tick...tick...	Metro-Goldwyn-Mayer	Ralph Nelson (director); James Lee Barrett (screenplay); Jim Brown, George Kennedy, Fredric March, Lynn Carlin, Don Stroud, Janet MacLachlan, Richard Elkins, Clifton James, Bob Random, Mills Watson, Bernie Casey, Anthony James, Dub Taylor, Ernest Anderson, Karl Swenson	
J A N U A R Y	14	Last of the Mobile Hot Shots	Warner Bros.-Seven Arts	Sidney Lumet (director); Gore Vidal (screenplay); James Coburn, Lynn Redgrave, Robert Hooks, Perry Hayes, Reggie King	
J A N U A R Y	14	The Dunwich Horror	American International Pictures / Alta Vista Productions	Daniel Haller (director); Curtis Hanson, Henry Rosenbaum, Ronald Silkosky (screenplay); Sandra Dee, Dean Stockwell, Ed Begley, Lloyd Bochner, Sam Jaffe, Talia Shire, Michael Fox, Jason Wingreen, Barboura Morris, Beach Dickerson, Donna Baccala, Joanna Moore Jordan, Jack Pierce	
J A N U A R Y	21	The Only Game in Town	20th Century Fox	George Stevens (director); Frank D. Gilroy (screenplay); Elizabeth Taylor, Warren Beatty, Hank Henry, Charles Braswell	
J A N U A R Y	21	Rider on the Rain (France)	Avco-Embassy	René Clément (director); Sébastien Japrisot (screenplay); Charles Bronson, Marlène Jobert, Gabriele Tinti, Annie Cordy, Corinne Marchand, Jill Ireland, Jean Piat, Jean Gaven, Marika Green, Marcel Pérès, Ellen Bahl, Marc Mazza	
J A N U A R Y	25	M*A*S*H	20th Century Fox / Aspen Productions / Ingo Preminger Productions	Robert Altman (director); Ring Lardner Jr. (screenplay); Donald Sutherland, Elliott Gould, Tom Skerritt, Sally Kellerman, Robert Duvall, Roger Bowen, René Auberjonois, David Arkin, Jo Ann Pflug, John Schuck, Carl Gottlieb, Danny Goldman, Corey Fischer, Indus Arthur, Dawne Damon, Tamara Horrocks, Gary Burghoff, Ken Prymus, Fred Williamson, Michael Murphy, Timothy Brown, Bud Cort, G. Wood, Kim Atwood, Dale Ishimoto, Bobby Troup, Marvin Miller, Ben Davidson	
J A N U A R Y	28	The Molly Maguires	Paramount Pictures	Martin Ritt (director); Walter Bernstein (screenplay); Sean Connery, Richard Harris, Samantha Eggar, Frank Finlay, Anthony Zerbe, Bethel Leslie, Art Lund, Philip Bourneuf, John Alderson, Frances Heflin, Malachy McCourt, Anthony Costello, Brendan Dillon	
F E B R U A R Y	1	The Kremlin Letter	20th Century Fox	John Huston (director/screenplay); Gladys Hill (screenplay); Bibi Andersson, Richard Boone, Nigel Green, Dean Jagger, Patrick O'Neal, George Sanders, Max von Sydow, Orson Welles, Barbara Parkins, Micheál MacLíammóir, Ronald Radd, Lila Kedrova, Raf Vallone, Sandor Elès, Vonetta McGee, Anthony Chinn, Niall MacGinnis, Cyril Shaps, John Huston	
F E B R U A R Y	4	The Honeymoon Killers	American International Pictures / Cinerama Releasing Corporation	Leonard Kastle (director/screenplay); Shirley Stoler, Tony Lo Bianco, Marilyn Chris, Doris Roberts, Barbara Cason, Mary Jane Higby, Elsa Raven, Dortha Duckworth, Kip McArdle, Mary Breen, Ann Harris, Mary Engel, Guy Sorel	
F E B R U A R Y	4	Start the Revolution Without Me	Warner Bros.-Seven Arts / Norbud Productions	Bud Yorkin (director); Lawrence J. Cohen, Fred Freeman (screenplay); Gene Wilder, Donald Sutherland, Hugh Griffith, Jack MacGowran, Billie Whitelaw, Victor Spinetti, Ewa Aulin, Helen Fraser, Rosalind Knight, Harry Fowler, Murray Melvin, Ken Parry, Maxwell Shaw, Jacques Maury, Graham Stark, Barry Lowe, George A. Cooper, Michael Rothwell, Denise Coffey, Orson Welles, Walker Edmiston	
F E B R U A R Y	5	Patton	20th Century Fox	Franklin J. Schaffner (director); Francis Ford Coppola, Edmund H. North (screenplay); George C. Scott, Karl Malden, David Bauer, Edward Binns, John Doucette, Michael Strong, Peter Barkworth, Lawrence Dobkin, Paul Stevens, Morgan Paull, Stephen Young	
F E B R U A R Y	9	Zabriskie Point	Metro-Goldwyn-Mayer	Michelangelo Antonioni (director/screenplay); Fred Gardner, Sam Shepard, Tonino Guerra, Clare Peploe (screenplay); Mark Frechette, Daria Halprin, Rod Taylor, Paul Fix, G. D. Spradlin, Bill Garaway, Kathleen Cleaver, The Open Theater, Austin Willis, Harrison Ford	
F E B R U A R Y	10	End of the Road	Allied Artists / Max L. Raab Productions	Aram Avakian (director/screenplay); Terry Southern, Dennis McGuire (screenplay); James Earl Jones, Stacy Keach, Dorothy Tristan, Harris Yulin, Grayson Hall, Ray Brock, John Pleshette, James Coco	
F E B R U A R Y	10	The Party at Kitty and Stud's	Cinema Epoch / Italian Stallion Productions	Morton Lewis (director/screenplay); Sylvester Stallone, Henrietta Holm, Jodi Van Prang, Nicholas Warren, Frank Micelli, Barbara Storm, Janet Banzet	
F E B R U A R Y	11	King of the Grizzlies	Walt Disney Productions / Buena Vista Distribution / Robert Lawrence Productions	Ron Kelly (director); Jack Speirs, Rod Peterson, Norman Wright (screenplay); John Yesno, Chris Wiggins, Hugh Webster, Jack Van Evera, Big Ted, Winston Hibler	
F E B R U A R Y	12	Mumsy, Nanny, Sonny and Girly	Cinerama Releasing Corporation	Freddie Francis (director); Brian Comport (screenplay); Michael Bryant, Ursula Howells, Vanessa Howard, Howard Trevor, Pat Heywood, Hugh Armstrong, Imogen Hassall	
F E B R U A R Y	19	The Bird with the Crystal Plumage (Italy)	Seda Spettacoli S.p.A. / CCC Filmkunst GmbH	Dario Argento (director/screenplay); Tony Musante, Suzy Kendall, Enrico Maria Salerno, Eva Renzi, Umberto Raho, Mario Adorf, Gildo Di Marco, Fulvio Mingozzi, Werner Peters, Carla Mancini, Reggie Nalder, Renato Romano, Giuseppe Castellano, Pino Patti, Rosita Torosh, Omar Bonaro, Karen Valenti	
F E B R U A R Y	25	Hercules in New York	RAF Industries	Arthur Allan Seidelman (director); Aubrey Wisberg (screenplay); Arnold Stang, Arnold Schwarzenegger, Deborah Loomis, James Karen, Ernest Graves, Tanny McDonald, Taina Elg, Michael Lipton, Harold Burstein, George Bartenieff, Rudy Bond, Dan Hamilton, Mark Tendler, Dennis Tinerino, Richard Herd, Tony Carroll, Aubrey Wisberg	
F E B R U A R Y	27	Le Boucher (France)	Cinerama Releasing Corporation	Claude Chabrol (director/screenplay); Stéphane Audran, Jean Yanne, Roger Rudel	
M A R C H	4	Loving	Columbia Pictures	Irvin Kershner (director); Don Devlin (screenplay); George Segal, Eva Marie Saint, Sterling Hayden, Keenan Wynn, David Doyle, Paul Sparer, Sherry Lansing, Roland Winters, Edgar Stehli, Diana Douglas, David Ford, John Fink, Ed Crowley, Roy Scheider, Sab Shimono, Betsy von Furstenberg, Nancie Phillips, Janis Young, Andrew Duncan, Calvin Holt, Mina Kolb, James Manis, Mart Hulswit, William Duffy, Irving Selbst, Martin Harvey Friedberg, Lorraine Cullen, Cheryl Bucher, Eileen O'Neill, Diane Davies	
M A R C H	5	Airport	Universal Pictures / Ross Hunter Productions	George Seaton (director/screenplay); Burt Lancaster, Dean Martin, Jean Seberg, Jacqueline Bisset, George Kennedy, Helen Hayes, Van Heflin, Maureen Stapleton, Barry Nelson, Lloyd Nolan, Dana Wynter, Barbara Hale, Gary Collins, Jessie Royce Landis, Larry Gates, Peter Turgeon, Whit Bissell, Virginia Grey, Paul Picerni, Robert Patten, Clark Howat, Lew Brown, Lisa Gerritsen, James Nolan, Dick Winslow, Lou Wagner, Mary Jackson	
M A R C H	6	Skullduggery	Universal Pictures / Saul David Productions	Gordon Douglas (director); Nelson Gidding (screenplay); Burt Reynolds, Susan Clark, Roger C. Carmel, Paul Hubschmid, Chips Rafferty, Alexander Knox, Pat Suzuki, Edward Fox, Wilfrid Hyde-White, William Marshall, Rhys Williams, Michael St. Clair, Booker Bradshaw, James Bacon, Clarence Harris, Newt Arnold, Mike Preece, Saul David, Eddie Fuchs, Mort Marshall, John Kimberley, Gilbert Senior, Burnal "Custus" Smith, John Woodcock, Wendell Baggett, Charles Washburn	
M A R C H	17	The Boys in the Band	National General Pictures / Cinema Center Films	William Friedkin (director); Mart Crowley (screenplay); Kenneth Nelson, Leonard Frey, Cliff Gorman, Laurence Luckinbill, Frederick Combs, Keith Prentice, Robert La Tourneaux, Reuben Greene, Peter White, Maud Adams, Elaine Kaufman	
M A R C H	18	The Ballad of Cable Hogue	Warner Bros.	Sam Peckinpah (director); John Crawford, Edmund Penney (screenplay); Jason Robards, Stella Stevens, David Warner, Strother Martin, Slim Pickens, L. Q. Jones, Peter Whitney, R. G. Armstrong, Gene Evans, William Mims, Kathleen Freeman, Vaughn Taylor, Max Evans, James Anderson, Susan O'Connell, Felix Nelson, Darwin Lamb, Mary Munday, William D. Faralla, Matthew Peckinpah, Easy Pickens	
M A R C H	18	The Liberation of L.B. Jones	Columbia Pictures / Liberation Company	William Wyler (director); Jesse Hill Ford, Stirling Silliphant (screenplay); Roscoe Lee Browne, Lee J. Cobb, Lee Majors, Anthony Zerbe, Lola Falana, Arch Johnson, Barbara Hershey, Yaphet Kotto, Chill Wills, Zara Cully, Fayard Nicholas, Joe Attles, Lauren Jones, Dub Taylor, Brenda Sykes, Larry D. Mann, Ray Teal, Eve McVeagh, Jack Grinnage	
M A R C H	20	Carry On Up the Jungle (United Kingdom)	The Rank Organisation	Gerald Thomas (director); Talbot Rothwell (screenplay); Frankie Howerd, Sid James, Charles Hawtrey, Joan Sims, Terry Scott, Kenneth Connor, Bernard Bresslaw, Jacki Piper, Valerie Leon, Nina Baden-Semper, Roy Stewart, Reuben Martin, Edwina Carroll, Danny Daniels, Yemi Ajibade, Lincoln Webb, Heather Emmanuel, Verna Lucille MacKenzie, Valerie Moore, Cathi March, John Hamilton, Willie Jonah, Chris Konyils	
M A R C H	21	Gamera vs. Jiger (Japan)	Daiei Film	Noriaki Yuasa (director); Niisan Takahashi (screenplay); Tsutomu Takakuwa, Kelly Burris, Katherine Murphy, Kon Ohmura, Junko Yashiro, Sanshiro Honoo, Franz Gruber, Sho Natsuki, Chico Roland	
M A R C H	24	Bloody Mama	American International Pictures	Roger Corman (director); Robert Thom (screenplay); Shelley Winters, Pat Hingle, Don Stroud, Diane Varsi, Bruce Dern, Clint Kimbrough, Robert De Niro, Robert Walden, Alex Nicol, Pamela Dunlap, Michael Fox, Scatman Crothers, Stacy Harris	
M A R C H	24	King: A Filmed Record... Montgomery to Memphis	Martin Luther King Film Project / Commonwealth United Entertainment	Sidney Lumet, Joseph L. Mankiewicz (directors); Harry Belafonte, Ruby Dee, Ben Gazzara, Charlton Heston, James Earl Jones, Burt Lancaster, Paul Newman, Anthony Quinn, Clarence Williams III, Joanne Woodward, Ralph Abernathy, James Baldwin, Tony Bennett, Leonard Bernstein, Marlon Brando, H. Rap Brown, Stokely Carmichael, Diahann Carroll, Wilt Chamberlain	
M A R C H	25	The Adventurers	Paramount Pictures / Embassy Pictures	Lewis Gilbert (director/screenplay); Michael Hastings (screenplay); Charles Aznavour, Alan Badel, Candice Bergen, Thommy Berggren, Delia Boccardo, Ernest Borgnine, Rossano Brazzi, Olivia de Havilland, Bekim Fehmiu, Anna Moffo	
M A R C H	26	Woodstock	Warner Bros.	Michael Wadleigh (director); Janis Joplin, Canned Heat, Joan Baez, Joe Cocker, Country Joe and the Fish, Crosby, Stills & Nash, Arlo Guthrie, Richie Havens, Jimi Hendrix, Santana, John Sebastian, Sha-Na-Na, Sly & The Family Stone, Ten Years After, The Who, Jefferson Airplane	
M A R C H	27	Young Flying Hero (Taiwan)			
M A R C H	31	Waterloo	Paramount Pictures	Sergei Bondarchuk (director/screenplay); H.A.L. Craig, Vittorio Bonicelli, Mario Soldati (screenplay); Rod Steiger, Christopher Plummer, Orson Welles, Jack Hawkins, Virginia McKenna, Dan O'Herlihy, Serghej Zakhariadze, Ian Ogilvy, Philippe Forquet, Gianni Garko, Ivo Garrani	

== April–June ==
Opening		Title	Production company	Cast and crew	Ref.
A P R I L	3	Count Dracula (Italy)	Warner Bros. / Variety Distribution / Filmar Compagnia Cinematografica / Fénix Cooperativa Cinematográfica / Corona Filmproduktion / Towers of London	Jesús Franco (director); Peter Welbeck (screenplay); Christopher Lee, Herbert Lom, Klaus Kinski, Frederick Williams, Maria Rohm, Soledad Miranda, Jack Taylor, Paul Müller, Jesús Puente, Franco Castellani	
A P R I L	4	Gods of the Plague (West Germany)	Basis-Film-Verleih GmbH / Antiteater-X-Film GmbH	Rainer Werner Fassbinder (director/screenplay); Hanna Schygulla, Margarethe von Trotta, Harry Baer, Günther Kaufmann, Ingrid Caven, Yaak Karsunke, Rainer Werner Fassbinder, Kurt Raab, Irm Hermann, Carla Egerer, Marian Seidowsky, Micha Cochina, Thomas Schieder, Peter Moland, Doris Mattes	
A P R I L	8	Colossus: The Forbin Project	Universal Pictures	Joseph Sargent (director); James Bridges (screenplay); Eric Braeden, Susan Clark, Gordon Pinsent, William Schallert, Marion Ross, Georg Stanford Brown, Willard Sage, Martin E. Brooks, Dolph Sweet, Byron Morrow, Paul Frees, James Hong, Leonid Rostoff, Alex Rodine, Sid McCoy	
A P R I L	8	The Cockeyed Cowboys of Calico County	Universal Pictures	Anton Leader (director); Ranald MacDougall (director/screenplay); Dan Blocker, Nanette Fabray, Jack Elam, Jim Backus, Wally Cox, Mickey Rooney, Don "Red" Barry, Hamilton Camp, Noah Beery Jr., Henry Jones, Marge Champion, Jack Cassidy, Stubby Kaye, Byron Foulger, Iron Eyes Cody, Susan Saint James, James McCallion, Ray Ballard, Raven Grey	
A P R I L	9	Halls of Anger	United Artists / The Mirisch Corporation	Paul Bogart (director); John Herman Shaner, Al Ramrus (screenplay); Calvin Lockhart, Janet MacLachlan, Jeff Bridges, DeWayne Jessie, Ed Asner, John McLiam, Rob Reiner, Patricia Stich, Ta-Tanisha, Helen Kleeb, Barry Brown, James A. Watson Jr., Gary Tigerman, Paris Earle	
A P R I L	22	Country Dance	Metro-Goldwyn-Mayer	J. Lee Thompson (director); James Kennaway (screenplay); Peter O'Toole, Susannah York, Michael Craig, Harry Andrews, Cyril Cusack, Judy Cornwell, Brian Blessed, Robert Urquhart, Jean Anderson, Helena Gloag, Mark Malicz, Lennox Milne	
A P R I L	26	Chariots of the Gods (West Germany)	Terra Film	Harald Reinl (director/screenplay); Wilheim Roggersdorf (screenplay); Heinz-Detlev Bock, Klaus Kindler, Christian Marschall	
A P R I L	26	A Swedish Love Story (Sweden)	Europa Film / Coproduction Office	Roy Andersson (director/screenplay); Ann-Sofie Kylin, Rolf Sohlman, Anita Lindblom, Bertil Norström, Björn Andrésen, Lennart Tellfelt, Margreth Weivers, Arne Andersson, Maud Backéus, Verner Edberg, Tommy Nilsson, Gunnar Ossiander, Lennart Tollén	
A P R I L	27	Hi, Mom!	Sigma III / West End Films	Brian De Palma (director/screenplay); Robert De Niro, Charles Durning, Jennifer Salt, Gerrit Graham, Lara Parker, Allen Garfield, Paul Bartel, Bruce D. Price, Ricky Parker, Andy Parker, Floyd L. Peterson, Paul Hirsch	
A P R I L	27	Zig Zag	Metro-Goldwyn-Mayer	Richard A. Colla (director); John T. Kelley (screenplay); George Kennedy, Anne Jackson, Eli Wallach, Steve Ihnat, William Marshall, Joe Maross, Dana Elcar, Walter Brooke, Anita O'Day, Robert Patten	
A P R I L	28	A Man Called Horse	National General Pictures / Cinema Center Films / Sandy Howard Productions	Elliot Silverstein (director); Jack DeWitt (screenplay); Richard Harris, Dame Judith Anderson, Jean Gascon, Manu Tupou, Corinna Tsopei, Dub Taylor, James Gammon, William Jordan, Eddie Little Sky, Lina Marín, Manuel Padilla Jr., Iron Eyes Cody, Tamara Garina, Sonny Skyhawk	
A P R I L	29	The Confession (France) / (Italy)	Paramount Pictures	Costa-Gavras (director); Jorge Semprún, Artur London (screenplay); Yves Montand, Simone Signoret, Michel Vitold, Gabriele Ferzetti, Jean Bouise, Gérard Darrieu, Gilles Segal, Henri Marteau, Michel Beaune	
M A Y	4	The Grasshopper	National General Pictures	Jerry Paris (director); Jerry Belson, Garry Marshall (screenplay); Jacqueline Bisset, Jim Brown, Joseph Cotten, Corbett Monica, Christopher Stone, Ramon Bieri, Ed Flanders, William Callaway, Roger Garrett, William Bassett, Marc Hannibal, Penny Marshall	
M A Y	6	Equinox	Tonylyn Productions	Jack Woods (director/screenplay); Edward Connell, Barbara Hewitt, Frank Boers Jr., Robin Christopher, Jack Woods, Fritz Leiber, Jim Phillips, Patrick Burke, Jim Duron, Norvelle Brooks, Irving L. Lichtenstein, Jim Danforth, Forrest J. Ackerman, Sharon Gray, Louis Clayton	
M A Y	7	Taste the Blood of Dracula	Warner Bros. / Hammer Films	Peter Sasdy (director); John Elder (screenplay); Christopher Lee, Linda Hayden, Geoffrey Keen, Gwen Watford, Anthony Corlan, Ralph Bates, Peter Sallis, John Carson, Isla Blair, Martin Jarvis, Roy Kinnear, Michael Ripper, Russell Hunter, Shirley Jaffe, Keith Marsh, Madeline Smith, Peter May, Reginald Barratt	
M A Y	11	Leo the Last	United Artists	John Boorman (director/screenplay); Bill Stair, George Tabori (screenplay); Marcello Mastroianni, Billie Whitelaw, Keefe West, Calvin Lockhart, Glenna Forster-Jones, Graham Crowden, Gwen Ffrangcon Davies, Vladek Sheybal, Kenneth Warren, David de Keyser, Brinsley Forde	
M A Y	11	Tell Me That You Love Me, Junie Moon	Paramount Pictures / Sigma Productions	Otto Preminger (director); Marjorie Kellogg (screenplay); Liza Minnelli, Ken Howard, Robert Moore, James Coco, Kay Thompson, Fred Williamson, Pete Seeger, Ben Piazza, Leonard Frey, Anne Revere, Julie Bovasso, Clarice Taylor, Angelique Pettyjohn, Wayne Tippit, Nancy Marchand, Ric O'Feldman, Lynn Milgrim, Pacific Gas & Electric	
M A Y	13	Connecting Rooms (United Kingdom)	Paramount Pictures / Hemdale	Franklin Gollings (director/screenplay); Bette Davis, Michael Redgrave, Alexis Kanner, Kay Walsh, Leo Genn, Olga Georges-Picot, Richard Wyler, Mark Jones, Gabrielle Drake, Brian Wilde, John Woodnutt	
M A Y	13	Getting Straight	Columbia Pictures	Richard Rush (director); Robert Kaufman (screenplay); Elliott Gould, Candice Bergen, Jeff Corey, Max Julien, Cecil Kellaway, Jon Lormer, Leonard Stone, William Bramley, Jeannie Berlin, John Rubinstein, Richard Anders, Brenda Sykes, Jenny Sullivan, Gregory Sierra, Billie Bird, Harrison Ford, Robert F. Lyons, Elizabeth Lane, Hilary Thompson, Irene Tedrow	
M A Y	13	Let It Be	United Artists / Apple Films / ABKCO Industries	Michael Lindsay-Hogg (director); The Beatles	
M A Y	13	My Lover, My Son	Metro-Goldwyn-Mayer	John Newland (director); Jenni Hall, William Marchant, Wilbur Stark (screenplay); Romy Schneider, Dennis Waterman, Donald Houston, Patricia Brake, Peter Sallis, William Dexter, Alexandra Bastedo, Janet Brown, Peter Gilmore	
M A Y	15	The Delta Factor	Continental Distributing / Medallion Television / Spillane-Fellows Productions Inc.	Tay Garnett (director/screenplay); Raoul Walsh (screenplay); Yvette Mimieux, Christopher George, Diane McBain, Ralph Taeger, Yvonne De Carlo	
M A Y	20	Borsalino (France)	Paramount Pictures / Adel Productions / Marianne Productions / Mars Film Produzione	Jacques Deray (director/screenplay); Jean-Claude Carrière, Jean Cau, Claude Sautet (screenplay); Jean-Paul Belmondo, Alain Delon, Arnoldo Foà, Catherine Rouvel, Françoise Christophe, Corinne Marchand, Laura Adani, Nicole Calfan, Hélène Rémy, Mario David, Dennis Berry, Odette Piquet, Lionel Vitrant, Jean Aron, André Bollet, Pierre Koulak	
M A Y	20	The Landlord	United Artists / Mirisch Company / Cartier Productions	Hal Ashby (director); Bill Gunn (screenplay); Beau Bridges, Lee Grant, Diana Sands, Pearl Bailey, Walter Brooke, Lou Gossett, Marki Bey, Melvin Stewart, Susan Anspach, Robert Klein, Will Mackenzie, Charlie Murphy	
M A Y	20	One More Time	United Artists	Jerry Lewis (director); Michael Pertwee (screenplay); Sammy Davis Jr., Peter Lawford, Maggie Wright, Ester Anderson, John Wood, Dudley Sutton, Percy Herbert, Anthony Nicholls, Allan Cuthbertson, Edward Evans, Leslie Sands, Glyn Owen, Peter Cushing, Christopher Lee, Jerry Lewis	
M A Y	20	Suppose They Gave a War and Nobody Came	Cinerama Releasing Corporation / ABC Pictures	Hy Averback (director); Hal Captain, Don McGuire (screenplay); Brian Keith, Ernest Borgnine, Suzanne Pleshette, Tony Curtis, Ivan Dixon, Tom Ewell, Bradford Dillman, Arthur O'Connell, Maxine Stuart, Pamela Britton, Don Ameche, Robert Emhardt, Christopher Mitchum, Grady Sutton	
M A Y	20	Too Late the Hero	Cinerama Releasing Corporation / ABC Pictures / Associates & Aldrich Company / Palomar Pictures International	Robert Aldrich (director/screenplay); Lukas Heller (screenplay); Michael Caine, Cliff Robertson, Ian Bannen, Harry Andrews, Ronald Fraser, Denholm Elliott, Lance Percival, Percy Herbert, Patrick Jordan, Sam Kydd, William Beckley, Harvey Jason, Don Knight, Roger Newman, Henry Fonda, Ken Takakura, Martin Horsey, Michael J. Parson, Sean MacDuff, Frank Webb	
M A Y	21	Norwood	Paramount Pictures	Jack Haley Jr. (director); Marguerite Roberts (screenplay); Glen Campbell, Kim Darby, Joe Namath, Carol Lynley, Pat Hingle, Tisha Sterling, Dom DeLuise, Jack Haley, Cass Daley, Leigh French, Meredith MacRae, Sammy Jackson, Billy Curtis, Edith Atwater, Jimmy Boyd, Virginia Capers, Merie Earle, David Huddleston, Gil Lamb	
M A Y	26	Beneath the Planet of the Apes	20th Century Fox / APJAC Productions	Ted Post (director); Paul Dehn (screenplay); James Franciscus, Kim Hunter, Maurice Evans, Linda Harrison, Paul Richards, Victor Buono, James Gregory, Jeff Corey, Natalie Trundy, Thomas Gomez, Don Pedro Colley, David Watson, Tod Andrews, Gregory Sierra, Charlton Heston, Paul Frees, Lou Wagner, Army Archerd	
M A Y	26	Cotton Comes to Harlem	United Artists / Formosa Productions	Ossie Davis (director/screenplay); Arnold Perl (screenplay); Godfrey Cambridge, Raymond St. Jacques, Calvin Lockhart, Judy Pace, Redd Foxx, Emily Yancy, John Anderson, Lou Jacobi, Eugene Roche, J. D. Cannon, Helen Martin, Cleavon Little, Theodore Wilson, Leonardo Cimino, Frederick O'Neal, Don Bexley, Mabel Robinson, Dick Sabol	
M A Y	26	The Magic Garden of Stanley Sweetheart	Metro-Goldwyn-Mayer	Leonard Horn (director); Robert T. Westbrook (screenplay); Don Johnson, Dianne Hull, Michael Greer, Holly Near, Karen Lynn Gorney, Brandon Maggart, Linda Gillin, Victoria Racimo	
M A Y	26	Pufnstuf	Universal Pictures / Sid and Marty Krofft Enterprises	Hollingsworth Morse (director); John Fenton Murray, Si Rose (screenplay); Jack Wild, Billie Hayes, Martha Raye, Cass Elliot, Billy Barty, Jane Dulo, Jan Davis, Sharon Baird, Angelo Rossitto, Felix Silla, Johnny Silver, Van Snowden, Lou Wagner, Walker Edmiston, Joan Gerber, Al Melvin, Don Messick, Allison McKay, Princess Livingston, Joy Campbell, Roberto Gamonet, Andy Ratoucheff, Hommy Stewart, Pat Lytell, Buddy Douglas, Jon Linton, Bob Howland, Scutter McKay	
M A Y	27	The Out-of-Towners	Paramount Pictures / Jalem Productions	Arthur Hiller (director); Neil Simon (screenplay); Jack Lemmon, Sandy Dennis, Sandy Baron, Anne Meara, Robert Nichols, Ann Prentiss, Ron Carey, Philip Bruns, Graham Jarvis, Carlos Montalbán, Pepe Hern, Johnny Brown, Dolph Sweet, Jack Crowder, Jon Korkes, Robert Walden, Richard Libertini, Paul Dooley, Anthony Holland, Billy Dee Williams, A.P. Westcott, Robert King, Bob Bennett	
M A Y	27	Watermelon Man	Columbia Pictures	Melvin Van Peebles (director); Herman Raucher (screenplay); Godfrey Cambridge, Estelle Parsons, Howard Caine, D'Urville Martin, Mantan Moreland, Kay E. Kuter, Erin Moran, Emil Sitka, Karl Lukas, Paul H. Williams, Melvin Van Peebles, Kay Kimberley, Scott Garrett, Irving Selbst	
M A Y	28	Two Mules for Sister Sara	Universal Pictures / The Malpaso Company / Sanen Productions	Don Siegel (director); Albert Maltz (screenplay); Clint Eastwood, Shirley MacLaine, Manolo Fábregas, Armando Silvestre, Enrique Lucero, David Estuardo, Ada Carrasco, Pancho Córdova, José Ángel Espinosa, Rosa Furman, Alberto Morin, John Kelly, José Chávez	
J U N E	3	The Executioner	Columbia Pictures / Ameran Films	Sam Wanamaker (director); Jack Pulman (screenplay); George Peppard, Joan Collins, Judy Geeson, Oskar Homolka, Charles Gray, Nigel Patrick, Keith Michell, George Baker, Alexander Scourby, Peter Bull, Ernest Clark, Peter Dyneley, Gizela Dali, Lewis Alexander, Peter Evans, Stefan Gryff, Steve Plytas	
J U N E	4	Julius Caesar	American International Pictures / Commonwealth United	Stuart Burge (director); Robert Furnival (screenplay); Charlton Heston, Jason Robards, John Gielgud, Richard Johnson, Robert Vaughn, Richard Chamberlain, Diana Rigg, Christopher Lee, Jill Bennett, André Morell, Derek Godfrey, Michael Gough, David Neal, Preston Lockwood	
J U N E	4	The Vampire Doll (Japan)	Toho	Michio Yamamoto (director); Ei Ogawa, Hiroshi Nagano (screenplay); Kayo Matsuo, Yukiko Kobayashi, Atsuo Nakamura, Akira Nakao, Sachio Sakai, Kaku Takashina, Yoko Minazake, Jun Usami	
J U N E	10	Crimes of the Future	New Cinema Enterprises	David Cronenberg (director/screenplay); Ronald Mlodzik, Jon Lidolt, Tania Zolty, Jack Messinger, Paul Mulholland, William Haslam, William Poolman, Iain Ewing, Brian Linehan, Ray Woodley	
J U N E	10	The Invincible Six	Continental Distributing / Moulin Rouge Productions	Jean Negulesco (director); Guy Elmes, Chester Erskine (screenplay); Stuart Whitman, Elke Sommer, Curd Jürgens, James Mitchum, Ian Ogilvy, Behrouz Vossoughi, Lon Satton, Isarco Ravaioli, Pouri Banayi	
J U N E	10	Sleeping Beauty (re-issue)	Walt Disney Productions / Buena Vista Distribution	Clyde Geronimi, Wolfgang Reitherman, Eric Larson, Les Clark (directors); Erdman Penner, Joe Rinaldi, Winston Hibler, Bill Peet, Ted Sears, Ralph Wright, Milt Banta (screenplay); Mary Costa, Bill Shirley, Eleanor Audley, Verna Felton, Barbara Luddy, Barbara Jo Allen, Taylor Holmes, Bill Thompson, Bobby Amsberry, Candy Candido, Pinto Colvig, Hans Conried, Dallas McKennon, Marvin Miller, Helene Stanley, Ed Kemmer, Frances Bavier, Madge Blake, Spring Byington, Don Barclay, June Fowler	
J U N E	12	The Cheyenne Social Club	National General Pictures / Cinema Center Films	Gene Kelly (director); James Lee Barrett (screenplay); James Stewart, Henry Fonda, Shirley Jones, Sue Ane Langdon, Elaine Devry, Jason Wingreen, Jackie Joseph, Robert Middleton, Robert J. Wilke, Dabbs Greer, Charles Tyner, Arch Johnson, Jean Willes, Carl Reindel, J. Pat O'Malley, Hal Baylor, Charlotte Stewart, Myron Healey, Red Morgan, Richard Alexander, Frank Baker, Noble "Kid" Chissell, John Dehner, Max Wagner, Dan White, Richard Collier, Jackie Russell, Sharon DeBord, Warren Kemmerling, Dick Johnstone	
J U N E	15	The Strawberry Statement	Metro-Goldwyn-Mayer	Stuart Hagmann (director); Israel Horovitz (screenplay); Bruce Davison, Kim Darby, Bud Cort, Andrew Parks, Kristina Holland, Bob Balaban, Greta Pope, Danny Goldman, Booker Bradshaw, James Coco, James Simon Kunen, Kristin Van Buren, Murray MacLeod	
J U N E	17	Beyond the Valley of the Dolls	20th Century Fox	Russ Meyer (director); Roger Ebert (screenplay); Dolly Read, Cynthia Myers, Marcia McBroom, Phyllis Davis, Erica Gavin, John LaZar, Michael Blodgett, David Gurian, Edy Williams, Harrison Page, Duncan McLeod, James Iglehart, Charles Napier, Henry Rowland, Marshall Kent, The Strawberry Alarm Clock, Pam Grier, Trina Parks, Coleman Francis, Russ Meyer, Dan White	
J U N E	17	The Hawaiians	United Artists / The Mirisch Company	Tom Gries (director); James R. Webb (screenplay); Charlton Heston, Tina Chen, Geraldine Chaplin, John Phillip Law, Alec McCowen, Mako, Miko Mayama, Naomi Stevens, Harry Townes, Khigh Dhiegh, Keye Luke, James Gregory, Lyle Bettger, Mark Le Buse, Harry Holcombe, Daniel Kaleikini Jr., James Hong, Don Knight Milton, Virginia Lee, Mary Munday, Matthew Fitzgerald, Bruce Wilson, Mailie Mccauley, Alan Naluai, Forrest Wood, Murray Staff, Galen Kam, Victor Sen Yung, Soo Young, Elizabeth Smith, Tanya Chang, George Paulsin, Jules Martin, Winston Char, Michael Leong, Randy Kim, Victor Young, Bill Fong, Chris Robinson	
J U N E	17	On a Clear Day You Can See Forever	Paramount Pictures	Vincente Minnelli (director); Alan Jay Lerner (screenplay); Barbra Streisand, Yves Montand, Bob Newhart, Larry Blyden, Simon Oakland, Jack Nicholson, John Richardson, Mabel Albertson, Roy Kinnear, Pamela Brown, Irene Handl, Laurie Main, Kermit Murdock, Elaine Giftos, John Le Mesurier, Leon Ames, George Neise, Jeannie Berlin, Richard Kiel, Howard W. Koch, Judith Lowry, Paula Trueman	
J U N E	17	A Walk in the Spring Rain	Columbia Pictures	Guy Green (director); Stirling Silliphant (screenplay); Anthony Quinn, Ingrid Bergman, Fritz Weaver, Katherine Crawford, Tom Fielding, Virginia Gregg, Mitchell Silberman	
J U N E	19	A Bullet for Pretty Boy	American International Pictures	Larry Buchanan (director); Henry Rosenbaum (screenplay); Fabian Forte, Jocelyn Lane, Adam Roarke, Astrid Warner, Michael Haynes, Robert Glenn, Anne McAdams, Jeff Alexander, Camilla Carr	
J U N E	21	Catch-22	Paramount Pictures / Filmways	Mike Nichols (director); Buck Henry (screenplay); Alan Arkin, Martin Balsam, Richard Benjamin, Art Garfunkel, Jack Gilford, Buck Henry, Bob Newhart, Anthony Perkins, Paula Prentiss, Martin Sheen, Jon Voight, Orson Welles, Bob Balaban, Susanne Benton, Norman Fell, Charles Grodin, Austin Pendleton, Peter Bonerz, Jon Korkes, John Brent, Collin Wilcox-Horne, Phil Roth, Bruce Kirby, Jack Riley, Felice Orlandi, Marcel Dalio, Evi Maltagliati, Elizabeth Wilson, Richard Libertini, Liam Dunn, Olimpia Carlisi	
J U N E	23	Kelly's Heroes	Metro-Goldwyn-Mayer / Katzka-Loeb Productions / Avala Film / The Warriors Company	Brian G. Hutton (director); Troy Kennedy Martin (screenplay); Clint Eastwood, Telly Savalas, Don Rickles, Carroll O'Connor, Donald Sutherland, Gavin MacLeod, Stuart Margolin, Jeff Morris, Richard Davalos, Perry Lopez, Tom Troupe, Dean Stanton, Len Lesser, David Hurst, Dee Pollock, George Savalas, Karl-Otto Alberty, Ross Elliott, Sandy Kevin, Paul Picerni, Rayford Barnes, John Landis, Joe Mantell, Yves Montand, Hal Buckley, Dick Balduzzi, Gene Collins, Fred Pearlman, Michael Clark, George Fargo, John Heller, Shepherd Sanders	
J U N E	24	Myra Breckinridge	20th Century Fox	Michael Sarne (director/screenplay); David Giler (screenplay); Raquel Welch, Rex Reed, John Huston, Mae West, Farrah Fawcett, Roger C. Carmel, George Furth, Calvin Lockhart, Jim Backus, John Carradine, Andy Devine, Grady Sutton, Kathleen Freeman, B. S. Pully, Buck Kartalian, Monte Landis, Tom Selleck, Toni Basil, Dan Hedaya, William Hopper, Roger Herren, Robert Lieb, Skip Ward	
J U N E	24	Darling Lili	Paramount Pictures / Geoffrey Productions	Blake Edwards (director/screenplay); William Peter Blatty (screenplay); Julie Andrews, Rock Hudson, Jeremy Kemp, Lance Percival, Michael Witney, Jacques Marin, André Maranne, Gloria Paul, Bernard Kay, Doreen Keogh, Carl Duering, Vernon Dobtcheff, Laurie Main, Arthur Gould-Porter, Ingo Mogendorf, Yves Barsacq, Patrick Bricard, Albert Carrier, Jean Del Val, George DeNormand, Bernard La Jarrige, James Lanphier, Niall MacGinnis, Rolfe Sedan	

== July–September ==
Opening		Title	Production company	Cast and crew	Ref.
J U L Y	1	The Boatniks	Walt Disney Productions / Buena Vista Distribution	Norman Tokar (director); Arthur Julian (screenplay); Robert Morse, Stefanie Powers, Phil Silvers, Norman Fell, Mickey Shaughnessy, Wally Cox, Don Ameche, Joey Forman, Vito Scotti, Tom Lowell, Bob Hastings, Sammy Jackson, Joe E. Ross, Judith Jordan, Al Lewis, Midori, Kelly Thordsen, Gil Lamb	
J U L Y	1	Lost Flight	Universal Pictures / NBC	Leonard J. Horn (director); Dean Riesner (screenplay); Lloyd Bridges, Bobby Van, Anne Francis, Ralph Meeker, Andrew Prine, Linden Chiles, Michael Larrain, Billy Dee Williams, Michael-James Wixted, Nobu McCarthy, Jennifer Leak, Kasey Rogers, Joseph Bernard, Paul Comi, Dallas Mitchell, William Mims, Edward Faulkner, Georgene Barnes, Dee Carroll, Albert Popwell, Gil Perkins, Connie Kreski	
J U L Y	1	Ned Kelly (United Kingdom / Australia)	United Artists / Woodfall Film Productions	Tony Richardson (director/screenplay); Ian Jones (screenplay); Mick Jagger, Mark McManus, Serge Lazareff, Peter Sumner, Ken Shorter, James Elliott	
J U L Y	2	Goin' Down the Road	Chevron Pictures / Evdon Films	Donald Shebib (director/screenplay); William Fruet (screenplay); Doug McGrath, Paul Bradley, Jayne Eastwood, Cayle Chernin, Nicole Morin, Pierre La Roche	
J U L Y	2	The Moonshine War	Metro-Goldwyn-Mayer / Filmways Pictures	Richard Quine (director); Elmore Leonard (screenplay); Patrick McGoohan, Richard Widmark, Alan Alda, Melodie Johnson, Will Geer, Joe Williams, Suzanne Zenor, Lee Hazlewood, Max Showalter, Harry Carey Jr., Tom Nolan, Richard Peabody, John Schuck, Bo Hopkins, Charles Tyner, Teri Garr, Dick Crockett, Tom Skerritt	
J U L Y	4	And Soon the Darkness (United Kingdom)	Warner-Pathé / Associated British Picture Corporation / EMI Elstree	Robert Fuest (director); Brian Clemens, Terry Nation (screenplay); Pamela Franklin, Michele Dotrice, Sandor Elès, John Nettleton, Clare Kelly, Hana Maria Pravda, John Franklyn, Claude Bertrand, Jean Carmet, André Maranne	
J U L Y	9	The Games	20th Century Fox	Michael Winner (director); Erich Segal (screenplay); Michael Crawford, Ryan O'Neal, Charles Aznavour, Jeremy Kemp, Elaine Taylor, Stanley Baker, Athol Compton, Rafer Johnson, Ron Pickering, Adrian Metcalfe, Kent Smith, Sam Elliott, Mona Washbourne, Reg Lye, June Jago, Don Newsome, Slim de Grey	
J U L Y	9	Which Way to the Front?	Warner Bros.	Jerry Lewis (director); Gerald Gardner, Dee Caruso (screenplay); Jerry Lewis, Jan Murray, Dack Rambo, Steve Franken, John Wood, Willie Davis, Kaye Ballard, Joe Besser, Paul Winchell, Kathleen Freeman, Bobo Lewis, Harold J. Stone, Neil Hamilton, Sidney Miller, George Takei, Robert Middleton, Danny Dayton, Richard Loo, Robert Kino	
J U L Y	12	Hello-Goodbye	20th Century Fox / Darryl F. Zanuck Productions	Jean Negulesco (director); Roger Marshall (screenplay); Michael Crawford, Genevieve Gilles, Curd Jürgens, Ira Fürstenberg, Lon Satton, Peter Myers, Mike Marshall, Didier Haudepin, Vivian Pickles, Agathe Natanson, Georges Bever, Denise Grey, Jeffry Wickham	
J U L Y	13	Quackser Fortune Has a Cousin in the Bronx	UMC Pictures	Waris Hussein (director); Gabriel Walsh (screenplay); Gene Wilder, Margot Kidder, Eileen Colgan, David Kelly, David Davin-Power, Seamus Forde, May Ollis, Liz Davis, Caroline Tully	
J U L Y	15	Joe	Cannon Group	John G. Avildsen (director); Norman Wexler (screenplay); Peter Boyle, Dennis Patrick, Audrey Caire, Susan Sarandon, K Callan, Marlene Warfield, Patrick McDermott	
J U L Y	15	The Revolutionary	United Artists	Paul Williams (director); Hans Koning (screenplay); Jon Voight, Seymour Cassel, Robert Duvall, Jennifer Salt, Collin Wilcox, Alan Tilvern, Lionel Murton, Jeffrey Jones	
J U L Y	16	Cromwell (United Kingdom)	Columbia Pictures / Irving Allen Productions	Ken Hughes (director/screenplay); Richard Harris, Alec Guinness, Robert Morley, Dorothy Tutin, Frank Finlay, Timothy Dalton, Patrick Wymark, Patrick Magee, Nigel Stock	
J U L Y	18	The Man Who Haunted Himself	Warner-Pathé / EMI Films / Associated British Picture Corporation	Basil Dearden (director/screenplay); Michael Relph, Bryan Forbes (screenplay); Roger Moore, Hildegarde Neil, Kevork Malikyan, Thorley Walters, Anton Rodgers, Olga Georges-Picot, Freddie Jones, John Welsh, Edward Chapman, Charles Lloyd-Pack, Gerald Sim, Ruth Trouncer, Aubrey Richards, Anthony Nicholls, John Carson, Basil Henson, Tony Wright, Alastair Mackenzie, Hugh Mackenzie, Laurence Hardy	
J U L Y	22	Something for Everyone	National General Pictures / Cinema Center Films	Harold Prince (director); Hugh Wheeler (screenplay); Angela Lansbury, Michael York, Anthony Higgins, Jane Carr, Heidelinde Weis, Wolfried Lier, Despo Diamantidou, John Gill, Eva Maria Meineke, Klaus Havenstein, Walter Janssen	
J U L Y	29	Chisum	Warner Bros. / Batjac Productions	Andrew V. McLaglen (director); Andrew J. Fenady (screenplay); John Wayne, Forrest Tucker, Christopher George, Ben Johnson, Glenn Corbett, Andrew Prine, Bruce Cabot, Patric Knowles, Richard Jaeckel, Lynda Day, Geoffrey Deuel, Pamela McMyler, John Agar	
J U L Y	31	Move	20th Century Fox / Berman-Century Productions	Stuart Rosenberg (director); Joel Lieber, Stanley Hart (screenplay); Elliott Gould, Paula Prentiss, Genevieve Waite, John Larch, Joe Silver, Graham Jarvis, Ron O'Neal, Garrie Bean, David Burns, Richard Bull, Richard Benedict, Mae Questel, Aly Wassil, John Wheeler, Rudy Bond, Yvonne d'Angers, Amy Thomson, Roger Bowen, Stanley Adams, Jeannie Berlin, Otto Waldis	
A U G U S T	1	The Rebel Rousers	Four Star Excelsior / Paragon International Pictures	Martin B. Cohen (director/screenplay); Michael Kars, Abe Polsky (screenplay); Cameron Mitchell, Bruce Dern, Diane Ladd, Harry Dean Stanton, Jack Nicholson, Neil Nephew, John 'Bud' Cardos	
A U G U S T	1	Space Amoeba (Japan)	Toho	Ishirō Honda (director); Ei Ogawa (screenplay); Akira Kubo, Atsuko Takahashi, Yukiko Kobayashi, Kenji Sahara, Yoshio Tsuchiya, Yu Fujiki, Noritake Saito, Yuko Sugihara, Sachio Sakai, Chotaro Togin, Wataru Omae, Haruo Nakajima, Haruyoshi Nakamura, Ichiro Murakoshi, Tetsu Nakamura	
A U G U S T	3	Ann and Eve (Sweden)	Chevron Pictures / Jadran Film / Omega Film	Arne Mattsson (director); Ernest Hotch (screenplay); Gio Petré, Marie Liljedahl, Francisco Rabal	
A U G U S T	3	Case for a Rookie Hangman (Czechoslovakia)	Ústřendí půjčovna filmů / Filmové studio Barrandov	Pavel Juráček (director/screenplay); Lubomír Kostelka, Klára Jerneková, Milena Zahrynowská, Radovan Lukavský, Jiří Janda, Luděk Kopřiva, Miloš Vávra, Miroslav Macháček	
A U G U S T	3	Performance	Warner Bros. / Goodtimes Enterprises	Donald Cammell (director/screenplay); Nicolas Roeg (director); James Fox, Mick Jagger, Anita Pallenberg, Michèle Breton, Ann Sidney, John Bindon, Stanley Meadows, Allan Cuthbertson, Anthony Morton, Johnny Shannon, Anthony Valentine, Kenneth Colley, John Sterland, Laraine Wickens	
A U G U S T	6	Goodbye Gemini	Cinerama Releasing Corporation	Alan Gibson (director); Edmund Ward (screenplay); Judy Geeson, Michael Redgrave, Martin Potter, Alexis Kanner, Mike Pratt, Marion Diamond, Freddie Jones, Peter Jeffrey, Terry Scully, Daphne Heard, Laurence Hardy, Joseph Fürst, Brian Wilde, Ricky Renée, Barry Scott	
A U G U S T	10	Diary of a Mad Housewife	Universal Pictures / Frank Perry Films Inc.	Frank Perry (director); Eleanor Perry (screenplay); Richard Benjamin, Frank Langella, Carrie Snodgress, Leonard Elliott, Margo, Alice Cooper, Lester Rawlins, Peter Boyle, Lorraine Cullen, Frannie Michel, Lee Addoms, Peter Dohanos, Katherine Meskill, Hilda Haynes	
A U G U S T	12	Lovers and Other Strangers	Cinerama Releasing Corporation / ABC Pictures	Cy Howard (director); Joseph Bologna, David Zelag Goodman, Renée Taylor (screenplay); Bea Arthur, Bonnie Bedelia, Michael Brandon, Richard Castellano, Bob Dishy, Harry Guardino, Marian Hailey, Anne Jackson	
A U G U S T	12	Soldier Blue	Embassy Pictures / Katzka-Loeb	Ralph Nelson (director); John Gay (screenplay); Candice Bergen, Peter Strauss, Donald Pleasence, John Anderson, Jorge Rivero, Dana Elcar, Bob Carraway, Martin West, James Hampton, Mort Mills, Jorge Russek, Ralph Nelson	
A U G U S T	19	WUSA	Paramount Pictures	Stuart Rosenberg (director); Robert Stone (screenplay); Paul Newman, Joanne Woodward, Anthony Perkins, Pat Hingle, Don Gordon, Michael Anderson Jr., Bruce Cabot, Cloris Leachman, Moses Gunn, Laurence Harvey, Leigh French, Wayne Rogers, Robert Quarry, Skip Young, B.J. Mason, Sahdji, Geoffrey Edwards, Hal Baylor, Clifton James, Tol Avery, Paul Hampton, Jerry Catron, Preservation Hall Jazz Band	
A U G U S T	24	House of Dark Shadows	Metro-Goldwyn-Mayer	Dan Curtis (director); Sam Hall, Gordon Russell (screenplay); Jonathan Frid, Grayson Hall, Kathryn Leigh Scott, Roger Davis, Nancy Barrett, John Karlen, Thayer David, Louis Edmonds, Donald Briscoe, David Henesy, Dennis Patrick, Joan Bennett, Lisa Richards, Jerry Lacy, Barbara Cason, Paul Michael, Humbert Allen Astredo, Terry Crawford, Michael Stroka, George DiCenzo	
A U G U S T	26	The Breach (France) / (Italy)	New Line Cinema / Gaumont	Claude Chabrol (director/screenplay); Stéphane Audran, Jean-Pierre Cassel, Michel Bouquet, Michel Duchaussoy, Annie Cordy, Jean-Claude Drouot, Jean Carmet, Catherine Rouvel, Claude Chabrol	
A U G U S T	26	The People Next Door	AVCO Embassy Pictures	David Greene (director); JP Miller (screenplay); Eli Wallach, Julie Harris, Hal Holbrook, Deborah Winters, Stephen McHattie, Cloris Leachman, Don Scardino, Rue McClanahan, Nehemiah Persoff, Mike Kellin	
S E P T E M B E R	1	Deep End (United Kingdom) / (West Germany)	Paramount Pictures	Jerzy Skolimowski (director/screenplay); Jerzy Gruza, Boleslaw Sulik (screenplay); Jane Asher, John Moulder-Brown, Karl Michael Vogler, Chris Sandford, Diana Dors, Erica Beer, Anita Lochner, Cheryl Hall, Dieter Eppler, Eduard Linkers, Burt Kwouk, Jerzy Skolimowski, Louise Martini, Annemarie Kuster, Christina Paul, Karl Ludwig Lindt, Will Danin, Gerald Rowland, Ursula Mellin, Erika Wackernagel, Uli Steigberg, Peter Martin Urtel	
S E P T E M B E R	2	Angel Unchained	American International Pictures	Lee Madden (director); Jeffrey Alan Fiskin (screenplay); Don Stroud, Luke Askew, Larry Bishop, Tyne Daly, Aldo Ray, T. Max Graham	
S E P T E M B E R	3	Fragment of Fear	Columbia Pictures	Richard C. Sarafian (director); Paul Dehn (screenplay); David Hemmings, Gayle Hunnicutt, Wilfrid Hyde-White, Flora Robson, Adolfo Celi, Roland Culver, Daniel Massey, Mona Washbourne, Arthur Lowe, Yootha Joyce, Derek Newark, Patricia Hayes, Mary Wimbush, Glynn Edwards	
S E P T E M B E R	9	Bed and Board (France)	Columbia Pictures	François Truffaut (director/screenplay); Claude de Givray, Bernard Revon (screenplay); Jean-Pierre Léaud, Claude Jade, Daniel Ceccaldi, Claire Duhamel, Hiroko Berghauer, Daniel Boulanger, Barbara Laage, Billy Kearns, Claude Véga, Jacques Jouanneau, Philippe Léotard, Pierre Maguelon, Marie Dedieu, Jacques Cottin, Silvana Blasi, Pierre Fabri, Danièle Girard, Jacques Robiolles, Marie Irakane	
S E P T E M B E R	12	Five Easy Pieces	Columbia Pictures / BBS Productions	Bob Rafelson (director); Adrien Joyce (screenplay); Jack Nicholson, Karen Black, Susan Anspach, Lois Smith, Ralph Waite, Billy "Green" Bush, Irene Dailey, Toni Basil, Helena Kallianiotes, William Challee, John Ryan, Fannie Flagg, Marlena MacGuire, Sally Struthers, Lorna Thayer, Richard Stahl, Clay Greenbush, Bob Rafelson	
S E P T E M B E R	16	R. P. M.	Columbia Pictures	Stanley Kramer (director); Erich Segal (screenplay); Anthony Quinn, Ann-Margret, Gary Lockwood, Paul Winfield, Graham Jarvis, Alan Hewitt, Ramon Bieri, John McLiam, Don Keefer, Norman Burton, John Zaremba, Ines Pedroza, Jose Brad, Henry Brown, Frank Alesia	
S E P T E M B E R	17	The Brotherhood of the Bell	CBS Television / Warner Bros. Television	Paul Wendkos (director); David Karp (screenplay); Glenn Ford, Rosemary Forsyth, Dean Jagger, Maurice Evans, Will Geer, Eduard Franz, William Conrad, Robert Pine, William Smithers, Logan Field, Dabney Coleman, Scott Graham	
S E P T E M B E R	21	Crime and Punishment (U.S.S.R)	Mosfilm / Gorky Film Studio	Lev Kulidzhanov (director/screenplay); Nikolai Figurovsky, Fyodor Dostoyevsky (screenplay); Georgy Taratorkin, Innokenty Smoktunovsky, Tatyana Bedova, Victoria Fyodorova, Yefim Kopelyan, Yevgeni Lebedev, Maya Bulgakova, Irina Gosheva, Vladimir Basov, Aleksandr Pavlov, Vladimir Belokurov, Inna Makarova, Sergei Nikonenko, Valery Nosik, Dzidra Ritenberga, Ivan Ryzhov, Yuri Sarantsev, Lyubov Sokolova, Vladimir Nosik	
S E P T E M B E R	22	Adam at 6 A.M.	National General Pictures / Cinema Center Films / Solar Productions	Robert Scheerer (director); Stephen Karpf, Elinor Karpf (screenplay); Michael Douglas, Lee Purcell, Joe Don Baker, Louise Latham, Charles Aidman, Grayson Hall, Marge Redmond, Dana Elcar, Carolyn Conwell, Timothy Blake, Richard Derr, Del Monroe, Meg Foster, Anne Gwynne, Ed Call, Butch Youngblood, Greg Joseph, Pat Randal, Jo Ella Deffenbaugh, Sharon Marshall, David Sullivan, Ned Wertheimer	
S E P T E M B E R	23	Tora! Tora! Tora!	20th Century Fox / Williams-Fleischer Productions / Toei Company	Richard Fleischer, Toshio Masuda, Kinji Fukasaku (directors); Larry Forrester, Hideo Oguni, Ryūzō Kikushima (screenplay); Martin Balsam, Sō Yamamura, Joseph Cotten, Tatsuya Mihashi, E. G. Marshall, James Whitmore, Takahiro Tamura, Eijirō Tōno, Jason Robards, George Macready, Leon Ames, Meredith Weatherby, Edward Andrews, Bill Zuckert	

== October–December ==
Opening		Title	Production company	Cast and crew	Ref.
O C T O B E R	1	The Baby Maker	National General Pictures / Robert Wise Productions	James Bridges (director/screenplay); Barbara Hershey, Collin Wilcox-Horne, Sam Groom, Scott Glenn, Jeannie Berlin, Lili Valenty, Helena Kallianiotes, Jeff Siggins, Phyllis Coates, Madge Kennedy, Ray Hemphill, Paul Linke, Bobby Pickett, Samuel Francis, Alan Keesling	
O C T O B E R	1	Cover Me Babe	20th Century Fox	Noel Black (director); George Wells (screenplay); Robert Forster, Sondra Locke, Susanne Benton, Ken Kercheval, Sam Waterston, Michael Margotta, Floyd Mutrux, Maggie Thrett, Jeff Corey, Robert Fields, Regis Toomey, Mitzi Hoag, Carmen Argenziano, Mike Kellin	
O C T O B E R	1	How Do I Love Thee?	Cinerama Releasing Corporation / ABC Pictures / Freeman-Enders	Michael Gordon (director); Everett Freeman, Karl Tunberg (screenplay); Jackie Gleason, Maureen O'Hara, Shelley Winters, Rosemary Forsyth, Rick Lenz	
O C T O B E R	1	The Traveling Executioner	Metro-Goldwyn-Mayer	Jack Smight (director); Garrie Bateson (screenplay); Stacy Keach, Marianna Hill, Bud Cort, Graham Jarvis, James Sloyan, M. Emmet Walsh, Ford Rainey, James Greene, Sam Reese, Stefan Gierasch, Logan Ramsey, Charles Tyner, William Mims, Val Avery, Walt Barnes, Charlie Briggs, Katherine MacGregor, Lorna Thayer, John Bottoms, Paul Gauntt, Pat Patterson	
O C T O B E R	4	Trash	Cinema 5 Distributing	Paul Morrissey (director/screenplay); Joe Dallesandro, Holly Woodlawn, Jane Forth, Michael Sklar, Andrea Feldman, Sissy Spacek, Geri Miller, Johnny Putnam, Bruce Pecheur, Diane Podlewski	
O C T O B E R	4	The Vampire Lovers	American International Pictures / Hammer Film Productions / Fantale Films	Roy Ward Baker (director); Tudor Gates (screenplay); Ingrid Pitt, George Cole, Kate O'Mara, Peter Cushing, Dawn Addams, Douglas Wilmer, Pippa Steel, Madeline Smith, Jon Finch, Ferdy Mayne, Kirsten Lindholm, John Forbes-Robertson, Shelagh Wilcocks, Harvey Hall, Janet Key, Charles Farrell	
O C T O B E R	7	Monte Walsh	National General Pictures / Cinema Center Films / Landers-Roberts Productions	William A. Fraker (director); David Zelag Goodman, Lukas Heller (screenplay); Lee Marvin, Jeanne Moreau, Jack Palance, Mitchell Ryan, Jim Davis, G. D. Spradlin, John "Bear" Hudkins, Raymond Guth, John McKee, Michael Conrad, Tom Heaton, Ted Gehring, Bo Hopkins, John McLiam, Allyn Ann McLerie, Matt Clark, Charles Tyner, Jack Colvin, Roy Barcroft	
O C T O B E R	9	The American Soldier (West Germany)	New Yorker Films / Antiteater	Rainer Werner Fassbinder (director/screenplay); Karl Scheydt, Elga Sorbas, Jan George, Hark Bohm, Marius Aicher, Margarethe von Trotta, Ulli Lommel, Katrin Schaake, Ingrid Caven, Eva Ingeborg Scholz, Kurt Raab, Irm Hermann, Gustl Datz, Rainer Werner Fassbinder	
O C T O B E R	11	The Great White Hope	20th Century Fox / Lawrence Turman Films	Martin Ritt (director); Howard Sackler (screenplay); James Earl Jones, Jane Alexander, Lou Gilbert, Joel Fluellen, Chester Morris, Robert Webber, Marlene Warfield, R. G. Armstrong, Hal Holbrook, Beah Richards, Moses Gunn, Lloyd Gough	
O C T O B E R	12	The Mind of Mr. Soames	Columbia Pictures / Amicus Productions	Alan Cooke (director); John Hale, Edward Simpson (screenplay); Terence Stamp, Nigel Davenport, Robert Vaughn, Christian Roberts, Donal Donnelly, Norman Jones, Vickery Turner, Judy Parfitt, Scott Forbes, Dan Jackson, Joe McPartland, Pamela Moiseiwitsch, Billy Cornelius	
O C T O B E R	12	Girls for Mercenaries (Spain)	CEA Distribución	Pascual Cervera (director); Santiago Peláez (screenplay); Antonio Cintado, Mónica Sun de Sander Ramsés, María Elena Flores, Claudia Gravy, Luis Induni, Antonio Jiménez Escribano, Juan Antonio Marín, Luis Marín, Julio Pérez Tabernero, Carlos Quiney, Puri Villa	
O C T O B E R	14	C.C. and Company	AVCO Embassy Pictures / Namanco / Rogallan Productions	Seymour Robbie (director); Roger Smith (screenplay); Joe Namath, Ann-Margret, William Smith, Jennifer Billingsley, Mike Battle, Greg Mullavey, Don Chastain, Sid Haig, Bruce Glover, Ned Wertimer, Wayne Cochran, Teda Bracci, Keva Kelly, Jackie Rohr, Robert Keyworth, Alan Pappe	
O C T O B E R	18	I Never Sang for My Father	Columbia Pictures	Gilbert Cates (director); Robert Anderson (screenplay); Melvyn Douglas, Gene Hackman, Dorothy Stickney, Estelle Parsons, Elizabeth Hubbard, Lovelady Powell, Conrad Bain, James Karen, Daniel Keyes, Jon Richards, Gene Williams	
O C T O B E R	20	Le Cercle Rouge (France)	Variety Distribution	Jean-Pierre Melville (director/screenplay); Alain Delon, André Bourvil, Yves Montand, Gian Maria Volonté, Paul Crauchet, Paul Amiot, Pierre Collet, André Ekyan, François Périer, René Berthier, Jean Champion, Yvan Chiffre, Mireille Darc, Robert Favart, Jean-Pierre Posier, Yves Arcanel, Jean-Marc Boris, Anna Douking, Roger Fradet, Édouard Francomme, Jean Franval, Jacques Galland, Jean-Pierre Janic, Pierre Lecomte, Jacques Léonard, Jacques Leroy, Jean Pignol, Robert Rondo	
O C T O B E R	20	Rabbit, Run	Warner Bros.	Jack Smight (director); Howard B. Kreitsek (screenplay); James Caan, Carrie Snodgress, Anjanette Comer, Jack Albertson, Arthur Hill, Melodie Johnson, Henry Jones, Josephine Hutchinson, Don Keefer, Carmen Matthews, Nydia Westman, Marc Antony Van der Nagel, Virginia Vincent, Sandra Scott, Margot Stevenson, Ken Kercheval	
O C T O B E R	21	Little Fauss and Big Halsy	Paramount Pictures / Alfran Productions	Sidney J. Furie (director); Charles K. Eastman (screenplay); Robert Redford, Michael J. Pollard, Lauren Hutton, Noah Beery Jr., Lucille Benson, Linda Gaye Scott, Ray Ballard, Erin O'Reilly, Benjamin Archibek	
O C T O B E R	22	The Conformist (Italy) / (France) / (West Germany)	Paramount Pictures / Mars Film Produzione / Marianne Productions / Maran Film	Bernardo Bertolucci (director/screenplay); Jean-Louis Trintignant, Stefania Sandrelli, Gastone Moschin, Dominique Sanda, Fosco Giachetti, José Quaglio, Pierre Clémenti, Yvonne Sanson, Milly, Giuseppe Addobbati, Alessandro Haber	
O C T O B E R	23	No Blade of Grass	Metro-Goldwyn-Mayer / Theodora Productions	Cornel Wilde (director); Sean Forestal, Jefferson Pascal (screenplay); Nigel Davenport, Jean Wallace, John Hamill, Lynne Frederick, Patrick Holt, Ruth Kettlewell, Tex Fuller, Anthony Sharp, George Coulouris, Anthony May, Wendy Richard, Jimmy Winston	
O C T O B E R	24	Trog	Warner Bros.	Freddie Francis (director); Peter Bryan, John Gilling, Aben Kandel (screenplay); Joan Crawford, Michael Gough, Bernard Kay, Kim Braden, David Griffin, John Hamill, Thorley Walters, Jack May, Simon Lack, Chloe Franks, Geoffrey Case, Joe Cornelius	
O C T O B E R	25	When Dinosaurs Ruled the Earth (U.K.)	Warner Bros. / Hammer Films	Val Guest (director/screenplay); Victoria Vetri, Robin Hawdon, Patrick Allen, Drewe Henley, Sean Caffrey, Magda Konopka, Imogen Hassall, Patrick Holt, Carol Hawkins	
O C T O B E R	28	House of Dark Shadows	Metro-Goldwyn-Mayer	Dan Curtis (director); Sam Hall, Gordon Russell (screenplay); Jonathan Frid, Grayson Hall, Kathryn Leigh Scott, Roger Davis	
O C T O B E R	28	The Private Life of Sherlock Holmes	United Artists / Compton Films / The Mirisch Corporation / Phalanx Productions	Billy Wilder (director/screenplay); I. A. L. Diamond (screenplay); Robert Stephens, Colin Blakely, Geneviève Page, Christopher Lee, Irene Handl, Clive Revill, Tamara Toumanova, Stanley Holloway, Mollie Maureen, Catherine Lacey	
O C T O B E R	28	The Sidelong Glances of a Pigeon Kicker	Metro-Goldwyn-Mayer / Saturn Productions	John Dexter (director); Ron Whyte (screenplay); Jordan Christopher, Jill O'Hara, Robert Walden, Kate Reid, William Redfield, Lois Nettleton, Elaine Stritch, Melba Moore, Kristoffer Tabori, Sylvester Stallone, Boni Enten, Riggs O'Hara, Donald Warfield, Jean Shevlin, Matt Warner	
O C T O B E R	28	The Twelve Chairs	UMC (Universal Marion Corporation) Pictures	Mel Brooks (director/screenplay); Frank Langella, Ron Moody, Dom DeLuise, Andreas Voutsinas, Diana Coupland, Mel Brooks, David Lander, Vlada Petrić, Elaine Garreau, Robert Bernal, Will Stampe	
O C T O B E R	31	Dodes'ka-den (Japan)	Toho / Yonki no Kai Productions	Akira Kurosawa (director/screenplay); Hideo Oguni, Shinobu Hashimoto (screenplay); Yoshitaka Zushi, Kin Sugai, Toshiyuki Tonomura, Shinsuke Minami, Yuko Kusunoki, Junzaburō Ban, Kiyoko Tange, Michio Hino, Keiji Furuyama, Tappei Shimokawa, Kunie Tanaka, Jitsuko Yoshimura, Hisashi Igawa, Hideko Okiyama, Hiroshi Akutagawa, Tomoko Naraoka, Atsushi Watanabe, Kamatari Fujiwara, Kōji Mitsui	
N O V E M B E R	2	Three Sisters	The American Film Theatre / British Lion Films	Laurence Olivier, John Sichel (directors); Moura Budberg (screenplay); Jeanne Watts, Joan Plowright, Louise Purnell, Derek Jacobi, Sheila Reid, Kenneth MacKintosh, Daphne Heard, Harry Lomax, Judy Wilson, Mary Griffiths, Ronald Pickup, Laurence Olivier, Frank Wylie, Alan Bates, Richard Kay, George Selway, Harry Fielder	
N O V E M B E R	3	The Owl and the Pussycat	Columbia Pictures / Rastar	Herbert Ross (director); Buck Henry (screenplay); Barbra Streisand, George Segal, Robert Klein, Allen Garfield, Roz Kelly, Jacques Sandulescu, Jack Manning, Grace Carney, Barbara Anson, Kim Chan, Evelyn Lang, Ken Adam, Tom Atkins, Buck Henry	
N O V E M B E R	5	Scrooge	National General Pictures / Cinema Center Films	Ronald Neame (director); Leslie Bricusse (screenplay); Albert Finney, Alec Guinness, Edith Evans, Kenneth More, Laurence Naismith, Michael Medwin, David Collings, Anton Rodgers, Suzanne Neve, Paddy Stone, Frances Cuka, Richard Beaumont, Karen Scargill, Mary Peach, Gordon Jackson, Kay Walsh, Derek Francis, Roy Kinnear, Geoffrey Bayldon, Molly Weir, Helena Gloag, Reg Lever, Keith Marsh, Marianne Stone	
N O V E M B E R	7	The Phantom Tollbooth	Metro-Goldwyn-Mayer	Chuck Jones (director/screenplay); Abe Levitow, Dave Monahan (directors); Sam Rosen (screenplay); Butch Patrick, Mel Blanc, Daws Butler, Candy Candido, Hans Conried, June Foray, Patti Gilbert, Shepard Menken, Cliff Norton, Larry Thor, Les Tremayne, Thurl Ravenscroft, Mike Davis, Chuck Jones	
N O V E M B E R	8	Scars of Dracula	Continental Films / Hammer Film Productions	Roy Ward Baker (director); Anthony Hinds (screenplay); Christopher Lee, Patrick Troughton, Dennis Waterman, Jenny Hanley, Michael Gwynn, Michael Ripper, Christopher Matthews, Anouska Hempel, Wendy Hamilton, Delia Lindsay, Bob Todd, Toke Townley	
N O V E M B E R	8	The Horror of Frankenstein	Continental Films / Hammer Film Productions	Jimmy Sangster (director/screenplay); Jeremy Burnham (screenplay); Ralph Bates, Kate O'Mara, Veronica Carlson, Dennis Price, Jon Finch, Bernard Archard, James Hayter, Joan Rice, James Cossins, Geoffrey Lumsden, Terry Duggan, Michael Goldie, David Prowse, Graham James, Stephen Turner, Neil Wilson, Glenys O'Brien, Chris Lethbridge-Baker, George Belbin, Hal Jeayes, Carol Jeayes	
N O V E M B E R	9	Ryan's Daughter	Metro-Goldwyn-Mayer	David Lean (director); Robert Bolt (screenplay); Robert Mitchum, Sarah Miles, Trevor Howard, John Mills, Christopher Jones, Leo McKern, Barry Foster, Gerald Sim, Evin Crowley, Marie Kean, Arthur O'Sullivan, Brian O'Higgins, Barry Jackson	
N O V E M B E R	10	Perfect Friday	Chevron Pictures / Sunnymede Film Productions	Peter Hall (director); Scott Forbes, Anthony Greville-Bell (screenplay); Ursula Andress, Stanley Baker, David Warner, Patience Collier, T. P. McKenna, David Waller, Joan Benham, Julian Orchard, Trisha Mortimer, Anne Tirard, Johnny Briggs, Fred Griffiths, Max Faulkner, Carleton Hobbs, Eric Longworth, Howard Lang, Patrick Jordan, Garfield Morgan	
N O V E M B E R	10	Where's Poppa?	United Artists	Carl Reiner (director); Robert Klane (screenplay); George Segal, Ruth Gordon, Ron Leibman, Trish Van Devere, Barnard Hughes, Vincent Gardenia, Rae Allen, Rob Reiner, Paul Sorvino, William Le Massena, Michael McGuire, Martha Greenhouse, Israel Lang, Garrett Morris, Arnold Williams, Buddy Butler, Helen Martin, Tom Atkins, Alice Drummond, Jack Manning, Penny Marshall	
N O V E M B E R	17	The Over-the-Hill Gang Rides Again	ABC / Thomas-Spelling Productions	George McCowan (director); Richard Carr (screenplay); Walter Brennan, Fred Astaire, Edgar Buchanan, Andy Devine, Chill Wills, Paul Richards, Lana Wood, Parley Baer, Walter Burke, Lillian Bronson, Jonathan Hole, Burt Mustin, Don Wilbanks, Pepper Martin, Eddie Quillan	
N O V E M B E R	18	Bartleby (United Kingdom)	British Lion Film Corporation / Pantheon Film Productions / Amber Entertainment	Anthony Friedman (director/screenplay); Rodney Carr-Smith (screenplay); Paul Scofield, John McEnery, Thorley Walters, Colin Jeavons, Robin Askwith, Raymond Mason, Charles Kinross, Neville Barber, Hope Jackman, John Watson, Christine Dingle, Rosalind Elliot, Tony Parkin	
N O V E M B E R	18	Dirty Dingus Magee	Metro-Goldwyn-Mayer	Burt Kennedy (director); Tom Waldman, Frank Waldman, Joseph Heller (screenplay); Frank Sinatra, George Kennedy, Anne Jackson, Lois Nettleton, Jack Elam, Michele Carey, John Dehner, Henry Jones, Harry Carey Jr., Paul Fix, Marya Christen, Terry Wilson, Willis Bouchey, Tom Fadden, Maray Ayres, David S. Cass Sr., Don "Red" Barry, Chuck Hayward, Hal Needham, Grady Sutton	
N O V E M B E R	18	I Walk the Line	Columbia Pictures	John Frankenheimer (director); Alvin Sargent (screenplay); Gregory Peck, Tuesday Weld, Estelle Parsons, Ralph Meeker, Lonny Chapman, Charles Durning, Jane Rose, Nora Denney, Jeff Dalton, Freddie McCloud, J.C. Evans, Margaret A. Morris, Bill Littleton, Leo Yates	
N O V E M B E R	24	The Act of the Heart	Universal Pictures / Quest Film Productions	Paul Almond (director/screenplay); Geneviève Bujold, Donald Sutherland, Monique Leyrac, Sharon Acker, Gilles Vigneault, Claude Jutra, François Tassé, Jean Duceppe, Ratch Wallace, Billy Mitchell, Jean Dalmain	
D E C E M B E R	1	Yousuf Khan Sher Bano (Pakistan)	United Arts	Aziz Tabassum (director); Ali Haider Joshi (screenplay); Yasmin Khan, Badar Munir, Nemat Sarhadi	
D E C E M B E R	4	The Garden of the Finzi-Continis (Italy)	Cinema 5 Distributing	Vittorio De Sica (director); Vittorio Bonicelli, Ugo Pirro (screenplay); Lino Capolicchio, Dominique Sanda, Helmut Berger, Fabio Testi, Romolo Valli, Alessandro D'Alatri, Joshua Sinclair, Martin Bormann, Rudolf Hess, Adolf Hitler, Benito Mussolini, Julius Streicher, Camillo Cesarei, Katina Morisani, Inna Alexeievna, Barbara Pilavin, Ettore Geri, Raffaele Curi, Giampaolo Duregon, Marcella Gentile, Franco Nebbia, Cinzia Bruno	
D E C E M B E R	5	Brewster McCloud	Metro-Goldwyn-Mayer / Lion's Gate Films	Robert Altman (director); Doran William Cannon (screenplay); Bud Cort, Sally Kellerman, Michael Murphy, William Windom, Shelley Duvall, René Auberjonois, Margaret Hamilton, Corey Fischer, Stacy Keach, John Schuck, Bill Adair, Bert Remsen, Jennifer Salt, G. Wood, Marilyn Burns, Dean Goss, William Baldwin, Ronnie Cammick	
D E C E M B E R	6	Gimme Shelter	Cinema 5 Distributing / Maysles Films / Penforta	Albert and David Maysles, Charlotte Zwerin (directors); The Rolling Stones, Jefferson Airplane, The Flying Burrito Brothers, Ike Turner, Tina Turner, Sonny Barger, Melvin Belli, Sam Cutler, Ronnie Schneider, Rock Scully, Stanley Booth, Billy Fritsch	
D E C E M B E R	8	Husbands	Columbia Pictures / Faces Music	John Cassavetes (director/screenplay); Ben Gazzara, Peter Falk, John Cassavetes, Jenny Runacre, Jenny Lee-Wright, Claire Malis, Bill Britten, Judith Lowry, Fred Draper, Nick Cassavetes, Xan Cassavetes, Harry Fielder, Noelle Kao, John Kullers, Meta Shaw, Leola Harlow, Delores Delmar, Eleanor Zee, Peggy Lashbrook, Sarah Felcher, Arthur Clark, Gwen Van Dam, John Armstrong, Charles Gaines, Antoinette Kray, Lorraine MacMartin, Carinthia West, Edgar Franken, Joe Hardy, David Rowlands	
D E C E M B E R	11	The Aristocats	Walt Disney Productions / Buena Vista Distribution	Wolfgang Reitherman (director); Ken Anderson, Larry Clemmons, Eric Cleworth, Vance Gerry, Julius Svendsen, Frank Thomas, Ralph Wright (screenplay); Phil Harris, Eva Gabor	
D E C E M B E R	11	Claire's Knee (France)	Columbia Pictures	Éric Rohmer (director/screenplay); Jean-Claude Brialy, Aurora Cornu, Béatrice Romand, Fabrice Luchini, Laurence de Monaghan, Michèle Montel, Gérard Falconetti	
D E C E M B E R	15	Compañeros (Italy)	Variety Distribution	Sergio Corbucci (director/screenplay); Dino Maiuri, Massimo De Rita, Fritz Ebert (screenplay); Franco Nero, Tomas Milian, Jack Palance, Fernando Rey, Iris Berben, José Bódalo, Eduardo Fajardo, Karin Schubert, Gino Pernice, Gérard Tichy, Álvaro de Luna, Tito García, Lorenzo Robledo	
D E C E M B E R	15	There's a Girl in My Soup	Columbia Pictures	Roy Boulting (director); Terence Frisby, Peter Kortner (screenplay); Peter Sellers, Goldie Hawn, Tony Britton, Nicky Henson, Diana Dors, Judy Campbell, John Comer, Gabrielle Drake, Nicola Pagett, Geraldine Sherman, Thorley Walters, Ruth Trouncer, Françoise Pascal, Christopher Cazenove, Raf De La Torre	
D E C E M B E R	15	The Wild Country	Walt Disney Productions / Buena Vista Distribution	Robert Totten (director); Calvin Clements Jr., Paul Savage (screenplay); Steve Forrest, Vera Miles, Ron Howard, Clint Howard, Dub Taylor, Jack Elam, Frank de Kova, Morgan Woodward, Woodrow Chambliss, Karl Swenson, Mills Watson	
D E C E M B E R	16	Puzzle of a Downfall Child	Universal Pictures	Jerry Schatzberg (director); Adrian Joyce (screenplay); Faye Dunaway, Barry Primus, Viveca Lindfors, Barry Morse, Roy Scheider, John Heffernan, Sydney Walker, Susan Willis, Barbara Carrera, Ruth Jackson, Clark Burckhalter, Shirley Rich, Emerick Bronson, Harry Lee, Jane Halleren, Sam Schacht	
D E C E M B E R	16	Love Story	Paramount Pictures / Love Story Company	Arthur Hiller (director); Erich Segal (screenplay); Ali MacGraw, Ryan O'Neal, John Marley, Ray Milland, Russell Nype, Katherine Balfour, Sydney Walker, Tommy Lee Jones, Robert Modica, Walker Daniels, John Merensky, Andrew Duncan	
D E C E M B E R	17	Alex in Wonderland	Metro-Goldwyn-Mayer	Paul Mazursky (director/screenplay); Larry Tucker (screenplay); Donald Sutherland, Ellen Burstyn, Paul Mazursky, Viola Spolin, Andre Philippe, Michael Tucker, Neil Burstyn, Federico Fellini, Jeanne Moreau, Meg Mazursky, Glenna Sargent, Joan Delaney, Leon Frederick	
D E C E M B E R	17	Rio Lobo	National General Pictures / Cinema Center Films / Malabar Productions	Howard Hawks (director); Burton Wohl, Leigh Brackett (screenplay); John Wayne, Jorge Rivero, Jennifer O'Neill, Christopher Mitchum, Jack Elam, Victor French, Susana Dosamantes, Sherry Lansing, David Huddleston, Mike Henry	
D E C E M B E R	20	Donkey Skin (France)	Cinema International Corporation / Parc Film / Marianne Productions	Jacques Demy (director/screenplay); Catherine Deneuve, Jean Marais, Jacques Perrin, Micheline Presle, Delphine Seyrig, Fernand Ledoux, Henri Crémieux, Sacha Pitoëff, Pierre Repp, Jean Servais, Rufus, Jacques Demy, Michel Legrand, Georges Adet, Annick Berger, Romain Bouteille, Louise Chevalier, Sylvain Corthay	
D E C E M B E R	21	I Love My Wife	Universal Pictures / Wolper Pictures Ltd.	Mel Stuart (director); Robert Kaufman (screenplay); Elliott Gould, Brenda Vaccaro, Angel Tompkins, Dabney Coleman, Leonard Stone, Joan Tompkins, Helen Westcott, Ivor Francis, Al Checco, Joanna Cameron, Veleka Gray, Damian London, Tom Toner, Gloria Manon, Dawn Lyn, Heather North, Janice Pennington, Robert Kaufman	
D E C E M B E R	23	Little Big Man	National General Pictures / Cinema Center Films	Arthur Penn (director); Calder Willingham (screenplay); Dustin Hoffman, Martin Balsam, Jeff Corey, Chief Dan George, Faye Dunaway, Richard Mulligan, Jesse Vint, Jack Bannon, Jack Mullaney, Thayer David, William Hickey, James Anderson, Alan Oppenheimer, Lou Cutell, M. Emmet Walsh, Ken Mayer, Don Brodie, Annette O'Toole, Aimée Eccles, Kelly Jean Peters, Carole Androsky, Robert Little Star, Cal Bellini, Ruben Moreno, Steve Shemayne, Philip Kennealy	
D E C E M B E R	25	There Was a Crooked Man...	Warner Bros.	Joseph L. Mankiewicz (director); David Newman, Robert Benton (screenplay); Kirk Douglas, Henry Fonda, Hume Cronyn, Warren Oates, Burgess Meredith, John Randolph, Lee Grant, Arthur O'Connell, Martin Gabel, Michael Blodgett	
D E C E M B E R	31	Loot			

== See also ==
- List of 1970 box office number-one films in the United States
- 1970 in the United States
