= Willy Kurant =

Belgian cinematographer (1934–2021)

- Born: 15 February 1934; Liège, Belgium
- Died: 3 April 2021 (aged 87); Paris, France
- Other name: Willy Curtis
- Occupation: Cinematographer
- Years active: 1954–2021
- Relatives: Curt Courant (uncle)

Willy Kurant, AFC, ASC (15 February 1934 – 3 April 2021) was a Belgian cinematographer. He began as a documentary cameraman before establishing himself as a director of photography in the French New Wave. He worked with such notable filmmakers as Agnès Varda, Jean-Luc Godard, Orson Welles, Alain Robbe-Grillet, Jerzy Skolimowski, Chris Marker, and Maurice Pialat. He was nominated for a César Award for Best Cinematography for his work on Under the Sun of Satan (1987).

== Early life ==
Kurant was born in 1934 in Liège, Belgium, the son of two Polish immigrants, Jankiel Icek Kurant and Tema Feuer. He was the nephew of the German cinematographer Curt Courant (1899-1968).

Kurant lived in Liège until the age of eight, when, due to World War II, he was forced to move to the Belgian countryside with his older sister and her husband. Kurant was later sent to an orphanage, where he lived until the age of 17. As a teen, Kurant read issues of American Cinematographer magazine at an American Cultural Center.

== Career ==
Kurant was initially reluctant to pursue a career as a cinematographer, instead studying still photography. While working at a job processing film at a research lab in France, Kurant took an evening class at a small film school; it was then that he decided to pursue cinematography as a career.

Kurant began his career as a cameraman in 1954, when he spent six months in the Belgian Congo as part of a documentary film crew. There, he worked on ten short propaganda films produced for the Ministry of Overseas France and her Colonies, and upon returning to Belgium, Kurant worked as a news cameraman for a television station. In 1957, Kurant received a scholarship to study as a trainee cameraman at Pinewood Studios. There, he worked as first assistant cameraman to English cinematographers Geoffrey Unsworth (on A Night to Remember), Harry Waxman (on Innocent Sinners) and Jack Hildyard (on The Gypsy and the Gentleman).

At the 1958 World's Fair in Brussels, Kurant saw a German film crew using an Arriflex camera. This inspired Kurant to buy a camera of his own, as well as a set of lenses and a sound recorder. He then worked extensively as a freelance cameraman, travelling to Vietnam and again to the Congo. In 1962, Kurant moved to France to formally study cinematography.

Kurant then began to establish himself as a cinematographer, shooting shorts for filmmakers such as Jacques Rozier and Marin Karmitz. In 1966, Kurant shot his first two features: Agnès Varda's The Creatures and Jean-Luc Godard's Masculin Feminin. Both films were shot in high-contrast black-and-white on 4X, a then-new Kodak film stock; Kurant later referred to the films' distinctive look as his "signature."

The next year, Kurant shot the TV movie Anna, directed by Pierre Koralnik starring Godard's ex-wife, Anna Karina. The film was co-written and scored by musician Serge Gainsbourg; this marked the first of several film collaborations between Kurant and Gainsbourg.

Around the same time, Kurant served as the cinematographer on Orson Welles' French production, The Immortal Story. Welles then hired Kurant as the cinematographer for his thriller The Deep, which spent three years in production but was never finished.

In 1968, Kurant shot his first American film, The Night of the Following Day. In the 1980s, he worked on two films with director Maurice Pialat: A Nos Amours, from which Kurant was fired after two weeks of shooting, and the Palme d'Or-winning Under the Sun of Satan. He also worked on Boris Szulzinger's Mama Dracula (1980). Kurant also collaborated extensively with musician Serge Gainsbourg.

Kurant was a member of the French Society of Cinematographers and the American Society of Cinematographers. Later in his career, Kurant shot a handful of films in the United States, including The Baby-Sitters Club and Pootie Tang. His most recent feature is Un été brûlant (2011), directed by Philippe Garrel; it marked Kurant's first work in seven years.

== Death ==
Kurant died in Paris at the age of 87, on 3 April 2021.

== Filmography ==
=== Feature films ===
Year	Title	Director	Notes
1966	Masculine Feminine	Jean-Luc Godard	
1966	The Creatures	Agnès Varda	
1966	Trans-Europ-Express	Alain Robbe-Grillet	
1967	Mon amour Mon amour	Nadine Trintignant	
1967	The Departure	Jerzy Skolimowski	
1967	Far from Vietnam	Jean-Luc Godard	
1967	Au pan coupé	Guy Gilles	
1967	The Heroine	Orson Welles	
1968	The Immortal Story	Orson Welles	
1969	The Night of the Following Day	Hubert Cornfield; Richard Boone	
1969	Man on Horseback	Volker Schlöndorff	
1969	Tout peut arriver	Philippe Labro	
1970	Bhakti	Maurice Béjart	
1970	Le temps de mourir	André Farwagi	
1970	The Deep	Orson Welles	Unfinished
1970	Cannabis	Pierre Koralnik	
1972	Pink Floyd: Live at Pompeii	Adrian Maben	Concert film
1974	Les jours gris	Iradj Azimi	
1976	Je t'aime moi non plus	Serge Gainsbourg	
1977	The Incredible Melting Man	William Sachs	
1978	Harper Valley P.T.A.	Richard C. Bennett; Ralph Senensky	
1980	Running Scared	Paul Glickler	
1980	Mama Dracula	Boris Szulzinger	
1981	The Killing of America	Sheldon Renan	
1982	Tag: The Assassination Game	Nick Castle	
1983	Les îles	Iradj Azimi	
1983	Équateur	Serge Gainsbourg	
1985	Tuff Turf	Fritz Kiersch	
1986	Flagrant désir	Claude Faraldo	
1986	A State of Emergency	Richard C. Bennett	
1986	Charlotte for Ever	Serge Gainsbourg	
1987	Under the Sun of Satan	Maurice Pialat	
1987	Milan noir	Ronald Chammah	
1989	Un été d'orages	Charlotte Brändström	
1990	Aventure de Catherine C.	Pierre Beuchot	
1991	La contre-allée	Isabel Sebastien	
1992	Day of Atonement	Alexandre Arcady	
1993	Cuisine et dépendances	Philippe Muyl	
1994	A Business Affair	Charlotte Brändström	
1994	China Moon	John Bailey	
1994	Priez pour nous	Jean-Pierre Vergne	
1995	Le petit garçon	Pierre Granier-Deferre	
1995	The Baby-Sitters Club	Melanie Mayron	
1995	White Man's Burden	Desmond Nakano	
1997	Day and Night	Bernard-Henri Lévy	
2001	Delivering Milo	Nick Castle	
2001	Pootie Tang	Louis C.K.	
2011	A Burning Hot Summer	Philippe Garrel	
2013	Jealousy	Philippe Garrel	

=== Television ===
Year	Project	Notes
1963	Cinq colonnes à la une	Episode: "September 6, 1963"
1967	Anna	Television film
1978	Outside Chance	Television film
1979	ABC Afterschool Specials	Episode: "Dinky Hocker"
1997	Rose Hill	Television film
1998	The New Swiss Family Robinson	Television film
