= Banzet =

Banzet is a French surname. Notable people with the surname include:

- Janet Banzet (1934–1971), American actress
- Josette Banzet (1938–2020), French-born American-based actress
- Sara Banzet (1745–1774), French educator and diarist
