= Cannabis (soundtrack) =

Film score of Cannabis by Serge Gainsbourg
- Released: May 1970
- Recorded: Studio Davout; Paris, France
- Genre: Art rock
- Length: 29:24
- Language: French, English
- Label: Philips
- Producer: Roger Duchet, Nat Wachselberger

Serge Gainsbourg chronology
Slogan (1969)	Cannabis (1970)	Histoire de Melody Nelson (1971)

Cannabis is a film score by French singer-songwriter Serge Gainsbourg, released in May 1970 through Philips Records, accompanying the 1970 film of the same name, directed by Pierre Koralnik and starring Gainsbourg, Jane Birkin, and Curd Jürgens.

== Conception ==
=== Background ===
After collaborating on Anna, a 1967 television movie starring Anna Karina, Gainsbourg and French director Pierre Koralnik decided to work on another movie which would eventually become Cannabis, when three producers (Roger Duchet, Andrée Debar, and Nat Wachsberger) commissioned one, based on seeing Gainsbourg and his then-lover Jane Birkin starring together in the 1969 film, Slogan, directed by Pierre Grimblat. All of the music for Cannabis was composed and written by Gainsbourg after the film had been shot, with help from arranger Jean-Claude Vannier, with whom Gainsbourg would again collaborate the following year on Histoire de Melody Nelson.

=== Recording ===
Cannabis was recorded at Studio Davout, a recording studio in Paris, France, with producers Roger Duchet and Nat Wachselberger.

== Reception ==
Professional ratings
Review scores
Source	Rating
Allmusic	4.5/5 stars

Upon its release, Cannabis was received positively. Thom Jurek of Allmusic wrote that it was "among the most startling [...] in [Gainsbourg's] oeuvre", and also noted that the score was "one of the most sophisticated [...] Gainsbourg ever conceived".

== Track listing ==
All music composed by Serge Gainsbourg and arranged by Jean-Claude Vannier.

Side one
No.	Title	Length
1.	"Cannabis"	2:28
2.	"Le Deuxième Homme"	1:10
3.	"Première blessure"	2:25
4.	"Danger"	2:09
5.	"Chanvre indien"	2:27
6.	"Arabique"	1:30
7.	"I Want to Feel Crazy"	1:41

Side two
No.	Title	Length
8.	"Cannabis" (vocals by Serge Gainsbourg)	2:29
9.	"Jane dans la nuit" (vocals by Jane Birkin)	1:24
10.	"Avant de mourir"	5:25
11.	"Dernière blessure"	1:23
12.	"Piège"	3:10
13.	"Cannabis-bis"	1:51
Total length:		29:24

== Release history ==
Region	Date	Label	Format	Catalog
France	May 1970	Philips Records	LP	6311 060
Canada	23 August 1970	Disques Bagatelle	LP	BAS 602
France	2008	Philips Records	LP	6311 060
