= Cannabis (film) =

1970 film

- Theatrical release poster
- Directed by: Pierre Koralnik
- Screenplay by: Frantz-André Burguet; Pierre Koralnik
- Based on: ...et puis s'en vont by F.S. Gilbert
- Produced by: Roger Duchet; Nat Wachsberger
- Starring: Serge Gainsbourg; Jane Birkin; Paul Nicholas; Curd Jurgens
- Cinematography: Willy Kurant
- Edited by: Françoise Collin
- Music by: Serge Gainsbourg
- Production companies: Euro-France Films; Capitole Films; Produzioni Cinematografiche Europee; Roxy-Film
- Release dates: September 2, 1970 (France); October 23, 1970 (West Germany); February 2, 1973 (Italy)
- Running time: 95 minutes
- Countries: France; Italy; West Germany
- Language: French

Cannabis is a 1970 crime film directed by Pierre Koralnik. It is a co-production between France, West Germany and Italy. It stars Serge Gainsbourg, Jane Birkin, Paul Nicholas and Curd Jürgens.

== Cast ==
- Serge Gainsbourg as Serge Morgan
- Jane Birkin as Jane
- Paul Nicholas as Paul
- Curd Jürgens as Henri Emery
- Gabriele Ferzetti as Inspector Bardeche
- Paul Albert Krumm as Lancan
- Yvette Lebon as Emery's Mistress
- Laurence Badie as Madame Carbona
- Rita Renoir
- Mario Brega

== Production ==
Cannabis is Pierre Koralnik's first theatrical feature film. He had previously directed a television film Anna (1967) which featured music composed and performed by Serge Gainsbourg. Gainsbourg was appreciative of Koralnik's work and became friends with him and was determined to work with him again. Other crew members of Anna would return to work on Cannabis, including cinematographer Willy Kurant.

The producers of Cannabis took advantage of a relationship that had developed between Jane Birkin and Gainsbourg of their re-recorded version of the song "Je t'aime... moi non plus" which was released in 1969 and the film they had been in together that was a hit: The Pleasure Pit (1969). The film was produced by the Paris-based production companies Euro-France Films and Capitole Films and the Rome-based Produzioni cinematografiche Europee and the Munich-based Roxy Film GmbH. Some cast members such as Curd Jürgens and Gabriele Ferzetti were imposed by the German and Italian co-producers respectively. For a time, the film was known as Gymkhana, but the title Cannabis was imposed by the producers who felt the word was still taboo at the time and would help attract an audience.

The film is based on the novel ... et puis s'en vont. The novel was credited to F.S. Gilbert, a pseudonym that was screenwriter Michel Fabre and Jacques Sergune. Koralnik said he was forced to use the book as the rights to have been brought as to feature Birkin and Gainsbourgh in "the best possible way." To write the screenplay, Koralnik partnered with Frantz-André Burguet, a novelist and literary critic who had previously cowritten dialogue for Vittorio De Seta's L'invitata (1969).

The film was shot between October 20 to December 15, 1969. Koralnik said the film suffered from the usual problems of international co-productions. Birkin said that Koralnik wanted to make a more personal film, one where the story had very little importance. The score for Cannabis was composed and written by Gainsbourg after the film had been shot. It was made with help from arranger Jean-Claude Vannier, with whom Gainsbourg would again collaborate again with for his album Histoire de Melody Nelson (1971).

== Release ==
Cannabis was released in France on September 2, 1970. The film's box office in France had 405,079 entries which the authors of French Thrillers of the 1970s: Volume I, Crime Films (2026) described as a "box office disappointment." Cannabis was later screened in West Germany in October 23, 1970 and February 2, 1973 in Italy.

The film was released on December 19, 1973 in Macon, Georgia as The Mafia Wants Blood. It was released on VHS in 1987 by Star Classics as French Intrigue.

== See also ==
- List of French films of 1970
