= List of French films of 1970 =

A list of French film production that were first released 1970.

== Films ==
Title	Director	Cast	Genre	Notes
L'Ardoise	Claude Bernard-Aubert	Salvatore Adamo, Jess Hahan, Élisabeth Wiener		French-Italian co-production
Le Bal du comte d'Orgel	Marc Allégret		Drama	
Bed and Board	François Truffaut	Jean-Pierre Léaud, Claude Jade, Hiroko Berghauer	Comedy drama, romance	French-Italian co-production
The Blood Rose	Claude Mulot	Anny Duperey, Philippe Lemaire, Howard Vernon		
Bocce cucite	Pino Tossini	Lou Castel, Carla Romanelli, Roland Carey	Crime	Italian-French co-production
Borsalino	Jacques Deray	Alain Delon, Jean-Paul Belmondo, Michel Bouquet	Crime	French-Italian co-production
Le Boucher	Claude Chabrol	Stéphane Audran, Jean Yanne, Pasquale Ferone	Thriller	French-Italian co-production
Cannabis	Pierre Koralnik	Serge Gainsbourg, Jane Birkin, Paul Nicholas	Crime	French-Italian-West German co-production
Céleste	Michel Gast	Débora Duarte, Jean Rochefort, Lea Massari		French-Italian co-production
Le Cercle rouge	Jean-Pierre Melville	Alain Delon, Bourvil, Gian Maria Volonté	Crime	French-Italian co-production
Claire's Knee	Éric Rohmer	Jean-Claude Brialy, Aurora Cornu, Béatrice Romand	Comedy-drama	
The Confession	Costa-Gavras	Yves Montand, Simone Signoret, Michel Vitold	Drama	French-Italian co-production
The Conformist	Bernardo Bertolucci	Jean-Louis Trintignant, Dominique Sanda, Pierre Clémenti	Drama	Italian-French-West German co-production
The Cop	Yves Boisset	Michel Bouquet, Françoise Fabian, Gianni Garko	Crime	French-Italian co-production
Cran d'arrêt	Yves Boisset	Bruno Cremer, Renaud Verley, Marianne Comtell	Crime	French-Italian co-production
Le Distrait	Pierre Richard	Pierre Richard, Marie-Christine Barrault, Bernard Blier	Comedy, romance	
Donkey Skin	Jacques Demy	Catherine Deneuve, Jean Marais, Jacques Perrin	Fantasy	French-Spanish co-production
L'Eden et Après	Alain Robbe-Grillet	Catherine Jourdan, Pierre Zimmer, Lorraine Rainer	Comedy-drama	Czechoslovak-French co-production
Elise ou la vraie vie	Michel Drach	Marie-José Nat, Mohamed Chouikh, Bernadette Lafont	Drama	French-Algerian co-production
Et qu'ça saute !	Guy Lefranc	Henri Salvador, Michel Galabru, Jean Le Poulain	Comedy	
Le gendarme en balade	Jean Girault	Louis de Funès, Claude Gensac, Michel Galabru	Comedy	French-Italian co-production
La Horse	Pierre Granier-Deferre	Jean Gabin, Danièle Ajoret, Michel Barbey	Crime	French-Italian-West German co-production
La Peau de torpédo	Jean Delannoy	Stéphane Audran, Klaus Kinski, Lilli Palmer		French-West German-Italian co-production
Le Dernier Saut	Édouard Luntz	Maurice Ronet, Michel Bouquet, Cathy Rosier	Crime	French-Italian co-production
Moonlighting Mistress	Wolfgang Becker	Ruth Maria Kubitschek, Harald Leipnitz, Véronique Vendell	Thriller	West Germany-French
The Novices	Guy Casaril	Brigitte Bardot, Annie Girardot, Jacques Jouanneau	Comedy	French-Italian co-production
OSS 117 prend des vacances	Pierre Kalfon	Luc Merenda, Elsa Martinelli, Edwige Feuillère	Spy	French-Brazilian co-production
Point de chute	Robert Hossein	Johnny Hallyday, Robert Hossein, Pascale Rivault		
Rider on the Rain	René Clément	Marlène Jobert, Charles Bronson, Annie Cordy	Crime	French-Italian co-production
Qui?	Léonard Keigel	Romy Schneider, Maurice Ronet	Thriller	French-Italian co-production
Solo	Jean-Pierre Mocky	Jean-Pierre Mocky, Sylvie Bréal, Anne Deleuze		French-Belgian co-production
Le Temps des loups	Sergio Gobbi	Robert Hossein, Charles Aznavour, Virna Lisi		French-Italian co-production
Le Territoire des autres	François Bel, Gérard Vienne, Michel Fano		Documentary	
The Things of Life	Claude Sautet	Michel Piccoli, Romy Schneider	Drama, romance	French-Italian co-production
Too Small Ticky	Eddy Matalon	Jane Birkin, Michael Dunn, Bernard Fresson	Crime	
Tristana	Luis Buñuel	Catherine Deneuve, Fernando Rey, Franco Nero	Drama	French-Italian-Spanish co-production
La Vampire Nue	Jean Rollin	Olivier Martin, Maurice Lemaître, Caroline Cartier		
Vertige pour un tueur	Jean-Pierre Desagnat	Marcel Bozzuffi, Sylva Koscina, Marc Cassot		French-Italian co-production
Le Voyou	Claude Lelouch	Jean-Louis Trintignant, Christine Lelouch, Charles Gerard		French-Italian co-production
The Wild Child	François Truffaut	Jean-Pierre Cargol, François Truffaut	Drama	French-Italian co-production

== Notes ==
=== Sources ===
- Curti, Roberto (2013). Italian Crime Filmography 1968-1980. Jefferson, North Carolina: McFarland & Company. ISBN 978-0-7864-6976-5.
- Curti, Roberto; Lafond, Frank (2026). French Thrillers of the 1970s: Volume I, Crime Films. Jefferson, North Carolina: McFarland & Company. ISBN 978-1-4766-8681-3. LCCN 2025048366.
- Erickson, Hal. "Claire's Knee". AllMovie. Archived from the original on June 23, 2013.
- Erickson, Hal. "The Conformist". AllMovie. Archived from the original on February 28, 2012.
- Erickson, Hal. "Le Distrait". AllMovie. Archived from the original on June 13, 2013.
- Erlewine, Iotis. "Le Bal du Comte d'Orgel". AllMovie. Archived from the original on June 25, 2012.
- Hobart, Tana. "L'Aveu". AllMovie. Archived from the original on July 28, 2012.
- Pavlides, Dan. "Eden and After". AllMovie. Archived from the original on July 19, 2013.
