= The Night God Screamed =

1971 film by Lee Madden

- Directed by: Lee Madden
- Written by: Gil Lasky
- Produced by: Ed Carlin and Gil Lasky
- Starring: Jeanne Crain; Alex Nicol; Daniel Spelling
- Cinematography: Stephen Larner
- Edited by: Mark Dennis
- Music by: Donald Vincent
- Production company: Lasky/Carlin Productions
- Distributed by: Cinemation Industries
- Release date: 1971
- Running time: 85 minutes
- Country: United States
- Language: English

The Night God Screamed is a 1971 American psychological thriller/horror film, independently made on a low budget by Lasky/Carlin Productions (producers Ed Carlin and Gil Lasky, with Lasky writing the screenplay). Due to the sensitivities connected with displaying such a provocative title, theater owners in small town and rural communities were offered the option of using the simple alternative, Scream. The film was directed by Lee Madden.

== Plot ==
At a lakeside ceremony, a Christlike cult leader named Billy Joe tells his teenage congregants that there is a traitor among them. He indicates a specific girl, who starts to run but is quickly caught and "baptized" by a hooded figure called the Atoner until she drowns.

While walking through a rundown neighborhood, Fanny Pierce, a reverend's wife, has a bag of groceries stolen by a homeless man. She continues undaunted to the church kitchen, while her husband, Willis, pours coffee for the destitute men assembled for a free meal. Fanny expresses her increasing unhappiness, telling him about the stolen groceries. He reassures her that things will get better and that he's rented a quality hall for the evening's revival meeting.

On their way there, the couple stops at a gas station, where the enormous cross in their pickup truck catches the eye of Billy Joe, riding by on the back of a motorcycle driven by his friend Tennessee. As the astonished evangelist watches, the Christ lookalike climbs into the back of the truck and lays in a crucifixion pose upon the cross. He compliments Willis on the cross and asks what he plans to do with it. The two discuss the evening's revival, and Willis invites the men to attend. Billy Joe seems intrigued, while Tennessee makes inappropriate advances toward Fanny. As the parties go their separate ways, Willis dismisses Billy Joe as a cultist.

That evening, Willis delivers his sermon and asks for donations to help run his mission. Paul, a deacon, is taking the offering when he notices Billy Joe in the audience. Afterward, Willis is leaving when he is confronted by the silent Atoner, carrying his tall cruciform staff. Meanwhile, Fanny is outside, baring her soul to Paul about the couple's meager existence, when she hears Willis' cries from inside. She returns to see him being crucified and murdered on the couple's giant cross. Running back outside for help, she discovers that Paul has driven away and the streets are deserted. Later, in court, Billy Joe swears vengeance when Judge Coogan sentences him, Tennessee, and another cohort, Izzy, to death for Willis' murder. Of the killers, only the Atoner remains at large.

A year passes. Fanny is working as a housekeeper for Judge Coogan and his wife. When the couple plans a long weekend getaway, they ask Fanny to supervise their four teenage children, Peter, Nancy, Sharon and Jimmy. The childless Fanny reluctantly agrees, provided the kids stay home the entire time so she doesn't have to worry about them. The kids, who all had plans, are quite annoyed by the restriction.

Two bikers observe the departure of the judge and his wife. Fanny has barely settled in when she begins receiving disturbing and threatening phone calls. The kids spot someone in the backyard and Fanny goes outside to chase him off, finding only a stuffed dummy with a note attached that reads "vengeance", which she keeps hidden from the children. Angered, Fanny sets out to secure the remote house. Peter, the judge's eldest child, says that he saw a hooded figure in the backyard and that Fanny's presence is endangering them all. Thinking he hears a break-in, Peter tells Jimmy to run to a neighbor's house, but the hooded figure looms outside. The lights go out and the children express fear for their lives. Voices are heard calling "God is on our side". Jimmy decides to run for help, and Fanny watches as the hooded figure catches up with him and stabs him to death, but tells his siblings that he got away. Peter discovers the "vengeance" note Fanny found on the dummy and confronts Fanny.

The back door opens and a hooded figure enters the house, beginning a game of cat-and-mouse with Fanny, who races from room to room trying to find the children before they're all killed. Screams and the voices of the intruders are heard throughout the house. Fanny finds Peter's body hanging in a closet. The lights go out again and she barricades herself in a room alone. She hears the attackers' voices and Nancy's pleas for her own life. Fanny leaves her hiding place and runs into Nancy, and the two of them find Sharon's lifeless body on the couch. As they flee, Fanny finds a butcher knife and, screaming in desperation, runs to confront a hooded assailant descending the stairs. Following a brief struggle, she falls backwards and rolls down the staircase.

The hooded figure reveals himself to be Peter who, aided by his siblings, staged all the terrifying events to frighten Fanny into running away and freeing them to participate in their planned activities. As the "murdered" Sharon rises from the couch, the children discover that Fanny is dead. As they discuss a plausible story to tell the police, the phone rings. Peter picks up and hears an ominous voice say, "the sentence is death on Judge Coogan's children and the execution is tonight". In front of the house, the Atoner stands with his cruciform staff. The house's brightly lit windows go dark and a male voice screams from inside.

== Cast ==
- Jeanne Crain as Fanny Pierce
- Alex Nicol as Willis Pierce
- Daniel Spelling as Peter Coogan
- Michael Sugich as Billy Joe Harlan
- Barbara Hancock as Nancy Coogan
- Dawn Cleary as Sharon Coogan
- Gary Morgan as Jimmy Coogan
- Stewart Bradley as Judge Coogan
- James Sikking as Deacon Paul
- Corinne Conley as Betty Coogan
- Miller Petitt as Tennessee
- Richard Smedley as Izzy
- Jack Donner as Prosecutor
- Eric Boles as Wade
- Andrea Darvi as Kathy
- Suzan Sheppard as Kim
- James Waring as Bikerider
- Terry Pratt as Bikerider

== Production ==
The Night God Screamed was produced in 1971. This was Jeanne Crane's last film.

== Release ==
Copyrighted in 1971 and intermittently distributed between 1971 and 1974 by exploitation producer Jerry Gross' soon-to-be-bankrupt Cinemation Industries, the sparsely exhibited feature was directed by Lee Madden. Academy Award nominee Jeanne Crain received top billing.

=== Home media ===
The film was released on VHS by Trans World Entertainment.

=== Reception ===
The Creature Features Movie Guide described the film as a "low-budget job, inadequately directed by Lee Madden and leadenly scripted by Gil Lasky". The Motion Picture Guide (1987 edition) assigned 1 star (out of 5) and says that "the film is as intelligent as the synopsis implies", while Videohound's Golden Movie Retriever gave the film its lowest rating, "WOOF!" (out of possible four bones). The Terror Trap was kinder, giving the film 3/4 stars and calling it "a suspenseful thriller with a nice shock ending." Fred Beldin from Allmovie wrote, "The Night God Screamed is an effective thriller that builds a quiet tension throughout, but stumbles with a weak 'twist' ending."

== See also ==
- List of American films of 1971
