= Like the Lion's Tooth =

- Author: Marjorie Kellogg
- Language: English
- Publication date: 1972

Like the Lion's Tooth, the second novel by Marjorie Kellogg, was first published in 1972. It is the story of dislocated, abused and abandoned children who come together at a school for "problem children" not far from New York City. In that meeting, with the help of each other and well-intentioned if at times misguided staff, they learn ways to cope with a world that is anything but kind to them.

== Reception ==
The book received reviews from publications including Kirkus Reviews, Publishers Weekly and The New York Times.

Kirkus Reviews said that the novel was "neither as arresting nor as original nor as touchingly lacerating as" Kellogg's first book, Tell Me That You Love Me, Junie Moon.
