= The Liberation of L.B. Jones =

1970 film by William Wyler

- DVD cover
- Directed by: William Wyler
- Screenplay by: Jesse Hill Ford; Stirling Silliphant
- Based on: The Liberation of Lord Byron Jones; 1965 novel by Jesse Hill Ford
- Produced by: A. Ronald Lubin
- Starring: Lee J. Cobb; Anthony Zerbe; Roscoe Lee Browne; Lee Majors; Barbara Hershey; Yaphet Kotto; Chill Wills; Lola Falana
- Cinematography: Robert Surtees
- Edited by: Carl Kress
- Music by: Elmer Bernstein
- Production company: Liberation Company
- Distributed by: Columbia Pictures
- Release date: March 18, 1970
- Running time: 102 minutes
- Country: United States
- Language: English
- Budget: $3.5 million
- Box office: $1.3 million (US/ Canada rentals)

The Liberation of L.B. Jones is a 1970 American neo-noir film directed by William Wyler, his final project in a career that spanned 45 years.

The screenplay by Jesse Hill Ford and Stirling Silliphant is based on Ford's 1965 novel The Liberation of Lord Byron Jones. The novel, in turn, was based on events that happened in a Southern town where writer Ford lived. After he wrote the book, he was verbally attacked for writing about the events that had occurred in his town. The motion picture's release added to the controversy, especially in Humboldt, Tennessee, where Ford lived.

The film stars Roscoe Lee Browne, Lee J. Cobb, Lola Falana, Anthony Zerbe, Lee Majors, Arch Johnson, Yaphet Kotto, Eve McVeagh, Chill Wills, and Barbara Hershey in an early role.

== Plot ==
L.B. Jones, a wealthy African-American funeral director in fictional Somerton, Tennessee, seeks legal representation from the local law firm run by Oman Hedgepath and his newlywed nephew Steve Mundine. Jones is seeking a divorce from his considerably younger wife Emma, alleging she had an affair with white police officer Willie Joe Worth, whom he suspects is the biological father of her unborn child.

In an effort to avoid a public scandal, Worth begs Emma not to contest the divorce, but she hopes to collect enough alimony to allow her to maintain the lavish lifestyle to which she has become accustomed. When she refuses to cooperate, Worth severely beats her, then, with the aid of fellow officer Stanley Bumpas, arrests Jones on false charges after he refuses to withdraw the divorce suit.

Jones escapes and eventually cornered, he confronts the officers and is handcuffed. He quietly and respectfully refuses to cooperate even at gunpoint, and Worth murders him, with Bumpas casually watching. Worth, initially cool, is suddenly horrified by what he has done and then even more so at Bumpas's subsequent but cold-bloodedly practical actions in treating Jones's body like it was a side of beef and hanging it from a wrecker hook.

Bumpas slashes the body and removes Jones's shoelaces to make it look like it was done by other Black individuals in a revenge-type killing. Initially another Black man and Emma are forced to confess to the murder, but Hedgepath quickly discovers that the man was in jail at the time of the murder, and also the confessions were obtained with a cattle prod, which appears to be commonplace at the jail.

The charges are immediately dropped, and Worth, who has been shocked by his own actions, turns himself in and confesses to Hedgepath and the mayor, in part suggesting that Hedgepath may have accidentally, but with no intent, influenced him to take action.

Worth is willing to take all responsibility. However, he and Bumpas are not held accountable by City Attorney Hedgepath, who in typical Southern fashion, sweeps the problem under the rug and makes himself a true accessory after the fact by disposing of the murder weapon, and the murder is covered up quietly. The mayor wants nothing to do with any of this and is happy that Hedgepath handles it so as not to disrupt the reputation of the community.

Hedgepath props up Worth enough with thoughts of his family so that Worth accepts the burden of guilt without the need to confess, and although he gives Worth a choice, it is clear that Hedgepath has significant influence over Worth. The two officers are not held accountable for their actions. However, almost immediately, Bumpas, off duty, is murdered very deliberately and coolly by Sonny Boy Mosby in partial retaliation for a vicious beating he once inflicted on the man.

Sonny had recently decided not to retaliate against Bumpas for the beating, but the murder and cutting up of Jones was apparently the final straw for Mosby. The murder is gruesome, but Sonny makes it appear to be an agricultural accident rather than a revenge killing.

Worth keeps his job; Emma is under the presumption she will be getting Jones's money, although there is a suggestion that she might have a little guilt and will be ostracized by the Black community. Hedgepath is apparently abandoned by the remnants of his family, with the Mundines moving out. Mosby, unsuspected, leaves town on a train, apparently with a clear conscience but a look of maturity.

== Cast ==
- Roscoe Lee Browne as L.B. Jones
- Lee J. Cobb as Oman Hedgepath
- Lee Majors as Steve Mundine
- Anthony Zerbe as Willie Joe Worth
- Lola Falana as Emma Jones
- Arch Johnson as Stanley Bumpas
- Barbara Hershey as Nella Mundine
- Yaphet Kotto as Sonny "Sonny Boy" Mosby
- Chill Wills as Mr. Ike
- Dub Taylor as Mayor
- Eve McVeagh as Mrs. Griggs

== Production ==
Ford wrote the first screenplay himself, and then Stirling Silliphant was brought in to do a draft for $200,000. William Wyler was paid $600,000. Shooting took place from 2 June to 11 July 1969. Some scenes of the film were shot in Brownsville, Tennessee, most notably at the now-defunct train station.

== Release ==
The film was released March 18, 1970, in four theaters in Chicago, New York (2), and Los Angeles and grossed $151,000 in its opening week. In the two theaters in New York, Variety noted that the audience in the opening week was 90% Black. After eight weeks of release, it became number one at the US box office.

== Critical reception ==
Wyler's last screen film received mixed reviews; some, appreciating his effort, felt it was not powerful enough. In his review in The New York Times, Vincent Canby wrote, "I'm sure that Wyler and his screenwriters...were out to make a suspense movie that would also work as contemporary social commentary. In the interests of melodrama, they have simplified the characters from Hill's novel to such a degree that they seem more stereotyped than may have been absolutely necessary...Wyler's direction is notable only for the coldness and for an impatience to get on with the story at the expense of any feeling of real involvement... I must say I wasn't bored by it, just depressed."

Variety called it "not much more than an interracial sexploitation film." They said that reviews in New York were mildly favorable.

TV Guide rates it two out of a possible four stars and comments, "Though the cast gives some strong performances, ultimately the film is an empty affair. The questions of racism and Southern prejudice had been well handled by other films long before this. Had it been made 10 years earlier, it would have been a landmark, but in 1970 it was no longer fresh material. The script is pockmarked with cliches and stereotypes, though the technical aspects are fine. This last film of director Wyler was nothing special."

== Awards and nominations ==
Lola Falana was nominated for the Golden Globe Award for New Star of the Year – Actress.

== See also ==
- List of American films of 1970
