= Tell Me That You Love Me, Junie Moon =

1970 American film

- Original Poster by Saul Bass
- Directed by: Otto Preminger
- Screenplay by: Marjorie Kellogg
- Based on: Tell Me That You Love Me, Junie Moon; 1968 novel by Marjorie Kellogg
- Produced by: Otto Preminger
- Starring: Liza Minnelli; Ken Howard; Robert Moore; James Coco; Kay Thompson; Fred Williamson; Pete Seeger
- Cinematography: Boris Kaufman
- Edited by: Henry Herman; Dean O. Ball
- Music by: Philip Springer
- Production company: Sigma Productions
- Distributed by: Paramount Pictures
- Release dates: May 10, 1970 (Cannes); July 1, 1970 (New York)
- Running time: 113 minutes
- Country: United States
- Language: English

Tell Me That You Love Me, Junie Moon is a 1970 American comedy-drama film directed and produced by Otto Preminger. The film is based on the 1968 novel of the same name by Marjorie Kellogg.

== Plot ==
Junie Moon is a girl whose face was scarred in a vicious battery acid attack by her boyfriend Jesse. In an institution, she meets Arthur, who lives with epilepsy, and Warren, a gay paraplegic who uses a wheelchair. The trio are disabled but not down, and they decide to live together in an older, rented house, determined to help one another and to prove themselves.

== Cast ==
- Liza Minnelli as Junie Moon
- Ken Howard as Arthur
- Robert Moore as Warren
- James Coco as Mario
- Kay Thompson as Gregory
- Fred Williamson as Beach Boy
- Ben Piazza as Jesse
- Leonard Frey as Guiles
- Anne Revere as Miss Farber
- Julie Bovasso as Ramona
- Clarice Taylor as Minnie
- Angelique Pettyjohn as Melissa
- Wayne Tippit as Dr. Miller
- Nancy Marchand as Nurse Oxford
- Ric O'Barry as Joebee (credited as Ric O'Feldman)
- Lynn Milgrim as Nurse Holt

=== Musicians ===
- Pete Seeger ("Old Devil Time")
- Pacific Gas & Electric ("The Rake", "Work Your Show", "Elvira")

== Production ==
Preminger acquired the screen rights to the Marjorie Kellogg novel in September 1968 prior to its October release and hired her to write a screenplay. In the book, Junie's whole face was scarred but this was changed to only one side for the film. Rehearsals for the film took place in June 1969, during which time Minnelli's mother, Judy Garland, died. Filming started in July 1969 at the Salem Hospital in Salem, Massachusetts. Filming continued until September 1969 in Massachusetts, including Hammond museum, also Naples, Florida and the following California locations: Sequoia National Park, Santa Monica Pier and the Kona Kai Club on Shelter Island, San Diego.

The scene in the cemetery where Minnelli appeared nude was filmed at the Blue Hills Cemetery in Braintree, Massachusetts and resulted in a misdemeanor complaint from family members of those buried there. A "Liza Minnelli Bill" was introduced in Massachusetts the following year with a six-month prison sentence and $1,000 fine for anyone shooting in cemeteries without permission.

The film was the debut of Ken Howard and Robert Moore and the first credited role for Wayne Tippit.

== Release ==
The film premiered at the Cannes Film Festival on May 10, 1970, and opened at the Beekman Theatre in New York City on July 1.

Olive Films announced that it would release Tell Me That You Love Me, Junie Moon on DVD and Blu-ray for the first time on August 16, 2016.

== Reception and legacy ==
Unlike Minnelli's previous film, 1969's The Sterile Cuckoo, which was successful artistically and financially, as well as netting Minnelli an Oscar nomination as Best Actress, Tell Me That You Love Me, Junie Moon was a disappointment to most critics and a financial failure at the box office. Roger Ebert was one of the few critics who did not dislike the film and particularly praised the performances of Minnelli, Coco and Moore.

Ebert summed up his review:

The ending is not convincing, alas; we're never quite sure what happened to the Howard character, or why. And surely in 1970 people don't make tender speeches and then die on cue in their lover's arms. But, on balance, the movie works and tells us something about three or four good people who are trying to cope. That's enough.

== Awards ==
Otto Preminger was nominated for the Golden Palm at the 1970 Cannes Film Festival.

== See also ==
- List of American films of 1970
