= Ghost Fever =

- Theatrical release poster
- Directed by: Lee Madden (Note: Credited as Alan Smithee.)
- Screenplay by: Oscar Brodney
- Produced by: Edward Coe; Poemandres Rich; Ron Rich
- Starring: Sherman Hemsley; Luis Ávalos; Jennifer Rhodes; Deborah Benson; Diana Brookes; Myron Healey
- Edited by: James Ruxin; Earl Watson
- Music by: James Hart
- Production company: Infinite Productions
- Distributed by: Miramax Films
- Release date: March 27, 1987
- Running time: 86 minutes
- Countries: United States; Mexico
- Language: English
- Budget: $2.5-5 million

Ghost Fever is a 1987 horror comedy film, directed by Lee Madden and written by Oscar Brodney. The film stars Sherman Hemsley, Luis Ávalos, Jennifer Rhodes, Deborah Benson, Diana Brookes and Myron Healey. The film was released on March 27, 1987, by Miramax Films.

It is an international co-production between the United States and Mexico. The plot concerns detectives Buford and Benny being sent to a haunted house. During the night they spend there, the duo encounter ghosts, vampires and zombies.

== Plot ==
Buford and Benny are two Greendale County, Georgia police officers sent to serve an eviction notice for an historic plantation. Two ghosts named Andrew Lee, a former owner of the plantation, and Jethro, a former slave, decide to prevent their old home from being foreclosed upon.

While the two officers explore the mansion, Buford discovers a hidden laboratory that was formerly used to experiment upon and torture the plantation slaves. Aggressive supernatural events begin occurring, but Lee and Jethro are confused because they are not responsible for these dangerous acts.

Buford and Benny then find the home's residents: two pretty sisters named Linda and Lisa. The ladies explain that they believe their racist dead grandfather is the aggressive ghost. They introduce the men to Madame St. Esprit, a spiritual medium who has been called upon to hold a séance. This leads to a supernatural attack involving lightning-like spirit energy.

During the evening and into the night, more ghostly mischief occurs. Jethro comes to realize that the slaves placed a voodoo curse upon their master and turned him into an immortal vampire. The vampire appears and the officers begin encountering zombies on the plantation grounds. Benny manages to kill the vampire by staking him through the heart.

Linda and Lisa reveal that they have been dead for many years and are tied to their house. To save the old plantation, Benny wins a boxing match (with a little help from Lee and Jethro) and uses the prize money to keep the home from going into foreclosure.

As Buford and Benny drive on a rural road at the night, Lee and Jethro kill the officers in a car crash. The ghosts of Buford and Benny happily return to the plantation to spend the after life with Linda and Lisa.

== Cast ==
- Sherman Hemsley as Buford Washington / Jethro
- Luis Ávalos as Benny Alvarez
- Jennifer Rhodes as Madame St. Esprit
- Deborah Benson as Linda
- Diana Brookes as Lisa
- Myron Healey as Andrew Lee
- Joe Frazier as Terrible Tucker
- Pepper Martin as Sheriff Clay/Beauregard Lee
- Kenneth Johnston as Terrible Tucker's Manager
- Roger Cudney as TV Announcer
- Patrick Welch as Ring Announcer
- Steve Stone as Reporter
- Ramón Berumen as Referee
- George Palmiero as Terrible Tucker's Trainer

== Reception ==
Leonard Klady of the Los Angeles Times reviewed the film during its initial theatrical release in 1987. He declared the film to be "frighteningly bad," and noted "there's chemistry between actors Hemsley and Avalos but it's far from being of the sure-fire variety."
