= Angel Unchained =

1970 film

- Theatrical release poster
- Directed by: Lee Madden
- Screenplay by: Jeffrey Alan Fiskin
- Produced by: American International Pictures
- Starring: Don Stroud; Luke Askew; Larry Bishop; Tyne Daly; Aldo Ray
- Cinematography: Irving Lippman
- Edited by: Fred R. Feitshans Jr.
- Music by: Randy Sparks
- Distributed by: American International Pictures
- Release date: September 2, 1970
- Running time: 87 minutes
- Country: United States
- Language: English

Angel Unchained (also known as Hell's Angels Unchained) is a 1970 American action thriller film directed by Lee Madden for American International Pictures and starring Don Stroud as the title character Angel. It was released in the United States on September 2, 1970.

== Plot ==
Following a biker brawl involving the Exiles MC (Nomad Chapter), their leader, Angel (Don Stroud) quits in pursuit of a new life. He meets Merilee (Tyne Daly), who was harassed by local men who despise hippies. She introduces him to her commune and their leader, Jonathan Tremaine, who is running from the anti-hippie townsfolk. Angel is quick to fall in love with Merilee, but the commune is under regular harassment. When the situation becomes too tough to handle, Angel is forced to ask the Exiles MC to help out the hippies.

== Cast ==
- Don Stroud as Angel
- Tyne Daly as Merilee
- Luke Askew as Jonathan Tremaine
- Larry Bishop as Pilot
- Aldo Ray as Sheriff
- T. Max Graham as Magician

== Production ==
Also known as Hell's Angels Unchained, Angel Unchained was directed by Lee Madden, written by Jeffrey Alan Fiskin, and produced by American International Pictures. The film was shot in and around Phoenix and Lehi Arizona. Members of the real-life Dirty Dozen MC were recruited for the film. Angel Unchained marked the film debut of T. Max Graham, who played Magician.

== Release ==
The film had its United States premiere in August 1970, before being theatrically released nationwide on September 2, 1970. Until December 1971, there were still screenings of Angel Unchained in Gadsden, Alabama. A soundtrack recording was released in 1970 on American International Records featuring music composed and sung by Randy Sparks.

=== Reception ===
A reviewer of The Nevada Daily Mail considered the film to be an unsuccessful attempt to combine elements of both The Wild Angels and Easy Rider. Although offering that the film was not quite meaningful, he found it to be a "fair motorcycle picture".

== See also ==
- List of American films of 1970
- List of films related to the hippie subculture
