= Marjorie Kellogg =

American author (1922–2005)

Marjorie Kellogg (July 17, 1922 – December 19, 2005) was an American author.

== Biography ==
Marjorie Kellogg was born in Santa Barbara, California, July 17, 1922.

Kellogg attended and dropped out of the University of California, Berkeley before going to San Francisco to pursue a career in writing. She worked at the San Francisco Chronicle as a copy editor.

She later received a job with Salute Magazine, where she was sent to write about the aftermath of World War II in France and Spain. When she returned to the United States, Kellogg earned a master's degree in social work at Smith College.

She relocated to New York City, where she worked in various agencies as a social worker, which she credited as her inspiration for the characters in her books, plays and films.

In 1968, Kellogg published Tell Me That You Love Me, Junie Moon, her first novel and most famous work, and two years later, she wrote the screenplay for the film adaptation. The movie was directed by Otto Preminger and starred Liza Minnelli. She later wrote a screenplay adaptation of Sylvia Plath's novel The Bell Jar. Her second novel was Like the Lion's Tooth, which was about three emotionally distraught children. Carl Williams directed The Oldest Trick in the World, which was Kellogg's first work as a playwright.

She later followed with The Smile of the Cardboard Man and After You've Gone, both of which starred Sylvia Short, who became her lover. Kellogg wrote the book for a musical Skybound, produced by the ASCAP workshop. In 1989, she returned to Santa Barbara with Sylvia Short to live.

Kellogg died from complications of Alzheimer's disease in 2005, aged 83, at her home in Santa Barbara.
