= Jesse Hill Ford =

American journalist

- Born: December 28, 1928; Troy, Alabama
- Died: June 1, 1996 (aged 67)
- Occupation: Writer
- Writing career
- Genre: Southern literature

Jesse Hill Ford (December 28, 1928 – June 1, 1996) was an American writer of Southern literature, best known for his critical and commercial success in short fiction as well as the novels Mountains of Gilead and The Liberation of Lord Byron Jones.

== Biography ==
He was born in Troy, Alabama on December 28, 1928. Ford was raised in Nashville, Tennessee. He attended Montgomery Bell Academy and received his Bachelor of Arts from Vanderbilt University. His education was interrupted by the Korean War, during which he served in the United States Navy. Following his discharge, he enrolled in the University of Florida, where he received a Master of Arts in 1955. After graduation he worked as a public relations director, but in 1957 he decided to devote himself to writing on a full-time basis. He and his family moved to Humboldt, Tennessee. Two years later, he won an Atlantic Monthly prize for the short story "The Surest Thing in Show Business". In 1961, he spent a year at the University of Oslo as a Fulbright Scholar and published his first novel, Mountains of Gilead, and in 1964 he wrote both the teleplay and theatrical scripts of The Conversion of Buster Drumwright.

One year later, Ford published The Liberation of Lord Byron Jones, which was selected by the Book of the Month Club. A critical and commercial success, it earned him a Guggenheim Fellowship for fiction writing, and was later adapted by Ford and Stirling Silliphant for a 1970 feature film directed by William Wyler. Other works by Ford include Fishes, Birds, and Sons of Men, a compilation of his early short stories; The Feast of Saint Barnabas, which focused on a Florida race riot; and The Raider, a historical novel set in Tennessee before and during the American Civil War.

In 1971, Ford shot a black soldier, PVT. George Henry Doaks Jr., 19, he believed was a threat to his 17-year-old son when he saw Doaks' car parked on his private driveway. Coincidentally, the man's female companion was a relative of the woman who had served as the basis for The Liberation of Lord Byron Jones. He also contributed guest columns to USA Today in 1989 and 1990 after changing from politically liberal to conservative.

He was initially indicted on a charge of first degree murder by a Gibson County Grand Jury and released on $20,000 bond at the preliminary hearing.

He eventually returned to Nashville where, severely depressed following open-heart surgery and the publication of his collected letters, he died by suicide on June 1, 1996.

== Bibliography ==
=== Novels ===
- Mountains of Gilead (1961)
- The Liberation of Lord Byron Jones (1965)
- The Feast of Saint Barnabas (1969)
- The Raider (1975)

=== Short fiction ===
- Fishes, Birds and Sons of Men (1967)

=== Other ===
- The Conversion of Buster Drumwright (play, 1964)
- Mister Potter and His Bank (1977)

=== Stories ===
Title	Publication	Collected in
"The Surest Thing in Show Business"	The Atlantic (April 1959)	Fishes, Birds and Sons of Men
"A Strange Sky"	The Atlantic (September 1959)	Fishes, Birds and Sons of Men
"How the Mountains Are"	The Atlantic (April 1960)	Fishes, Birds and Sons of Men
"Beyond the Sunset" aka "Safe at Last"	The Atlantic (October 1960)	Fishes, Birds and Sons of Men
"The Trout"	The Atlantic (July 1961)	Fishes, Birds and Sons of Men
"The Cow" aka "Foxy"	The Atlantic (December 1962)	Fishes, Birds and Sons of Men
"Fishes, Birds and Sons of Men"	The Atlantic (April 1963)	Fishes, Birds and Sons of Men
"The Cave"	The Atlantic (December 1963)	Fishes, Birds and Sons of Men
"The Trial"	The Atlantic (April 1964)	-
"Look Down, Look Down"	The Atlantic (June 1964)	Fishes, Birds and Sons of Men
"To the Open Water"	The Atlantic (November 1964)	Fishes, Birds and Sons of Men
"The Messenger"	The Atlantic (July 1965)	Fishes, Birds and Sons of Men
"Monday Morning, Mazatlan"	Shenandoah (Autumn 1965)	-
"The Britches Thief"	The Atlantic (November 1965)	Fishes, Birds and Sons of Men
"The Bitter Bread"	The Reporter (February 24, 1966)	Fishes, Birds and Sons of Men
"Whenever I Left Carver Hill"	The Delta Review (Spring 1966)	-
"Duplicate Monday Nights"	The Georgia Review (Spring 1966)	-
"Wild Honey" aka "The Bee Tree"	The Atlantic (April 1966)	Fishes, Birds and Sons of Men
"The Highwayman"	The Paris Review 10 (Summer 1966)	Fishes, Birds and Sons of Men
"Act of Self-Defense"	The Atlantic (April 1967)	Fishes, Birds and Sons of Men
"The Savage Sound"	The Atlantic (July 1967)	Fishes, Birds and Sons of Men
"Winterkill"	Esquire (September 1967)	Fishes, Birds and Sons of Men
"The Rabbit"	The Delta Review (October 1967)	Fishes, Birds and Sons of Men
"Gudliev"	The Delta Review (January 1968)	-
"The Collector"	The Atlantic (February 1968)	-
"The Doctor"	The Atlantic (January 1969)	-
"Destruction"	Esquire (July 1969)	-
"The Debt"	The Atlantic (June 1972)	-
"Big Boy"	The Atlantic (January 1974)	-
"The Jail"	Playboy (March 1975)	-
