= Lee Madden =

American film director (1927–2009)

Lee Madden (born Leon Blank, March 6, 1927 – April 9, 2009) was an American film and television director.

He is known for directing the biker film, Hell's Angels '69, starring the original Oakland Hell's Angels. His other films include another biker film, Angel Unchained, The Night God Screamed, Ghost Fever (credited as Alan Smithee), and The Manhandlers. He also directed episodes of The Most Deadly Game, Bearcats!, Cade's County and The New Perry Mason.

He was born in Brooklyn, New York.

His company, Lee Madden Associates, created many industrial films and television commercials for mostly automobile companies, including the 1967 film, 1999 AD.

He died from complications of pneumonia on April 9, 2009, in Camarillo, California. He was married to Geraldine Gunn until his death. She died about a year later. His son, David Madden, is President of Berlanti Productions.
