= T. Max Graham =

American actor

- Born: Neil Graham Moran; September 2, 1941; Kansas City, Missouri, United States
- Died: October 27, 2011 (aged 70); Kansas City, Missouri, United States
- Occupation: Actor
- Years active: 1970-2009

Neil Graham Moran (September 2, 1941 – October 27, 2011), known professionally as T. Max Graham, was an American actor. He played the owner of the pencil factory in David Lynch's film Eraserhead.

== Selected filmography ==
- Angel Unchained (1970) - Magician
- Eraserhead (1977) - The Boss
- Gypsy Angels (1980) - Sergeant
- The Sting II (1983) - Tom (The Bartender)
- Kansas (1988) - Mr. Kennedy
- The Burden of Proof (1992, TV Movie) - Lt. Ray Radczyk
- Article 99 (1992) - Captain
- I Can Make You Love Me (1993, TV Movie) - Captain Olson
- Dark Summer (1994) - Timekeeper / Seconds / Refs
- My Antonia (1995, TV Movie) - Mr. Harling
- Ride with the Devil (1999) - Reverend Wright
- More than Puppy Love (2002) - Track Coach
- Silence (2002) - County Sheriff
- Bunker Hill (2008) - Mayor Tompkins
- Bonnie & Clyde vs. Dracula (2008) - Jake
- The Only Good Indian (2009) - Finkle
