= Anna (1967 film) =

1967 film

- Written by: Serge Gainsbourg; Jean-Loup Dabadie
- Directed by: Pierre Koralnik
- Starring: Anna Karina
- Country of origin: France
- Original language: French

Production
- Producer: Michèle Arnaud
- Cinematography: Willy Kurant
- Editor: Françoise Collin
- Running time: 87 minutes

Original release
- Release: 13 January 1967

Anna is a 1967 French musical-comedy film directed by Pierre Koralnik and starring Anna Karina.

== Cast ==
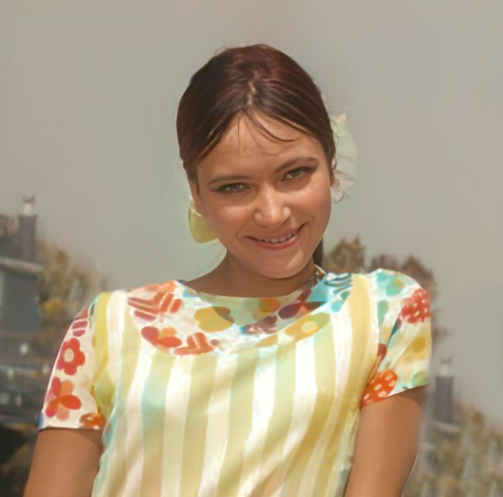
Anna Karina

- Anna Karina as Anna
- Jean-Claude Brialy as Serge (as J.C. Brialy)
- Marianne Faithfull as a young woman at the evening dance
- Serge Gainsbourg as Serge's friend
- Barbara Sommers as an aunt of Serge's
- Isabelle Felder as an aunt of Serge's
- Henri Virlojeux as banker
- Hubert Deschamps as TV host
