= The Party at Kitty and Stud's =

1970 American softcore pornographic romance film

- Theatrical release poster
- Directed by: Morton Lewis
- Written by: Morton Lewis
- Produced by: Morton Lewis
- Starring: Sylvester Stallone; Henrietta Holm
- Distributed by: Cinema Epoch; Italian Stallion Productions
- Release date: February 10, 1970 (United States)
- Running time: 71 minutes
- Country: United States
- Language: English
- Budget: $5,000

The Party at Kitty and Stud's (Note: Contemporary newspaper listings give the film's full title as The Party at Kitty and Stud's Place.) is a 1970 American softcore pornographic romance film directed, written and produced by Morton Lewis and starring Sylvester Stallone in his first starring and leading role. Stallone worked two days and was paid $200. Shortly after the 1976 release of Rocky, The Party at Kitty and Stud's was edited and re-released as Italian Stallion to capitalize on its now-famous star.

== Plot ==
The film deals with the sex life of a young New York City woman, Kitty, and her boyfriend, Stud. Stud is brutal and oafish, but Kitty is enamored with his sexual performance. They sometimes engage in light sadomasochism, with Stud belt-whipping Kitty. Stud later posts a sign on a bulletin board inviting people to a party. Several people show up at Kitty and Stud's apartment and they engage in group sex, with Stud servicing all the women.

== Cast ==
- Sylvester Stallone as Stud
- Henrietta Holm as Kitty
- Jodi Van Prang as Jodi
- Nicholas Warren as Nick
- Frank Micelli as Frank
- Barbara Strom as Barb
- Janet Banzet as Girl in Park (uncredited)

== Production ==
=== Development ===
According to Stallone, the film was financed by "a group of wealthy lawyers, very, very solid." The actor said in a 1978 Playboy interview that he had done the film out of desperation after being bounced out of his apartment and finding himself homeless for several days, sleeping in a New York City bus station in the middle of winter. In Stallone's words: "It was either do that movie or rob someone because I was at the end—at the very end—of my rope. Instead of doing something desperate, I worked two days for $200 and got myself out of the bus station". The actor also called the film "horrendous" and commented "By today's standards, the movie would almost qualify for a PG rating".

== Release ==
=== Theatrical ===
Although some sources, including Stallone himself, have stated that The Party at Kitty and Stud's was never released until after his success in Rocky (1976), contemporary newspaper advertisements indicate that the film was screened in adult cinemas in at least four U.S. states between 1970 and 1972.

Stallone has stated that after Rocky became a hit, the owners of The Party at Kitty and Stud's offered to sell him the rights to the film for about US$100,000 in order to prevent its re-release, but the actor "wouldn't buy it for two bucks". The film was then rereleased in theaters under the new title The Italian Stallion. In a prologue included with the reissued version, and in the film's trailer, pornography director Gail Palmer sat by an editing machine addressing the audience and presented the film as X-rated. The release campaign implied that the original film was hardcore pornography, but that the material had now been edited into a milder version. However, the truth of this version has been repeatedly challenged, notably by trade journal AVN, which examined an original print, finding no trace of hardcore scenes. The "Sylvester Stallone porno movie" evolved over the years into a minor urban legend.

=== Home media ===
The film was released on DVD in the United States in July 2004 by Ventura Distribution, then again in October 2007 by Cinema Epoch, both under short licenses from Bryanston Distributing Company. Bryanston owned all worldwide rights to the title and also granted short overseas licenses to various territories at the time.

In 2007, the film was released on DVD in a supposedly hardcore version with the lead actor performing actual sexual penetrations. However, the hardcore scenes in that version were revealed as inserts not involving Stallone.

Scenes from The Party at Kitty and Stud's surfaced in a German version of Roger Colmont's hardcore film White Fire (1976), released on DVD under license by Another World Entertainment in 2008.

In 2009, negotiations between Bryanston and Metro-Goldwyn-Mayer for the sale of rights to the film were unsuccessful. The film's worldwide rights and original 35 mm negatives were auctioned on eBay for $412,000 in November 2010.

== Reception ==
=== Box office ===
When rereleased as Italian Stallion, the film was distributed to movie theaters for $10,000 a night, about which Stallone commented "Hell, for $10,000 forget the movie! I'll be there myself!"
