= Janet Banzet =

American actress

- Janet Banzet
- Born: Jeanette Banzet; May 17, 1934; Dallas, Texas, U.S.
- Died: July 29, 1971 (aged 37); New York City, U.S.
- Other name: Marie Brent
- Occupation: Actress
- Years active: 1961–1971

Janet Banzet (May 17, 1934 – July 29, 1971), also credited as Marie Brent and several other names, was an American actress who appeared in several sexploitation films of the late 1960s and early 1970s. She starred in several provocatively titled films directed by Michael Findlay and Joseph W. Sarno. She had a small role in the 1970 adult film The Party at Kitty and Stud's better known later under the title Italian Stallion which was Sylvester Stallone's film debut. She acted in about 40 movies.

== Death ==
Banzet died by suicide on July 29, 1971, in New York City. She is buried in Oakdale Memorial Park in Glendora, California in Los Angeles County, California.

== Filmography ==
- The Hardy Girls (1974)
- Only You Know, And I Know (1971)
- Is There Sex After Death? (1971)
- Interplay (1970)
- The Party at Kitty and Stud's (1970)
- Sexual Understanding (1970)
- The Amazing Transplant (1970)
- Tuck Me In (1970)
- The Filth Shop (1969)
- The Corporate Queen (1969)
- All Women Are Bad (1969)
- The Ultimate Degenerate (1969)
- Smoke and Flesh (1968)
- A Thousand Pleasures (1968)
- Cargo of Love (1968)
- Come Play with Me (1968)
- Private Relations (1968)
- Sugar Daddy (1968)
- The Kiss of Her Flesh (1968)
- Two Girls for a Madman (1968)
- Cool It, Baby (1967)
- To Turn a Trick (1967)
- Professor Lust (1967)
- Teach Me How to Do It! (1967)
- Miniskirt Love (1967)
- Venus in Furs (1967)
- Death of a Nymphette (1967)
- Anything for Money (1967)
- The Sex Cycle (1967)
- Diary of a Swinger (1967)
- Julie Is No Angel (1967)
- Lusting Hours (1967)
- Playpen Girls (1967)
- Teenage Gang Debs (1966)
- Skin Deep in Love (1966)
- The Beast That Killed Women (1965)
- Lilith (1964)
- Breakfast at Tiffany's (1961)
