= Pierre Koralnik =

French film director

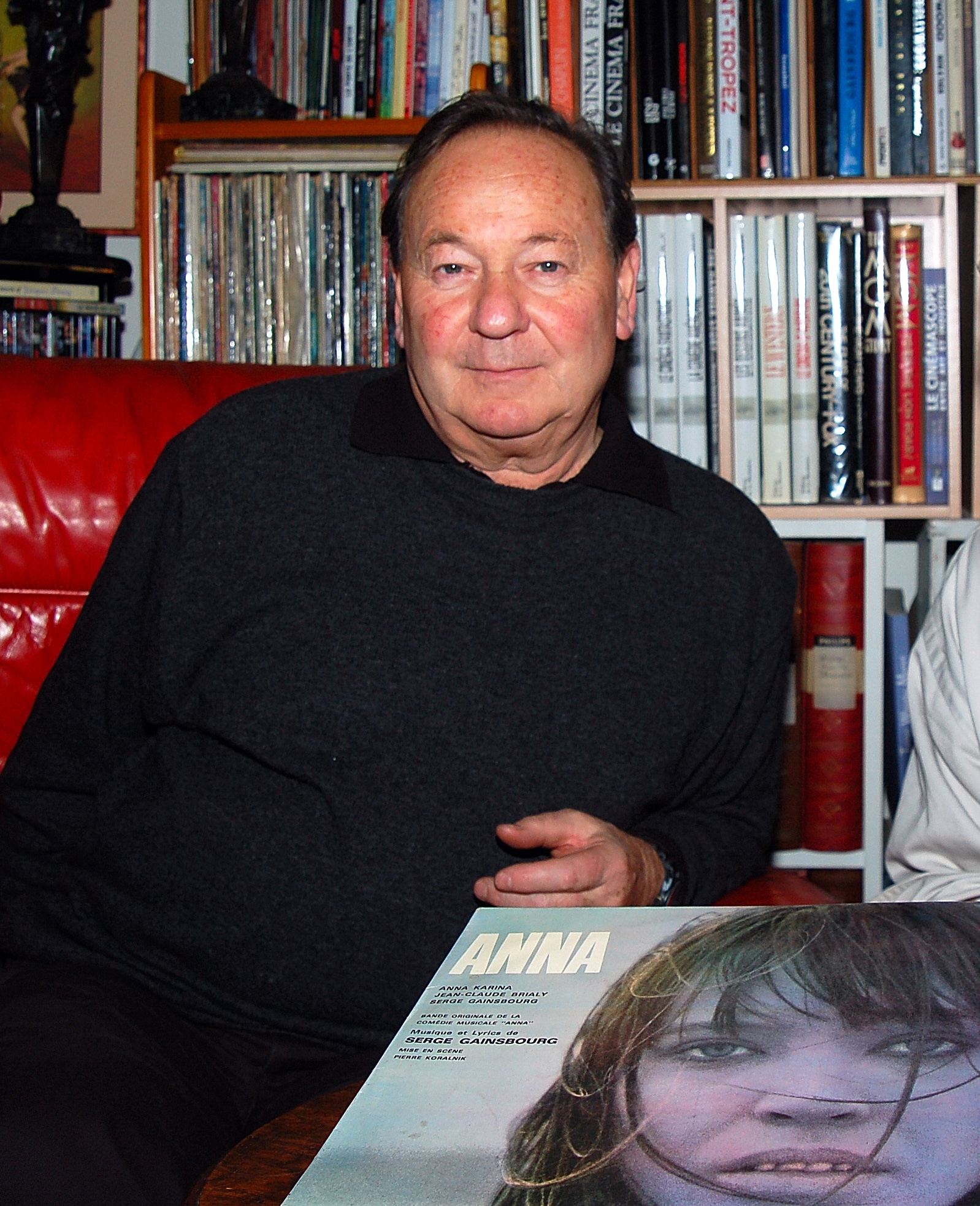
- Born: 22 December 1938 (age 87); Paris, France
- Occupations: Film director Screenwriter
- Years active: 1967-2002

Pierre Koralnik (born 22 December 1938) is a French film director and screenwriter. He directed the 1967 film Anna, which starred Anna Karina.

== Selected filmography ==
- Anna (1967)
- Cannabis (1970)
- Das letzte Versteck (2002)
