= Rix =

Rix or RIX may refer to:

== Places ==
- Rix, Jura, a commune in France
- Rix, Nièvre, a commune in France

== People ==
- Rix (surname)
- Rix Robinson (1789–1875), Michigan pioneer

== Other uses ==
- Rix, a Gaulish word meaning "king"; cognate with the ancient Gaelic word Rí, as well as the Latin Rex and the Sanskrit Rājan
- Baron Rix, a British life peerage in Whitehall
- Rix Centre, a British charitable organization
- J.R. Rix & Sons Ltd, a fuel, oil, and shipping company
- Reykjavik Internet Exchange (RIX), an Internet Exchange Point in Reykjavík, Iceland
- Riga International Airport (IATA code RIX), in Latvia

== See also ==
- Ricks (disambiguation)
- Rick (disambiguation)
- RIXS, resonant inelastic X-ray scattering
- Rixe, German bicycle/moped/motorcycle factory
