= Rix (surname) =

Rix is surname with German origins.

Notable people with the surname include:

- Brian Rix (1924–2016), English actor and charity worker
- Carl Barnett Rix (1908 – 1946), President of the Milwaukee Bar Association, President of the Wisconsin State Bar, President of the American Bar Association
- Chastina Rix (1881–1963), later known as Christine Sterling
- Chris Rix, American football quarterback, coach and sportscaster
- Donald Rix, Canadian pathologist and philanthropist
- Felice Rix (1893–1967), Austrian-born textile, wallpaper, and craft designer who lived in Japan
- Graham Rix, English football player, coach and sex offender
- Grant Rix, Australian rugby league footballer
- Hans-Walter Rix, German astronomer
- Helmut Rix (1926–2004), German linguist
- Hilda Rix Nicholas (1884–1961), née Rix, Australian artist
- Jamie Rix (born 1958), British children's author and TV producer
- Jemma Rix, Australian theatre performer
- Jonathan Rix (born 1960) British academic and author
- Louisa Rix (born 1955), British actress and interior designer
- Martyn Rix, British botanist and horticulturalist, editor of Curtis's Botanical Magazine
- Michael G. Rix, Australian arachnologist
- Olly Rix (born 1985), English actor
- Robert Rix, British founding figure of shipbuilder and shipowner J.R. Rix & Sons Ltd
- Simon Rix, bass player for British band Kaiser Chiefs
- Sönke Rix (born 1975), German politician
- Tyler Rix, English saxophonist

== See also ==
- Rix (disambiguation)
