= Ricks =

Ricks may refer to:

== People ==
- Andre Ricks (born 1996), American basketball player
- Bob Ricks (21st century), American police chief
- Christopher Ricks (born 1933), British literary critic and scholar
- Desmond Ricks, American football player
- Doug Ricks, American politician and member of the Idaho Senate
- Earl T. Ricks (1908–1954), United States Air Force general
- Eli Ricks (born 2001), American football player
- James B. Ricks (1852–1906), American jurist
- James “Pappy” Ricks (1927–2011), American basketball player
- Jerry Ricks (1940–2007), American blues guitarist
- Jim Ricks (born 1973), American and Irish visual artist
- Jimmy "Ricky" Ricks (1924–1974), founding member of the R&B group The Ravens
- Joel Ricks (1804–1888), Mormon pioneer
- Kevin Ricks (born 1960), convicted sexual predator
- Lawrence Ricks (born 1961), American football professional running back
- Mark Ricks (1924–2016), American politician
- Mark Ricks (gridiron football) (born 1970), American player of gridiron football
- Martha Ann Erskine Ricks (1817–1901), Liberian quilter
- Melissa Ricks (born 1990), Filipina actress
- Mikhael Ricks (born 1974), former National Football League tight end
- Naquetta Ricks, Liberian-American member of the Colorado House of Representatives
- Robert Ricks, American meteorologist at the National Weather Service
- Stephen D. Ricks, professor at Brigham Young University
- Thomas E. Ricks (journalist) (born 1955), American journalist
- Thomas E. Ricks (Mormon) (1828–1901), Mormon pioneer and community leader
- Tijuana Ricks (born 1978), American television actress

== Places ==
- Rick's Café Casablanca, a restaurant, bar and café in Casablanca, Morocco
- Ricks College, Rexburg, Idaho, now Brigham Young University–Idaho
- Ricks Spring, a Karst spring in Utah, USA
- Ricks Township, Christian County, Illinois, United States

== Other ==
- Porter Ricks, a fictional Park ranger from the TV show Flipper
- Rick's Café Américain, a fictional bar which is the principal set of the film Casablanca

== See also ==
- Rick (disambiguation)
- Rix (disambiguation)
