= Leo Franklyn =

English actor (1897–1975)

Franklyn in The Night We Got the Bird, 1961

Leo Franklyn (7 April 1897 – 17 September 1975) was an English actor. Much of his early career was in Edwardian musical comedy; in his later career he was chiefly associated with farce.

In the years between the First and Second World Wars, Franklyn was a well-known performer in musical comedies, appearing in both British and American shows. He spent ten years performing in Australia in musical comedies. From the 1940s he appeared regularly in pantomime as the Dame.

From the 1950s to his death he was principally associated with British farces. From 1956 to 1969 he was a member of Brian Rix's company, first at the Whitehall Theatre, and later at the Garrick.

== Life and career ==
=== Early years ===
Franklyn was born in London and educated by the Franciscan Brotherhood. He served in the army in the first years of the First World War, and made his stage debut in Sunderland in August 1916 in the chorus of The Belle of New York. When the production opened in London in December 1916, Franklyn made his West End debut. He toured for three years in Julian Wylie's musical comedy companies.

In the West End, Franklyn appeared with Lupino Lane in Turned Up. The Times commented, "Mr. Leo Franklyn … shows a pretty sense of humour. He can also dance." In 1923, Franklyn undertook a tour of the northern provinces, appearing in Scotland in the musical comedy Kissing Time in which he played Bibi St. Po. In the late 1920s he went to Australia for more than ten years, appearing in shows such as The Duchess of Dantzic, Gay Divorce, The Girl Friend, Music in the Air, Our Miss Gibbs and The Quaker Girl.

Returning to London, Franklyn got his break when the comedian Laddie Cliff fell terminally ill, and Franklyn was cast as the comic lead in a new musical comedy, Crazy Days, as James J. Hooker. The Times praised his performance: "a lively, unrepetitive comedian, quick off the mark, and secure of his audience." In 1938 he played in pantomime as Dame Crusoe in Robinson Crusoe at the Duke of York's Theatre. During the Second World War he performed for ENSA, entertaining the troops and appeared in A Waltz Dream (1942) alongside Nita Croft and Leslie Hatton.

In 1943 he played Nisch (Njegus in the original) in The Merry Widow at His Majesty's Theatre. The Manchester Guardian reported that he "flits through the whole affair as a somewhat disillusioned Puck of deft and considerable distinction." His last musical comedy was The Lilac Domino at the Adelphi Theatre in the role of Prosper in 1944. He appeared as pantomime dames in various English cities, and in 1956 he joined the Brian Rix company, in which he achieved his widest fame, in Whitehall farce.

=== Farceur ===
For Rix, Franklyn succeeded John Slater as the crooked bookie Alf Tubbs in the farce Dry Rot. He remained with Rix for thirteen years in knowing, worldly roles contrasting with Rix's gauche innocents. Franklyn played George Chuffer in Simple Spymen, which ran for over three years; Jugg, the butler, in One for the Pot, which ran for 1,221 performances; and Hoskins the gardener in Chase Me, Comrade from June 1964 to May 1966. He appeared in films with Rix, including The Night We Dropped a Clanger (1959), And the Same to You (1960), Nothing Barred (1961) and The Night We Got the Bird (1961).

In 1967 Rix moved across Trafalgar Square from the Whitehall Theatre to the larger Garrick, presenting a repertory of three different farces in which he starred with Franklyn in Stand by your Bedouin, Uproar in the House, and Let Sleeping Wives Lie. They then appeared in She's Done It Again in 1969 in which Franklyn played Pop. His last Rix farce was Don't Just Lie There, Say Something! which ran from September 1971 to March 1973.

In 1975 Franklyn was playing in another farce, No Sex Please, We're British, when he suffered a heart attack, and died a week later at the age of 78. In its obituary notice The Times called him "the doyen of Whitehall farce". He was survived by his wife, the actress Mary Rigby, and their son, the actor William Franklyn.

== Selected filmography ==
- Two Minutes Silence (1933)
- Keep Fit (1937)
- I've Got a Horse (1938)
- Come On George! (1939)
- The Night We Dropped a Clanger (1959)
- And the Same to You (1960)
- The Night We Got the Bird (1961)
- Nothing Barred (1961)
