= John Chapman (screenwriter) =

British actor and playwright (1927–2001)

- Born: John Roy Chapman; 27 May 1927; Acton, England
- Died: 3 September 2001 (aged 74); Périgueux, France
- Education: Royal Academy of Dramatic Arts
- Occupations: Actor, playwright, screenwriter
- Spouse: Betty Impey (m. 1954)
- Children: 4
- Family: Edward Chapman (uncle), Paul Chapman (brother), Colin David Chapman (brother)

John Roy Chapman (27 May 1927 – 3 September 2001) was a British actor, playwright and screenwriter, known for his collaborations with Ray Cooney.

== Biography ==
=== Early life ===
Born in Acton, John Chapman was the nephew of the actor Edward Chapman; his own father was an engineer. His brother, Paul Chapman, became an actor. John Chapman trained at RADA, and made his acting debut in Enid Bagnold's National Velvet in 1946.

== Early career ==
Initially a stage manager and understudy at the Whitehall Theatre for the first two years of Reluctant Heroes, the first Whitehall farce, he subsequently spent a few years in weekly rep before returning to Brian Rix's company with his first play. Dry Rot (1954), which is about dishonest bookmakers, had a four-year run with 1,475 performances. Ray Cooney joined the cast in 1956 and first met the author at this time. Chapman followed this production with Simple Spymen (1958), which was staged 1,404 times over a three-year run.

Chapman also wrote screenplays for Rix.

== Writing and collaboration with Cooney ==
Before the production of Simple Spymen closed, Chapman and Cooney had begun their collaboration. Together they wrote Not Now, Darling (1967, which Chapman adapted for the film version), Move Over, Mrs. Markham (1968), My Giddy Aunt (1968) and There Goes the Bride (1973). Meanwhile, he also wrote extensively for television including episodes of the sitcoms Hugh and I (1962–1965) and Happy Ever After (1974–1977), both of which were BBC vehicles for Terry Scott. Fresh Fields (1984–1986), and its sequel French Fields (1988–1992) for Thames Television, featured Anton Rodgers and Julia McKenzie in the leads.

== Personal life and death ==
Chapman was married to actress Betty Impey, from Whitehall, and they had four children, Mark, Adam, Justin and Guy (who died when he was young). Chapman died from cancer at his home in Périgueux, France, on 3 September 2001, aged 74.

== Filmography ==
- Dry Rot, directed by Maurice Elvey (1956, based on the 1954 play Dry Rot)
- Not Now, Darling, directed by Ray Cooney and David Croft (1973, based on the 1967 play Not Now, Darling)
- There Goes the Bride, directed by Terry Marcel (1980, based on the 1973 play There Goes the Bride)
- Sé infiel y no mires con quién, directed by Fernando Trueba (Spain, 1985, based on the 1968 play Move Over Mrs. Markham)

=== Screenwriter ===
- The Night We Dropped a Clanger, directed by Darcy Conyers (1959)
- Nothing Barred, directed by Darcy Conyers (1961)
