= Ruick =

Ruick is a surname. Notable people with the surname include:

- Barbara Ruick (1932–1974), American actress and singer
- Melville Ruick (1898–1972), American actor, father of Barbara

== See also ==
- Rick (disambiguation)
