= Tommy Watt =

Scottish jazz bandleader (1925–2006)

Thomas Mitchell Watt (31 October 1925 – 20 May 2006) was a Scottish jazz bandleader.

Born in Glasgow to a working-class family, his father a machinist toolmaker, Watt was hired as a pianist by Carl Barriteau at the age of 17, and served in the Royal Air Force during the Second World War. He moved to London following the war, where he played with Ambrose, Harry Roy, and Ken Mackintosh. He teamed up with actor Brian Rix, whom he had met during the war, in 1955 to record a demo, which eventually led to a contract with the BBC. After making appearances behind Matt Monro, Watt was hired by Parlophone for session and arranging work. In 1956 Watt put together his first big band, which played at Quaglino's, a London restaurant. Among his sidemen were Tubby Hayes, Ronnie Ross, Jackie Armstrong, Tommy McQuater, Bert Courtley, and Phil Seamen.

Watt became one of the better-known British bandleaders of the 1950s, winning an Ivor Novello Award for the song "Overdrive" and releasing their first LP record in 1958. Watt's arrangements of Count Basie songs so impressed Basie himself that he incorporated some of Watt's changes into his own performances. After disbanding his ensemble, Watt worked with Rix on stage shows and films, including the 1961 movies The Night We Got the Bird and Nothing Barred. He led the BBC Northern Dance Orchestra and the BBC Big Band briefly in the early 1960s, but squabbles with management quickly ended this contract. In 1964 he assembled the Centre 42 Big Band, and through the end of the decade wrote for television and directed singers Tommy Cooper and Freddie Starr.

In 1970, Watt put together a new group to perform at the Dorchester Hotel in London, but was dissatisfied with the gig and disbanded the orchestra soon after. He left music, aside from occasional piano performances, and became an interior decorator.

Watt was married to journalist Romany Bain from 1962 until his death in Bristol, England in 2006, aged 80. Their son Ben Watt became famous in his own right as a member of Everything but the Girl.
