= Men of Affairs =

British TV comedy series (1973–1974)

- Genre: Sitcom
- Written by: Michael Pertwee
- Directed by: Derek Clark
- Starring: Brian Rix; Warren Mitchell; Joan Sims
- Country of origin: United Kingdom
- Original language: English
- No. of series: 1
- No. of episodes: 17

Production
- Producers: Wallace Douglas; Patrick Dromgoole
- Running time: 30 minutes
- Production company: HTV

Original release
- Network: ITV
- Release: 3 October 1973 – 23 January 1974

Men of Affairs is a British comedy television series that originally aired on ITV between 3 October 1973 and 23 January 1974. It is an adaption of the 1971 play Don't Just Lie There, Say Something, in the tradition of the Whitehall farces. It takes place in a government department in London where the cabinet minister Sir William Mainwaring-Brown (Warren Mitchell) is a frantic womaniser, leading his hard-pressed private secretary Barry Ovis (Brian Rix) to try and cover up for him. Joan Sims plays Lady Mainwaring-Brown; other actors to appear in the series include Derek Royle, Kate O'Mara, Margaret Nolan, Alexandra Bastedo, Hilary Pritchard, Moira Foot, Jacki Piper, Fred Emney, Talfryn Thomas, Richard Hearne, Ambrosine Phillpotts, Francis De Wolff, Ferdy Mayne, Victor Maddern, Lynda Baron, Mollie Sugden, Alfie Bass and Bernard Bresslaw.

A film, Don't Just Lie There, Say Something!, based on the play was released in 1974, featuring Rix and Sims along with Leslie Phillips.

== Bibliography ==
- Halliwell, Leslie. Halliwell's Film Guide. Scribner, 1989.
- Smith, Leslie. Modern British Farce: A Selective Study of British Farce from Pinero to the Present Day. Macmillan, 1989.
