= Dry Rot (film) =

1956 British film by Maurice Elvey

- Theatrical release poster
- Directed by: Maurice Elvey
- Written by: John Chapman (as John Roy Chapman)(from his play)
- Produced by: Jack Clayton
- Starring: Ronald Shiner; Brian Rix; Peggy Mount; Sid James
- Cinematography: Arthur Grant
- Edited by: Gerry Hambling
- Music by: Peter Akister; Lambert Williamson
- Production company: Remus Films
- Distributed by: Independent Film Distributors
- Release date: 31 October 1956
- Running time: 87 minutes
- Country: United Kingdom
- Language: English

Dry Rot is a 1956 British comedy film directed by Maurice Elvey, and starring Ronald Shiner, Brian Rix, Peggy Mount, and Sid James. The screenplay is by John Chapman, adapted from his 1954 Whitehall farce of the same name.

The plot concerns the practice of gambling, which was illegal in the United Kingdom at the time, other than at racecourses.

== Plot ==
Three dodgy bookies, Alf Tubbe, Flash Harry, and Fred Phipps plan to rig a horse race by kidnapping the fancied horse and its French jockey. They stay at a country house hotel near the racecourse, run by Colonel and Mrs Wagstaff, where they conceal the horse Sweet Lavender (and later the jockey) in a hidden cellar. They substitute Fred for the real jockey, expecting him to lose, but this plan backfires when he wins. A subplot sees the dimwitted Fred fall in love with the hotel chambermaid Beth. A final chase scene has the main characters on a fire engine being pursued by the police.

The title Dry Rot refers to the rotten wood on the hotel stairs, which regularly catches every character unawares.

== Cast ==
- Ronald Shiner as Alf Tubbe
- Brian Rix as Fred Phipps
- Peggy Mount as Police Sergeant Fire
- Lee Patterson as Danby
- Sid James as Flash Harry (credited as Sidney James)
- Joan Sims as Beth Barton
- Heather Sears as Susan
- Michael Shepley as Colonel Wagstaff
- Joan Haythorne as Mrs. Wagstaff
- Miles Malleson as yokel
- Christian Duvaleix as Polignac
- John Roy Chapman as Claude
- Joan Benham as blonde
- Raymond Glendenning as himself
- Fred Griffiths as bookie
- Wilfrid Brambell as tar man
- Shirley Anne Field as waitress (uncredited)

== Locations ==
The horse-racing sequences were filmed at Kempton Park Racecourse, Sunbury-on-Thames.

== Box office ==
Kinematograph Weekly said the film "scored with the 'ninepennies'."

== Critical reception ==
Brian Rix called the result "a funny film, but not, in my view, as funny as the play. I blame this partially on the director, Maurice Elvey, who insisted on having our stage director, Peter Mercier by his side giving him all the stage business. A good idea in theory but we ended up with a filmed version of the stage play, without the theatre audience laughing around to gee it along. Our producer, Jack Clayton, suddenly realised this and persuaded John Chapman to write a chase sequence for the end — this was hurriedly put in and succeeded — for then it looked like a film."

The Monthly Film Bulletin wrote: "Despite the determined efforts of cast and director, this well-worn material finally proves intractable and one is left with a theatrical farce full of simple slapstick and comic yokels. Ronald Shiner tends to overplay as the wily Alf; the remainder battle valiantly against heavy odds."

Kine Weekly said "Boisterous farcical comedy. ... The jokes contain plenty of corn, but the co-stars flog them hard and finally prove that unvarnished knockabout is no mean substitute for wit. Its riotous fire engine chase climax alone warrants the price of admission. Very good British rib-tickler."

Picturegoer wrote: "It's a dead cert that racecourse comedies need more speed than this one to romp home a winner. ... This horseplay goes at a creaking pace, mostly set in a country inn, with every tired cliché in the farce fun book working double time. ... Shiner, James and Rix gang up to get laughs – but the girls come off best. There's delightful Joan Sims, as a maid, Peggy Mount, a policewoman, and the girl with the Jean Simmons sparkle – Heather Sears, who's a real flower In the wilderness."

Picture Show wrote: "This hilarious, slapstick film of the successful stage farce tells of three unsuccessful bookies who hope to make a fortune by substituting another horse, for the favourite of a big race and backing it to lose. The comedy situations which result from this deception provide amusement and it is well acted and directed."

In British Sound Films: The Studio Years 1928–1959 David Quinlan rated the film as "mediocre", writing: "Amazingly bungled version of runaway stage farce; very slow."

The Radio Times wrote, "This tale of crooked bookies plods along more slowly than a doped horse, but there is the compensation of the polished performances of expert farceurs Ronald Shiner, Brian Rix, and Sid James."

Leslie Halliwell said: "Flat filming of a long-running theatrical farce."

Sky Movies wrote, "Heather Sears makes her screen debut, Joan Sims giggles infectiously, and the charms of Shirley Ann Field can be very briefly glimpsed as a waitress at the Three Frogs Cafe. But Peggy Mount sweeps all else before her in a relatively short, but devastating, appearance as the indomitable Sergeant Fire."
