= Romany Bain =

British journalist and showbusiness interviewer

- Born: Romany Evens; 22 March 1924; Carlisle, England
- Died: 29 March 2015 (aged 91)
- Occupations: Journalist, showbusiness interviewer
- Spouses: Richard Findlater (m. 1948; div. 1962) Tommy Watt (m. 1962; died 2006)
- Children: 5, including Roly Bain and Ben Watt
- Parent(s): George Bramwell Evens; Eunice Thomas

Romany Bain (née Evens, 22 March 1924 – 29 March 2015) was a British journalist and showbusiness interviewer. In the 1960s and 1970s, she worked as a features writer for She magazine and the Daily Mail.

Bain was born in Carlisle, England, to Eunice (née Thomas) and George Bramwell Evens. Evens was a Methodist minister who, under his pseudonym Romany, later worked for the BBC as one of the first wildlife programme presenters, with Eunice as his assistant and script editor.

From 1948 to 1962, Bain was married to the theatre critic and biographer Kenneth Bruce Findlater Bain, who used the pen-name Richard Findlater. They had four children. One of their sons became an Anglican priest-clown known as Roly Bain or "Holy Roly". She subsequently married the jazz bandleader Tommy Watt, with whom she had a son, the musician Ben Watt.
