= Simple Spymen =

Play by John Chapman

Programme cover for original production, showing Brian Rix (left) looking at the Whitehall Theatre and Leo Franklyn looking at the War Office

Simple Spymen is a farce by the English playwright John Chapman. The story concerns two street musicians who are mistakenly appointed by negligent army officers to act as bodyguards to protect a scientist from assassination by a foreign spy.

The first production of Simple Spymen was directed by Wallace Douglas and presented by Rix Theatrical Productions on 19 March 1958 at the Whitehall Theatre, London. It ran there until 29 July 1961, a total of 1,403 performances. It was third in the long-running series of Whitehall farces produced by the actor-manager Brian Rix; it followed Reluctant Heroes (1950) which had run for 1,610 performances and Dry Rot (1,475 performances from 1954).

== Cast ==
- Corporal Flight – Ray Cooney (billed as Raymond Cooney)
- Lieutenant Fosgrove – Toby Perkins
- Colonel Gray-Balding – Charles Cameron
- Mr Forster Stand – Gerald Anderson
- George Chuffer – Leo Franklyn
- Percy Pringle – Brian Rix
- Mrs Byng – Joan Sanderson
- Smogs – Larry Noble
- Miss Archdale – Merylin Roberts
- Max – Peter Allenby
- Crab – Peter Mercier
- Grobchick – Andrew Sachs

== Synopsis ==
=== Act I ===
Morning. A room in the War Office

Lieutenant Fosgrove ("about thirty and very 'Army', but not very bright") and Colonel Gray-Balding ("in his fifties, forgetful, rather short-tempered but quite harmless") have few official duties to occupy them, and are passing the time away with the Daily Telegraph crossword puzzle. They are interrupted by the unexpected intrusion of Forster Stand of MI5. ("I'm Forster Stand", "How very unfortunate for you – Oh, I see, yes, well won't you sit down".) Stand briefs them about an important matter of national security. A man called Grobchick has perfected a vital Atomic Pile Restorer, and Britain must keep him safe from assassination by foreign powers. Stand requires Gray-Balding to provide Grobchick with two bodyguards, who must be masters of disguise. The army officers are nonplussed at this request, but dare not refuse. Hearing two street musicians playing outside, Fosgrove has Corporal Flight bring them in. The musicians, George and Percy, are down at heel and highly unimpressive in appearance. Fosgrove passes them off to Stand as the two designated bodyguards, brilliantly disguised.

To their horror, George and Percy are told that they must undertake a dangerous mission for their country. They are too frightened by authority to refuse and are mesmerised by the large bundle of banknotes Stand gives them for expenses. They are dispatched to collect Grobchick from his ship when it arrives in Dover from Turkey. Stand decides that they must pose as French waiters at the hotel in Dover where Grobchick will be staying. ("A disguise … perhaps a thin moustache on the top lip and a pointed beard on the bottom".) George and Percy leave for Dover.

=== Act II ===
Seven hours later. The lounge of the Haven Hotel, Dover

George and Percy bluff their way onto the staff of the hotel. Among the guests is Max, an international spy. He tells his henchman Crab that he and his assistants must eliminate any agents the British government might send. George makes Percy disguise himself as Grobchick. Max, fooled, offers Percy £30,000 for his invention. The real Grobchick arrives. George and Percy help him hide. The War Office team arrives, and George and Percy panic, fearing the wrath of MI5 for their failure to neutralise Max. Percy hides up the chimney but slips down it and sets fire to his trousers. George, now disguised as a clergyman, rapidly whisks him off.

=== Act III ===
Scene 1 – The same. After supper

Gray-Balding and Fosgrove disguise themselves and engage Grobchick in conversation. George and Percy discover that Grobchick has given the details of his invention to the hotel's head waiter for safe keeping. They retrieve them. Max, again mistaking Percy for Grobchick, demands the details of the Atomic Pile Restorer and tells them he has the hotel surrounded. Recognising Percy, Gray-Balding and Fosgrove pursue him offstage.

Scene 2 – The same. A few minutes later

In the confusion Fosgrove has knocked out Forster Stand. To cover up the error Gray-Balding and Fosgrove put Stand's unconscious body in a cupboard. He recovers and threatens them with court martial for their incompetence. After further impersonations and misdirected but harmless gunfire it emerges that Grobchick's Atomic Pile Restorer is a carpet shampoo. Gray-Balding and Fosgrove turn Stand's accusation of incompetence back on him, while George and Percy make their escape.

== Critical reception ==
The critics of the 1950s did not pay a great deal of attention to farce. Reviewing Simple Spymen, The Times said that the play "may be austerely described as rubbish", but conceded that it was skilfully constructed, and well performed. "Nothing daunts Mr. Leo Franklyn. He gets fun out of everything". Rix was praised for "an evening of good, versatile clowning". In The Manchester Guardian, Philip Hope-Wallace declared the play to be better than its predecessor, Dry Rot, and said, "Wallace Douglas produces this loud, cheerful, vulgar thing very competently. Mr Franklyn's professional skill is unfailing." In The Daily Express, John Barber wrote that he hardly laughed at all "yet all round me people choked with mirth". In The Daily Mirror, Chris Reynolds wrote, "It is a success spelt with a capital S. The audience started to laugh as soon as the curtain went up. They were still laughing as they left the theatre."

Reviewing a revival of the play in 1980, Michael Coveney wrote of the Whitehall farces, "A tradition of critical snobbery has grown up around these plays, partly because they were so blatantly popular but chiefly because of our conviction that farce, unless written by a Frenchman, is an inferior theatrical species. … Once the National Theatre has done its duty by Priestley and Rattigan and others teetering on the brink of theatrical respectability I suggest they employ Mr. Rix … to investigate the ignored riches of English farce between Travers and Ayckbourn."
