= Irene Handl =

British character actress (1901–1987)

- Handl in the 1966 BBC TV comedy Mum's Boys
- Born: 27 December 1901; Maida Vale, London, England
- Died: 29 November 1987 (aged 85); Kensington, London, England
- Resting place: Golders Green Crematorium, London, England
- Occupation: Actress
- Years active: 1937–1987

Irene Handl (eye-REE-nee) (27 December 1901 – 29 November 1987) was a British character actress and novelist who appeared in more than 100 British films.

== Life ==
Irene Handl was born in Maida Vale, London, the younger of two daughters of an Austrian-born father—Friedrich (later Frederick) Handl (1874–1961) and German mother, Marie (née Schiepp or Schuepp; 1875 – before 1924). Both of Handl's parents became naturalised British citizens. Her father came to England via Switzerland and started as a bank clerk, before becoming a stockbroker, then became a private banker. He was also said to be a descendant of the famous composer George Frideric Handel; however, there appears to be no proof of this. The Handls lived a comfortable middle-class life, with a German cook and housekeeper living in the family home.

From 1907 to 1915, Handl attended the Paddington and Maida Vale High School. In the 1920s Handl travelled several times to New York with her father, with the ship's log listing her on each occasion as having no occupation and residing in the family home.

Handl studied at an acting school run by a sister of Dame Sybil Thorndike, and then made her stage debut in London in February 1937, at the relatively advanced age of 36. This delay in her pursuance of acting was primarily because she had to take care of her father who was sick for many years.

In 1939, and by now an actress, she was living with her widower father in London. She continued to live with her father until his death in 1961. He was briefly married to the psychiatrist Ida Hirschmann (later Macalpine) for citizenship purposes.

Handl appeared in supporting roles in more than 100 British films, mostly comedy character parts such as slightly eccentric mothers, grannies, landladies and servants. She was a passionate lover of rock and roll, especially the work of Elvis Presley, and was president of the Lewisham branch of the Elvis Presley fan club. She was also a fellow of the Royal Geographical Society, and one of Britain's most avid champions of Chihuahuas, being inseparable from the pair that she owned. She also owned a Pomeranian.

== Career ==
=== Films ===
Handl had minor roles in such landmark films as Night Train to Munich and Brief Encounter. Her other notable roles included the wife of the union activist Fred Kite (played by Peter Sellers) in I'm All Right Jack (1959); Mrs Gammon, the formidable cook, opposite Gordon Harker in Small Hotel (1957); Tony Hancock's landlady in The Rebel (1961); Sherlock Holmes's landlady, Mrs Hudson, in The Private Life of Sherlock Holmes (1970); and Morgan's Communist mother, Mrs Delt, in Morgan – A Suitable Case for Treatment (1966). She also had small roles in two of the Carry On films, Carry On Nurse and Carry On Constable, and played Miss Peach in the original version of The Italian Job. She worked until 1987, the year of her death. Her last role was released posthumously the following year.

=== Theatre ===
- Goodnight Mrs Puffin
- Move Over Mrs Markham
- Cry Liberty
- The Importance of Being Earnest

Among her many later appearances on stage, she played Lady Bracknell in The Importance of Being Earnest in 1975, in a production directed by Jonathan Miller.

=== Television ===
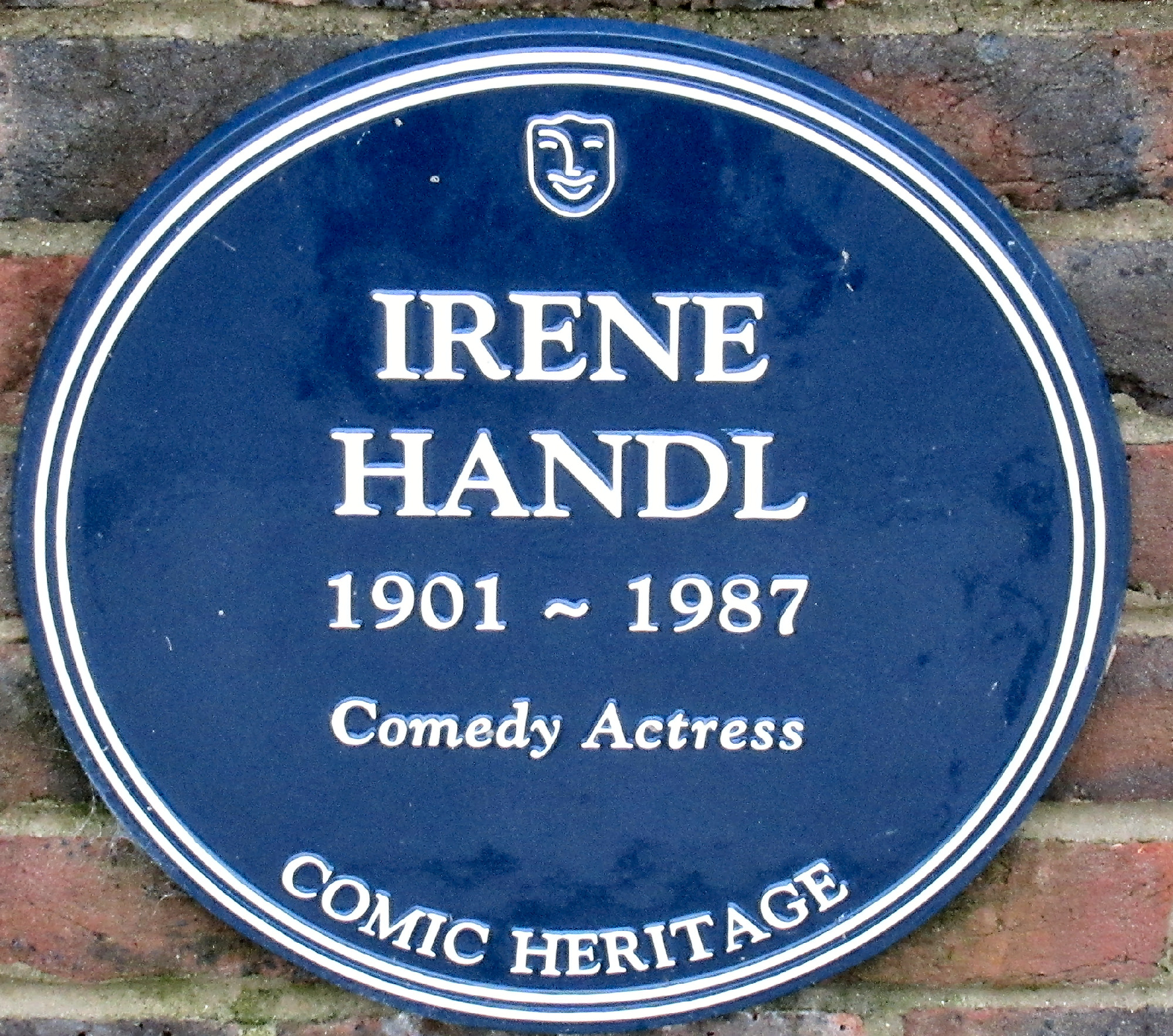
Comic Heritage plaque, Teddington

On television, she appeared in an episode of Strange Experiences and as a guest in a number of comedy series, notably as a regular in Educating Archie and as the Cockney widow Ada Cresswell in For the Love of Ada, which was later adapted for the cinema. She also advertised Horniman's tea. In 1969 she starred in the series World in Ferment as Madame Astoria. She also appeared in Maggie and Her (1978) opposite Julia McKenzie. In the early 1980s she played Gran in the ITV children's comedy show Metal Mickey. She appeared in a rare aristocratic role as the Duchess of Sheffield in Mapp and Lucia and as another aristocratic character in Eric Sykes's television film It's Your Move (1982), in which her chauffeur was played by Brian Murphy. She also appeared as Madame de Bonneuil in the BBC's TV film Hotel du Lac in 1986. She appeared in Super Gran as the magician The Great Ronaldo and as Tim Wylton's mother in Clinging Ivy (1985). Her last appearance was in the BBC sitcom In Sickness and in Health in 1987, just before her death at the age of 85.

== Novels ==
In addition to acting, she wrote two novels: The Sioux (1965), described by Margaret Drabble as "strange and unforgettable ... Highly original and oddly haunting"; and its sequel, The Gold Tip Pfitzer, (a type of Juniper, associated with mourning), (1966). The Sioux was reprinted as Green and Purple Dream (1973). She began writing what became The Sioux when she was living in Paris at the age of 19, put it aside, and did not start to write again until 1961.

== Death ==
Handl died in her flat in Kensington, west London, on 29 November 1987, aged 85, reportedly from cancer. She never married. She was cremated at Golders Green Crematorium, north London.

== Selected filmography ==
- Missing, Believed Married (1937) as Chambermaid
- Strange Boarders (1938) as Mrs Dewar
- The Terror (1938) as Kitchen Maid (uncredited)
- Inspector Hornleigh on Holiday (1939) as Boarder (uncredited)
- On the Night of the Fire (1939) as Kitchen Maid (uncredited)
- Mrs. Pym of Scotland Yard (1940) as the Medium
- Dr. O'Dowd (1940) as Sarah
- The Girl in the News (1940) as Gertrude Mary Blaker
- Night Train to Munich (1940) as Station Master (uncredited)
- George and Margaret (1940) as Beer
- Mr. Proudfoot Shows a Light (1941) as Councillor
- Gasbags (1941) as Burgomaster's wife
- Spellbound (1941) (AKA ' Passing Clouds '. Released as ' The Spell of Amy Nugent ', in USA) as Mrs. Nugent
- "Pimpernel" Smith (1941) in an uncredited bit part
- Partners in Crime as Mrs Wilson
- Uncensored (1942) as Frau von Koerner
- Get Cracking (1943) as Maggie Turner (uncredited)
- I'll Walk Beside You (1943) as Ma Perkins
- The Flemish Farm (1943) as Frau
- Dear Octopus (1943) as Flora
- Millions Like Us (1943) as Landlady (uncredited)
- Rhythm Serenade (1943) as Mrs Crumbling
- It's in the Bag (1944) as Mrs Beam
- Welcome, Mr. Washington (1944) as Mrs Pidgeon (uncredited)
- English Without Tears (1944) (uncredited)
- Give Us the Moon (1944) as Miss Haddock
- Mr. Emmanuel (1944) as Trude
- Medal for the General (1944) as Mrs Farnsworth
- One Exciting Night (1944)
- Kiss the Bride Goodbye (1945) as Mrs Victory
- For You Alone (1945) as Miss Trotter
- Great Day (1945) as Lady serving tea at a tea stall
- Brief Encounter (1945) as cellist and organist (uncredited)
- I'll Turn to You (1946) as Mrs Gammon
- Temptation Harbour (1947) as Mrs Gowshall
- Code of Scotland Yard (1947) as Ruby Towser
- The Hills of Donegal (1947) as Mrs Mactavish
- Woman Hater (1948) as Mrs Fletcher
- The Fool and the Princess (1949) as Lady on left
- Silent Dust (1949) as Cook
- The History of Mr Polly (1949) as Lady on left
- Cardboard Cavalier (1949) as the ghost of Lady Agnes
- For Them That Trespass (1949) as Inn Proprietress
- The Perfect Woman (1949) as Mrs Butters
- Dark Secret (1949) as "Woody" Woodman
- Adam and Evelyne (1949) as Mrs Crouch – Manageress (uncredited)
- Stage Fright (1950) as Mrs Mason – Gill's Maid (uncredited)
- One Wild Oat (1951) as Emily Pepys (Audrey Cuttle #2)
- Young Wives' Tale (1951) as Nanny
- Treasure Hunt (1952) as Nanny
- Top Secret (1952) as Mrs Tidmarsh
- Meet Mr. Lucifer (1953) as Lady with the Dog
- The Wedding of Lilli Marlene (1953) as Daisy
- Stryker of the Yard (1953)
- The Weak and the Wicked (1954) as Waitress
- Duel in the Jungle (1954) as Mary Taylor (uncredited)
- The Belles of St. Trinian's (1954) as Miss Gale
- Mad About Men (1954) as Mme Blanche
- Burnt Evidence (1954) as Mrs Raymond
- A Kid for Two Farthings (1955) as Mrs Abramowitz
- Now and Forever (1956) as Middle-Aged Woman (uncredited)
- Who Done It? (1956) as Customer (uncredited)
- It's Never Too Late (1956) as New Neighbour
- The Silken Affair (1956) as Receptionist
- Brothers in Law (1957) as Mrs Potter
- Small Hotel (1957) as Mrs Gammon
- Happy Is the Bride (1957) as Mme Edna
- Law and Disorder (1958) as Woman
- The Key (1958) as Clerk
- Dial 999 (TV series), ('The Big Fish', episode) – (1958) as Mrs. Rigby (uncredited)
- Next to No Time (1958) as Mrs Crowley, Greengrocer
- Carlton-Browne of the F.O. (1959) as Mrs Carter
- Carry On Nurse (1959) as Mrs Madge Hickson
- The Crowning Touch (1959) as Bebe
- Left Right and Centre (1959) as Mrs Maggs
- I'm All Right Jack (1959) as Mrs Kite
- The Night We Dropped a Clanger (1959) as Mrs Billingsgate
- Upstairs and Downstairs (1959) as Large Woman
- Desert Mice (1959) as Miss Patch
- Two-Way Stretch (1960) as Mrs Price
- Inn for Trouble (1960) as Lily
- Carry On Constable (1960) as Distraught Mother
- School for Scoundrels (1960) as Mrs Stringer
- Doctor in Love (1960) as Professor MacRitchie
- Make Mine Mink (1960) as Mme Spolinski
- A French Mistress (1960) as Staff Sgt Hodges
- No Kidding (1960) as Mrs Spicer
- The Pure Hell of St Trinian's (1960) as Miss Harker-Parker
- The Night We Got the Bird (1961) as Ma
- The Rebel (1961) as Mrs Cravatte
- A Weekend with Lulu (1961) as Florence Bell
- Double Bunk (1961) as Mrs Harper
- Watch It, Sailor! (1961) as Edie Hornett
- Nothing Barred (1961) as Elsie
- Just for Fun (1963) as Housewife
- Heavens Above! (1963) as Rene Smith
- You Must Be Joking! (1965) as Elderly Woman
- Morgan, a Suitable Case for Treatment (1966) as Mrs Delt
- The Wrong Box (1966) as Mrs Hackett
- Smashing Time (1967) as Mrs Gimble
- The Mini-Affair (1968) as Cook in Chinese Restaurant
- Wonderwall (1968) as Mrs Peurofoy
- The Italian Job (1969) as Miss Peach
- Doctor in Trouble (1970) as Mrs Dailey
- On a Clear Day You Can See Forever (1970) as Winnie Wainwhisle
- Rookery Nook (1970, TV) as Mrs Leverett
- The Private Life of Sherlock Holmes (1970) as Mrs Hudson
- For the Love of Ada (1972) as Ada Bingley
- Confessions of a Driving Instructor (1976) as Miss Slenderparts
- Adventures of a Private Eye (1977) as Miss Friggin
- Stand Up, Virgin Soldiers (1977) as Mrs Phillimore
- Come Play with Me (1977) as Lady Bovington
- The Last Remake of Beau Geste (1977) as Miss Wormwood
- The Hound of the Baskervilles (1978) as Mrs Barrymore
- The Great Rock & Roll Swindle (1979) as Cinema Usherette
- Metal Mickey (1980) as Granny
- Riding High (1981) as Gran
- In Sickness and in Health (1985) as Gwenneth (Series 2–3)
- Absolute Beginners (1986) as Mrs Larkin

== Radio ==
*: From 1959, Handl played various character parts in the radio comedy We're in Business, which starred Peter Jones and Harry Worth.

*: Sixty Minute Theatre: ' Dear Miss. Hope ', as Hilary Hope, Radio 2, 17th Dec.1969.

== Bibliography ==
- Thomas, Jane. "Irene Handl", Bete Noir, 4 (Winter, 1987), pp. 102–103.
- Thomas, Jane. "Irene Handl: The Last Interview", Bete Noir, 4 (Winter, 1987), pp. 104–116.
