= M'el Dowd =

American actress and singer (1933–2012)

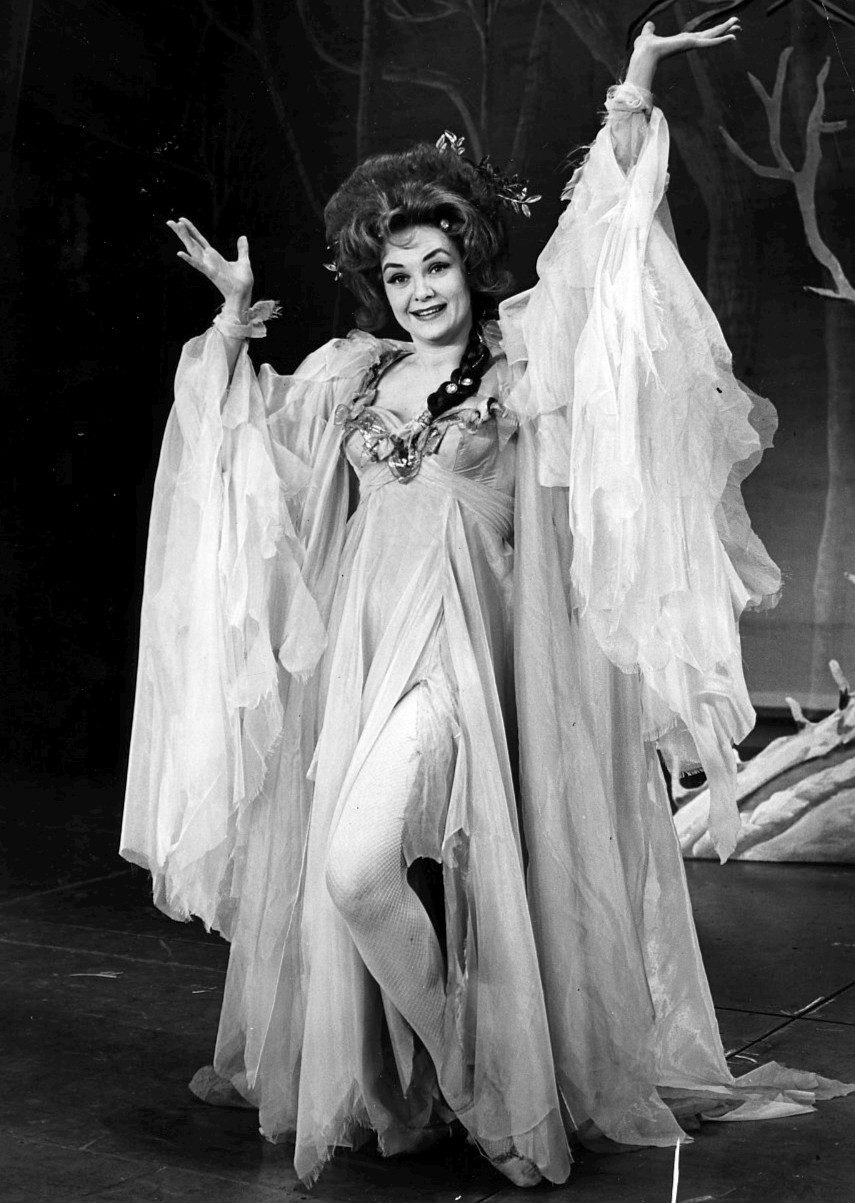
Dowd as Morgan le Fay in the Broadway show Camelot.

Mary Ellen Dowd (February 2, 1933 – September 26, 2012) was an American stage, musical theatre and film actress, and singer, whose career spanned half a century. Beginning in Shakespeare roles and films in the 1950s, Dowd continued to perform on stage, film and television into the 21st century. A frequent performer on Broadway in the 1960s, Dowd originated the role of Morgan le Fay in the musical Camelot.

== Early life and marriage ==
Dowd was born in Chicago, Illinois, the daughter of John J. Dowd and Catherine (née O'Conner) Dowd. She moved to Boone, Iowa, with her family in 1945 and attended junior high school and high school there, where she acquired the nickname "Mel", which an agent later turned into M'el. After high school, she studied at the Goodman Theatre in Chicago before moving to New York City.

In 1962, she married Henri G. Eudes, a native of France and restaurateur by vocation. The couple had one son, Richard.

== Career ==
Dowd made her professional debut Off-Broadway in the 1950s and soon appeared on Broadway, most notably originating the role of Morgan le Fay in the long-running musical Camelot. Other Broadway appearances included Back to Methuselah (1958), Everything in the Garden (1967–68), Tiger at the Gates (1968), Dear World (1969), Not Now, Darling (1970) and Ambassador (1972), among others. She also played in regional theatre and in more Off-Broadway roles, winning acclaim as Katherine of Aragon in The Royal Gambit.

From 1956 (in The Wrong Man with Henry Fonda) to 2005, she appeared in films, TV movies and guest spots on TV episodes, including Man on Fire with Bing Crosby in 1957, the 1986 film F/X as Joyce Lehman, and in the 1977 TV movie The Prince of Homburg, starring Frank Langella.

Dowd also helped her husband in the restaurant business and continued to act until at least 2005, when she appeared in a guest role on the TV show Law & Order. The New York Daily News wrote in 2001 that she played Mme. Armfeldt in A Little Night Music "deliciously". In Goodspeed Musicals' 2003 production of Me and My Girl, according to Variety, "Dowd ... is the cement that holds this production together."

== Death ==
She died on September 26, 2012, at her home in Tarrytown, New York, aged 79.

== Selected stage roles ==
- Macbeth – Lady Macbeth (1955; Off-Broadway, Jan Hus Theatre, NYC)
- A Midsummer Night's Dream – Titania, (1956; Jan Hus Theatre, NYC)
- Romeo and Juliet – Lady Capulet (1956; Jan Hus Theatre, NYC)
- Julius Caesar – Portia (1957; Jan Hus Theatre, NYC)
- Back to Methuselah – Lilith (1958; Ambassador Theatre and national tour)
- Sweet Bird of Youth – Understudy for Princess Kosmonopolis (1959–60; Martin Beck Theatre)
- Camelot – Morgan Le Fey (1960–63)
- A Case of Libel – Anita Corcoran (1963–64; Longacre Theatre)
- The Right Honourable Gentleman – Mrs. Emilia Pattison (1965–66; Billy Rose Theatre, nominated for the Tony Award for Best Play)
- The Sound of Music – Elsa Schraeder (1967; City Center Theatre)
- Heartbreak House – Hesione Hushabye (1967; Arena Stage, Washington, DC)
- Everything in the Garden – Louise (1967–68; Plymouth Theatre)
- Tiger at the Gates – Andromache (1968; Vivian Beaumont Theater)
- Dear World – Countess Aurelia (1969; Mark Hellinger Theatre)
- Not Now, Darling – Maude Bodley (1970; Brooks Atkinson Theatre)
- Ambassador – Amelia Newsome (1972; Lunt-Fontanne Theatre)
- The Night of the Iguana – Frau Fahrenkopf (1985; Morris Mechanic Theatre, Baltimore, MD)
- A Little Night Music – Madame Armfeldt (2001; Goodspeed Musicals)
- Me and My Girl - Maria, Duchess of Dene (2003; Goodspeed Musicals)

== Film and TV roles ==
- The Wrong Man – Miss O'Connor (Warner Bros., 1956)
- The Adventures of Jim Bowie – Nun in "The Bounty Hunter" (1957)
- This Could Be the Night - Mrs. Flint (MGM, 1957)
- Man on Fire – Rita (MGM, 1957)
- Flipper – Amy Field in "City Boy" (1964)
- The Best of Everything – Kate Farrow (1970)
- The 300 Year Weekend – Carole (Cinerama, 1971)
- The Adams Chronicles (1975 mini-series)
- The Prince of Homburg (1977)
- F/X (1986) – Joyce Lehman
- Murder, She Wrote - Sister Margaret-Mary in "Old Habits Die Hard" (1987)
- See You in the Morning (1989) – Real Estate Lady
- Third Watch "Black and Blue" (2004)
- Law & Order – Mrs. Haiduk in "License to Kill" (2005)
