= She's Done It Again (play) =

1969 play

- Written by: Michael Pertwee
- Original language: English
- Genre: Comedy

Premiere
- Date premiered: 15 October 1969
- Place premiered: Garrick Theatre, London

She's Done It Again is a 1969 comedy play by the British writer Michael Pertwee. A farce, it ran at the Garrick Theatre in London's West End from 15 October 1969 to 23 May 1970. This marked a shorter run than any of the Whitehall farces that star Brian Rix had appeared in, although it received considerably better reviews.

Aside from Rix the London cast included Margaret Nolan, Anna Dawson, Leo Franklyn, Derek Royle, Robert Dorning, Michael Kilgarriff, Hazel Douglas and Anthony Sharp. A subsequent UK tour (31 August to 28 November 1970) involved some cast changes, including Valerie Leon replacing Margaret Nolan and Leonard Trolley substituting for Anthony Sharp.

== Bibliography ==
- Foss, Roger. May the Farce Be With You. Bloomsbury Publishing, 2012.
- Smith, Leslie. Modern British Farce: A Selective Study of British Farce from Pinero to the Present Day. Rowman & Littlefield, 1989.
