= VocalEyes =

English charitable organisation

- Formation: 1998
- Type: Registered charity
- Legal status: Active
- Headquarters: London, England
- Region served: United Kingdom
- Website: vocaleyes.co.uk

VocalEyes is a registered charity in England that works with arts organisations across the United Kingdom to identify and remove barriers to access and inclusion for blind and partially sighted people. Established in 1998, its primary activity is to provide live audio descriptions of theatrical plays. The organisation has subsequently worked with museums, galleries and heritage venues to deliver audio descriptions for exhibitions, as well as conducting research and training to increase disability-access to the arts.

The charity has worked with Open House London, the Royal National Institute of Blind People, and the Art Fund.

Audio description of London Zoo, by Andrew Sachs. Part of the London Beyond Sight project

The 2012 London Beyond Sight campaign organised by VocalEyes recruited celebrities from London, such as Andrew Sachs, Alison Steadman and Barbara Windsor, to record audio descriptions of London landmarks so that they could be enjoyed by people who could not see them. In 2013 the project won a Jodi Award, for the best use of digital technology in widening access for disabled people and in 2016 the recordings were released under an open licence.

On 8 October 2008, it set the Guinness World Record for the "largest audience for audio described theatre", one hundred and sixty-eight people, at a performance of Les Misérables at the Queen's Theatre, on Shaftesbury Avenue, in London.
