= The Night We Dropped a Clanger =

1959 British film by Darcy Conyers

- UK theatrical release poster
- Directed by: Darcy Conyers
- Written by: John Chapman
- Produced by: David Henley; Sydney Box
- Starring: Brian RIx; Cecil Parker; William Hartnell; Leslie Phillips
- Cinematography: Ernest Steward
- Edited by: Sidney Stone
- Music by: Edwin Braden
- Production companies: Four Star Films; Sydney Box Associates
- Distributed by: Rank Organisation
- Release date: 20 September 1959; (Blackpool)
- Running time: 86 minutes
- Country: United Kingdom
- Language: English
- Budget: £65,000

The Night We Dropped a Clanger (released in the US as Make Mine a Double), is a 1959 black and white British comedy film directed by Darcy Conyers and starring Brian Rix, Cecil Parker, William Hartnell and Leslie Phillips. It was written by John Chapman.

The title comes from the British expression "to drop a clanger", meaning to make a big mistake. It links in the title to the secondary meaning of "clang", the noise of a metallic object hitting the floor.

A British secret agent is sent on a secret operation in occupied France during the Second World War but a diversionary tactic turns into a farcical tale of mistaken identity.

Andrew Sachs made his film debut in a minor role.

== Plot ==
When mysterious, unpiloted, midget aircraft start landing in southern England during the Second World War, secret agent Wing Commander Blenkinsop, VC and bar, is chosen for a top-secret mission to occupied France to investigate. Meanwhile, as a diversionary tactic to deceive the Germans, his exact look-alike, Aircraftsman [sic] Atwood, is reluctantly recruited to go to North Africa. However, through a farcical mixup, Blenkinsop finds himself in Africa and Atwood ends up in France.

By far more luck than judgement, Atwood returns to England in one of the buzz bombs and, with everyone (including Blenkinsop's girlfriend Lulu) believing he is Blenkinsop, he becomes a national hero, while the real Blenkinsop desperately tries to regain his identity and his life. Atwood continues the impersonation, but when he meets Lulu's mother, his future mother-in-law, he begins to have doubts. Accidentally meeting Blenkinsop, they swap back to their real identities.

== Cast ==
- Brian Rix as Aircraftman Arthur Atwood/Wing Commander Blenkinsop
- Cecil Parker as Air Vice-Marshal Sir Bertram Bukpasser
- William Hartnell as Warrant Officer Bright
- Leslie Phillips as Squadron Leader Thomas
- Leo Franklyn as Belling
- John Welsh as Squadron Leader Grant
- Toby Perkins as Flight Lieutenant Spendal
- Liz Fraser as Lulu
- Charles Cameron as General Gimble
- Vera Pearce as Madame Grilby
- Julian D'Albie as Air Marshal Carruthers
- Sarah Branch as WAAF Hawkins
- Irene Handl as Mrs. Billingsgate
- Andrew Sachs as Briggs
- Hattie Jacques as Ada
- Arthur Brough as Admiral Bewdly
- Ray Cooney as Corporal
- Oliver Johnston as Air Commodore Turner
- Merilyn Roberts as 1st WAAF
- Sheila Mercier as 2nd WAAF
- Christine Russell as 3rd WAAF
- Larry Noble as farmer
- John Langham as Ricky
- Rowland Bartrop as Smythe
- Julie Mendez as dancer
- Patrick Cargill as Fritz

== Production ==
The film was to be the first of four comedy films made by Four Star Films, the production company of noted theatrical writer and actor Brian Rix. According to Rix he was approached by Sydney Box "who declared he was going to launch me into film stardom and offered me a three-picture contract – which I accepted with indecent haste. I didn't realise that Sydney had done a deal with Rank to provide pictures for their so-called National Circuit, – which, in reality, was all the old beat-up cinemas grouped together in one last desperate bid to keep bingo at bay."

According to Sheila Mercier, who appeared in the movie, Box was going to make six films in all for Rank, three of which would start Rix.

Rix later wrote "I played my own double. This was a particularly popular type of film at the time, sparked off, I suspect, by I Was Monty's Double, and in fact ours was a sort of skit on that subject, well written by John Chapman."

The movie was made through Sydney Box Associates. Filming started in May 1959. It took place over six weeks.

Rix recalled the budget as being £65,000 "which is ridiculous when you consider the cast we put together and the amount we had to pay for a process called 'travelling-matt' which enabled me to play with myself. In case of doubt, I will rephrase that statement. I was able to talk to myself and walk round myself far more effectively than in the old "split screen days", and really the whole thing looked pretty good. We also had Cecil Parker being very funny and it was a delight to appear with such a consummate comedy actor."

The movie was meant to launch a new comedy series along the lines of "The Carry On" films with each movie to be called, "The Night We" [insert title].

== Release ==
An album, "The Clanger March", was released to promote the film.

Rix later wrote "It was a funny film, it did make money on the disastrous national circuit and, for once, I felt I gave a reasonably good performance as the pompously brave Wing Commander and his stupidly simple lavatory attendant double."

== Reception ==
=== Box office ===
In October 1959 Kinematograph Weekly reported "that unblushing lowbrow service comedy The Night We Dropped A Clangeris following up its successful run in Blackpool by prising open the purses of London ninepennies. Don't forget it stars Rix, idol of the stage charabanc trade." The following month the same magazine said the film had "been relished by the " ninepennies." The uninhibited rib-tickler, far from dropping a clanger, collected some real brass, particularly in industrial spots."

In December 1959 Kinematograph Weekly claimed the film "did well" at the box office although the magazine did not list it among the movies that performed "better than average" for the year. However there were sequels (see below).

=== Critical reception ===
The Monthly Film Bulletin wrote: "A Whitehall Theatre-style farce that moves slowly and unfunnily to a weak, skimped climax. Its ancient jokes, commonplace shouted dialogue, predictable situations, stock caricatures and unimaginative direction give it the tired air of a routine that has gone on far too long. Perhaps its principal distinction among British films is that it has three scenes set in men's lavatories."

Kinematograph Weekly called it "A poor man's parody on I Was Monty's Double" which "gives Brian Rix... a chance to shine, but, although he has flashes of brilliance, the overall is no dazzling example of low-or high-brow wit. The down-to-earth nonsense should, nevertheless, tickle the crowd. It always has!"

Variety wrote: "The Night We Dropped Clanger emerges as one of the unfunniest screen comedies in several years. Chapman's screenplay is contrived and strains desperately for laughs which not even a very competent cast can provide on account of lack of fuel. Daroy Conyer's direction is plodding and again depends largely on material that just isn't there. Maybe the public will fall for this trite, lumbering stuff but one way and another the whole affair is a disaster. ... Dialog Is labored and cheap: situations are predictable. So the whole thing fizzles out. Rix does a workmanlike job in two very different roles and clearly bas a screen future as a light comedy actor even though the idiot type is now becoming slightly out-of-date. Cecil Parker is wasted as a fatuous, absent-minded highranking Air Force officer, and Leslie Phillips, Liz Fraser John Welsh and William Hartnell are others who struggle in vain against their material."

Filmink wrote the film "tries anything for a laugh in a way that's endearing though it's also tiresome in places."

The Radio Times Guide to Films gave the film 2/5 stars, writing: "This identity switch picture set during the Second World War tends to stretch its comic notions to breaking point. More disciplined comic timing would have provided an effective cure for the problem. However, farce king Brian Rix is a sensible choice for this wartime foolishness and he switches convincingly from military rigour (in one guise) to gormlessness (in the other)"

Sky Movies wrote, "a typically rickety British farce of the late Fifties, a time when the Carry On's were gaining their first foothold. This is a sort of Carry On Flying: Brian Rix has a field day in a dual role and there's even William Hartnell, giving his comic all as yet another barking NCO. Broad, unpolished, lowbrow fun."

== Sequels ==
The movie led to a three-picture deal with British Lion to make series of "The Night We" movies. The first was The Night We Got the Bird followed by The Night We Sprang a Leak and The Night We Had a Dream. Conyears said ""I know people will compare us with the ' Carry On' series but that doesn't worry us. If we're half as successful as Peter Rogers we shall be very happy."

By August 1960 they were making the third in the series but only Clanger had been released. Conyers declared, "I suppose it is unusual to be making follow-ups of pictures that haven't yet been tested by the public, but the distributors seem confident enough. In fact, they've given marvellous deal—and first-class working conditions. From starting day to completion we are never interfered with, no sudden script changes or someone breathing down your neck. We are left free to get on with it in the way we think best."

Rix later wrote in his memoirs that Clanger "actually did make money but I think it was the only one" of his three-picture deal "that did. Anyway, just after we'd finished it, Sydney Box suffered a stroke, so my contract lapsed and my dreams of sitting on the right hand of Cecil B. de Mille rather fell by the wayside."

Bird did not do well at the box office so The Night We Sprang a Leak was retitled Nothing Barred.

== Notes ==
- Rix, Brian (1977). My farce from my elbow.
