= Roly Bain =

English priest and clown (1954–2016)

- Born: David Roualeyn Findlater Bain; 18 January 1954
- Died: 11 August 2016 (aged 62)
- Occupations: Clown; priest
- Known for: Clown ministry

David Roualeyn Findlater "Roly" Bain (18 January 1954 – 11 August 2016) was an English priest and clown who preached and performed as Holy Roly. He helped set up the organisation Holy Fools.

== Early life and education ==
Roly Bain's father was Kenneth Bruce Findlater Bain, a theatre critic who wrote under the name Richard Findlater. His mother was Romany Bain, a freelance journalist. He was one of triplets. He attended St. Paul's School in West London, then read theology at Bristol University and Cuddesdon Theological College. He was ordained an Anglican priest in 1978. In 1990 he spent a year at Fooltime (now Circomedia), a circus training college in Bristol, and became a professional clown. He served in parallel as an associate vicar at St Mary the Virgin Church in Olveston.

== Career ==
After serving as a parish priest, Bain decided to convey the Christian message through a different route, inspired by his lifelong love of clowns. His father had written a biography of the famous clown Joseph Grimaldi. As a young boy, Bain had loved the sad-faced clown Coco. So he took a clown's training and became a freelance clown-priest, presenting the Gospel message through jokes and pratfalls. He performed in churches, conference halls, hospitals, schools, football fields, and prisons. He would enter the venue on a unicycle, open with the invocation "Let us play!", and preach while balancing on (or falling from) a slackrope, a speciality of Bain. Like Coco, Bain performed as an Auguste, a clumsy character who is on the receiving end of water buckets and accidents, and who often works as a foil to the more clever and arrogant stage personality of the white-faced clown. According to Bain, the Auguste role allowed him to provide a mirror to everyday personalities, if it was not too exaggerated. He often took on the stock character roles of the Jester and the Vulnerable Lover. He performed routines like juggling and egg-smashing and blew soap bubbles. According to his website, he had custard-pied ten bishops, and "most were grateful – or at least happy to play".

Bain traced the origins of his clown ministry to the "holy fools" and "feasts of fools" of the Middle Ages, and quoted Saint Paul saying "We are fools for Christ". (1 Corinthians 4:10) He was the only Church of England priest to work full-time as a clown. He once said, "That is the only sort of clowning I do: getting across the Christian message to different audiences in different ways". He took his act to Europe, America, and Australia. He was partially supported by a non-profit organisation called The Faith and Foolishness Trust, which supports clown-priests. In 1982, he helped to set up Holy Fools, an organisation to support clown ministry. He was a member of both the College of Evangelists and Clowns International; at Clowns International he served as chaplain.

He wrote several books: Fools Rush In (1993), Clowning Glory (1995, with Patrick Forbes), and Playing the Fool (2001), a memoir. In 1994, he was named Clown of the Year by Clowns International, and in 1999 he received Clowns International's Slapstick prize.

== Mentions in academic publications ==
A 1996 German monograph by Angelika Richter and Lori Zonner in the Journal of Religion and Health, described by Marc Abrahams in his book This Is Improbable, called Bain the most prominent spiritual clown in England. The "Clown" entry in the Encyclopedia of Christian Education mentions Bain, adding that clown ministry is "an authentic way of doing theology" which offers unique insights into the nature of God and humanity, and as such has been accepted by mainline denominations. Sandra Billington's 2015 book A Social History of the Fool describes the inspirational aspects of the clownerie and its spread of "a kind of mental oxygen". She draws parallels between Bain celebrating the Christian court jester (for example, in his 2001 book) and similar publications such as 1999's The Corporate Fool, which advocates "creative folly" in the workplace.

== Personal life ==
Bain married Jane Smith in 1984. The couple had two sons, Jack and Samuel Bain, but separated in 2008. Roly Bain died of cancer in 2016 at the age of 62.

== Publications ==
- Fools Rush in: A Call to Christian Clowning (1993, with Hector McDonnell)
