= The Night We Got the Bird =

1961 British film by Darcy Conyers

- DVD Cover
- Directed by: Darcy Conyers
- Written by: Darcy Conyers; Ray Cooney; Tony Hilton
- Produced by: Darcy Conyers; Brian Rix
- Starring: Brian Rix; Dora Bryan; Ronald Shiner; Liz Fraser
- Cinematography: S.D Onions
- Edited by: Thelma Connell
- Music by: Tommy Watt
- Distributed by: British Lion
- Release date: 1961
- Running time: 82 minutes
- Country: United Kingdom
- Language: English

The Night We Got the Bird is a 1961 British comedy film directed by Darcy Conyers and starring Brian Rix, Dora Bryan, Ronald Shiner and Irene Handl. It was written by Conyers, Rix and Tony Hilton, based on Basil Thomas's 1957 play The Lovebirds.

It was the follow-up to The Night We Dropped a Clanger (1959), and includes the last film appearance by Ronald Shiner.

The title references a phrase in British English with its origin in the world of 19th century theatre, where it was customary to hiss like a goose to express disapproval.

== Plot ==
When unscrupulous Brighton antiques dealer Cecil Gibson dies in a road accident, his widow Julie remarries, and her new husband Bertie was Cecil's innocent but naive business partner. One of their wedding presents, from an unknown source, is a mouthy South American parrot, which appears to be a reincarnated Cecil whose aim is to make married life difficult for Bertie. As Bertie and Julie go off on their honeymoon, they are chased by a gangster because of a fake antique bed that the late Cecil substituted for the real thing which he then sold for a profit.

== Cast ==
- Brian Rix as Bertie Skidmore
- Dora Bryan as Julie Skidmore
- Ronald Shiner as Cecil Gibson
- Leo Franklyn as Victor
- Liz Fraser as Fay
- Irene Handl as Ma
- Terry Scott as P. C. Lovejoy
- Reginald Beckwith as Chippendale Charlie
- John Le Mesurier as court clerk

== Production ==
The film was announced for Sydney Box Associates.

The film was made at Shepperton Studios, Surrey, England, and on location.

The Night We Dropped a Clanger led to a three-picture deal with British Lion to make series of "The Night We" movies. The first was The Night We Got the Bird followed by The Night We Sprang a Leak and The Night We Had a Dream. Conyears said "“I know people will compare us with the ‘ Carry On’ series but that doesn't worry us. If we're half as successful as Peter Rogers we shall be very happy."

"I suppose it is unusual to be making follow-ups of pictures that haven't yet been tested by the public, but the distributors seem confident enough," said Conyers in August 1960. "In fact, they've given marvellous deal—and first-class working conditions. From starting day to completion we are never interfered with, no sudden script changes or someone breathing down your neck. We are left free to get on with it in the way we think best.”

== Critical reception ==
The Monthly Film Bulletin wrote: "Really rather a lamentable example of British slapstick, studded with hoary gags about honeymoons, dominating mothers, discarded trousers and all manner of cloacal by-play. The brisk pace fails to make up for an appalling lack of discrimination, and only one good scene, with John Le Mesurier as a long-suffering Court Clerk and Kynaston Reeves as a deaf magistrate, manages to emerge above the general seaside-postcard level."

TV Guide wrote, "sophomoric British comedy ...The script finds lots of excuses for people to lose their pants and make vulgar, inane sexual jokes that wouldn't amuse a 10-year-old."

Allmovie wrote, "several hilarious slapstick scenes involving chases or sexual encounters, as well as the more reserved wit found in caricatures like an inept magistrate, are all hallmarks of a typically British sense of humor here (shared by many non-Brits)."

Sky movies wrote, "a fast and furious farce ...With humour that's a notch below the contemporary 'Carry On' films. Never mind, there are some priceless cameo performances from the supporting cast, including Robertson Hare as a dithering doctor, John le Mesurier as a long-suffering court clerk, Kynaston Reeves, hilarious as a deaf magistrate, and Terry Scott as a constable."
