= Not Now, Darling =

1967 farce

Not Now
- Original language: English
- Written by: John Chapman; Ray Cooney
- Genre: Comedy

Premiere
- Date: 1967
- Place: Richmond Theatre, Richmond, England

Not Now, Darling is a 1967 farce written by English playwrights John Chapman and Ray Cooney, first staged at the Richmond Theatre, in Richmond, England prior to a long West End run. In 1970, it ran for a short time on Broadway at the Brooks Atkinson Theatre.

== Synopsis ==
Not Now, Darling is a romantic comedy featuring a cast size of six women and five men. It is 120 minutes long in two acts.The farce takes place in a London fur salon. A man attempts to win a married woman's favor, but his scheme spirals out of control.

== Production history ==
Not Now, Darling was first staged at the Richmond Theatre, in Richmond, England prior to a long West End run at the Strand Theatre. The off-West End production was directed by Maurice Stewart, and the West End production was directed by Patrick Cargill.

In 1970, the play had a short run on Broadway. It ran for 11 preview performances and 21 regular performances at the Brooks Atkinston Theatre, with the first preview on October 20, opening night on October 29, and closing night on November 15.

It was adapted as a film in 1973.

=== Casting History ===
Character	Richmond	West End	Broadway
Character	1967	1968	1970
Arnold Crouch	Ray Cooney	Bernard Cribbins	Norman Wisdom
Gilbert Bodley	Rex Garner	Donald Sinden	Rex Garner
Miss Tipdale	Stephanie Cole	Carmel McSharry	Joan Bassie
Janie McMichael	Lynda Baron	Jill Melford	Roni Dengel
Harry McMichael	Ian Gardiner	Brian Wilde	Ed Zimmermann
Maude Bodley	Mary Allen	Mary Kenton	M'el Dowd
Miss Whittington	Pamela Merrick	Ann Sydney	Marilyn Hengst
Sue Lawson	Lisa Peake	Shirley Stelfox	Ardyth Kaiser
Mrs. Frencham	-	Pearl Hackney	Jean Cameron
Mr. Lawson	-	David Hargreaves	Curt Dawson
Mr. Fencham	-	Tom Gill	Claude Horton
