= Richard Findlater =

British theatre critic and biographer

Richard Findlater (1921–1985) was a British theatre critic and biographer.

== Early life ==
He was born Kenneth Bruce Findlater Bain, but worked under the pen-name Richard Findlater.

== Career ==
Findlater was arts editor for The Observer, and became assistant editor in 1963.

He wrote 18 books, including biographies of Michael Redgrave, Peggy Ashcroft, Laurence Olivier, Ralph Richardson, Lillian Baylis and Joseph Grimaldi; a history of stage censorship, Banned; and an account of contemporary British theatre, The Unholy Trade.

== Publications ==
- Grimaldi: King of Clowns, 1955.
- Michael Redgrave, Mask or Face, 1958
- Memoirs of Joseph Grimaldi, MacGibbon & Kee, 1968
- Comic Cuts: A Bedside Sampler Of Censorship In Action Richard Findlater (ed) (Andre Deutsch, 1970) (illustrated by Willie Rushton)
- At the Royal Court: 25 Years of the English Stage Company, Amber Lane Press (1981); ISBN 0-906399-22-X

== Personal life ==
From 1948 to 1962, he was married to the journalist and showbusiness interviewer Romany Bain, with whom he had four children. One of their sons became an Anglican priest-clown known as Roly Bain or "Holy Roly".
