= Nothing Barred =

1961 British film by Darcy Conyers

- Original British quad poster
- Directed by: Darcy Conyers
- Written by: John Chapman
- Produced by: Darcy Conyers; Brian Rix
- Starring: Brian Rix
- Cinematography: S.D. Onions
- Edited by: Bert Rule
- Music by: Tommy Watt
- Production company: Rix-Conyers
- Distributed by: British Lion Film Corporation (UK)
- Release date: October 1961 (UK)
- Running time: 81 minutes
- Country: United Kingdom
- Language: English

Nothing Barred is a 1961 British black and white comedy film directed by Darcy Conyers and starring Brian Rix, Leo Franklyn and Naunton Wayne. It was written by John Chapman.

== Plot ==
Penniless Lord Whitebait plans to save his dwindling fortunes by opening his stately home, Whitebait Manor near Egham, to the public. But public interest proves minimal, and with rapidly mounting debts and the spiralling costs of his daughter's upcoming wedding threatening to ruin him, Whitebait is forced to take desperate measures. He and his servant Spankforth plot to stage the theft of a valuable painting from Whitebait Manor.

They go to Wormwood Scrubs prison to collect a suitable prisoner being released, but in error collect Wilfred Sapling, a plumber who has been doing repairs in the prison. Their conversation to get the man to steal a painting is at cross purposes and he thinks they are discussing plumbing. Meanwhile, elsewhere, a real burglar – Barger – chooses his next target and throws a dart at a map, hitting the town of Egham. Barger attempts to rob Whitebait Manor but is caught and sent to prison. Sapling goes to the prison to repair the plumbing and helps Barger and other convicts escape through the sewers dressed as a church choir. Sapling follows them and he in turn is pursued by PC Budgie. Sapling and Barger steal a police car to escape but are caught by the police.

== Cast ==
- Brian Rix as Wilfred Sapling
- Leo Franklyn as Barger
- Naunton Wayne as Lord Whitebait
- Charles Heslop as Spankforth
- Ann Firbank as Lady Katherine
- John Slater as Warder Lockitt
- Vera Pearce as Lady Millicent
- Arnold Bell as Governor
- Alexander Gauge as traffic policeman
- Jack Watling as Peter Brewster
- Irene Handl as Elsie
- Bernard Cribbins as the lodger
- Wally Patch as magazine stall proprietor (billed as Walter Patch)
- Wilfrid Lawson as Albert
- Terry Scott as PC Budgie
- Henry Kendall as parson
- Lionel Ngakane as convict
- Raymond Ray as convict
- Andrew Sachs as convict
- Denis Shaw as convict

== Production ==
The Night We Dropped a Clanger led to a three-picture deal with British Lion for Brian Rix and Darcy Conyears to make series of "The Night We" movies. The first was The Night We Got the Bird followed by The Night We Sprang a Leak and The Night We Had a Dream. Conyears said "“I know people will compare us with the ‘ Carry On’ series but that doesn't worry us. If we're half as successful as Peter Rogers we shall be very happy."

"I suppose it is unusual to be making follow-ups of pictures that haven't yet been tested by the public, but the distributors seem confident enough," said Conyers in August 1960 while making Leak. "In fact, they've given marvellous deal—and first-class working conditions. From starting day to completion we are never interfered with, no sudden script changes or someone breathing down your neck. We are left free to get on with it in the way we think best.”

However Bird did not do well commercially so The Night We Got the Bird was retitled Nothing Barred.

== Critical reception ==
The Monthly Film Bulletin wrote: "A typical Whitehall farce which soon abandons its mistaken identity theme for the lunacy of a mass prison break. On the way the flimsy plot takes in plenty of trouser-shedding, good-natured fun at the expense of the law, the hard-up aristocracy and the stately home racket, and finds room for Brian Rix's celebrated female impersonation act. Too much is laboured, but the improvisations of Leo Franklyn, Naunton Wayne, Charles Heslop, John Slater and Irene Handl fill out the nit-witted fringe."

TV Guide gave the film two out of four stars, and noted, "Another amusing farce by the Rix-Conyers team."
