= And the Same to You =

1960 British film by George Pollock

- Directed by: George Pollock
- Written by: John Paddy Carstairs; Additional dialogue by John Junkin; Terry Nation
- Based on: play "The Chigwell Chicken" by A. P. Dearsley
- Produced by: William J. Gell
- Starring: Brian Rix; William Hartnell; Tommy Cooper
- Cinematography: Stanley Pavey
- Edited by: Lito Carruthers
- Music by: Philip Green
- Production company: Monarch Film Corporation
- Distributed by: Eros Films
- Release date: February 1960
- Running time: 70 minutes
- Country: United Kingdom
- Language: English

And the Same to You is a 1960 British boxing-themed comedy film directed by George Pollock and starring Brian Rix and William Hartnell. It was written by John Paddy Carstairs, John Junkin and Terry Nation based on the 1955 stage farce The Chigwell Chicken by A.P. Dearsley.

== Premise ==
Stuck with the nickname "Dreadnought", Dickie Marchant feels he has no choice but to pursue a career as a boxer. However, to mollify his uncle, Marchant pretends to be the soul of religiosity, while his tough-talking manager, Walter "Wally" Burton, poses as a man of the cloth.

== Cast ==
- Brian Rix as Dickie "Dreadnought" Marchant
- William Hartnell as Walter "Wally" Burton
- Leo Franklyn as Rev. Sydney Mullett
- Tommy Cooper as Horace Hawkins
- Vera Day as Cynthia Tripp
- Sid James as Sammy Gatt
- Miles Malleson as Bishop
- Arthur Mullard as Tubby
- Renée Houston as Mildred Pomphret
- Dick Bentley as George Nibbs
- John Robinson as Archdeacon Humphrey Pomphret
- Terry Scott as Police Constable
- Shirley Anne Field as Iris Collins
- Ronald Adam as Trout
- Tony Wright as Percy "Perce" Gibbons
- Larry Taylor as Chappy Tuck
- Rupert Evans as Butch
- Tommy Duggan as Mike
- George Leech as Jake
- Lindsay Hooper as Bert Bender
- Jean Clark as manicurist
- Jennifer Phipps as secretary
- Jack Taylor as M.C.
- Micky Wood as referee
- Bob Simmons as Perce's opponent

== Reception ==
=== Box office ===
The film and Inn for Trouble were voted by Kine Weekly as the best British box office double bill for the year 1960.

=== Critical reception ===
The Monthly Film Bulletin wrote: "The nearer the action gets to stage farce, with its disguises, mistaken identities, outraged clergymen and rapid exits and entrances, the better it hangs together and the more amusing it becomes. The humour early on is obvious and silly, but the long climax is well-constructed and put across with a speed and verve often denied to more original comedy scripts. If the film is not quite as funny as it might be, perhaps that is because not all the players enter into the slightly pre-war spirit of the piece as wholeheartedly as Leo Franklyn and William Hartnell, or give as much to small parts as Sidney James and Tommy Cooper."

Kine Weekly wrote: "The picture has a poke at the cloth and the fight racket, but its sallies are never malicious. Vera Day is a perky Cynthia, William Hartnell definitely has his moments as Wally, and Brian Rix seldom misses a trick as battling parson-to-be Dickie. Tommy Cooper, Leo Franklyn, Dick Bentley and guest artist Sidney James also seize whatever opportunities come their way. The settings are quite good, but the director sometimes takes too long breaking from clinches."

Leslie Halliwell said: "Uninventive and unfunny comedy."

The Radio Times Guide to Films gave the film 2/5 stars, writing: "Any film boasting Sid James, Tommy Cooper and Brian Rix in the cast has to be worth a look, but there are few laughs to be had in this screen version of a popular stage farce. Rix stars as a singularly hopeless boxer who has to keep his career hidden from his disapproving archdeacon uncle. John Paddy Carstairs co-wrote the script with John Junkin, but every punch is pulled."
