= Andrew Sachs =

British actor (1930–2016)

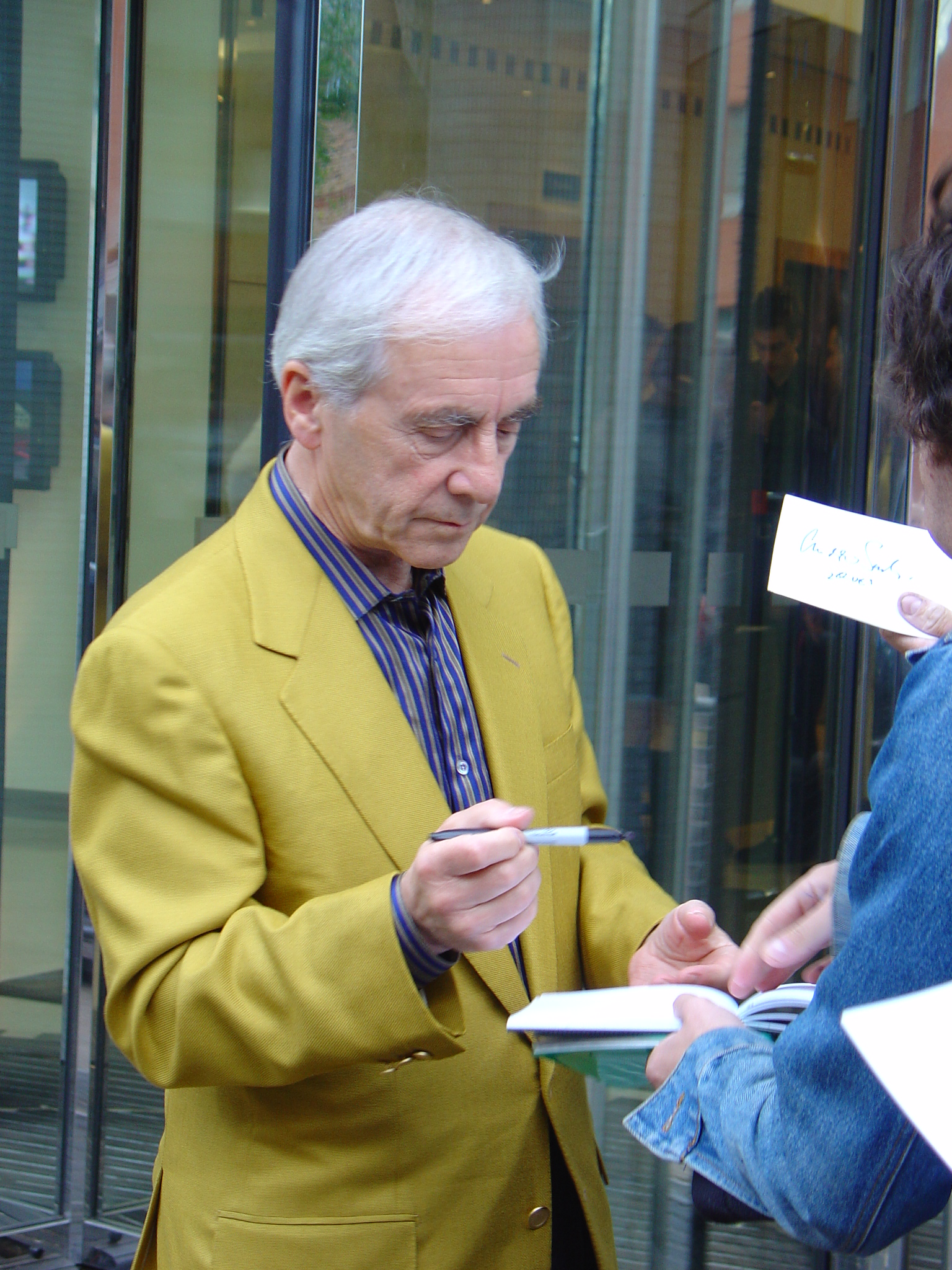
- Sachs in 2004
- Born: Andreas Siegfried Sachs; 7 April 1930; Berlin, Brandenburg, Prussia, Germany
- Died: 23 November 2016 (aged 86); Northwood, London, England
- Occupations: Actor; writer
- Years active: 1959–2016
- Spouse: Melody Lang (m. 1960)
- Children: 3, including John Sachs
- Sachs's voice Recorded in 2012, as part of an audio description of London Zoo for VocalEyes

Andreas Siegfried Sachs (7 April 1930 – 23 November 2016), known professionally as Andrew Sachs, was a German-born British actor. He made his name on British television and found his greatest fame for his portrayal of the comical Spanish waiter Manuel in Fawlty Towers.

Sachs had a long career in acting and voice-over work for television, film and radio. He was successful well into his eighties, with roles in numerous films such as Quartet, and as Ramsay Clegg in Coronation Street.

== Early life ==
Sachs was born on 7 April 1930 in Berlin, the son of Katharina (née Schrott-Fiecht), a librarian, and Hans Emil Sachs, an insurance broker. His father was Jewish and his mother was Lutheran, with Austrian ancestry. The family moved to Britain in 1938 to escape the Nazis. They settled in north London, and he lived in Kilburn from 1943 onwards; he was reportedly still a resident of the area in 2008.

== Career ==
=== Early work ===
In the late 1950s, while still studying shipping management at college, Sachs worked on radio productions, including Private Dreams and Public Nightmares by Frederick Bradnum, an early experimental programme made by the BBC Radiophonic Workshop. In the 1960s, he directed the popular serial The Dales for BBC Radio.

Sachs's first film appearance was as a schoolboy in Hue and Cry, Ealing comedies' first film in 1947. He began in acting with repertory theatre and made his West End debut as Grobchick in the 1958 production of the Whitehall farce Simple Spymen. He made his screen debut in 1959 in the film The Night We Dropped a Clanger. He then appeared in numerous television series throughout the 1960s, including some appearances in ITC productions such as The Saint (1962) and Randall and Hopkirk (Deceased) (1969).

=== Fawlty Towers ===
Sachs is best known for portraying Manuel, the Spanish waiter in the critically acclaimed sitcom Fawlty Towers (1975 and 1979), a role for which he was nominated for a BAFTA award (the award went to co-star John Cleese). He claimed in 1981 that Manuel was "really a very small part. In fact there was only one episode of Fawlty Towers – the one with the hamster – in which I had anything much to do."

Sachs recorded three singles in character as Manuel; the first was "Manuel's Good Food Guide" in 1977, in which he appeared, in character, on the cover. Sachs was co-author of the tracks. This was followed in 1979 by "O Cheryl" with "Ode to England" on the B side, under the name "Manuel and Los Por Favors". Sachs shares the writing credits for the B side with "B. Wade", who also wrote the A side. In 1981, at the urging of Elton John, "Manuel" released a cover version of Joe Dolce's worldwide hit "Shaddap You Face", with "Waiter, there's a Flea in my Soup" on the B side. When finally released it reached 138 in the UK Chart. Dolce prohibited Sachs from releasing his version until the original had been a hit.

He was the subject of This Is Your Life in 1980, when he was surprised by Eamonn Andrews while making a personal appearance as Manuel at the HMV store on London's Oxford Street.

Sachs, who had himself experienced life as a 'foreigner' in Britain, denied allegations that the character was based on racist stereotypes, arguing that Manuel could have been any 'foreign' worker.

During the shooting of the Fawlty Towers episode "The Germans", Sachs was left with second degree acid burns due to a fire stunt. He was also hit with a faulty prop on the set of the show by Cleese and suffered a severe headache.

In 2008, Sachs reprised the role of Manuel with Cleese for a Prince's Trust comedy performance.

=== Voice work and narration ===
Sachs was frequently heard as a narrator of television and radio documentaries, including all five series of BBC's BAFTA Award-winning business television series Troubleshooter presented by Sir John Harvey-Jones and ITV's ...from Hell series. He also narrated several audio books, including C. S. Lewis's Narnia series and Alexander McCall Smith's first online book, Corduroy Mansions, as well as two audiobooks of the popular children's TV series Thomas the Tank Engine and Friends "Thomas and the Tiger" and "Thomas and the Dinosaur". He provided the voice of Puzzle the Donkey in the Focus on the Family production of The Last Battle by C. S. Lewis. In 2000, Sachs narrated the spoof documentary series That Peter Kay Thing. He also narrated the documentary series Eyewitness, based on the children's books of the same name.

Sachs performed all the voices in the English-language version of Jan Švankmajer's 1994 film Faust. He also did voices for children's animation, including William's Wish Wellingtons, Starhill Ponies, The Gingerbread Man, Little Grey Rabbit, The Forgotten Toys, Asterix and the Big Fight. and the horse in the English-language version of 1970's cult TV show Monkey.

Roles for radio include G. K. Chesterton's Father Brown, 1984–1986, Dr. John Watson in four series of original Sherlock Holmes stories for BBC Radio 4, Jeeves in The Code of the Woosters, Edmond Dantès in The Count of Monte Cristo on BBC Radio 7's "Young Classics" series, Snowy in The Adventures of Tintin, and Tooley in Neil Gaiman's Neverwhere.

=== Later work ===
Although no other role gained him the same attention as Manuel, Sachs continued to star in a range of productions, both comedic and dramatic. In a reversal of his Fawlty Towers role, he was the hotel manager Don Carlos Bernardo in the 1977 Are You Being Served? movie, In addition he also played the recurring character of Barrister Jeremy Nisbett Q.C. in the Granada Television daytime series, Crown Court.

In 1980, Sachs starred in the title role of a four-part BBC adaptation of H. G. Wells's The History of Mr Polly. The following year, he portrayed a French Revolutionary in Mel Brooks's History of the World, Part I.

1988 saw Sachs and his wife Melody returning to Berlin to make a three-part BBC documentary following his early life in the city, comparing it with the divided Berlin of 1988. An excerpt exists in the BBC Archive.

In 1990, he appeared as a contestant on Cluedo, facing off against fellow actor Keith Barron.

In 1992, he voiced the titular gingerbread man in the animated series The Gingerbread Man. He also voiced the characters Mr. Salt, Herr Von Cuckoo and Sleek The Mouse.

In 1994, Sachs appeared in the popular Thames Television comedy drama series Minder. He played Sidney Myers in the episode "All Things Brighton Beautiful".

In 1996, Sachs portrayed Albert Einstein in an episode of the American PBS series NOVA, entitled "Einstein Revealed". In 1997, Sachs played opposite Shane Richie in Chris Barfoot's Dead Clean: in a tale of mistaken identity, Sachs plays airport window cleaner Kostas Malmatakis who is hired to assassinate a businessman by his greedy partner (Mark Chapman); the British short won a Gold Remi at the Houston Worldfest in 2001.

Sachs has had several roles in Doctor Who productions. He played "Skagra" in the webcast/audio version of the Doctor Who story Shada, completed by Big Finish Productions and in 2008 he played the elderly version of former companion Adric, in another Doctor Who story for the same company, The Boy That Time Forgot. In the 1980s, Sachs had submitted his name to be considered for the part of the Seventh Doctor in the television series.

In 2005, Sachs served as the performer for the audiobook version of Urchin of the Riding Stars, the first book of The Mistmantle Chronicles. In 2007, the BBC broadcast an adaptation of Dirk Gently's Holistic Detective Agency with Sachs portraying Reg (Professor Urban Chronotis, the Regius Professor of Chronology). He would later appear in another Adams adaptation as the Book in the live tour of The Hitchhiker's Guide to the Galaxy during its run at Bromley's Churchill Theatre.

On 17 November 2008, it was announced that Sachs had been approached to appear in ITV soap Coronation Street. He later confirmed on 14 December that he was taking up the offer, saying "My wife was such a fan that I've been watching it since 1962". In May 2009 he made his debut on the street as Norris' brother, Ramsay. He appeared in 27 episodes and left in August 2009.

Sachs toured with the Australian pianist Victor Sangiorgio in a two-man show called "Life after Fawlty", which included Richard Strauss's voice and piano setting of Alfred, Lord Tennyson's poem "Enoch Arden". 2012 saw his last major role, as Bobby Swanson in the movie Quartet.

=== Writing ===
Between 1962 and 1985 Sachs wrote a number of plays for theatre and radio, in parallel with his acting career. His first radio play, in 1962, was One Man and His Dog. Till Death Do Us Join, concerning Ernest Wire's desire to murder his wife, and Ruby Drab's hope to 'dispose of her spouse', was produced by the BBC in 1964 and broadcast in Australia as So You Want to Get Rid of Your Wife the following year. In 1978, BBC Radio 4 broadcast The Revenge, a ground-breaking 30-minute play totally without dialogue (an experiment in binaural stereo recording), written and performed by Sachs. It was dismissed by playwright Jonathan Raban as a "wordless sequence of noises" and "a well-puffed curiosity". The play has however subsequently been repeated a number of times on BBC Radio 4 Extra.

Made in Heaven, which had starred Sachs's future Fawlty Towers co-star Prunella Scales when produced for radio in 1971, was brought to the stage in 1975. As performed at the Chichester Festival it starred Patricia Routledge, Michael Bates and Patrick Macnee. Though it was a popular success, Sachs said in 1981, "the critics really slaughtered it ... Actually, I had to agree with the critics. There was a lot wrong with the play." He professed his intention to rewrite the work and stage it again.

Sachs claimed he would "concentrate on writing if anything happened to impair my acting. But I'm very much a part-time writer."

== Prank phone-call controversy ==
On 25 October 2008, the BBC apologised to Sachs and his agent after they had been informed that Russell Brand and Jonathan Ross had made several obscene phone calls to him during an episode of The Russell Brand Show recorded on 16 October and broadcast two days later, on which Sachs had agreed to appear. Both presenters had left explicit messages on Sachs's telephone answering machine stating that Brand had consensual sex with his granddaughter, Georgina Baillie.

Prime minister Gordon Brown criticised Ross and Brand's actions, saying that it was "clearly inappropriate and unacceptable behaviour", and the television watchdog, Ofcom, launched an inquiry into the matter. Brand and Controller of Radio 2 Lesley Douglas subsequently resigned and Ross was suspended. In February 2014, Sachs was interviewed by the BBC about his autobiography. He spoke of how the scandal still affected him.

== Personal life, illness and death ==
In 1960, Sachs married the actress, writer and fashion designer Melody Lang, who took his surname. He adopted her two sons from a previous marriage, one of whom was John Sachs and the couple had one daughter together in 1961. Lang appeared in one episode of Fawlty Towers, "Basil the Rat", as Mrs Taylor.

Sachs was diagnosed with vascular dementia in 2012, which eventually left him unable to speak and forced him to use a wheelchair. He died on 23 November 2016 at the Denville Hall nursing home in Northwood, London, aged 86. His funeral took place on 1 December, the same day his death was publicly announced.

On 2 December 2016, BBC One broadcast the Fawlty Towers episode "Communication Problems" in his memory. John Cleese paid tribute to Sachs, describing him as a "sweet, sweet man".

Melody Sachs died in 2017.

== Legacy ==
In July 2021 the BBC Two television series Secrets of the Museum reported on the waiter's costume, worn by Manuel, which had been gifted to Victoria and Albert Museum by the actor's daughter.

== Selected filmography ==
Year	Title	Role	Notes
1947	Hue and Cry	Schoolboy	Uncredited
1947	The Life and Adventures of Nicholas Nickleby	Schoolboy	Uncredited
1959	The Night We Dropped a Clanger	A.C.2 Briggs	
1961	Nothing Barred	Convict	
1962	We Joined the Navy	Short-changed U.S. seaman	Uncredited
1962	The Saint	Jacques (hotel concierge)	The Loaded Tourist, season 1, ep. 5
1973	Hitler: The Last Ten Days	Walter Wagner	
1974	Frightmare	Barry Nichols	
1974	Romance with a Double Bass	Musician Zhuchkov	
1975	Robin Hood Junior	Friar	
1975–1979	Fawlty Towers	Manuel	
1976	House of Mortal Sin	Man in Church	
1977	Are You Being Served?	Don Carlos Bernardo	
1978	What's Up Nurse!	Guido the waiter	
1978	Revenge of the Pink Panther	Hercule Poirot	
1981	History of the World, Part I	Gerard	Segment: "The French Revolution"
1988	Consuming Passions	Jason	
1989	Asterix and the Big Fight	Ardeco	English version, voice
1992	The Gingerbread Man	The Gingerbread Man	
1993	The Mystery of Edwin Drood	Durdles	
1994	Taxandria	André / Superintendent	
1994	Faust		English version, voice
1998	The Legend of the Lost Keys	George Gardener	
2000	Silent Witness	Josef Horowitz	S5 E1&2 The World Cruise
2001	Nowhere in Africa	Mr. Rubens	
2003	Cheeky	TV announcer	
2009	Coronation Street	Ramsay Clegg	
2010	Terry Pratchett's Going Postal	Tolliver Groat	
2012	Run For Your Wife	Clumsy waiter	
2012	Quartet	Bobby Swanson	
2014	Breaking the Bank	Jenkins	
2015	EastEnders	Cyril Bishop	
2016	Alice Through the Looking Glass	Mantel Clock	Uncredited, final film role

== Books ==
- 2015, I Know Nothing! The Autobiography, The Robson Press, ISBN 978-1849-5490-04 (shortlisted for The Sheridan Morley Prize, 2015)
