= Rix Centre =

The Rix Inclusive Research Institute is a research and development centre that was founded in 2004. The Centre, based at the University of East London, explores the uses of new media technology for the benefit of the learning disability community. It has developed multimedia technologies and courses to support those with learning disabilities and their careers.

== Leadership ==
The Rix Centre is named after Lord Brian Rix, the Baron Rix, chancellor of the University, who has campaigned for people with learning difficulties for over 60 years.

The Centre is headed by Associate Professor Gosia Kwiatkowska.

== Projects ==
=== Project @pple ===
Project @pple was a major ESRC-funded programme exploring the ways in which people with learning difficulties access and use information and communication technologies. Using observations, interviews and formal usability tests, project researchers built up a multi-layered view of computer use, Internet access and interaction with software among people with learning difficulties. To meet the aim of Project Apple, a multimedia Learning Environment (LE), providing learning resources and tools for self-advocacy, is being developed and tested with young people with learning difficulties, teachers and support-staff. Project @pple brought together researchers from a number of academic fields with multimedia producers from small and corporate businesses and the UK's leading learning disability charity, MENCAP.

=== The Big Tree ===
The Rix Centre runs The Big Tree, a website devoted to the sharing of ideas and information regarding multimedia and its potential uses in the learning disability community. The site's target users are individuals working with or supporting people with mental disabilities.

=== Other projects ===
The Rix Centre has overseen a number of projects involving research, development, and outreach. Some are large collaborative projects; the Rix Living Lab, for instance, was a long-term research and development collaboration with multiple London boroughs, East London voluntary organisations, individuals with learning disabilities, and their supporters. Other endeavors have had more specific aims, such as a collaborative project in Newham using easy-build websites, and a Tower Hamlets-based project focused on the development of a "new media interactive zone" for young people with profound learning disabilities to communicate via video and media technology.

The Rix Centre also hosted Inclusive New Media Design, a project aiming to encourage web designers, developers, and editors to build websites and multimedia content accessible to people with learning disabilities.
