= Rick =

Rick may refer to:

== People ==
- Rick (given name), a list of people and fictional characters with the given name
- Alan Rick (born 1976), Brazilian politician, journalist, pastor and television personality
- Johannes Rick (1869–1946), Austrian-born Brazilian priest and mycologist; also his botanical author abbreviation
- Marvin Rick (1901–1999), American middle-distance runner

== Units of measure ==
- Rick, a quantity of firewood, related to a cord, in some parts of the US
- Rick, a stack or pile of hay, grain or straw

== Other uses ==
- Tropical Storm Rick (disambiguation)
- Rick (film), a 2003 film starring Bill Pullman
- Rick (novel), a 2020 novel by Alex Gino
- RICK, stock ticker symbol for Rick's Cabaret International, Inc.

== See also ==
- Richard (disambiguation)
- Ricks (disambiguation)
- Ricky (disambiguation)
- Rix (disambiguation)
