= Thomas E. Ricks (Mormon pioneer) =

American Mormon pioneer (1828–1901)

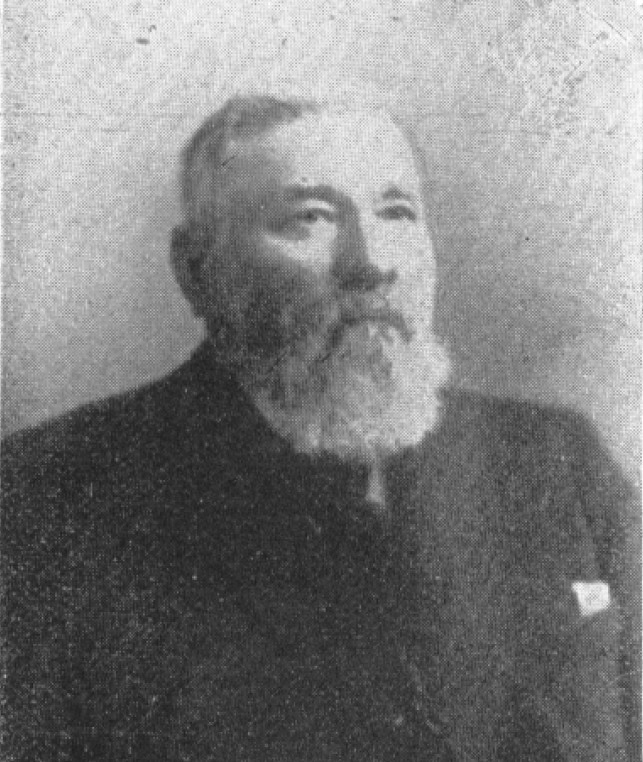

Personal details
- Born: Thomas Edwin Ricks; July 21, 1828; Trigg County, Kentucky, United States
- Died: September 28, 1901 (aged 73); Rexburg, Idaho, United States
- Signature

Thomas Edwin Ricks (July 21, 1828 – September 28, 1901) was a prominent Mormon pioneer, a community leader, and a settler of the western United States.

== Early years ==
Ricks was born on July 21, 1828, in Western Kentucky, the son of Joel Ricks and Eleanor Martin. In 1830, he moved with his family to Silver Creek, Illinois where his family started a branch of the Campbellite Church. In 1840, his family was introduced to missionaries from the Church of Jesus Christ of Latter Day Saints and in 1841, Ricks' parents and siblings were all baptized into the church. A month later the family moved to Nauvoo, Illinois, where Ricks helped in the construction of the Nauvoo Temple.

In 1844, Ricks had an accident while breaking a horse. The horse landed on his left leg. As a result of this accident Ricks' left leg did not grow as long as his right leg. As a result, wearing a platform shoe, he walked with a limp, and later used a cane.

== Pioneer years ==
At age twenty, Ricks crossed the plains to the Salt Lake Valley with the Church of Jesus Christ of Latter-day Saints (LDS Church). He initially crossed the Mississippi River heading west with the Charles C. Rich family. Ricks left the Rich family at Garden Grove, Iowa to meet up with the rest of his family in Council Bluffs, Iowa. Ricks stayed with his family for two years in Council Bluffs while Brigham Young took the first group of Mormon Pioneers to the Salt Lake Valley. One of the teams used by this first pioneer group was donated by the Ricks family. On May 29, 1848, Ricks left Winter Quarters, Nebraska headed for the Salt Lake Valley in Heber C. Kimball's company.

On June 6, 1848, a group of Native Americans raided Ricks' pioneer company, stealing some of their cattle. Ricks and some other youth in the camp went to pursue them. The youth were ambushed and Ricks was shot three times, twice in the kidneys and once in his backbone. His companions, sure he was dead, returned to the company. Learning of his son's demise, Joel Ricks set out to retrieve the body. Joel was ambushed by Native Americans and forced to return to camp where he was relieved to find that other men had located Thomas, floated him across the river on a buffalo hide, and conveyed him the rest of the way to the camp by wagon. As a result of the injury, Thomas traveled most of the way to the Salt Lake Valley in his family's wagon.

Ricks would later assist five additional groups of pioneers to make the same trek. In 1856, returning from a colonizing mission in Las Vegas, Nevada, he immediately left to be part of the rescue party sent from Salt Lake to assist the stranded Martin Handcart Company near the Sweetwater River.

A colonel in the Utah Militia, Ricks was commissioned to locate a better route from the Cache Valley to the Bear Lake Valley, in Northern Utah. While thus engaged, he discovered a natural spring flowing from the cavity of a large rock. To this day, Ricks' Spring bears his name. It can be found on U.S.-89, between Logan, Utah, and Bear Lake, on the Utah–Idaho border.

== Colonizing years ==
Ricks was an influential church and community leader in both Utah and Idaho. He is known as the founder of Rexburg, Idaho, and participated in the founding of the Bannock Stake Academy, which would eventually evolve into Brigham Young University–Idaho. The school was named in his honor for a period of 99 years first as Ricks Academy (1902–1917) and later as Ricks College (1917–2001).

Ricks served in the LDS Church as a bishop and stake president in the Rexburg area.

== Death ==
Ricks died September 28, 1901, at age 73. Joseph F. Smith, LDS Church president, said of him at his funeral, "It may be a long time before we find another man his equal in honor, mind, and unswerving loyalty to the cause of God and his people."
