= Joel Ricks =

American Mormon leader (1804 – 1888)

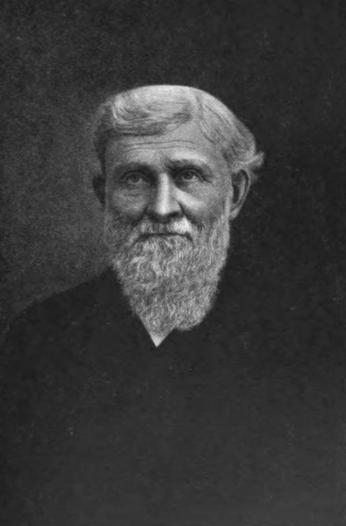
- Born: February 18, 1804; Christian County, Kentucky
- Died: December 15, 1888 (aged 84); Logan, Utah
- Occupations: Farmer, tanner
- Spouse: Eleanor Martin (m. 1826)
- Children: Thomas E. Ricks

Joel Ricks (February 18, 1804 – December 15, 1888) was a Mormon Pioneer and community leader who helped settled the Salt Lake Valley and Cache Valley, Utah. He was the father of Thomas E. Ricks.

== Early life ==
Joel Ricks was born on February 18, 1804, near Donaldson Creek in Christian County, Kentucky (in an area now in Trigg County), the son of Jonathan Ricks and Temperance Edwards. On May 18, 1826, he married Eleanor Martin and continued to work on his father's farm.

== Pioneer ==
While living in Illinois, Ricks met missionaries from the Church of Jesus Christ of Latter Day Saints (LDS Church) and was baptized in 1841. He eventually moved to Nauvoo, Illinois, to be with other members of his faith. Later persecutions forced him to leave Nauvoo and join the Mormon Pioneers in a migration to the Salt Lake Valley.

== Utah life ==
Ricks helped lead his pioneer company and arrived in Bountiful in September 1848. He began farming in Centerville, and later started a tannery in Farmington. In 1852 he married another wife. He moved his family to Logan, Utah, in 1859, where he continued tanning and was involved with the area's first sawmill and gristmill.

Ricks was active in the early Cache Valley community and helped establish the city of Logan. He was treasurer of Cache County for nearly twenty-five years and an officer in the Logan Canyon Road Company. He frequently provided equipment to the ongoing Mormon immigration and assisted in the construction of all the early community buildings. In the church, he was a longtime member of the Stake High Council and was ordained a Patriarch.

He died at his home in Logan on December 15, 1888.
