= Darcy Conyers =

British actor and director (1919–1973)

Darcy Conyers (1919–1972) was a British screenwriter, actor, producer and film director. He is sometimes credited as D'Arcy Conyers.

He made a number of films with Brian Rix.

He was the founder and creator of Bistro Vino in South Kensington, London, in 1964 - possibly the first casual dining restaurant in London. He also opened The Reject China Shop in Beauchamp Place, London SW3. He died in November of 1972.

== Selected filmography ==
Actor

- Bond Street (1948)
- The Jack of Diamonds (1949)
- Golden Arrow (1949)
- Trottie True (1949)
- Ha'penny Breeze (1950)
- Wings of Danger (1952)
- The Time of His Life (1955)
- The Blue Peter (1955)

Director

- The Secret of the Forest (1956)
- Soapbox Derby (1957)
- The Devil's Pass (1957)
- The Night We Dropped a Clanger (1959)
- The Night We Got the Bird (1961)
- Nothing Barred (1961)
- In the Doghouse (1962)
