= Whitehall farce =

1950s and 1960s comic stage plays in London

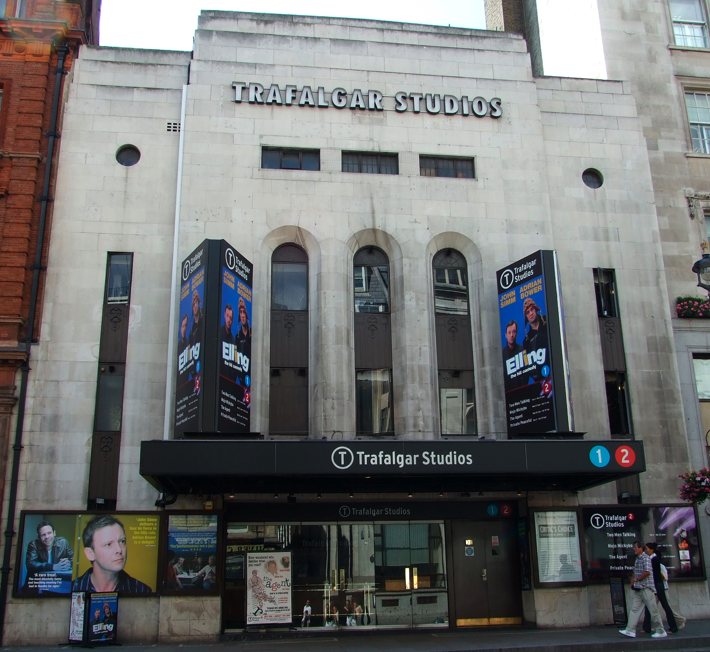
The Whitehall Theatre (now known as The Trafalgar Studios)

The Whitehall farces were a series of five long-running comic stage plays at the Whitehall Theatre in London, presented by the actor-manager Brian Rix, in the 1950s and 1960s. They were in the low comedy tradition of British farce, following the Aldwych farces, which played at the Aldwych Theatre between 1924 and 1933.

== History ==
=== The farces; critical reception ===
The five farces were as follows:

Title	Author	Premiere	Closed	Performances
Reluctant Heroes	Colin Morris	12 September 1950	24 July 1954	1,610
Dry Rot	John Chapman	31 August 1954	15 March 1958	1,475
Simple Spymen	John Chapman	19 March 1958	29 July 1961	1,403
One For the Pot	Ray Cooney and Tony Hilton	2 August 1961	4 July 1964	1,221
Chase Me, Comrade	Ray Cooney	15 July 1964	21 May 1966	773

Rix built a company of regular players who appeared in some or all of these shows. They included Leo Franklyn, Larry Noble, Dennis Ramsden and Derek Royle, and members of Rix's family: his wife, Elspet Gray, his sister, Sheila Mercier and his brother-in-law, Peter Mercier. Others who appeared in one or more of the Whitehall farces include Terry Scott and Andrew Sachs. Rix starred in all five plays, in a range of roles: a "gormless recruit" to the army in Reluctant Heroes; a timidly crooked bookie's runner in Dry Rot; a street musician recruited as a secret agent in Simple Spymen; four identical brothers in One For the Pot; and a harassed civil servant in Chase Me, Comrade. From Dry Rot onwards, Rix and his authors developed a double act for the Rix characters and those played by Leo Franklyn, in which the two performers played off one another rather as Ralph Lynn and Tom Walls had done in the Aldwych farces of the previous generation.

Although the five plays constituting the Whitehall farces had long runs and the theatres usually had full houses, the majority of London critics were dismissive of them. Writing in the Financial Times in 1980, Michael Coveney commented: "A tradition of critical snobbery has grown up around these plays, partly because they were so blatantly popular but chiefly because of our conviction that farce, unless written by a Frenchman, is an inferior theatrical species. Once the National Theatre has done its duty by Priestley and Rattigan and others teetering on the brink of theatrical respectability I suggest they employ Mr. Rix … to investigate the ignored riches of English farce between Travers and Ayckbourn." Some London critics of the 1950s and 1960s did not disregard them, including Harold Hobson, Ronald Bryden, J. W. Lambert and Alan Dent.

=== Television broadcasts; later productions ===
In addition to the five long-running farces, Rix presented a series of more than eighty one-off televised comedies, some of them farces, for the BBC. The first was transmitted live from the Whitehall Theatre in January 1956. There were also film versions of Reluctant Heroes (1951), Dry Rot (1956), and Chase Me, Comrade, which was renamed Not Now, Comrade (1976).

In 1966, having been unable to secure the lease of the Whitehall Theatre, Rix took his company on tour in Chase Me, Comrade and Bang, Bang Beirut (later retitled Stand By Your Bedouin), by Cooney and Hilton. Later productions by the Rix company at the Garrick Theatre and elsewhere included Uproar in the House (1967), by Anthony Marriott and Alistair Foot; Let Sleeping Wives Lie (also 1967) by Harold Brooke and Kay Bannerman; She's Done It Again (1969), by Michael Pertwee; Don't Just Lie There, Say Something (Pertwee, 1971); and A Bit Between the Teeth (Pertwee, 1974). According to Leslie Smith in a study of modern British farce, although some of the Rix productions after Chase Me, Comrade achieved substantial success, none of them had the conspicuously long runs of the five Whitehall farces. In 1976, Rix returned to the Whitehall with Fringe Benefits (Donald Churchill and Cooney), which ran until 1977 when he retired from the stage.
