= Brian Rix =

English actor-manager (1924–2016)

The Right Honourable The Lord Rix CBE DL
- Rix in 2008

Member of the House of Lords
- Lord Temporal
- Life peerage 27 January 1992 – 20 August 2016

Personal details
- Born: Brian Norman Roger Rix; 27 January 1924 Cottingham, East Riding of Yorkshire, England
- Died: 20 August 2016 (aged 92) Northwood, London, England
- Spouse: Elspet Gray (m. 1949; died 2013)
- Children: 4, including Jamie and Louisa
- Relatives: Sheila Mercier (sister)
- Occupation: Actor, activist
- Known for: Farces (particularly at the Whitehall Theatre and on the BBC); Campaigning for those with learning disabilities

Brian Norman Roger Rix, Baron Rix (27 January 1924 – 20 August 2016) was an English actor-manager, who produced a record-breaking sequence of long-running farces on the London stage, including Dry Rot, Simple Spymen and One for the Pot. His one-night TV shows made him the joint highest paid star on the BBC. He often worked with his wife Elspet Gray and sister Sheila Mercier, who became the matriarch in Emmerdale Farm.

After his first child was born with Down syndrome, Rix became a campaigner for disability causes, among others. He entered the House of Lords as a crossbencher in 1992 and was president of Mencap from 1998 until his death.

== Biography ==
=== Early years ===
Rix was born in Cottingham, East Riding of Yorkshire, the youngest of four children. His father, Herbert Rix, and Herbert's two brothers, ran the shipping company Robert Rix in Hull, founded by his grandfather. Rix had an interest in cricket and only wished to play for Yorkshire in his childhood. He played for Hull Cricket Club when he was 16 (and after the war for the Marylebone Cricket Club (MCC), the Stage and the Lord's Taverners). When he was being educated at the Quaker Bootham School, York, his ambitions changed.

His elder sister Sheila became an actress during his school days, and Rix himself developed the same ambition to go on the stage. All four Rix children had become interested in the theatre because of their mother, Fanny, who ran an amateur dramatic society and was the lead soprano in the local operatic society. All her children performed in the plays and two of them, Brian and Sheila, became professional actors. Sheila Mercier, as she became known, played Annie Sugden for more than 20 years in the Yorkshire TV soap opera Emmerdale Farm having worked regularly with her brother in the Whitehall farces in the 1950s and 1960s.

=== Actor-manager ===
Rix became a professional actor when he was 18, on deferment from service with the Royal Air Force, with Donald Wolfit's Shakespeare Company. After only four months as a professional actor, he played Sebastian in Twelfth Night at the St James's Theatre in London. His deferment was extended and he gained his first weekly repertory experience with the White Rose Players at the opera house in Harrogate. From there he went into the Royal Air Force, eventually ending up as a volunteer Bevin Boy working down the coal mines near Doncaster.

After the war, Rix returned to the stage, forming his own theatre company in 1947 as an actor-manager, a career he was to pursue for the next 30 years. He ran repertory companies at Ilkley, Bridlington and Margate, and while at Bridlington, in 1949, he found the play that was to bring him notice – Reluctant Heroes, later adapted for a film version. In the same year, he became engaged to Elspet Gray, an actress in his company, and six months later they married. They were together, domestically and professionally, for 64 years, until her death in February 2013, appearing alongside each other in many of the television farces, a radio series and three of the theatre productions.

In 1950 the newly-weds toured together with Reluctant Heroes until Rix managed to persuade the Whitehall Theatre management that this army farce was the ideal play to follow the long-running Worm's Eye View. It was a happy choice, for Rix's productions ran there for the next 16 years, before he moved to the Garrick Theatre, breaking many West End records in the process. His farces for BBC Television also began at the Whitehall, enlarging Rix and Gray's profile as well as that of the Whitehall Theatre.

During the next 18 years, Rix presented more than 90 one-night-only television farces on the BBC. These were often presented at Christmas or on other bank holidays with viewing figures often reaching 15 million. In the early 1960s, Rix was the highest-paid actor (along with Robert Morley) to appear on BBC television. Alongside the regulars from his theatre company, Rix appeared in these TV productions with such names as Dora Bryan, Joan Sims, Ian Carmichael, John Le Mesurier, Patrick Cargill, Fabia Drake, Sheila Hancock, Warren Mitchell, Thora Hird and Francis Matthews. Only a handful of the televised farces remain in the BBC archive, however. Rix also appeared in 11 films and though he felt these were less suited to his talents as a farceur, these also met with some box-office success.

==== Whitehall Theatre (1950–1966) ====
Reluctant Heroes, the first Whitehall farce, was by Colin Morris, later known for his dramatised television documentaries. During the four-year run of Reluctant Heroes at the Whitehall, Rix also sent out national tours of the play, generally with John Slater playing the dread Sergeant Bell, and always playing to packed houses. To give some sense of its popularity, at one time Rix had the play running at the Whitehall, three tours on the road and the film on release. Rix himself played the gormless north-country recruit, Horace Gregory, in both film and throughout the four-year run at the Whitehall, where his reputation for losing his trousers began. He subsequently lost them at least 12,000 times in the 26 years he was on stage in the farces; though he lost them less in the TV plays.

In the first two years at the Whitehall, Rix's understudy was John Chapman, who also played a small part in Act 3, which ensured a long wait in the dressing room. To occupy his time, he began the first draft of the play that was to follow Heroes. Dry Rot, later filmed, was produced in 1954 with John Slater, Basil Lord and Rix himself in the cast and ran for nearly four years. When Dry Rot went on tour with John Slater in the lead, he was joined by two young actors, Ray Cooney and Tony Hilton.

Both became involved in Rix's next production at the Whitehall, Simple Spymen (again by John Chapman) and had time to draft One for the Pot, which followed Simple Spymen. In all, seven playwrights were spawned by the Whitehall farces – Colin Morris, John Chapman, Ray Cooney, Tony Hilton, Clive Exton, Raymond/Charles Dyer and Philip Levene. Other writers of note who worked for Rix on television included Christopher Bond, John Cleese and Barry Took.

Ronald Bryden (in the New Statesman) wrote of Rix and his company in 1964 after the opening of the fifth Whitehall farce, Chase Me Comrade:

There they are: the most robust survivors of a great tradition, the most successful British theatrical enterprises of our time. Curious that no one can be found to speak up wholeheartedly for them – no one, that is, outside enthusiastic millions who have packed every British theatre where they have played. ... It's particularly curious considering the current intellectual agitation for a theatre of the masses, a true working class drama. Everything, apparently, for which Joan Littlewood has struggled – the boisterous, extrovert playing, the integrated team-work, the Cockney irreverance of any unself-conscious, unacademic audience bent purely on pleasure – exists, patently and profitably at the Whitehall. Yet how many devout pilgrims to Stratford East have hazarded the shorter journey to Trafalgar Square to worship at the effortless shrine at the thing itself? How many Arts Council grants have sustained Mr Rix's company? How many Evening Standard awards went to Dry Rot? How many theses have been written on the art of Colin Morris, John Chapman and Ray Cooney? The time has come surely to fill the gap.

Despite being described by Harold Hobson in The Sunday Times as "The greatest master of farce in my theatre-going lifetime" and numerous other plaudits from critics and audiences alike, no theatrical awards were ever forthcoming. Rix was always philosophical about his lack of recognition, accepting it as the fate of so many low comedians before him. Nevertheless, Rix and his company broke the record for the longest running farce team in London's West End. In 1961 he gave a glass of champagne to every member of the audience who had watched Simple Spymen. The drink was served by many of the popular actors who had been with Rix in one of his productions – on stage, on television and in films – and was to celebrate the Whitehall Theatre team passing the record held by the Aldwych Theatre team. The Aldwych farces ran for 10 years, seven months and four days, while Rix went on for another 16 years. Rix also had a particularly long and fruitful relationship with the director Wallace Douglas and with the set designer, Rhoda Gray (Elspet's sister), who created the setting for practically all of Rix's productions, both in the theatre and on TV. The Whitehall was particularly small and cramped and Rhoda's designs overcame the most difficult of obstacles.

Rix made a series of films that were distributed by Rank and British Lion.

==== Post-Whitehall (1967–1977) ====
In 1967, Rix moved on to the Garrick Theatre after the Whitehall Theatre lease expired. The larger stage gave him the opportunity to try his repertoire scheme. This was a similar idea to the way plays were presented at the National Theatre – that is several productions, each one being played on different days or weeks, thus giving the actors the chance to play a variety of roles – or even to have a night or two off. Rix tried with three farces – Stand By Your Bedouin, Uproar in the House and Let Sleeping Wives Lie – but as this was a commercial venture, without any state subsidy, it proved too expensive to run and Rix was forced to keep Let Sleeping Wives Lie on at the Garrick and transfer Uproar in the House, with Nicholas Parsons playing Rix's role, to the Whitehall. Stand By Your Bedouin went into storage. Let Sleeping Wives Lie enjoyed a further two-year run with Leslie Crowther, Elspet Gray, Derek Farr, Andrew Sachs and Rix playing the lead roles. After the first year, Rona Anderson took over from Gray.

After Let Sleeping Wives Lie finished at the Garrick, it went on a short tour before opening for a summer season at the newly restored Playhouse in Weston-super-Mare. Rix played the first four weeks and then Leslie Crowther returned and played the last six. Meantime the cast of Rix's next West End production commuted by train every day to rehearse in London, returning in the late afternoon for their evening performance. She's Done It Again, opened at the Garrick to the best reviews Rix had ever enjoyed, but it had the shortest run of any of his productions to that date. Rix could never find an obvious reason for the production's short run, for the play enjoyed a sell-out tour after the Garrick. His favoured explanation was that the play, funny as it was, might have seemed somewhat old-fashioned, as it was adapted by Michael Pertwee from a pre-war farce, Nap Hand, by Vernon Sylvaine and based upon the birth of Dionne quintuplets.

Rix's next play, also by Pertwee, was Don't Just Lie There, Say Something! with Alfred Marks (followed by Moray Watson) playing the libidinous government minister. Reviews were not as good as the previous play, but audiences kept coming and it ran for two years at the Garrick and then enjoyed another successful tour. Rix, who had never enjoyed touring, now hated the endless nights away from home, and was delighted when the play was turned first into a television series for HTV, Men of Affairs (with Warren Mitchell as the minister) and then into a film (starring himself, Leslie Phillips and Joanna Lumley). After that, during the Three-Day Week in 1973–74, came a relatively unsuccessful pantomime season in Robinson Crusoe at the New Theatre, Cardiff.

Rix was by now becoming tired of going on stage night after night, and sensing that he had reached the peak of his success, began to consider retiring from the stage. However, he performed in two more farces, A Bit Between the Teeth (with Jimmy Logan and Terence Alexander) at the Cambridge Theatre and then, back at the Whitehall, Fringe Benefits (with Terence Alexander and Jane Downs). After 26 years of almost continuous performance in the West End, on 8 January 1977, Rix gave his final performance to a packed house at the Whitehall Theatre.

=== Later management career ===
Having retired from performing, Rix joined Cooney-Marsh Ltd – a theatre-owning and production company – run by Ray Cooney, Laurie Marsh and Rix himself. Ably assisted by his former stage manager and now PA, Joanne Benjamin, Rix was responsible for obtaining productions for various West End theatres including the Shaftesbury, the Duke of York's, the Ambassadors and the re-built Astoria which opened with the award-winning Elvis, starring P. J. Proby, Shakin' Stevens and Tim Whitnall. Rix and his partners were also responsible for re-opening the Billy Rose Theatre in New York City, renaming it the Trafalgar and opening with a big hit – Whose Life Is It Anyway?, starring Tom Conti. Whilst in this post, he also presented (with his daughter, Louisa) the BBC Television series Let's Go. This was the first British programme to be created specifically for people with a learning disability, and ran from 1978 until 1982.

Rix found being on the other side of the footlights increasingly frustrating, and in 1980 he became the Secretary-General of the National Society for Mentally Handicapped Children and Adults (shortly to become the Royal Society, later Mencap). He returned to performing and the stage intermittently in later years, playing Shakespeare on BBC Radio, doing a six-month run in a revival of Dry Rot, directing a play with Cannon and Ball, playing his favourite big band jazz on BBC Radio 2, and touring three one-night-only shows, one with his wife, which explored theatrical history and his own remarkable experiences of life.

=== Arts Council (1986–1993) ===
From 1986 to 1993, Rix served as chairman of the Arts Council of Great Britain's Drama Panel. He was also an active chair of the Arts Council Disability Committee raising the profile and perceived importance of arts and disability issues within Arts Council decision-making. In these roles he proved dynamic and progressive.

When Rix took office the Drama Panel was male-dominated, but by 1993 there was gender parity on the panel – paradoxically his female successor unbalanced it once more, again in favour of men. He achieved a significant shift in funding priorities; while maintaining support for national and regional building-based theatre companies, he actively supported the work of small-scale experimental touring companies – including theatre for young people and for the black and minority ethnic communities – and new writing projects.

His approach meant he was able to cut through bureaucratic constraints. Before Rix's first budget-setting exercise for the Drama Panel (when what was available for all companies was a less than inflation uplift) panel members and other members of the Arts Council had intended to fund the British-Asian theatre company Tara Arts, but no-one had been able to source the sum required. Rix however boldly proposed that the biggest national companies were stood still, so releasing money not only to fund Tara, but also allow fresh small-scale developments, and then saw that this was delivered through Panel and Council. Such willingness to take on the establishment marked his term of office. A constant champion of the interests of drama companies and theatre-workers, Rix's seven-year term of office meant that, even in a period of Thatcherite public-funding stringency, no theatre building for which he had responsibility was closed while the West Yorkshire Playhouse in Leeds was able to open (succeeding the Leeds Playhouse) with vastly increased capacity. Meanwhile, the number of touring companies, which had been falling before his arrival, increased from 22 to 33.

In 1993 at a retreat at Woodstock, the Council agreed that the Drama budget should be disproportionately reduced in the face of across-the-board cuts to the Council's budget and the money allocated to other less popular art forms. In the absence of specialist arts officers at the meeting, Rix was left isolated and he resigned as a matter of principle. This created a negative public reaction and shocked senior Council figures into realising their decision was unacceptable. After a campaign, led behind scenes by his Drama Director Ian Brown and publicly by Drama Panel members, the disproportionate cut was rescinded.

=== Campaigner ===
Rix and his wife, Elspet became involved in the world of learning disability, when in December 1951 the first of their four children was born. Their daughter, Shelley, was diagnosed with Down syndrome. There was no welfare support for the children affected and little education. The only offering the state made was a place in a Victorian era, run-down hospital where patients were left to their own devices for hours at a time. The Rixes were determined to improve the situation and became involved with charities campaigning on the issue. Among these roles, in the early 1960s, Rix became the first Chairman of the Special Functions Fundraising committee at the National Society for Mentally Handicapped Children and Adults, later known as Mencap. Both his personal experience and his leading position as a fundraiser in the field finally led to Rix applying for the job at Mencap and then when he retired in 1987 to him becoming chairman in 1988. In 1998, he became president, an office he held until he died.

==== House of Lords ====
Entering the House of Lords as a crossbencher in 1992, Rix campaigned ceaselessly on any legislation affecting people with a learning disability. He was one of the most regular attenders in the House and every year introduced numerous amendments to legislation, mainly that associated with health, social welfare and education. He found the length of time required to change legislation very frustrating. One example in 1994 was when Rix introduced a private member's bill ensuring that local authorities would provide short-term breaks for carers and cared-for alike, on a reasonably timed basis. The bill easily passed through the Lords, but could not even achieve a first reading in the House of Commons.

Rix tried again when New Labour became the government in 1997, but again to no avail. Eventually, 12 years after Rix's private member's bill, short-term breaks sneaked through in an Education Bill, introduced by the then Secretary of State for Children, Schools and Families, Ed Balls. The extent of his involvement can be seen by looking at the some of other legislation altered in the same year as the Education Bill (2006). His amendments to the Childcare Bill extended statutory childcare provision for children with a disability from 16 to 18 years old, whilst changes to the Electoral Administration Bill lead to people with a learning disability being able to vote freely.

Rix discovered in the mid-1990s that the legislation regarding State Earnings-Related Pension Scheme (SERPS) had been altered under Margaret Thatcher. The original act had ensured that widows and widowers would receive the full SERPS addition to their state pension if their spouse died first. The change in legislation halved the amount received. Rix campaigned to restore the original payment and after a number of years arguing the point with the New Labour Government, he succeeded.

==== Affiliated groups ====
Amongst his many activities, he was the co-chairman (with Tom Clarke CBE MP) of the All Party Parliamentary Group on Learning Disability; chairman of the Rix Thompson Rothenberg (RTR) Foundation which provides small grants for projects serving people with a learning disability; and president of the grant making Normansfield and Richmond Foundation. He was also a constant supporter of the Rix Centre at the University of East London, which develops and disseminates tools and training for multi-media advocacy to enhance the lives of people with a learning disability. Rix also served as the first chairman of the Arts Council Monitoring Committee on Arts and Disability as well as founding and chairing the charity Libertas (working alongside Sir John Cox and Rix's son, Jonathan) which produced dozens of audio guides for disabled people at museums, historical buildings and other places of interest. Subsequent legislation in which he played an important role made this charity redundant.

He was involved as chairman and president of Friends of Normansfield, President of the Roy Kinnear Memorial Trust, chairman and founder (with Dr David Towell of the King's Fund) of the Independent Council for People with a Mental Handicap and was patron of RAIBC – the charity working for radio amateurs with disabilities. Rix also campaigned against smoking; having been a smoker for ten years, Rix gave up smoking on Boxing Day in 1950 when he lost his voice during a matinee of Reluctant Heroes. He subsequently became a passionate non-smoker and a founding member of Action on Smoking and Health (ASH).

=== Personal life ===
In 1949 he married the actress Elspet Gray. The couple had four children, including Shelley Rix, Jamie Rix and Louisa Rix. Elspet Gray died on 18 February 2013.

Rix became a radio ham at the age of 13 and became a life vice-president of the Radio Society of Great Britain in 1979. His call sign was G2DQU. He was also president of the Friends of Richmond Park. In 1970 he was President of the Lord's Taverners and he continued his love of cricket as a member of the MCC and Yorkshire CCC. Rix was the subject of This Is Your Life on two occasions, in October 1961 when he was surprised by Eamonn Andrews at a friend's house in Surrey, and again in April 1977, when Andrews surprised him at Her Majesty's Theatre in London. He was also a castaway on Desert Island Discs on two occasions. The first was with Roy Plomley on 16 May 1960, which was also the first time a castaway was caught on film and broadcast the following evening. His second appearance was with Kirsty Young on 1 March 2009.

In August 2016, Rix announced that he was terminally ill, and called for the legalisation of voluntary euthanasia for those dying in severe pain. This was a significant departure from his previous position; in 2006 he had voted against the Assisted Dying Bill. He died on 20 August 2016 at Denville Hall in Northwood, London.

=== Honours and awards ===
Rix was appointed a Commander of the Order of the British Empire (CBE) in the 1977 Birthday Honours, and knighted in June 1986 for his services to charity. On his 68th birthday, 27 January 1992, he was created a life peer, becoming Baron Rix of Whitehall in the City of Westminster and of Hornsea in Yorkshire. He was Vice Lord Lieutenant of Greater London from 1987 to 1997 and was the first chancellor of the University of East London from 1997 to 2012. He was subsequently the chancellor emeritus.

He was awarded ten honorary degrees by the following universities: Hull (MA 1981), Open (MA 1983), Essex (MA 1984), Nottingham (DSc 1987), Exeter (LL.D. 1997), Bradford (DU 2000), Kingston (DLitt 2012), East London (D.A. 2013) and five fellowships, including the Royal Society of Medicine (FRSM) and the Royal College of Psychiatrists (FRCPsych) as well as receiving an Honorary College Fellowship of Myerscough College

He has also received numerous awards including: The Evian Health Award (1988), Royal National Institute for Deaf People Campaigner of the Year Award (1990), The Spectator Campaigner of the Year Award (1999), Yorkshire Society – Yorkshire Lifetime Achievement Award (1999), UK Charity Awards (2001), Lifetime Achievement Award for Public Service – British Neuroscience Association (2001) and the ePolitix Charity Champions Lifetime Achievement Award (2004).

Coat of arms of Brian Rix

Crest
The upper part of a ship's wheel Or, standing thereon an avocet wings elevated Proper, gorged with a cronal studded Gold, pendant therefrom a cross crosslet fitchy Sable.
Escutcheon
Per chevron double arched points upwards Gules and Or, in chief a rose Argent between two suns in splendour also Or and in base chevronwise a Greek mask of comedy Vert and a like mask of tragedy sable.
Supporters
On either side a labrador dog Or, the compartment comprising a grassy mount Proper, growing therefrom roses Argent barbed and seeded Proper, slipped and leaved Vert.
Motto
Tolerate Labores

== Artistic credits ==
=== Theatrical performances ===
	Whitehall Theatre
1950–54	Reluctant Heroes (1,610 performances)
1954–58	Dry Rot (1,475 performances)
1958–61	Simple Spymen (1,403 performances)
1961–64	One For the Pot (1,210 performances)
1964–66	Chase Me, Comrade (765 performances)
	On tour
1966–67	Chase Me, Comrade; Stand By Your Bedouin; Uproar in the House
	Garrick Theatre
1967–69	Let Sleeping Wives Lie
1969	She's Done It Again
1971–73	Don't Just Lie There, Say Something
	Cambridge Theatre (+ extended tour)
1974–76	A Bit Between the Teeth
	Whitehall Theatre
1976–77	Fringe Benefits
	Lyric Theatre
1988–89	Dry Rot
	Occasional one night stands
1994–2012	Tour de Farce; Life in the Farce Lane; A Peer Round Whitehall

=== Television ===
90 full length and one act plays for the BBC. More than 30 were live.

	BBC Sunday-Night Theatre; Laughter from the Whitehall; Dial Rix; Brian Rix presents...; Six of Rix
1952	Reluctant Heroes (Act 1); Postman's Knock
1954	Dry Rot (Act 1)
1956	Love in a Mist; The Perfect Woman; Madame Louise; Queen Elizabeth Slept Here; Reluctant Heroes
1957	You Too Can Have a Body; Jane Steps Out; Plunder; What the Doctor Ordered; Thark
1958	On Monday Next...; Nothing But the Truth; Wanted, One Body; Cuckoo in the Nest; Simple Spymen (Act 1)
1959	A Policeman's Lot; Nap Hand; Beside the Seaside; Sleeping Partnership; A Cup of Kindness
1960	Is your Honeymoon Really Necessary?; Doctor in the House; Reluctant Heroes; Boobs in the Wood
1961	A Fair Cop; Wolf's Clothing; Basinful of the Briny; Flat Spin; Will Any Gentleman?
1962	One for the Pot (Act 1); A Clear Case; See How They Run; Between the Balance Sheets; What a Drag; Round the Bend; Nose to Wheel; No Plums in the Pudding
1963	Come Prancing (18 million viewers); Love's a Luxury; Caught Napping; Skin Deep; Rolling Home; What a Chassis; High Temperature
1964	Trial and Error; All for Mary; One Wild Oat; Chase Me Comrade! (Act 1); Dry Rot; Simple Spymen; This year they also started repeats
1965	Don't Just Stand There; Rookery Nook; The Brides of March; Women Aren't Angels
1966	The Dickie Henderson Show; To Dorothy, a Son; Good Old Summertime; The Little Hut; One for the Pot
1967	Look After Lulu; Stand By Your Bedouin (Act 1); Is Your Honeymoon Really Necessary?; Uproar in the House (Act 1); Money for Jam; Chase Me Comrade
1968	One for the Pot; Let Sleeping Wives Lie; Keep Your Wig On; A Bit on the Side; A Public Mischief
1969	What an Exhibition; Two on the Tiles; Sitting Ducks; The Facts of Life; Odd Man In
1970	Let Sleeping Wives Lie; Clutterbuck; Lord Arthur Savile's Crime; So You Think You're a Good Wife?; Stand By Your Bedouin!
1971	Reluctant Heroes; She's Done It Again!
1972	What the Doctor Ordered; Will Any Gentleman?; One Wild Oat; Aren't Men Beasts!; A Spot of Bother; Madame Louise
	ITV
1973–74	Men of Affairs (17 episodes – 13 broadcast): May We Have Our Ball Back?; Brick Dropp'ing; Passes That Ship; Half a Dozen of the Other; Well I'm Burgled; Horseface; Near Miss; To Russia With...; Dash My Wig; Desirable Residence; Flagrant Memories; Arabian Knights; Silver Threads; A Fair Cop; ...As a New Born Babe; Dinner for One; It's a Bug!
	BBC
1977	A Roof Over My Head (8 episodes) A Roof Over My Head; First, Find Your House; Take Me to Your Solicitor; The Sitting Tenant; Learn to Dread One Day at a Time; Not Cricket; Another Fine Mess; Home and Dried
1978–83	Let's Go (42 episodes)

=== Films ===
1951	Reluctant Heroes
1954	What Every Woman Wants; The Passing Stranger
1955	Up to His Neck
1956	Dry Rot
1957	Not Wanted on Voyage
1960	And the Same to You
1961	Nothing Barred; The Night We Dropped a Clanger; The Night We Got the Bird;
1974	Don't Just Lie There, Say Something!

=== Radio ===
1963	Yule Be Surprised
1964	One Man's Meat (15 episodes)
1967	Souvenir
1968	Radio series – Brian Rix says That's Life
1971	Radio play- For Love of a Lady
1978–79	Brian Rix – Sunday mornings – Radio 2
1982	Falstaff in Henry IV (pt1); Josiah Bounderby in Hard Times

=== Books ===
Rix was the author of two autobiographies, My Farce From My Elbow (1974) and Farce About Face (1989), and two theatre histories, Tour de Farce and Life in the Farce Lane. He also edited, compiled and contributed to Gullible's Travails, an anthology of travel stories by famous people for the Mencap Blue Sky Appeal. For Mencap's 60th anniversary he produced All About Us! – The history of learning disability and of the Royal Mencap Society.

1975	My Farce from My Elbow
1989	Farce About Face
1992	Tour de Farce: A Tale of Touring Theatres and Strolling Players (from Thespis to Branagh)
1995	Life in the Farce Lane
1996	Gullible's Travails (ed)
2006	All About Us! The story of people with a learning disability and Mencap

Academic offices
New post	Chancellor of University of East London; 1997–2012	Succeeded by Gulam Noon, Baron Noon
