= J.R. Rix & Sons Ltd =

J.R. Rix & Sons Ltd is a family-owned British business that is headquartered in Hull, East Riding of Yorkshire. The roots of the company date back to 1873 when founder Robert Rix, the son of a Norfolk farmer, established a ship building business in Teesside, which he subsequently moved to Hull in 1883.

Today J.R. Rix & Sons Ltd is involved in a large range of activities ranging from commercial, residential and marine fuel distribution, fuel cards, ship owning, stevedoring, warehousing and offshore wind farm support to holiday home manufacturing, car retail and property, through a number of subsidiaries of which the largest is Rix Petroleum Ltd.

Others include Rix Heating Services; Rix Shipping; Rix Sea Shuttle; Maritime Bunkering; Rix Shipping (Scotland) Ltd; Jordans Cars; Rix Truck Services; Fuelmate, and; Victory Leisure Homes.

In 2014 the company was ranked 30th in the Sunday Times’ Top Track 250. The current chairman of J.R. Rix & Sons Ltd, Tim Rix CBE, is the great-great-grandson of founder Robert and was awarded the CBE in the 2018 Honours List for services to the economy and regeneration on the Humber region.

== Early years ==
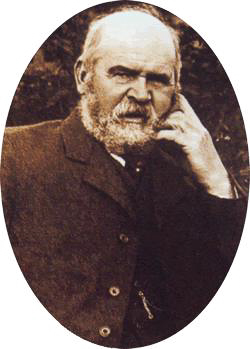
Robert Rix

Robert Rix was born in March 1841 into a farming family in Burnham Overy, Norfolk, and at age 10 was sent to work on the land. However, he did not take to the work and within two years had run away to sea. He joined a small sailing coaster on the Tees and his early career was spent trading with northern Scottish ports down to South Wales and later the near Continent.

He settled in Stockton-on-Tees in the North East of England and in 1862 married Margaret Dobson. It was while living here that he first established a shipbuilding company on the south bank of the Tees while at the same time continuing to work as a captain. The couple produced seven children and moved to Hull in 1883 where Robert continued his business.

Robert was joined in the business by his three sons, John Robert (Bob), Ernest Bertie (Bert) and Herbert Dobson (Herbie), and continued to expand his fleet with the addition of several steamers. In 1908 he came ashore to manage the business from the office.

=== 1914–1918 ===
Due to an increased demand for freight tonnage during the Great War, Robert Rix & Sons increased revenue and profit throughout the period and invested in a ship building programme to modernise its fleet. The company also offloaded a number of older steamers which were fetching higher prices than in peacetime. In 1916 and 1917 Robert Rix & Sons took delivery of two pairs of steamships from Cochrane & Sons Ltd in Selby, which for the first time bore the family name. These were the Magrix, the Robrix, and Jarrix and the Ebbrix and they set the precedent by which all Rix ships would be named from then on.

=== 1920s – 1950s ===
The early 1920s were a difficult period for ship owners due to the depressed economic conditions and the increasing popularity of rail freight, but Robert Rix & Sons continued to grow its fleet with the addition of six ships, many of which were used to work the east coast coal trading routes.

In November 1925 Robert Rix died following a cerebral haemorrhage, aged 84. He had worked right up to his death, leaving the office the day before along with the rest of the staff.

In 1927 the roots of the largest company in the J.R. Rix & Sons group, Rix Petroleum Ltd, were established when Robert Rix & Sons began importing Tractor vaporising oil to the UK to fuel the post-war agricultural revolution. The company also carried lamp oil from Russia to the Humber on Rix ships. This led to such an expansion that by 1939 the company owned 11 ships spread across four companies.

=== 1939 – 1947 ===
Freight rates increased again before the Second World War which meant the value of elderly steam coasters rose and Robert Rix & Sons sold a number of vessels. The company also lost two ships during the war; one, the Malrix hit a mine off Southend in December 1940 and the Pegrix sank off the Norfolk coast after colliding with Coast Line's Normandy Coast.

The company helped the war effort directly in several ways. The Ebbrix was taken for special duties on the east coast of Scotland as part of the invasion of Europe and Kenrix's master, Capt. George Simison, was awarded the Atlantic Star medal for his participation in the Normandy Landings.

During the war years the shipping companies were run by Robert Kenneth Rix (Ken) and the petroleum business by John Leslie Rix (Les), both sons of Bob Rix. After the war, however, Malcolm and Geoffrey Rix, sons of Bert and Herbie respectively, both expressed an interest in joining the firm.

Bob felt the company was not big enough to support the extra family members and it was finally decided that the partnership should be dissolved. Bert and Herbie became equal partners in Robert Rix & Sons and Bob, Ken and Les left to establish J.R. Rix & Sons.

J.R. Rix & Sons started life in January 1947 with a working capital of £7,000 and one motor ship, the Magrix, in offices in the Bank of England Chambers, Whitefriargate, Hull, but did not become a limited company until 14 February 1957. In the meantime, several Rix companies still in existence today were established including Rix Shipping Co Ltd (Rix Shipping), formed in March 1950, and Rix Shipping (Scotland) Ltd, formerly Piggins Rix Ltd, based in Montrose, Scotland.

Piggins Rix Ltd grew out of Rix Limes Ltd which had been established to supply limestone mined in quarries in the East Riding of Yorkshire to the Scottish agricultural market. The lime was transported by sea from Hull to Montrose on Rix ships where it was discharged by J.M. Piggins Ltd. J.R. Rix & Sons bought the company – its first owned interest in Scotland – and renamed it Piggins Rix Ltd. A short time later Rix Petroleum established a fuel depot there to serve the offshore industry and its growing domestic, agricultural and haulage customers.

Piggins Rix Ltd was renamed Rix Shipping (Scotland) Ltd in January 2013.

== Rix Shipping Ltd ==
Rix Shipping was formed on 23 March 1950, making it is the oldest company in the J.R. Rix & Sons Ltd group, however it did not become a limited company until 14 February 1957. It started out with a single ship, Magrix (2) but the company soon acquired two further vessels: Roxton, from Middlesbrough owners, and a ship bought from Swedish owners which the company renamed as the Jarrix (2).

Rix Shipping Ltd established regular voyages for coal from Amble, Blyth and Goole for Teignmouth, Exmouth, Hayle, Penryn, Falmouth and Penzance, with back cargoes of china clay and stone chippings. Another regular cargo was sulphate of ammonia from the Tyne or Tees bound for Ipswich and Avonmouth and in 1958 Rix Shipping Ltd began carrying agricultural limestone from Whitby to North Eastern Scottish ports as well as chalk, mined from Little Weighton in the East Riding of Yorkshire, from Hull.

Over the years the company continued to expand its fleet by both buying ships and commissioning new vessels to be built until by the early sixties it had four motor ships all under five years old. This enabled the business to trade with near continental ports as well as those in the Baltic and Bay of Biscay. Regular return cargoes included seasonal crops, including French onion sellers who, complete with bikes, were carried in the ship's hold with the onions.

Today Rix Shipping Ltd is based at the head office of parent firm, J.R. Rix & Sons Ltd, in Spyvee Street, Hull, and owns and operates a fleet of estuarial tank barges, coastal tankers and high speed crew transfer workboats. Its main business activities include carriage of petroleum products, carriage of engineers to maintain wind turbines and stevedoring services through Hull's King George Dock and Montrose in Scotland.

Rix Shipping Ltd also owns 25 acres of secure storage and warehousing space close to King George Dock in the east of the city and significant areas of land and warehousing in Montrose.

== Rix Petroleum Ltd ==
Rix Petroleum Ltd is the largest subsidiary of J.R. Rix & Sons Ltd which turned over £425.4 million in 2011. It is headquartered in Hull but has depots across the UK, from Aberdeen down to Coleshill in the West Midlands.

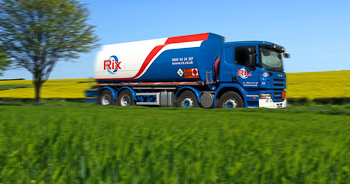
A Rix fuel tanker

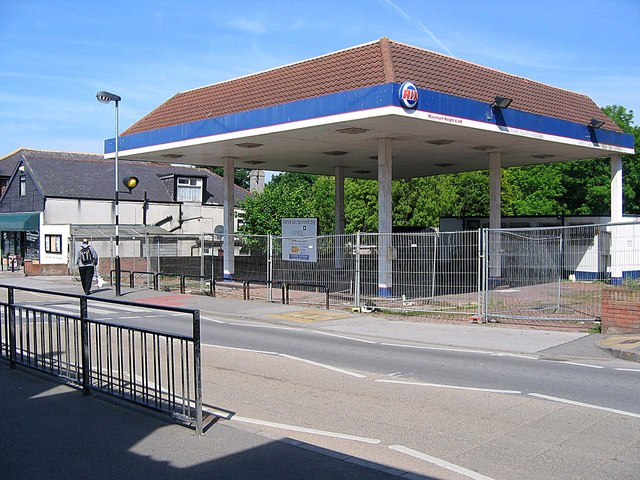
A now closed Rix filling station in Hornsea, East Riding of Yorkshire.

The roots of Rix Petroleum go back to 1927 when Robert Rix & Sons began importing tractor vaporising oil and lamp oil from Russia to supply local garages. The war years saw the business expand and supply commercial diesel customers in the East Riding of Yorkshire and the road transport industry. Domestic customers also provided an opportunity for the business as many households converted to cheaper, oil-fired central heating and the agricultural sector opened up as farmers turned from horses to tractors.

The company was incorporated in June 1956 operates a fleet of more than 100 tankers in the UK serving agriculture and agribusiness, hauliers and other fleet-vehicle operators and the residential heating oil market customers.

Its red, white and blue logo has remained relatively unchanged for many decades and is a common sight on tankers, particularly around Yorkshire, but also in other regions where the business operates.

== Maritime Bunkering Ltd ==
The demand for marine fuel also spawned another Rix company, Maritime Bunkering Ltd, which supplies marine fuels to vessels on the Humber Estuary.

== Jordan & Co (Hull) Ltd ==
Jordan & Co (Hull) Ltd is a car dealership based in Witham, close to central Hull that is well known locally as a Rix-owned business. The business was established in the early 1900s as a bicycle retailer based on High Street in Hull City Centre. In the 1920s it progressed to selling motorcycles and in the 1950s became a car retailer.

In 1960 the roots of the modern day business were laid down after Rix Petroleum acquired the Jubilee filling station on Holderness Road in the city, which was also the site of a BMC car dealership. The location became the site of Jordans & Co (Hull) Ltd, where it remains to this day. Over time BMC vehicles lost out to more reliable Japanese brands and therefore the company began selling Datsun, which later became Nissan.

Jordans, as it is known locally, was recently the subject of a £300,000 investment in its showroom facilities to become the UK's first ever Fiat "super centre".

== Hepworth Shipyard Ltd ==
In 1977 J.R. Rix & Sons Ltd bought the Paull-based shipbuilder J.R. Hepworth & Co (Hull) Ltd and a formed new company, Hepworth Shipyard Ltd, which built small craft such as trawlers and tugs at its location on the north bank of the Humber. The yard successfully continued shipbuilding until 2012 and was for many years the last remaining shipbuilder on the Humber as all other yards had turned to repairs only. But after completing the 53m long Lerrix for Rix Shipping Ltd the Hepworth Shipyard Ltd company was closed and formally dissolved on 18 December 2018. The premises were let to Dunston (Shipbuilders) Ltd, a new company dedicated to making aluminium boats for the wind farm industry.

== Fuelmate Ltd ==
Along with its core services of supplying commercial diesel and residential heating oil, Rix Petroleum also provided UK fuel cards to help its customers manage their fuel costs effectively. However, as demand for fuel cards increased, J.R. Rix & Sons Ltd decided to create a specialist fuel card supplier to complement the services of Rix Petroleum; in 2008 it launched Fuelmate Ltd.

== Victory Leisure Homes Ltd ==
Victory Leisure Homes Ltd is a holiday home and lodge manufacturer established by J.R. Rix & Sons in April 2009, after the demise of Cosalt Holiday Homes in the previous year. Cosalt had occupied land adjacent to Rix Road Industrial Estate, a 12-acre site owned by Rix on Stoneferry in the east of Hull; when it ceased trading Rix decided to buy the factory, land and plant to create its own caravan and lodge manufacturing facility and increase the size of its land holding in the area to 20 acres.

Three years after being founded the business outgrew its initial base and moved to a modern manufacturing plant in Gilberdyke, East Riding of Yorkshire, around 20 miles west of Hull city centre, the former home of modular buildings maker Britspace, which went into administration in 2011.

== Rix Sea Shuttle Ltd ==
Rix Sea Shuttle is the most recently established business in the J.R. Rix & Sons group. It was founded in 2012 to provide high speed crew transfer boats for wind farm personnel and equipment from the east coast of the UK to offshore wind farms in the North Sea.

The business was created in response to the burgeoning renewables industry, particularly offshore wind farms, much of which is centred round the Humber Ports complex of Hull, Immingham and Grimsby.

Rix Sea Shuttle owns five specially constructed wind farm work boats built in Blyth, Northumberland, and in Paull on the north bank of the Humber Estuary. The company planned to increase the size of its fleet by 2015.
