= 1957 in British television =

This is a list of British television related events from 1957.

== Events ==
=== January ===
- 9 January – The 1956 BBC Sportsview Personality of the Year takes place and is won by cricketer Jim Laker. It is the only time to date the event has not taken place in the year itself.

=== February ===
- 16 February – The "Toddlers' Truce" (an arrangement whereby there were no television broadcasts between 6pm and 7pm, to allow parents to put their children to bed) is abolished – it has been a major stumbling block to the success of ITV. The BBC immediately fills the slot on Saturdays with a five-minute news bulletin and Six-Five Special, which pioneers the presentation of rock and roll on television.
- 18 February - First edition of Tonight on BBC Television, presented by Cliff Michelmore, and being broadcast live on weekday evenings. It is shown on the former "Toddlers' Truce" slot.
- 19 February – ITV begins showing medical soap opera Emergency Ward 10 made by ATV; it will run continuously two evenings a week until 1967.
- 20 February – The American live action comic book series Adventures of Superman debuts on ITV, starring George Reeves as Superman.

=== March ===
- 3 March – The United Kingdom enters the Eurovision Song Contest (staged this year in Frankfurt) for the first time, with the song "All", performed by Patricia Bredin. The United Kingdom finishes in seventh place.

=== April ===
- 1 April – British current affairs programme Panorama broadcasts a Spaghetti tree hoax report.
- 20 April – The American comedy series The Phil Silvers Show debuts on the BBC.
- 21 April – The historical documentary series Men, Women and Clothes begins airing on the BBC. It is the first BBC programme filmed in colour, although it can only be transmitted in black and white.
- 24 April – The Sky at Night is shown for the first time, presented by Patrick Moore. It continues to air with Moore as presenter until his death in December 2012.

=== June ===
- 2 June – BBC Television broadcasts the final of the 1957 European Amateur Boxing Championships live from Prague. For the first time, the BBC broadcasts an event held in a Communist state, which is also relayed to the rest of the Eurovision network in other Western European countries.

=== August ===
- 31 August – Central Scotland's ITV franchise Scottish Television goes on air, the first 7-day-a-week ITV franchise to do so, broadcasting through Black Hill transmitting station. It launches at 5:30 pm with This is Scotland, an hour-long variety broadcast live from its Theatre Royal, Glasgow, studios, introduced by James Robertson Justice.

=== September ===
- 18 September – The sports programme Scotsport begins airing on Scottish Television, although the programme is originally called Sports Desk. By the time it ends in 2008 it is recognised as the world's longest running television sports magazine.
- 24 September – The ITV Schools and BBC Schools services, broadcasting programmes for schools and colleges, both go on air.
- 30 September – The first broadcasts of regional news bulletins take place.

=== December ===
- 3 December – Face to Face debuts on the BBC Television Service.
- 24 December – BBC Television shows the 1946 Christmas film It's a Wonderful Life, starring James Stewart.
- 25 December – The Royal Christmas Message is first televised with Queen Elizabeth II on camera for the first time.

=== Undated ===
- Fry's Turkish Delight chocolate bar begins to be promoted with the slogan "Full of Eastern Promise".

== Debuts ==
=== BBC Television Service/BBC TV ===
- 2 January – Potts and the Phantom Piper (1957)
- 3 January – Our Miss Pemberton (1957–1958)
- 13 January – The Adventures of Peter Simple (1957)
- 17 January – My Pal Bob (1957–1958)
- 8 February – Kenilworth (1957)
- 16 February – Six-Five Special (1957–1958)
- 18 February – Tonight (1957–1965)
- 22 February – On Safari (1957–1965)
- 3 March – The Railway Children (1957)
- 12 March – Uncertain Honours (1957)
- 28 March – The Wharf Road Mob (1957)
- 9 April – Portraits of Power (1957–1958)
- 17 April – Lenny the Lion Show (1957–1960)
- 20 April – The Phil Silvers Show (1955–1959)
- 24 April – The Sky at Night (1957–present)
- 25 April – Alma Cogan Show (1957; 1962)
- 30 April – Sara Crewe (1957)
- 6 May – Drake's Progress (1957–1958)
- 12 May – The Kilt Is My Delight (1957–1963)
- 19 May – The Machine Breakers (1957)
- 29 May –Precious Bane (1957)
- 2 June – From Me to You (1957)
- 13 June – Sheep's Clothing (1957)
- 16 June – Huntingtower (1957)
- 22 July – Scott Free (1957)
- 27 July – Escape (1957)
- 28 July – A Tale of Two Cities (1957)
- 8 August – The Orange Orchard (1957)
- 4 September – Mister Charlesworth (1957)
- 2 October – Educated Evans (1957–1958)
- 12 October – Thunder in the West (1957)
- 16 October – The Royalty (1957–1958)
- 18 October – Nicholas Nickelby (1957)
- 25 October – Be Soon (1957)
- 13 November – A Time of Day (1957)
- 24 November – The Silver Sword (1957)
- 7 December
  - Angel Pavement (1957–1958)
  - Caxton's Tales (1957–1958)
- 15 December – The Trial of Mary Lafarge (1957)
- 31 December – Onion Boys
- Unknown
  - Captain Pugwash (BBC 1957–1966; 1974–1975, ITV 1997–2002)
  - Pinky and Perky (1957–1968)

=== ITV ===
- 2 January
  - The Adventures of Long John Silver (1954–1955)
  - The Arthur Haynes Show (1957–1966)
- 5 January – The Adventures of Sir Lancelot (1956–1957)
- 7 January – Alfred Hitchcock Presents (1955–1965)
- 9 January – The Carroll Levis Show (1957–1960)
- 17 January – A Date with Don (1957–1958)
- 24 January – Wyatt Earp (1955–1961)
- 26 January – The Man Who Was Two (1957)
- 11 February – Yes, It's the Cathode-Ray Tube Show! (1957)
- 15 February – The Cisco Kid (1950–1956)
- 18 February – Outlook on... (1957)
- 19 February –
  - Make Way for Tomorrow (1957)
  - The Adventures of Long John Silver (1954–1955)
  - Emergency-Ward 10 (1957–1967)
- 20 February –
  - The Adventures of Superman (1953–1958)
  - Youth Wants to Know (1957–1958)
- 21 February – Answers Please! (1957–1958)
- 9 March – The Gentle Killers (1957)
- 14 March – Jim's Inn (1957–1963)
- 19 March –
  - Bury the Hatchet (1957)
  - Roving Report (1957–1964)
- 25 March –
  - Captain David Grief (1956–1957)
  - Destination–Downing Street (1957)
  - Cooper or Life with Tommy (1957)
- 26 March – Soldiers of Fortune (1956–1957)
- 4 April – The Adventures of Superman (1953–1958)
- 5 April –
  - Cross Talk (1957)
  - Together Again (1957)
- 12 April – Living It Up (1957–1958)
- 20 April – Electrode 93 (1957)
- 22 April – Walt Disney Presents (1957–1965)
- 25 April – Hawkeye and the Last of the Mohicans (1957)
- 27 April – The Joe Loss Show (1957)
- 20 May – The Gay Cavalier (1957)
- 15 June
  - Hour of Mystery (1957)
  - Motive for Murder (1957)
  - Overseas Press Club – Exclusive! (1957)
- 17 June –
  - Criss Cross Quiz (1957–1967)
  - Shadow Squad (1957–1959)
- 18 June – Tell the Truth (1957-196?)
- 19 June – The Army Game (1957–1961)
- 12 July – The Gay Cavalier (1957)
- 3 August – The Schirmer Inheritance (1957)
- 5 August – Highland Fling (1957)
- 7 August – Dead Giveaway (1957)
- 9 August – The New Adventures of Charlie Chan (1957–1958)
- 14 September – Five Names for Johnny (1957)
- 16 September – Murder Bag (1957–1958)
- 17 September – Chelsea at Nine (1957–1960)
- 18 September – Out of Step (1957)
- 22 September – O.S.S. (1957–1958)
- 12 October – White Hunter (1957–1959)
- 13 November – The Adventures of Twizzle (1957–1959)
- 21 December – Web (1957)
- Unknown
  - Mark Saber (1955–1960)
  - The Adventures of a Jungle Boy (1957)

==== STV ====
- 18 September – Scotsport (1957–2008)

== Continuing television shows ==
=== 1920s ===
- BBC Wimbledon (1927–1939, 1946–2019, 2021–2024)

=== 1930s ===
- Trooping the Colour (1937–1939, 1946–2019, 2023–present)
- The Boat Race (1938–1939, 1946–2019, 2021–present)
- BBC Cricket (1939, 1946–1999, 2020–2024)

=== 1940s ===
- The Ed Sullivan Show (1948–1971)
- Come Dancing (1949–1998)

=== 1950s ===
- Andy Pandy (1950–1970, 2002–2005)
- What's My Line? (1951–1963)
- Flower Pot Men (1952–1958, 2001–2002)
- All Your Own (1952–1961)
- Watch with Mother (1952–1975)
- Rag, Tag and Bobtail (1953–1965)
- The Good Old Days (1953–1983)
- Panorama (1953–present)
- The Woodentops (1955–1958)
- The Adventures of Robin Hood (1955–1960)
- Picture Book (1955–1965)
- Sunday Night at the London Palladium (1955–1967, 1973–1974)
- Take Your Pick! (1955–1968, 1992–1998)
- Double Your Money (1955–1968)
- Dixon of Dock Green (1955–1976)
- Crackerjack (1955–1970, 1972–1984, 2020–2021)
- Hancock's Half Hour (1956–1961)
- ITV Wimbledon (1956–1968)
- Opportunity Knocks (1956–1978, 1987–1990)
- This Week (1956–1978, 1986–1992)
- Armchair Theatre (1956–1974)
- What the Papers Say (1956–2008)

== Ending this year ==
- The Appleyards (1952–1957)
- The Grove Family (1954–1957)
- The Adventures of Aggie (1956–1957)
- The Tony Hancock Show (1956–1957)
- The Adventures of Sir Lancelot (1956–1957)

== Births ==
- 17 January – Keith Chegwin, presenter (d. 2017)
- 24 January – Ade Edmondson, comic actor
- 27 February – Timothy Spall, actor
- 22 March – Michael Mosley, Indian-born science presenter (d. 2024)
- 5 May – Richard E. Grant, actor
- 11 May – Mike Nesbitt, broadcast journalist and politician
- 4 June – Sue Hodge, actress
- 10 June – Stevie Spring, media executive and businesswoman
- 4 July – Jenny Seagrove, actress
- 9 July – Paul Merton, comic actor and game show participant
- 12 July – Christopher Quinten, actor
- 17 July – Fern Britton, presenter
- 23 July
  - Jo Brand, comedian
  - Quentin Willson, presenter (d. 2025)
- 12 August – Amanda Redman, actress
- 24 August – Stephen Fry, comic actor, presenter and author
- 8 September – Dave Myers, presenter (d. 2024)
- 12 September – Rachel Ward, actress
- 11 October – Dawn French, comic actress
- 24 October – Sarah Greene, presenter
- 26 October – Julie Dawn Cole, actress
- 17 November – Debbie Thrower, presenter
- 30 November – Colin Mochrie, comedian
- 23 December – Trisha Goddard, presenter
- 26 December – Dermot Murnaghan, journalist and presenter (d. 2026)

== Deaths ==
- 7 August – Oliver Hardy, part of Laurel and Hardy, aged 65

== See also ==
- 1957 in British music
- 1957 in the United Kingdom
- List of British films of 1957
