= 1957 in the United Kingdom =

Events from the year 1957 in the United Kingdom.

== Incumbents ==
- Monarch – Elizabeth II
- Prime Minister - Anthony Eden (Conservative) (until 10 January), Harold Macmillan (Conservative) (starting 10 January)

== Events ==
- 1 January – Sexual Offences Act 1956 (a consolidation of the English criminal law) comes into effect.
- 9 January – Resignation of Anthony Eden as Prime Minister due to ill health.
- 10 January – Harold Macmillan succeeds Anthony Eden as Prime Minister through "the customary processes of consultation".
- 16 January
  - Royal Ballet granted a Royal Charter.
  - The Cavern Club opens in Liverpool as a jazz club.
- 24 January – Sunday Express newspaper editor John Junor is called to the Bar of the House of Commons to be reprimanded for contempt of Parliament – the last non-politician to be so called.
- January
  - The first operational Avro Vulcan strategic V bomber enters service with the Royal Air Force, at RAF Waddington in Lincolnshire.
  - National Trust for Scotland agrees to accept the bequest of the islands of St Kilda.
- February – Norwich City Council becomes the first British local authority to install a computer (an Elliott 405).
- 11 February – East Midlands earthquake.
- 16 February – The "Toddlers' Truce" (an arrangement whereby there have been no television broadcasts between 18:00–19:00 to allow parents to put their children to bed) is abolished.
- 22 February – The Queen grants her husband, the Duke of Edinburgh, the style and title of a Prince of the United Kingdom.
- 6 March – The Northern Territories protectorate and British Togoland are annexed to the Crown, which territories together with Ashanti and Gold Coast become Ghana which is independent of the United Kingdom.
- 13 March – The Anglo-Jordanian Treaty of 1948 expires.
- 21 March – Homicide Act amends the common law offence of murder in English law by introducing the partial defences of diminished responsibility and suicide pact, reforming the partial defence of provocation, and largely abolishing the doctrine of constructive malice; it also restricts the application of the death penalty to aggravated murder (creating a new offence of capital murder), allowing commutation of sentence to life imprisonment in other cases. It is no longer a requirement for the Attorney General to prosecute poisoning cases in person.
- 1 April – The BBC's Panorama current affairs programme presented by Richard Dimbleby broadcasts a spaghetti tree hoax report purporting to show spaghetti being harvested in Switzerland, believed to be the first April Fool's Day joke on television.
- 4 April – 1957 Defence White Paper presented by Duncan Sandys, Minister of Defence, introduces major cuts in conventional land and air forces.
- 10 April – Royal Court Theatre (London) premieres John Osborne's The Entertainer with Laurence Olivier in the title role.
- 11 April – The UK Government agrees to allow Singapore its independence.
- 15 April – Suspected serial killer Dr John Bodkin Adams is controversially found not guilty at the Old Bailey after Britain's longest murder trial. Political interference is suspected.
- 20 April – Manchester United retain the Football League First Division title with a 4–0 win over Sunderland.
- 24 April – The first broadcast of BBC Television astronomy series The Sky at Night, presented by Patrick Moore. This will run with him as presenter until his final episode is broadcast on 7 January 2013, one month following his death.
- 2 May – The Hammer Film Productions' The Curse of Frankenstein is released.
- 4 May – Aston Villa win the FA Cup for a record seventh time with a 2–1 win over Football League First Division champions Manchester United at Wembley Stadium. Peter McParland scores both of Villa's goals with United's consolation goal coming from Tommy Taylor. The result ends Manchester United's hopes of becoming the first team this century to win the double of the league title and FA Cup.
- 14 May – The end of petrol rationing following the Suez Crisis.
- 15 May
  - Operation Grapple: Britain tests its first hydrogen bomb at Malden Island in the Pacific Ocean.
  - Stanley Matthews plays his final international football game, ending an English record international career of almost 23 years.
- 21 May – Project E: agreement for the United States to supply Thor intermediate-range ballistic missiles to Britain under US control.
- 1 June – The first Premium Bond winners are selected by the computer ERNIE.
- 3 June – The actor and playwright Noël Coward returns to Britain from the West Indies amid criticism that he is living abroad to avoid having to pay tax.
- 13 June – Eight people are killed in Oxford Street, London after a bus on route 7 collides with a queue of people at a bus stop.
- 26 June – Six miners are killed in Barnburgh Main Colliery after an underground explosion.
- 27 June – A report by the Medical Research Council reveals that there is evidence to support a link between tobacco smoking and lung cancer.
- Late June – The 1957–1958 influenza pandemic ("Asian flu") which has already killed thousands of people worldwide, reaches Britain where it will kill a number estimated at between 20,000 and 33,000.
- 6 July – Future members of The Beatles John Lennon and Paul McCartney first meet as teenagers at a garden fête at St. Peter's Church, Woolton, Liverpool at which Lennon's skiffle group The Quarrymen is playing.
- 20 July
  - Prime Minister Harold Macmillan makes a speech to his fellow Conservative Party members at Bedford, telling them that "most of our people have never had it so good".
  - Civic Trust (England), founded by Duncan Sandys to promote improvement of the built environment, holds its inaugural conference in London.
  - Stirling Moss finishes the British Grand Prix at Aintree in first position in a Vanwall VW5, the first World Championship victory for a British car.
- 20–28 July – The Transport and General Workers' Union stages a national strike by provincial (non-municipal) bus crews; some violence against non-strikers is reported.
- 31 July – The Tryweryn Bill, permitting Liverpool City Council to build a reservoir which will drown the village of Capel Celyn, becomes law. Every Welsh MP votes against (or, in one case, abstains).
- 5 August – The cartoon character Andy Capp first appears in northern editions of the Daily Mirror.
- 31 August
  - The Federation of Malaya becomes independent from Britain.
  - Central Scotland's ITV channel Scottish Television goes on the air, the first 7-day-a-week ITV franchise to do so.
- August – The ZETA fusion reactor begins operating at the Atomic Energy Research Establishment, Harwell, Oxfordshire.
- 4 September – Publication of the Wolfenden report, recommending "homosexual behaviour between consenting adults in private should no longer be a criminal offence", although it will be a decade before the necessary legislation is passed. The report also proposes stricter laws against street prostitution.
- 10 September – Tony Lock becomes the last bowler to reach 200 wickets in a first-class season, a feat subsequently impossible due to limited-overs cricket and covered pitches.
- 1 October
  - 1957–1958 influenza pandemic: The UK introduces a vaccine against the "Asian flu". Deaths from the condition will peak in week ending 17 October at 600 in England and Wales.
  - Which? magazine is first published by The Consumers' Association.
- 2 October – David Lean's Academy Award-winning film The Bridge on the River Kwai is released.
- 10 October – Windscale fire: The graphite core of the nuclear reactor at Windscale, Cumbria, catches fire, releasing substantial amounts of radioactive contamination into the surrounding area.
- 11 October – Jodrell Bank Observatory becomes operational.
- 28 October – Today is first broadcast as a daily early-morning topical radio show on the BBC Home Service. It will still be running more than 60 years later.
- 30 October – The government unveils plans which will allow women to join the House of Lords for the first time.
- 8 November
  - Operation Grapple: First successful (test) explosion of a British hydrogen bomb, at Christmas Island in the Pacific.
  - An inquiry into last month's fire at Windscale nuclear power plant blames the accident on a combination of human error, poor management and faulty instruments.
- 15 November – 1957 Aquila Airways Solent crash: A flying boat crash on the Isle of Wight kills 45.
- 4 December – The Lewisham rail crash kills 90 and injures 173.
- 10 December – Alexander R. Todd, Baron Todd wins the Nobel Prize in Chemistry "for his work on nucleotides and nucleotide co-enzymes".
- 12 December – Wales gets its own minister of state in the Westminster government for the first time.
- 25 December – The Royal Christmas Message is broadcast on television with the Queen on camera for the first time.
- 28 December – A case of foot-and-mouth disease is found at an abattoir in Liverpool.
- Undated
  - Minting of the sovereign as a bullion piece resumes.
  - The Manchester Guardian newspaper reintroduces a women's page, with Mary Stott as editor.

== Publications ==
- John Braine's novel Room at the Top.
- B^{2}FH, an astrophysics paper by British astronomers Geoffrey Burbidge, Margaret Burbidge and Fred Hoyle and American astronomer William Fowler describing the synthesis of the lightest elements through nuclear processes in stars.
- Agatha Christie's Miss Marple novel 4:50 from Paddington.
- Lawrence Durrell's novel Justine, first of The Alexandria Quartet, and his memoir Bitter Lemons.
- Ian Fleming's James Bond novel From Russia, with Love.
- Richard Hoggart's study The Uses of Literacy.
- Ted Hughes' first collection of poems The Hawk in the Rain.
- Alistair MacLean's wartime adventure novel The Guns of Navarone.
- Stevie Smith's poem "Not Waving but Drowning".
- Evelyn Waugh's novel The Ordeal of Gilbert Pinfold.
- Bert Weedon's guitar tutorial Play in a Day.
- John Wyndham's novel The Midwich Cuckoos.
- Michael Young and Peter Willmott's sociological study Family and Kinship in East London.

== Births ==
- 4 January – Charles Allen, television magnate
- 6 January – Michael Foale, astronaut
- 11 January – Bryan Robson, footballer
- 15 January – Patrick Dixon, business guru and author
- 16 January – Mark Pawsey, businessman and politician
- 17 January – Keith Chegwin, actor and television presenter (died 2017)
- 22 January – Francis Wheen, English journalist and author
- 24 January – Adrian Edmondson, comedian and actor
- 27 January – Janick Gers, heavy metal guitarist
- 28 January – Frank Skinner, English comedian, actor and television personality
- 1 February – Kenny Morris, musician (died 2026)
- 6 February – Matthew Best, conductor and singer (died 2025)
- 9 February – Gordon Strachan, footballer and manager
- 10 February – Helen Alexander, businesswoman (died 2017)
- 13 February – Tony Butler, bass guitarist
- 19 February – Ray Winstone, actor
- 22 February – Robert Bathurst, actor
- 27 February – Timothy Spall, character actor
- 5 March – Mark E. Smith, singer-songwriter (died 2018)
- 7 March – Robert Harris, novelist and journalist
- 10 March
  - Hilary Devey, businesswoman and television personality (died 2022)
  - Barry Gardiner, politician
- 21 March – Haydn Gwynne, actress (died 2023)
- 22 March – Michael Mosley, broadcaster and medic (died 2024)
- 25 March – Christina Boxer, middle-distance runner
- 31 March – Alan Duncan, politician
- 1 April
  - David Gower, cricket player and commentator
  - Stephen O'Brien, lawyer and politician, Shadow Secretary of State for Business, Innovation and Skills
- 3 April – Julia Hills, actress
- 7 April – Simon Climie, English singer-songwriter (Climie Fisher)
- 17 April – Nick Hornby, novelist
- 20 April – Graeme Fowler, English cricketer, coach and sportscaster
- 23 April – Richard Keys, sport presenter
- 24 April
  - Nazir Ahmed, Baron Ahmed, Pakistani-British Labour Party politician
  - David J, musician, producer, and writer
- 25 April – Eric Bristow, darts player (died 2018)
- 29 April – Daniel Day-Lewis, actor
- 8 May – Eddie Butler, Welsh rugby union player and commentator (died 2022)
- 10 May
  - Alex Jennings, actor
  - Sid Vicious, born John Ritchie, bassist (Sex Pistols) (died 1979)
- 13 May
  - Frances Barber, actress
  - Mark Heap, actor
- 18 May – Constance Briscoe, barrister disbarred and jailed for perverting the course of justice
- 21 May
  - Nadine Dorries, politician
  - Tony Hayward, businessman
- 23 May – Craig Brown, satirist
- 25 May – Alastair Campbell, journalist
- 27 May
  - Duncan Goodhew, swimmer
  - Siouxsie Sioux, born Susan Ballion, singer (Siouxsie and the Banshees)
- 4 June – Sue Hodge, actress
- 10 June – Lindsay Hoyle, politician
- 14 June
  - Debbie Arnold, actress and voice artiste
  - Maxwell Fraser, African-British rapper for Faithless, DJ
- 15 June – Stephen Lloyd, Kenyan-born English businessman and politician
- 22 June – Danny Baker, broadcaster and music journalist
- 5 July – David Hanson, politician
- 9 July
  - Marc Almond, singer
  - Paul Merton, actor and comedian
- 11 July
  - Peter Murphy, singer (Bauhaus)
  - Peter Oborne, journalist and broadcaster
- 15 July – Kate Kellaway, journalist and literary critic
- 17 July – Fern Britton, television presenter
- 18 July
  - Nick Faldo, golfer
  - Keith Levene, guitarist (died 2022)
- 20 July – Paul Daisley, politician (died 2003)
- 23 July – Jo Brand, comedian
- 10 August – Michael J. Todd, police officer (died 2008)
- 17 August – Robin Cousins, figure skater
- 20 August – Simon Donaldson, mathematician
- 22 August – Steve Davis, snooker player
- 24 August – Stephen Fry, comedian, author and actor
- 25 August – Simon McBurney, actor and director
- 27 August – Johnny Cunningham, Scottish composer (died 2003)
- 31 August – Glenn Tilbrook, Squeeze singer songwriter
- 7 September – John McInerney, singer songwriter
- 8 September – Dave Myers, television presenter (died 2024)
- 10 September – Mark Naylor, high jumper
- 12 September – Rachel Ward, actress
- 13 September – Mal Donaghy, footballer
- 27 September – John Inverdale, broadcaster
- 3 October – Tim Westwood, DJ and presenter
- 7 October – Jayne Torvill, ice skater
- 11 October
  - Paul Bown, actor
  - Dawn French, comic actor
- 14 October – Marc Neil-Jones, journalist (died 2025)
- 15 October – Michael Caton-Jones, Scottish film director
- 19 October – Karl Wallinger, musician (died 2024)
- 21 October – Julian Cope, musician and author
- 3 November – Gary Olsen, actor (died 2000)
- 13 November
  - Stephen Baxter, science fiction author
  - Alexandra Shulman, journalist
- 30 November – Colin Mochrie, comedian
- 6 December – Adrian Borland, English musician and producer (The Sound) (died 1999)
- 8 December – Phil Collen, singer and guitarist (Def Leppard)
- 10 December
  - Gerard Bramwell Long, Christian minister, evangelist, author and motivational speaker, previously banking executive
  - Paul Hardcastle, musician
- 13 December – Gary Davies, disc jockey
- 20 December
  - Stephen Bicknell, organ builder (died 2007)
  - Billy Bragg, singer
- 26 December – Dermot Murnaghan, journalist and television presenter (died 2026)
- Unknown – Jacquie de Creed, stunt woman (died 2011)

Dermot Murnaghan, journalist and television presenter (died 2026)

== Deaths ==
- 16 January – Alexander Cambridge, 1st Earl of Athlone, great-uncle of Queen Elizabeth II (born 1874)
- 21 January – Harry Gordon, popular entertainer (born 1893)
- 9 February – John Axon, railwayman (born 1900)
- 14 February – Robert Vansittart, 1st Baron Vansittart, diplomat (born 1881)
- 16 February – Leslie Hore-Belisha, 1st Baron Hore-Belisha, statesman after whom Belisha beacons are named (born 1893)
- 7 March – Wyndham Lewis, painter and author (born 1882, Canada)
- 21 March – Charles Kay Ogden, linguist, philosopher and writer (born 1889)
- 23 March – Sir Patrick Abercrombie, town planner (born 1879)
- 21 April – John Graham Kerr, embryologist and politician (born 1869)
- 17 June – Dorothy Richardson, feminist writer (born 1873)
- 27 June – Malcolm Lowry, novelist (born 1909)
- 1 August 1 – Rose Fyleman, English writer and poet (born 1877)
- 19 August – David Bomberg, painter (born 1890)
- 20 August – Edward Evans, 1st Baron Mountevans, explorer and admiral (born 1880)
- 1 September – Dennis Brain, horn player (born 1921)
- 11 September – James Burns, cricketer (born 1866)
- 29 September – Jane Carr, actress (born 1909)
- 14 October – Fred Russell, "The Father of Modern Ventriloquism" (born 1862)
- 20 October – Jack Buchanan, actor, singer and film director (born 1891)
- 2 November – William Haywood, architect (born 1876)
- 9 December – Llewellyn Henry Gwynne, first bishop of Egypt and Sudan (born 1863)
- 13 December – Michael Sadleir, novelist (born 1888)
- 17 December – Dorothy L. Sayers, writer (born 1893)
- 21 December – Eric Coates, composer (born 1886)
- 31 December – Sir Archibald Bodkin, Director of Public Prosecutions (born 1862)
- Undated – Michael Arabian (c.1876–1957), playwright and novelist (born c. 1876)

== See also ==
- 1957 in British music
- 1957 in British television
- List of British films of 1957
