= List of British films of 1957 =

A list of films produced in the United Kingdom in 1957 (see 1957 in film):

== 1957 ==
Title	Director	Cast	Genre	Notes
1957
The Abominable Snowman	Val Guest	Forrest Tucker, Peter Cushing, Maureen Connell	Horror	
Account Rendered	Peter Graham Scott	Griffith Jones, Ursula Howells, Honor Blackman	Mystery	
Across the Bridge	Ken Annakin	Rod Steiger, Bernard Lee, Marla Landi	Thriller	
Action of the Tiger	Terence Young	Van Johnson, Martine Carol, Herbert Lom	Action	
The Admirable Crichton	Lewis Gilbert	Kenneth More, Diane Cilento, Cecil Parker, Sally Ann Howes	Adventure/Comedy/Romance	Alternate title Paradise Lagoon
After the Ball	Compton Bennett	Patricia Kirkwood, Laurence Harvey, Jerry Verno	Biographical drama	
At the Stroke of Nine	Lance Comfort	Patricia Dainton, Stephen Murray, Dermot Walsh	Crime	
Barnacle Bill	Charles Frend	Alec Guinness, Maurice Denham	Comedy	Ealing Studios
The Barretts of Wimpole Street	Sidney Franklin	John Gielgud, Jennifer Jones, Bill Travers	Drama	
The Big Chance	Peter Graham Scott	Adrienne Corri, William Russell, Ian Colin	Drama	
The Birthday Present	Pat Jackson	Tony Britton, Sylvia Syms	Drama	
Black Ice	Godfrey Grayson	Paul Carpenter, Gordon Jackson	Adventure	
Blue Murder at St Trinian's	Frank Launder	George Cole, Terry-Thomas, Joyce Grenfell	Comedy	
The Bolshoi Ballet	Paul Czinner	Galina Ulanova, Raisa Struchkova, Nikolai Fadeyechev	Musical	
Booby Trap	Henry Cass	Sydney Tafler, Patti Morgan	Crime	
The Bridge on the River Kwai	David Lean	Alec Guinness, William Holden, Sessue Hayakawa	World War II/POW	Number 11 in the list of BFI Top 100 British films; winner of seven Academy Awards
Brothers in Law	Roy Boulting	Richard Attenborough, Ian Carmichael	Comedy	
Campbell's Kingdom	Ralph Thomas	Dirk Bogarde, Stanley Baker	Western	
Carry On Admiral	Val Guest	David Tomlinson, Peggy Cummins	Comedy	
Count Five and Die	Victor Vicas	Jeffrey Hunter, Nigel Patrick	World War II	
The Curse of Frankenstein	Terence Fisher	Peter Cushing, Christopher Lee	Horror	First starring role For Christopher Lee
The Devil's Pass	Darcy Conyers	John Slater, Joan Newell, Archie Duncan	Drama	
Dangerous Exile	Brian Desmond Hurst	Louis Jourdan, Belinda Lee	Historical	
Doctor at Large	Ralph Thomas	Dirk Bogarde, Muriel Pavlow	Comedy	
The End of the Line	Charles Saunders	Alan Baxter, Barbara Shelley	Crime	
Face in the Night	Lance Comfort	Griffith Jones, Lisa Gastoni	Crime	
Fire Down Below	Robert Parrish	Rita Hayworth, Jack Lemmon, Robert Mitchum	Adventure	
The Flesh Is Weak	Don Chaffey	John Derek, Milly Vitale	Drama	
Fortune Is a Woman (U.S: She Played with Fire)	Sidney Gilliat	Jack Hawkins, Arlene Dahl	Crime	
The Girl in the Picture	Don Chaffey	Donald Houston, Patrick Holt	Crime	
The Good Companions	J. Lee Thompson	Eric Portman, Celia Johnson	Musical	
The Heart Within	David Eady	James Hayter, Clifford Evans	Drama	
Hell Drivers	Cy Endfield	Stanley Baker, Peggy Cummins	Drama	
High Flight	John Gilling	Ray Milland, Bernard Lee	Drama	
High Tide at Noon	Philip Leacock	Betta St. John, William Sylvester	Drama	Entered into the 1957 Cannes Film Festival
Hour of Decision	C. M. Pennington-Richards	Jeff Morrow, Hazel Court	Mystery	
The House in the Woods	Maxwell Munden	Ronald Howard, Patricia Roc	Mystery	
How to Murder a Rich Uncle	Nigel Patrick	Nigel Patrick, Charles Coburn	Comedy/crime	
The Hypnotist	Montgomery Tully	Paul Carpenter, Patricia Roc	Thriller	
Ill Met by Moonlight	Michael Powell, Emeric Pressburger	Dirk Bogarde, Marius Goring, Cyril Cusack	World War II	
Interpol	John Gilling	Victor Mature, Anita Ekberg	Crime	
Just My Luck	John Paddy Carstairs	Norman Wisdom, Jill Dixon	Sports/comedy	
Kill Me Tomorrow	Terence Fisher	Pat O'Brien, Lois Maxwell	Crime	
A King in New York	Charlie Chaplin	Charlie Chaplin, Dawn Addams	Comedy	
Lady of Vengeance	Burt Balaban	Dennis O'Keefe, Ann Sears	Crime	
Let's Be Happy	Henry Levin	Vera-Ellen, Tony Martin	Musical	
The Little Hut	Mark Robson	Ava Gardner, David Niven, Stewart Granger	Comedy/romance	Co-production with the United States
The Long Haul	Ken Hughes	Victor Mature, Gene Anderson	Drama	
Lucky Jim	John Boulting	Ian Carmichael, Terry-Thomas	Comedy	
Man from Tangier	Lance Comfort	Robert Hutton, Lisa Gastoni	Crime	
The Man in the Sky	Charles Crichton	Jack Hawkins, Elizabeth Sellars	Thriller	
The Man Without a Body	Charles Saunders	Robert Hutton, George Coulouris	Horror	
Manuela	Guy Hamilton	Trevor Howard, Elsa Martinelli	Drama	Entered into the 7th Berlin International Film Festival
Miracle in Soho	Julian Amyes	John Gregson, Belinda Lee	Romance	
Morning Call	Arthur Crabtree	Greta Gynt, Ron Randell	Thriller	Original title The Strange Case of Dr. Manning
The Naked Truth	Mario Zampi	Peter Sellers, Peggy Mount	Comedy	
Night of the Demon	Jacques Tourneur	Dana Andrews, Peggy Cummins	Horror	
No Road Back	Montgomery Tully	Skip Homeier, Sean Connery	Crime	
No Time for Tears	Cyril Frankel	Anna Neagle, George Baker	Drama	
Not Wanted on Voyage	Maclean Rogers	Ronald Squire, Brian Rix	Comedy	
The One That Got Away	Roy Ward Baker	Hardy Krüger, Michael Goodliffe, Alec McCowen	World War II	
The Passionate Stranger	Muriel Box	Margaret Leighton, Ralph Richardson	Drama	
The Prince and the Showgirl	Laurence Olivier	Laurence Olivier, Marilyn Monroe	Comedy/romance	
Quatermass 2	Val Guest	Brian Donlevy, Sid James	Science-fiction	
Robbery Under Arms	Jack Lee	Peter Finch, Ronald Lewis	Crime	Filmed in Australia
Rockets Galore!	Michael Relph	Jeannie Carson, Donald Sinden, Roland Culver	Comedy	
Rogue's Yarn	Vernon Sewell	Nicole Maurey, Derek Bond, Elwyn Brook-Jones	Thriller	
Saint Joan	Otto Preminger	Jean Seberg, Richard Widmark, Richard Todd	Historical	
The Scamp	Wolf Rilla	Richard Attenborough, Jill Adams	Drama	
Sea Wife	Bob McNaught	Joan Collins, Richard Burton	Thriller	
Second Fiddle	Maurice Elvey	Adrienne Corri, Thorley Walters	Comedy	
The Secret Place	Clive Donner	Belinda Lee, Ronald Lewis	Drama	
Seven Thunders	Hugo Fregonese	Stephen Boyd, James Robertson Justice	World War II	
Seven Waves Away	Richard Sale	Tyrone Power, Mai Zetterling	Adventure	
The Shiralee	Leslie Norman	Peter Finch, Dana Wilson	Drama	Filmed in Australia
Small Hotel	David MacDonald	Gordon Harker, Marie Lohr	Comedy	
The Smallest Show on Earth	Basil Dearden	Bill Travers, Virginia McKenna, Peter Sellers	Comedy	
The Steel Bayonet	Michael Carreras	Leo Genn, Kieron Moore	World War II	
The Story of Esther Costello	David Miller	Joan Crawford, Heather Sears	Drama	
Stranger in Town	George Pollock	Alex Nicol, Anne Paige	Crime	
Strangers' Meeting	Robert Day	Peter Arne, Delphi Lawrence	Crime	
The Surgeon's Knife	Gordon Parry	Donald Houston, Adrienne Corri	Crime	
Suspended Alibi	Alfred Shaughnessy	Patrick Holt, Honor Blackman	Crime	
Tarzan and the Lost Safari	H. Bruce Humberstone	Gordon Scott Robert Beatty	African adventure	
That Woman Opposite	Compton Bennett	Phyllis Kirk, Dan O'Herlihy	Crime	
There's Always a Thursday	Charles Saunders	Charles Victor, Jill Ireland	Crime	
These Dangerous Years	Herbert Wilcox	George Baker, Frankie Vaughan	Comedy	
Time Lock	Gerald Thomas	Robert Beatty, Betty McDowall, Sean Connery	Thriller	
The Tommy Steele Story	Gerard Bryant	Tommy Steele, Patrick Westwood	Musical	
Town on Trial	John Guillermin	John Mills, Charles Coburn	Mystery	
True as a Turtle	Wendy Toye	John Gregson, Cecil Parker	Comedy	
The Truth About Women	Muriel Box	Laurence Harvey, Julie Harris	Comedy	
The Vicious Circle	Gerald Thomas	John Mills, Lionel Jeffries	Thriller	
West of Suez	Arthur Crabtree	Keefe Brasselle, Kay Callard	Drama	
Windom's Way	Ronald Neame	Peter Finch, Mary Ure	Drama	
Woman in a Dressing Gown	J. Lee Thompson	Yvonne Mitchell	Drama	Mitchell won the Silver Bear for Best Actress at Berlin.
Yangtse Incident: The Story of H.M.S. Amethyst	Michael Anderson	Richard Todd, William Hartnell	Action	
You Pay Your Money	Maclean Rogers	Hugh McDermott, Jane Hylton	Crime	

== See also ==
- 1957 in British music
- 1957 in British television
- 1957 in the United Kingdom
