= Margo McLennan =

British-Australian actress (1938–2004)

- Born: Eileen Marguerite McMenemy; 8 February 1938; Peckham, London, England, UK
- Died: 28 July 2004 (aged 66); Colgate, Sussex, England, UK
- Other names: Margo Mayne; Margo Lady McLennan; Margot McLennan; Marco McLennan
- Education: Italia Conti Academy
- Occupations: Actress; singer; dancer
- Years active: 1953–2003
- Spouse(s): Tony Doonan (m. 1962; div. 1969) Rod McLennan (m. 1974)
- Children: Nicola

Eileen Marguerite McNenemy (8 February 1938 – 28 July 2004) professionally known as Margo McLennan, she was also billed in her early acting career as Margo Mayne and briefly as Margot McLennan and Marco McLennan, was a British-born actress, singer and dancer who was active in England and Australia, where she became best known to international audiences for her role in the Australian TV cult soap opera Prisoner, (known in United States and UK as Prisoner: Cell Block H and Caged Woman in Canada)

== Biography ==
Born in Peckham, South London, to a father who was a licensed virtualler and professional violinist and a mother who dabbled in real estate speculation, she originally trained to be an ice skater at the Streatham Ice and Leisure Centre, before deciding instead a career as an actress, having trained in the arts at the Italia Conti Academy. her career spanned some 50 years.

One of the most popular actresses of the 1960s she was a theatre, film and TV star, who appeared on magazine covers and in commercials, after being spotted as a dancer in cabaret, she appeared in such stage roles as The Merchant of Venice and Goodnight Mrs. Puffin, the latter which marked her debut in West End theatre

She was married to fellow actor Tony Doonan from 1962 until their divorce in 1969. They had one child, Nicola, from that union. She changed her name to Margo Mayne.

In the 1960s and early 1970s she appeared in several British screen roles including Spaceflight IC-1 and Love Is a Splendid Illusion as well as numerous TV series including Night Train to Surbiton and Ransom For A Pretty Girl. She went on to play a succession of glamorous characters in shows such as The Gentle Killers, Motive for Murder and Man from Interpol.

Having moved to Australia, Margo joined the cult series Prisoner in 1979 as Catherine Roberts, in a controversial storyline where she is sent to prison for killing her daughter's rapist. During 1982 she returned to the show for a three episode guest role of Prison Officer Parsons.

After Prisoner she took guest roles in numerous TV series The Flying Doctors, A Country Practice, Blue Heelers and The Secret Life of Us.

In later life, under the name Margo Lady McLennen, she was an advocate for gay and lesbian marriage, and was a celebrant. Upon learning she had cancer, she returned to Britain with her second husband, Australian actor Rodney McLennan.

McLennan's final acting role was in Prisoner Queen (2003), playing Mrs. Gelding. She died in West Sussex, Britain from metastasised cancer, aged 66.

== Filmography ==
Production	Year	Role	Note
BBC Sunday Night Theatre	1954	Fairy Stardust	TV series
Motive for Murder	1957	Airport hostess	TV series
The Adventures of Brigadier Wellington-Bull	1959	War office secretary	TV series
Man from Interpol	1960		TV series, 1 episode (billed as Margot Mayne)
Golden Girl	1960	Jean	TV series
Danger Man	1960	Lena	TV series
Dixon of Dock Green	1961	Paddy Cooney	TV series
Theatre Night	1961	Jacqueline Fordyce	TV series
The Pursuers	1961	Rita	TV series
No Hiding Place	1963	Marian	TV series
Night Train to Surbiton	1965	Pamela	TV miniseries
Spaceflight IC-1: An Adventure in Space	1965	Joyce Walcott (billed as Margo Mayne)	
Softly Softly	1966	Mona	TV series
The Troubleshooters	1966	Air Hostess	TV series, billed as Margo Mayne
Ransom for a Pretty Girl	1966	Pamela	TV miniseries, billed as Margo Mayne
River Rivals	1967		TV series, billed as Margo Mayne
Love Is a Splendid Illusion	1970	Mrs. Allan	billed as Margo Mayne
Bright's Boffins	1971	Pirates Mate	TV series, billed as Margo Mayne
Justice	1971	Hilda	TV series, billed as Margo Mayne
The Getting of Wisdom	1977	?	
Bluey	1977	Bette Taylor	TV series
Prisoner	1979-1982	Catherine Roberts / Prison officer Parsons	TV series, billed as Marco McLennen
All the Rivers Run	1983	Aunt Miriam	TV miniseries
The Henderson Kids	1985	Secretary	TV series, billed as Margot McLennan
A Thousand Skies	1985	Society Hostess	TV miniseries
The More Things Change	1986	Barbara	
The Flying Doctors	1986	Helen Spencer	TV series
A Country Practice	1992	Mrs. Barker	TV series
Blue Heelers	1994	Jean Richards	TV series
The Secret Life of Us	2001	Stage Manager	TV series
Prisoner Queen	2003	Mrs. Gilding	
