= The Bolshoi Ballet (film) =

- Directed by: Paul Czinner
- Written by: Paul Czinner
- Produced by: Paul Czinner
- Starring: Galina Ulanova; Raisa Struchkova; Nikolai Fadeyechev
- Cinematography: S.D. Onions
- Edited by: Philip Hudsmith
- Music by: Yuri Fayer (musical director); Gennady Rozhdestvensky (conductor); Orchestra of the Royal Opera House
- Production companies: Paul Czinner Production; Harmony Films (for); J.R. Maxwell Productions
- Distributed by: J. Arthur Rank Film Distributors; Rank Film Distributors of America; Video Artists International (VAI)
- Release date: October 1957
- Running time: 100 min
- Country: United Kingdom
- Language: English

The Bolshoi Ballet is a 1957 British musical film directed by Paul Czinner and starring Galina Ulanova, Raisa Struchkova, and Nikolai Fadeyechev. The film's composers, Yuri Fayer and Gennady Rozhdestvensky, were nominated for Best Original Score in the 31st Academy Awards (1958).

The film captures the 1956 performances of The Bolshoi Ballet in the United Kingdom at Davis Theatre, Croydon and at Covent Garden, performing divertissement and Giselle. The film was shot using multiple mobile, 35 mm Eastmancolor cameras.

== Cast ==
- Galina Ulanova as Giselle / Swan
- Raisa Struchkova as Raissa Struchkova
- Nikolai Fadeyechev

== See also ==
- List of British films of 1957

== Bibliography ==
- Spain, Louise (1998). Dance on Camera: A Guide to Dance Films and Videos. Scarecrow Press. ISBN 0810833034
