= Aimée Delamain =

English actress (1906–1999)

- Delamain in Never the Twain (1981)
- Born: Aimee Margaret Delamain; 21 April 1906; Rawul Pindee, Bengal, India
- Died: 18 June 1999 (aged 93); Denville Hall, Northwood, Hillingdon, London, England
- Other names: Aimee Delamain; Aimee Delamaine
- Occupation: Actress
- Years active: 1932–1992

Aimée Delamain (21 April 1906 – 18 June 1999) was an English actress, known for spending most of her career playing elderly ladies.

== Biography ==
Her father, Colonel Frank Delamain, was a member of King Edward VII's Bengal Lancers. Upon his retirement in 1909, the family moved to Lamberhurst, Kent. Tragedy struck in 1915 when Aimée's mother Mabel (née Bullock) died of rheumatic fever and the following year her elder brother Frank Gun Delamain was killed in action at the Battle of the Somme.

Brought up by relatives, she expressed a desire to act and began performing as a teenager in little plays in the village hall to raise money for the local football club. By 1931, she graduated from RADA. This was followed by playing in the provinces but when the Second World War broke out, Aimée worked as a nurse with the Voluntary Aid Detachment, later playing in an ENSA company.

Theatre roles soon followed, as did film and television work, the actress being a popular choice among directors for portraying old ladies. One such director was Peter Moffatt, as they had known each other since 1945 when they were both members of the same repertory company. Subsequently, he often cast her in several of his productions. Some parts were small but memorable, especially her appearance as a type of deus ex machina in the Fawlty Towers episode "The Psychiatrist", precipitating Basil Fawlty's mental breakdown. Larger roles, as detailed below, showed her range.

Never married, Delamain moved into Denville Hall, the retirement home for actors in February 1991, retiring from acting not long afterwards. There, she spent her final years and indulged in a lifelong passion for gardening.

== Selected filmography ==
=== Film ===
- Little Red Monkey (1955) – Mrs. Henley (Dr. Barnes's Housekeeper) (uncredited)
- The Secret (1955) – Miss Lyons
- Two Left Feet (1963) – Auntie (uncredited)
- Rotten to the Core (1965) – Lady Greville (uncredited)
- The Raging Moon (1971) – Alice
- I, Monster (1971) – Landlady
- The Amazing Mr. Blunden (1972) – Elsie Tucker
- The House in Nightmare Park (1973) – Mother
- One of Our Dinosaurs Is Missing (1975) – Millicent
- Who Is Killing the Great Chefs of Europe? a.k.a. Too Many Cooks (1978) – Old Woman
- Oxford Blues (1984) – Lady Bemore
- Santa Claus: The Movie (1985) – Storyteller
- High Spirits (1988) – Great Granny Plunkett
- Getting It Right (1989) – Mrs. Arbuthnot

=== Television ===
- The Bishop's Candlesticks (1949) – Baptistine
- Sunday Night Theatre (1954–1956) – Dulcie Curtis / Jessica Streatford
- Our Miss Pemberton (1957–1958) – Miss Henrietta Copley
- ITV Play of the Week (1959–1965) – Mrs. Culff / Phyllis / Miss Chancellor
- Theatre 70 (1960) – Beggarwoman
- Dixon of Dock Green (1961–1975) – Mrs. Lane / Matty / Arabella Floyd
- Tales of Mystery (1961–1962) – Aunt Eleanor / Mrs. Malleson
- Boyd Q.C. (1961) – Gladys Westbury
- Oliver Twist (1962) – Old Sally
- Z-Cars (1962) – Woman Customer
- Maigret (1962) – Lisette
- Harpers West One (1962) – Woman Customer
- Suspense (1963) – Aphrodite
- The Avengers (1963–1968) – 1st Lady / Miss Gladys Culpepper
- Emergency Ward 10 (1963) – Miss Edwardes
- Moonstrike (1963) – Farmer's Wife
- The Plane Makers (1963) – Mrs. Milne
- The Odd Man a.k.a. It's Dark Outside (1964) – Maude Rossiter
- The Human Jungle (1964) – Mrs. Oliver
- Riviera Police (1965) – Madame Beranger
- Hereward the Wake (1965) – Lapp nurse
- The Wednesday Play (1965) – Mrs. Morris
- Pardon the Expression (1966) – Miss Singleton
- No Hiding Place (1966) – Nurse Gibbs
- Thirteen Against Fate (1966) – Mademoiselle Couvert
- The Saint (1966) – Lady Haverstock
- Les Misérables (1967) – Porteress
- ITV Playhouse (1967–1968) – Miss Davidson / Prudence
- Omnibus (1969) – Old Mary
- The Main Chance (1969) – Alice Greensmith
- Softly, Softly (1969) – Mrs. Abbott
- The Root of All Evil? (1969) – Dame Helen Blake
- ITV Sunday Night Theatre (1971) – Mrs. Hubbard
- The Troubleshooters (1971) – Mrs. Izard senior
- The Rivals of Sherlock Holmes (1971) – Mrs. Hisgins
- Upstairs, Downstairs (1971) – Lady Templeton
- The Befrienders (1972) – Mrs. Kenwood
- Ooh La La! (1973) – Mademoiselle
- Owen, M.D. (1973) – Miriam Milton
- Crown Court (1974) – Mrs. Elgar
- The Morecambe & Wise Show (1974) – Miss Tasker
- Thriller (1975) – Penelope
- Beryl's Lot (1975) – Phoebe
- Shadows (1975) – Grandmother
- Angels (1976) – Dodie
- ITV Sunday Night Drama (1976) – Lady Taggart
- The Crezz (1976) – Lady Clarke
- Jackanory (1977) – Storyteller
- Target (1977) – Susan De Veer
- Come Back, Lucy (1978) – Aunt Olive
- Armchair Thriller (1978) – Mrs. Franklyn
- Oh No It's Selwyn Froggitt (1978) – Mrs. Price
- The Famous Five (1978) – Mrs. Thomas
- George and Mildred (1978–1979) – Old Lady / Patient
- Fawlty Towers (1979) – Mrs. Johnson
- Shoestring (1979) – Anne Appleby
- The Swish of the Curtain (1980) – Countess of Brackonshire
- The Sandbaggers (1980) – Penelope
- BBC2 Playhouse (1981) – Rose
- Chronicle (1982) – Mrs. Brasher
- All for Love (1982) – Miss Bird
- Never the Twain (1982) – Miss Barnes
- Cymbeline (1982) – Gentlewoman
- The Professionals (1983) – Old Lady
- Shine on Harvey Moon (1984) – Lady
- Doctor Who (1985) – Doña Arana
- One by One (1985) – Miss Rind
- Fresh Fields (1985) – Mrs. Bevin
- C.A.T.S. Eyes (1986) – Mrs. Sitwell
- Screen Two (1987–1992) – Lady Birdstock / Ambulatory Grannie
- The District Nurse (1987) – Emily Rees
- Casualty (1987) – Eugenie
- 'Allo 'Allo! (1987) – Madame Sablon
- All in Good Faith (1988) – Mrs. Bagley
- Don't Wait Up (1988) – Mrs. Clarke
- Dramarama (1988) – Bookseller
- Wyatt's Watchdogs (1988) – Mary Spencer
- The Bill (1988–1990) – Mrs. West / Pensioner on Bus
- You Rang, M'Lord? (1990) – Aunt Maud
- A Bit of Fry & Laurie (1990) – Customer Service Lady
- Devices and Desires (1991) – Mrs. Copley
- Dizzy Heights (1991) – Rose
