= Johnny, You're Wanted (TV series) =

1953 British BBC TV series

- Genre: Mystery
- Written by: Maurice McLaughlin
- Starring: John Slater; Joan Newell
- Country of origin: United Kingdom
- Original language: English
- No. of series: 1
- No. of episodes: 6

Production
- Producer: Douglas Moodie
- Running time: 30 minutes
- Production company: BBC

Original release
- Network: BBC 1
- Release: 7 November – 12 December 1953

Johnny, You're Wanted is a British television series that originally aired on BBC in six episodes between 7 November and 12 December 1953. In 1956 it was adapted into a film of the same title also starring Slater.

== Cast ==
- John Slater as Johnny (6 episodes)
- Joan Newell as Joan (6 episodes)
- Tom Clegg as Trunker (5 episodes)
- Herbert Smith as Old Moore (4 episodes)
- Theodore Bikel as Ferrari (4 episodes)
- Martin Wyldeck as Inspector Markham (4 episodes)
- John Boulter as Detective Sergeant (4 episodes)
- Elspet Gray as Beryl (3 episodes)
- Joan Young as Matron (3 episodes)
- William Franklyn as Dr Matthews (3 episodes)
- Jack Newmark as Solomon (3 episodes)
- Diana Graves as Sonia (2 episodes)
- Frank Hawkins as Mac (2 episodes)
- Lind Joyce as Cabaret Singer (2 episodes)
- Frederick Wheldon as Maitre d'Hotel (2 episodes)
- Arthur Lovegrove as Sid (1 episode)
- Jacqueline Squire as Peggy (1 episode)
- Reginald Hearne as Police Sergeant (1 episode)
- Kenneth Cope as Police Constable (1 episode)
- John Vere as Tobacconist (1 episode)
- Olivia Burleigh as Lady Stoke 1 episode)
- Noel Davis as Motor Mechanic (1 episode)
- Alec Finter asStage-Door Keeper (1 episode)

== Bibliography ==
- Baskin, Ellen . Serials on British Television, 1950-1994. Scolar Press, 1996.
