= Gerard Long =

Gerard Long may refer to:

- Gerard Damien Long, birthname of Hodgy, American rapper, singer and record producer
- Gerard Bramwell Long, Christian minister, evangelist and author
