= The Voodoo Factor =

British TV series (1959–1960)

- Created by: Lewis Greifer
- Starring: Maurice Kaufmann; Maxine Audley; Jill Hyem
- Music by: John Dankworth
- Country of origin: United Kingdom
- No. of series: 1
- No. of episodes: 6

Production
- Producer: Quentin Lawrence
- Running time: 30 minutes
- Production company: ATV

Original release
- Network: ITV
- Release: 9 December 1959 – 16 January 1960

The Voodoo Factor is a 1959–1960 British television drama mini-series. It consisted of six half-hour episodes and was written by Lewis Griefer.

Cast members included Maurice Kaufmann, Maxine Audley and Jill Hyem who later went on to write and create many TV series herself. Hyem remembers being afraid of the real spiders used in the production and the fact that during recording Griefer had still not decided if her character, Alice Simms, would die or not.

Unlike many other British series of the 1950s, the series survives intact. It was produced by Associated Television (ATV).

== Cast ==
- Maurice Kaufmann as Dr. David Whittaker
- Maxine Audley as Marion Whittaker
- Philip Bond as Dr. Tony Wilson
- Charles Carson as Captain Ross
- Jill Hyem as Alice Simms
- Anna May Wong as Malayan Girl
- Richard Burrell as Jim Herring
- Frank Hawkins as Albert Williams
- Tony Church as Professor Axhem

== See also ==
- Five Names for Johnny
- The Gentle Killers
- The Man Who Finally Died
- Motive for Murder
