= Johnny, You're Wanted =

1956 British film by Vernon Sewell

- Original Australian daybill
- Directed by: Vernon Sewell
- Written by: Frank Driscoll; Michael Leighton
- Produced by: George Maynard
- Starring: John Slater; Alfred Marks; Garry Marsh
- Cinematography: Basil Emmott
- Edited by: Peter Rolfe Johnson
- Music by: Robert Sharples
- Distributed by: Anglo-Amalgamated
- Release date: January 1956
- Running time: 70 minutes
- Country: United Kingdom
- Language: English

Johnny, You're Wanted is a 1956 British crime second feature film, directed by Vernon Sewell and starring John Slater and Alfred Marks. It was written by Frank Driscoll and Michael Leighton based on the 1953 BBC television series of the same name which also starred Slater. The film features strongwoman Joan Rhodes performing her stage act.

It was one of several films Sewell directed for Anglo Amalgamated.

== Plot ==
Johnny is a long-distance lorry driver returning to London from a provincial delivery, after having taken in a show by Joan Rhodes on the way. Late at night he stops to give a lift to an attractive female hitchhiker whose car has broken down and who is in a hurry to get to back to London. Later, Johnny pulls in to a transport café to make a telephone call and buy a coffee. When he returns to his truck, the woman is gone. Assuming that in her hurry she has picked up a lift with another driver, he goes on his way, and a few miles down the road is flagged down by another driver to help with a woman who has been found lying on the roadside. It turns out that the woman is Johnny's hitchhiker, and that she is dead.

Johnny goes to a vaudeville show where the assistant of Balsamo, a magician/horoscope reader/fortune teller, looks like the dead girl. Joan Rhodes is also on the bill. Johnny goes on the stage with Joan to assist her with her displays of strength. After this he speaks to Balsamo and tells him what happened. The girl worked for Balsamo for six months and was an Australian who came via Toronto. They go to the police and identify the body.

The police take Johnny to the scene where the dead girl was found and then to where he picked her up. It is revealed that the girl was murdered, later said to be strangled. Johnny then heads off on another trip and agrees to collect some magic items for Balsamo from a magic shop. He is given a package and heads back. The package is given to Balsamo. Johnny mentions that the dead girl had a laundrette card in her purse.

The police get a tip off that some drugs will be landed from across the channel. They catch some people collecting the package. The girl says she has to take the package to a laundrette. A policeman realises it may be connected to the dead girl.

A policewomen is substituted for the captured girl. She goes to the laundrette with the package and a man comes in speaking a foreign language to the policewomen but when she does not understand he says he must be mistaken. They follow the man.

Johnny goes to the laundrette and shows a picture of the dead girl to the manager but she denies knowing her, but Johnny thinks she did know her. The policeman goes to the magic shop but finds out nothing. The magic shop is put under surveillance. Balsamo asks Johnny to collect another box of charms from the magic shop.

Johnny gets the charms and the shop owner phones Balsamo's theatre when he sees the police grab Johnny. They find the package is drugs. They arrest the shop owner and realise what has been happening. The police get Johnny to deliver the package to Balsamo.

The police deduce that Balsamo's customers mail him their date of birth and at his shows buy a horoscope from him. They are given a package of drugs instead of the horoscope.

The police are in the audience for Balsamo's next show and Johnny delivers the package. Balsamo's assistant grabs it from him and takes the "horoscopes" to Balsamo. He sells one to a man.

Balsamo receives a message which is from the magic shop owner. He realises he has been discovered and goes to the railway station and catches a train. The man is arrested with the drugs and the police track Balsamo to the train. They get the train to slow down so they can get ahead by car.

The police catch up with the train and board it. The train continues on. The police try to arrest Balsamo but he opens the door on his cabin to jump out and is hit by a train heading in the other direction.

It turns out that the girl was trying to get more money. The shop owner was driving her when she ran away. After she left Johnny, Balsamo collected her and killed her.

== Cast ==
- John Slater as Johnny
- Alfred Marks as Marks
- Garry Marsh as Balsamo
- Joan Rhodes as herself
- Chris Halward as Julie
- Jack Stewart as Inspector Bennett
- John Stuart as surgeon
- Ann Lynn as Chorine

== Production ==
Sewell called it "a stupid story."

== Critical reception ==
The Monthly Film Bulletin wrote: "Based on a TV series, this film is designed to provide a vehicle for John Slater as Johnny and Alfred Marks as the joke shop proprietor. For the former, the cap fits fairly well, though his playing is monotonous and one becomes tired of the phoney "working class" jokes and atmosphere. But Alfred Marks' 'act' is artificially dragged in, and holds up a story which is otherwise reasonably efficient, though slow. Jack Stewart scores with a neat portrait of a hard-working detective."

TV Guide called the film a "well-conceived thriller ... The situations and performances are a bit forced, but otherwise interest is easily maintained."
