= Richard Pasco =

British actor (1926–2014)

- Born: Richard Edward Pasco; 18 July 1926; Barnes, Surrey, England, UK
- Died: 12 November 2014 (aged 88); Warwickshire, England, UK
- Education: Royal Central School of Speech and Drama
- Occupation: Actor
- Years active: 1954–2002
- Spouse(s): Greta Watson (m. 1956; div. 1964) Barbara Leigh-Hunt (m. 1967)
- Children: 1

Richard Edward Pasco (18 July 1926 – 12 November 2014) was a British stage, screen and television actor.

== Early life ==
Pasco was born in Barnes, Surrey, the only child of insurance company clerk Cecil George Pasco (1897–1982) and milliner Phyllis Irene (1895–1989; née Widdison). He was educated at the King's College School, Wimbledon. He became an apprentice stage manager at the Q Theatre before studying at the Central School of Speech and Drama, where he won the gold medal. He then spent three years with the Birmingham Repertory Company.

== Career ==
One of his earliest screen appearances was as Teddy in Room at the Top (1959). His other films include Yesterday's Enemy (1959), Sword of Sherwood Forest (1960), The Gorgon (1964) and Rasputin, the Mad Monk (1966), all for Hammer Studios.

During his lengthy stage career, which began in 1943, he worked with the Old Vic, the Royal Court, the Royal Shakespeare Company and the National Theatre. Pasco played the part of Frank Rice in the original stage production of John Osborne's play The Entertainer (1957) with Laurence Olivier. One of his most memorable performances was in John Barton's 1973 production of Richard II for the RSC (alternating the title role and that of Bolingbroke, (pronounced 'Bullen-brook'), with Ian Richardson). During the 1974 New York run, an episode of CBS's Camera Three featured Pasco and Richardson alternating the roles in some of the play's key scenes. Pasco can also be heard performing the role of Richard in its entirety on the Marlowe Society recording of the complete play. Among his radio successes were his performances of BBC Radio 4's Morning Story for BBC Pebble Mill producer David Shute. He portrayed Lieutenant-Commander Ericson in the 1980 BBC Radio adaptation of Nicholas Monsarrat's The Cruel Sea. His TV credits include the role of Brutus in Julius Caesar and the "melancholy" Jaques in As You Like It (1979) by William Shakespeare in the BBC's Shakespeare cycle. He also participated in Barton's televised series of "Playing Shakespeare" workshops. Pasco played the leading part of Stephen Sorrell in the 1984 TV mini-series Sorrell and Son.

His later work includes Mrs. Brown (1997), the Inspector Morse episode "Dead on Time", A Dance to the Music of Time (1997), and Hetty Wainthropp Investigates (1998).

== Personal life and death ==
Pasco married Greta Watson in 1954. The marriage, producing one child, ended in 1964. He married actress Barbara Leigh-Hunt in 1967.

Pasco died aged 88 on 12 November 2014.

== Filmography ==
Year	Title	Role	Notes
1957	Kill Me Tomorrow	Dr. Fisher	
1959	Room at the Top	Teddy	
1959	Yesterday's Enemy	2nd Lt Hastings	
1959	The Man Who Finally Died	Joe Newman	TV series
1959	Dial 999 (TV series) ('Deadly Blackmail', episode)	Willard	Billed as 'Willard', but his character's name is never spoken.
1960	Sword of Sherwood Forest	Edward, Earl of Newark	
1964	Hot Enough for June	Plakov	
1964	The Gorgon	Paul Heitz	
1966	Rasputin, the Mad Monk	Dr. Zargo	
1979	Julius Caesar	Brutus	TV movie
1980	The Watcher in the Woods	Tom Colley	
1984	Arch of Triumph	Veber	
1997	Mrs Brown	Doctor Jenner	
1997	A Dance to the Music of Time	Sir Magnus Donners	TV series
