= Geoffrey Chater =

English actor (1921–2021)

- Born: Geoffrey Michael Chater Robinson; 23 March 1921; Barnet, Hertfordshire, England
- Died: 16 October 2021 (aged 100); Iden, East Sussex, England
- Occupation: Actor
- Years active: 1950–2005

Geoffrey Michael Chater Robinson (23 March 1921 – 16 October 2021) was an English film, television and stage actor. He appeared in the crime drama series Callan, Foyle's War, Midsomer Murders and in the classic episode Six Days of the spy-fi Department S .

== Early life ==
Geoffrey Michael Chater Robinson was born in Barnet, Hertfordshire on 23 March 1921 and lived in Iden, East Sussex and London. His father, Lawrence Chater Robinson, was a composer of music for dance bands and his mother Peggy was an actress. It was seeing her perform at London St Martin's Theatre when he was 11 that made him want to follow her onto the stage.

Chater was educated at Marlborough College. Following the outbreak of the Second World War, he joined the Royal Fusiliers in 1940. He served as a captain in India and Burma, where he wrote and performed in revues for the troops during time off. He served in the British Army until 1946.

== Career ==
Following his military service, he focused on his career in the entertainment industry. He became an assistant stage manager at the Theatre Royal, Windsor, where in 1947, made his first professional appearance in A Midsummer Night's Dream. His West End debut was in 1952, as "Constable" in Master Crook. Later on he appeared in Howard Brenton's play Magnificence. He also had a minor role in the British TV serial Brideshead Revisited, in which he played the role of a British Consul. He made his film debut in 1958 with The Strange World of Planet X. In Gandhi (1982), he played the chairman of the inquiry into the Amritsar massacre. He also appeared in the film classics If.... (1968) and Barry Lyndon (1975) in supporting roles.

Chater's career saw him take on roles from Shakespeare to Midsomer Murders. While he appeared in films and television roles, he avoided longer contracts so he could have time to devote to his first love of performing in the theatre.

In 2017, Chater began giving poetry readings and he continued to read the lesson at his local church until lockdown was imposed as a response to the COVID-19 pandemic on 23 March 2020, his 99th birthday.

== Death ==
Chater turned 100 on 23 March 2021 and died on 16 October 2021 in Iden, East Sussex.

== Filmography ==
=== Film ===
- The Strange World of Planet X (1958) - Gerard Wilson
- Battle of the V-1 (1958) - Minister of Defence
- Wonderful Things! (1958) - Solicitor
- The Day the Earth Caught Fire (1961) - Pat Holroyd
- Two Letter Alibi (1962) - Inspector Warren
- If.... (1968) - Chaplain: Staff
- One of Those Things (1971) - Falck
- 10 Rillington Place (1971) - Old Bailey: Christmas Humphreys
- Endless Night (1972) - Coroner
- The Best Pair of Legs in the Business (1973) - Reverend Thorn
- O Lucky Man! (1973) - Bishop / Vicar
- Barry Lyndon (1975) - Doctor Broughton
- Gandhi (1982) - Government Advocate
- Bethune: The Making of a Hero (1990) - Doctor Archibald

=== Television ===
- Sherlock Holmes (1951) - Unknown
- Jan at the Blue Fox (1952) - Mr. Trevor
- The Birdcage Room (1954, TV film) - Mr. Blackfoot
- ITV Television Playhouse (1955) - Dusty
- ITV Play of the Week (1955-1963) - Various roles
- My Friend Charles (1956) - Doctor George Kimber
- Motive for Murder (1957) - Harry Manners
- Armchair Theatre (1958-1971) - Various roles
- The Third Man (1959) - Lord Farset
- Scotland Yard (1960) - Detective Superintendent Lawrie
- Saturday Playhouse (1960) - Raymond
- On Trial (1960) - A.J. Newton
- Walk a Crooked Mile (1961) - Arnold Hedges
- Storyboard (1961) - Duroc
- Family Solicitor (1961) - Mr. Tyler
- Echo Four Two (1961) - Acting Superintendent Dean
- Probation Officer (1961) - Sir Giles Enton
- Drama 61-67 (1962-1963) - Various roles
- No Hiding Place (1962-1965) - Various roles
- Crying Down the Lane (1962) - Superintendent Lambe
- Z Cars (1963) - Robson
- The Plane Makers (1963) - Simon Stride
- Ghost Squad (1963-1964) - Various roles
- BBC Sunday-Night Play (1963) - The Captain
- The Human Jungle (1963) - Householder
- The Scales of Justice (1963) - Mr. Soames
- Detective (1964) - Tony Garnish
- Espionage ('Snow on Mount Kama', episode) (1964) - Colonel Gregory
- Festival (1964) - Kindred
- Story Parade (1964) - Prosecutor
- The Indian Tales of Rudyard Kipling (1964) - Major Vansuythen
- Victoria Regina (1964) - Doctor Clark
- Theatre 625 (1965-1967) - Various roles
- Front Page Story (1965) - Bosley Morton
- Emergency-Ward 10 (1965) - Commander Boyle RN
- The Troubleshooters (1966-1967) - Charles du Cros
- Vendetta (1966) - Don Gino
- Adam Adamant Lives! (1967) - Commissioner Hobson
- The Wednesday Play (1967) - Richard Browning
- Softly, Softly (1967) - Framley
- Sexton Blake (1967) - William Passer
- The Avengers (1967-1968) - Jarvis/Seaton
- City '68 (1967-1968) - Wainwright
- ITV Playhouse (1967-1980) - Various roles
- The Champions (1968) - Forster
- The Saint (1968) - Carl Howard
- Department S (1968) -Peck
- The Expert (1968-1969) - Tom Caldicott
- The Power Game (1969) - Arthur Stilton
- ITV Sunday Night Theatre (1969) - Toby Pears
- Department S (1969) - Peck
- Rogues' Gallery (1969) - Sir Richard Manningham
- W. Somerset Maugham (1969) - Mr. Grey
- The Main Chance (1969-1975) - Roger Chapman
- Big Brother (1970) - Sir Michael Clarke
- Callan (1970-1972) - Bishop
- Steptoe and Son (1970) - Peregrine
- Biography (1970) - Hoppner
- Fraud Squad (1970) - Brigadier Wildblood
- Doomwatch (1971) - Mullery
- Paul Temple (1971) - Sir Harold Malyon
- Justice (1971) - Lord Rush
- Jason King (1971) - Mr. Horner
- Dad's Army (1972) - Colonel Pierce
- The Dick Emery Show (1972-1975) - Various roles
- Ooh La La! (1973) - Landernau
- Orson Welles' Great Mysteries (1973) - Donald Cosgrove
- Some Mothers Do 'Ave 'Em (1973) - Bank manager
- Thriller (1973-1975) - Various roles
- Special Branch (1974) - Sir Gerald Pastor
- Fall of Eagles (1974) - Charles
- General Hospital (1974) - Mr. Hillier
- Shoulder to Shoulder (1974) - Holloway Prison Governor
- Father Brown (1974) - Leonard Smythe
- Moll Flanders (1975) - George Mace
- Thriller (1975) Episode: "The Next Voice You See" - Sir Peter Hastings
- Jackanory Playhouse (1975) - Chancellor
- Village Hall (1975) - Leonard Beamish
- The Poisoning of Charles Bravo (1975) - Mr. Gorst
- Hogg's Back (1975) - Inspector
- Crown Court (1976) - Professor Stuart Adams
- Hadleigh (1976) - David Ringham
- The Howerd Confessions (1976) - Mr. Parsley
- Within These Walls (1976) - Judge Lionel Hunt
- Romance (1977) - Sir Charles Verdayne
- Devenish (1977) - Admiral Sir Percival Wallow
- The Upchat Line (1977) - Mr. Peabody
- The Cedar Tree (1978) - Walter Henderson
- Strangers (1979) - Barker
- Rings on Their Fingers (1979) - Mr. Lowther
- Penmarric (1979) - Doctor Ormott
- Prince Regent (1979) - Henry Addington
- Play for Today (1979-1981) - Various roles
- Premiere (1980) - Superintendent
- Agony (1981) - Mr. Lucas
- Bognor (1981) - Sir Erris Beg
- The Good Soldier (1981) - Bagshawe
- Winston Churchill: The Wilderness Years (1981) - Lord Hailsham
- Brideshead Revisited (1981) - Consul
- Othello (1981) - Brabantio
- Troilus & Cressida (1981) - Nestor
- Shelley (1982) - Mr. Fairbass
- The Agatha Christie Hour (1982) - Canon Parfitt
- Harry's Game (1982) - Colonel George Frost
- The Further Adventures of Lucky Jim (1982) - Magistrate
- Tales of the Unexpected (1982) - James Hamilton
- Nanny (1983) - Major Fancombe
- The Cleopatras (1983) - Perigenes
- A Married Man (1983) - Sir Peter Craxton
- The Aerodrome (1983) - Dr. Faulkner
- Shackleton (1983) - Sir Clements Markham
- Foxy Lady (1984) - Mr. Molyneux
- Strangers and Brothers (1984) - Thomas Bevill
- Blott on the Landscape (1985) - Minister
- Mapp and Lucia (1985-1986) - Mr. Algernon Wyse
- Screen Two (1985-1987) - Various roles
- Indiscreet (1988) - Finley
- A Taste for Death (1988) - Frank Musgrave
- The Dog It Was That Died (1989) - Wren
- Anything More Would Be Greedy (1989) - Sir William Crome
- Chelworth (1989) - Rafe Holingsworth
- Norbert Smith, a Life (1989) - Cyril Freebody
- Saracen (1989) - Alan Ross
- The New Statesman (1990) - Justice Saunders
- Harry Enfield's Television Programme (1990) - Mr. Dickinson
- Spymaker: The Secret Life of Ian Fleming 1990) - Lawyer
- Bergerac (1990) - Sir Matthew Osterson
- Brass (1990) - Air Vice Marshal Plunkett-Downe
- One Foot in the Grave (1990) - Reverend Croker
- Rumpole of the Bailey (1991) - Gregory Fabian
- Harry Enfield and Chums (1994) - Headmaster
- The House of Eliott (1994) - Wilkinson
- The Rector's Wife (1994) - The Bishop
- Pie in the Sky (1994) - Doctor Lonsdale
- The Detectives (1995) - Sutton Frobisher
- The Thin Blue Line (1995) - Carol Singer
- The Bill (1998) - Edward Robbins
- In the Red (1998) - Mr Justice Frimlington
- Heartbeat (1999) Hal Clifford
- Heartbeat (2003) - Sir Henry Bing
- Foyle's War (2003) - Professor Phillips
- Midsomer Murders (2005) - Brother Robert
