= 1877 in the United Kingdom =

Events from the year 1877 in the United Kingdom.

== Incumbents ==
- Monarch – Victoria
- Prime Minister – Benjamin Disraeli (Conservative)

== Events ==
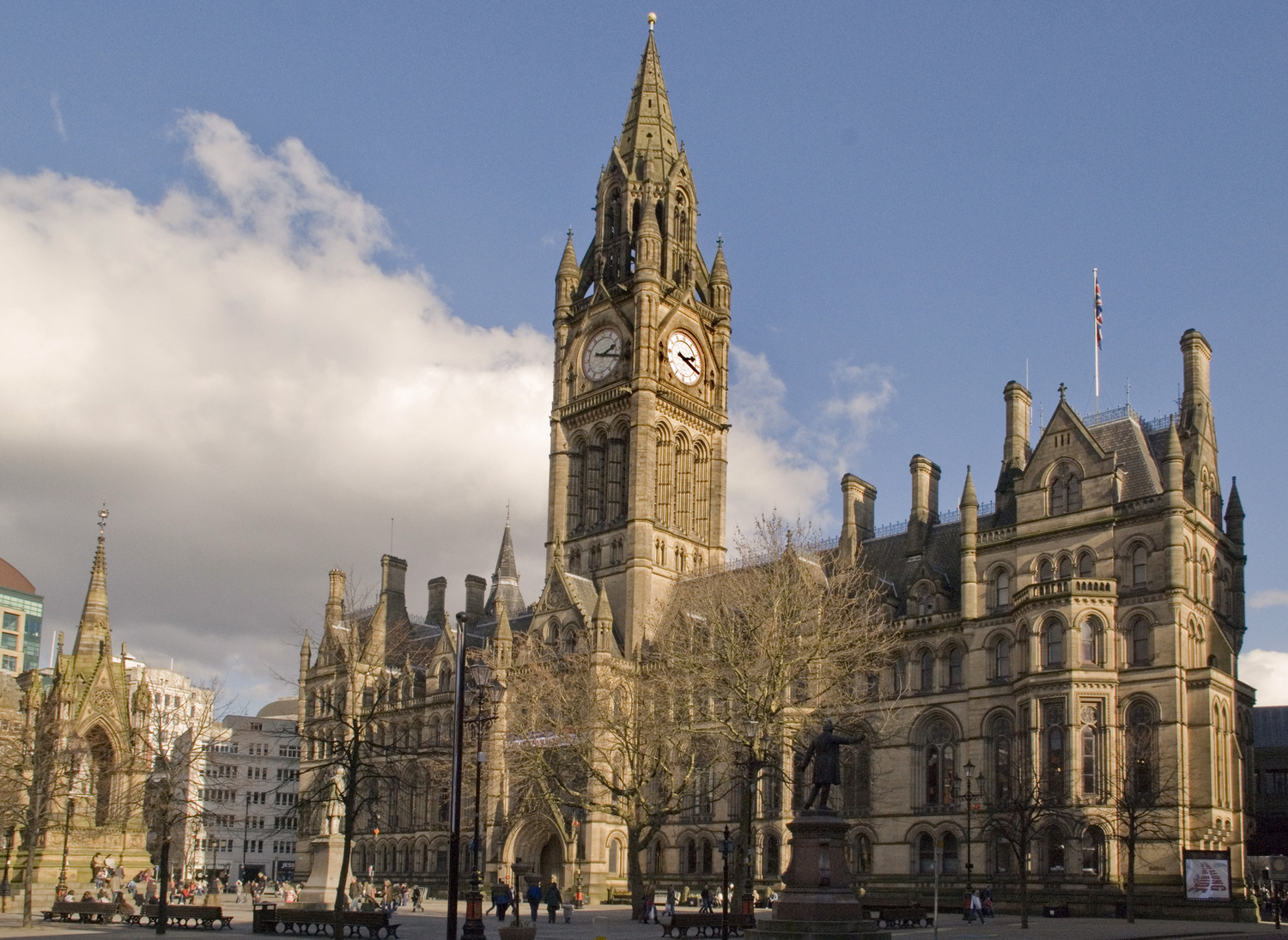
Manchester Town Hall

- 1 January – Queen Victoria is proclaimed Empress of India by the Royal Titles Act 1876.
- March – The Nineteenth Century magazine is founded in London.
- 8 March – in an explosion at Worcester Colliery, Swansea, 17 men are killed.
- 12 March – Britain annexes Walvis Bay in South Africa.
- 14 March – former Argentine dictator Juan Manuel de Rosas dies in exile in Southampton.
- 15 March – English cricket team in Australia and New Zealand in 1876–77: the first Test cricket match takes place between England and Australia.
- 22 March – the Society for the Protection of Ancient Buildings is established by William Morris and others meeting in Bloomsbury.
- 24 March – for the only time in history, the Boat Race between the Cambridge University and Oxford University Boat Clubs is declared a "dead heat" (i.e. a draw).
- 10 April – the first human cannonball act in the British Isles (and perhaps the world) is performed by 17-year-old Rossa Matilda Richter ("Zazel") at the London Royal Aquarium.
- 11 April – in the Tynewydd Colliery disaster in the Rhondda, 5 men are killed by flooding. 25 of the rescue team are awarded the Albert Medal for Lifesaving, the first time this is awarded for service on land, and the first BMA medal is also awarded.
- 12 April – Britain annexes the South African Republic, violating the Sand River Convention of 1852 causing a new Xhosa War.
- 24 April – six Scotch whisky distilleries combine to form Distillers Company.
- 30 April – the Diocese of St Albans is founded within the Church of England from part of the Diocese of Rochester. St Albans Abbey, which is undergoing extensive restoration at this time, is elevated to become St Albans Cathedral and on 12 June Thomas Legh Claughton is enthroned first Bishop of St Albans, an office he holds until 1890.
- 9–19 July – the All England Lawn Tennis and Croquet Club stages the first Wimbledon Championships in lawn tennis. Cricketer Spencer Gore becomes first Wimbledon gentlemen's singles champion (the only event held; the final is delayed by rain).
- 10 July – St John Ambulance Association established in England.
- 12 July – Prison Act 1877 transfers responsibility for provision of prisons from counties to the Home Office.
- 21 July – the Cabinet decides to declare war on Russia if it occupies Constantinople in the Russo-Turkish War.
- 10 August – the Universities of Oxford and Cambridge Act removes most restrictions limiting fellowships in colleges of the ancient universities to clergy of the Church of England and permits fellows to marry.
- 23 August – the Merchandise Marks Act obliges exporters to indicate the place of manufacture of their goods.
- 11 September – collision of two outward bound sailing ships, Shaw, Savill Line's Avalanche, bound from London to Wellington, New Zealand, and the North American Forest Queen, in ballast for New York, off the Isle of Portland; over 120 persons die from both ships with only 12 survivors.
- 13 September – new Manchester Town Hall, designed by Alfred Waterhouse, officially opened.
- 3 October – W. S. Gilbert's farce Engaged, starring Marion Terry, opens at London's Haymarket Theatre.
- 22 October – Blantyre mining disaster kills 207, Scotland's worst-ever mining accident.
- 24 November – Anna Sewell's novel Black Beauty published.
- 4 December – American suffragette Victoria Woodhull delivers her first public lecture in London after she and her sister Tennessee Claflin settle in England following their involvement in sensational legal cases in the United States.

=== Undated ===
- Annie Besant and Charles Bradlaugh, as the Freethought Publishing Company, publish for the first time in the UK Charles Knowlton's birth control manual Fruits of Philosophy, for which they are prosecuted (18 June) under the Obscene Publications Act 1857.
- Publication date of Edward Lear's Laughable Lyrics (actually issued December 1876).
- Euphemia Allan (as Arthur de Lulli) publishes the piano waltz "Chopsticks" (as "The Celebrated Chop Waltz") in Glasgow, aged 16.
- Jesse Boot takes over the family shop in Nottingham, the foundation of Boots the chemists.

== Births ==
- 7 February
  - G. H. Hardy, mathematician (died 1947)
  - Alfred Williams, poet (died 1930)
- 6 March – Rose Fyleman, English writer and poet (died 1957)
- 17 March – Edith New, suffragette (died 1951)
- 22 March – Sefton Brancker, Air Vice Marshal (died in R101 crash 1930)
- 15 April – William Mitchell-Thomson, 1st Baron Selsdon, politician (died 1938)
- 17 April – Lionel Pape, actor (died 1944)
- 16 May – Bernard Spilsbury, forensic pathologist (suicide 1947)
- 7 June – Charles Glover Barkla, physicist, Nobel Prize laureate (died 1944)
- 14 June – Ida Maclean, biochemist, first woman admitted to the London Chemical Society (died 1944)
- 19 July – Arthur Fielder, cricketer (died 1949)
- 1 August – Charlotte Hughes, longest-lived person ever documented in the United Kingdom (died 1993)
- 15 August – Laura Annie Willson, née Buckley, mechanical engineer and suffragette (died 1942)
- 27 August – Charles Rolls, motorist and aeronaut, co-founder of Rolls-Royce (died in aviation accident 1910)
- 1 September – Francis William Aston, chemist, Nobel Prize laureate (died 1945)
- 2 September – Frederick Soddy, chemist, Nobel Prize laureate (died 1956)
- 7 September – Ivy Williams, first woman called to the English bar (died 1966)
- 4 October – Razor Smith, cricketer (died 1946)
- 10 October – William Morris, founder of Morris Motors and philanthropist (died 1963)
- 27 October – George Thompson, cricketer (died 1943)
- 29 October – Wilfred Rhodes, cricketer (died 1973)
- 15 November – William Hope Hodgson, author (killed in action 1918)
- 25 November – Harley Granville-Barker, actor, playwright and critic (died 1946)

== Deaths ==
- 2 January – Alexander Bain, inventor (born 1811)
- 21 January – Sir Fairfax Moresby, admiral of the fleet (born 1786)
- 24 February – Thomas Thorp, Anglican priest, Archdeacon of Bristol (born 1797)
- 8 March – James Scott Bowerbank, naturalist and palaeontologist (born 1797)
- 24 March
  - Walter Bagehot, businessman, essayist and journalist (born 1826)
  - Jane Senior, social reformer (uterine cancer; born 1828)
- 25 March – Caroline Chisholm, humanitarian (born 1808)
- 8 May - Edmund Sharpe, architect, architectural historian, railway engineer, and sanitary reformer (born 1809)
- 26 May – Sir James Kay-Shuttleworth, educationist (born 1804)
- 14 June – Mary Carpenter, educational and social reformer (born 1807)
- 15 June – Caroline Norton, campaigner for married women's rights (born 1808)
- 14 July – Richard Davies, Welsh poet (born 1833)
- 27 July – John Frost, Welsh-born Chartist leader (born 1784)
- 8 August – William Lovett, Chartist leader (born 1800)
- 15 August – John Peter Gassiot, businessman and amateur scientist (born 1797)
- 17 September – William Fox Talbot, photographer (born 1800)
- 7 November – Calvert Jones, painter and pioneer photographer (born 1804)
- 18 December – James Ballantine, artist and author (born 1806)
- 23 December – Thomas Wright, antiquarian (born 1810)
