= Joan Newell =

British actress (1915–2012)

- Born: 19 February 1915; Steyning, Sussex, United Kingdom
- Died: 1 November 2012 (aged 97); Denville Hall, Northwood, London, United Kingdom
- Occupation: Actress
- Years active: 1946–1987 (film & TV)

Joan Newell (1915–2012) was a British actress primarily known for her television roles, but who also appeared in films and on stage. She co-starred with John Slater in the 1953 series Johnny, You're Wanted. Amongst her most prominent later roles was that of Meg Owen in the series The Doctors and its spinoff Owen, M.D..

== Selected filmography ==
=== Film ===
- It's Hard to Be Good (1948)
- To Dorothy a Son (1954)
- The Last Man to Hang (1956)
- The Devil's Pass (1957)
- Jigsaw (1962)
- Stolen Hours (1963)
- Live It Up! (1963)
- Keep It Up Downstairs (1976)

=== Television ===
- Johnny, You're Wanted (1953)
- Dixon of Dock Green (1956–65)
- Emergency-Ward 10 (1959–66)
- The Citadel (1960–61)
- The Escape of R.D.7 (1961)
- Dr. Finlay's Casebook (1962)
- Harpers West One (1963)
- Steptoe and Son (1963–65)
- No Hiding Place (1964)
- The Sullavan Brothers (1964)
- Danger Man (1965)
- The Newcomers (1965–66)
- Sergeant Cork (1966)
- Mrs Thursday (1966–67)
- Further Adventures of Lucky Jim (1967)
- The Saint (1968)
- Journey to the Unknown (1969)
- Parkin's Patch (1969)
- Strange Report (1969)
- Hadleigh (1969)
- The Doctors (1970–71)
- Owen, M.D. (1971–72)
- Crown Court (1973)
- The Kids from 47A (1973–74)
- The Cedar Tree (1976–77)
- Juliet Bravo (1980)
- Terry and June (1981)

== Bibliography ==
- Baskin, Ellen . Serials on British Television, 1950–1994. Scolar Press, 1996.
- Perry, Chris. The Kaleidoscope British Christmas Television Guide 1937–2013. 2017.
- Wearing, J.P. The London Stage 1950–1959: A Calendar of Productions, Performers, and Personnel. Rowman & Littlefield, 2014.
