= Five Names for Johnny =

1950 British television mystery series

Five Names for Johnny is a 1957 mystery serial written by Lewis Greifer, which was produced by ATV and aired on ITV. Cast included Conrad Phillips, Norman Wooland, and Patricia Marmont. It is a half-hour series. The 7-part serial still exists in the archives.

== See also ==
- The Man Who Finally Died
- The Voodoo Factor
- The Gentle Killers
- Motive for Murder
