= Spaceflight IC-1 =

1967 British film by Bernard Knowles

- Original film poster
- Directed by: Bernard Knowles
- Written by: Henry Cross
- Produced by: Robert Lippert; Jack Parsons
- Starring: Bill Williams; Norma West; John Cairney
- Cinematography: Geoffrey Faithfull
- Edited by: Robert Winter; Colin Miller
- Music by: Elisabeth Lutyens; Philip Martell
- Production company: Lippert Films
- Distributed by: 20th Century Fox
- Release dates: October 1965 (USA); July 1967 (UK)
- Running time: 65 minutes
- Country: United Kingdom
- Language: English

Spaceflight IC-1 (also known as Spaceflight IC-1: An Adventure in Space) is a 1965 British science-fiction film directed by Bernard Knowles and starring Bill Williams and Norma West. It was written by Harry Spalding (as Henry Cross) and produced by Robert L. Lippert. The civilised world is controlled by an all-powerful computerised government which sends colonists into space.

== Plot summary ==
In 2015, spaceship IC-1 (Interstellar Colony #1) travels toward a planet similar to Earth to explore the possibility it could solve the Earth's population problems. The crew comprises Captain Mead Ralston, his wife Jan, Drs. Steven and Helen Thomas, two other married couples, and four people – "animates" – in suspended animation. One year into the voyage, Helen is found to have a fatal pancreatic infection that can only be cured if the ship returns to Earth, but Ralston refuses to turn back. When he denies her permission to have another child, she commits suicide.

Steven Thomas and some of the other crew members mutiny and imprison Ralston. He escapes and forces the crew to obey him by threatening to destroy the ship. Ignoring the crew's warnings, he releases one of the "animates" who kills him before dying of complications from the thawing-out process. The ship goes on under Thomas's leadership.

== Cast ==
- Bill Williams as Capt. Mead Ralston
- Norma West as Jan Ralston
- John Cairney as Dr. Steven Thomas
- Jeremy Longhurst as John Saunders, Chief Engineer
- Donald Churchill as Carl Wolcott
- Kathleen Breck as Kate Saunders
- Margo McLennan as Joyce Wolcott (credited as Margo Mayne)
- Linda Marlowe as Dr. Helen Thomas
- John Lee as Dr. Garth
- Andrew Downie as Capt. Burnett (spacestation)
- Mark Lester as Don Saunders
- Stuart Middleton as Michael Thomas
- Anthony Honour as Robert Wolcott
- Tony Doonan as Dr. Griffith
- Chuck Julian as Webster

== Production ==
The film was shot in England at Shepperton Studios. It was one of several films that Robert L. Lippert made with Jack Parsons in England. Writer Harry Spalding said the film was inspired by space exploration at the time: "There was a lot of talk back then that if people were ever having to go to fly to Mars they'd have to be frozen for the trip and revived when they got there."

== Reception ==
The Monthly Film Bulletin wrote: "Bold enough to eschew the joys of planet exploration, dinosaurs and cat-women (its entire story unfolds within the cramped confines of a spaceship), Spaceflight IC-1 unfortunately has no alternative to offer except dreary dialogue and indifferent acting. As usual in this sort of affair, much is made of the fact that there have been exhaustive tests to select personnel capable of withstanding the strain of interstellar travel; and as usual, a more unbalanced, hysteria-prone lot would be hard to imagine."

Kine Weekly wrote: "Story untidy and script too serious, action reasonable, acting sound. Acceptable support."

Variety wrote: "The Robert L. Lippert production is thin in the story, acting, directing and production value departments ... Harry Spalding's script had the germ of an excellent story of the genuine horror of a future civilization based on computer-programmed lives. ... Combination of elements have defeated the impact of the film, including traditional British underplaying – okay in contemporary situations – which in futuristic melodrama simply amounts to flat throwaway of dialog and b&w lensing give little visual interest. Technical credits are adequate."

Film historian Brian McFarlane called the film "The nadir of Knowles’s directing career," writing: "The functions of an assorted crew, under the dictatorial leadership of Captain Mead Ralston (US actor Bill Williams), are identified by chest-labels that indicate Psychology, Botany, Education, etc. Such labels are all the more necessary because the actors fail to bring their wearers to life or to distinguish otherwise between the four interchangeable married couples ... Williams offers a study in unrelieved grimness and the married others are given little to work on in Harry Spalding’s screenplay. ... Williams, who had a long career in film and television, is so devoid of character interest here as to make one wonder why anyone supposed that bringing him to Britain would improve the film’s box-office chances."
