= 1957 in British music =

This is a summary of 1957 in music in the United Kingdom, including the official charts from that year.

== Events ==
- 1 January – Benjamin Britten conducts the opening performance of his ballet The Prince of the Pagodas at Covent Garden.
- 11 January – Tommy Steele reaches no 1 in the UK chart with his cover of "Singing the Blues", thus achieving chart-topping success before his American rival Elvis Presley.
- 16 January – The Cavern Club opens in Liverpool as a jazz club.
- 25 January – First performance of William Walton's Cello Concerto in Boston.
- 3 March – Patricia Bredin represents the UK at the 2nd Eurovision Song Contest in Frankfurt, finishing in 7th place. It is the first time the UK has entered the competition.
- June – Kay Kendall, star of Les Girls, marries Rex Harrison, star of My Fair Lady.
- 6 July – John Lennon and Paul McCartney of The Beatles first meet at a garden fete at St. Peter's Church, Woolton, Liverpool, at which Lennon's skiffle group, The Quarrymen, is playing (and in the graveyard of which an Eleanor Rigby is buried).
- 7 August – The Quarrymen first play at The Cavern Club in Liverpool in an interlude spot between jazz bands; when John Lennon starts the group playing Elvis Presley's "Don't Be Cruel", the club's owner at this time hands him a note reading "Cut out the bloody rock 'n roll".

== Charts ==
- See UK No.1 Hits of 1957

== Classical music: new works ==
- Malcolm Arnold – The River Kwai March, Toy Symphony
- Arthur Bliss – Discourse for orchestra
- Benjamin Britten – Songs from the Chinese Op. 58, for soprano or tenor and guitar
- Gordon Jacob – Piano Concerto No. 2
- Robin Orr – Rhapsody for string orchestra
- Edmund Rubbra – Symphony No 7
- Michael Tippett – Symphony No. 2
- William Walton – Partita for Orchestra
- Grace Williams – Symphony No 2

== Opera ==
- Benjamin Britten – Noye's Fludde (composition draft completed 18 December).

== Film and Incidental music ==
- Richard Addinsell – The Prince and the Showgirl directed by and starring Laurence Olivier, co-starring Marilyn Monroe.
- John Addison –
  - The Entertainer – opening 10 April at the Royal Court Theatre, London.
  - Lucky Jim directed by John Boulting, starring Ian Carmichael, Terry-Thomas and Hugh Griffith.
- Malcolm Arnold –
  - Blue Murder at St Trinian's, starring Terry-Thomas, George Cole, Joyce Grenfell, Lionel Jeffries and Richard Wattis.
  - The Bridge on the River Kwai directed by David Lean, starring William Holden, Jack Hawkins, Alec Guinness and Sessue Hayakawa.
- James Bernard –
  - Across the Bridge, starring Rod Steiger and Bernard Lee.
  - The Curse of Frankenstein directed by Terence Fisher, starring Peter Cushing and Christopher Lee.
- Stanley Black – The Naked Truth, starring Terry-Thomas, Peter Sellers and Dennis Price.
- Muir Mathieson – Campbell's Kingdom, starring Dirk Bogarde and Stanley Baker.
- Clifton Parker – Night of the Demon directed by Jacques Tourneur, starring Dana Andrews, Peggy Cummins and Niall MacGinnis.
- Humphrey Searle –
  - The Abominable Snowman directed by Val Guest, starring Peter Cushing.
  - The Passionate Stranger, starring Margaret Leighton and Ralph Richardson.

== Musical theatre ==
- 11 April – Zuleika, with music by Peter Tranchell and book and lyrics by James Ferman receives its West End première at the Saville Theatre, starring Diane Cilento in the title role.

== Musical films ==
- Let's Be Happy, starring Vera-Ellen
- The Tommy Steele Story
- These Dangerous Years, starring Frankie Vaughan

== Births ==
- 20 January – Andy Sheppard, saxophonist and composer
- 27 January – Janick Gers, guitarist and songwriter
- 3 February – Steven Stapleton, singer-songwriter (Nurse with Wound and Current 93)
- 13 February – Tony Butler English bass player (Big Country and On the Air)
- 28 February – Phil Gould, drummer, singer and songwriter (Level 42)
- 21 March – John Whitfield, conductor
- 26 March – Paul Morley, music journalist
- 20 May – Sid Vicious, punk musician (died 1979)
- 27 May – Siouxsie Sioux, singer
- 29 May – Big George, composer, bandleader, and broadcaster (died 2011)
- 7 June – Paddy McAloon, English singer-songwriter (Prefab Sprout)
- 21 June – Mark Brzezicki, drummer (Big Country, The Cult, Ultravox, and Procol Harum)
- 24 June – Astro, rapper (UB40)
- 3 July – Poly Styrene, punk musician (died 2011)
- 11 July – Peter Murphy, singer-songwriter (Bauhaus and Dalis Car)
- 18 July – Keith Levene, English guitarist, songwriter, and producer (Public Image Ltd, The Flowers of Romance, and The Clash) (died 2022)
- 31 August – Glenn Tilbrook, singer, songwriter and guitarist (Squeeze)
- 11 September – Jon Moss, drummer
- 11 November – Tony 'Gad' Robinson, singer (Aswad)
- 20 December – Billy Bragg, singer-songwriter

== Deaths ==
- 5 January – Gertie Gitana, music hall entertainer, 69
- 21 January – Harry Gordon, entertainer, 63
- 13 March – Lena Ashwell, entertainer, 84
- 12 May – Marie Rappold, operatic soprano, 83
- 1 August – Cathal O'Byrne, singer and poet, 90
- 18 August – Louis Levy, film composer, 62
- 1 September – Dennis Brain, horn virtuoso, 36 (car accident)
- 20 October – Jack Buchanan, singer, dancer, actor and director, 66
- 19 November – Gordon Bryan, pianist, 62
- 21 December – Eric Coates, composer, 71
- date unknown
  - William Henley, violinist, composer and arranger
  - Jack Robson, songwriter

== See also ==
- 1957 in British television
- 1957 in the United Kingdom
- List of British films of 1957
