= Joan Rhodes =

British strongwoman (1921–2010)

- Born: 13 April 1921; London, England
- Died: 30 May 2010 (aged 89)
- Occupations: Performer; strongwoman; stuntwoman; wrestler

Joan Rhodes (13 April 1921 – 30 May 2010) was a British performer, wrestler, stuntwoman and strongwoman. Born into poverty in London, she and her siblings were deserted by their parents. Following unhappy spells in the workhouse and with an aunt, she left home at 14. After sleeping rough in Brewer Street in Soho, she joined a travelling fair, where she got the idea for her act after seeing a professional strongman at work.

== With Bob Hope ==
She began as a variety and cabaret performer during the 1950s and '60s. Her popularity increased due to her early appearances on television shows in the US and UK, including Ed Sullivan's The Toast of the Town (1955) and the Bob Hope Christmas Show. It was in the latter that, on stage in Iceland on 27 December 1955, Rhodes lifted, then accidentally dropped, Bob Hope, while entertaining troops for the USO.

== Stunts ==
As a stunt performer, she worked on films, including Fanny by Gaslight (1944). She appeared as herself performing some of her strength feats in the Vernon Sewell-directed crime caper Johnny, You're Wanted (1956). She also appeared in Burke & Hare (1972), The Pink Panther Strikes Again (1976) and The Elephant Man (1980).

== Autobiography ==
Her autobiography, Coming on Strong, was published in 2007. In her later years, she ran a small café in Crouch Hill just down the road from the Mountview Theatre School (now moved) and she was popular with its students.

== Death ==
Joan Rhodes died on 30 May 2010, aged 89. On 11 June 2010, BBC Radio 4 in its Last Word programme, covered her life with anecdotes from Roy Hudd, who had known her well.

== Legacy ==
During a fifth season episode of the BBC TV programme The Repair Shop that aired 13 December 2019, Triona Palmer, a friend of Joan Rhodes, brought in one of Rhodes's sequined stage costumes to be restored by embroidery specialist Sara Dennis.

Rhodes was the subject of BBC Radio 4's Great Lives, first broadcast on 24 May 2022

== Filmography ==
- Burke & Hare (1972) - Hairy Mary
- The Pink Panther Strikes Again (1976) - Daphne
- The Elephant Man (1980) - Cook
