= David Shute =

British journalist

David Shute is a British journalist, best known for his work at the BBC.

== Career ==
Shute was educated at Brentwood School in Essex. While working on newspapers in Reading he was auditioned by the BBC in Bristol and immediately signed on contract. He made a reputation for engaging in adventurous broadcasts such as deep sea diving, riding on the back of a Royal Artillery motorcycle during a display and, while covering a story on the changing face of circus life, going on the flying trapeze. David Shute was the first person to broadcast live to the UK while travelling through the sound barrier. He is regularly on BBC Radio Four's Today programme. As a reporter he covered conflicts in Borneo and Sarawak which resulted in the Radio Four programme The Quiet Confrontation, produced by Roy Hayward. He also covered the troubles in Aden and the Radfan.

He was promoted to the post of Senior Talks Producer at the BBC's Pebble Mill studios. There he built a reputation for mounting outside broadcasts. He maintained a productive association with the Royal Shakespeare Company at Stratford upon Avon and worked with actors including Ian Richardson, Richard Pasco and Margaret Tyzack. He directed Richardson's memorable radio performance of Nevil Shute's Requiem for a Wren, which was featured as a Book at Bedtime. He gave David Suchet his first broadcast job, reading a "Morning Story".

Outside the BBC he wrote and produced Warwick Castle Mediaeval Banquet, which ran for more than 17 years. He later founded a Production Company specialising in Video and Conference Production.

== Retirement ==
Living in retirement in Spain, Shute works as a lecturer on cruise ships covering such topics as "broadcasting" and "the musical theatre", accompanied by recordings of his work as a reporter. Ashore he finds himself in demand as an after dinner speaker.
