= Owen, M.D. =

1971 British TV series

- Genre: Drama
- Written by: Brian Finch; William Emms et al
- Directed by: Tristan de Vere Cole; Ronald Wilson; Robert Knights et al
- Starring: Nigel Stock; Joan Newell; Alan Moore
- Opening theme: Sleepy Shores
- Country of origin: United Kingdom
- Original language: English
- No. of series: 2
- No. of episodes: 61 (50 missing)

Production
- Running time: Series 1 – 25 minutes Series 2 – 50 minutes

Original release
- Network: BBC1
- Release: 22 September 1971 – 17 June 1973

Owen, M.D. is a BBC 1 television series that ran from 1971 to 1973. It centres on the eponymous lead character's new country practice, following his departure from The Doctors, which is set in north London.

Two-part stories aired in the 7 p.m. slot every Wednesday and Thursday for six months, "a strange mixture of corn and ham", according to TV critic Patrick Campbell, "intended to catch the Crossroads audience that thrives on cliches and stock situations". The second series, in 1973, consists of nine 50-minute episodes broadcast on Sunday evenings.

The theme music to the programme - "Sleepy Shores" by the Johnny Pearson Orchestra - spent 15 weeks in the UK charts between late 1971 and early 1972, peaking at No.8. Of the run, 50 episodes have not survived, and five of the remainder only exist as monochrome Telerecordings.

== Cast ==
=== Main / regular ===
- Nigel Stock as Dr Thomas Owen
- Joan Newell as Meg Owen
- Alan Moore as Dr Jim Fletcher
- Maggie Hanley as Laura Hunter
- Ann Penfold as Heather Mason

=== Guests ===
- Mary Ann Severne as Sister

== Episodes ==
=== Series One (Sept 1971–March 1972) ===
No.	Episode	Broadcast	Notes
1	I Love You But /1	15 September 1971	
2	I Love You But /2	16 September 1971	
3	The Town Mouse /1	22 September 1971	
4	The Town Mouse /2	23 September 1971	
5	The Whole Hog /1	29 September 1971	
6	The Whole Hog /2	30 September 1971	
7	Happy Family /1	6 October 1971	
8	Happy Family /2	7 October 1971	
9	A Little Place in the Country /1	13 October 1971	
10	A Little Place in the Country /2	14 October 1971	
11	The Long Days of Summer /1	20 October 1971	
12	The Long Days of Summer /2	21 October 1971	
13	The Birdwatcher /1	27 October 1971	
14	The Birdwatcher /2	28 October 1971	
15	Simple Simon /1	3 November 1971	
16	Simple Simon /2	4 November 1971	
17	Where There's Smoke /1	10 November 1971	
18	Where There's Smoke /1	11 November 1971	
19	Alison /1	17 November 1971	Exists b&w
20	Alison /2	18 November 1971	Exists b&w
21	The Weekenders /1	24 November 1971	
22	The Weekenders /1	25 November 1971	
23	On the Parish /1	1 December 1971	
24	On the Parish /2	2 December 1971	
25	The Bees /1	8 December 1971	
26	The Bees /2	9 December 1971	
27	A Country Pursuit /1	15 December 1971	
28	A Country Pursuit /2	16 December 1971	
29	The Kingfisher /1	22 December 1971	
30	The Kingfisher /2	23 December 1971	
31	Threadbare Harvest /1	29 December 1971	
32	Threadbare Harvest /2	30 December 1971	
33	The Return /1	5 January 1972	
34	The Return /2	6 January 1972	
35	Black Sheep /1	12 January 1972	
36	Black Sheep /2	13 January 1972	
37	Comings and Goings /1	19 January 1972	
38	Comings and Goings /2	20 January 1972	
39	God's Acre /1	26 January 1972	
40	God's Acre /2	27 January 1972	
41	The VIPs /1	2 February 1972	
42	The VIPs /2	3 February 1972	
43	It Never Rains /1	9 February 1972	
44	It Never Rains /2	10 February 1972	
45	Saddler's Challenge /1	16 February 1972	
46	Saddler's Challenge /2	17 February 1972	
47	Ancient Enemy /1	23 February 1972	
48	Ancient Enemy /2	24 February 1972	
49	Way of Life /1	1 March 1972	
50	Way of Life /2	2 March 1972	
51	Snowfall /1	8 March 1972	
52	Snowfall /2	9 March 1972	

=== Series Two (April 1973–June 1973) ===
No.	Episode	Broadcast	Notes
1	Water Under the Bridge	22 April 1973	Exists
2	The Witch of Addington	29 April 1973	Exists
3	Father of the Man	6 May 1973	Exists
4	September Song	13 May 1973	Exists
5	An Officially Hot Day	20 May 1973	Exists
6	You Don't Get Me	27 May 1973	Exists b&w
7	The Love Game	3 June 1973	Exists b&w
8	Into Panic	10 June 1973	Exists b&w
9	Long Voyage Home	17 June 1973	Exists
