= Our Miss Pemberton =

British TV drama series (1957–1958)

Our Miss Pemberton is a British television programme which aired on the BBC from 1957 to 1958. A drama, it was about life in a small town. All 56 episodes were broadcast live and no telerecordings appear to have survived, leaving them lost.

It starred Margot Boyd, James Clifton, Aimée Delamain, Vincent Goodman and Terence Soall.
