= Escape (British TV series) =

1957 BBC TV anthology series

Escape is a 30-minute British television anthology series about escapes from German prisoner of war camps during World War II. The series was produced by and aired on the BBC in 1957. It was adapted from Aidan Crawley's book Escape from Germany 1939–1945.

Morris Barry directed the filmed inserts, while Ronald Eyre directed the studio sequences. Among its guest stars were Michael Caine and Roy Dotrice. As usual for the period, it was transmitted live; no recordings are known to survive.
