= The Gentle Killers =

1957 British TV series

The Gentle Killers is a 1957 television serial. The six-part half-hour series was produced by ATV and aired on ITV. Cast included Tony Church and Hazel Court. It was written by Lewis Greifer and Leigh Vance. There is very scarce information on this series online, even though (unlike many British series of the era) the episodes still exist in the archives.

== See also ==
- The Man Who Finally Died
- Five Names for Johnny
- The Voodoo Factor
- Motive for Murder
