= Toddlers' Truce =

British TV scheduling policy (1946–1957)

The Toddlers' Truce was an early British television scheduling policy that required transmissions to terminate for an hour each weekday between 6.00pm and 7.00pm – after the end of children's broadcasting and the start of the evening programmes – so that young children could be put to bed. The policy lasted throughout the post-war period until 16 February 1957. It was named after toddlers, children aged between 12 and 36 months.

== Background ==
The Toddlers' Truce policy may have originated when the BBC resumed television after the end of World War II on 7 June 1946. The policy remained fairly uncontroversial until ITV began broadcasting on 22 September 1955: at that time, the Truce was accepted as policy by the Postmaster General, the Earl De La Warr, in the interests of smoothing relations between ITV and the fledgling Independent Television Authority.

The problem became apparent in 1956, when the franchise holders under the ITA's jurisdiction were struggling to stay in business. As the BBC was (and is) funded by a television licence fee, its budget was not related to the number of hours of transmission. Indeed, the Truce saved them money. ITV on the other hand, was funded entirely by advertising, and the Truce caused a loss of revenue in the hour's closedown. Supporters of ITV, which had faced strong political opposition, argued that the Truce had little to do with social responsibility, and was simply a way to give the BBC an unfair advantage.

== Abolition ==
The ITA had encouraged the four major companies (Granada, ABC, ATV and Associated-Rediffusion) to seek abolition of the Truce. Action was taken finally in July 1956, probably the result of a lack of effective cooperation between the companies, rather than political objection. The Postmaster General, Charles Hill disliked the policy as an example of the BBC's paternalism toward its audience:

This restriction seemed to me absurd and I said so. It was the responsibility of parents, not the state, to put their children to bed at the right time... I invited the BBC and the ITA to agree to its abolition...

The BBC could not be persuaded to accept the abolition, or even to a compromise of reducing the period to 30 minutes. Hill tired of the disagreement, and asked Parliament for the abolition which was agreed on 31 October 1956. However, the BBC and ITA could not even agree a date for the abolition to take place, while Hill decided on Saturday 16 February 1957.

== Later use of the timeslot ==
The BBC filled the hour from the first Saturday with a music programme called Six-Five Special, and from Monday to Friday with the Tonight news magazine. It continued to cease broadcasts between 6.15pm and 7.00pm on Sundays at the time of evening church services, until Songs of Praise was launched on 1 October 1961. Until 1992, this time on Sundays was used for various religious programmes on BBC1 and ITV.

The slot between 6.00pm and 7.00pm has since been devoted to national and international news, along with regional news, in the weekday schedules of both BBC1 and ITV, although Crossroads was also shown in this period by most ITV regions.

== See also ==
- 1946 in British television
- 1957 in British television
- Timeline of the BBC Television Service
- Timeline of ITV

== Sources ==
=== Further reading ===
- Sendall, Bernard Independent Television in Britain: Volume 1 - Origin and Foundation 1946-62 London: The Macmillan Press Ltd 1982 ISBN 0-333-30941-3, Chapter 30ii: "The End of the Toddlers' Truce"
