= Stevie Spring =

British media executive

Stephanie Spring CBE (born 10 June 1957) is a British media executive. In January 2024 she was announced as the new chair of PRS for Music, the United Kingdom's music copyright collective for songwriters, composers and publishers. She has previously been chair of the British Council and the mental health charity Mind.

After graduating with a law degree, Spring joined Alpine Group as a marketing manager in 1978. In 1982, she became part of the team that launch the breakfast television station TV-am, before working in advertising management. She was chief executive officer of ClearChannel from 1999 to 2006, and CEO of Future plc from 2006 to 2012, becoming one of only a few women to chair a public listed company at the time. She was honoured at the 2010 Women of the Year Lunch. She was also Chair of the BBC's Children in Need. She chaired the British Council from 2019 to December 2022, and was appointed chair of Mind's board of trustees in 2018. Her appointment to PRS for Music, where she will succeed outgoing chair Stephen Davidson, was announced in January 2024. She will take up the role at the organisation's annual general meeting. She has been a non-executive director of The Co-operative Group since June 2015, and was re-elected to that role in 2018. She will reach the end of her nine-year term in 2024.

Spring was appointed CBE in the 2017 Birthday Honours for services to charity and in her role as chair of Children in Need. She has also been named by The Telegraph as one of Britain's 500 most influential people and by GQ Magazine as one of the UK's 100 most connected women.
