= Jacquie de Creed =

- Born: 1957
- Died: 17 June 2011 (aged 54); Mont Agel, France
- Occupation: Stunt performer
- Spouse: James Balmer
- Children: 2

Jacqueline Balmer (1957 – 17 June 2011), known professionally as Jacquie de Creed, was an English stuntwoman and presenter, and holder of the Long Distance Car Ramp Jump Record. During the 1980s she became famous in the United Kingdom for staging a series of spectacular car stunts. Along with her husband, de Creed was killed in an air crash while flying through dense fog en route from Italy to the French town of Troyes.

== Career ==
She began her stunt-performing career in the 1970s, appearing on television on numerous occasions, including the BBC television series Disaster Squad, but she was to become a household name after getting into the Guinness Book of Records with a 1983 car ramp jump at Santa Pod Raceway in a 1969 Ford Mustang which had been specially adapted for the occasion. De Creed set the record for Long Distance Car Ramp Jump at 232 feet (71 m) having approached the jumping ramp at 140 mph.

Her career was defined by a series of dramatic stunts. On one notable occasion while attempting to jump a line of vehicles in a Chevrolet Camaro (also at Santa Pod), she fell short of the target, wrecking the car and almost killing herself. She later recalled in her biography that it was "probably the most spectacular car crash ever filmed from which the female driver lived to tell the tale". The Daily Telegraph reports that in a short biography on her website, de Creed is said to have been "one of only a few people in Britain" who could drive a car on its side, balanced on two wheels.

She also made television commercials for Bovril and Heinz and, according to the Birmingham-based Sunday Mercury newspaper, gave driving lessons to a number of television presenters before retiring in 2005 to become a drama teacher. According to BBC News, she later worked as a presenter and became an after-dinner speaker. At the time of her death, de Creed was at work on an autobiography, entitled Close to the Edge, with her long term stunt partner Dick Sheppard.

== Death ==
On the morning of 17 June 2011, de Creed and her husband, James Balmer, took off in their twin engine Piper PA-39 aircraft shortly after 0800 UTC (1000 CET), for a flight from Lucca, Italy, to Troyes, France, following a holiday. Both were experienced pilots, and usually flew separately, but had decided on this occasion to travel together. Flying through an area enveloped by dense fog, the plane, piloted by James Balmer, lost radar contact at 0928 UTC (1128 CET). A full scale search and rescue operation was launched shortly after midday local time after a resident reported a plane flying at "very low altitude". The wreckage of the aircraft – together with the bodies of the couple – was subsequently found on Mont Agel, north of Monaco later the same day at 1345 UTC. Their identities were established through mobile phone records.

== Personal life ==
Jacquie de Creed was married to James Balmer, a former rally driver who owned a menswear shop, and lived in Cirencester, Gloucestershire. Together they had two daughters, Charlotte and Lucy.
