= Night Train to Surbiton =

1965 British TV thriller series

Night Train to Surbiton was a 1965 British television thriller mini-series aired on the BBC. Cast included Peter Jones, Nicholas Parsons, Eleanor Summerfield, and Christine Finn. All six episodes are missing, believed lost.
