= Motive for Murder =

1957 British television drama

Motive for Murder is a 1957 British documentary television drama. The six-part thriller serial was produced by ATV and aired on ITV. The half-hour series was written by Jimmy Sangster. Cast included Vincent Ball, Gene Anderson, Geoffrey Chater, and Victor Brooks. Unlike many British television series of the era, it still exists in the archives.

== Characters ==
- John Blackmoor — Vincent Ball
- Jean Blackmoor — Gene Anderson
- Harry Manners — Geoffrey Chater
- Det. Insp. Wrigley — Victor Brooks
- Sgt. Martin — Humphrey Morton
- Miss Douglas — Barbara Lott
- Dr Meinster — Michael Ashwin
- Miss Gosling — Betty Baskcomb
- Dave Acton — Patrick Connor
- Frimley — John Harvey
- Policewoman — Pearl Catlin

== Episodes ==
- The Homecoming
- The Man Named Jacques
- The Clay Pigeon
- The Doctor
- The Face on the Photograph
- The Man Named Joe

== Premise ==
A man sets out to clear himself of murder by finding the real murderer.

== See also ==
- Five Names for Johnny
- The Gentle Killers
- The Man Who Finally Died
- The Voodoo Factor
