= The Devil's Pass =

1957 British film by Darcy Conyers

- Directed by: Darcy Conyers
- Written by: Darcy Conyers
- Produced by: Darcy Conyers; David Henley
- Starring: John Slater; Joan Newell
- Cinematography: S.D. Onions
- Edited by: Helen Wiggins
- Music by: Philip Green
- Production company: Darcy Conyers Productions
- Distributed by: Associated British-Pathé
- Release date: April 1957
- Running time: 56 minutes
- Country: United Kingdom
- Language: English

The Devil's Pass is a 1957 British drama film directed and written by Darcy Conyers and starring John Slater and Joan Newell.

== Plot ==
Hard-up Bill Buckle has had to sell his fishing boat. The new owners plan to wreck it in a dangerous channel called the "Devil's Pass", but Bil and a stowaway, Jim, manage navigate the abandoned boat through the channel and bring her home safely. With the salvage money Bill is finally able to marry his girlfriend Jan.

== Cast ==
- John Slater as Bill Buckle
- Christopher Warbey as Jim
- Joan Newell as Nan Trewney
- Charles Leno as headmaster
- Joy Rodgers as kitchen maid
- Richard George as Ted Trelawney
- Archie Duncan as George Jolly
- Ewen Solon as Job Jolly
- Clem Listeras Grunt Jolly
- Peter Martyn as Mr. Smith
- Martin Wyldeck as young master
- Diana Hope as pretty girl
- Bart Allison as Watkins
- Frank Hawkins as man in pub
- Roger Slater as 1st. boy
- Jeremy Moray as 2nd boy
- Ernest Lister as Harry

== Production ==
It was produced at Kensington Studios in London. The film's sets were designed by the art director Ken Adam.

== Reception ==
The Monthly Film Bulletin wrote: "Very well photographed (at Brixham, Devon) and including scenes at the British Seaman's Orphan Boys' Home, this is an unpretentious but agreeable film. Despite the limitations of heavy sentimentality and a rather stilted script, it has an unconventional and characteristic charm."

Picturegoer wrote: "All highly improbable."

In British Sound Films: The Studio Years 1928–1959 David Quinlan rated the film as "mediocre", writing: "agreeable most improbable. Shot in Brixham, Devon."
