= Timeline of Jodrell Bank Observatory =

This is a timeline of Jodrell Bank Observatory.

== 1930s ==
- 1939 — Jodrell Bank site purchased by the University of Manchester as a botany field station.

== 1940s ==
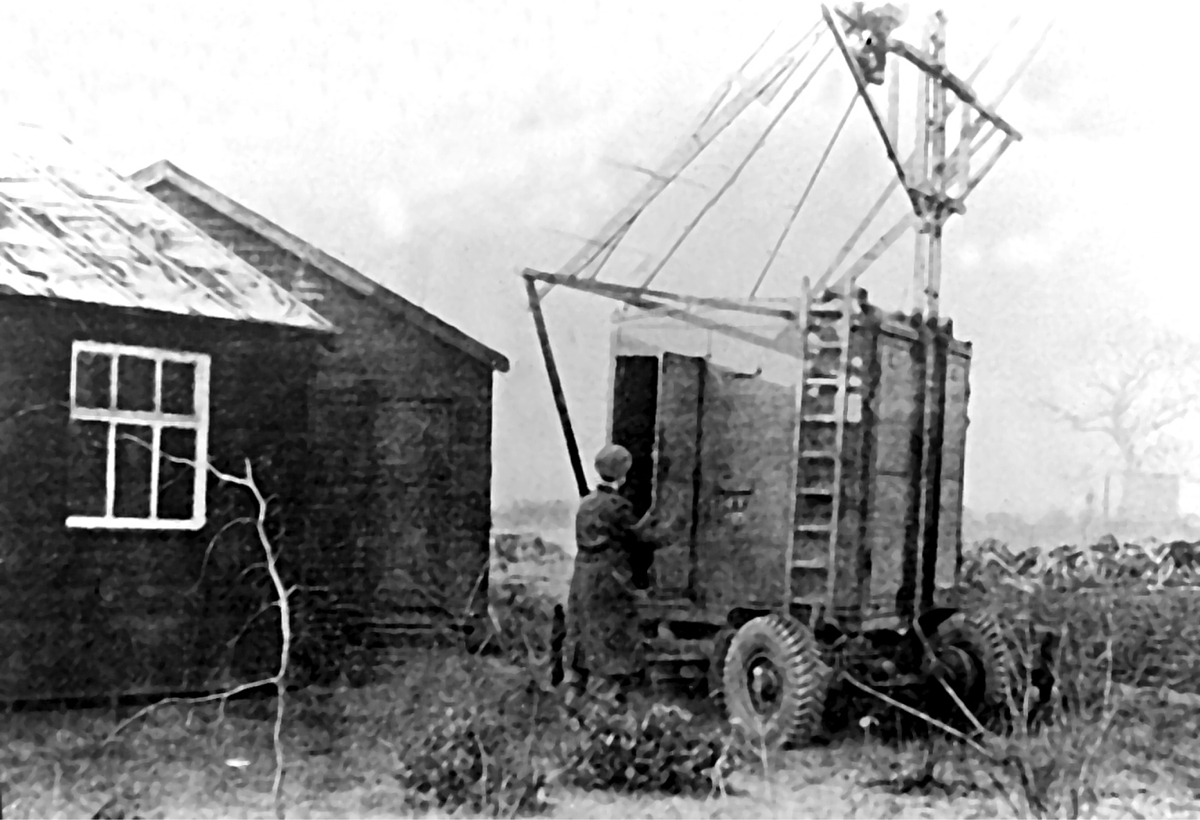
Observations at Jodrell Bank in 1945.

- 1945, December — Bernard Lovell arrives at Jodrell Bank with several trailers of radar equipment from World War II.
- 1947 — The 66 meter Transit Telescope is constructed.

== 1950s ==
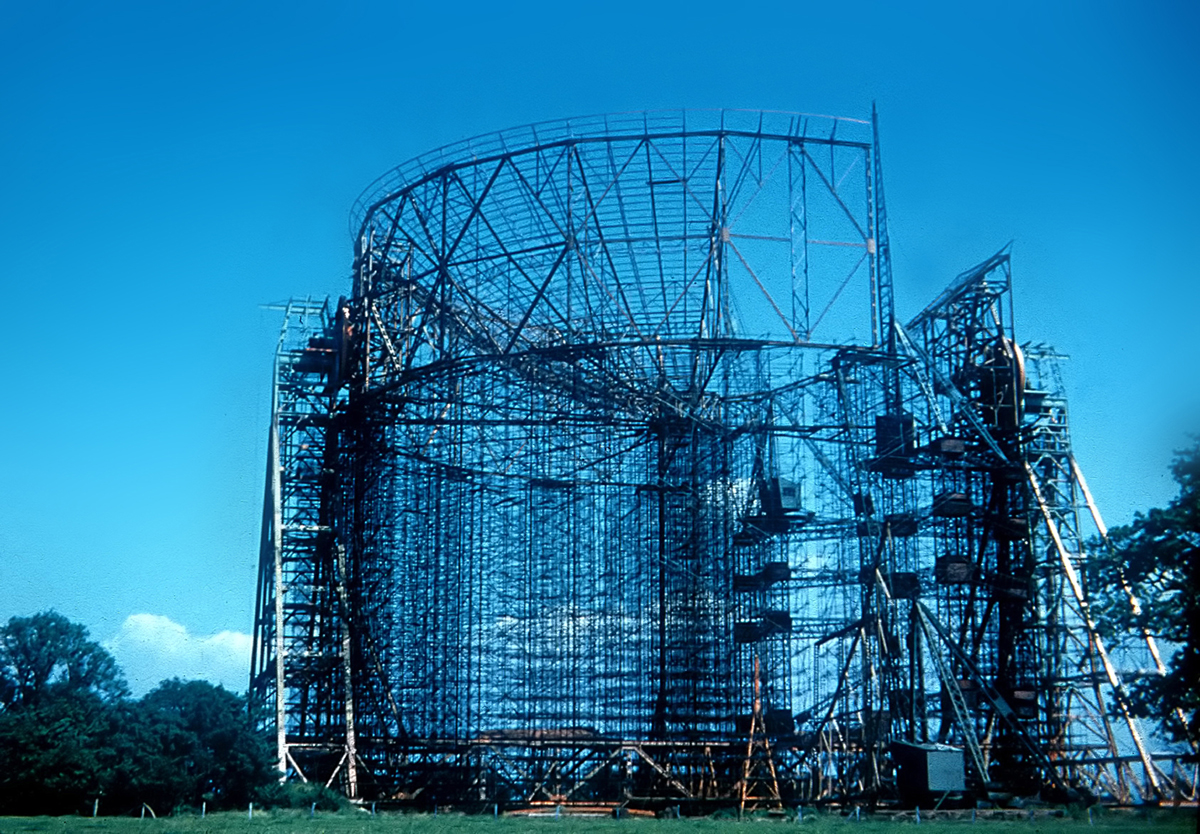
The Mark 1 under construction.

- 1950, August — The transit telescope is used to make the first detection of radio waves from the nearby Andromeda Galaxy.
- 1950 — Charles Husband presents first drawings of the proposed giant, fully steerable radio telescope.
- 1952, September — Construction of the Mark I telescope begins.
- 1957, October — The Mark I telescope becomes operational. It tracks the carrier rocket of Sputnik 1; the only telescope in the West able to do so.

== 1960s ==
- 1960, May — Lord Nuffield pays the remaining debt on the Mark I and the observatory is renamed the Nuffield Radio Astronomy Laboratories.
- 1962 — As part of a radio-linked interferometer, the Mark I identifies a new class of compact radio sources, later recognised as quasars.
- 1962 — Jodrell Bank radio telescope is mentioned in the science fiction novel A for Andromeda by Fred Hoyle and John Elliot.
- 1964 — The Mark II telescope is completed.
- 1966 — The Mark I receives pictures from Luna 9, the first spacecraft to make a soft landing on the Moon.
- 1966 — The Mark III telescope is completed.
- 1968 — The Mark I confirms the existence of pulsars.
- 1968 — The Mark I took part in the first transatlantic VLBI experiment in 1968, with other telescopes being those at Algonquin and Penticton in Canada.
- 1969 — The Mark I is used for the first time in a VLBI observation, with the Arecibo radio telescope in 1969.

== 1970s ==
- 1970–1971 — The Mark I is repaired and upgraded; it is renamed to the Mark IA.
- 1972–1973 — The Mark I carries out a survey of radio sources; amongst these sources was the first gravitational lens, which was confirmed optically in 1979.
- 1976, January — storms bring winds of around 90 mph which almost destroy the telescope. Bracing girders are added.

== 1980s ==
- 1980 — The Mark IA is used as part of the new MERLIN array.
- 1982 — The 42 ft telescope is built, to replace the 50 ft.
- 1986 — The first pulsar in a globular cluster is discovered.
- 1986 — The Mark II telescope is given a new surface that is accurate to 1/3 mm.
- 1987 — The Mark IA is renamed the Lovell Telescope after Bernard Lovell.

== 1990s ==
- 1990 — The new 32 m Cambridge telescope at Mullard Radio Astronomy Observatory is added to the MERLIN array.
- 1992 — The MERLIN array becomes a national facility.
- 1993 — At the request of NASA, the Lovell Telescope searches for the Mars Observer spacecraft.
- 1998 — The Lovell Telescope begins participation with the SETI Project Phoenix

== 2000s ==
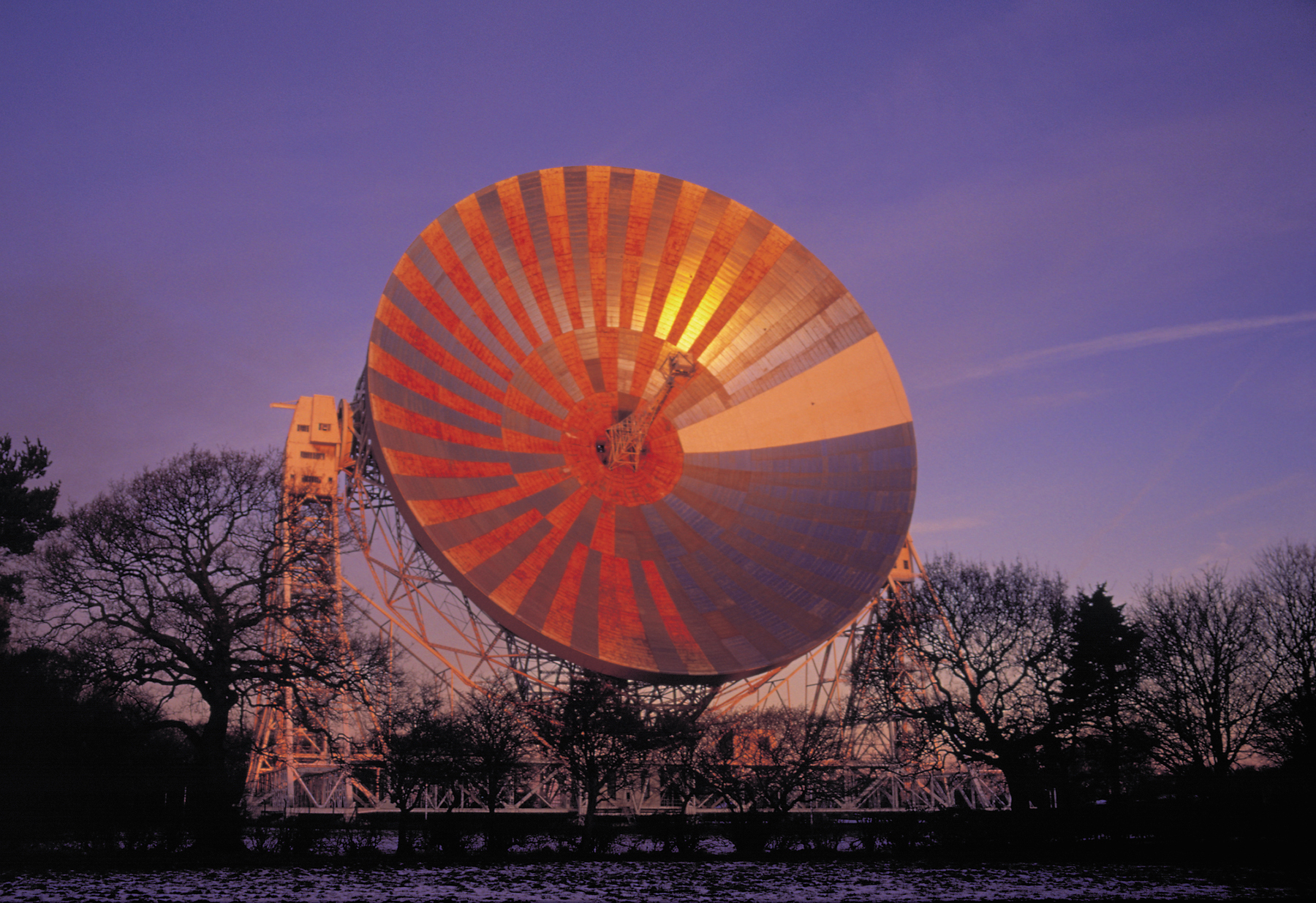
The Lovell telescope mid-resurfacing.

- 2000, February — The Lovell Telescope searches for NASA's Mars Polar Lander.
- 2000 — Placebo recorded the video for The Bitter End at Jodrell Bank.
- 2000–2002 — The Lovell Telescope is resurfaced, increasing its sensitivity at 5 GHz by a factor of five.
- 2003, December — The Lovell Telescope searches for the Beagle 2 lander on Mars.
- 2004, January — Astronomers from Jodrell Bank, Australia, Italy and the U.S. discover the first known double pulsar.
- 2004 — Minor scenes for the film of the Hitchhiker's Guide to the Galaxy are filmed at Jodrell Bank.
- 2005, February — Astronomers using the Lovell Telescope discovered a galaxy that appears to be made almost entirely of dark matter.
- 2005, March — Jodrell Bank becomes the centre of the World's largest scale model of the Solar System as part of the Spaced Out project.
- 2006, September — Jodrell Bank wins the BBC's online competition to find the UK's greatest "Unsung Landmark".

== 2010s ==
- 2011, March — Jodrell Bank is included on the UK Tentative List for nomination as a UNESCO World Heritage Site
- 2019, July — The observatory becomes a UNESCO World Heritage Site.
