= Gerard Bramwell Long =

British businessman

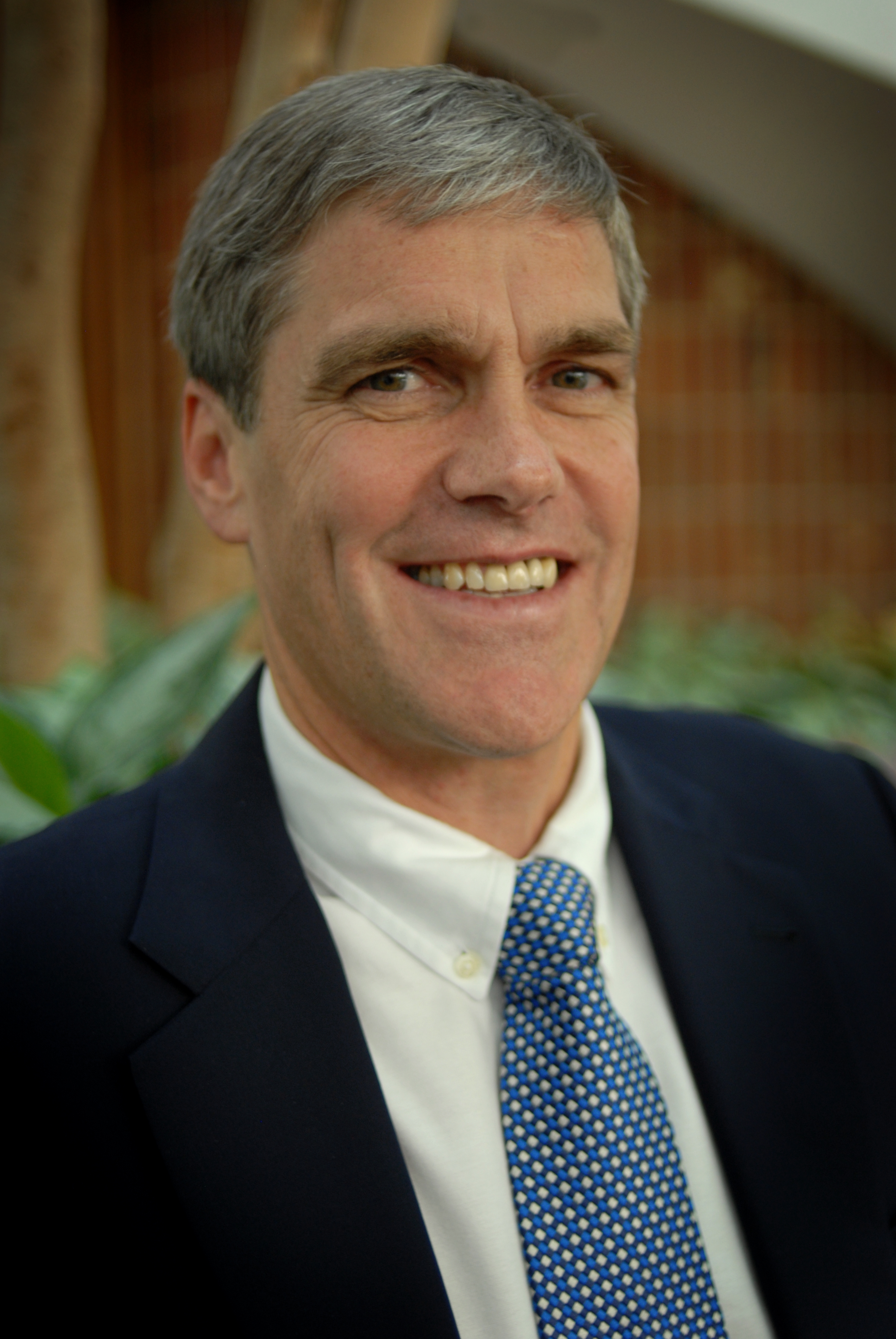
- Gerard Long
- Born: 10 December 1957 (age 68); London, England
- Occupations: Author, speaker, executive director, minister, writer, evangelist
- Website: http://blog.alphausa.org

Gerard Bramwell Long (born 10 December 1957) is a Christian minister, evangelist, author, motivational speaker, and former banking executive. He was executive director of Alpha course USA before he retired in 2014 to work for Awakening to God ministries.

== Early life ==
A top athlete in his youth, Long achieved notable success as a middle-distance runner and was captain of the team that had Olympic runner Sebastian Coe. He demonstrated an early aptitude for business, launching a successful commercial venture while still a college student. He became a Christian at age 22, on 14 February 1980.

== Career ==
Once he was embarked on a career, Long agreed to serve as a pastor at a North London church, where he remained for 22 years (during this time he was also Chairman of Christians in Finance, founded in 1875). Over the same period, Long achieved notable success in the world of business, becoming a senior executive at HSBC Plc, one of the world's largest banks and Europe's largest bank. His banking career took him around the world and included some significant roles, including Director of the Year 2000 Program (Millennium Bug) for the UK and Europe. In 2001 he was moved to New York to launch a global product, and then he was moved to Chicago to lead the integration of HSBC and Household International, following the latter's $13.8 billion purchase in 2003. He appeared on TV and in major newspapers both as an advisor on the Millennium Bug (Y2K) and as a Christian living for Jesus Christ in the City of London.

In 2006, Long decided to leave his banking career to join Alpha USA. Where he was the CEO for seven years, helping the industry grow over 300%. He resigned in 2014 due to his daughter drowning. The Washington Post describes Long as a "former banking executive" as one of the "stars of the church-saving circuit," and Alpha as a "church-saving business" that "sells course materials designed to boost church membership."

== The Breakthrough ==
In October 2010 Alpha USA released Long's first book, The Breakthrough. Developed in cooperation with business expert and author Ken Blanchard, The Breakthrough is a modern-day parable. Taking a page from "business-allegory" works, such as Blanchard's One-Minute Manager Long use a simple story to communicate basic concepts about God, religion, suffering, and the afterlife. He is now working on his second book, whose topic will focus on loss and grief, through his own personal experience, and how Christ-followers can understand and overcome it.

== Personal life ==
Long lives with his wife, Jeannie, in Malibu, California. He has lost two children to unexpected tragedies. Long's daughter, Rebecca, also worked for Alpha USA as the National Director of Youth; she drowned at age 32 in Lake Michigan in May 2014. His youngest son, Alex, took his own life at age 17 in 2005. Long's surviving son, Ben, works in the City of London.
