= Raisa Struchkova =

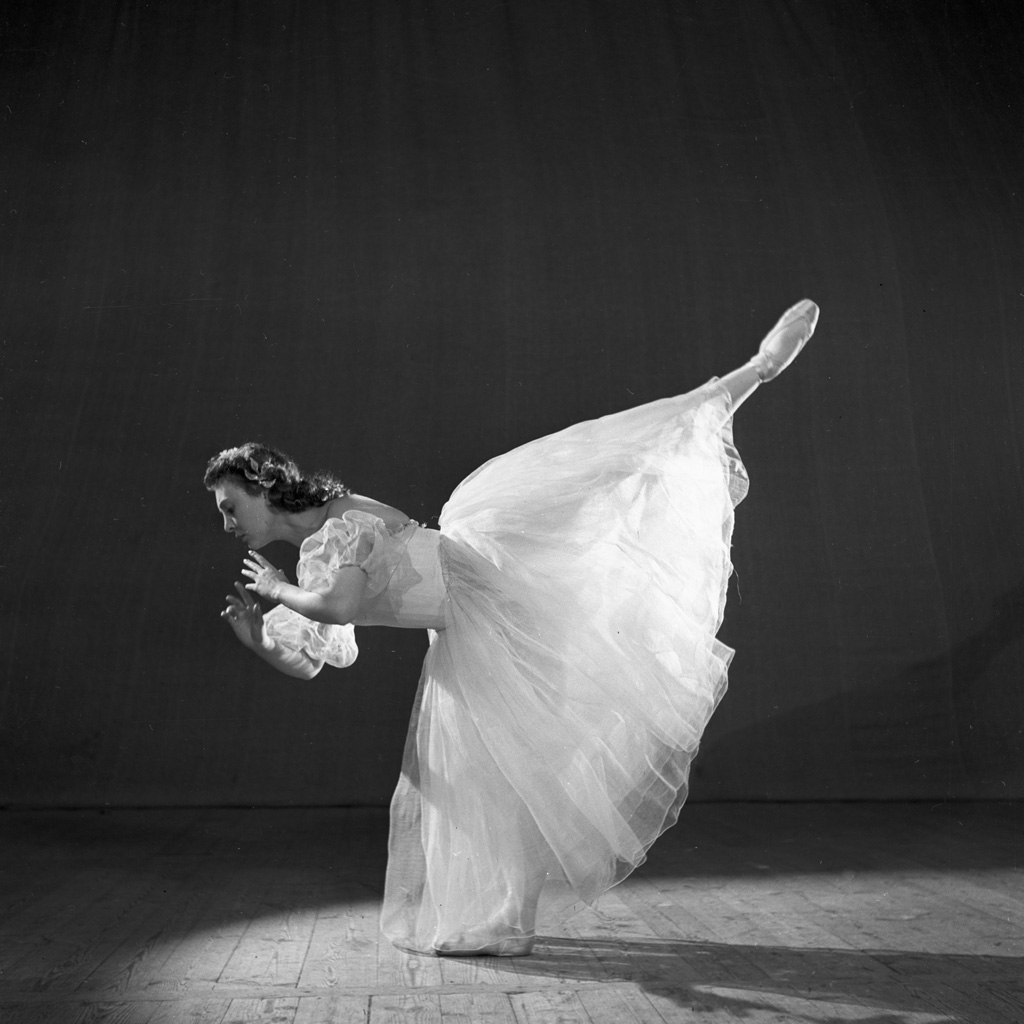
- Raisa Struchkova in a scene from ballet Sleeping Beauty
- Born: Раиса Степановна Стручкова; 5 October 1925; Moscow, USSR
- Died: 2 May 2005 (aged 79); Moscow, Russia
- Occupation: Ballerina
- Employer: Bolshoi Theatre
- Awards: People's Artist of the USSR

Raisa Stepanovna Struchkova (Russian: Раиса Степановна Стручкова) (5 October 1925 – 2 May 2005) was a Russian dancer and People's Artist of the USSR.

== Biography ==
Struchkova was born on 5 October 1925 in Moscow to a factory worker. She studied at the Moscow Ballet School, her teacher was Elizaveta Gerdt. In 1944, she graduated from Bolshoi Ballet school and became its member the same year. Two years later she appeared in the ballet La fille mal gardée where she danced the principal role of Lise which became her first major role. Even though that previous ballet dancers, as of 1945, did Cinderella, she perfected it in 1947 by being Cinderella herself. Unlike other famous female ballet dancers of that time like Galina Ulanova and Maya Plisetskaya she didn't become an international star, but the Cinderella role made her famous nationwide. In 1949 she starred as Dawn in Coppélia and the same year played a role of Parasha in The Bronze Horseman. Throughout her career she danced as a leading role in such ballets as Giselle, Don Quixote, Swan Lake, the Sleeping Beauty, the Nutcracker, and many, many others. Later on, she became a ballet teacher in 1962 at the State Theatrical Institute of the Arts and in 1978 became ballet coach at Bolshoi. She was a founder of the magazine Soviet Ballet, which became Ballet after 1992, and worked there as an editor from 1981 to 1995.

She died in Moscow on 2 May 2005 at the age of 79.
