= John Slater (actor) =

British actor (1916–1975)

- 1955 Barbers Teas Cinema and Television Stars trading card
- Born: Basil John Slater; 22 August 1916; London, England
- Died: 9 January 1975 (aged 58); London, England
- Occupation: Actor
- Years active: 1941–1974
- Spouse: Betty Levy
- Children: 2

John Slater (22 August 1916 – 9 January 1975) was an English character actor who usually portrayed lugubrious, amiable cockney types.

== Biography ==
Slater's father was an antiques dealer. After attending St Clement Danes Grammar School in Hammersmith, Slater began acting in farce at the Whitehall Theatre. He first appeared on film in 1938, remaining active in the industry up to his death. He was a familiar face in British films of the 1940s and appeared in many classic films of the period, including The Day Will Dawn (1942, US title The Avengers), Went the Day Well? (1942), We Dive at Dawn (1943), A Canterbury Tale (1944), The Seventh Veil (1945), It Always Rains on Sunday (1947) and Passport to Pimlico (1949).

He was also a singer, and made three solo 78 rpm records for Columbia in 1953 and 1954. The first of these was a cover of "(How Much is) That Doggie in the Window?", followed by "Travelling Alone", his own composition. The latter was released in 1953, and subsequently used in the 1956 film Johnny, You're Wanted, which starred Slater in the lead role. In 1954, Columbia released a single of excerpts from Dry Rot, a farce from London's Whitehall Theatre by John Chapman (which later became a film of the same name). The record featured Slater alongside Brian Rix, Basil Lord, Cicely Paget-Bowman, Diana Caderwood and Chapman, with Jackie Brown on the Hammond organ. In 1959, Slater participated on a studio cast recording of My Fair Lady, singing "With a Little Bit of Luck" and "Get Me to the Church on Time" as Eliza Doolittle's father Alfred.

Slater narrated the National Coal Board's Mining Review documentary series, and was known on television for his presenter role opposite popular children's puppets Pinky and Perky during the 1960s, as a story-teller on Jackanory and as Det. Sgt. Stone in Z-Cars from 1967 to 1974 where his episode count was beaten only by that of James Ellis. He also appeared in the notorious 1958 stage production of Harold Pinter's The Birthday Party, as Nat Goldberg. He narrated the 1963 film Giants of Steam made by the British Broadcasting Corporation and British Transport Films.

Slater sustained life-threatening injuries as a result of an air crash in France in 1946 and sporadic bouts of ill health hampered his career. He died on 9 January 1975 from a heart attack, aged 58.

== Selected filmography ==
- Alf's Button Afloat (1938) - Minor Role (uncredited)
- This Man Is Dangerous (1941) - (uncredited)
- Love on the Dole (1941) - Agitator on Demonstration (uncredited)
- "Pimpernel" Smith (1941) - Reporter (uncredited)
- Facing the Music (1941)
- The Saint Meets the Tiger (1941) - Eddie
- The Common Touch (1941) - Joe
- Penn of Pennsylvania (1942) - Newgate Prisoner with Mouse (uncredited)
- Hatter's Castle (1942) - Card Player (uncredited)
- Gert and Daisy's Weekend (1942) - Jack Densham
- The Day Will Dawn (1942, US title The Avengers) - American Reporter In Oslo Hotel (uncredited)
- Flying Fortress (1942) - Air Raid Warden (uncredited)
- They Flew Alone (1942) - Officer on Interview Panel
- Unpublished Story (1942) - Code Soldier (uncredited)
- Uncensored (1942) - Théophile
- The Young Mr. Pitt (1942) - Minor Role (uncredited)
- Went the Day Well? (1942) - Sergeant
- Those Kids from Town (1942) - Minor Role (uncredited)
- The Harvest Shall Come (1942, Short) - Tom Grimwood (uncredited)
- We Dive at Dawn (1943) - Charlie (uncredited)
- Undercover (1943) - Minor Role (uncredited)
- Millions Like Us (1943) - Alec - Man at Dance Hall (uncredited)
- The Adventures of Tartu (1943) - Luftwaffe Man with Coffee (uncredited)
- Schweik's New Adventures (1943) - A4
- Deadlock (1943) - Fred Bamber / Allan Bamber
- The New Lot (1943) - Soldier in Truck (uncredited)
- Candlelight in Algeria (1944) - American Officer
- For Those in Peril (1944) - A / C 1. Wilkie
- The Hundred Pound Window (1944) - O'Neil
- A Canterbury Tale (1944) - Sergt. Len
- I Live in Grosvenor Square (1945) - Paratrooper
- Murder in Reverse (1945) - Fred Smith
- The Seventh Veil (1945) - James
- Teheran (1946) - Maj. Sergei Soviesky, USSR
- It Always Rains on Sunday (1947) - Lou Hyams
- Escape (1948) - Salesman
- Against the Wind (1948) - Emile Meyer
- Noose (1948) - Pudd'n Bason
- Passport to Pimlico (1949) - Frank Huggins
- Prelude to Fame (1950) - Dr. Lorenzo
- The Third Visitor (1951) - James Oliver
- The Faithful City (1952) - Ezra
- The Ringer (1952) - Bell
- The Promise (1952)
- The Long Memory (1953) - Pewsey
- The Flanagan Boy (1953) - Charlie Sullivan
- Strange Stories (1953) - Storyteller / Narrator
- The Million Pound Note (1954) - Parsons
- Star of India (1954) - Emile
- John Wesley (1954) - Condemned Man
- Johnny, You're Wanted (1956) - Johnny
- Raiders of the River (1956) - Narrator
- The Devil's Pass (1957) - Bill Buckle
- Violent Playground (1958) - Sgt. Walker
- Upgreen - And at 'Em (1960)
- The Night We Got the Bird (1961) - Wolf Mannheim (Manny)
- Three on a Spree (1961) - Sid Johnson
- Nothing Barred (1961) - Warder Lockitt
- A Place to Go (1963) - Jack Ellerman
- The Yellow Hat (1966) - Slack
