= The Man Who Finally Died (TV series) =

1959 British TV drama

The Man Who Finally Died is a 1959 television drama. The seven-part serial aired on ITV, and was produced by ATV. Each episode was 30 minutes long. It was later remade as the 1963 film of the same name. Cast included Richard Pasco and Delphi Lawrence. The series still exists in its entirety

== Plot ==
A man receives a message from his father...a man believed to have died during the Second World War

== Cast ==
- Richard Pasco as Joe Newman
- Delphi Lawrence as Lisa Deutsch
- Edward Judd as Rahn
- Eric Pohlmann as Inspector Hoffmeister
- Ruth Lodge as Marta Gellman
- John Van Eyssen as Sergeant Hirsch
- Ralph Michael as Dr. Von Brecht
- Dorothy White as Maria
- Harold Goldblatt as Brenner
- Nigel Green as Carl Heinrich
- Hilary Bamberger as Mina
- Anne Carroll as Sylvia
- Frank Sieman as Hotel manager
