= Reluctant hero (disambiguation) =

A reluctant hero is a heroic archetype typically found in fiction.

Reluctant hero may also refer to:

- Reluctant Hero, a 2020 album by Killer Be Killed
- Reluctant Heroes, a 1952 British comedy film
- Reluctant Heroes (play), a 1950 play from which the 1952 film was adapted
- The Reluctant Hero, a 1941 Spanish comedy film
- "The Reluctant Hero" (Dawson's Creek), a television episode
- The Reluctant Heroes, a 1971 television war film
