= Group 3 Films =

British film production company

Logo from opening of Laxdale Hall (1953)

Group 3 Films was a short lived British film production company that operated from 1951 to 1955.

== Background ==
It was set up by the National Film Finance Corporation (NFFC) to help finance movies from newer filmmakers. Its films were to be distributed by the Associated British Film DIstributors (ABFD) subsidiary of Associated British Picture Corporation and mostly financed by the NFFC with ABFD to make up the balance of finance. Michael Balcon and James Lawrie sat on the board and the company was run by John Grierson and John Baxter.

They produced over 20 films and lost half a million pounds before the NFFC brought the company to a halt.

== Critical appraisal ==
FilmInk wrote "are there any decent Group 3 pictures?"

== Select Films ==
- Judgment Deferred (1951) - directed by John Baxter starring Joan Collins
- Brandy for the Parson (1952) - directed by John Eldridge starring Kenneth More
- Time Gentlemen Please! (1952) - directed by Lewis Gilbert
- You're Only Young Twice (1952) - directed by Terry Bishop
- The Brave Don't Cry (1952) - directed by Philip Leacock starring John Gregson
- Miss Robin Hood (1952) - directed by John Guillermin starring Margaret Rutherford
- Laxdale Hall (1952) - directed by John Eldridge
- Child's Play (1952) - directed by Margaret Thomson, written by Don Sharp
- The Nutcracker (1952) (short) - directed by Cyril Frankel
- The Oracle (1953) - directed by C. M. Pennington-Richards
- Man of Africa (1953) - directed by Cyril Frankel
- Background (1953) a.k.a. Edge of Divorce - written by Don Sharp, directed by Daniel Lowe
- The Conquest of Everest (1953) (documentary) directed by George Lowe
- The Angel Who Pawned Her Harp (1953) - directed by Alan Bromly starring Diane Cilento
- Devil on Horseback (1954) - directed by Cyril Frankel
- Conflict of Wings (1954) a.k.a. Fuss Over Feathers - directed by John Elddridge, written by Don Sharp, starring Kieron Moore and Edwin Richfield
- The End of the Road (1954) - directed by Wolf Rilla
- Orders are Orders (1954) - directed by David Paltenghi
- Make Me an Offer (1954) - directed by Cyril Frankel from debut novel of Wolf Mankowitz starring Peter Finch in his first solo lead
- Doublecross (1954) a.k.a. Queer Fish
- The Love Match (1954) - directed by David Paltenghi starring Arthur Askey
- The Blue Peter (1955) - directed by Wolf Rilla, written by Don Sharp, starring Kieron Moore and Edwin Richfield
- John and Julie (1955) - directed by William Fairchild
- Tensing's Country (1955) (documentary)
- The Challenge of the North (1955) (documentary)

== Notes ==
- MacCann, Richard Dyer (July 1977). "Subsidy for the Screen Grierson and Group 3". Sight and Sound. pp. 168–173.
