= Chlidonophora incerta =

Scientific classification
- Kingdom: Animalia
- Phylum: Brachiopoda
- Class: Rhynchonellata
- Order: Terebratulida
- Family: Chlidonophoridae
- Genus: Chlidonophora
- Species: C. incerta

Binomial name
- Chlidonophora incerta (Davidson, 1878)

Synonyms
- Megerlia incerta Davidson, 1878; Terebratulina incerta (Davidson, 1878)

Species of brachiopod from the Atlantic Ocean

Chlidonophora incerta is a species of brachiopod in the family Chlidonophoridae.

== Disputes ==
Chlidonophora incerta was discovered by Davidson in 1878 and he classified it in the genus Megerlia. Other taxonomists categorized it under the genus Terebratulina. Later it was reclassified into the genus Chlidonophora which is currently accepted.

== Existence ==
Chlidonophora incerta is extant to the present day but its complete fossil range is unknown. There have been a total of 125 occurrences of the species, mainly in the Gulf of Mexico, Caribbean sea and the North Atlantic ocean off the east coast of Europe. There are 2 synonymous names, Megerlia incerta and Terebratulina incerta both of which are unaccepted.

== Description ==
=== Characteristics ===
Chlidonophora incerta lives in the deep waters of the Atlantic ocean in the Benthic zone. It is blind like all other species of Rhynchonellata. It is stationary and attached to a surface like all other brachiopods. It is a filter feeder and its diet consists of suspended food particles in the water like phytoplankton. It has a taphonomy of low mg calcite like all other brachiopods. It is also gonochoric, i.e. there are 2 genders, male and female and an organism is only one gender throughout its lifetime like in humans.

=== Life cycle ===
Firstly, the mother sheds the eggs into the water. The eggs are fertilized during the time of spawning. They hatch into free-swimming larvae that metamorphose into adults which are stationary and cannot move freely.
