= Chlidonophora chuni =

Scientific classification
- Kingdom: Animalia
- Phylum: Brachiopoda
- Class: Rhynchonellata
- Order: Terebratulida
- Family: Chlidonophoridae
- Genus: Chlidonophora
- Species: C. chuni

Binomial name
- Chlidonophora chuni Blochmann, 1903

Species of brachiopod

Chlidonophora chuni (Blochmann, 1903) is an extant species of brachiopods in the family Chlidonophoridae.

== Existence ==
Chlidonophora chuni is extant to the present day but its complete fossil range is unknown as all occurrences of the species were of living organisms. There have been 19 occurrences of this species, most in the Indian ocean around Madagascar.

== Characteristics ==
Chlidonophora chuni lives in the subtropical waters off the eastern coast of Africa in the Benthic zone. It is blind like all other species of Rhynchonellata. It is stationary and attached to a surface like all other brachiopods. It is a filter feeder (also known as suspension feeder) and its diet consists of suspended food particles like phytoplankton. It also has a taphonomy of low mg calcite like all other brachiopods. It is gonochoric, i.e. there are 2 genders, male and female like humans.

== Life cycle ==
Eggs are shed into the water and are fertilized during the time of spawning. They hatch into free swimming larvae which later metamorphose into adults that are stationary.
