= Desert Rats (play) =

1945 play

- Written by: Colin Morris
- Original language: English
- Genre: War drama

Premiere
- Date premiered: 19 February 1945
- Place premiered: Theatre Royal, Brighton

Desert Rats is a 1945 play by the British writer Colin Morris. It revolves around a patrol of the British Eighth Army operating in the desert outside Tripoli during the North African Campaign.

It premiered at the Theatre Royal, Brighton before transferring to the Adelphi Theatre in London's West End where it ran for 44 performances between 26 April to 2 June 1945. The original West End cast included Richard Greene, Bill Owen, Kieron Moore, Ian Colin, Larry Noble, Manning Whiley and Michael Whittaker.

== Bibliography ==
- Wearing, J.P. The London Stage 1940-1949: A Calendar of Productions, Performers, and Personnel. Rowman & Littlefield, 2014.
