= Laxdale Hall (novel) =

1951 novel

- First edition
- Author: Eric Linklater
- Language: English
- Genre: Comedy
- Publisher: Jonathan Cape
- Publication date: 1951
- Publication place: United Kingdom
- Media type: Print

Laxdale Hall is a 1951 comedy novel by the British writer Eric Linklater. A community in the West Highlands refuses to pay its taxes unless it receives a new road.

== Adaptation ==
It was adapted into the 1953 film of the same title directed by John Eldridge and starring Ronald Squire, Kathleen Ryan and Raymond Huntley.

== Bibliography ==
- Goble, Alan. The Complete Index to Literary Sources in Film. Walter de Gruyter, 1999.
- Hart, Francis Russell. The Scottish Novel: From Smollett to Spark. Harvard University Press, 1978.
