= Bikini Paradise =

1967 film

- Directed by: Gregg G. Tallas
- Written by: Daniel Aubrey; Howard Bert
- Produced by: Bernard Glasser; Lester A. Sansom
- Starring: Janette Scott; Kieron Moore; John Baer; Kay Walsh
- Cinematography: Manuel Berenguer
- Edited by: Kurt Herrnfeld
- Music by: Johnny Douglas
- Production companies: A.C.E. Films; Security Pictures
- Distributed by: Allied Artists Pictures
- Release date: May 3, 1967
- Running time: 89 minutes
- Country: United States
- Language: English

Bikini Paradise is an American comedy film produced in 1964, directed by Gregg G. Tallas and starring Janette Scott, Kieron Moore and John Baer.

The film's sets were designed by the art director Eugène Lourié. Location shooting took place in the Canary Islands. The film was produced under the name White Savage at the same time as Crack in the World sharing cast and crew members.

== Plot ==
Shortly after World War II two naval officers are sent to find Harriet Pembroke, a schoolteacher who fled from the Japanese forces. Eventually they discover her on a small Pacific island with an all-female population of which she has become the leader.

== Cast ==
- Janette Scott as Rachel
- Kieron Moore as Lieut. Allison Fraser
- John Baer as Lieut. Anthony Crane
- Kay Walsh as Harriet Pembroke
- Alexander Knox as Commissioner Lighton
- Anna Brazzou as Maya
- Sylvia Sorente as Daphne
- Margaret Nolan as Margarita
- Robert Beatty as Commissioner
- Michele Mahaut as Lisa
- Francine Welch as Charlotte
- Pilar Clemens as Julia
- Aida Power as Ingrid

== Release ==
Bikini Paradise was released in the United States on 3 May 1967. In the United Kingdom, it was listed in Monthly Film Bulletin in January 1970, noted in the Sunday Mail on 19 July 1970, and showing at the New Palace, Earl Shilton, on 13-14 December 1971.

== Bibliography ==
- Jean-Louis Ginibre, John Lithgow & Barbara Cady. Ladies Or Gentlemen: A Pictorial History of Male Cross-dressing in the Movies. Filipacchi Publishing, 2005.
