= Reluctant Heroes (play) =

1950 play

- Written by: Colin Morris
- Original language: English
- Genre: Comedy

Premiere
- Date premiered: 27 March 1950
- Place premiered: White Rock Theatre, Hastings

Reluctant Heroes is a comedy play by the British writer Colin Morris. It premiered at the White Rock Theatre in Hastings before transferring to the Whitehall Theatre in London's West End where it ran for 1,610 performances between 12 September 1950 and 24 July 1954. The original West End cast included Brian Rix, Larry Noble, Dermot Walsh, Wally Patch, Bruce Belfrage and Elspet Gray. Other actors who appeared during the run included John Slater, Peter Hammond, Darcy Conyers, Bernard Fox and Gene Anderson. It was the first of the Whitehall farces, and concerns a group of National Service recruits.

== Film adaptation ==
In 1952 it was adapted into a film of the same title directed by Jack Raymond and starring Ronald Shiner, Derek Farr and Christine Norden. Rix, Noble, Gray and several other members of the stage cast reprised their roles for the film.

== Bibliography ==
- Goble, Alan. The Complete Index to Literary Sources in Film. Walter de Gruyter, 1999.
- Wearing, J.P. The London Stage 1950-1959: A Calendar of Productions, Performers, and Personnel. Rowman & Littlefield, 2014.
