= Conflict of Wings =

1954 British film by John Eldridge

- Original lobby card
- Directed by: John Eldridge
- Written by: John Pudney; Don Sharp
- Based on: Conflict of Wings by Don Sharp
- Produced by: Herbert Mason
- Starring: John Gregson; Muriel Pavlow; Kieron Moore; Niall MacGinnis
- Cinematography: Arthur Grant; Moray Grant
- Edited by: Lito Carruthers
- Music by: Philip Green
- Production company: Group 3 Films
- Distributed by: British Lion Films
- Release dates: 30 March 1954 (London); 26 December 1954 (United States)
- Running time: 84 minutes
- Country: United Kingdom
- Language: English

Conflict of Wings (also known as Norfolk Story; U.S. title: Fuss Over Feathers) is a 1954 British comedy drama film directed by John Eldridge and starring John Gregson, Muriel Pavlow and Kieron Moore. It was written by John Pudney and Don Sharp based on the 1954 novel of the same title by Sharp. Villagers in Norfolk rally to prevent the RAF from attempting to use an island for target practice.

It was a production of Group 3 Films with backing from the NFFC. Shooting took place at Beaconsfield Studios and on location in Norfolk. The film's sets were designed by the art director Ray Simm. It is one of the rare British aviation films that focused on the ground crew as opposed to aircrew. It was distributed by British Lion.

== Plot ==
A small Norfolk village is outraged when it is discovered that the Ministry of Land Acquisition proposes to take over the nearby Island of Children, a bird sanctuary, for the RAF to use as a ground attack firing range. A struggle of wills begins between the authorities and the villagers, who resort to a variety of ways to prevent damage to the historic island. Harry Tilney is all for taking on the government, but his compatriot, Sally has a boyfriend stationed at the nearby Royal Air Force base, Corporal Bill Morris, so she goes to see him first.

Meanwhile, Squadron Leader Parsons is informed that his unit's mission is being changed to ground attack. The de Havilland Vampire jets have to be modified to mount rockets. Parsons is informed he will have three weeks for the conversion, then four weeks to get his men trained. His commanding officer is not at liberty to inform him that the unit will then be sent overseas, but he takes the hint.

The land acquisition is assigned to a bureaucrat, Mr. Wentworth, which is rather awkward for him, as he is a prominent member of a bird watching society. He comes to discuss the situation with Harry, but Harry is drunk and drives him away. The villagers then learn that fishing rights to the area were granted to the people by Henry VIII. "Soapy", the professional eel catcher, can squat on the land and use those rights to block the acquisition. However, Soapy receives a letter from the government stating that there is no evidence that such rights exist.

"Bookie" then discovers that the land was given to the Church by Henry VIII for assistance in quelling a rebellion. The villagers present this information to Parsons. He agrees to pass it along to the Government, but in the meantime he insists on continuing with the training.

In desperation, the local people take to their boats and sail to the island, to occupy the target area and prevent the first attack run. However, the field telephone wire is broken as they come ashore, meaning the RAF controller on the range cannot get a message through to have the flight cancelled. Low cloud cover conceals the site from the approaching aircraft, which commence their attack run, but fortunately the protestors are spotted by the leading aircraft and the attack is aborted just in time to avoid a disaster.

The near miss means that there will have to be an official inquiry, which will take months or a year, by which time the unit will have been sent to Malaya.

== Cast ==
- John Gregson as Cpl. Bill Morris
- Muriel Pavlow as Sally
- Kieron Moore as Sqn. Ldr. Parsons
- Niall MacGinnis as Harry Tilney
- Harry Fowler as L.A.C. "Buster"
- Guy Middleton as the Adjutant
- Sheila Sweet as Fanny Bates
- Campbell Singer as Flt. Sgt. Campbell
- Frederick Piper as Joe Bates
- Russell Napier as Wg. Cdr. Rogers
- Bartlett Mullins as "Soapy"
- Edwin Richfield as "Smother" Brooks
- Margaret Withers as Mrs. Tilney
- Howard Connell as F/O Flying Control
- Beryl Cooke as Miss Nelson
- Tony Doonan as Range Cpl.
- John Gale as Range L.A.C.
- Brian Harding as 1st pilot
- Barbara Hicks as Mrs. Thompson
- Humphrey Lestocq as Sqn. Ldr. Davidson
- Charles Lloyd-Pack as "Bookie"
- William Mervyn as Mr. Wentworth / Col. Wentworth
- Brian Moorehead as 3rd pilot
- Hugh Moxey as Mr. Ruddle
- Dorothea Rundle as Mrs. Trotter
- Harold Siddons as Flt. Lt. Edwards
- David Spenser as Cpl. Flying Control
- Peter Swanwick Sgt. working party
- Guy Verney as 2nd pilot
- Gwenda Wilson as Miss Flew
- George Woodbridge as 'old circular' (man in charge of pumping-station)

== Original novel ==
Conflict of Wings was based on a story by Don Sharp who had written a number of films for Group Three Productions. He was inspired by walking around Norfolk and thinking of the conflict between airlines and the local area; he read a line in a guide book claiming Romans had buried their dead children in the local area which resulted in a story. He pitched the idea for the film to Group Three, and wrote it up as a novel and as a screenplay. Sharp wrote the screenplay in collaboration with John Pudney.

A reviewer from the Sydney Morning Herald described the novel as follows:

This reviewer's guess is that the story began as a film scenario, which could explain the precise, illustrative, uninspired style of the novel. Tasmanian-born Don Sharp has been in turn actor, broadcaster and film producer; and a background of that kind rarely favours the novel form. One sees its influence in sentences such as: "The villagers greeted Sally conventionally"-a playwright's note of guidance to a producer, rather than a novelist's picture of a scene ... Behind the quietly amusing account of this controversy [the storyline] is the larger question whether English tradition must bow before the needs of national security, and Don Sharp debates it with intelligent sympathy. But the novel suffers because his characters are wooden and shaped to convenient patterns. It is as if they require to be brought to life by good actors in one of those rural settings which English film producers contrive so well.

The Brisbane Telegraph thought the novel "deserves to be welcomed with banners and trumpets. "Conflict of Wings" is innocent of fancy technique, and its simple prose seems to capture the cool, wind swept quality of the Norfolk marshes beloved by the author."

== Production ==
Conflict of Wings was originally called The Norfolk Story, and under this working title, the film was shot at Beaconsfield Film Studios, on location in Norfolk and in East Yorkshire at the Central Gunnery School, RAF Leconfield. (Note: Conflict of Wings sets were designed by art director Ray Simm.)

The aircraft in the film included:

- Gloster Meteor T.7
- Gloster Meteor F.8
- de Havilland Vampire FB5 c/w VV624, VZ150, WA229, WA231, WA285
- de Havilland Vampire T.11 s/n WZ424
- Supermarine Swift F1
- Avro Lincoln

== Release ==
Conflict of Wings was released to cinemas in London on 30 March 1954 and released later that year in the United States as Fuss Over Feathers.

== Reception ==
The Monthly Film Bulletin wrote: "Conflict of Wings returns, somewhat more seriously than most of its predecessors, to a favourite theme of recent British films: the struggle of a small community to preserve what it considers to be its traditional rights against the forces of progress and bureaucracy. The embattled villagers of this picture have much in common with those in The Titfield Thunderbolt, Laxdale Hall and other films of the genre; they are, in fact, creations of the script-writer's imagination – an over-smart barmaid, a whimsical old fisherman, a girl given to reflecting on the meaning of life – and the script lacks the grasp and conviction, the direction the feeling for place (the Island of Children scarcely lives up to the claims made for it), necessary to persuade one that these villagers are passionately concerned in their battle for the bird sanctuary. In the end, the film takes neither side, admitting the justice of the Air Force's case and concluding that we must endeavour to have the best of both worlds. Conflict of Wings has the customary assets of its type: attractive exterior photography (in Eastman Color), and some reliable playing, notably in the smaller parts. The conception of the film, though, is essentially an artificial one."

Virginia Graham of The Spectator wrote: "People who appreciate the calm, embellished with a little bird song, deserve our sympathy, of course, but the times are changing and it is only in the shelter of aluminium wings that England can build its nest??. Good example of Anglo-Saxon pragmatism!"

Halliwell's Film & Video Guide described it as a "[sub]-Ealing comedy-drama with a highly predictable outcome; generally pleasant but without much bite."

In The Radio Times Guide to Films David Parkinson gave the film 3/5 stars, writing: "The borrowings come thick and fast in this sentimental rural drama about the residents of a Norfolk village trying to stop the RAF turning a local bird sanctuary into a firing range. But, while it never lives up to the great Ealing comedies, this is still a pleasing little picture, with the Norfolk Broads looking lovely in Arthur Grant and Martin Curtis's washed-out colour photography. The folklore behind the tale is charming, there are a couple of tear jerking moments and a rousing rally-round finale."

In British Sound Films: The Studio Years 1928–1959 David Quinlan rated the film as "good", writing: "A sort of serious Ealing film, well thought out and argued. Credit marks in all department."

Aviation film historian Michael Paris in From the Wright Brothers to Top Gun: Aviation, Nationalism, and Popular Cinema described Conflict of Wings as reflecting the "international tensions of the 1950s". Paris goes on to describe how the threat to a natural sanctuary would "raise some interesting issues ..." especially when national defence was involved.
