= Terebratulina gracilis =

Scientific classification
- Kingdom: Animalia
- Phylum: Brachiopoda
- Class: Rhynchonellata
- Order: Terebratulida
- Family: Cancellothyrididae
- Genus: Terebratulina
- Species: T. gracilis

Binomial name
- Terebratulina gracilis (Schlotheim, 1813)

Extinct species of marine lamp shell

Terebratulina gracilis, also called Spirifer gracilis, is an extinct species of brachiopods. The fossils are present in the lower Cretaceous.
