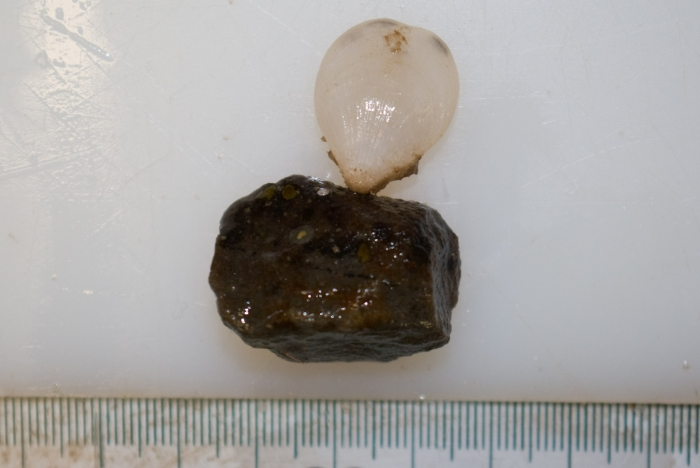
- Terebratulina septentrionalis using pedicle to attach to hard substrate

Scientific classification
- Kingdom: Animalia
- Phylum: Brachiopoda
- Class: Rhynchonellata
- Order: Terebratulida
- Family: Cancellothyrididae
- Genus: Terebratulina
- Species: T. septentrionalis

Binomial name
- Terebratulina septentrionalis Couthouy, 1838

= Terebratulina septentrionalis =

Species of brachiopod

Terebratulina septentrionalis is a species of brachiopod that comes from the family Terebratulidae. It is an invertebrate that can be found in parts of the oceans with strong currents, more specifically the Northern Atlantic ocean and Arctic ocean. This brachiopod has a bivalve shell with a lophophore feeding structure and a pedicle to attach itself to hard substrates.

== Description ==
Terebratulina septentrionalis has a smooth, biconvex shell that ranges from a yellowish to a light brown colour. The shell is composed of calcium carbonate and there is a short pedicle which acts as an anchor to hard substrates. A pedicle is a fleshy stalk that is able to anchor the organism to a hard substrate and allows for a short, flat shell to elongate and convex. As mentioned before, this brachiopod has a lophophore which is a ciliated feeding organ used to filter plankton and other tiny organisms drifting in the current.

=== Early life ===
Early life for T. septentrionalis starts with a flat, short shell which lacks ridges, as seen in the photo of the T. septentrionalis that is attached to the hard substrate. As it ages and develops further, the lophophore will develop around the opening of the mouth and eventually will grow enough to develop into the brachiopod's arms.

=== Habitat ===
This species is mainly found in the Northern Atlantic Ocean and in Arctic waters. It is found at depths ranging from 50 m (160 ft) to over 1,000 m (3,300 ft) deep. They can be found attached to rocky substrates, coral, or other hard surfaces for the pedicle to attach.

=== Behavior ===
Terebratulina septentrionalis is a suspension feeder and uses its lophophore to create water currents to draw in water to filter out plankton and organic particles. This species are sessile and participate in benthic ecosystems, located near sponges, bryozoans, and cold water coral.

=== Reproduction ===
Similarly to other brachiopods, this species reproduces sexually through release of sperm or eggs into the water currents which will eventually meet together to form a zygote and settle into the seabed as a larva until fully developed.

=== Conservation ===
This species is not considered endangered or threatened. However, since this species can be deep sea dwelling, it is susceptible to habitat disturbances such from deep sea trawling, climate change, and acidification of the ocean. Barnes, D. K. A., and Peck, L. S. examine populations of a similar deep sea brachiopod called Neorhynchia strebeli found on the Antarctic shelf and the ecological significance in this region of the ocean.
