= Kieron Moore (Irish actor) =

Irish actor, writer and activist (1924–2007)

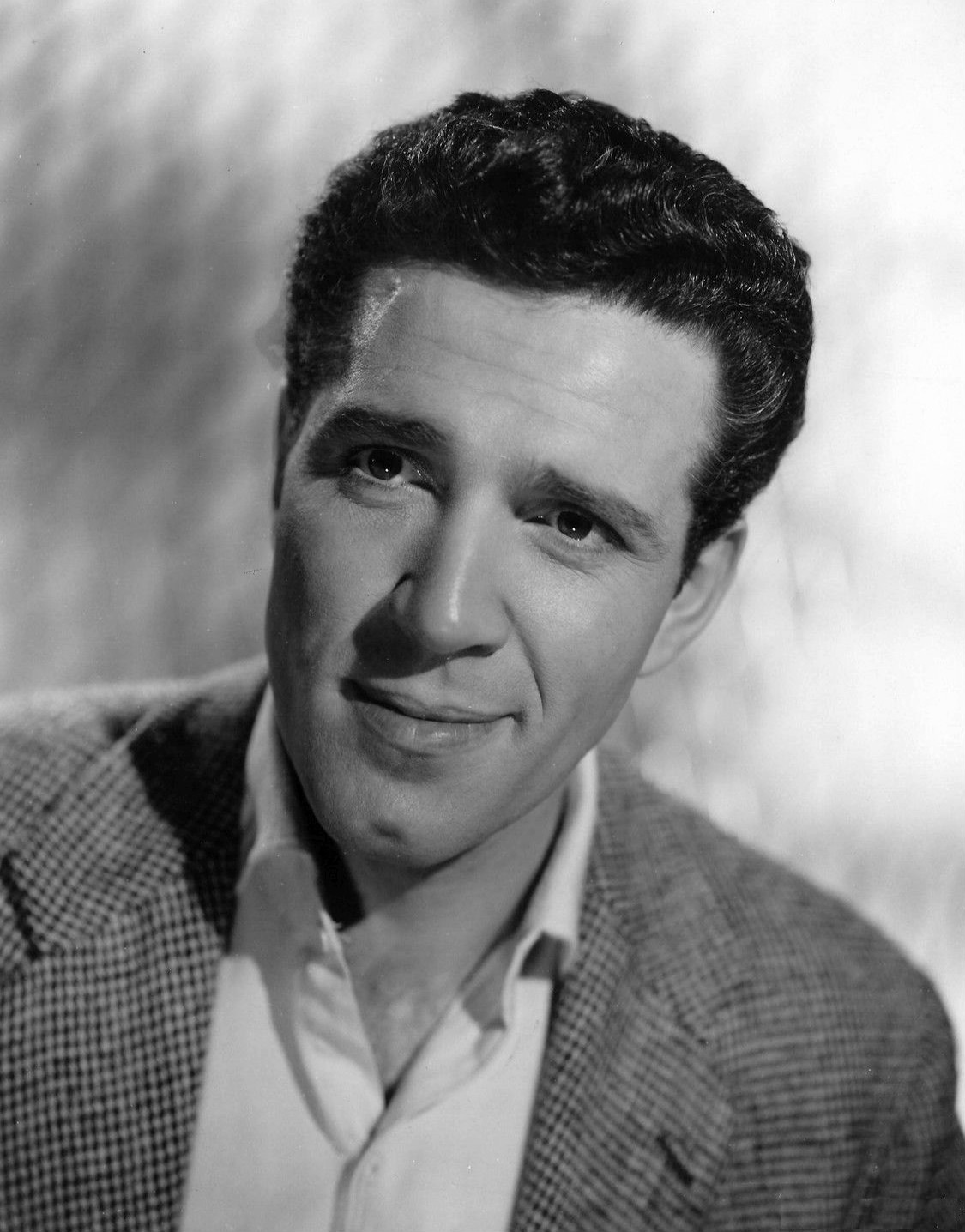
- Kieron Moore in 1956
- Born: Ciarán Ó hAnnracháin; 5 October 1924; Skibbereen, County Cork, Ireland
- Died: 15 July 2007 (aged 82); Charente-Maritime, France
- Education: University College Dublin
- Occupations: Actor, journalist, activist
- Years active: 1946–1974 (actor)
- Spouse: Barbara White (m. 1947)
- Children: 4

Kieron Moore (born Kieron O'Hanrahan, Irish: Ciarán Ó hAnnracháin; 5 October 1924 – 15 July 2007) was an Irish actor, journalist and social activist. He played leading and supporting roles in both Britain and Hollywood from the late 1940s through the 1960s, notably portraying Count Vronsky in the 1948 film adaptation of Anna Karenina starring Vivien Leigh.

After retiring from acting in the 1970s, Moore joined the Catholic Agency for Overseas Development and became an associate editor of the newspaper The Universe.

== Early years ==
Moore was raised in County Cork in an Irish-speaking household. His father was Peadar Ó hAnnracháin (born 1873) (also known as Peter/Peadar Hourihane and Peadar O'Hourihane) was a writer and poet, and a staunch supporter of the Irish language. His mother, Máire Ní Dheasmhumhnaigh (born 1888), was also known as Mary Desmond.

Several members of Moore's family pursued careers in the arts. His sister Neasa Ní Annracháin was a stalwart of the Raidió Éireann Players, while his brother, Fachtna, was director of music at the station, and a second sister, Bláithín Ní Annracháin, played the harp with the National Symphony Orchestra. Following his family's move to Dublin, Moore attended Coláiste Mhuire, an Irish-language school.

Later, his medical studies at University College Dublin were cut short when he was invited to join the players at the Abbey Theatre.

== Career ==
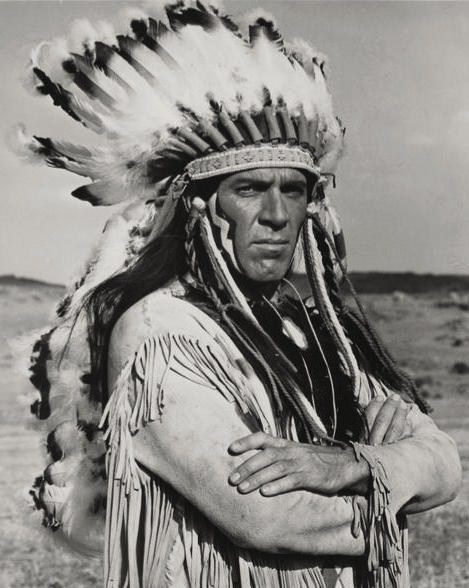
Moore in Custer of the West (1967)

Moore began his acting career at the Abbey Theatre in Dublin, and made his British stage debut at the age of 19 as Heathcliff in a production of Wuthering Heights. He featured in the West End in the 1945 war play Desert Rats by Colin Morris.

His first film role was as an IRA man in The Voice Within (1946), where he was billed as "Keiron O'Hanrahan".

He acted on the Liverpool stage in Purple Dust. He gave an acclaimed performance in the West End hit Red Roses for Me (written by Seán O'Casey). This was seen by Alexander Korda, who signed Moore to a long-term contract.

Korda announced he was likely to become a major star:

He has a brilliant acting talent. Then he has six-feet-two of brawn, a mobile photogenic face, rich expressive eyes, and ability to adapt himself to any type of role – ultra romantic or the last word in villainy. Very soon he will be one of the big names on the world's screens."

Adopting the stage name Kieron Moore, he was cast in a leading role in A Man About the House (1947), directed by Leslie Arliss. Arliss said Moore was "terrific. Naturally, since he's had no film experience, his work is still a bit rough, but he does the right thing by instinct. He smashes through at you from the screen."

There followed the psychological thriller Mine Own Executioner (1947), co-starring with Burgess Meredith.

Korda then gave Moore the plum role of the suave Count Vronsky in Julien Duvivier's production of Anna Karenina (1948), which starred Vivien Leigh and Ralph Richardson. The movie was a box-office flop, and Moore received the worst notices of his career. He played Heathcliff in a BBC Television adaptation of Wuthering Heights in 1948.

Korda's fourth film with him was a comedy set in Ireland, Saints and Sinners (1949), directed by Arliss. Moore went to France to co-star with Michèle Morgan in Marc Allégret's Maria Chapdelaine (1950), also known as The Naked Heart.

=== Hollywood ===
Moore was invited to Hollywood, where in 1951 he made two films, playing Uriah the Hittite in the biblical epic David and Bathsheba, supporting Gregory Peck and Susan Hayward, and a French Foreign Legion corporal in Ten Tall Men, starring Burt Lancaster. Both were supporting roles.

Moore went to Italy to play the lead in an Italian-English comedy, Honeymoon Deferred (1951). In France, he had a small role in another film for Allegret, La demoiselle et son revenant (1952).

=== British B films ===
Moore was in a British B film, Mantrap (1953), for Hammer Films, supporting Paul Henreid.

He had the lead in Recoil (1953, directed by John Gilling), Conflict of Wings (1954) and The Blue Peter (1954).

He supported Michael Redgrave in The Green Scarf (1954). "Thank heavens for this", Moore said. "I've had a rough time of it, especially during the last three years. Now perhaps I can re-establish myself as an actor."

It did not happen. Moore had the lead in the Danzinger Brothers' Satellite in the Sky (1956) and returned to Hammer for The Steel Bayonet (1957).

He directed some episodes of The Vise in 1956-57 and was in Overseas Press Club – Exclusive!, and Three Sundays to Live (1957) for the Danzigers.

=== Supporting roles and occasional leads ===
Moore had supporting roles in Carol Reed's The Key (1958) and Robert Aldrich's The Angry Hills (1959) and had a memorable role as town bully Pony Sugrue in Walt Disney's Darby O'Gill and the Little People (1959), where he fought a young Sean Connery. He also guest-starred in Tales of the Vikings (1959).

He gave an impressive performance in the comedy-thriller The League of Gentlemen (1960), playing a homosexual former fascist and army officer recruited to take part in a big robbery. He also played opposite Patrick McGoohan in an episode of Danger Man titled 'The Sanctuary' (1960).

There followed roles in The Day They Robbed the Bank of England (1960), and The Siege of Sidney Street (1960), shot on location in Ireland.

Moore had the lead role in Doctor Blood's Coffin (1961), directed by Sidney J. Furie and supporting roles in I Thank a Fool (1962), The 300 Spartans, The Main Attraction (1962), The Day of the Triffids (1962) (for Philip Yordan), Girl in the Headlines (1963), and Hide and Seek (1964).

Moore did three more for Yordan, The Thin Red Line (1964), Crack in the World (1965) (the second disaster movie after 'Triffids' where his character's romantically linked to Janette Scott) and Bikini Paradise made at the same time, also with Scott , then Son of a Gunfighter (1965) (all second-billed and all shot in Spain) and Arabesque (1966). He had lead roles in Bikini Paradise (1967) (filmed in the Canary Islands) and Run Like a Thief (shot in Spain) (1967). In his final film, Custer of the West (1967), he played Chief Dull Knife, for Yordan, again shot in Spain.

He also made television appearances in such shows as Three Live Wires, Sir Francis Drake, Zero One, Boy Meets Girl, Department S in the 1969 episode Dead Men Die Twice as an international crime boss, Vendetta, Jason King, The Adventurer, The Protectors and Randall and Hopkirk (Deceased)—the last of these was in the episode "When the Spirit Moves You", as the villain Miklos Corri.

Moore created a TV series, Ryan International (1970), which he also starred in and wrote some episodes. It ran for ten episodes.

His last acting appearance was in an episode of The Zoo Gang (1974).

== Post-acting career ==
Moore quit acting in 1974, becoming a social activist on behalf of the Third World. He joined CAFOD (Catholic Agency for Overseas Development), with which he worked for nine years.

During that time he made two film documentaries, Progress of Peoples (Peru) and The Parched Earth (Senegal). Later, as projects manager, he travelled to the Middle East and India. He next became associate editor of The Universe, editing its supplement New Creation, which he transformed into the magazine New Day.

He last worked for television, providing voice-overs for Muiris Mac Conghail's RTÉ documentaries about the Aran Islands and the Blaskets.

== Personal life ==
On 4 December 1947 at St Patrick's Church, Soho Square, London, he married the English actress Barbara White (1923–2013) whom he acted with in The Voice Within (1946) and Mine Own Executioner (1947). The reception was in the Savoy Hotel. The couple had a daughter, Theresa (Soeur Miriame-Therese), and three sons, Casey, Colm and Seán.

Moore retired in 1994 to the Charente-Maritime in France, where he joined the church choir, became a hospital visitor, and enjoyed reading French, Spanish, English and Irish literature.

=== Death ===
Moore died in Charente-Maritime on 15 July 2007, aged 82.

== Selected filmography ==
- A Man About the House (1947) – Salvatore
- Mine Own Executioner (1947) – Adam Lucian
- Anna Karenina (1948) – Count Vronsky
- Saints and Sinners (1949) – Michael Kissane
- The Naked Heart (1950) – Lorenzo Suprenant
- Honeymoon Deferred (1951) – Rocco
- David and Bathsheba (1951) – Uriah
- Ten Tall Men (1951) – Corporal Pierre Molier
- Mantrap (1953) – Speight
- Recoil (1953) – Nicholas Conway
- Conflict of Wings (1954) – Squadron Leader Parsons
- The Green Scarf (1954) – Jacques
- The Blue Peter (1955) – Mike Merriworth
- Satellite in the Sky (1956) – Michael
- The Steel Bayonet (1957) – Capt. R. A. Mead
- Three Sundays to Live (1957) – Frank Martin
- The Key (1958) – Kane
- The Angry Hills (1959) – Andreas
- Darby O'Gill and the Little People (1959) – Pony Sugrue
- The League of Gentlemen (1960) – Stevens
- The Day They Robbed the Bank of England (1960) – Walsh
- The Siege of Sidney Street (1960) – Toska
- Doctor Blood's Coffin (1961) – Dr. Peter Blood
- The Day of the Triffids (1962) – Tom Goodwin
- I Thank a Fool (1962) – Roscoe
- The 300 Spartans (1962) – Ephialtes
- Marauders of the Sea (1962)
- The Main Attraction (1962) – Ricco Moreno
- Girl in the Headlines (1963) – Herter
- Hide and Seek (1964) – Paul
- The Thin Red Line (1964) – Lt. Band
- Crack in the World (1965) – Dr. Ted Rampion
- Son of a Gunfighter (1965) – Deputy Mace Fenton
- Arabesque (1966) – Yussef Kasim
- Run Like a Thief (1967) – Johnny Dent
- Bikini Paradise (1967) – Lt. Allison Fraser
- Custer of the West (1967) – Chief Dull Knife
