= Johnny Douglas (conductor) =

English composer (1920–2003)

- Born: John Henry Douglas; 19 June 1920; Hackney, London, England
- Died: 20 April 2003 (aged 82) Bognor Regis, West Sussex, England
- Genre: Easy listening
- Instrument: Piano
- Years active: 1939–2003
- Labels: Dulcima Records; RCA Records; Capitol Records

John Henry Douglas (19 June 1920 – 20 April 2003) was an English composer, pianist, musical director, conductor, and string arranger primarily working with film scores and orchestras. He recorded more 500 tracks for Decca Records, over 80 albums for RCA Records, and provided music for 36 films during his career. He was nominated for a BAFTA for his soundtrack for the 1970 film The Railway Children and led RCA'S Living Strings for many years. In addition to films, Douglas composed and conducted music for television series including Spider-Man and His Amazing Friends, Dungeons & Dragons, The Incredible Hulk, G.I. Joe: A Real American Hero, and The Transformers.

== Early years ==
John Henry Douglas was born in the Hackney district of London, England on 19 June 1920, the eldest of two sons. In Douglas' early years, the family moved to Bermondsey, another district of London, where his mother May was a housewife and his father John was later an alderman for the West Bermondsey Council. He showed an innate talent for music at a very young age; by two and a half, he could play a song he had heard on one of his father's records on the piano. At four, he started taking piano lessons and by 10, he was studying instruments and transpositions. By 12, he was arranging and writing music.

Douglas attended St. Olaves & St. Saviours on a government scholarship. At 13, he formed a dance band with his school friends which gained enough local reputation to win several awards. Following school, he worked as an accounts clerk and continued playing with his band. He joined the Royal Air Force, where he formed his own dance band. An arm injury prevented him from playing piano for about two years following the war, during which he concentrated on arranging and composing.

== Career ==
Douglas' first professional appearance as with the Neville Hughes Sextet in 1939 as a pianist in London's West End. Following his time in the war, he reached out to popular bandleaders and heard back from George Elrick, who hired him as a staff arranger. He arranged a number of BBC programs and for many famous bands including Bert Ambrose, Ted Heath, and Edmundo Ros. He also worked as an arranger for and pianist with the Cyril Stapleton Band. Douglas won a Jazz Jamboree Award from Melody Maker magazine in 1944 for "best arrangement/composition for [a] dance band."

He joined a music publisher in 1948 as a staff arranger and began writing for orchestras rather than dance bands. In 1953, he started scoring and conducting vocal backings for Decca, his first hit being Tex Ritter's High Noon. With Decca, he recorded over 500 titles, backed musicians such as Al Martino, and served as musical director for a number of hits. In 1958, he was invited to conduct a 61-person orchestra, with whom he played his own arrangements, at Kingsway Hall in London. That same year, he also became the main scorer for RCA's Living Strings series. He subsequently began working with Ethel Gabriel of New York City's branch of RCA. During this 25-year partnership, he scored and conducted more than 80 albums and received a gold disc for Feelings, a Living Strings record.

Douglas' broadcasting career began in 1955 with BBC, where he hosted the programme In the Still of the Night, which featured his own orchestra, the Johnny Douglas Orchestra In the 1960s, as he began moving towards film scoring, he hosted another radio show called Swing Song and arranged for stars such as Shirley Jones, Howard Keel, Vera Lynn, and Shirley Bassey. He won an award at the Cannes Film Festival for his work on the film The Traitors (1962) and was nominated for a BAFTA for The Railway Children. He conducted the Royal Philharmonic Orchestra for the film Dulcima (1971) and worked on 21 films for The Scales of Justice. During the 1970s, Douglas was a frequent guest on BBC Radio 2 programmes such as Open House, Top Tunes, After Seven, The Terry Wogan Show, and Charlie Chester's Sunday Soapbox.

In 1983, Douglas started Dulcima Records, a record label producing digitally recorded easy listening albums with different artists and with his own orchestra. The name comes from the 1971 film of the same title for which he had written the score. By the end of 1999, he had written and conducted his first two symphonic poems, The Conquest and The Aftermath, both recorded by an orchestra composed of his friends and colleagues.

== Death and legacy ==
Douglas died at his home in Bognor Regis on 20 April 2003 after several years of battling prostate cancer. He was survived by his wife, Marion, and two daughters, Norma and Martine, and three grandchildren; his son Martin preceded him in death in 1988. Douglas was married four times during his life.

Following his death, Dulcima Records licensed past recordings Douglas worked on throughout his career, the ninth of which was music from The Railway Children. In 2008, Dulcima acquired the rights from Sony Music and began releasing his Living Strings albums.

== Filmography ==
Douglas composed, arranged and conducted for the following selected films:

- Touch of Death (1961)
- The Traitors (1962)
- The Day of the Triffids (1963)
- The Hi-Jackers (1963)
- Strictly for the Birds (1964)
- Operation Mermaid (1963)
- Gunfighters of Casa Grande (1964)
- Crack in the World (1965)
- City of Fear (1965)
- Victim Five (1965)
- Mozambique (1965)
- Dateline Diamonds (1965)
- The Brides of Fu Manchu (1966)
- Kid Rodelo (1966)
- Circus of Fear (1966)
- Psycho-Circus (1967)
- Bikini Paradise (1967)
- Run Like a Thief (1967)
- The Funniest Man in the World (1969)
- The Railway Children (1970)
- Dulcima (1971)
- Risky Business (1983)
- G.I. Joe: The Movie (1987)
- Blue City Slammers (1988)
- Loser (2000)
- About Adam (2000)
- When Brendan Met Trudy (2000)

Films released postmortem include: A Cinderella Story (2004), Laws of Attraction (2004), Trick 'r Treat, (2009) and Playing for Keeps (2012).

== Collaborators ==
During his career, Douglas worked with a range of musical artists, including Shirley Abicair, Moira Anderson, Bert Ambrose, Shirley Bassey, Stanley Black, John Boulter, June Bronhill, Max Bygraves, Frank Chacksfield, Billy Cotton, Cyril Stapleton Band, Maggie Fitzgibbon, Susan Hampshire, Ted Heath, Anne Heywood, Vince Hill, Frankie Howerd, David Hughes Neville Jason, The Johnston Brothers, Shirley Jones, Howard Keel, Elizabeth Larner, Barbara Leigh, Joe Lossm Vera Lynn, Ken Mackintosh, Mantovani, Alfred Marks, Al Martino, Chas McDevitt, Kenneth McKellar, Mike Preston, Joan Regan, Tex Ritter, Malcolm Roberts, Edmundo Ros, Patricia Routledge, Lita Roza, Mike Sammes, Harry Secombe, Semprini, Anne Shelton, Barbra Streisand, Jimmy Tarbuck, Vico Torriani, Dickie Valentine, Frankie Vaughan, David Whitfield, Eric Winstone, Mark Wynter, Yana, and Jimmy Young
