= Child's Play (1954 film) =

British film by Margaret Thomson

- Opening titles
- Directed by: Margaret Thomson
- Written by: Don Sharp
- Produced by: Herbert Mason
- Starring: Mona Washbourne; Peter Martyn; Dorothy Alison; Ingeborg von Kusserow; Carl Jaffe; Ballard Berkeley; Peter Sallis; Christopher Beeny
- Cinematography: Denny Densham
- Edited by: John Legard
- Music by: Antony Hopkins
- Production company: Group Three Productions
- Distributed by: British Lion Film Corporation
- Release date: October 1954 (UK)
- Running time: 68 minutes
- Country: United Kingdom
- Language: English

Child's Play is a 1954 British science fiction film directed by Margaret Thomson and starring Mona Washbourne and Christopher Beeny. The script was by Don Sharp, who also worked on the film as an assistant.

== Plot ==
A group of children ("the holy terrors") manage to split the atom and thereby create a new form of popcorn.

== Cast ==
- Mona Washbourne as Miss Emily Goslett
- Christopher Beeny as Horatio Flynn (the holy terrors)
- Wendy Westcott as Mary Huxley (the holy terrors)
- Ian Smith as Tom Chizzler (the holy terrors)
- Anneke Wills as Alice Nightingale (the holy terrors)
- Ernest Scott as Ernest Chappell (the holy terrors)
- Patrick Wells as Hans Blotz (the holy terrors)
- Elain Sykes as Linda Cappel (the holy terrors)
- Peter Martyn as P.C. Parker
- Dorothy Alison as Margery Chappell
- Ingeborg von Kusserow as Lea Blotz (as Ingeborg Wells)
- Carl Jaffe as Carl Blotz
- Ballard Berkeley as Dr. Nightingale
- Joan Young as Mrs. Chizzler
- Robert Raglan as Police Superintendent
- Barbara Hicks as policewoman
- Jack May as Bob Crouch
- John Sharp as Police Sergeant Butler
- Wyndham Goldie as Director Atomic Research
- Mae Bacon as Mrs Briggs
- Molly Raynor as Mrs Cannon
- Peter Sallis as Bill (van driver)
- Robert Lankesheer as Prof. Chappel

== Production ==
Don Sharp had been in hospital for nearly two years with tuberculosis. When he came out, executives at Group 3 Films invited him to see if he had any ideas for a film and he pitched them Child's Play. He said Group 3's practice was to team an experienced producer with an inexperienced director so Herbert Mason was teamed with Margaret Thomson. Sharp called it "a good little picture" and he would work with Group 3 on several more occasions.

== Critical reception ==
The Monthly Film Bulletin wrote: "An engaging fantasy, done with good humour and a freshness that atones for the roughness of some of the edges. One could, perhaps, have wished a little more satire and a little less obvious farce; but the film is likeable, and will be enjoyed by adults as well as children."

Picturegoer wrote: "Director Margaret Thomson gets child performances that are touchingly real and diabolically funny. It's the child's world of make-believe that pokes sly fun at the adult world of hard fact. Mona Washbourne, as a fun-loving shopkeeper, Peter Martyn as a harassed policeman, and Dorothy Alison a bewildered mother, pitch in for the grown-ups with equal skill."

The Daily Film Renter wrote: "Carefree fun and games making hearty appeal to the youngsters. Group 3 pokes gentle fun at the atom bomb in this pleasantly characterised little comedy. ... The prevailing gaiety is a matter of unrestrained youthful high spirits, unabashed tiltings with the village policeman, and adolescent frolics with the prim owner of the local sweet shop."
