= Gold Raiders =

1951 film by Edward Bernds

- Directed by: Edward Bernds
- Written by: William Lively; Elwood Ullman
- Produced by: Bernard Glasser; Jack Schwarz
- Starring: George O'Brien; Moe Howard; Larry Fine; Shemp Howard; Sheila Ryan; Lyle Talbot; Clem Bevans; Monte Blue; John Merton; Hugh Hooker
- Cinematography: Paul Ivano
- Edited by: Fred Allen
- Music by: Alex Alexander; June Starr
- Production company: Jack Schwarz Productions
- Distributed by: United Artists
- Release date: September 9, 1951 (U.S.)
- Running time: 56 minutes
- Country: United States
- Language: English
- Budget: $50,000

Gold Raiders is a 1951 comedy Western film starring George O'Brien and the Three Stooges (Moe Howard, Larry Fine and Shemp Howard). The film was O'Brien's final starring role and the only feature film released during Shemp Howard's 1947–1955 tenure with the Three Stooges.

== Plot ==
In the Old West, the Three Stooges are peddlers plying their trade in a covered wagon. Saloon proprietor Taggart, who controls the town of Red Mesa, supervises a series of raids on goldmine consignments. The insurance company, sustaining frequent losses, sends former federal marshal George O'Brien to investigate the thefts. O'Brien recruits the Stooges to aid him in foiling the raids. One of the saloon regulars is the town drunk, Doc Mason, once a competent medical man. Taggart forces Mason to spy on O'Brien and get advance information about O'Brien's plans.

== Cast ==
- George O'Brien as George O'Brien
- Moe Howard as Moe
- Larry Fine as Larry
- Shemp Howard as Shemp
- Clem Bevans as Doc Mason
- Sheila Ryan as Laura Mason
- Lyle Talbot as Taggart
- Monte Blue as John Sawyer
- Fuzzy Knight as Sheriff
- Hugh Hooker as Sandy Evans
- John Merton as Clete
- Remy Paquet as Singer
- Andre Adoree as Bartender
- Roy Canada as Slim
- Bill Ward as Henchman

== Production ==
Gold Raiders was an attempt by independent producer Bernard Glasser to inaugurate a new Western series starring George O'Brien, an action star since John Ford's 1924 epic The Iron Horse and later a top attraction in Western and outdoor-adventure features.

The film marked the second and final feature film with Shemp Howard as part of the Three Stooges. The first had been the team's original screen appearance, Soup to Nuts (1930), featuring their original leader Ted Healy.

The straight plotline was written by B-picture specialist William Lively. Director Edward Bernds, who had directed Three Stooges shorts, enlisted the assistance of his frequent co-writer Elwood Ullman to insert special comedy material for the Stooges. Technically the film had excellent credentials, with veteran photographer Paul Ivano and longtime film editor Fred Allen contributing their talents. The 31-year-old supporting actor Hugh Hooker was a professional stuntman for four decades, and doubled for George O'Brien in some scenes.

Gold Raiders was slated for a 12-day filming schedule, then feasible for budget productions, the project encountered financial problems from the start. The drain on Bernard Glasser's finances necessitated a shorter shooting schedule, being cut from 12 days to 10, then to eight, and finally to five: December 26 to December 30, 1950 (originally scheduled for the first week of January, 1951). Faced with an impractical schedule for a feature film -- it took three or four days for Bernds to make a 17-minute short -- Bernds almost abandoned the project, only to remain when Glasser faced financial ruin otherwise. Reflecting on the hurried production, Bernds lamented the rushed conditions: "I should have never made that picture. It was an ultra-quickie shot in five days at a cost of $50,000 ($669,087 today), which, even then, was ridiculously low. I'm afraid the picture shows it!" The film was made in such a hurry that the supporting cast was hired almost at the last minute; trade publications announced the actors' participation at the end of December, while the film was in production.

Glasser's limited resources hampered promotional efforts. Publicity materials were sparse: a modest pressbook, and posters printed in only two colors. Glasser shopped the picture around in New York, and did secure major-studio distribution; independent producer Jack Schwarz, formerly with PRC, released Gold Raiders through United Artists. Gold Raiders was intended to be the first entry of a new series of O'Brien-Stooges westerns. The second film, Tramp Steamer, was to be filmed in color during March of 1951, but was never made. The O'Brien-Stooges series was abandoned when Glasser, Schwarz, and O'Brien joined forces to produce six dramatic features in Europe and America for United Artists release.

Glasser arranged for a British release of Gold Raiders in August 1951, under the new title The Stooges Go West.

== Reception ==
Reviews were mixed. Mandel Herbstman of Motion Picture Daily enjoyed the film: "Whoever conceived the idea of turning the Three Stooges loose on the range deserves applause. They play havoc with the [Western] formula. An example of their antics: when surrounded by outlaws who are firing at them furiously, they defend themselves with exploding cigars." Brian Lowry of Variety reported, "Gold Raiders is grooved for the Saturday-matinée market. Antics of the Three Stooges are strictly on a juvenile level and the lot is pretty much spelled out in words of one syllable. It's a mediocre low-budgeter. Lensing and production trappings are par for this kind of item."

Others were blunt. Film Bulletin called it "matinée filler": "Gold Raiders is a woefully poor western-with-comedy so ridden with clichés and slapstick, it might be thought an attempt at satirizing westerns. Unfortunately it is played straight [and] the cast, for the most part, is buried by the corny story, skimpy production, uneven cutting, and nonsensical dialogue, with the Three Stooges wielding their slapstick shovels to aid measurably in the interment. The very young and the rabid western fans may sit through this one without too much strain, but for anyone else it's strictly spinach."

Gold Raiders received renewed attention when United Artists reissued the film in theaters in 1958. The Stooges were then enjoying new popularity as their old short subjects began playing on local television stations, so some exhibitors may have shown the Gold Raiders reissue profitably.

== Home media ==
Television distributor Associated Artists Productions released two segments of the film on 8mm home-movie reels during the 1960s. Out of circulation for years, Gold Raiders was released on DVD in 2006 by Warner Bros.

== See also ==
- The Three Stooges filmography
