= Honeymoon Deferred (1951 film) =

1951 film

- Directed by: Mario Camerini
- Written by: Franco Brusati; Mario Camerini; Suso Cecchi D'Amico; Denis Freeman; John Hunter; Noel Langley; Antonio Pietrangeli
- Produced by: John Sutro; Joseph Janni
- Starring: Sally Ann Howes; Griffith Jones; Kieron Moore
- Cinematography: Geoffrey Faithfull; Otello Martelli
- Edited by: Adriana Novelli; Helga Cranston
- Music by: Nino Rota
- Production companies: Società Italiana Cines; Vic Film
- Distributed by: British Lion Films
- Release date: 18 October 1951
- Running time: 79 minutes
- Countries: Italy; United Kingdom
- Languages: Italian; English

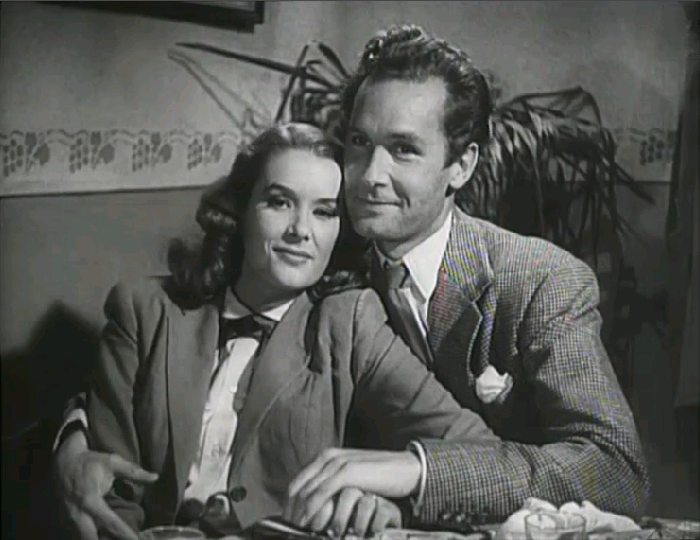
Still from Due mogli sono troppe (1951)

Honeymoon Deferred (Italian: Due mogli sono troppe) is a 1951 British-Italian comedy film directed by Mario Camerini and starring Sally Ann Howes, Griffith Jones, and Kieron Moore.

The film's sets were designed by the art directors Gianni Polidori and Ivan King. It was partly shot on location in Italy, and was one of two co-productions in Italy that producer Joseph Janni oversaw during the period, along with the melodrama The Glass Mountain (1949). Separate English- and Italian-language versions were released.

== Plot ==
A British couple honeymooning in Italy plan to visit Rome and take in the opera and the various historical sights of the city. However, after taking the wrong train, they end up in the village where the husband, David, had fought and taken shelter as a British Army officer during the Second World War. Regarded as a hero by the villagers, it soon becomes apparent that one of the local woman is claiming that David has already married her and is the father of her young child named Churchill.

== Curiosity ==
The film was shot almost entirely in Colli a Volturno, in the province of Isernia in Molise even if in fiction the town is called Poppi del Sangro.

== Main cast ==
- Sally Ann Howes as Katherine Fry
- Griffith Jones as David Fry
- Kieron Moore as Rocco
- Lea Padovani as Rosina Maggini
- Ada Dondini as Mama Pia
- Luigi Moneta as Grandpa Maggini
- David Keir as Professore
- Pietro Meloni as Churchill
- Roger Moore as Ornithologist on a Train
