= Waverley Steps (film) =

Documentary film

- Directed by: John Eldridge
- Written by: John Sommerfield
- Produced by: Paul Fletcher
- Cinematography: Roland Stafford
- Edited by: John Trumper
- Production company: Greenpark Productions in association with the Film Producers' Guild
- Release date: 1948
- Running time: 30 minutes
- Country: UK
- Language: English

Waverley Steps is a 1948 dramatised documentary film depicting a period of 30 hours in the life of people in Edinburgh, Scotland. It was directed by John Eldridge, produced by Paul Fletcher for Greenpark Productions and sponsored by the Scottish Home Office for the Central Office of Information. It had its premier at the second Edinburgh Film Festival in 1948. Unusually for a government-sponsored film, it also received a cinema release.

The film's title is a reference to a flight of steps at Edinburgh's Waverley Station. However, the steps themselves do not feature in the film.

== Synopsis ==
According to an opening caption, the film is a "glimpse into the lives of a few of [Edinburgh's] citizens between 5 o'clock one Sunday afternoon and late the following night". The story is told as a series of overlapping vignettes.

The film opens with shots of two Class A4 steam locomotives: Union of South Africa approaching Waverley Station and No. 27 Merlin heading west through Princes Street Gardens. At the depot, the fireman leaves the Merlin to cycle to join his wife who is watching from a tenement window overlooking the railway.

The next morning, a coalman drives his cart to a blacksmith in Leith to have his horse shod. As he passes the docks, a Danish seaman is leaving his ship for a day's shore leave. The sailor takes a tram to Princes Street where he asks directions to Edinburgh Castle but has difficulty making himself understood. A business-woman (Miss Nimmo) gives him directions in fluent Danish. She then goes into the RBS offices in Dundas House where she has an argument with a banker over the terms of a family trust.

While the coalman is delivering coals in Moray Place, an advocate leaves his house to drive to work. His car narrowly avoids the Danish seaman who is looking the wrong way when crossing the road. The advocate arrives at court where he is prosecuting a man accused of bigamy.

A female medical student, Miss Cunningham, arrives for a lecture. She exchanges friendly glances with a male student seated nearby. On leaving the medical school, they make a date to attend a dance at the students union that evening.

The seaman wonders into St Giles' Cathedral where the organist is rehearsing. The One O'clock Gun is heard and several people are seen checking their watches. The coalman approaches a bookie's runner to place a bet on a dog. In the court room, the jury finds the bigamist guilty. Meanwhile, the banker reluctantly agrees to Miss Nimmo's demands regarding the family trust. As the female student emerges from a bookshop, she passes the seaman who goes into a newsagent to buy cigarettes.

In East Market Street, the coalman buys the afternoon newspaper (which reports the trial of the bigamist) and reads that the dog he bet on has won.

That evening, the medical students meet for their date. As they make their way to the dance, the advocate and his wife take their seats at the theatre where a performance of Swan Lake is about to begin.

At the end of the evening, the students walk home and kiss goodnight. The seaman, accompanied by his new friend the coalman, leaves a pub the worst for drink and returns to his ship. The fireman leaves his flat to return to the Merlin, his wife watching from the window.

== Cast ==
Most of the cast were amateur players, recruited for the film by the Gateway Theatre. A notable exception was N. K. Stroyberg (born 1926), who played the Danish seaman. Stroyberg was working in Edinburgh at the time and took part in the film on a part-time basis.

== Production ==
The film was the idea of Forsyth Hardy, a film critic and writer who was head of information at the Scottish Office at the time. While in Stockholm researching a book on Scandinavian cinema, Hardy became familiar with the work of Swedish director Arne Sucksdorff and was especially attracted to his Rhythm of a City. Hardy took a copy of that film back to Scotland to show to Eldridge and his colleagues at Greenpark Productions with a view to making a film about Edinburgh in a similar style. John Summerfield produced a treatment, and this was shown to Sir Charles Cunningham, the head of the Scottish Home Department and "something of film buff" (he was a founder member of the Edinburgh Film Guild). Cunningham approved government sponsorship for the proposed film.

According to David Bruce, there was "a continuing tension between the film-makers and the Edinburgh establishment". The local council was unhappy with the original treatment showing an encounter between the Danish sailor and a prostitute. The New Club, where the banker is seen taking coffee, insisted that no actual members should appear in the scene.

Hardy took a copy of the finished film back to Stockholm to show to Sucksdorff. The Swedish director said that he could "see clearly the influence of Rhythm of a City but thought Waverley Steps was much the better film".

== Locations ==
At Eldridge's insistence, authentic locations were used throughout the film. Most of these would have been immediately recognisable to the audiences of the day. They include Leith Docks, Waverley Station, Princes Street, Calton Road, the Mound, Middle Meadow Walk, East Market Street, George IV Bridge, Glengyle Terrace and Moray Place.

Interior scenes were shot in St Cuthbert's Church, the Royal Bank offices in St Andrew Square, Old Parliament Hall, St Giles Cathedral, the Gateway Theatre and the University of Edinburgh Medical Building.

== Music ==
The organ music heard during the sailor's visit to St Giles Cathedral is the Widor Toccata. It is played in the film by Herrick Bunney, who was Master of Music at the cathedral from 1946 to 1996.

The band playing at the student dance is the Ernie Caldwell Band, playing a jazz version of Comin' Thro' the Rye.

== Critical response ==
In a contemporary review in the News Chronicle, Richard Winnington described Waverley Steps as "a crisp, rhythmic film with a brain and a wit behind it. … This half-hour film has, in fact, something which should be pursued and developed."

Writing in 1996, David Bruce says that the film "has a decent claim to be the best film made about Edinburgh". He adds that "despite the odd lapse, Waverley Steps is a remarkably fine film, as successful an evocation of a city as you are likely to come across anywhere."

Writing in 2015, Patrick Russell, senior curator at the British Film Institute, praised the film's "crystal-clear photography and the … many quietly reflective passages [giving] it a real breath-of-fresh-air quality". But he describes it as "something less than a masterpiece: it's a thoroughly contrived piece of filmmaking which won't appeal to everyone."

The film has also been compared to German expressionist films of the interwar period, notably Berlin: Die Sinfonie der Großstadt) (1927) and Menschen am Sonntag (1930).

== Home media ==
Panamint Cinema released a Region 0 PAL DVD of the film in 2013. The disc also includes Jean L. Gray's film Northern Capital (1937), and Edinburgh, a 1966 film by Henry Cooper.
