= George Thomson (naturalist) =

New Zealand biologist and politician

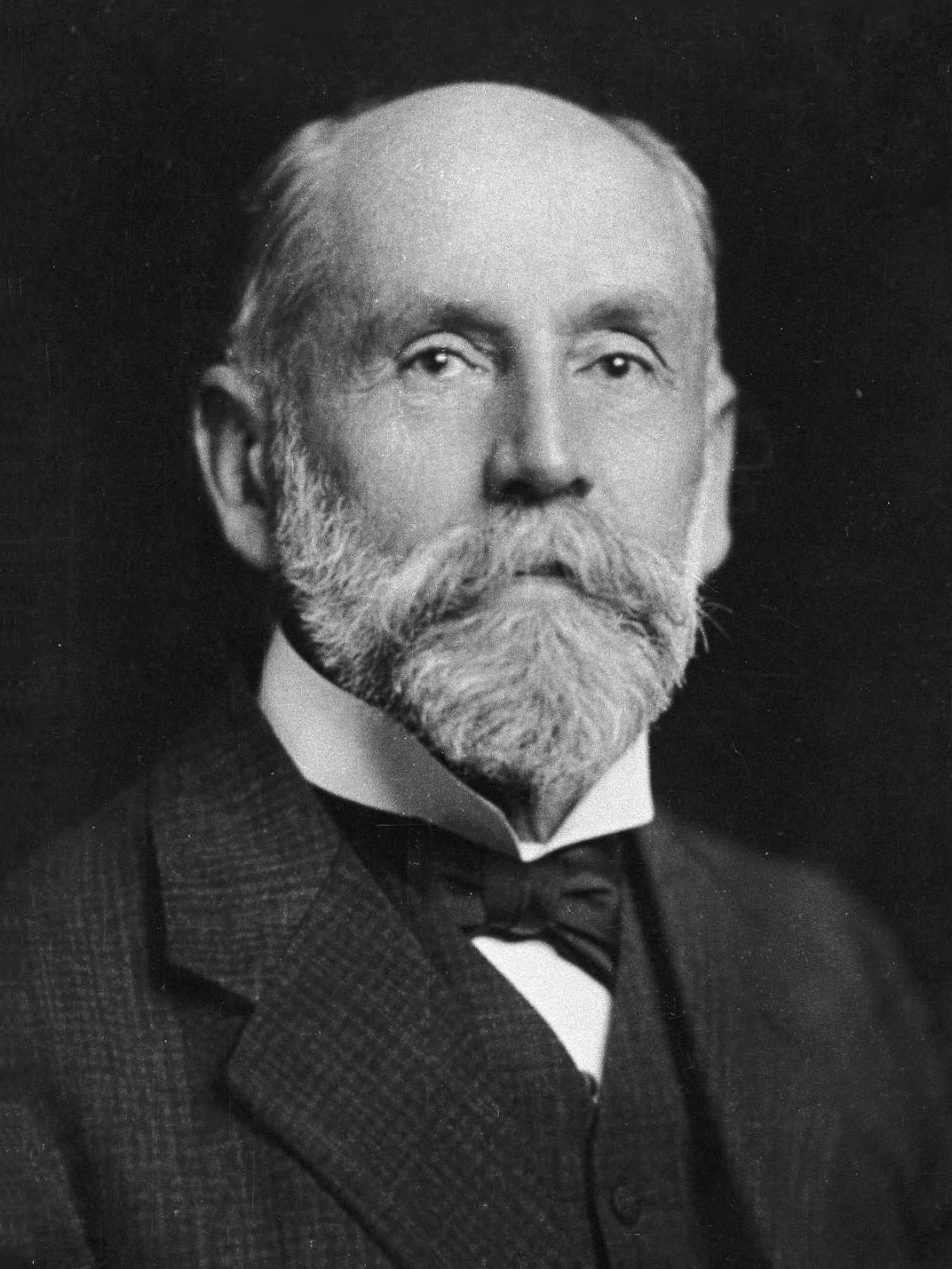
Thomson c. 1918

George Malcolm Thomson (2 October 1848 – 25 August 1933) was a New Zealand scientist, educationalist, social worker and politician.

== Biography ==
New Zealand Parliament
Years	Term	Electorate	Party
1908–1909	17th	Dunedin North	Independent
1909–1911	Changed allegiance to:		Reform
1911–1914	18th	Dunedin North	Reform

Born on 2 October 1848 in Calcutta, Thomson grew up in Scotland, being educated at the Edinburgh High School and the University of Edinburgh. At the age of 20, he emigrated to New Zealand, and, apart from a short period farming at Mabel Bush, Southland, spent the rest of his life in Dunedin. He was said to "know his Dunedin like a book".

Thomson's scientific interests were wide, including fisheries, crustaceans and the naturalisation of species. Thomson was one of the first scientists to recognise the potential for invasive species to be introduced via ship's ballast. He helped establish the Portobello Marine Laboratory in 1904.

Outside science, he founded many organisations, and was a member of the New Zealand Parliament for Dunedin North from the 1908 election for two parliamentary terms to 1914 and a member of the Legislative Council from 7 May 1918 for two seven year terms until 6 May 1932.

Thomson was President of the Royal Society of New Zealand between 1907 and 1909; preceded by James Hector and followed by Augustus Hamilton.

His son, James Allan Thomson, was New Zealand's first Rhodes Scholar and later Director of the Dominion Museum, Wellington. George Thomson died in Dunedin on 25 August 1933.

New Zealand Parliament
Preceded by Alfred Richard Barclay	Member of Parliament for Dunedin North; 1908–1911	Succeeded by Andrew Walker
