= James Tormé =

American jazz musician (born 1973)

James Tormé (born August 13, 1973) is a jazz and pop vocalist based in Los Angeles, California. He is the son of American singer Mel Tormé and British actress Janette Scott and grandson of Thora Hird. His siblings include television writer Tracy Tormé (d. 2024) and voice artist Daisy Tormé.

Tormé won the Chuck Niles Jazz Music Award in 2007 after reaching the finals at the Temecula Valley International Jazz Festival with his independent release Comin' Home. He signed with KOCH Records (now MNRK Music Group) in 2008 and his subsequent debut album 'Comin' Home' featured a song which won the 2009 John Lennon Songwriting Award for the jazz category.

== Early life ==
Tormé grew up between Los Angeles and London, immersed in jazz through his father's associations and extensive listening to recordings during transatlantic travel, blending classic jazz with contemporary influences.

== Career ==
Tormé released Comin' Home (mid-2000s, independent), which helped secure his 2007 award and label deal.

His debut full-length album, Love for Sale (2011, eOne/Tormé Jazz), featured jazz standards, originals (including the 2009 John Lennon Songwriting Award winner "A Better Day Will Come" in the jazz category), and pop reinterpretations like Michael Jackson's "Rock with You." The album charted on jazz platforms including iTunes and Amazon, with strong smooth jazz radio airplay for the single.

Tormé has performed with major ensembles and at venues and festivals such as the BBC Concert Orchestra and Guy Barker Big Band (live broadcast on BBC Radio 2's Sunday Night is Music Night: Celebrating the Music of Ray Charles from Cheltenham Jazz Festival in May 2012, co-starring Gregory Porter and Madeline Bell), Love Supreme Jazz Festival (well-attended performance at the Ronnie Scott's Big Top Stage in 2014), Ronnie Scott's Jazz Club in London (including five sold-out shows September 13–15, 2025, for the Mel Tormé centennial with Iain Mackenzie, Emma Smith, and the Callum Au Big Band), Birdland (New York jazz club) (sold-out multi-date holiday run with Veronica Swift in December 2019, featuring two shows per night honoring Mel Tormé and Ella Fitzgerald), the Greek Theatre (Los Angeles), Walt Disney Concert Hall, and various jazz festivals.

In the U.K., he hosted a weekly radio show on Jazz FM (UK), including James Tormé’s The Jazz Singers and Sunday Afternoon With James Tormé from 2013.

== Reception ==
Critics have highlighted Tormé's vocal strength, range, and versatility. Andrew Cartmel in London Jazz News (2014) called his voice "extraordinarily powerful," likening its control to "a tiger on a leash," and described him as "an extraordinary singer with immense resources." Frank Griffith in the same publication (2013) praised his "sensational vocal artistry and showmanship," "stupendous range and agility," and scatting prowess. Steve Murray in Cabaret Scenes (2016) noted his voice as "less velvet, more sharkskin" than his father's, emphasizing charisma and eclectic style.

In 2011, the New York Post selected Tormé's cover of "Comin’ Home Baby" as one of the top 40 cover recordings of the decade, calling him "smooth and cool."

== Discography ==
Selected

- Comin' Home (mid-2000s, independent)
- Love for Sale (2011, eOne/Tormé Jazz)
