= Night Beat (1947 film) =

- Song sheet tie-in with Christine Norden
- Directed by: Harold Huth
- Written by: Guy Morgan; T. J. Morrison
- Produced by: Harold Huth
- Starring: Anne Crawford; Maxwell Reed; Ronald Howard; Hector Ross; Christine Norden
- Cinematography: Václav Vích
- Edited by: Grace Garland
- Music by: Benjamin Frankel
- Production companies: Harold Huth Productions; British Lion Films
- Distributed by: British Lion Film Corporation (UK)
- Release date: 22 December 1947 (Sweden)
- Running time: 91 minutes
- Country: United Kingdom
- Language: English
- Budget: £175,118
- Box office: £153,438 (UK)

Night Beat is a 1947 British Brit noir crime thriller drama film directed by Harold Huth and starring Anne Crawford, Maxwell Reed, Ronald Howard, Hector Ross, Christine Norden and Sid James. It was written by Guy Morgan and T. J. Morrison.

Sky Movies described the film as a "British thriller that examines a challenging issue of its times: the problems encountered by servicemen when trying to adjust to civilian life."

== Plot ==
Following the Second World War, two former soldiers who are friends go their separate ways; one joins the Metropolitan Police while the other becomes a racketeer in post-war London.

== Cast ==
- Anne Crawford as Julie Kendall
- Maxwell Reed as Felix Fenton
- Ronald Howard as Andy Kendall
- Christine Norden as Jackie
- Hector Ross as Don Brady
- Fred Groves as PC Kendall
- Sidney James as Nixon
- Nicholas Stuart as Rocky
- Frederick Leister as Magistrate
- Michael Medwin as Spider
- Robert Cawdron as Police recruit
- Philip Stainton as Detective Sergeant Slack

== Box office ==
As of 30 June 1949 the film earned £118,578 in the UK of which £90,028 went to the producer.

== Critical reception ==
The Monthly Film Bulletin wrote: "With the possible exception of Andy, the characters in the story fail to arouse one's sympathy. Some distressing things happen to them, but the settings are, in the main, so unreal and the dialogue so inadequate that it is difficult to take any overwhelming interest in the development of the plot. The acting is not outstanding – Maxwell Reed, as Felix, does his best, but is hampered by his lines, and Anne Crawford has even less chance to display her abilities. ... Harold Huth directs competently but without enough originality to make the film any more than average entertainment. Once again Benjamin Frankel offers a score that is well-constructed and subtly shaded. Its integration with the dialogue is quite exceptionally successful."

Kine Weekly wrote: "Highly coloured romantic melodrama, set in London's underworld. Its account of the adventures and misadventures of two ex-commando coppers opens well, but after the half-way mark it loses its breezy and disarming sense of comedy and hastily introduces a sordid and sensational sex interest. Uneven, artificial, protracted and transparent, it's unlikely to make much of a stir outside of industrial halls."

Picture Show wrote: "Somewhat lurid melodrama of the adventures of two ex-commandos on entering civilian life, the first half of this film is by far the best. It has some good players in it, but they are not called on for their best by any means."

The Radio Times wrote, "a relishably bad British crime drama set in an unreal Soho underworld of spivs and nightclubs. It's a compendium of clichés ... Benjamin Frankel's score is better than the film deserves."

Allmovie wrote, "though its starts out strong, Night Beat metamorphoses into standard melodramatics towards the end."

Britmovie wrote, "fast-paced British crime melodrama ...The two lead actors are particularly wooden and it's left to the supporting cast to add some lowlife colour; particularly Maxwell Reed's smug villain, Christine Norden as the vampish blonde, Sid James [sic] piano playing snout and a brief appearance by Michael Medwin as an indignant petty crook."
