= Agulhasia =

Scientific classification
- Kingdom: Animalia
- Phylum: Brachiopoda
- Class: Rhynchonellata
- Order: Terebratulida
- Family: Chlidonophoridae
- Genus: Agulhasia

Genus of brachiopods

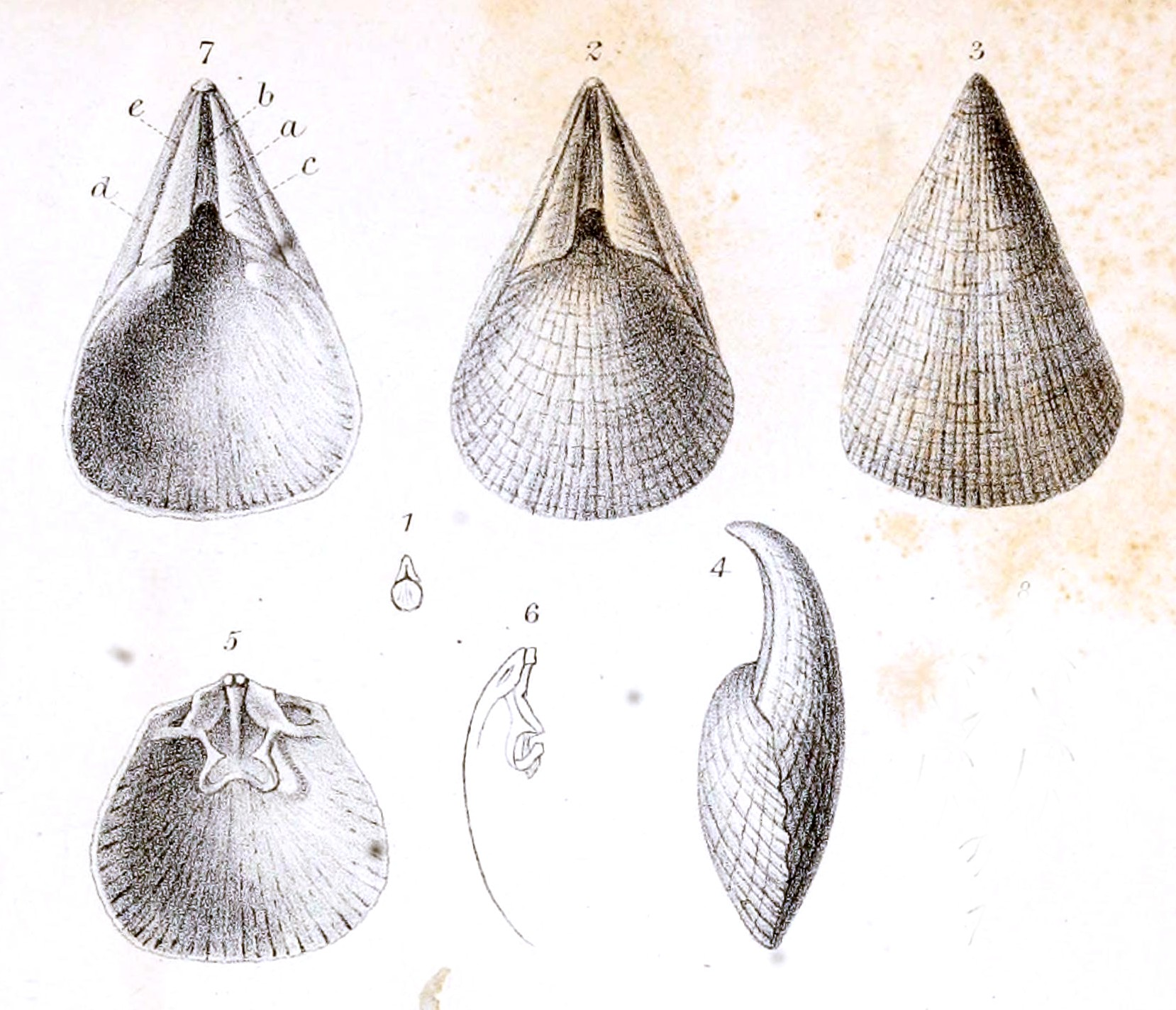
Agulhasia davidsoni

Agulhasia is a genus of brachiopods belonging to the family Chlidonophoridae.

The species of this genus are found in South African Republic.

Species:

- Agulhasia davidsoni King, 1871
- Agulhasia densicostata Cooper, 1988
