= Deslongchampsithyris =

Deslongchampsithyris Temporal range: Sinemurian–Pliensbachian, 191–183 Ma

Scientific classification
- Domain: Eukaryota
- Kingdom: Animalia
- Phylum: Brachiopoda
- Class: Rhynchonellata
- Order: Terebratulida
- Family: Chlidonophoridae
- Genus: †Deslongchampsithyris; Lee & Tchorszhevsky, 2006

Species
- Deslongchampsithyris kamyshani; Deslongchampsithyris moisseevi

Genus of brachiopods

Deslongchampsithyris is a genus of brachiopods in the family Chlidonophoridae.

== Existence ==
Fossils of Deslongchampsithyris show that species of Deslongchampsithyris existed around 191–183 MYA in the Early Jurassic epoch. There are two occurrences of fossils of the genus, one for each of the species. A fossil of Deslongchampsithyris moisseevi has been discovered in Ukraine and Deslongchampsithyris kamyshani in Georgia, both near the Black Sea.

== Characteristics ==
Species of Deslongchampsithyris are blind like all other species of Rhynconellata. They are stationary and attach to surfaces, like all other Brachiopods. They are filter feeders(also known as suspension feeders) and their diet consists of suspended food particles (usually phytoplankton). They have a taphonomy of low mg calcite like all other Brachiopods.

== Subtaxa ==
Deslongchampsithyris has 2 species, both of which are extinct.

- Deslongchampsithyris kamyshani
- Deslongchampsithyris moisseevi (Basionym Deslongchampsithyris moiseevi)
