= Bernard Glasser =

American film director

Glasser in 2012

Bernard M. Glasser (June 3, 1924 – January 2, 2014) was an American film producer and director. The first film he produced was Gold Raiders. After many years he retired from the business to go into real estate. He lived in Los Angeles with his wife Joan.

== Life and career ==
Glasser was a native of Chicago. He saw his first film at a young age, which sparked an interest in filmmaking for him. Growing up, he had wanted to become a filmmaker, but had to wait until after World War II. He got his first job as a production assistant while working as a substitute teacher for Beverly Hills High School.

From then on, Glasser worked on many films, making his debut as a producer on the Three Stooges film Gold Raiders (1951). The film's director, Edward Bernds, recalled that "I should have walked out on the project. I didn't because the producer, Bernard Glasser, pleaded that he would lose everything he owned if I didn't do the picture." The film was released to negative reviews.

Glasser's other credits include Space Master X-7 (1958) and The Return of the Fly (1959). He also produced the television series Assignment Underwater (1960-1962). He also sometimes directed films, like The Sergeant Was a Lady (1961), Run Like a Thief (1968), and Triangle (1970). Eventually, he retired from the film business to go into real estate.

Glasser was a graduate of Indiana State University. In 2012, he received a distinguished alumni award from the institute.

Glasser and his wife Joan lived in Los Angeles. He died on January 2, 2014, and was survived by four children and eight grandchildren. He was predeceased by his son Richard, who died in 2010.

== Filmography ==
=== As producer ===
- Gold Raiders (1951)
- The Storm Rider (1957)
- Escape from Red Rock (1957)
- Space Master X-7 (1958)
- Alaska Passage (1959)
- Return of the Fly (1959)
- Assignment: Underwater (1960–61)
- The Sergeant Was a Lady (1961)
- The Day of the Triffids (1963)
- The Thin Red Line (1964)
- Crack in the World (1965)
- Bikini Paradise (1967)
- Run Like a Thief (1968)
- Triangle (1970)

=== As director ===
- The Sergeant Was a Lady (1961)
- Run Like a Thief (1968)
- Triangle (1970)

=== As screenwriter ===
- The Sergeant Was a Lady (1961)
