= The Sergeant Was a Lady =

American 1961 film directed, produced, and written by Bernard Glasser

- Theatrical release poster
- Directed by: Bernard Glasser
- Screenplay by: Bernard Glasser
- Produced by: Bernard Glasser
- Starring: Martin West; Venetia Stevenson; Bill Williams; Catherine McLeod; Roy Engel; Gregg Martell
- Cinematography: Hal McAlpin
- Edited by: John F. Link
- Production company: Twincraft Productions
- Distributed by: Universal Pictures
- Release date: October 4, 1961
- Running time: 72 minutes
- Country: United States
- Language: English

The Sergeant Was a Lady is a 1961 American comedy film written and directed by Bernard Glasser. The film stars Martin West, Venetia Stevenson, Bill Williams, Catherine McLeod, Roy Engel, and Gregg Martell. The film was released on October 4, 1961, by Universal Pictures.

== Cast ==
- Martin West as Cpl. Gale Willard
- Venetia Stevenson as Sgt. Judy Fraser
- Bill Williams as Col. House
- Catherine McLeod as Maj. Hay
- Roy Engel as Sgt. Bricker
- Gregg Martell as Red Henning
- Chickie Lind as Lenore Bliss
- Jomarie Pettitt as Marge McKay
- Mari Lynn as Rose Miller
- Joan Barry as Rita Waters
- Francine York as Tina Baird
- Rhoda Williams as Lt. Witt
- Doris Fesette as Lt. Read
- Lonnie Blackman as Capt. Beal
- Richard Emory as Maj. Zilker
- James Dale as Sgt. Thomas
- Dan White as Gen. Payson
- Hal Torey as Col. Burns
- John Mitchum as MP #1
- Michael Masters as MP #2
