= Run Like a Thief =

1967 film directed by Bernard Glasser

- Directed by: Bernard Glasser
- Written by: Myron J. Gold
- Produced by: Bernard Glasser; Tíbor Reves; Harry Spalding
- Starring: Kieron Moore; Ina Balin; Keenan Wynn
- Cinematography: Federico G. Larraya; Jack Willoughby
- Edited by: Nicholas Wentworth
- Music by: Johnny Douglas
- Production companies: Coral Producciones Cinematográficas; Harold Goldman Associates; Twincraft Productions
- Distributed by: Feature Film Corpatopm of America (US); Warner-Pathé Distributors (UK)
- Release date: October 11, 1967
- Running time: 92 minutes
- Countries: Spain; United States
- Language: English

Run Like a Thief (Spanish: Robo de diamantes) is a 1967 American-Spanish comedy crime film directed by Bernard Glasser and starring Kieron Moore, Ina Balin and Keenan Wynn. A soldier of fortune makes off with a fortune in diamonds, but has to go to great lengths to evade his pursuers.

The film's sets were designed by the art director Santiago Ontañón. Location shooting took place in Spain at Madrid and Guadalajara

== Cast ==
- Kieron Moore as Johnny Dent
- Ina Balin as Mona Shannon
- Keenan Wynn as Willy Gore
- Fernando Rey as Col. Romero
- Charles Regnier as Piet de Jonge
- Victor Maddern as Abel Baker
- Sancho Gracia as Wes
- Bobby Hall as Whitey Keller
- Mike Brendel as Turk
- Luis Rivera as Young Lieutenant
- Román Ariznavarreta as Ernie
- Joe Zboran as Benny
- Xan das Bolas as Gonzalez
- Vicente Roca as Shipping Clerk
- Jerzy Radlowsky as Bert
- Charles Siegmund as Carl
- Pedro Barbero as Peters
- Scott Miller as Rolf

== Bibliography ==
- Esteve Riambau & Casimiro Torreiro. Productores en el cine español: estado, dependencias y mercado. Cátedra, 2008.
