= The Blue Peter (1955 film) =

British film by Wolf Rilla

- Directed by: Wolf Rilla
- Written by: Don Sharp; John Pudney
- Based on: an original story by Don Sharp
- Produced by: Herbert Mason
- Starring: Kieron Moore; Greta Gynt
- Cinematography: Arthur Grant
- Edited by: John Trumper
- Music by: Antony Hopkins
- Production companies: Group Three Productions; Beaconsfield Productions
- Distributed by: British Lion Film Corporation (UK)
- Release date: November 1955 (UK)
- Running time: 93 minutes
- Country: United Kingdom
- Language: English

The Blue Peter (US title Navy Heroes) is a 1955 British film directed by Wolf Rilla and starring Kieron Moore and Greta Gynt. It was written by Don Sharp and John Pudney. It was released in the United States in December 1957. The film is about youth seamanship at the original Outward Bound in Aberdyfi, Wales, a program similar to Sea Scouting or Sea Cadets.

== Premise ==
Shellshocked following his experiences as a POW, naval war hero Mike Merriworth enrols as a physical instructor at an Outward Bound sea school in Wales, and discovers new purpose shaping the lives of the boys in his charge.

== Cast ==
- Kieron Moore as Mike Merriworth
- Greta Gynt as Mary Griffin
- Sarah Lawson as Gwyneth Thomas
- Mervyn Johns as Captain Snow
- Mary Kerridge as Mrs Snow
- Harry Fowler as Charlie Barton
- John Charlesworth as Andrew Griffin
- Anthony Newley as Fred Starling
- Brian Roper as Tony Mullins
- Edwin Richfield as Number One
- Richard Bennett as Roger
- William Ingram as Karl

== Production ==
It was one of several scripts Don Sharp wrote for Group Three. He had an idea for a film about the Outward Bound Program and researched it at a camp in Wales. Sharp also worked on the film as a second unit director.

== Critical reception ==
The Monthly Film Bulletin wrote: "Conscientious but hardly inspired, the film fails sufficiently to communicate the central character's mental uncertainty, so that he too often appears little more than a self-pitying boor. It is the youngsters who mainly command the attention; and the final scenes, where a routine hike in the Welsh mountains almost ends in disaster, are effectively done. Despite its faults, the film manages to convey an agreeable open-air atmosphere."

In British Sound Films: The Studio Years 1928–1959 David Quinlan rated the film as "good", writing: "Persuasive story has genuine warmth, grips and thrills in the right places."

TV Guide wrote, "Several humorous scenes of camping life and a lively group of youngsters brighten an otherwise routine programmer."
