= The Traitors (film) =

1962 British thriller by Robert Tronson

- U.S. half sheet poster
- Directed by: Robert Tronson
- Written by: J. Levy; Jim O'Connolly
- Produced by: Jim O'Connolly
- Starring: Patrick Allen; Jacqueline Ellis; James Maxwell
- Cinematography: Michael Reed
- Edited by: Peter Boita
- Music by: Johnny Douglas
- Production company: James O'Connolly Productions (as Ello)
- Distributed by: J. Arthur Rank Film Distributors (UK)
- Release date: May 1962
- Running time: 71 minutes
- Country: United Kingdom
- Language: English

The Traitors is a 1962 British second feature thriller film directed by Robert Tronson and starring Patrick Allen, Jacqueline Ellis, Zena Walker and James Maxwell. It was written by J. Levy and Jim O'Connolly.

== Plot ==
A British agent and an American from NATO co-operate in an attempt to smash a communist spy ring. Following the discovery of a top secret microfilm after a plane crash, the two become embroiled in a complex web of treachery and double agents, before finally bringing the enemy spies to justice.

== Cast ==
- Patrick Allen as John Lane
- Jacqueline Ellis as Mary
- James Maxwell as Ray Ellis
- Zena Walker as Annette Lane
- Ewan Roberts as Colonel Burlinson
- Jeffrey Segal as Dr Lindt
- Anne Padwick as Mrs Lindt
- Harold Goodwin as Edwards
- John Bown as Mason
- Sean Lynch as Porter
- Jack May as Burton
- Anton Rodgers as Curtis
- Mark Singleton as Venner

== Critical reception ==
Kine Weekly wrote: "Taut, skilfully-carpentered espionage melodrama. ... The picture eschews subtelty, but what it lacks in finesse it gains in robustness."

Boxoffice wrote: "A minor British-made spy melodrama, completely lacking in marquee value, will satisfy undiscriminating moviegoers in supporting spot on neighborhood duals. ... The picture wastes little time on human interest details and, this coupled with the unfamiliar players, gives the film a documentary flavor."

Leslie Halliwell wrote: "Commendable second feature with narrative virtues absent in most big films."

Britmovie called the film a "decent second-feature espionage drama."
