= Eucalathis =

Scientific classification
- Domain: Eukaryota
- Kingdom: Animalia
- Phylum: Brachiopoda
- Class: Rhynchonellata
- Order: Terebratulida
- Family: Chlidonophoridae
- Genus: Eucalathis; Fischer & Oehlert, 1890

Genus of brachiopods

Eucalathis is a genus of brachiopods belonging to the family Chlidonophoridae.

The genus has almost cosmopolitan distribution.

Species:

- Eucalathis cubensis Cooper, 1977
- Eucalathis daphneae Bitner & Logan, 2016
- Eucalathis ergastica Fischer & Öhlert, 1890
- Eucalathis fasciculata Cooper, 1973
- Eucalathis floridensis Cooper, 1977
- Eucalathis inflata Cooper, 1973
- Eucalathis macrorhynchus Forster, 1974
- Eucalathis magna Cooper, 1981
- Eucalathis malgachensis Bitner & Logan, 2016
- Eucalathis methanophila Kaim et al., 2010
- Eucalathis murrayi (Davidson, 1878)
- Eucalathis rugosa Cooper, 1973
- Eucalathis trigona (Jeffreys, 1878)
- Eucalathis tuberata (Jeffreys, 1878)
