= New Towns for Old =

- Opening title
- Directed by: John Eldridge
- Written by: Dylan Thomas
- Produced by: Alexander Shaw
- Cinematography: Jo Jago
- Production companies: Strand Film Company; Ministry of Information (sponsor)
- Release date: 1942
- Running time: 7 minutes
- Country: United Kingdom
- Language: English

"New Towns for Old" is a 1942 British promotional short film promoting the clearance of old historic "slum towns" and replacement with "new towns". It promotes the then new concept of town planning. It was directed by John Eldridge and scripted by the poet Dylan Thomas. The film was produced by the Ministry of Information and was one of the few wartime documentaries to focus on a topic unrelated to the war.

The title alludes to a line from Aladdin: New Lamps for Old.

== Synopsis ==
Two civil servants wander around various vantage points looking at the fictional town of Smokedale. One with a bowler hat and carrying an umbrella has a refined London accent; the other in a trilby and smoking a pipe has a Yorkshire accent.

The footage itself is largely in and around Sheffield and Manchester and the civic functions discussed are in Manchester Town Hall. They proudly look at the new housing completed so far.

The film discusses true figures from the replanning of the Manchester slums from 1922 onward: 26,000 condemned; 14,000 demolished (plus "some help from Hitler"); 30,000 new houses planned. It stresses the need for a Green Belt around each town. Schools, hospitals and play areas are to be part of the plan. Old industries are discussed (and were in truth the hardest issue to address). The solution for relocating industries is not fully explained, and simply states that new areas will be zoned for industrial use - away from the housing.

It explains how war has delayed the plan.

It states "we've got to rebuild all our big towns".

The men then point to the camera and address the viewer, saying it is up to you. Remember it's your town.

== Later Recognition ==
The title was repeated in the 1962 guide to town planning "New Towns for Old" by J. B. Cullingworth.
