= Chlidonophora =

Scientific classification
- Domain: Eukaryota
- Kingdom: Animalia
- Phylum: Brachiopoda
- Class: Rhynchonellata
- Order: Terebratulida
- Family: Chlidonophoridae
- Genus: Chlidonophora; Dall, 1903

Genus of brachiopods

Chlidonophora is a genus of marine animals in the phylum Brachiopoda belonging to the family Chlidonophoridae.

The species of this genus are found in the Gulf of Mexico, Atlantic Ocean, eastern coast of the British Isles, western coast of Madagascar, south-east coast of Africa and in the Indian Ocean.

== Existence ==
There have been 155 occurrences of Chlidonophora as of November, 2022. The species of this genus have been found in the Gulf of Mexico, Atlantic Ocean, eastern coast of the British Isles, western coast of Madagascar, south-east coast of Africa and in the Indian Ocean.

== Characteristics ==
All species of Chidonophora are blind like all other species of Rhynconellata. They are stationery and attached to another surface like all other Brachiopods. They are filter feeders(also known as suspension feeders) and eat suspended food particles (usually phytoplankton). They have a taphonomy of low mg Calcite like all other Brachiopods.

== Subtaxa ==
Chlidonophora consists of 2 species, both of which are extant to the present day.

- Chlidonophora chuni (Blochmann, 1903)
- Chlidonophora incerta (Davidson, 1878)
