= Surugathyris =

Scientific classification
- Domain: Eukaryota
- Kingdom: Animalia
- Phylum: Brachiopoda
- Class: Rhynchonellata
- Order: Terebratulida
- Family: Cancellothyrididae
- Genus: Surugathyris; Yabe & Hatai, 1934
- Species: S. suragaensis

Binomial name
- Surugathyris suragaensis Yabe & Hatai, 1934

Genus of brachiopods

Surugathyris is a monotypic genus of brachiopods belonging to the family Cancellothyrididae. The only species is Surugathyris suragaensis.

The species is found in Japan.
