= Assignment: Underwater =

American adventure television series from 1960 to 1961

- Genre: Adventure
- Starring: Bill Williams; Diane Mountford
- Composers: Alec Compinsky; Richard LaSalle; Herman Stein
- Country of origin: United States
- Original language: English
- No. of seasons: 1
- No. of episodes: 39

Production
- Executive producer: Frank De Felitta
- Producers: Bernard Glasser; Philip Yordan
- Camera setup: Single-camera
- Running time: 25 mins.

Original release
- Network: Syndication (NTA Film Network)
- Release: September 9, 1960 – June 2, 1961

Assignment: Underwater is an American adventure television series which aired in NTA Film Network syndication from 1960 to 1961.

== Overview ==
The series stars prolific B-movie actor Bill Williams and Diane Mountford. Williams played Bill Greer, the skipper aboard a charter boat named The Lively Lady. Mountford played his daughter, Patty.

The series was written and produced by Frank De Felitta for Liberty Enterprises and National Telefilm Associates.

== Episodes ==
Nº	Title	Directed by	Written by	Original release date
1	"The Hot Chihuaha"	Gene Fowler Jr.	Story by : Mort Zarcoff; Teleplay by : Bill S. Ballinger	September 9, 1960
2	"Operation Betrayal"	Edward Bernds	Story by : Edward Bernds; Teleplay by : Peter Packer & Edward Bernds	September 16, 1960
3	"The Sea Cave"	Paul Landres	Edward Bernds	September 23, 1960
4	"Panic Off Punta Banda"	Elliot Silverstein	Mort Zarcoff	September 30, 1960
5	"The Gun"	Gene Fowler Jr.	Story by : Edward Bernds; Teleplay by : Louis Vittes	October 7, 1960
6	"The Coast Watcher"	Unknown	Edward Bernds	October 14, 1960
7	"Charlie Noble's Pearl"	Gene Fowler Jr.	Story by : Mort Zarcoff; Teleplay by : Tom Gries	October 21, 1960
8	"Dead-Log Pickup"	Unknown	Story by : Mort Zarcoff; Teleplay by : Milton S. Gelman	October 28, 1960
9	"Decoy"	Paul Landres	Edward Bernds	November 4, 1960
10	"A Matter of Honor"	Gene Fowler Jr.	Story by : Edward Bernds; Teleplay by : Malvin Wald	November 11, 1960
11	"The Portrait"	R.G. Springsteen	Story by : Mort Zarcoff; Teleplay by : Robert C. Dennis	November 18, 1960
12	"A Message to Mulligan"	Gene Fowler Jr.	Story by : Mort Zarcoff; Teleplay by : Robert Bassing	November 25, 1960
13	"Troubled Waters"	Unknown	Story by : Edward Bernds; Teleplay by : Vincent Fotre	December 2, 1960
14	"Tension Below"	Unknown	Story by : Mort Zarcoff; Teleplay by : Richard Landau	December 9, 1960
15	"A Drop in the Ocean"	Unknown	Story by : Mort Zarcoff; Teleplay by : Francis M. Cockrell	December 16, 1960
16	"The Medal"	Unknown	Lee Loeb	December 23, 1960
17	"Odd Man Dies"	Unknown	Story by : Edward Bernds; Teleplay by : Richard Landau & Vincent Fotre	December 30, 1960
18	"Nightmare Bay"	Unknown	Story by : Mort Zarcoff; Teleplay by : Bill S. Ballinger	January 6, 1961
19	"Affair in Tokyo"	Unknown	Richard Landau	January 13, 1961
20	"The Key"	Unknown	Story by : Edward Bernds; Teleplay by : Elwood Ullman	January 20, 1961
21	"The Dam"	Unknown	Herbert Purdom	January 27, 1961
22	"Boat Missing"	Unknown	Story by : Mort Zarcoff; Teleplay by : Arnold Belgard	February 3, 1961
23	"Killer Bait"	Unknown	Herbert Purdum	February 10, 1961
24	"Journey to Death"	Unknown	Frank De Felitta	February 17, 1961
25	"The Target"	Unknown	Edward Bernds	February 24, 1961
26	"Dead Weight"	Frank De Felitta	Story by : Frank De Felitta; Teleplay by : Francis M. Cockrell	March 3, 1961
27	"Ghost Dive"	Unknown	Milton S. Gelman	March 10, 1961
28	"Swamp Light"	Unknown	Wilton Schiller	March 17, 1961
29	"Ship Killer"	Unknown	Don Moore & Arthur Rowe	March 24, 1961
30	"Gold Fever"	Gene Fowler Jr.	Mort Zarcoff	March 31, 1961
31	"A Question of Degree"	Unknown	Story by : Mort Zarcoff; Teleplay by : Fred Freiberger	April 7, 1961
32	"Witness from the Dead"	Gene Fowler Jr.	Story by : Mort Zarcoff; Teleplay by : Denis Sanders	April 14, 1961
33	"Anchor Man"	Unknown	Tom Gries	April 21, 1961
34	"The Secret of the Reef"	Unknown	Irwin Blacker	April 28, 1961
35	"Rescue at Diamond Shoal"	Steve Sekely	Story by : Edward Bernds; Teleplay by : Elwood Ullman & Edward Bernds	May 5, 1961
36	"Ordeal at Forty Fathoms"	Unknown	Story by : Edward Bernds; Teleplay by : Bill S. Ballinger	May 12, 1961
37	"No Escape"	Gene Fowler Jr.	Robert Bellem	May 19, 1961
38	"Partners in Death"	Steve Sekely	Tom Gries	May 26, 1961
39	"The Deadly Game"	Unknown	Edward Bernds	June 2, 1961
