= Christine Norden =

British actress (1924–1988)

- Born: Mary Lydia Thornton; 28 December 1924; Sunderland, England
- Died: 21 September 1988 (aged 63); Isleworth, England
- Occupation: Actress
- Years active: 1939–1988
- Spouses: Norman Cole (m. 1944–1947) Jack Clayton (m. 1947–1953) Mitchell Dodge (m. 1953–1955) Herbert Hecht (m. 1956–1961) George Heselden (m. 1980)
- Children: 1

Christine Norden (born Mary Lydia Thornton; 28 December 1924 – 21 September 1988) was a British actress.

== Early life ==
Norden was born in Mowbray Terrace, Sunderland. She was the daughter of a bus driver. Her childhood home was in Hylton Road, Sunderland, and she was educated at Hylton Road Primary School and Havelock School. Her sister June Mitchell (1933–2009) was an actress.

== Career ==
Norden gained experience singing and dancing while performing in wartime ENSA concerts and variety shows as a teenager. One claim to fame was that she was the first entertainer to land on Normandy beaches after D-Day. At the age of 20 she was "discovered" in a cinema queue and given a screen test by Sir Alexander Korda. Her screen debut was as a nightclub singer in the 1947 film Night Beat. In an interview with the Sunderland Echo on 3 June 1952, she said: "Please don't refer to me as the girl who was discovered in a cinema queue. I'm so tired of that tag. You see, nobody believes it, and it aggravates me so much because it happens to be true." Her best-known appearances were in An Ideal Husband, Mine Own Executioner and the 1949 film Saints and Sinners. She won a British National Film Award in 1949 for the latter performance.

After appearing in ten films within five years, Norden left Britain for America in 1952, where she settled in New York and married her third husband, US Air Force sergeant Mitchell Dodge. She went on to become an American citizen in 1960, starring on Broadway in the musical Tenderloin at around the same time. She also caused a sensation in 1967, when she became the first actress to appear topless off Broadway, in the comedy Scuba Duba.

Norden returned to London in the 1970s to work on stage, screen, and television, but retained an apartment in New York and held several exhibitions of her paintings in Manhattan.

== Personal life ==
Norden married five times. Her first husband was bandleader Norman Cole, by whom she had a son, Michael. Her other husbands included British film director Jack Clayton and musician Herbert Hecht. Her 1977 biography, The Champagne Days Are Over, also detailed other romantic links.

== Death ==
She died in Middlesex, aged 63, from pneumonia following heart bypass surgery. (Note: Several online sources claim that in 1988, following her death, the United States Geological Survey named part of the planet Venus after her as a tribute to her reputation as Britain's first postwar sex symbol. However, to date, evidence for this claim is lacking, and no name on the planet shares any resemblance to the name(s) Christine Norden.) She was survived by her son, Michael Cole, and her widower, George Heselden, a retired mathematician who used to work for the Ministry of Defence.

== Filmography ==
Year	Title	Role	Notes
1947	An Ideal Husband	Mrs. Margaret Marchmont	
1947	Mine Own Executioner	Barbara Edge	
1947	Night Beat	Jackie	
1948	The Idol of Paris	Cora Pearl	
1949	Saints and Sinners	Blanche	
1949	The Interrupted Journey	Susan Wilding	
1949	A Case for PC 49	Della Dainton	
1951	The Black Widow	Christine Sherwin	
1951	Reluctant Heroes	Gloria Pennie	
