= Colin Morris (playwright) =

British playwright, screenwriter and actor (1916–1996)

Colin Morris (4 February 1916 – 31 March 1996) was a British playwright, screenwriter and actor. His best known work was the screen version of Reluctant Heroes (1952) based on his own hit play of the same title. As an actor, he appeared in the 1957 film The Silken Affair. Reluctant Heroes premiered in 1950 at the Whitehall Theatre, and was the first of the Brian Rix company's Whitehall farces.

Other plays of Morris's include:

- Desert Rats (1945)
- Woman at Large (English Theatre Guild, 1950)
- The Terrible Crime of Mr Bat (children's drama; Samuel French, 1950)
- Don't Bank On It
- Missing, Believed Married (English Theatre Guild, 1951)
- Italian Love Story (English Theatre Guild, 1955)
- This Marriage Business (English Theatre Guild, 1956)

Published screenplays include:

- Quiet Revolution (documentary drama)
