= Crack in the World =

1965 film by Andrew Marton

- 1965 theatrical release poster
- Directed by: Andrew Marton
- Screenplay by: Jon Manchip White; Julian Zimet
- Story by: Jon Manchip White
- Produced by: Bernard Glasser; Lester A. Sansom
- Starring: Dana Andrews; Janette Scott; Kieron Moore; Alexander Knox
- Cinematography: Manuel Berenguer
- Edited by: Derek Parsons
- Music by: Johnny Douglas
- Production company: Security Pictures
- Distributed by: Paramount Pictures
- Release date: February 24, 1965 (U.S.)
- Running time: 96 minutes
- Country: United States
- Language: English
- Budget: $875,000

Crack in the World is a 1965 American science-fiction disaster film directed by Andrew Marton and starring Dana Andrews, Janette Scott, Kieron Moore and Alexander Knox. It is about scientists who launch a nuclear missile into the Earth's crust, to release the geothermal energy of the magma below; but accidentally unleash a cataclysmic destruction that threatens to sever the earth in two.

== Plot ==
An international consortium of scientists, operating as Project Inner Space in Tanganyika, Africa, is trying to tap into the Earth's geothermal energy by drilling a very deep hole down to the planet's core. The scientists are foiled by an extremely dense layer of material. To penetrate the barrier and reach the magma below, they intend to detonate an atomic device at the bottom of the hole.

The leader of the project, Dr. Stephen Sorenson, who is secretly dying of cancer, believes that the atomic device will burn its way through the barrier, but the project's chief geologist, Dr. Ted Rampion, is convinced that the lower layers of the crust have been weakened by decades of underground nuclear tests, and that the detonation could produce a massive crack which would threaten the very existence of Earth.

The atomic device is used and Rampion's fears prove justified, as the crust of the Earth develops an enormous crack that progresses rapidly along a fault line, causing earthquakes and tsunamis along its path. Rampion warns a committee of world leaders that the crack is capable of extending beyond the fault, and that if it were to encircle the Earth, causing the land masses to split, the oceans would be sucked in, generating steam at high enough of a pressure to rip the Earth apart.

Sorenson meanwhile discovers that there was a huge reservoir of hydrogen underground, which turned the small conventional atomic explosion into a huge thermonuclear one that was millions of times more powerful. Another atomic device, lowered into the magma chamber of an island volcano in the path of the crack, is used in the hope of stopping the crack, but it only changes the crack's direction. Eventually, the crack approaches its starting point at the test site, and a huge chunk of the planet outlined by the crack is expected to be thrown out into space. Sorenson remains at the underground control center to record the event, despite pleas by his wife Maggie to evacuate with the rest of the project staff. She and Rampion barely escape the test site in time to observe the fiery birth of a second moon. Its release stops the crack, and the Earth survives.

== Cast ==
- Dana Andrews as Dr. Stephen Sorensen
- Janette Scott as Dr. Maggie Sorensen
- Kieron Moore as Dr. Ted Rampion
- Alexander Knox as Sir Charles Eggerston
- Peter Damon as John Masefield
- Jim Gillen as Rand
- Gary Lasdun as Markov
- Alfred Brown as Dr. Bill Evans
- John Karlsen as Dr. Reynolds
- Mike Steen as Steele
- Sydna Scott as Angela
- Todd Martin as Simpson

== Production ==
The film was produced by Security Pictures, a company founded by Philip Yordan, an expatriate American producer based in Europe. It was produced shortly after his adaptation of James Jones' The Thin Red Line, utilizing the same director, crew and locations.

Production took place in Spain to take advantage of lower production costs. Shooting took place in Madrid and the Canary Islands, and at Samuel Bronston Studios and CEA Studios. The "Central Operations" set was one of the largest enclosed sets constructed in Spain to date. Eugène Lourié was the film's art director and special effects director. Production lasted about seven weeks. The film's technical adviser was producer Glasser's neighbor, a geologist.

Screenwriter Julian Zimet was initially credited under the pseudonym 'Julian Halvey'. Zimet, who had been blacklisted during the previous decade, relocated to Europe and adopted the alias to continue his writing career, including several collaborations with Philip Yordan.

== Reception ==
Variety wrote that it was more believable than the usual science fiction premise and praised its special effects. Howard Thompson of The New York Times called it "the best science-fiction thriller this year". Time Out London called it "awesomely credible" and described the ending's imagery as disturbing.

== See also ==
- List of American films of 1965
- Dante's Peak
- The Core
