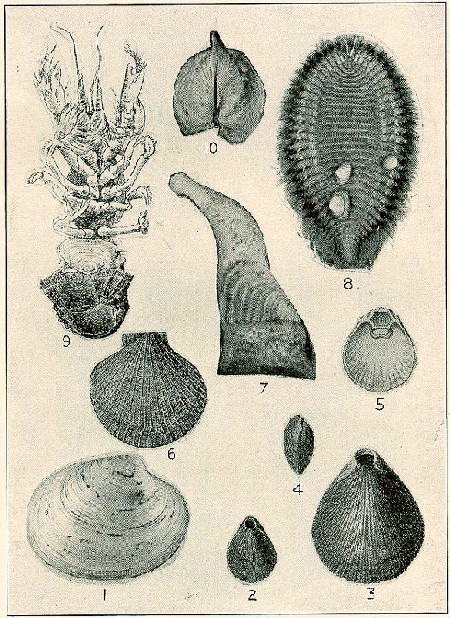
- Terebratulina unguicula

Scientific classification
- Domain: Eukaryota
- Kingdom: Animalia
- Phylum: Brachiopoda
- Class: Rhynchonellata
- Order: Terebratulida
- Family: Cancellothyrididae
- Genus: Terebratulina d'Orbigny, 1847

= Terebratulina =

Genus of brachiopods

Terebratulina is a genus of brachiopods belonging to the family Cancellothyrididae. The genus has a cosmopolitan distribution.

== Species ==
The following species are recognised in the genus Terebratulina:

- Terebratulina abyssicola (Adams & Reeve, 1850)
- Terebratulina akitana Nomura & Hatai, 1936
- Terebratulina alabamensis Cooper, 1988
- Terebratulina arabica Abbass, 1972
- Terebratulina ausroamericana Zezina, 1981
- Terebratulina australis Bitner, 2006
- Terebratulina austroamericana Zezina, 1981
- Terebratulina biauriculata d'Orbigny, 1847
- Terebratulina brundidgensis Aldrich, 1907
- Terebratulina buckmani Owen, 1980
- Terebratulina cailleti Crosse, 1865
- Terebratulina callinome Dall, 1920
- Terebratulina capillata Cooper, 1988
- Terebratulina carinata Von Hanstein, 1879
- Terebratulina cavata Verco, 1910
- Terebratulina christopheri Craig, 2001
- Terebratulina compressa Cooper, 1973
- Terebratulina crossei Davidson, 1882
- Terebratulina cumingi Davidson, 1852
- Terebratulina edwardsi Elliott, 1954
- Terebratulina eggeri Traub, 1938
- Terebratulina etheridgei Owen, 1988
- Terebratulina etigoensis Hatai, 1940
- Terebratulina flexuosa King, 1832
- Terebratulina gracilis (Schlotheim, 1813)
- Terebratulina hanawensis Hatai, 1939
- Terebratulina hashimotoi Hatai, 1936
- Terebratulina hataiana Cooper, 1973
- Terebratulina hawaiiensis Dall, 1920
- Terebratulina helenae Hatai, 1938
- Terebratulina honsyuensis Nomura & Hatai, 1936
- Terebratulina iduensis Hatai, 1936
- Terebratulina imbricata Owen, 1988
- Terebratulina indomita Crickmay, 1933
- Terebratulina japonica (Sowerby, 1846)
- Terebratulina kendricki Craig, 1999
- Terebratulina kiiensis Dall & Pilsbry, 1891
- Terebratulina kitakamiensis Hayasaka, 1938
- Terebratulina kurotakiensis Hatai, 1940
- Terebratulina kyusyuensis Yabe & Hatai, 1934
- Terebratulina latifrons Dall, 1920
- Terebratulina leeae MacFarlan, 2016
- Terebratulina longicollis Steinich, 1965
- Terebratulina louisianae Stenzel, 1940
- Terebratulina manchionealensis Harper & Donovan, 2007
- Terebratulina meridionalis Jackson, 1952
- Terebratulina miuraensis Hatai, 1940
- Terebratulina miurensis Hatai, 1940
- Terebratulina moniwaensis Hatai, 1936
- Terebratulina nodulosa Etheridge, 1881
- Terebratulina otutumiensis Hatai, 1940
- Terebratulina pacifica Yabe & Hatai, 1934
- Terebratulina palmeri Cooper, 1979
- Terebratulina peculiaris Hatai, 1940
- Terebratulina perplexa Cooper, 1957
- Terebratulina photina Dall, 1920
- Terebratulina protostriatula Owen, 1988
- Terebratulina putiensis MacFarlan, 2016
- Terebratulina radula Hedley, 1904
- Terebratulina reevei Dall, 1920
- Terebratulina retusa (Linnaeus, 1758)
- Terebratulina septentrionalis (Couthouy, 1838)
- Terebratulina shurugaensis Yabe & Hatai, 1934
- Terebratulina simosensis Hatai, 1940
- Terebratulina sirahamensis Hatai, 1940
- Terebratulina subcarinata Cooper, 1957
- Terebratulina subtilis Steinich, 1965
- Terebratulina tejonensis Stanton, 1896
- Terebratulina titibuensis Hatai, 1940
- Terebratulina tohokuensis Nomura & Hatai, 1936
- Terebratulina unguicula (Carpenter, 1864)
- Terebratulina valdiviae Blochmann, 1908
- Terebratulina wardenensis Elliott, 1938
- Terebratulina whiterockensis Hills, 1971
- Terebratulina wilsoni Cooper, 1988
- Terebratulina yabei Nomura & Hatai, 1936
