= Margaret Thomson =

Australian-born documentary filmmaker (1910–2005)

Margaret Thomson (10 June 1910 – 30 December 2005) was an Australian-born documentary filmmaker who divided her forty-year career between New Zealand and England. She was the first female film director active in New Zealand.

== Family and education ==
Margaret Thomson was born in Australia to Gertrude Thomson and James Allan Thomson, a geologist. He was appointed head of the Dominion Museum in Wellington, so Margaret spent most of her childhood in New Zealand. She attended Canterbury University, graduating with a degree in zoology.

== Film career ==
She moved to England in 1934. Her first film-related job in England was with Gaumont-British Instructional Films, for whom she worked initially as their film librarian and subsequently as editor for a series of films on the ecology of Great Britain. She left in 1938 and worked as a film editor elsewhere, eventually joining Realist Film Unit (RFU) in 1941. Partly due to the onset of World War II, which opened opportunities for women while men were at war, she worked on a large number of RFU film projects, many aimed at educating people about dealing with wartime conditions. She shot two postwar projects, Children Learning by Experience (1946) and Children Growing Up with Other People (1947), in a proto-cinéma vérité style in order to capture the children's behavior with as little interference as possible. She stayed at RFU for six years, developing a reputation as an outstanding director who conveyed complicated information clearly and without talking down to her audiences.

In 1947, she was offered a position as a director for New Zealand's National Film Unit (NFU), and she returned to the country where she had been raised. Her NFU short film Railway Worker (1948) is now considered a classic, and the NFU's head called it the best thing the NFU had produced up to that point in its history. One of the things that set the film apart from others of its era is that it showed the workers' home lives as well as their work lives. Thomson's own favorite among her NFU films was another short, The First Two Years at School (1949), which offered a close look at a school for Māori children.

Thomson eventually became unhappy over the amount of government oversight of the NFU, which she felt had the potential to stifle controversial material and limit the independence of viewpoints expressed by NFU films. She returned to England in 1950, taking up a job as director for the Crown Film Unit. Crown closed a year later, but she continued making films in England for another two decades as a freelance filmmaker and producer, mostly of documentary shorts. In the 1950s, she set up a production company with her husband, Bob Ash.

The only feature film Thomson directed was Child's Play (1954), a science-fiction film for Group 3 about children who managed to split the atom and thereby create a new form of popcorn. She coached child actors for other films, including The Kidnappers (1953), which won its two child stars juvenile Academy Awards.

Thomson retired from film making in 1977. She was the subject of a 1995 documentary, Direction... Margaret Thomson, and her work was featured in the documentary War, Peace and Pictures (1989).

== Filmography ==
Year	Title	Credit	Notes
1941	Cultivation	Direction	Documentary short
1942	Hedging	Direction	Documentary short
1942	Clamping Potatoes	Direction	Documentary short
1942	Making a Compost Heap	Direction	Documentary short
1943	Reseeding for Better Grass	Direction	Documentary short
1944	Clean Milk	Direction	Documentary short
1944	The Signs and Stages of Anaesthesia	Direction	Documentary short
1946	Children Learning by Experience	Direction	Documentary short
1947	Children Growing Up with Other People	Direction	Documentary short
1948	Railway Worker	Direction	Documentary short
1949	The First Two Years at School	Direction	Documentary short
1950	A Family Affair	Direction	Documentary short
1954	Child's Play	Direction	Feature film
1955	Friend of the Family	Direction and writing	Documentary short
1957	Yorkshire Imperial on Thames	Direction and writing	Documentary short
1960	Understanding Aggression	Direction and writing	Documentary short
1962	A Sense of Belonging	Direction and writing	Documentary short
1964	Frontier	Direction	Television documentary
