= Allan Thomson (geologist) =

New Zealand geologist

- Born: James Allan Thomson; 27 July 1881; Dunedin, New Zealand
- Died: 6 May 1928 (aged 46); Wellington, New Zealand
- Relatives: George Thomson (father) Margaret Thomson (daughter)

James Allan Thomson (27 July 1881 – 6 May 1928) was a New Zealand geologist, scientific administrator and museum director.

He was born in Dunedin, New Zealand, in 1881, where his father was a science teacher at Otago Boys' High School. He graduated from the University of Otago in 1904, the same year as Sir Peter Buck. Selected as New Zealand's first Rhodes Scholar, Thomson studied geology, played rugby, rowed and ran at St John's College, Oxford.

After doing geology in Australia, he was appointed palaeontologist with the New Zealand Geological Survey in 1911 and then succeeded Augustus Hamilton as director of the Dominion Museum (now Te Papa) in 1914.

He was accepted as a geologist on Robert Falcon Scott's Terra Nova Expedition to Antarctica, but he developed pulmonary tuberculosis and was forced to withdraw. The tuberculosis continued to trouble him and his health declined.

He was president of the Royal Society of New Zealand for a short time before his death in 1928; he was preceded by Bernard Cracroft Aston, who also stepped in after his death until the appointment of Clinton Coleridge Farr.

His father George Thomson was a New Zealand scientist, educationalist, social worker and politician. His daughter Margaret became a noted film director.

== Selected works ==
- Brachiopod morphology and genera: recent and tertiary Dominion Museum, 1927. Wellington New Zealand.
