= Janette Scott =

English actress (born 1938)

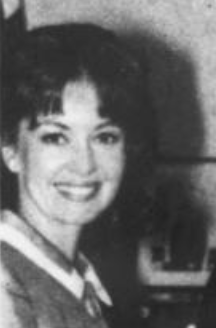
- Janette Scott, from a 1966 publication of the US State Department
- Born: Thora Janette Scott; 14 December 1938 (age 87); Morecambe, Lancashire, England
- Occupation: Actress
- Years active: 1942–1967, 1997
- Spouse(s): Jackie Rae (m. 1959; div. 1965) Mel Tormé (m. 1966; div. 1977) William Rademaekers (m. 1981; died 2018)
- Children: 2, including James Tormé
- Parent(s): James Scott; Thora Hird

Thora Janette Scott (born 14 December 1938) is a British retired actress.

== Life and career ==
Scott was born on 14 December 1938 in Morecambe, Lancashire, England. She is the daughter of actors Jimmy Scott and Thora Hird and began her career as a child actress known as Janette Scott. Scott was briefly (with Jennifer Gay) one of the so-called "Children's Announcers" providing continuity links for the BBC's children's TV programmes from the Lime Grove Studios in the early 1950s.

She became a popular leading lady, appearing as a daughter in As Long as They're Happy.

One of her best-known roles was April Smith in the film School for Scoundrels (1960), based on the "one-upmanship" books by Stephen Potter, in which Ian Carmichael and Terry-Thomas vie for her attention. Some scenes for School for Scoundrels were shot at a private members club before its current incarnation as a hotel. The hotel hosted a screening in 2016 with Janette Scott attending and answering questions about filming School for Scoundrels.

Scott's highest profile as a leading lady in British films was from the late 1950s to the mid-1960s, with more than a dozen leading roles during this period. She was the female lead opposite stars including Terry-Thomas, Ian Carmichael, Ronald Lewis, Ian Hendry and George Chakiris. She proved adept in genres including comedy, romantic drama, sci-fi thriller and period adventure. She gave up her career on marrying second husband, Mel Tormé.

She is known to American audiences for her role as the parson's wife in The Devil's Disciple (1959), starring Burt Lancaster, Kirk Douglas and Laurence Olivier.

She is named in the song "Science Fiction/Double Feature", the opening number of The Rocky Horror Show and its film version, The Rocky Horror Picture Show (performed over the opening credits), for her participation in the 1962 film The Day of the Triffids.

Scott wrote her autobiography Act One at the age of 14.

== Personal life ==
She has been married three times:

- Jackie Rae (27 June 1959 – 1965), divorced
- Mel Tormé (20 May 1966 – 1977), divorced; two children, including son James Tormé
- William Rademaekers (1981–2018), died

Between her marriages to Jackie Rae and Mel Tormé, she dated David Frost in the mid-1960s.

== Filmography ==
=== Film ===
Year	Title	Role	Notes
1942	Went the Day Well?	Child	
1943	The Lamp Still Burns		uncredited
1944	Two Thousand Women	Mrs. Burtshaw's Daughter on Mother's Lap	
1944	The Gay Intruders		
1949	Conspirator	Toby	uncredited
1950	No Place for Jennifer	Jennifer	
1951	The Galloping Major	Susan Hill	(with mother, Thora Hird)
1951	No Highway in the Sky	Elspeth Honey	
1951	The Magic Box	Ethel Friese-Greene	
1953	Background	Jess Lomax	AKA, Edge of Divorce
1955	As Long as They're Happy	Gwen Bentley	
1956	Helen of Troy	Cassandra	
1956	Now and Forever	Janette Grant	
1957	The Good Companions	Susie Dean	
1958	Happy Is the Bride	Janet Royd	
1959	The Lady Is a Square	Joanna Baring	
1959	The Devil's Disciple	Judith Anderson	
1960	School for Scoundrels	April Smith	
1961	His and Hers	Fran Blake	
1961	Double Bunk	Peggy	
1962	Two and Two Make Six	Irene	
1963	The Day of the Triffids	Karen Goodwin	
1963	Paranoiac	Eleanor Ashby	
1963	Siege of the Saxons	Katherine	
1963	The Old Dark House	Cecily Femm	
1964	The Beauty Jungle	Shirley Freeman	
1965	Crack in the World	Dr. Maggie Sorenson	
1967	Bikini Paradise	Rachel	

=== Television ===
Year	Title	Role	Notes
1954	The Dashing White Sergeant	Fione Cuningham	TV film
1957	Sunday Night Theatre	Judy	Episode: "The Girl at the Next Table"
1958	Armchair Theatre	Maeve McHugh	Episode: "A Man's Woman"
1960	BBC Sunday-Night Play	Kitty Tape	Episode: "20th Century Theatre: The Queen Came By"
1965	Burke's Law	Jennifer Robbins	Episode: "Password to Death"
1997	Last of the Summer Wine	Cameo	Episode: "There Goes the Groom"
