= John Eldridge (director) =

English film-maker (1917–1962)

John Eldridge (1917–1962) was a British film director.

Gaining fame as documentary film maker in the Second World War for the Ministry of Information his topics covered both war, and architecture and urban planning.

Often working with poets he had at least five collaborative projects with Dylan Thomas.

== Life ==
He was born in Folkestone on 26 July 1917.

Around 1950 he joined John Grierson's film company Group 3 Productions.

In addition to directing, he also wrote screenplays, most notably for Pool of London (1951) and Operation Amsterdam (1959).

Plagued by ill-health he died in Brompton Hospital in London on 14 June 1962.

== Works ==
- Sea Lights (1938) – co-directed with Martin Curtis
- Village School (1940) – documentary
- Story of Michael Flaherty (1940) – starring Morton King
- S.O.S. (1940) – documentary short
- War Front (1941) – story of a war correspondent on the front starring Bruce Belfrage
- Tank Patrol (1941) – short film about the crew of a Crusader tank trapped behind enemy lines in North Africa
- Architects of England (1941) – documentary narrated by Alvar Lidell
- Wales: Green Mountain, Black Mountain (1942) – documentary about historic conflicts between England and Wales scripted by Dylan Thomas
- Trinity House (1942) – docu-drama about British lighthouses starring John Snagge and Laidman Browne
- New Towns for Old (1942) – documentary about urban planning scripted by Dylan Thomas
- Fuel for Battle (1944) – documentary about military supplies scripted by Dylan Thomas
- Our Country (1944) – docu-drama scripted by Dylan Thomas and starring Burgess Meredith
- A Soldier Comes Home (1945) – story by Dylan Thomas of a soldier on leave with his family in London, explains why some men must remain in the army, even after the war. Music by Norman Fulton
- A City Reborn (1945) – documentary about the rebuilding of Coventry, scripted by Dylan Thomas
- Park Here (1947) – documentary about bad parking and the use of car parks, scripted by Laurie Lee
- North East Corner (1947) – documentary about fishing and farming in Aberdeenshire narrated by Laurie Lee
- Waverly Steps (1948) – docu-drama about a day in the life of people in Edinburgh
- Three Dawns to Sydney (1949)
- Brandy for the Parson (1952) – comedy based on a short story by Geoffrey Household
- Laxdale Hall (1953) – second "planning film" but feature length, about relocation of a town due to access problems
- Conflict of Wings (1954) – cinematography by Arthur Grant
