= Reluctant Heroes =

1952 film

- Australian daybill poster
- Directed by: Jack Raymond
- Written by: Colin Morris
- Based on: Reluctant Heroes by Colin Morris
- Produced by: Henry Halstead
- Starring: Ronald Shiner; Derek Farr; Christine Norden
- Cinematography: James Wilson
- Edited by: Helen Wiggins
- Music by: Tony Lowry
- Production company: Byron Films
- Distributed by: Associated British-Pathé
- Release date: 11 February 1952
- Running time: 80 minutes
- Country: United Kingdom
- Language: English
- Budget: £45,000

Reluctant Heroes is a 1952 British comedy film directed by Jack Raymond and starring Ronald Shiner, Derek Farr and Christine Norden. It was written by Colin Morris based on his 1950 popular farce of the same title. The play, which had its West End premiere at the Whitehall Theatre in September 1950, was the first of the Brian Rix company's Whitehall farces.

== Plot summary ==
This comedy is set in an army boot camp. It displays a drill sergeant who must somehow turn an inept group of recruits into real soldiers.

== Cast ==
- Ronald Shiner as Sergeant Bell
- Derek Farr as Michael Tone
- Christine Norden as Gloria Dennis
- Brian Rix as Horace Gregory
- Larry Noble as Trooper Morgan
- Betty Empey as Pat Thompson
- Angela Wheatland as Penny Roberts
- Anthony Baird as Sgt. McKenzie
- Colin Morris as Captain Percy
- Elspet Gray as Lieutenant Virginia

== Production ==
The film was shot at the Riverside Studios in Hammersmith in West London. Its sets were designed by the art director Wilfred Arnold.

== Reception ==
=== Box office ===
The film is listed in the 12 most popular films at the British box-office in 1952, in an article in the Sydney Sunday Herald that cited Ronald Shiner as the UK's favourite film star of the year. It earned ten times its budget.

Brian Rix asserts in his autobiography that it was the UK's top box office film of the year.

=== Critical ===
The Monthly Film Bulletin wrote: "This long-drawn-out farce is a re-hash of most of the familiar army jokes, only a few of which still remain funny. Ronald Shiner and Brian Rix work hard for laughs, but the material gets the better of them in the end."

Kine Weekly wrote: "Rollicking Army comedy. Adapted from the terrific Whitehall stage success, it centres on a tough vernacular sergeant, excellently played by Ronald Shiner, and draws hearty laughs from the reactions of rookies, representing different walks of life, to the tyrant's blustering and bullying. A slight, though appropriate, romantic interest establishes feminine appeal, while the skilfully contrived tit-for-tat climax is, as it should be, the biggest scream of all."

Picturegoer wrote: "While it follows the pattern set by countless Army burlesques dating from the first World War, the film is good for a kitbagful of laughs."

Picture Show wrote: "The team work of the cast is first-class, and the fun never flags, while Ronald Shiner as the sergeant is an entertainment in himself."
