= Chlidonophoridae =

Scientific classification
- Kingdom: Animalia
- Phylum: Brachiopoda
- Class: Rhynchonellata
- Order: Terebratulida
- Family: Chlidonophoridae; Muir-Wood, 1959

Subfamilies
- Chlidonophorinae; Draciinae; Agulhasinae; Eucalathinae; Orthothyridinae

Diversity
- 52 species

Family of brachiopods

Chlidonophoridae is a family of brachiopods belonging to the order Terebratulida.

== Existence ==
Fossils of Chlidonophoridae have been discovered as early as 191-183 MYA in the Jurassic period. her has a total of 52 species out of which 25 are extant to the present day (48%). There have been a total of 697 occurrences of the genus, most located in the Gulf of Mexico, North coast of Europe, West of Australia, East of Africa and South of South America.

== Charactersistics ==
All species of Chlidonophoridae are blind like all species of Rhynchonellata. They are stationary and are attached to a surface. They are suspension feeders also called filter feeders and their diet consists of suspended food particles like phytoplankton. They also have a taphonomy of low Mg calcite like all other brachiopods.

== Subtaxa ==
=== Subfamily Chlidonophorinae ===
- Chlidonophora
- Deslongchampsithyris
- Disculina
- Gisilina
- Meonia
- Prochlidonophora
- Rugia

=== Subfamily Draciinae ===
- Dracius

=== Subfamily Eucalathinae ===
- Eucalathis
- Notozyga

=== Subfamily Orthothyridinae ===
- Orthothyris

=== Subfamily Agulhasiinae ===
- Agulhasia

Phylogeny of Chlidonophoridae

- Other Taxa in Terebratulida
- Terebratulidina
  - Other Taxa
  - Cancellothyridoidea
    - Cancellothyrididae
    - Inopinatarculidae
    - Chlidonophoridae
