= Laxdale Hall =

1953 film by John Eldridge

- British quad poster by Lancaster
- Directed by: John Eldridge
- Written by: Alfred Shaughnessy; John Eldridge
- Based on: novel Laxdale Hall by Eric Linklater
- Produced by: Alfred Shaughnessy
- Starring: Ronald Squire; Kathleen Ryan; Raymond Huntley; Sebastian Shaw
- Cinematography: Arthur Grant; Ken Hodges
- Edited by: Bernard Gribble
- Music by: Frank Spencer
- Production company: Group 3 Films
- Distributed by: Associated British-Pathé (UK)
- Release dates: April 1953 (UK); 5 June 1954 (USA)
- Running time: 77 minutes
- Country: United Kingdom
- Language: English

Laxdale Hall (also known as Poacher Story and The Road to Nowhere; U.S. title: Scotch on the Rocks) is a 1953 British romantic comedy film directed by John Eldridge and starring Ronald Squire, Kathleen Ryan, Raymond Huntley and Sebastian Shaw, with Prunella Scales and Fulton Mackay in early roles. It was adapted by Alfred Shaughnessy and Eldridge from the 1951 novel Laxdale Hall by Eric Linklater.

The people of a small Scottish community refuse to pay their road tax until the government repairs their road. The story touches upon the British town planning system – mocking the New Towns Act 1946 (9 & 10 Geo. 6. c. 68).

== Plot ==
The few car owners of Laxdale, a remote village near the Isle of Skye at Applecross, refuse to pay their Road Fund taxes, in protest against the poor state of the only road to the village. A series of summonses, sent out via the local police, mysteriously disappear. The government sends a delegation to investigate. It is led by Samuel Pettigrew, a pompous politician and industrialist, whose mother was born in Laxdale. He is accompanied by another MP, Hugh Marvell, and Andrew Flett from the Scottish Office.

Pettigrew presents plans to abandon the village and set up a New Town, Brumley Dumps, 100 miles away. But the villagers are unimpressed.

Flett, a former teacher, begins romancing the local schoolteacher. Marvell spends his time with the daughter of the laird, a retired general.

The villagers see everything differently. In the middle of torrential rain, the local poacher chats casually with the undertaker saying "och, there's a bit of mist on the hill". The hearse is used to transport his poached stag. Later, in the pouring rain, they hold an open-air production of Macbeth. The play is abandoned when news arrives that there are poachers from Glasgow on the estate (only local poachers are tolerated). They ambush the poachers and the police arrest them.

By the time the delegation is ready to leave, Pettigrew has accepted the viewpoint of the villagers; they must have a new road.

== Cast ==
- Ronald Squire as General Matheson
- Kathleen Ryan as Catriona Matheson
- Raymond Huntley as Samuel Pettigrew, M.P.
- Sebastian Shaw as Hugh Marvell, M.P.
- Fulton Mackay as Andrew Flett of the Scottish Office
- Jean Colin as Lucy Pettigrew
- Jameson Clark as Roderick McLeod the local poacher
- Grace Gavin as Mrs. McLeod
- Keith Faulkner as Peter McLeod
- Prunella Scales as Morag McLeod
- Kynaston Reeves as Reverend Ian Macaulay
- Andrew Keir as McKellaig
- Nell Ballantyne as Nurse Connachy
- Roddy McMillan as Willie John Watt
- Rikki Fulton as first poacher
- Eric Woodburn as Gamlie, leader of the poachers
- Archie Duncan as Police Sergeant at Kyle of Lochalsh
- Ian MacNaughton as police constable
- Howard Connell as the postman

== Production ==
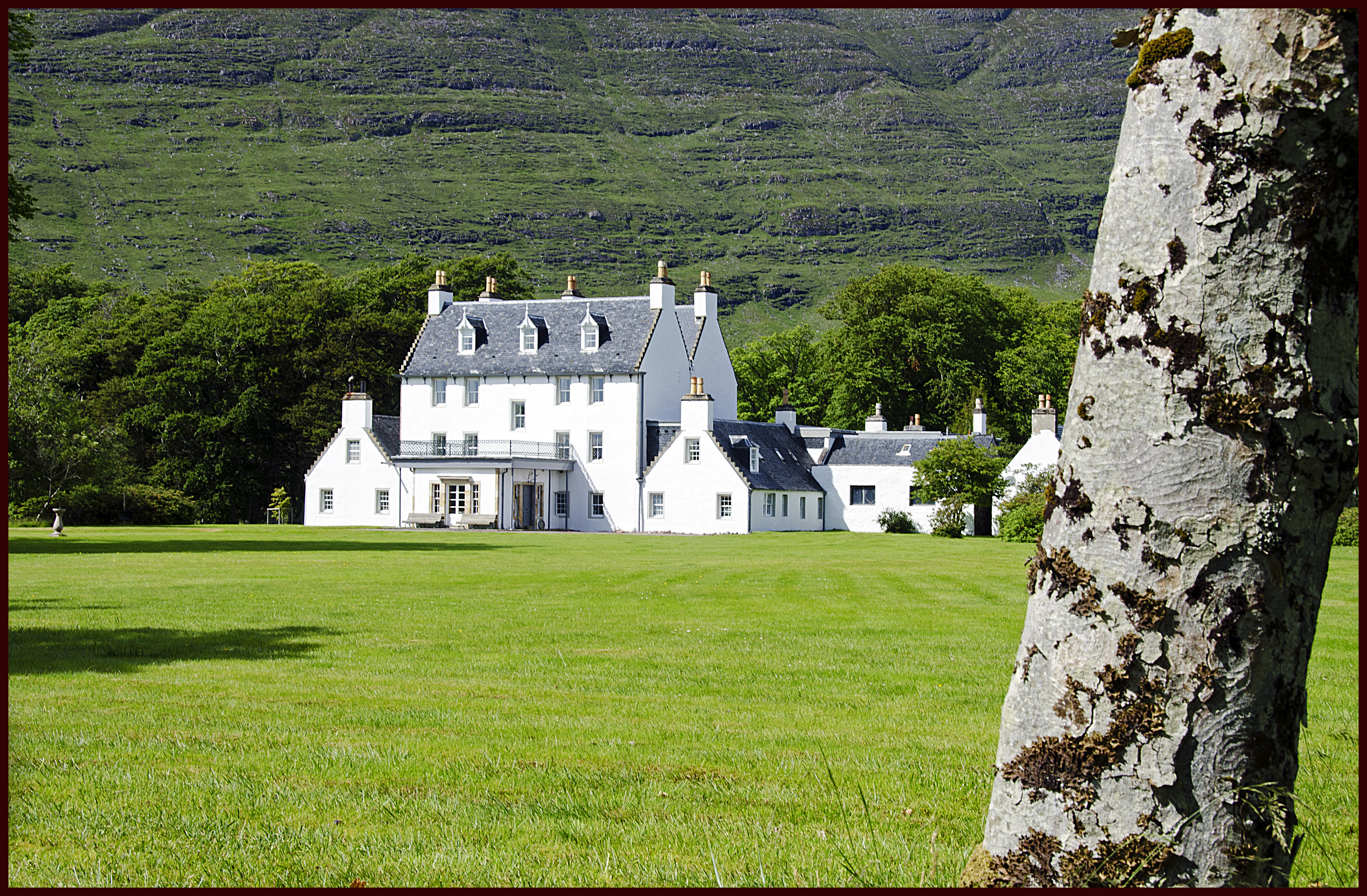
Applecross House

The external scenes were shot in Applecross, and "Laxdale Hall" is Applecross House, an early 18th-century laird's house of formal composition.

== Critical reception ==
The Monthly Film Bulletin wrote: "In its reliance on the attractions of landscape (not, in this case, particularly well photographed) and of mild law-breaking – poaching instead of smuggling – the picture greatly resembles John Eidridge's earlier work for Group 3, Brandy for the Parson. But the new film is a good deal more diffuse and less spirited than is predecessor, and the handling lacks pace and any real flair for comedy. The more experienced players, notably Ronald Squire and Kynaston Reeves, make the most of such occasional moments of wit as the dialogue affords. On the whole, though, the film makes an indifferent, rather amateurish-looking, addition to a screen genre which has, in any case, been over-worked during the past few years."

Kine Weekly wrote: "The picture is not flattering to the Scottish climate, but at least the rain and the wind contribute to good atmosphere. The story is a trifle pat, but the players ... make the most of their chances and extract laughs from the foibles of politicians, local bigwigs, the clergy and poaches without treading on anybody's corns."

Leslie Halliwell said: "Thin rehash of Whisky Galore put together without the Ealing style. Minor compensations can be found."

The Radio Times wrote, "The huge success of director Alexander Mackendrick's Whisky Galore! meant it was inevitable that film-makers would cast around for more stories of wily Scots running rings around the stiff-necked English. However, lightning didn't strike twice and this tale of the battle between Whitehall and a tiny Hebridean island, whose inhabitants won't pay a hated road tax, lacks the magic sparkle of Mackendrick's classic."

In British Sound Films: The Studio Years 1928–1959 David Quinlan rated the film as "average", writing: "Charming, though not consistently funny addition to a then-familiar genre."

TV Guide wrote, "The humor is subtle and gentle, but often very funny, in much the same way as that in Bill Forsyth's pictures (Local Hero, Comfort and Joy) three decades later."
