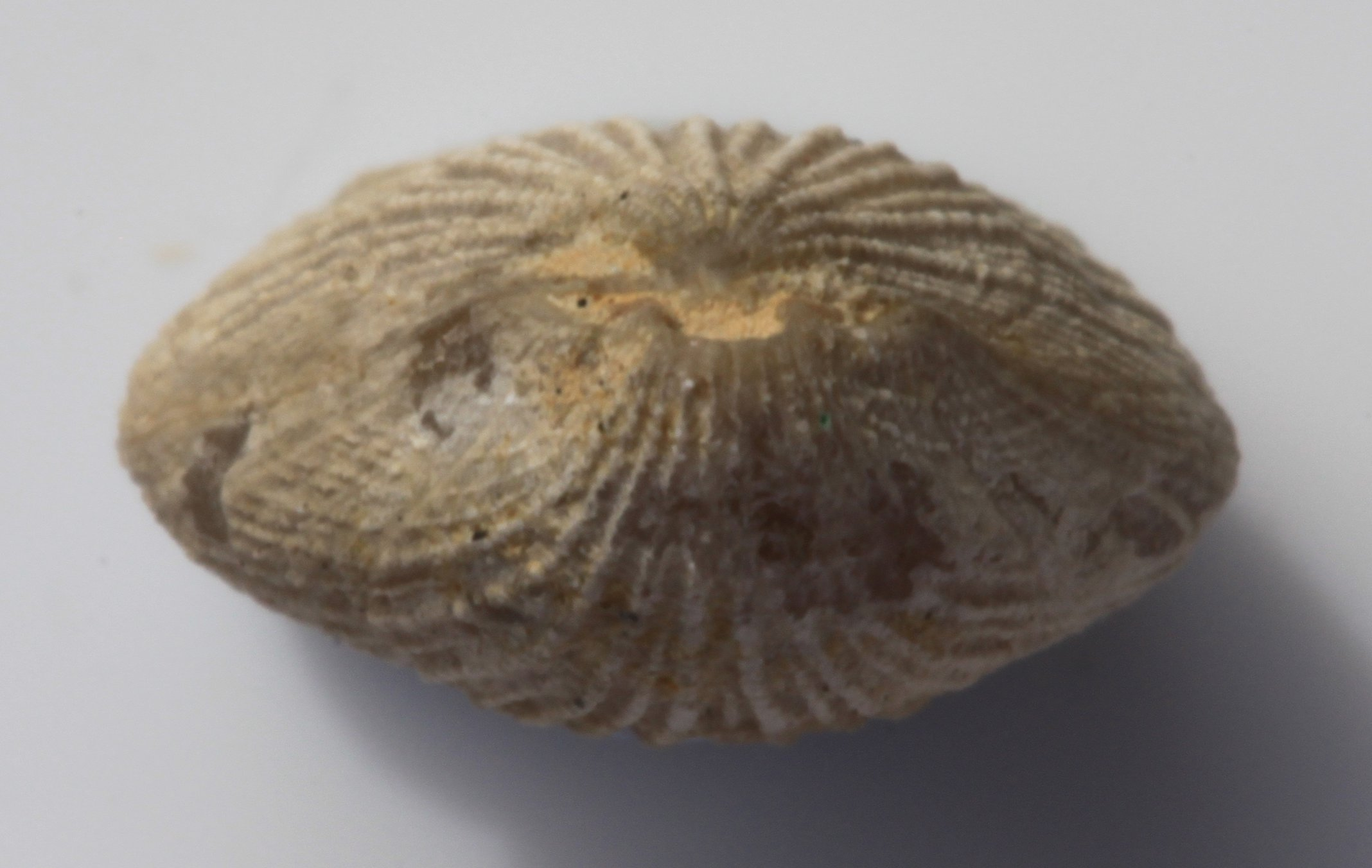
- Terebratulina hinge

Scientific classification
- Domain: Eukaryota
- Kingdom: Animalia
- Phylum: Brachiopoda
- Class: Rhynchonellata
- Order: Terebratulida
- Family: Cancellothyrididae; Thomson, 1926

= Cancellothyrididae =

Family of brachiopods

Cancellothyrididae is a family of brachiopods belonging to the order Terebratulida. It was first described by James Allan Thomson in 1926.

== Genera ==
Accepted genera by IRMNG:

- †Alithyris Sun, 1981
- †Bisulcina Titova, 1977
- Cancellothyris Thomson, 1926
- Cooperithyris Tchorszhevsky, 1988 †
- Cricosia Cooper, 1973 †
- Cruralina Smirnova, 1966 †
- Gyrosoria Cooper, 1973 †
- Murravia Thomson, 1916
- Ortholina Calzada, 1984 †
- Praeterebratulina Ischenko, 2004 †
- Rhynchonellopsis Vincent, 1893 †
- Sendaithyris Hatai, 1940 †
- Surugathyris Yabe & Hatai, 1934
- Symphythyris Smirnova, 1966 †
- Terebratulina d'Orbigny, 1847
- Trochifera Ching & Ye in Ye & Yang, 1979 †
