= Larry Noble (actor) =

British actor (1914–1993)

Larry Noble (born 13 December 1914) was a Lebanese-born British stage comedian and actor best known for starring in the Whitehall farces with Brian Rix. He starred in the original production of Reluctant Heroes and as the chirpy French jockey in Dry Rot. On television, he made guest appearances in Last of the Summer Wine in 1975 and Blake's 7 in 1981. He died on 9 September 1993, aged 78.

== Selected filmography ==
- Not Wanted on Voyage (1957)
