= List of Italian films of 1948 =

A list of films produced in Italy in 1948 (see 1948 in film):

== A-L ==
Title	Director	Cast	Genre	Notes
Accidenti alla guerra!...	Giorgio Simonelli	Nino Taranto, Louis Rossi		
El Alarido				
L'Amore	Roberto Rossellini	Anna Magnani, Federico Fellini, Amelia Robert	Drama	
Assunta Spina	Mario Mattoli	Anna Magnani, Antonio Centa, Eduardo De Filippo	Drama	
Be Seeing You, Father	Camillo Mastrocinque	Gino Bechi, Mariella Lotti, Silvana Pampanini	Comedy	
Bicycle Thieves	Vittorio De Sica	Lamberto Maggiorani, Enzo Staiola, Lianella Carell	Italian neorealism	Best Foreign Language Film Academy Award winners, BAFTA winner
Cab Number 13	Mario Mattoli	Vera Carmi, Ginette Leclerc, Sandro Ruffini	Historical drama	Co-production with France
Call of the Blood	Ladislao Vajda	John Clements, Kay Hammond, Carlo Ninchi	Drama	Co-production with Britain
City of Pain	Mario Bonnard	Luigi Tosi, Constance Dowling, Gianni Rizzo	Drama	
The Charterhouse of Parma	Christian-Jaque	Renée Faure, Gérard Philipe, María Casares	Historical	Co-production with France
Crossroads of Passion	Ettore Giannini, Henri Calef	Viviane Romance, Clément Duhour, Valentina Cortese	Drama	Co-production with France
The Dance of Death	Marcel Cravenne	Erich von Stroheim, Denise Vernac, María Denis	Drama	Co-production with France
...E non dirsi addio!	Silvio Laurenti Rosa	Gabriella Ferri, Sergio Bergone		
Eleven Men and a Ball	Giorgio Simonelli	Carlo Dapporto, Carlo Campanini, Clelia Matania	Sports	
Escape to France	Mario Soldati	Pietro Germi, Folco Lulli, Enrico Olivieri	Italian neorealism	
Fabiola	Alessandro Blasetti	Michèle Morgan, Henri Vidal, Michel Simon, Massimo Girotti, Paolo Stoppa	Sword and sandal	
Fear and Sand	Mario Mattoli	Totò, Isa Barzizza, Mario Castellani	Comedy	
Germany Year Zero	Roberto Rossellini	Edmund Moeschke, Ernst Pittschau, Franz-Otto Krüger	Italian neorealism	Filmed in Berlin; German language
Guarany	Riccardo Freda	António Vilar, Mariella Lotti, Gianna Maria Canale	Historical	
Heart	Vittorio De Sica, Duilio Coletti	Vittorio De Sica, María Mercader, Giorgio De Lullo	Drama	
The Howl	Ferruccio Cerio	Elli Parvo, Roldano Lupi, Rafael Bardem	Mystery	Co-production with Spain
Immigrants	Aldo Fabrizi	Aldo Fabrizi, Ave Ninchi, Loredana Padoan	Drama	

== M-Z ==
Title	Director	Cast	Genre	Notes
Mad About Opera	Mario Costa	Gina Lollobrigida, Constance Dowling, Carlo Campanini	Musical comedy	
The Man with the Grey Glove	Camillo Mastrocinque	Annette Bach, Roldano Lupi, Antonio Centa	Mystery	
Prelude to Madness	Gianni Franciolini	Clara Calamai, Roldano Lupi, Jean Servais	Drama	
Proibito rubare	Luigi Comencini	Adolfo Celi, Luigi Demastro, Tina Pica	Italian neorealism	Close to Father Flanagan and his Boys Town (1938 film)
The Revenge of Baccarat	Jacques de Baroncelli	Pierre Brasseur, Sophie Desmarets, Robert Arnoux	Thriller	Co-production with France
Rocambole	Jacques de Baroncelli	Pierre Brasseur, Sophie Desmarets, Robert Arnoux	Thriller	Co-production with France
Ruy Blas	Pierre Billon	Danielle Darrieux, Jean Marais, Marcel Herrand	Historical	Co-production with France
La terra trema	Luchino Visconti	Antonio Arcidiacono, Maria Micale, Sebastiano Valastro	Italian neorealism	Venice Film Festival award
Toto Tours Italy	Mario Mattoli	Totò, Isa Barzizza, Giuditta Rissone, Fulvia Franco	Comedy	
Tragic Hunt	Giuseppe de Santis	Vivi Gioi, Massimo Girotti, Carla Del Poggio, Andrea Checchi	Italian neorealism	2 Nastro d'Argento
Under the Sun of Rome	Renato Castellani	Oscar Blando, Liliana Mancini, Francesco Golisano	Italian neorealism	Special Nastro d'Argento. Venice Award
Without Pity	Alberto Lattuada	Carla Del Poggio, John Kitzmiller, Giulietta Masina	Italian neorealism	Nastro d'Argento best supporting actress (Masina)
