= 1948 in film =

The year 1948 in film involved some significant events.

== Top-grossing films (U.S.) ==
The top ten 1948 released films by box office gross in North America are as follows:

Highest-grossing films of 1948
Rank	Title	Distributor	Domestic rentals
1	The Red Shoes	General Film	$5,000,000
2	Red River	United Artists	$4,506,825
3	The Paleface	Paramount	$4,500,000
4	Johnny Belinda	Warner Bros.	$4,266,000
5	Easter Parade	MGM	$4,144,000
6	The Three Musketeers	MGM	$4,124,000
7	The Snake Pit	20th Century Fox	$4,100,000
8	The Emperor Waltz	Paramount	$4,000,000
9	Homecoming	MGM	$3,699,000
10	Sitting Pretty	20th Century Fox	$3,550,000

== Events ==
- May 3 – The Supreme Court of the United States decide in United States v. Paramount Pictures, Inc. holding that the practice of block booking and ownership of theater chains by film studios constituted anti-competitive and monopolistic trade practices.
- Laurence Olivier's Hamlet becomes the first British film to win the American Academy Award for Best Picture.

== Awards ==
Category/Organization	6th Golden Globe Awards March 16, 1949	21st Academy Awards March 24, 1949
Best Film	Johnny Belinda; The Treasure of the Sierra Madre	Hamlet
Best Director	John Huston; The Treasure of the Sierra Madre	
Best Actor	Laurence Olivier; Hamlet	
Best Actress	Jane Wyman; Johnny Belinda	
Best Supporting Actor	Walter Huston; The Treasure of the Sierra Madre	
Best Supporting Actress	Ellen Corby; I Remember Mama	Claire Trevor; Key Largo
Best Screenplay, Adapted	Richard Schweizer; The Search	John Huston; The Treasure of the Sierra Madre
Best Screenplay, Original	Richard Schweizer; The Search	Richard Schweizer; The Search
Best Foreign Language Film	Hamlet	Monsieur Vincent

== Top ten money making stars ==
Rank	Actor/Actress
1.	Bing Crosby
2.	Betty Grable
3. (tie)	Bud Abbott; Lou Costello
4.	Gary Cooper
5.	Bob Hope
6.	Humphrey Bogart
7.	Clark Gable
8.	Cary Grant
9.	Spencer Tracy
10.	Ingrid Bergman

== Notable films released in 1948 ==
United States unless stated

=== # ===
- 3 Godfathers, directed by John Ford, starring John Wayne

=== A ===
- Abbott and Costello Meet Frankenstein, starring Bud Abbott and Lou Costello
- Act of Violence, starring Van Heflin, Robert Ryan, Janet Leigh
- Adventures of Don Juan, starring Errol Flynn
- Albuquerque, starring Randolph Scott and Barbara Britton
- The Amazing Mr. X, starring Turhan Bey and Lynn Bari
- L'Amore, directed by Roberto Rossellini, starring Anna Magnani – (Italy)
- Anna Karenina, starring Vivien Leigh and Ralph Richardson – (GB)
- Another Part of the Forest, starring Fredric March
- April Showers, starring Ann Sothern and Jack Carson
- Arch of Triumph, starring Ingrid Bergman, Charles Boyer, Charles Laughton, Ruth Warrick

=== B ===
- B.F.'s Daughter, starring Barbara Stanwyck
- Berlin Express, directed by Jacques Tourneur, starring Merle Oberon and Robert Ryan
- The Berliner (Berlin Balade), starring Gert Fröbe – (Germany)
- Bicycle Thieves (Ladri di biciclette), directed by Vittorio De Sica – (Italy)
- The Big Clock, starring Ray Milland, Charles Laughton, Elsa Lanchester, Maureen O'Sullivan
- Blanche Fury, starring Valerie Hobson and Stewart Granger – (GB)
- Blonde Ice, starring Leslie Brooks
- Blood on the Moon, starring Robert Mitchum
- Bodyguard, starring Lawrence Tierney and Priscilla Lane
- The Boy with Green Hair, directed by Joseph Losey, starring Dean Stockwell and Robert Ryan
- The Bride Goes Wild, directed by Norman Taurog, starring June Allyson and Van Johnson
- Brighton Rock, a Boulting Brothers film, starring Richard Attenborough – (GB)

=== C ===
- Call Northside 777, starring James Stewart
- La calle sin sol (The Sunless Street) – (Spain)
- Campus Honeymoon, starring Lee and Lyn Wilde
- Canon City, starring Scott Brady
- Command Decision, starring Clark Gable
- Counterblast, directed by Paul L. Stein, starring Mervyn Johns – (GB)
- Cry of the City, starring Victor Mature and Richard Conte

=== D ===
- The Dark Past, starring William Holden, Lee J. Cobb, Nina Foch
- A Date with Judy, starring Wallace Beery, Jane Powell, Elizabeth Taylor and Carmen Miranda
- Dédée d'Anvers, starring Simone Signoret – (France)
- Drunken Angel (Yoidore tenshi), directed by Akira Kurosawa, starring Takashi Shimura and Toshiro Mifune – (Japan)

=== E ===
- The Eagle with Two Heads (L'Aigle à deux têtes), directed by Jean Cocteau – (France)
- Easter Parade, starring Judy Garland, Fred Astaire and Peter Lawford
- The Emperor Waltz, starring Bing Crosby
- Escape, directed by Joseph L. Mankiewicz, starring Rex Harrison – (GB/U.S.)
- Eva – (Sweden)
- Every Girl Should Be Married, starring Cary Grant

=== F ===
- The Fallen Idol, written by Graham Greene and directed by Carol Reed, starring Ralph Richardson – (GB)
- Fighter Squadron, directed by Raoul Walsh, starring Edmond O'Brien and Robert Stack
- Force of Evil, starring John Garfield
- A Foreign Affair, directed by Billy Wilder, starring Jean Arthur and Marlene Dietrich
- Fort Apache, directed by John Ford and starring John Wayne, Henry Fonda, Shirley Temple
- Four Faces West, starring Joel McCrea and Frances Dee

=== G ===
- Germany Year Zero (Germania anno zero), directed by Roberto Rossellini – (Italy)
- God Reward You (Dios se lo pague), starring Arturo de Córdova – (Argentina)
- Good Sam, directed by Leo McCarey, starring Gary Cooper
- Good-Time Girl, starring Jean Kent and Dennis Price – (GB)
- Green Grass of Wyoming, starring Peggy Cummins and Charles Coburn
- The Green Promise, starring Marguerite Chapman and Walter Brennan
- The Guinea Pig, a Boulting Brothers film starring Richard Attenborough – (GB)

=== H ===
- Half Past Midnight, starring Kent Taylor and Peggy Knudsen
- Hamlet, directed by and starring Laurence Olivier, with Basil Sydney and Jean Simmons – (GB)
- He Walked by Night, starring Richard Basehart and Jack Webb
- A Hen in the Wind (Kaze no naka no mendori), directed by Yasujirō Ozu – (Japan)
- Hollow Triumph, starring Paul Henreid and Joan Bennett
- Homecoming, starring Clark Gable, Lana Turner, Anne Baxter, John Hodiak

=== I ===
- I Remember Mama, directed by George Stevens, starring Irene Dunne
- I Walk Alone, starring Burt Lancaster and Kirk Douglas
- The Iron Curtain, directed by William Wellman, starring Gene Tierney, Dana Andrews, June Havoc
- Isn't It Romantic?, starring Veronica Lake

=== J ===
- Joan of Arc, starring Ingrid Bergman
- Johnny Belinda, starring Jane Wyman and Lew Ayres
- Julia Misbehaves starring Greer Garson, Walter Pidgeon, Peter Lawford and Elizabeth Taylor
- June Bride, starring Bette Davis

=== K ===
- Key Largo, directed by John Huston, starring Humphrey Bogart, Edward G. Robinson, Lauren Bacall, Lionel Barrymore, Claire Trevor
- Kiss the Blood off My Hands, starring Joan Fontaine and Burt Lancaster
- The Kissing Bandit, starring Kathryn Grayson and Frank Sinatra
- Krakatit, directed by Otakar Vávra (Czechoslovakia)

=== L ===
- La Terra Trema, directed by Luchino Visconti (Italy)
- Ladies of the Chorus, starring Marilyn Monroe
- Lal Dupatta, starring Madhubala (India)
- The Lame Devil (Le Diable boiteux), directed by and starring Sacha Guitry – (France)
- Letter from an Unknown Woman, directed by Max Ophüls, starring Joan Fontaine and Louis Jourdan
- London Belongs to Me, starring Richard Attenborough and Alastair Sim – (GB)
- Louisiana Story, documentary by Robert J. Flaherty
- The Loves of Carmen, starring Rita Hayworth
- The Luck of the Irish, starring Tyrone Power and Anne Baxter
- Luxury Liner, starring Jane Powell and George Brent

=== M ===
- Macbeth, directed by and starring Orson Welles
- The Mating of Millie, starring Evelyn Keyes and Glenn Ford
- Mela, starring Dilip Kumar – (India)
- Melody Time, starring Roy Rogers & Trigger and The Andrews Sisters
- Mexican Hayride, starring Bud Abbott and Lou Costello
- Michurin, directed by Alexander Dovzhenko – (U.S.S.R.)
- Miranda, directed by Ken Annakin, starring Glynis Johns – (GB)
- Miss Tatlock's Millions, starring Wanda Hendrix, Barry Fitzgerald, John Lund
- The Monkey's Paw, starring Milton Rosmer – (GB)
- Moonrise, directed by Frank Borzage, starring Gail Russell and Dane Clark
- Morituri – (Germany)
- Mr. Blandings Builds His Dream House, starring Cary Grant and Myrna Loy
- My Dear Secretary, starring Kirk Douglas, Laraine Day
- Myriad of Lights (Wanjia denghuo) – (China)
- The Mysterious Apartment (Den hemmelighetsfulle leiligheten) – (Norway)

=== N ===
- The Naked City, directed by Jules Dassin, starring Barry Fitzgerald
- Night Has a Thousand Eyes, starring Edward G. Robinson
- No Orchids for Miss Blandish – (GB)
- No Room at the Inn, starring Freda Jackson and Hermione Baddeley – (GB)
- Noose, starring Carole Landis
- The Noose Hangs High, starring Bud Abbott and Lou Costello
- Nosotros los Pobres (We the Poor), starring Pedro Infante – (Mexico)

=== O ===
- On an Island with You starring Esther Williams, Peter Lawford, Ricardo Montalbán, Cyd Charisse, and Jimmy Durante
- One Sunday Afternoon, starring Dennis Morgan
- One Touch of Venus, starring Robert Walker and Ava Gardner
- Oliver Twist, directed by David Lean, starring Alec Guinness and Robert Newton – (GB)
- On Our Own Land (Na svoji zemlji) – (Yugoslavia)

=== P ===
- The Paleface, starring Bob Hope and Jane Russell
- Les Parents terribles, directed by Jean Cocteau, starring Jean Marais – (France)
- The Pirate, starring Gene Kelly and Judy Garland
- Pitfall, starring Dick Powell, Lizabeth Scott, Jane Wyatt, Raymond Burr
- Port of Call (Hamnstad), directed by Ingmar Bergman – (Sweden)
- Portrait of Jennie, directed by William Dieterle, starring Jennifer Jones and Joseph Cotten

=== Q ===
- Quartet, starring Mai Zetterling – (GB)

=== R ===
- Race Street, starring George Raft and William Bendix
- Rachel and the Stranger, starring Loretta Young, William Holden, Robert Mitchum
- Raw Deal, directed by Anthony Mann, starring Dennis O'Keefe, Claire Trevor, Marsha Hunt, Raymond Burr
- Red River, directed by Howard Hawks, starring John Wayne, Montgomery Clift, Walter Brennan, Joanne Dru, John Ireland
- The Red Shoes, directed by Michael Powell and Emeric Pressburger, starring Moira Shearer and Anton Walbrook – (GB)
- Relentless, starring Robert Young
- The Return of October, starring Glenn Ford
- Road House, starring Ida Lupino
- Rogues' Regiment, directed by Robert Florey and starring Dick Powell, Märta Torén, Vincent Price
- Romance on the High Seas, starring Jack Carson, Janis Paige, Doris Day (film debut)
- Rope, directed by Alfred Hitchcock, starring James Stewart
- Ruthless, starring Zachary Scott and Diana Lynn

=== S ===
- Saigon, the final of 4 films starring Alan Ladd and Veronica Lake
- The Sainted Sisters, starring Veronica Lake and Joan Caulfield
- Saraband for Dead Lovers, starring Stewart Granger and Joan Greenwood – (GB)
- Scott of the Antarctic, starring John Mills – (GB)
- Sealed Verdict, starring Ray Milland
- The Search, directed by Fred Zinnemann, starring Montgomery Clift – (US/Switzerland)
- Secret Beyond the Door, directed by Fritz Lang, starring Joan Bennett and Michael Redgrave
- Senza pietà (Without Pity) – (Italy)
- Shaheed, starring Dilip Kumar – (India)
- Silver River, starring Errol Flynn and Ann Sheridan
- Sitting Pretty, starring Robert Young and Maureen O'Hara
- Sleep, My Love, starring Claudette Colbert
- Sleeping Car to Trieste, starring Jean Kent – (GB)
- Smart Girls Don't Talk, starring Virginia Mayo
- The Snake Pit, starring Olivia de Havilland
- So Evil My Love, starring Ray Milland, Ann Todd, Geraldine Fitzgerald – (GB)
- A Song Is Born, starring Danny Kaye
- Sorry, Wrong Number, starring Barbara Stanwyck and Burt Lancaster
- Spring in a Small Town (Xiǎochéng zhī chūn), directed by Fei Mu – (China)
- Spring in Park Lane, starring Anna Neagle and Michael Wilding – (GB)
- State of the Union, starring Spencer Tracy and Katharine Hepburn
- Station West, starring Dick Powell and Jane Greer
- The Street with No Name, starring Richard Widmark

=== T ===
- Tap Roots, starring Van Heflin and Susan Hayward
- La Terra Trema (The Earth Will Tremble), directed by Luchino Visconti – (Italy)
- They Live by Night, directed by Nicholas Ray, starring Farley Granger and Cathy O'Donnell
- The Three Musketeers, starring Lana Turner and Gene Kelly
- The Time of Your Life, starring James Cagney
- Tragic Hunt (Caccia tragica) – (Italy)
- The Treasure of the Sierra Madre, directed by John Huston (Oscars for best director and best screenplay), starring Humphrey Bogart and Walter Huston (best supporting actor)
- Treasured Earth (Talpalatnyi föld) – (Hungary)
- Los tres huastecos, starring Pedro Infante – (Mexico)

=== U ===
- Under the Sun of Rome (Sotto il sole di Roma), directed by Renato Castellani – (Italy)
- Unfaithfully Yours, starring Linda Darnell and Rex Harrison
- Up in Central Park, directed by William A. Seiter, starring Deanna Durbin and Vincent Price
- Ustedes los ricos (you the Rich), starring Pedro Infante – (Mexico)

=== V ===
- Vidya, starring Dev Anand – (India)

=== W ===
- Waverley Steps – (GB) documentary
- Western Heritage, starring Tim Holt
- When My Baby Smiles at Me, starring Betty Grable and Dan Dailey
- When You Come Home
- Whiplash, starring Alexis Smith and Dane Clark
- Whispering Smith, starring Alan Ladd and Robert Preston
- The Winslow Boy, directed by Anthony Asquith, starring Robert Donat and Margaret Leighton – (GB)

=== Y ===
- Yellow Sky, starring Gregory Peck, Anne Baxter, Richard Widmark
- You Gotta Stay Happy, starring Joan Fontaine and James Stewart
- The Young Guard (Molodaya Gvardiya) – (U.S.S.R.)

== Serials ==
- G-Men Never Forget, starring Clayton Moore
- Dangers of the Canadian Mounted
- Adventures of Frank and Jesse James, starring Clayton Moore
- Superman, starring Kirk Alyn and Noel Neill
- Tex Granger
- Congo Bill

== Short film series ==
- Mickey Mouse (1928–1953)
- Terrytoons (1930–1964)
- Popeye (1933–1957)
- The Three Stooges (1934–1959)
- Donald Duck (1936–1956)
- Goofy (1939–1953)
- Tom and Jerry (1940–1958)
- Bugs Bunny (1940–1964)
- The Fox and the Crow (1941–1950)
- Woody Woodpecker (1941–1949)
- Mighty Mouse (1942–1955)
- Chip and Dale (1943–1956)
- Droopy (1943–1958)
- Yosemite Sam (1945–1964)
- George and Junior (1946—1948)
- Blackie the Sheep (1947–1949)

== Births ==
- January 7 – Kenny Loggins, American singer-songwriter
- January 10 – William Sanderson, American actor
- January 12 – Anthony Andrews, English actor
- January 13 – Malcolm Storry, British actor
- January 14 – Carl Weathers, American actor and football player (d. 2024)
- January 16 – John Carpenter, American director, producer and screenwriter
- January 18 – M. C. Gainey, American character actor
- January 20 – Geno Silva, American actor (d. 2020)
- January 21 – Trey Wilson, American character actor (d. 1989)
- January 25 – Emily Richard, British actress (d. 2024)
- January 28 – Mikhail Baryshnikov, Latvian-American actor
- January 29 – Marc Singer, Canadian actor
- February 1 – Rick James, American singer and actor (d. 2004)
- February 3 – Thomas Rosales Jr., American actor and stuntman
- February 5
  - Christopher Guest, American-British screenwriter, musician, director, actor and comedian
  - Barbara Hershey, American actress
  - Tom Wilkinson, English actor (d. 2023)
- February 9 – David Hayman, Scottish actor and director
- February 13 – Kitten Natividad, Mexican-American actress (d. 2022)
- February 15 – Tino Insana, American actor, producer, writer, voice artist and comedian (d. 2017)
- February 16 – Troy Evans, American actor
- February 17 – Anne Lonnberg, American actress and singer of Swedish descent
- February 18 – Sinéad Cusack, Irish actress
- February 20 – Jennifer O'Neill, American actress
- February 22
  - John Ashton, American actor (d. 2024)
  - Joe Cortese, American actor
- February 23 – Dennis Waterman, English actor and singer (d. 2022)
- February 25 – K. P. A. C. Lalitha, Indian actress (d. 2022)
- February 27 – Féodor Atkine, French actor
- February 28
  - Mike Figgis, English director and screenwriter
  - Bernadette Peters, American actress and singer
  - Mercedes Ruehl, American actress
- February 29
  - Ken Foree, American actor
  - Kerry Walker, Australian actress
- March 1 – Karl Johnson, Welsh actor
- March 3 – Danny Keogh, South African actor (d. 2019)
- March 4 – Brian Cummings, American voice actor
- March 5 – Annette Charles, American actress and dancer (d. 2011)
- March 6 – Anna Maria Horsford, American actress
- March 14 – Billy Crystal, American actor and comedian
- March 18 - Toni Bertorelli, Italian actor (d. 2017)
- March 20 – Helene Vannari, Estonian actress (d. 2022)
- March 23 – Penelope Milford, American actress (d. 2025)
- March 24 – Adrian Shergold, British director
- March 25 – Bonnie Bedelia, American actress
- March 26 – Steven Tyler, American singer, songwriter, musician and actor
- March 28 – Matthew Corbett, English television personality, actor, writer, puppeteer and comedian
- March 29 – Bud Cort, American actor (d. 2026)
- March 31 – Rhea Perlman, American actress and writer
- April 5 – Carlos Carrasco, American actor
- April 6 – Patrika Darbo, American actress
- April 9 –
- April 9
  - Jaya Bachchan, Indian actress
  - Badja Djola, American actor (d. 2005)
- April 20 – Gregory Itzin, American character actor (d. 2022)
- April 25 – Freda Foh Shen, American film, television and theatre actress
- April 28 – Marcia Strassman, American actress and singer (d. 2014)
- May 3
  - Larry Brandenburg, American actor
  - Chris Mulkey, American actor
- May 6 – Richard Cox, American actor
- May 11 – Pam Ferris, Welsh actress
- May 12
  - Lindsay Crouse, American actress
  - Richard Riehle, American actor (d. 2026)
- May 14 – Walter Olkewicz, American character actor (d. 2021)
- May 15 – Malcolm Stewart, Canadian actor
- May 18 – Jesper Christensen, Danish actor
- May 19 – Bruce Jarchow, American actor
- May 20 – Will Lyman, American actor
- May 21 – Jonathan Hyde, Australian-born English actor
- May 27 - Ken Lerner, American actor
- May 29 - Nick Mancuso, Italian-Canadian actor and director
- June 1 – Powers Boothe, American actor (d. 2017)
- June 7 – Xavier Saint-Macary, French actor (d. 1988)
- June 11 – Michael Swan, American actor
- June 18 – Philip Jackson, English actor
- June 19 – Phylicia Rashad, American actress, singer and director
- June 21 – Ian McEwan, English author
- June 22 – Steve Eastin, American character actor
- June 25 – Michael Lembeck, American actor and director
- June 28
  - Kathy Bates, American actress
  - J. Michael Riva, American production designer (d. 2012)
- June 29 – Danny Adcock, Australian actor
- July 2 – Saul Rubinek, German-born Canadian actor, director and producer
- July 5 – William Hootkins, American actor (d. 2005)
- July 6 – Nathalie Baye, French actress (d. 2026)
- July 7 – Lori Tan Chinn, American actress and comedian
- July 9 – Ray Baker, American actor
- July 12
  - Susan Blu, American voice actress, voice director and casting director
  - Ben Burtt, American sound designer
- July 13 – Catherine Breillat, French director
- July 15 – Richard Franklin, Australian director (d. 2007)
- July 16 – Rubén Blades, Panamanian musician, composer and actor
- July 17 – Wayne Sleep, British choreographer and actor
- July 18 – James Faulkner, British actor
- July 20 – Muse Watson, American actor
- July 26 – Leon Vitali, English actor (d. 2022)
- July 28 – Georgia Engel, American actress (d. 2019)
- July 30 – Jean Reno, French actor
- August 5 – Barbara Flynn, English actress
- August 13 – Peter Iacangelo, American actor (d. 2021)
- August 14 – Joseph Marcell, British actor and comedian
- August 18 – Grainger Hines, American actor, writer, producer and director
- August 19 – Jim Carter, English actor
- August 20 – John Noble, Australian actor
- August 30 – Lewis Black, American actor and comedian
- September 1 – James Rebhorn, American character actor (d. 2014)
- September 4 – Michael Berryman, American character actor
- September 7 – Susan Blakely, American actress
- September 11
  - Philip Alford, former American actor
  - Michael Sacks, American actor
- September 15
  - Wilbur Fitzgerald, American actor
  - Kathryn Kates, American actress (d. 2022)
- September 17 – John Ritter, American actor (d. 2003)
- September 19
  - Jan Hoag, American actress
  - Jeremy Irons, English actor
- September 24
  - Gordon Clapp, American actor
  - Phil Hartman, Canadian-American actor (d. 1998)
- September 25 - Mimi Kennedy, American actress
- September 26 – Olivia Newton-John, British-born Australian actress and singer (d. 2022)
- September 27 – A Martinez, American actor and singer
- October 2 – Persis Khambatta, Indian actress and model (d. 1998)
- October 3 - Niall Buggy, Irish actor
- October 5 – Sal Viscuso, American actor
- October 6 – Frances Tomelty, Northern Irish actress
- October 8 – James Harper, American actor
- October 11
  - John R. Cherry III, American director and screenwriter (d. 2022)
  - Jonathan Hadary, American actor
- October 14 – Gerard Murphy, Irish actor (d. 2013)
- October 16 – Hema Malini, Indian actress and politician
- October 17
  - Margot Kidder, Canadian actress (d. 2018)
  - George Wendt, American actor and comedian (d. 2025)
- October 21 – Tom Everett, American actor
- October 22 - Christopher Curry, American character actor
- October 24 - Biff Wiff, American actor (d. 2025)
- October 28 – Telma Hopkins, American actress and singer
- October 29 – Kate Jackson, American actress
- October 30
  - Don Creech, American actor
  - Olivia Leyva, Mexican actress and television presenter (d. 2019)
  - Garry McDonald, Australian comedian, television host and actor
- October 31 – Michael Kitchen, English actor and producer
- November 3 – Robert Pugh, Welsh actor
- November 4
  - Delia Casanova, Mexican actress
  - Benz Hui, Hong Kong actor (d. 2025)
- November 11 – Vincent Schiavelli, American actor (d. 2005)
- November 13 – Adelle Lutz, American model, actress and costume designer
- November 14 – Robert Ginty, American actor and producer (d. 2009)
- November 18
  - Dom Irrera, American actor and stand-up comedian
  - Andrea Marcovicci, American actress and singer
- November 20 – Richard Masur, American character actor
- November 26 – Marianne Muellerleile, American actress
- November 28 – Agnieszka Holland, Polish director and screenwriter
- November 30 – Larry Bishop, American actor, screenwriter and director
- December 1 – Remo Girone, Italian actor (d. 2025)
- December 3 – Ozzy Osbourne, English heavy metal musician, actor and media personality (d. 2025)
- December 6 – JoBeth Williams, American actress and director
- December 9 – Ron Vawter, American actor (d. 1994)
- December 14 – Dee Wallace, American actress
- December 15
  - Melanie Chartoff, American actress and comedian
  - Cassandra Harris, Australian actress (d. 1991)
- December 21 – Samuel L. Jackson, American actor and producer
- December 22 – Lynne Thigpen, American actress (d. 2003)
- December 27 – Gérard Depardieu, French actor and filmmaker
- December 31
  - Joe Dallesandro, American actor
  - Donna Summer, American singer and songwriter (d. 2012)

== Deaths ==
- January 7 – Charles C. Wilson, 53, American actor, It Happened One Night, The Hell Cat, Waterfront Lady, Legion of Terror
- February 11 – Sergei Eisenstein, 50, Russian film director, Battleship Potemkin, Alexander Nevsky, Ivan the Terrible, Part One, Ivan the Terrible, Part Two
- February 14 – James Baskett, 44, American actor, Song of the South
- February 23 – Patricia Farr, 35, American actress, Lady Luck, Criminals of the Air, Girls Can Play, Lady Behave!
- March 10 – William L. Thorne, 69, American actor, Vanishing Men
- March 25 – Warren Hymer, 42, American actor, Up the River, She's Dangerous, The Lady and the Mob
- May 3 – Gideon Wahlberg, 58, Swedish actor, writer and film director
- May 12 – Dante Cappelli, 82, Italian actor, Macbeth, Love Everlasting, The Mysterious Mirror
- May 26 – Torsten Bergström, 51, Swedish actor and director, The Pilgrimage to Kevlaar, Trollebokungen, Ungdom
- May 29 – May Whitty, 82, English actress, Lassie Come Home, Gaslight, My Name Is Julia Ross
- July 5 – Carole Landis, 29, American actress, Topper Returns, I Wake Up Screaming, One Million B.C., Four Jills in a Jeep
- July 15 – William Selig, 84, American pioneer studio builder
- July 23 – David Wark Griffith, 73, American film director, The Birth of a Nation, Intolerance, Broken Blossoms, Orphans of the Storm
- August 13 – Elaine Hammerstein, 51, American actress, Paint and Powder, The Midnight Express
- August 13 – Edwin Maxwell, 62, American actor, Duck Soup, Cleopatra, His Girl Friday
- September 24 – Warren William, 53, American actor, Gold Diggers of 1933, The Wolf Man, Lady for a Day, Imitation of Life
- September 28 – Gregg Toland, 44, American cinematographer, Citizen Kane, The Best Years of Our Lives, The Long Voyage Home, December 7th: The Movie, Wuthering Heights, The Grapes of Wrath, Song of the South, The Little Foxes
- October 10 – Mary Eaton, 47, American actress, Glorifying the American Girl, The Cocoanuts
- October 13 – Samuel S. Hinds, 73, American actor, It's a Wonderful Life, Buck Privates
- October 16 – Nora Lane, 43, American actress, The Cisco Kid, Six-Gun Trail
- October 21 – Elissa Landi, 43, Austrian-American actress, The Count of Monte Cristo, After the Thin Man
- November 9 – Edgar Kennedy, 58, American actor, Duck Soup, A Star Is Born
- December 20 – C. Aubrey Smith, 85, English actor, A Bill of Divorcement, Madame Curie

== Film debuts ==
- John Agar – Fort Apache
- Rona Anderson – Sleeping Car to Trieste
- Maxine Audley – Anna Karenina
- Michael Balfour – Just William's Luck
- Claire Bloom – The Blind Goddess
- Martin Boddey – A Song for Tomorrow
- Scott Brady – The Counterfeiters
- Beau Bridges – No Minor Vices
- Pat Buttram – The Strawberry Roan
- Capucine – The Eagle with Two Heads
- Ian Carmichael – Bond Street
- Phyllis Coates – Smart Girls Don't Talk
- Doris Day – Romance on the High Seas
- Archie Duncan – Counterblast
- Edward Evans – London Belongs to Me
- José Ferrer – Joan of Arc
- Joe Flynn – The Babe Ruth Story
- Arthur Franz – Jungle Patrol
- Kathleen Freeman – The Naked City
- Aldo Giuffrè – Assunta Spina
- Michael Gough – Blanche Fury
- James Gregory – The Naked City
- James Griffith – Blonde Ice
- Laurence Harvey – House of Darkness
- Thomas Browne Henry – Hollow Triumph
- Audrey Hepburn – Dutch in Seven Lessons
- Teri Horváth – Treasured Earth
- Rock Hudson – Fighter Squadron
- Morgan Jones – Hometown Girl
- Howard Keel – The Small Voice
- Klaus Kinski – Morituri
- Eartha Kitt – Casbah
- Berry Kroeger – The Iron Curtain
- Christopher Lee – Corridor of Mirrors
- Ronald Leigh-Hunt – No Orchids for Miss Blandish
- Margaret Leighton – Bonnie Prince Charlie
- Arthur Lovegrove – Noose
- Frank Lovejoy – Black Bart
- Klara Luchko – The Young Guard
- Ralph Moody – Tex Granger
- Nonna Mordyukova – The Young Guard
- Terence Morgan – Hamlet
- Audie Murphy – Texas, Brooklyn & Heaven
- Barbara Murray – Anna Karenina
- Laurence Naismith – Trouble in the Air
- Jeanette Nolan – Macbeth
- Tamara Nosova – The Young Guard
- Robert Osterloh – The Dark Past
- Debra Paget – Cry of the City
- Irene Papas – Fallen Angels
- Nehemiah Persoff – The Naked City
- John Randolph – The Naked City
- Debbie Reynolds – June Bride
- Richard Rober – Call Northside 777
- Robert Rockwell – You Gotta Stay Happy
- Ewen Solon – London Belongs to Me
- Emy Storm – Banketten
- Russ Tamblyn – The Boy with Green Hair
- Aline Towne – Homecoming
- Patrick Troughton – Escape
- John van Dreelen – But Not in Vain
- Sam Wanamaker – My Girl Tisa
