= 1948 in British television =

This is a list of British television related events from 1948.

== Events ==
- 5 January – Television Newsreel is first shown on the BBC Television Service.
- 3 June – A Laurel and Hardy short film is shown for the first time on the BBC Television Service. The 1929 comedy Perfect Day begins what would become decades long appearances of the comedy duo on the BBC.
- 29 July – The BBC Television Service begins its coverage of the Olympic Games in London by broadcasting the opening ceremony. From now until the closing ceremony on 14 August the BBC Television Service will broadcast an average three and a half hours a day of live coverage from the Games, using a special coaxial cable linking the main venue at Wembley Stadium to the television service's base at Alexandra Palace. This is the most ambitious sustained outside broadcast yet attempted by the BBC, but passes off with no serious problems.

== Debuts ==
- 5 January – Television Newsreel (1948–1954)
- 8 February – Pygmalion (1948)
- 14 March – I Killed the Count (1948)
- 21 March – Men of Darkness (1948)
- 1 August – Kid Flanaghan (1948)
- 15 August – The Front Page (1948)
- Unknown – Television Dancing Club (1948–1962) (Dancing Club, 1963–1964)

== Continuing television shows ==
=== 1920s ===
- BBC Wimbledon (1927–1939, 1946–2019, 2021–present)

=== 1930s ===
- Picture Page (1936–1939, 1946–1952)
- For the Children (1937–1939, 1946–1952)
- Trooping the Colour (1937–1939, 1946–2019, 2023–present)
- The Boat Race (1938–1939, 1946–2019, 2021–present)
- BBC Cricket (1939, 1946–1999, 2020–present)

=== 1940s ===
- Kaleidoscope (1946–1953)
- Muffin the Mule (1946–1955, 2005–2006)
- Café Continental (1947–1953)

== Births ==
- 2 January – Deborah Watling, actress (died 2017)
- 19 January – Michael J. Jackson, actor
- 24 February – Dennis Waterman, actor (died 2022)
- 26 February – Roberta Taylor, actress (died 2024)
- 10 March – Richard Park, media personality and businessman
- 25 March – Lynn Faulds Wood, Scottish-born consumer affairs presenter (died 2020)
- 28 March – Matthew Corbett, television presenter and comedian
- 4 April – Derek Thompson, Northern Irish actor
- 12 April – Jeremy Beadle, television presenter, writer and producer (died 2008)
- 11 May – Pam Ferris, actress
- 16 May – Judy Finnigan, television presenter
- 31 May – Lynda Bellingham, actress and broadcaster (died 2014)
- 18 June – Philip Jackson, actor
- 8 August – Wincey Willis, broadcaster (died 2024)
- 19 September – Jeremy Irons, actor
- 27 September – Michele Dotrice, actress
- 3 November – Lulu, singer and entertainer
- 29 November – David Rintoul, actor
- 22 December – Noel Edmonds, television presenter and executive

== Deaths ==
- 30 July — Hay Petrie, actor (born 1895)

== See also ==
- 1948 in British music
- 1948 in the United Kingdom
- List of British films of 1948
