= 1948 in British music =

This is a summary of 1948 in music in the United Kingdom.

== Events ==
- 10 January – The Amadeus Quartet (formed as the Brainin Quartet in 1947) gives its first recital under this name, at the Wigmore Hall in London, underwritten by Imogen Holst.
- 16 January – The day after her New York concert debut, Kathleen Ferrier writes to her sister: "Some of the critics are enthusiastic, others unimpressed".
- 17 April – The death of Alice, Viscountess Wimborne, lover of William Walton, ends their 14-year affair.
- 21 April
  - Ralph Vaughan Williams' Symphony No. 6 is premiered by the BBC Symphony Orchestra conducted by Sir Adrian Boult at the Royal Albert Hall in London and broadcast on the BBC Home Service.
  - The National Youth Orchestra of Great Britain gives its first concert.
- 5 June – Opening of the first Aldeburgh Festival, founded by Benjamin Britten, Eric Crozier and Peter Pears.
- 13 October – Kathleen Ferrier joins Sir John Barbirolli and the Hallé Orchestra in a broadcast performance of Mahler's song cycle Kindertotenlieder.
- October – The Duke of Edinburgh is introduced to musical comedy star Pat Kirkwood in her dressing room after a show. They are seen together at a restaurant, creating a scandal in the newspapers.
- 13 October – William Walton marries Susana Gil Passo.
- date unknown
  - Steuart Wilson becomes head of music at the BBC; the appointment will result in the forced retirement of Sir Adrian Boult as chief conductor of the BBC Symphony Orchestra.
  - Harman Grisewood replaces George Barnes as controller of the BBC Third Programme.
  - The National School of Opera is founded by Joan Cross.

== Popular music ==
- Anne Shelton – "If You Ever Fall in Love Again" (Dick Farrelly)
- Dorothy Squires – "A Tree in the Meadow" (Billy Reid)

== Classical music: new works ==
- Malcolm Arnold – The Smoke (Overture), Op. 21
- Arnold Bax – Magnificat
- Benjamin Britten – Saint Nicolas, for tenor soloist, children's chorus, chorus, and orchestra
- Michael Tippett – Suite in D for the Birthday of Prince Charles
- Ralph Vaughan Williams – Partita for Double String Orchestra

== Opera ==
- Arthur Bliss – The Olympians
- Norman Demuth – Le Flambeau

== Film and Incidental music ==
- William Alwyn – The Fallen Idol directed by Carol Reed, starring Ralph Richardson.
- Arnold Bax – Oliver Twist directed by David Lean, starring Alec Guinness.
- Brian Easdale – The Red Shoes directed and produced by Michael Powell and Emeric Pressburger.
- Constant Lambert – Anna Karenina, starring Vivien Leigh and Ralph Richardson.
- Elisabeth Lutyens – Penny and the Pownall Case (the first feature film to be scored by a female British composer).
- Ralph Vaughan Williams – Scott of the Antarctic, starring John Mills.
- William Walton – Hamlet, directed by and starring Laurence Olivier.
- John Wooldridge – The Guinea Pig, starring Richard Attenborough.

== Musical theatre ==
- 10 March – Carissima, starring Ginger Rogers and David Hughes, opens at the Palace Theatre and runs for 488 performances.
- 22 December – High Button Shoes (Jule Styne and Sammy Cahn) opens at the Hippodrome and runs for 291 performances.

== Musical films ==
- A Date with a Dream, starring Terry-Thomas, Jeannie Carson and Wally Patch.
- Bless 'Em All, starring Max Bygraves.
- One Night with You, directed by Terence Young and starring Nino Martini, Patricia Roc and Bonar Colleano.

== Births ==
- 17 January – Mick Taylor, guitarist
- 19 January – Amanda Holden, English playwright, lyricist and composer (died 2021)
- 3 February – Gavin Henderson, English trumpet player and conductor
- 28 February – Geoff Nicholls, keyboardist (Black Sabbath) (died 2017)
- 4 March – Chris Squire, guitarist and singer-songwriter (died 2015)
- 11 March – Jan Schelhaas, keyboard player
- 22 March – Andrew Lloyd Webber, composer
- 16 April – Robert Kirby, arranger (died 2009)
- 28 April – Scott Fitzgerald (William McPhail), singer
- 12 May – Steve Winwood, R&B singer
- 15 May – Brian Eno, synthesizer virtuoso and composer
- 21 May – Leo Sayer, singer-songwriter
- 29 May – Michael Berkeley, composer
- 6 June – Richard Sinclair, bass player (Caravan, The Wilde Flowers, Camel and Hatfield and the North)
- 1 July – John Ford, English-American singer-songwriter and guitarist (Strawbs, The Monks and Elmer Gantry's Velvet Opera)
- 4 July – Jeremy Spencer, English guitarist (Fleetwood Mac)
- 5 July – Alan Hazeldine, pianist and conductor (died 2008)
- 21 July – Cat Stevens (Steven Demetre Georgiou), singer-songwriter
- 2 August – Andy Fairweather Low, guitarist, songwriter, producer and vocalist
- 26 September – Olivia Newton-John, singer and actress (died 2022)
- 3 October – Ian MacDonald (Ian MacCormick), music critic (died 2003)
- 11 October – David Rendall, operatic tenor
- 24 October
  - Dale Griffin, rock drummer and producer (died 2016)
  - Barry Ryan, singer-songwriter (died 2021)
  - Paul Ryan, singer-songwriter and producer (died 1992)
- 22 November – Mick Rock, rock photographer (died 2021)
- 3 November – Lulu (Marie McDonald McLaughlin Lawrie), singer and actress
- 1 December – Colin Sell, pianist
- 3 December – Ozzy Osbourne, singer-songwriter
- 20 December – Alan Parsons, engineer and record producer

== Deaths ==
- 9 January – Violet Gordon-Woodhouse, harpsichordist and clavichordist, 75
- 21 February – Frederic Lamond, pianist, 80
- 17 May – David Evans, composer, 74
- 14 June – John Blackwood McEwen, composer, 80
- 8 July – Reginald Somerville, composer and actor, 81
- 20 August – David John de Lloyd, composer, 65
- 12 September – Rupert D'Oyly Carte, impresario, 70
- 20 November – Robert Carr, baritone, 67
- 24 November – Nellie Wallace, music hall star, actress, comedian, dancer and songwriter, 78
- 14 December – R. O. Morris, British composer and teacher, 62
- 31 December – Ethel Barns, violinist, pianist and composer, 74

== See also ==
- 1948 in British television
- 1948 in the United Kingdom
- List of British films of 1948
