= A Thief in Paradise =

A Thief in Paradise may refer to:

- A Thief in Paradise (1925 film), an American silent drama film
- A Thief in Paradise (1952 film), an Italian comedy film
