= 6th British Academy Film Awards =

1953 film awards ceremony

- Date: 5 March 1953
- Site: Leicester Square Theatre, Westminster, London, United Kingdom

Highlights
- Best Film: The Sound Barrier
- Best British Film: The Sound Barrier
- Most awards: The Sound Barrier (3)
- Most nominations: The Sound Barrier (5)

The 6th British Academy Film Awards, retroactively known as the British Academy Film Awards, given by the British Academy of Film and Television Arts (BAFTA) (previously the British Film Academy) in 1953, honoured the best films of 1952. The Sound Barrier won the award for Best Film.

== Winners and nominees ==
=== Best Film ===
The Sound Barrier

- The African Queen
- Angels One Five
- The Boy Kumasenu
- Carrie
- Casque d'or
- Cry, the Beloved Country
- Death of a Salesman
- Limelight
- Mandy
- Miracolo a Milano
- Los Olvidados
- Outcast of the Islands
- Rashomon
- The River
- Singin' in the Rain
- A Streetcar Named Desire
- Viva Zapata!

=== Best Foreign Actor ===
Marlon Brando in Viva Zapata!

- Humphrey Bogart in The African Queen
- Fredric March in Death of a Salesman
- Pierre Fresnay in Dieu a besoin des hommes
- Francesco Golisano in Miracolo a Milano

=== Best British Actor ===
Ralph Richardson in The Sound Barrier

- Laurence Olivier in Carrie
- Alastair Sim in Folly to Be Wise
- Jack Hawkins in Mandy
- James Hayter in The Pickwick Papers
- Nigel Patrick in The Sound Barrier

=== Best British Actress ===
Vivien Leigh in A Streetcar Named Desire

- Celia Johnson in I Believe In You
- Phyllis Calvert in Mandy
- Ann Todd in The Sound Barrier

=== Best Foreign Actress ===
Simone Signoret in Casque d'or

- Nicole Stephane in Les Enfants Terribles
- Judy Holliday in The Marrying Kind
- Edwige Feuillère in Olivia
- Katharine Hepburn in Pat and Mike

=== Best Documentary Film ===
Royal Journey

- Ocean Terminal
- The Open Window
- Opera School
- Rig 20
- The Streamlined Pig
- Fisherman of Negombo
- Highlights of Farnborough 1952
- Journey into History
- Le Mans 1952
- Nature's Half Acre

=== Best British Film ===
The Sound Barrier

- Angels One Five
- Cry, the Beloved Country
- Mandy
- Outcast of the Islands

=== Special Award ===
Animated Genesis

- The Angry Boy
- The Moon
- The Stanlow Story
- Balance 1950
- Basic Principles of Lubrication
- Demonstrations in Perception
- Machining of Metals
- Organization of the Human Body
- To The Rescue
- A Phantasy
- The Carlsen Story

=== UN Award ===
Cry, The Beloved Country

=== Most Promising Newcomer To Film ===
Claire Bloom in Limelight

- Dorothy Tutin in The Importance of Being Earnest
- Dorothy Alison in Mandy
- Mandy Miller in Mandy
