= Matrimonial Agency (1953 film) =

1953 film by Giorgio Pastina

- Directed by: Giorgio Pastina
- Written by: Edoardo Anton; Giovanni Grimaldi; Ugo Guerra; Giorgio Pastina; Eduardo Scarpetta (play); Alberto Vecchietti
- Produced by: Aldo Guglielmetti
- Starring: Delia Scala; Aroldo Tieri; Erminio Macario
- Cinematography: Bitto Albertini
- Edited by: Mario Serandrei
- Music by: Carlo Innocenzi
- Production company: Grazia Film
- Distributed by: Di Paolo Film
- Release date: 1953
- Running time: 90 minutes
- Country: Italy
- Language: Italian

Matrimonial Agency (Italian: Agenzia matrimoniale) is a 1953 Italian comedy film directed by Giorgio Pastina and starring Delia Scala, Aroldo Tieri and Erminio Macario. It was based on a play by Eduardo Scarpetta.

== Plot ==
Ms. Elena runs a marriage agency in a big city. The most diverse people come to her: Mrs. Amalia doesn't stop complaining about the betrothed chosen for her nephew, Donato has dragged her friend Peppino, a passionate cyclist, there, so that he can finally find a wife. Elena believes that the ideal woman could be her client, Mara, who has a great passion for sport.

When she learns that the rich industrialist who was to marry Mitzi, another client of hers, has died, Elena sends her collaborator Mario, so that he can inform Mitzi as tactfully as possible and propose another suitor. There is also great anticipation for the arrival of Lodolini and the bride found by Elena. Finally, the right time may have come for Mrs. Elena too.

== Cast ==
- Delia Scala as Mitzi
- Aroldo Tieri as Mario
- Erminio Macario as Peppino
- Pina Renzi as Elena
- Virgilio Riento as Padre di Peppino
- Vera Carmi as Luisa
- Fulvia Franco as Mara
- Galeazzo Benti as Lodolini
- Laura Gore as Anna
- Ernesto Almirante as Zio di Lodolini
- Eva Vanicek as Ada
- Oscar Blando as Elio
- Johanna Hamilton as L'Americana
- Gisella Monaldi as Zia Amalia

== Bibliography ==
- Goble, Alan. The Complete Index to Literary Sources in Film. Walter de Gruyter, 1999.
