= Mario Vitale =

Italian actor

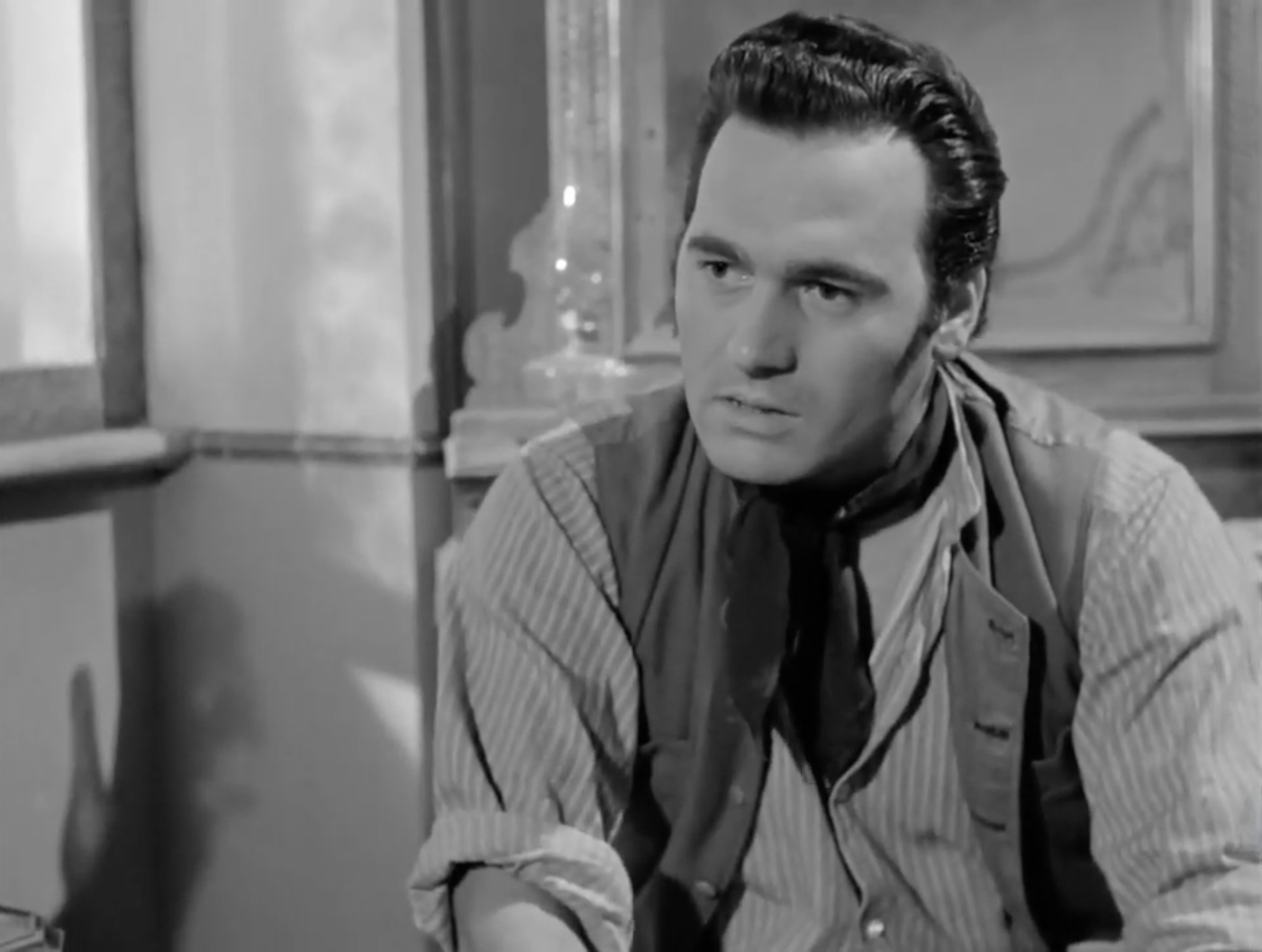
- Vitale in The Boatman of Amalfi (1954)
- Born: 1 April 1923; Salerno, Italy
- Died: 25 October 2003 (aged 80); Salerno, Italy
- Occupation: Actor
- Years active: 1950-1954

Mario Vitale (1923–2003) was an Italian film actor. Vitale was a fisherman chosen by Roberto Rossellini to star alongside Ingrid Bergman in the 1950 film Stromboli. He played prominent roles in several other films until the mid-1950s.

== Filmography ==
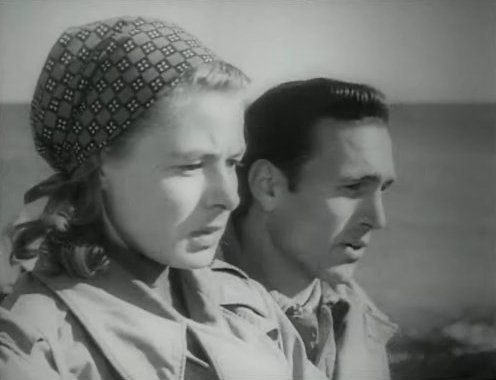
Vitale with Ingrid Bergman in Stromboli (1950)

| Year | Title | Role | Notes |
|---|---|---|---|
| 1950 | Stromboli | Antonio | |
| 1950 | Sunday in August | Renato | |
| 1951 | Tragic Serenade | | |
| 1951 | Destiny | Franco Borielli | |
| 1952 | Il prezzo dell'onore | Antonio | |
| 1953 | Perdonami! | Mario | |
| 1954 | Terra straniera | | |
| 1954 | La peccatrice dell'isola | Francesco | |
| 1954 | The Boatman of Amalfi | Aspreno Selva | (final film role) |

== Bibliography ==
- Bondanella, Peter. The Films of Roberto Rossellini. Cambridge University Press, 1993.
