= List of British films of 1948 =

A list of films produced in the United Kingdom in 1948:

== 1948 ==
Title	Director	Cast	Genre	Notes
1948
Against the Wind	Charles Crichton	Robert Beatty, Simone Signoret, Jack Warner	World War II	
Anna Karenina	Julien Duvivier	Vivien Leigh, Ralph Richardson, Kieron Moore	Literary drama	
Another Shore	Charles Crichton	Robert Beatty, Moira Lister, Stanley Holloway	Comedy	
Blanche Fury	Marc Allégret	Valerie Hobson, Stewart Granger, Michael Gough	Drama	
Bless 'Em All	Robert Jordan Hill	Hal Monty, Max Bygraves, Jack Milroy	Musical comedy	
The Blind Goddess	Harold French	Eric Portman, Anne Crawford, Hugh Williams	Drama	
Bond Street	Gordon Parry	Jean Kent, Derek Farr, Roland Young	Drama	
Bonnie Prince Charlie	Anthony Kimmins	David Niven, Margaret Leighton, Jack Hawkins	Historical drama	
Brass Monkey	Thornton Freeland	Carroll Levis, Carole Landis, Herbert Lom	Crime drama	
Broken Journey	Ken Annakin	Phyllis Calvert, James Donald, Margot Grahame	Drama	
But Not in Vain	Edmond T. Gréville	Raymond Lovell, Bruce Lester, Agnes Bernelle	World War II	
The Calendar	Arthur Crabtree	Greta Gynt, John McCallum, Raymond Lovell	Drama	
Call of the Blood	John Clements, Ladislao Vajda	Kay Hammond, John Clements	Drama	Co-production with Italy
Calling Paul Temple	Maclean Rogers	John Bentley, Dinah Sheridan, Margaretta Scott	Mystery	
The Clouded Crystal	Alan Cullimore	Patrick Waddington, Lind Joyce	Mystery	
Colonel Bogey	Terence Fisher	Jack Train, Mary Jerrold	Fantasy	
Corridor of Mirrors	Terence Young	Eric Portman, Edana Romney	Drama	
Counterblast	Paul L. Stein	Robert Beatty, Mervyn Johns	Thriller	
Cup-tie Honeymoon	John E. Blakeley	Sandy Powell, Dan Young	Sports/comedy	
The Dark Road	Alfred J. Goulding	Mackenzie Ward, Veronica Rose	Crime	
A Date with a Dream	Dicky Leeman	Terry-Thomas, Jeannie Carson	Musical/comedy	
Daughter of Darkness	Lance Comfort	Anne Crawford, Maxwell Reed	Crime	
Daybreak	Compton Bennett	Eric Portman, Ann Todd, Maxwell Reed	Thriller	
Death in the Hand	A. Barr-Smith	Esme Percy, Ernest Jay, Cecile Chevreau	Short mystery	
Dick Barton: Special Agent	Alfred J. Goulding	Don Stannard	Action based on radio serial	
Easy Money	Bernard Knowles	Petula Clark, Mervyn Johns	Comedy/drama	
Elizabeth of Ladymead	Herbert Wilcox	Anna Neagle, Hugh Williams	Drama	
Escape	Joseph L. Mankiewicz	Rex Harrison, Peggy Cummins	Thriller	
Escape from Broadmoor	John Gilling	John Le Mesurier, Victoria Hopper	Thriller	
Esther Waters	Ian Dalrymple	Kathleen Ryan, Dirk Bogarde	Historical drama	
The Fallen Idol	Carol Reed	Ralph Richardson, Michèle Morgan, Bobby Henrey	Drama	
The First Gentleman	Alberto Cavalcanti	Jean-Pierre Aumont, Joan Hopkins	Historical drama	
The Fool and the Princess	William C. Hammond	Bruce Lester, Lesley Brook	Drama	
Good-Time Girl	David MacDonald	Jean Kent, Herbert Lom, Dennis Price	Drama	
The Greed of William Hart	Oswald Mitchell	Tod Slaughter, Henry Oscar	Horror	
The Guinea Pig	Roy Boulting	Richard Attenborough, Sheila Sim	Drama	
A Gunman Has Escaped	Richard M. Grey	John Harvey, Maria Charles, Jane Arden	Crime	
Hamlet	Laurence Olivier	Laurence Olivier, Jean Simmons, Basil Sydney	Shakespearean drama	Number 69 in the list of BFI Top 100 British films; winner of four Academy Awards
Here Come the Huggetts	Ken Annakin	Jack Warner, Kathleen Harrison	Comedy	
Holidays with Pay	John E. Blakeley	Frank Randle, Tessie O'Shea	Comedy	
House of Darkness	Oswald Mitchell	Laurence Harvey, Lesley Brook	Horror	
Idol of Paris	Leslie Arliss	Michael Rennie, Christine Norden	Drama	
It's Hard to Be Good	Jeffrey Dell	Jimmy Hanley, Anne Crawford	Comedy	
The Little Ballerina	Lewis Gilbert	Yvonne Marsh, Marian Chapman	Drama	
London Belongs to Me	Sidney Gilliat	Richard Attenborough, Alastair Sim	Drama	
Look Before You Love	Harold Huth	Margaret Lockwood, Griffith Jones	Drama	
Love in Waiting	Douglas Peirce	David Tomlinson, Andrew Crawford	Comedy	
Miranda	Ken Annakin	Glynis Johns, Googie Withers	Romance/fantasy	
The Monkey's Paw	Norman Lee	Milton Rosmer, Megs Jenkins	Horror	
Mr. Perrin and Mr. Traill	Lawrence Huntington	David Farrar, Marius Goring	Drama	
My Brother Jonathan	Harold French	Michael Denison, Dulcie Gray	Drama	
My Brother's Keeper	Alfred Roome	Jack Warner, George Cole	Crime	
My Sister and I	Harold Huth	Sally Ann Howes, Dermot Walsh	Drama	
No Orchids for Miss Blandish	St. John Legh Clowes	Linden Travers, Jack La Rue	Crime	
No Room at the Inn	Daniel Birt	Freda Jackson, Ann Stephens	Drama	
Noose	Edmond T. Gréville	Carole Landis, Derek Farr	Crime	
Nothing Venture	John Baxter	Patric Curwen, Wilfrid Caithness	Comedy	
Oliver Twist	David Lean	Alec Guinness, Robert Newton, Kay Walsh, John Howard Davies	Literary drama	Number 46 in the list of BFI Top 100 British films
One Night with You	Terence Young	Nino Martini, Patricia Roc	Musical	
Penny and the Pownall Case	Slim Hand	Peggy Evans, Diana Dors	Drama	
A Piece of Cake	John Irwin	Cyril Fletcher, Betty Astell	Comedy	
Portrait from Life	Terence Fisher	Mai Zetterling, Robert Beatty	Drama	
Quartet	Ken Annakin, Arthur Crabtree, Harold French, Ralph Smart	Cecil Parker, Dirk Bogarde, George Cole	Anthology	Adaptation of four short stories by W. Somerset Maugham
The Red Shoes	Michael Powell, Emeric Pressburger	Moira Shearer, Anton Walbrook, Marius Goring	Drama	Number 9 in the list of BFI Top 100 British films. Winner of two Academy Awards
River Patrol	Ben R. Hart	John Blythe, Wally Patch	Crime	
Saraband for Dead Lovers	Basil Dearden	Joan Greenwood, Stewart Granger	Historical drama	
Scott of the Antarctic	Charles Frend	John Mills, James Robertson Justice, Barry Letts	Adventure/biopic	
Sleeping Car to Trieste	John Paddy Carstairs	Jean Kent, Albert Lieven	Thriller	
The Small Voice	Fergus McDonell	Valerie Hobson, James Donald, Howard Keel	Drama/thriller	
Snowbound	David MacDonald	Dennis Price, Mila Parély, Stanley Holloway	Thriller	
So Evil My Love	Lewis Allen	Ray Milland, Ann Todd, Geraldine Fitzgerald	Thriller	
The Small Back Room	Michael Powell, Emeric Pressburger	David Farrar, Kathleen Byron, Jack Hawkins	World War II	
Somewhere in Politics	John E. Blakeley	Frank Randle, Tessie O'Shea	Comedy	
A Song for Tomorrow	Terence Fisher	Evelyn Maccabe, Ralph Michael	Drama	
Spring in Park Lane	Herbert Wilcox	Anna Neagle, Michael Wilding	Romantic Comedy	
The Story of Shirley Yorke	Maclean Rogers	Derek Farr, Dinah Sheridan	Crime	
This Was a Woman	Tim Whelan	Sonia Dresdel, Walter Fitzgerald	Crime	
The Three Weird Sisters	Daniel Birt	Nancy Price, Mary Clare, Raymond Lovell	Melodrama	Screenplay by Dylan Thomas
Trouble in the Air	Charles Saunders	Freddie Frinton, Jimmy Edwards	Comedy	
Uneasy Terms	Vernon Sewell	Michael Rennie, Moira Lister	Thriller	
Vice Versa	Peter Ustinov	Roger Livesey, Anthony Newley	Comedy	
Waverley Steps	John Eldridge		Documentary	
The Weaker Sex	Roy Ward Baker	Ursula Jeans, Cecil Parker	Drama	
When You Come Home	John Baxter	Frank Randle, Leslie Sarony	Comedy	
Who Killed Van Loon?	Lionel Tomlinson	Raymond Lovell, Kay Bannerman	Crime	
William Comes to Town	Val Guest	William Graham, Garry Marsh, Jane Welsh	Comedy	
The Winslow Boy	Anthony Asquith	Robert Donat, Margaret Leighton, Cedric Hardwicke	Drama	Adapted from the play by Terence Rattigan; filmed again in 1999
Woman Hater	Terence Young	Stewart Granger, Edwige Feuillère, Ronald Squire	Romantic comedy	

== See also ==
- 1948 in British music
- 1948 in British television
- 1948 in the United Kingdom
