= Guardia, guardia scelta, brigadiere e maresciallo =

1956 film

- Directed by: Mauro Bolognini
- Written by: Vittorio Metz; Rodolfo Sonego; Roberto Gianviti
- Cinematography: Alvaro Mancori
- Music by: Piero Piccioni
- Release date: 1956
- Country: Italy
- Language: Italian

Guardia, guardia scelta, brigadiere e maresciallo is a 1956 Italian comedy film directed by Mauro Bolognini.

== Cast ==
- Aldo Fabrizi: Brigadiere Pietro Spaziani
- Alberto Sordi: Alberto Randolfi
- Peppino De Filippo: Giuseppe Manganiello
- Gino Cervi: Maresciallo
- Nino Manfredi: Paolo
- Valeria Moriconi: Maria
- Tiberio Mitri: Sandro
- Edoardo Nevola: Tonino
- Alessandra Panaro: Charlotte
- Lydia Johnson: Beba
- Memmo Carotenuto: Ugo
- Oscar Blando: Nino
- Mino Doro: Giacomo
- Riccardo Garrone: Enrico
- Anita Durante: Adriana
- Mario Brega : Strinati's sparring-partner boxer
