= Franco Enriquez =

Italian stage, opera and television director (1927–1980)

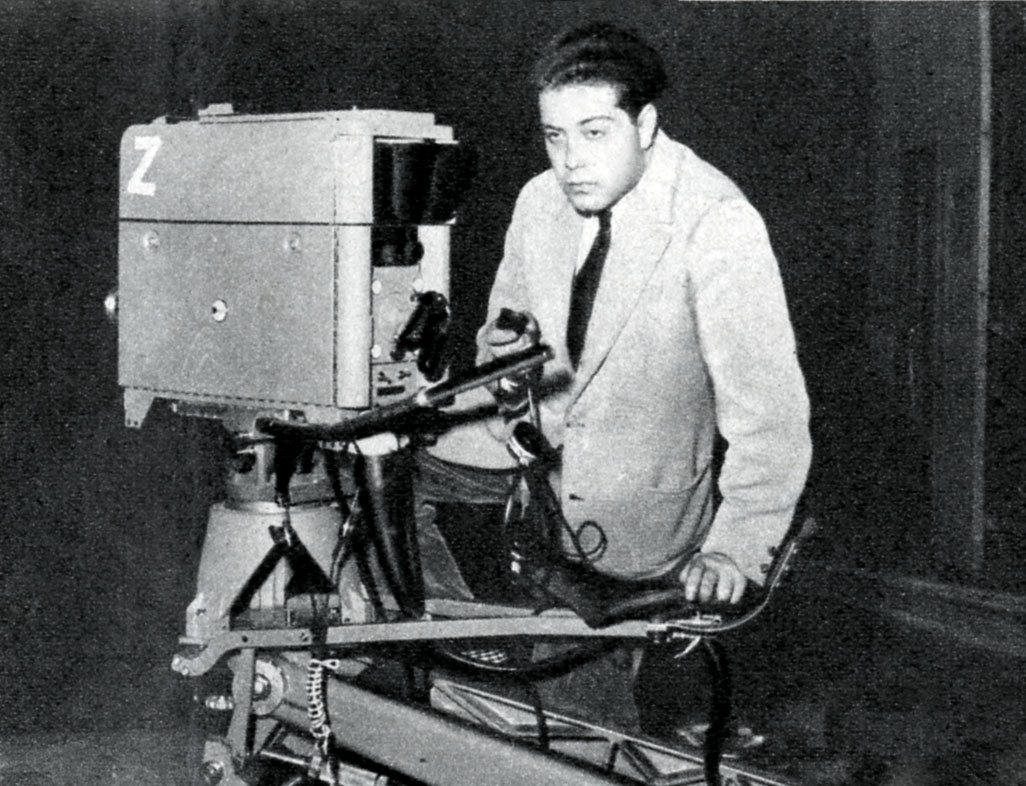
- Enriquez in RAI television studios (Radiocorriere magazine, 1955)
- Born: Gianfranco Enriquez; 20 November 1927; Florence, Kingdom of Italy
- Died: 30 August 1980 (aged 52); Ancona, Italy
- Occupation: Director

Gianfranco "Franco" Enriquez (20 November 1927 – 30 August 1980) was an Italian stage, opera and television director.

== Life and career ==
Born in Florence, Enriquez was the son of conductor Vittorio Gui and musician Elda Solaroli. In the late 1940s, while being a student of Italian literature at the University of Florence, he became assistant director of Giorgio Strehler and later of Luchino Visconti. In 1951, he made his directorial debut with an adaptation of the George Bernard Shaw's drama Caesar and Cleopatra, played by the Ricci-Magni stage company at the Teatro Eliseo in Rome. He made his opera debut one year later, directing Maria Callas in Vincenzo Bellini's Norma.

Starting from 1954, Enriquez was also very active on television, specializing in adaptations of stage works, notably Shakespeare's Romeo and Juliet and Antony and Cleopatra. In 1961, he co-founded the successful and critically acclaimed theatrical company "Compagnia dei quattro" ("Company of the Four") with Valeria Moriconi (with whom he started a relationship that lasted until his death), Glauco Mauri and Mario Scaccia. He later became artistic director of the Teatro Stabile di Torino and then of the Teatro Stabile di Roma, and in 1968 he co-wrote with Franco Cuomo and directed one of the first Italian works inspired by the Protests of 1968, the drama play Discorso per la lettera a una professoressa della scuola di Barbiana e la rivolta degli studenti ("Speech for the letter to a teacher from the Barbiana school and the students' revolt").

Diagnosed with severe liver dysfunction, Enriquez died on 30 August 1980 at the age of 52.
