= The Boatman of Amalfi =

1954 film

- Directed by: Mino Roli
- Written by: Francesco Mastriani (novel); Mino Roli; Roberto Zerboni
- Starring: Mario Vitale; Franca Marzi; Guido Celano
- Cinematography: Massimo Sallusti
- Music by: Carlo Innocenzi
- Production company: SIM
- Distributed by: Regionale distribuzione
- Release date: 29 December 1954
- Running time: 88 minutes
- Country: Italy
- Language: Italian

The Boatman of Amalfi (Italian: Il barcaiolo di Amalfi) is a 1954 Italian melodrama film directed by Mino Roli and starring Mario Vitale, Franca Marzi and Guido Celano. The film's sets were designed by the art director Massimiliano Capriccioli. It is based on the 1883 novel of the same title by Francesco Mastriani.

== Cast ==
- Mario Vitale as Aspreno Selva
- Franca Marzi as Cristina
- Guido Celano as Antonio Selva
- Leda Gloria as Rita Selva
- Fiorella Ferrero as Mery
- Margherita Bagni as Serafina
- Luigi Cimara as Sir White - the consul
- Oscar Blando as Toto'
- Valeria Moriconi as Martina
- Alessandra Panaro
- Roberto Bruni as Don Costanzo
- Augusto Di Giovanni as Avv. difensore
- Nino Marchesini
- Filippo Scelzo as Padre Felice
- Aldo Sprovieri as Il commissario

== Bibliography ==
- Lancia, Enrico. Dizionario del cinema italiano : testi e strumenti per la scuola e l'università. Gli artisti : Vol. 3, Gli attori dal 1930 ai giorni nostri. Gremese Editore, 2003.
