= Julian Orde =

English poet, writer and actor (1917–1974)

Julian Orde (31 December 1917 – 1974) was a female English poet, writer and actor.

== Family background ==
Orde was the eldest child of war artist Cuthbert Orde and Lady Eileen Wellesley, daughter of the 4th Duke of Wellington. The name Julian had been common in the Orde family for generations, for boys and girls.

== Life and work ==
In the 1940s, she was the girlfriend of poet WS Graham. She played Bessie in a 1946 TV version of Aimee Stuart’s Jeannie (not to be confused with the 1941 movie version), and co-wrote the 1948 British movie thriller The Small Voice.

She had poems included in Kenneth Rexroth's 1948 anthology The New British Poets, in whose biographical notes - as well as claiming to be a couple of years younger - she says she 'was on the stage for six years, but now writes for films and radio'. Her 1946 poem The Changing Wind was included in the 1968 Penguin anthology Poetry of the Forties.

She married Ralph Abercrombie in London in 1949. She published poetry afterwards under name Julian Orde Abercrombie. In 1963 she wrote an episode of ATV’s Drama '63 series entitled The Lady And The Clerk.

== Death and legacy ==
Her death, in 1974 aged 56, moved fellow poet David Wright to compose On A Friend Dying. Her work continues to be read and republished. In 1988 her poem Conjurors was republished in its own pamphlet. The Florist was included in the 1995 anthology The Supernatural Index. Conjurors was again republished in the 2010 anthology A Field of Large Desires.
