= Valeria Moriconi =

Italian actress (1931–2005)

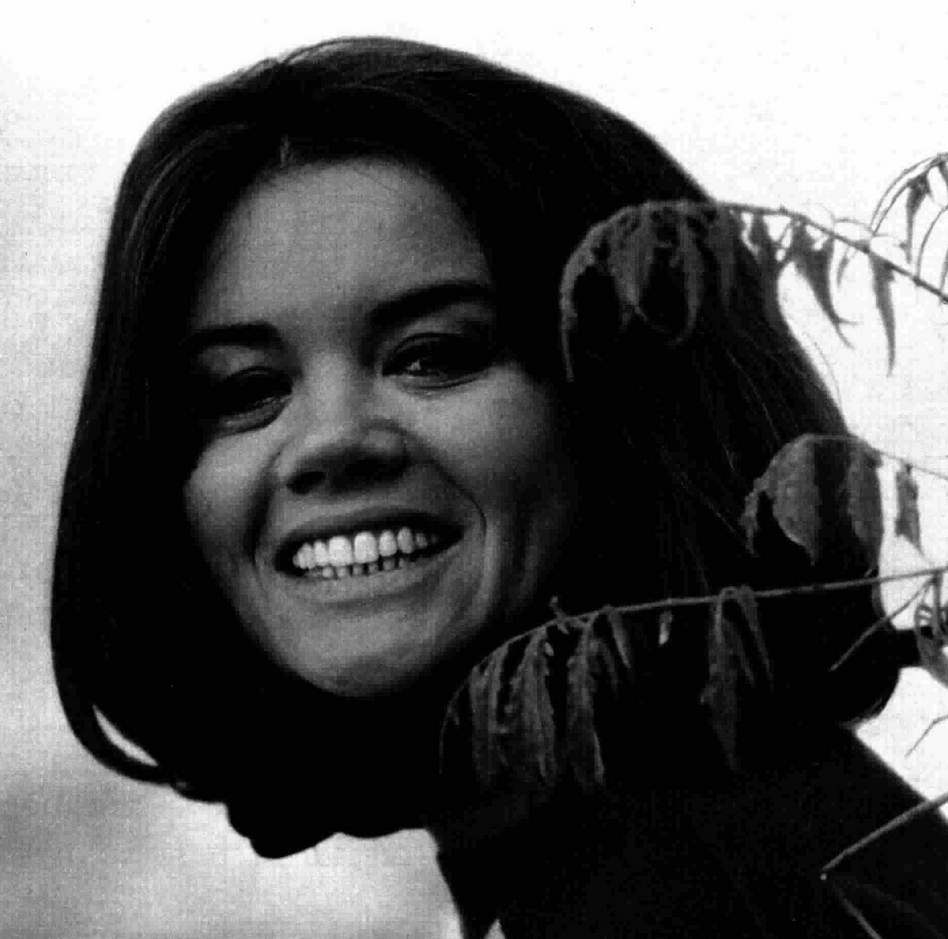
- Born: Valeria Abbruzzetti; 15 November 1931; Iesi, Ancona, Kingdom of Italy
- Died: 15 June 2005 (aged 73); Iesi, Italy
- Occupation: Actress
- Years active: 1953–2005
- Spouse: Aldo Moriconi (m. 1951; div. 1963)

Valeria Moriconi (née Abbruzzetti; November 15, 1931 – June 15, 2005) was an Italian actress who appeared both in movies and on stage.

== Biography ==
Valeria was born in Iesi, in Marche, central Italy. Her earliest work was as a stage actress. She was very young when she acted in an art company, but success came with the movies Gli Italiani si voltano and La Spiaggia. She won the Grolla d'oro award for Le soldatesse. She performed on stage in several plays at the Arlecchino Theater (now Flaiano), from Girotondo by Schnitzler and Per un amore a Roma by Patti to Arialda by Testori and directed by Luchino Visconti.

In the 1960s she met director Franco Enriquez and left her husband, Aldo Moriconi, for him. After Enriquez's death she loved Vittorio Spiga, a journalist from Bologna, and at her death he was at her bedside.

The president of the Italian Republic, Oscar Luigi Scalfaro, nominated her Great Master of the Republic.

In 2000, she was the voice for the Pope's comments during the Via Crucis. In 1999, she received the Renato Simoni award. She worked until she died after suffering from bone cancer on June 15, 2005

== Filmography ==
- It's Never Too Late (1953, of Filippo Walter Ratti) - Marta
- Neapolitan Turk (1953, of Mario Mattòli) - Una bagnante
- Love in the City (1953, of Alberto Lattuada) - (segment "Italiani si voltano, Gli")
- The Beach (1954, of Alberto Lattuada) - Gughi - l'esistenzialista
- High School (1954, of Luciano Emmer) - Girl at the Dance Party (uncredited)
- Miseria e nobiltà (1954, of Mario Mattòli) - Pupella
- Naples Is Always Naples (1954, of Armando Fizzarotti) - Doris
- Loves of Three Queens (1954, of Marc Allégret and Edgar G. Ulmer) - (Segment: The Face That Launched a Thousand Ships) (uncredited)
- The Boatman of Amalfi (1954, of Mino Roli) - Martina
- I cavalieri dell'illusione (1954, of Marc Allégret)
- Loves of Three Queens (1954, of Marc Allégret)
- The Best Part (1955, of Yves Allégret) - Odette - la serveuse de la cantine
- Wild Love (1956, of Mauro Bolognini) - Marisa
- Guardia, guardia scelta, brigadiere e maresciallo (1956, of Mauro Bolognini) - Maria Spaziani - Pietro's Daughter
- Totò lascia o raddoppia? (1956, of Camillo Mastrocinque) - Elsa Marini
- I giorni più belli (1956, of Mario Mattòli) - Silvana
- Una voce una chitarra e un po' di luna (1956, of Giacomo Gentilomo) - Maria
- I miliardari (1956, of Guido Malatesta)
- Le belle dell'aria (1957, of Eduardo Manzanos Brochero)
- I dritti (1957, of Mario Amendola) - Tosca
- The Warrior and the Slave Girl (1958, of Vittorio Cottafavi) - Serva (uncredited)
- L'amore nasce a Roma (1958, of Mario Amendola) - Silvia
- Las aeroguapas (1958, of Eduardo Manzanos Brochero)
- I ragazzi dei Parioli (1959, of Sergio Corbucci) - Grazia
- Le cameriere (1959, of Carlo Ludovico Bragaglia) - Gabriella Calcinetto
- Lui, lei e il nonno (1959, of Anton Giulio Majano) - Tracy
- Il terrore dell'Oklahoma (1959, of Mario Amendola) - Shirley
- A Day for Lionhearts (1961, of Nanni Loy) - Moglie di Orlando
- On the Tiger's Back (1961, of Luigi Comencini) - Ileana Rossi
- Ultimatum alla vita (1962, of Renato Polselli) - Anna
- La costanza della ragione (1964, of Pasquale Festa Campanile) Giuditta
- The Camp Followers (1965, of Valerio Zurlini) - Ebe Bartolini
- Rose Spot (1970, of Enzo Muzii)
- The Profiteer (1974, of Sergio Nasca) - Baroness Clotilde Bezzi
- Calamo (1975, of Massimo Pirri) - Stefania
- Per amore di Cesarina (1976, of Vittorio Sindoni) - Elvira Camporesi
- Strange Occasion (1976, of Nanni Loy) - Giobatta's wife (segment "Italian Superman")
- Che notte quella notte! (1977, of Ghigo De Chiara) - Norma
- Improvviso (1979, of Edith Bruck) - La zia Luisa
- The End Is Known (1993, of Cristina Comencini) - Elvira Delogu
- The Power of the Past (2002, of Piergiorgio Gay) - Madre di Gianni (final film role)

=== Television ===
- I grandi camaleonti (1964, by Edmo Fenoglio) - Godelieve
- Resurrezione (1965, by Franco Enriquez) - Katiuscia
- La locandiera (1966, TV Movie, of Franco Enriquez) - Mirandolina
- Macbeth (1976, TV Movie, by Franco Enriquez) - Lady Macbeth
- Origins of the Mafia (1976, by Enzo Muzii, Episode: "La speranza") - Isabella Mieli
- Viaggio a Goldonia (1982, by Ugo Gregoretti)
- Chéri (1988, TV Movie, by Enzo Muzii) - Lea
