= Bernard Drubay =

French sailor (born 1948)

Bernard Drubay (born 19 July 1948) is a French sailor who competed in the 1972 Summer Olympics.
