= National Board of Review Awards 1951 =

Annual US film awards ceremony

23rd National Board of Review Awards

December 17, 1951

The 23rd National Board of Review Awards were announced on December 17, 1951.

== Top Ten Films ==
1. A Place in the Sun
2. The Red Badge of Courage
3. An American in Paris
4. Death of a Salesman
5. Detective Story
6. A Streetcar Named Desire
7. Decision Before Dawn
8. Strangers on a Train
9. Quo Vadis
10. Fourteen Hours

== Top Foreign Films ==
1. Rashomon
2. The River
3. Miracle in Milan
4. Kon-Tiki
5. The Browning Version

== Winners ==
- Best Film: A Place in the Sun
- Best Foreign Film: Rashomon
- Best Actor: Richard Basehart (Fourteen Hours)
- Best Actress: Jan Sterling (The Big Carnival)
- Best Director: Akira Kurosawa (Rashomon)
- Best Screenplay: T.E.B. Clarke (The Lavender Hill Mob)
