= Oscar Blando =

Italian actor (1924–1994)

- Born: 7 February 1924; Rome, Lazio, Italy
- Died: 20 April 1994 (aged 70); Capri, Italy
- Occupation: Actor
- Years active: 1948-1956 (film)

Oscar Blando (1924–1994) was an Italian film actor. He made his debut after being cast in Renato Castellani's neorealist film Under the Sun of Rome in 1948. The following year he played the lead in Twenty Years, again alongside actress Liliana Mancini. His brief stardom coincided with neorealist attempts to replace the traditional star system by casting more ordinary figures drawn from the public. However he appeared in only a few more productions, in more minor roles.

== Selected filmography ==
- Under the Sun of Rome (1948)
- Twenty Years (1949)
- Terminal Station (1953)
- Matrimonial Agency (1953)
- The Boatman of Amalfi (1954)
- Wild Love (1955)
- Guardia, guardia scelta, brigadiere e maresciallo (1956)

== Bibliography ==
- Enrico Lancia. Dizionario del cinema italiano: Gli atori, Volume I. Gremese Editore, 2003.
