= Miracle in Milan =

1951 film by Vittorio De Sica

- Theatrical release poster
- Italian: Miracolo a Milano
- Directed by: Vittorio De Sica
- Screenplay by: Cesare Zavattini; Vittorio De Sica; Suso Cecchi d'Amico; Mario Chiari; Adolfo Franci
- Based on: Totò il buono a 1943 novel by Cesare Zavattini
- Produced by: Vittorio De Sica
- Starring: Emma Gramatica; Paolo Stoppa; Francesco Golisano; Brunella Bovo
- Cinematography: G. R. Aldo
- Edited by: Eraldo Da Roma
- Music by: Alessandro Cicognini
- Production companies: Produzioni De Sica; Ente Nazionale Industrie Cinematografiche (ENIC)
- Distributed by: ENIC (Italy); Joseph Burstyn Inc. (US)
- Release date: February 8, 1951 (Italy)
- Running time: 96 minutes
- Country: Italy
- Languages: Italian; Milanese

Miracle in Milan (Italian: Miracolo a Milano) is a 1951 Italian fantasy comedy film directed by Vittorio De Sica. The screenplay was co-written by Cesare Zavattini and De Sica, based on Zavattini's 1943 novel Totò il Buono. Told as a neo-realist fable, the film depicts the lives of a poverty-stricken group in post-WWII Milan, Italy, led by Totò, a kind and cheerful orphan. The film stars Francesco Golisano as Totò, alongside an ensemble cast that includes Emma Gramatica, Paolo Stoppa, Guglielmo Barnabò, and Brunella Bovo.

In 2008, Miracle in Milan was included on the Italian Ministry of Cultural Heritage's list of 100 Italian films to be saved, a list of 100 films that "have changed the collective memory of the country between 1942 and 1978."

== Plot ==
Lolotta, a kind old woman, discovers a baby in her cabbage patch and adopts the boy, who she names Totò. She teaches him things like math, but also instills him with joy and wonder, and they live together happily until he is 11, when Lolotta dies. Totò is sent to an orphanage, where he stays until reaching adulthood. Cast out alone into the cold Milanese winter, Totò, who has not lost his openhearted optimism, winds up settling in a shantytown on the outskirts of the city.

Totò's presence initiates a transformation in the shantytown, and soon it begins to become a real community, with the inhabitants working together to build sturdier and more elaborate structures along named streets surrounding a central square. New arrivals are welcomed, and the community grows. One day, Brambi and Mobbi, two wealthy businessmen, come to look at the plot of land on which the squatters are living, as Mobbi is considering purchasing it from Brambi. Totò invites them to warm their hands at a small fire, and an uncomfortable Mobbi, who does not like Brambi's price for the land anyway, makes a speech saying the squatters should not have to move, and that they are all brothers. The squatters cheer Mobbi as he and Brambi beat a hasty retreat.

During a celebration, as a hole is being dug for a maypole, oil is discovered beneath the shantytown, though the residents initially mistake the clear liquid for water. Rappi, a scheming resident who does not get along with his neighbors, alerts Mobbi in exchange for a reward, and Mobbi promptly purchases the land and sends one of his employees to tell the squatters to leave. The residents drive the man away, and Totò brings the leaders of the settlement to talk with Mobbi, as he believes the magnate's earlier speech was sincere.

While he delays the leadership of the shantytown in his office, Mobbi sends his personal police force to begin the evictions, and Totò and his comrades return to discover their neighbors defeated. They lead a charge that pushes back the officers, but then Mobbi arrives with more forces, and the residents are driven back against the railroad tracks by smoke bombs. Totò climbs the maypole and waves his handkerchief as a white flag, but, just then, the ghostly spirit of Lolotta comes down from the sky and gives him a magical dove, saying it will allow him to do whatever he wants, before she flies off, chased by two angels.

Using the dove, Totò drives away Mobbi and his troops. His neighbors have noticed the miraculous occurrences, however, and they start to ask him for things. Some requests are practical, and many are not, but he does not discriminate, and spends the next several hours granting as many wishes as he can.

With difficulty, Totò eventually slips away to talk with Edvige, a young woman with whom he is smitten. She is initially frightened of him, but he denies there is anything magical or holy about him, and she gradually relaxes. All she can think to ask for is a new pair of shoes, but, after they kiss, Totò offers to give Edvige the Sun. As they watch it rise (after having set not long before), the angels take back the dove.

Unfortunately, Mobbi's regrouped troops made a plan to attack at sunrise. They storm into the shantytown and quickly overrun the residents and herd them into police wagons. Edvige evades capture and finds a dove, which she hurries to bring to Totò, handing him the bird through the bars just as the squatters are being taken past Milan's central square. It is just an ordinary dove, but Lolotta almost immediately appears and swaps it for the magical one, which she has retrieved from the angels, who then take her and the ordinary dove up to heaven.

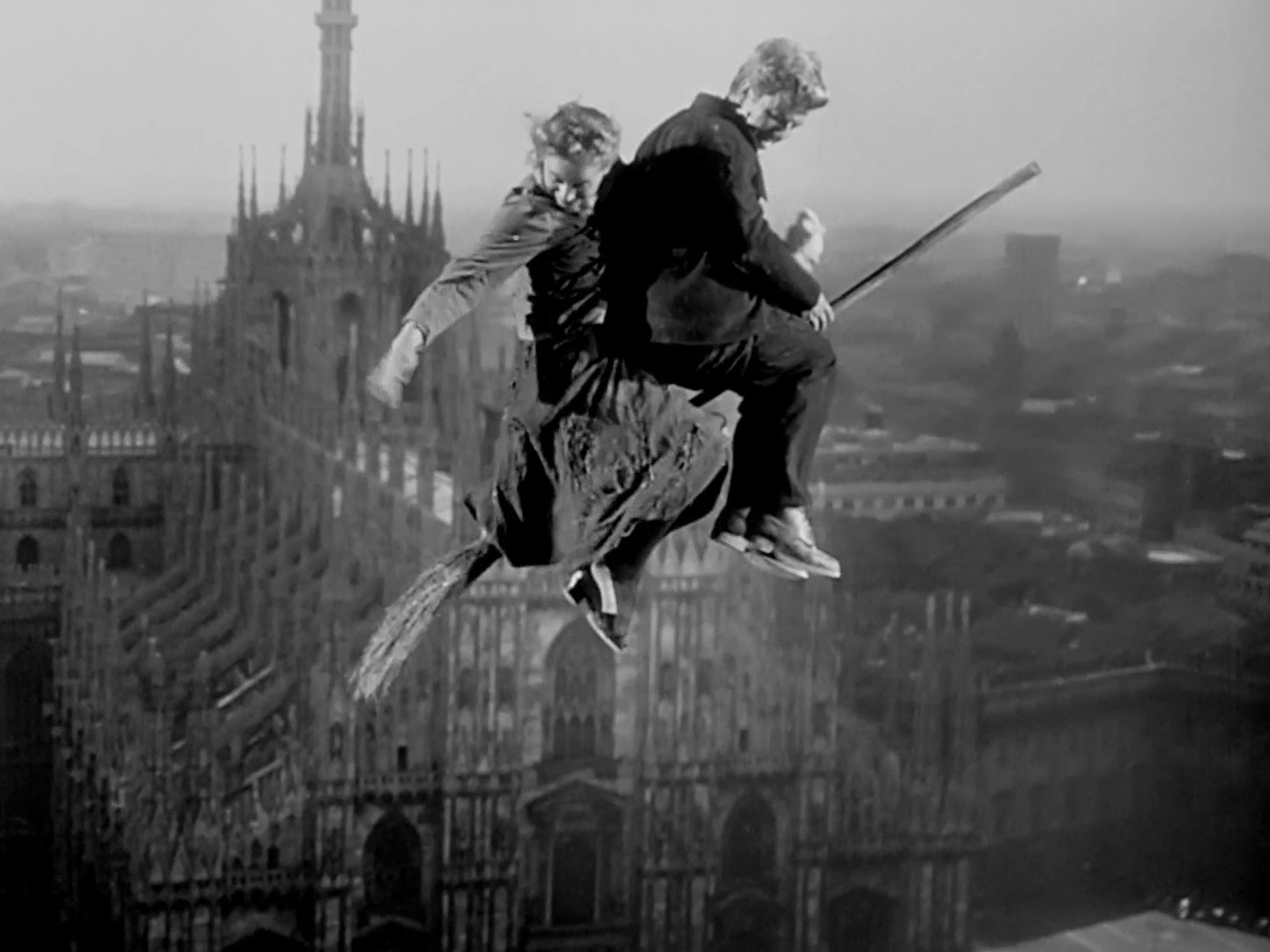
A still from the final scene, the escape on broomstick

Totò makes the police wagons fall apart and yells for the squatters to grab broomsticks from the workers sweeping the square. They take off, flying over the Milan Cathedral on their way "towards a land where 'good morning' really means 'good morning'!"

== Cast ==
- Emma Gramatica as Lolotta, the elderly woman who raises Totò
- Francesco Golisano as Totò, a kind and cheerful orphan
  - Gianni Branduani as Totò at 11 (uncredited)
- Paolo Stoppa as Rappi, the scheming homeless man
- Guglielmo Barnabò as Mobbi, the wealthy businessman who buys the property
- Brunella Bovo as Edvige, Marta's maid and Toto's sweetheart
- Anna Carena as Marta, the aristocratic, but now homeless, Signora Altezzosa
- Alba Arnova as the statue that comes to life
- Flora Cambi as the homeless Italian woman kept separate from her love, an African-American man
- Virgilio Riento as the sergeant in Mobbi's police force who enters the shantytown and makes a wish
- Arturo Bragaglia as Alfredo, the homeless man who brings Totò to the shantytown
- Erminio Spalla as Gaetano, a large homeless man
- Riccardo Bertazzolo as Giovanni, the large homeless man who wears a hat
- Francesco Rissone as the second-in-command of Mobbi's police force
- Angelo Prioli as the commander of Mobbi's police force
- Jerome Johnson as the homeless African-American man kept separate from his love, an Italian woman (uncredited)
- Enzo Furlai as Brambi, the wealthy businessman who initially owns the property (uncredited)

== Production ==
De Sica wrote that he made the film in order to show how the "common man" can exist, given the realities of life: "It is true that my people have already attained happiness after their own fashion; precisely because they are destitute, these people still feel – as the majority of ordinary men perhaps no longer do – the living warmth of a ray of winter sunshine, the simple poetry of the wind. They greet water with the same pure joy as Saint Francis did." In neo-realist fashion, De Sica used both professional and non-professional actors in the film.

The film's principal location was a wasteland near Milan's Lambrate railway station. The Milan Cathedral serves as the location of the finale, and can be viewed as symbolic of the miracle to which the film's title refers.

American special effects specialist Ned Mann was hired to work on the film.

== Reception ==
=== Critical response ===
Miracle in Milan premiered in Italy on 8 February 1951, before it was presented at the Cannes Film Festival on April 11. It opened in the United States on 17 December.

Bosley Crowther, film critic for The New York Times, liked the film, saying: "The rich vein of sly, compassionate humor that Charlie Chaplin and René Clair used to mine with unparalleled genius when they were turning out their best satiric films, has been tapped by Vittorio De Sica in his Miracle in Milan, the widely proclaimed Italian picture that arrived at the World yesterday. And although this uncommon vein of fancy is away from De Sica's previous line, the great director has brought up from his digging a liberal return of purest gold." The staff at Variety magazine also gave the film a positive review, writing: "The sharp satire on the oil-greedy industrialist is handled in a broader, perhaps exaggerated manner, and pic is liberally sprinkled with intelligent humor, much of it ironic. Performances by pros and tyros alike are flawless." The film ranked 3rd on the first of Cahiers du Cinéma's lists of the top 10 films of the year.

On the review aggregator website Rotten Tomatoes, 92% of 14 critics' reviews of the film are positive. Metacritic, which uses a weighted average, assigned the film a score of 78 out of 100, based on 8 critics, indicating "generally favorable" reviews.

In April 2019, a restored version of the film was selected to be shown in the Cannes Classics section at that year's Cannes Film Festival.

=== Awards ===
Wins

- 1951 Cannes Film Festival: Grand Prize of the Festival – Vittorio De Sica
- 1951 Nastro d'Argento Awards: Best Production Design – Guido Fiorini
- 1951 New York Film Critics Circle Awards: Best Foreign Language Film – Miracle in Milan (Italy)
- 1951 National Board of Review Awards: Top Foreign Films

Nominations

- 6th British Academy Film Awards: Best Film from Any Source – Miracle in Milan (Italy); Best Foreign Actor – Francesco Golisano (Italy)
