= Wild Love (film) =

1955 film

- Italian release poster
- Directed by: Mauro Bolognini
- Written by: Pasquale Festa Campanile; Massimo Franciosa; Giuseppe Mangione; Mauro Bolognini
- Produced by: Alessandro Jacovoni
- Starring: Antonella Lualdi; Franco Interlenghi
- Cinematography: Massimo Sallusti
- Edited by: Otello Colangeli
- Music by: Carlo Rustichelli
- Release date: 24 December 1955
- Running time: 90 minutes
- Country: Italy
- Language: Italian

Wild Love (Italian: Gli innamorati) is a 1955 Italian drama film directed by Mauro Bolognini. It was entered into the 1956 Cannes Film Festival.

== Cast ==
- Antonella Lualdi as Adriana Latini
- Franco Interlenghi as Franco
- Sergio Raimondi as Nando Latini
- Valeria Moriconi as Marisa
- Nino Manfredi as Otello
- Nadia Bianchi as Alba del Bosco, la diva dei fumetti
- Oscar Blando as Gratta
- Decimo Cristiani as Luciano
- Nino Marino as Aldo
- Alessandra Panaro as Marcella
- Gigi Reder as Annibale
- Toni Ucci (as Tony Ucci)
- Giancarlo Zarfati (as Giancarlo Zarfati)
- Gino Cervi as Cesare Sor
- Cosetta Greco as Ines
