= Il romanzo della mia vita =

- Directed by: Lionello De Felice
- Written by: Luciano Tajoli; Vittorio Nino Novarese; Franco Brusati; Lionello De Felice
- Cinematography: Romolo Garroni
- Edited by: Mario Serandrei
- Music by: Luciano Maraviglia
- Release date: 18 December 1952
- Country: Italy
- Language: Italian

Il romanzo della mia vita is a 1952 Italian biographical melodrama film. It depicts real life events of singer-actor Luciano Tajoli, who plays himself in the film.

== Cast ==
- Luciano Tajoli: Himself
- Antonella Lualdi: Maria
- Fulvia Franco: Clara
- Vittorio Sanipoli: Gianni
- Giulietta Masina: Paola
- Francesco Golisano: Piero
- Guglielmo Inglese: Pasquale Curcio
- Enrico Glori: il presentatore
- Lauro Gazzolo: l'avvocato Marchetti
- Nino Cavalieri: il direttore del teatro Odeon
- Mario Siletti: l'organizzatore dell'Ora del dilettante
- Camillo Pilotto: il commissario
- Enzo Biliotti: il signor Vismara
- Renato Malavasi: il professore del consulto
- Fedele Gentile: Enzo Tajoli
- Rita Livesi: la madre di Luciano
- Armando Annuale: il maestro di pianoforte
- Claudio Ermelli: il custode del teatro
- Mimo Billi: il padre di Paola
- Gildo Bocci: il padrone della trattoria
- Margherita Bossi Nicosia: la padrona della trattoria
- Bruna Corrà: la cameriera di Clara
- Liana Del Balzo: la signora elegante alla trattoria
- Alfredo Rizzo: il ladro
