= Twenty Years (film) =

1950 film

- Film poster
- Directed by: Giorgio Bianchi
- Written by: Gaspare Cataldo; Aldo De Benedetti; Fabrizio Sarazani; Cesare Zavattini
- Starring: Oscar Blando; Francesco Golisano; Liliana Mancini
- Cinematography: Sergio Pesce
- Edited by: Adriana Novelli
- Music by: Gino Filippini
- Production company: A.L.C.E.
- Distributed by: Variety Distribution
- Release date: 1949
- Running time: 95 minutes
- Country: Italy
- Language: Italian

Twenty Years (Italian: Vent'anni) is a 1949 Italian comedy film directed by Giorgio Bianchi and starring Oscar Blando, Francesco Golisano and Liliana Mancini. It was part of the Italian neorealism movement of postwar Italy.

== Plot ==
Two petty thieves plan a much bigger scam than they usually practice, but complications ensue.

== Cast ==
- Oscar Blando as Ciro
- Francesco Golisano as Geppa
- Liliana Mancini as Iris
- Marcella Melnati as Nonna
- Titti Brandani
- Nando Bruno
- Vittoria Crispo
- Checco Durante
- Barbara Leite
- Lamberto Maggiorani
- Marcello Mastroianni
- Lolly Moreno
- Marcella Ruffini

== Bibliography ==
- Enrico Lancia. Dizionario del cinema italiano: Gli atori, Volume I. Gremese Editore, 2003.
