= Una Croce senza nome =

- Italian theatrical release poster
- Directed by: Tullio Covaz
- Written by: Tullio Covaz; Mario Prodan; Cesare Torri
- Cinematography: Carlo Carlini
- Edited by: Otello Colangeli
- Music by: Mario Zafred
- Release date: 1952
- Country: Italy
- Language: Italian

Una Croce senza nome is a 1952 Italian film directed by Tullio Covaz.

== Cast ==
- Carlo Ninchi as Prof. Teofilo
- Michela Roberts (Michela Prodan) as Michela Roberts
- Francesco Golisano as Ughetto
