= 1948 in the United Kingdom =

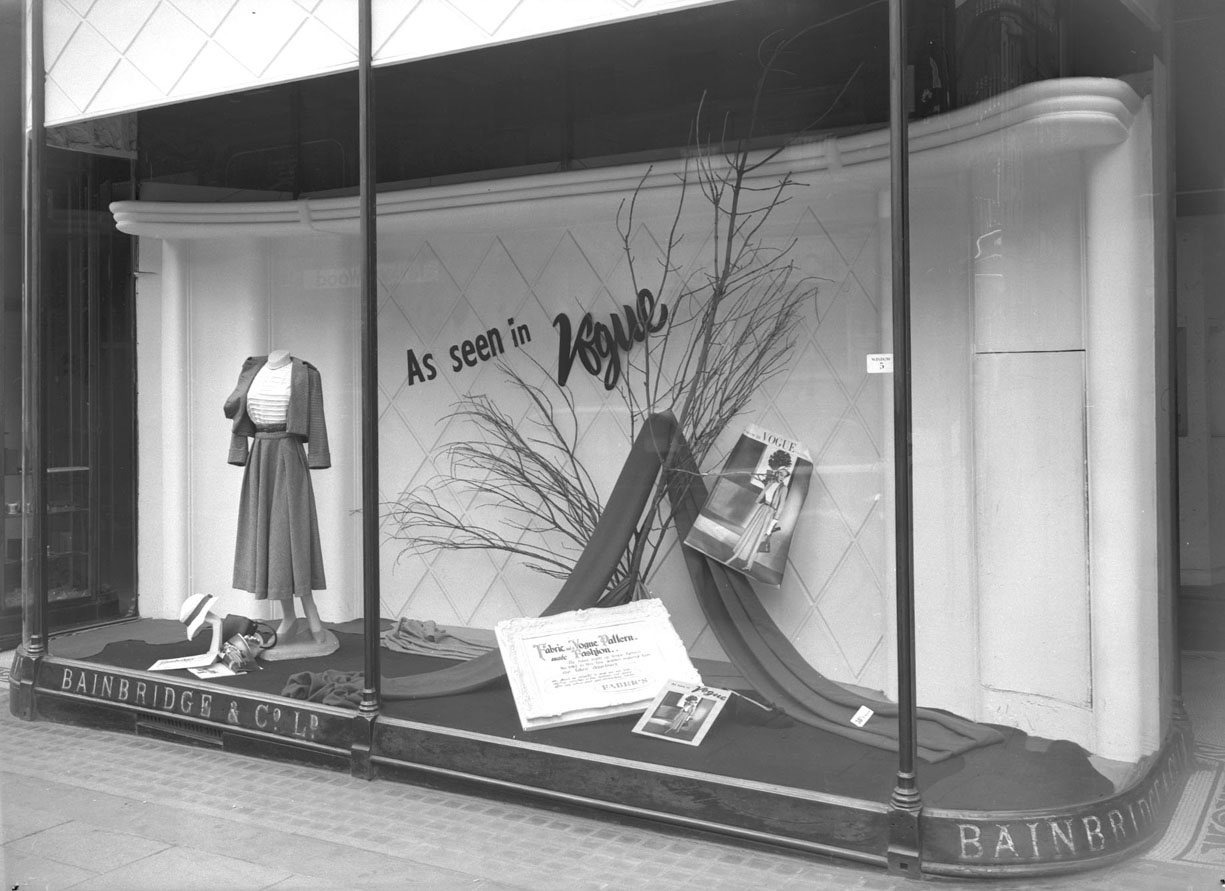

Events from the year 1948 in the United Kingdom. The Olympics are held in London and some of the government's key social legislation takes effect.

== Incumbents ==
- Monarch – George VI
- Prime Minister – Clement Attlee (Labour)

== Events ==
- 1 January
  - British Railways created when the government nationalizes the railway industry.
  - Church Commissioners created to manage Church of England property by merger of assets of the Ecclesiastical Commissioners and Queen Anne's Bounty.
- 4 January – Burma gains its independence from the United Kingdom.
- 5 January – The first episode of the radio serial drama Mrs Dale's Diary is broadcast on the BBC Light Programme.
- 12 January – The London Co-operative Society opens Britain's first supermarket, in Manor Park, London. In the same month, Marks & Spencer introduce self-service in the food department of their Wood Green store and also this year Portsea Island Mutual Co-operative Society opens a self-service supermarket in Portsmouth.
- 17 January – All-time highest attendance for an English Football League game as 83,260 people watch Manchester United draw with Arsenal in a match played at Maine Road.
- 30 January–8 February – Great Britain and Northern Ireland compete at the Winter Olympics in St. Moritz, Switzerland, and win 2 bronze medals.
- 1 February- The Malayan Union is restructured as the Federation of Malaya
- 4 February – Ceylon (later renamed Sri Lanka) becomes independent within the British Commonwealth. George VI becomes King of Ceylon.
- March
  - Trades Union Congress and Government agree a formal policy of voluntary wage restraint.
  - The Administrative Staff College (established in 1945) runs its first courses at Greenlands, Henley-on-Thames, the UK's first business school.
  - The "New Look" in women's fashion becomes available in British stores.
- 17 March – Britain signs the Treaty of Brussels with Belgium, France, Luxembourg and the Netherlands.
- 23 March – The radio comedy Take It From Here, written by Frank Muir and Denis Norden, is first broadcast by the BBC.
- 1 April
  - Nationalisation of the electricity supply industry under terms of the Electricity Act 1947 comes into effect.
  - Fire services in the United Kingdom return from the National Fire Service to control of local authorities (under terms of Fire Services Act 1947).
- 15 April – Rowntree's introduce Polo mint sweets.
- 16 April – Arrival of Australian cricket team in England for a tour in which it will not lose a match.
- 21 April – National Youth Orchestra of Great Britain gives its first concert.
- 24 April – Manchester United F.C. defeat Blackpool 4–2 in the FA Cup final at Wembley Stadium to claim their first major trophy for 37 years.
- 26 April – King George VI and Queen Elizabeth celebrate their silver wedding anniversary with a service at St Paul's Cathedral followed by a 22-mile motor procession around London.
- 30 April – The Land Rover is unveiled at the Amsterdam Motor Show.
- 4 May – Release of Sir Laurence Olivier's film of Shakespeare's Hamlet, which will be the first British film to win the Academy Award for Best Picture.
- 12 May – High Explosive Research, the project agreed last year to develop an independent British atomic bomb, is announced publicly.
- 13 May – National Assistance Act supersedes the old Poor Law system.
- 14 May – The abduction and brutal murder of June Anne Devaney, a three-year-old girl, at a Blackburn hospital leads to the fingerprinting of more than 40,000 men in the town to identify the murderer, Peter Griffiths who on 19 November will be hanged at Walton Gaol, Liverpool, for the crime.
- 14–15 May – At midnight, the British Mandate of Palestine is officially terminated as the state of Israel comes into being.
- June – Professor Lillian Penson becomes the first woman elected to serve as Vice-Chancellor of a British university (London).
- 5–13 June – First Aldeburgh Festival of music.
- 21 June – The Manchester Baby, the world's first electronic stored-program computer, runs its first programme.
- 22 June
  - The ship HMT Empire Windrush arrives at the Port of Tilbury with 802 Jamaican immigrants.
  - An Order in Council removes the title of Emperor of India from the Royal Style and Titles, recognising the independence of India in 1947.
- 1 July
  - The Town and Country Planning Act 1947 and its equivalent in Scotland come into effect as the foundation of modern town and country planning in the United Kingdom, requiring planning permission for land development and establishing the system of Listed buildings.
  - The National Museum of Wales opens the Welsh Folk Museum at St Fagans to the public, the first open-air museum in the UK (director: Iorwerth Peate).
- 4 July – 1948 Northwood mid-air collision: A Scandinavian Airlines Douglas DC-6 and an Avro York of No. 99 Squadron RAF collide over Northwood, London, and crash killing all 39 people aboard both aircraft.
- 5 July
  - The National Health Service begins functioning, giving the right to universal healthcare, free at point of use.
  - Changes to the National Insurance social insurance scheme come into effect.
  - The Children Act 1948 comes into effect, transferring responsibility for child welfare from Poor Law Guardians, Approved schools and voluntary organisations to new local authority Children's Departments with professional Children's Officers.
- 15 July – First London chapter of Alcoholics Anonymous.
- 25 July – End of post-war bread rationing.
- 29 July–14 August – Olympic Games held in London. Great Britain and Northern Ireland win 3 gold, 14 silver and 6 bronze medals at the event which is televised by the BBC.
- 29 July
  - Stoke Mandeville Games are held for the first time, the predecessor of the Paralympic Games.
  - The highest daily mean Central England temperature value up to this date, 25.2 °C (77.4 °F), is recorded for this day.
- 30 July
  - Gas boards are created as the government nationalises the gas industry.
  - Criminal Justice Act 1948 abolishes penal servitude, hard labour and prison divisions in England and Wales and also judicial corporal punishment (birching and flogging) here and in Scotland; abolishes the right of peers to be tried in the House of Lords; and provides for remand centres for defendants aged 18–20 years old, among other significant reforms.
  - Representation of the People Act 1948 amends the law relating to elections, abolishing plural voting.
- 18 August – Jockey Lester Piggott, aged 12, wins his first race, at Haydock Park Racecourse.
- September – The first new comprehensive schools open in Potters Bar and Hillingdon.
- 6 September – Flying the de Havilland DH 108, John Derry becomes the first British pilot to break the sound barrier.
- 8 September – Terence Rattigan's play The Browning Version premieres in London.
- 12 October – Topical debate programme Any Questions? first broadcast on the BBC Home Service. It will still be on the radio more than sixty years later.
- 19 October – The Hoover Company open a new factory for the mass production of washing machines at Merthyr Tydfil which will remain in operation until March 2009.
- 20 October – 1948 KLM Constellation air disaster: a KLM Lockheed Constellation airliner crashes into power cables on approach to Prestwick Airport in Scotland, killing all 40 people on board.
- 27 October–6 November – First postwar Motor Show held at Earls Court, London. A record 562,954 visitors witness a wide range of new products from British manufacturers. Most successful will be the Morris Minor and Land Rover; but there are also the Morris Six, new Morris Oxford and Wolseley 4/50; Jaguar XK120, the world's fastest production car at this time, and Mark V; Hillman Minx Mark III; Austin A70 and Atlantic; Vauxhall Velox and Wyvern; Singer SM1500; Sunbeam-Talbot 90; and Bristol 401.
- November – Snettisham Hoard discovered near King's Lynn.
- 8 November – The King issues Letters Patent granting the title of Prince or Princess of the United Kingdom, with the style Royal Highness, to the children of The Duke of Edinburgh and Princess Elizabeth, Duchess of Edinburgh. Their first child is due later this month.
- 14 November – Princess Elizabeth gives birth to a son at Buckingham Palace.
- 15 November – Rising actor and comedian Ronnie Barker, aged 19 from Bedford, makes his stage debut in the play Quality Street at the County Theatre in Aylesbury, Buckinghamshire.
- December – Patrick Blackett wins the Nobel Prize in Physics "for his development of the Wilson cloud chamber method, and his discoveries therewith in the fields of nuclear physics and cosmic radiation".
- 10 December – T. S. Eliot wins the Nobel Prize in Literature "for his outstanding, pioneer contribution to present-day poetry".
- 15 December – The Duke and Duchess of Edinburgh's one-month-old son is christened His Royal Highness Prince Charles Philip Arthur George of Edinburgh. He becomes Prince of Wales in 1958 and succeeds his mother as King Charles III at age 73, in September 2022.
- 20 December – Scottish advocate Margaret Kidd becomes the first British woman King's Counsel in Britain.
- 26 December – The first series of Reith Lectures, Bertrand Russell on Authority and the Individual, begins broadcasting on the BBC Home Service.

=== Undated ===
- From the end of the year, manufacturers are permitted to make Utility furniture to their own designs.
- "Black widow" road safety poster (slogan: "Keep death off the road – Carelessness kills") by William Little issued.

== Publications ==
- Jocelyn Brooke's semi-autobiographical novel The Military Orchid, first of the Orchid trilogy, and The Scapegoat.
- Agatha Christie's Hercule Poirot novel Taken at the Flood.
- Winston Churchill's The Gathering Storm, first volume of his history The Second World War.
- T. S. Eliot's Notes Towards the Definition of Culture.
- Graham Greene's novel The Heart of the Matter.
- Aldous Huxley's novel Ape and Essence.
- F. R. Leavis's literary criticism The Great Tradition.
- Nevil Shute's novel No Highway.
- Evelyn Waugh's novel The Loved One.
- I-Spy series inaugurated.

== Births ==
- 2 January – Deborah Watling, actress (died 2017)
- 10 January – David Neuberger, Baron Neuberger of Abbotsbury, lawyer and judge
- 12 January
  - Kenny Allen, footballer
  - Anthony Andrews, actor
  - Brendan Foster, Olympic runner and athletics commentator
- 19 January
  - Amanda Holden, writer (died 2021)
  - Mal Reilly, English rugby player and coach
- 20 January – Nigel Williams, author, playwright and screenwriter
- 22 January – Liz Lynne, Liberal Democrat politician
- 24 January – Michael Des Barres, peer, singer-songwriter and actor
- 27 January
  - Kim Gardner, musician (died 2001)
  - Gordon Henderson, Conservative politician
- 30 January
  - Nick Broomfield, director and producer
  - Miles Reid, mathematician and academic
- 2 February
  - Caroline Gipps, university vice-chancellor
  - Roger Williamson, racing driver (died 1973)
  - Dave Clement, footballer (died 1982)
- 5 February – Tom Wilkinson, actor (died 2023)
- 11 February – Roger Mills, race walker
- 13 February – Jim Crawford, Scottish racing driver (died 2002)
- 22 February – Brian Kerr, Baron Kerr of Tonaghmore, judge (died 2020)
- 24 February
  - Peter Mond, 4th Baron Melchett, public servant (died 2018)
  - Walter Smith, Scottish football player and manager (died 2021)
  - Dennis Waterman, actor (died 2022)
- 26 February – David Edgar, playwright
- 1 March – Alison Richard, primatologist and academic
- 5 March
  - Richard Hickox, English orchestral conductor (died 2008)
  - Elaine Paige, singer and actress
- 7 March – Rupert Jackson, judge
- 8 March
  - Gyles Brandreth, broadcaster, writer and politician
  - Mel Galley, guitarist (died 2008)
  - Jonathan Sacks, Chief Rabbi (died 2020)
- 12 March – Virginia Bottomley, politician
- 21 March – Robert Watson, atmospheric chemist
- 22 March – Andrew Lloyd Webber, composer
- 28 March – Matthew Corbett, comedian, scriptwriter and children's show presenter (Sooty)
- 30 March – Mervyn King, Baron King of Lothbury, economist and Governor of the Bank of England
- 1 April
  - Peter Law, Welsh Labour (later independent) politician (died 2006)
  - Paul Myners, Baron Myners, businessman and politician (died 2022)
- 4 April
  - Derek Thompson, Northern Irish actor
  - Pick Withers, drummer
- 12 April
  - Jeremy Beadle, television presenter, writer and producer (died 2008)
  - Ian Richards, English race walker
- 13 April – Brian Griffin, photographer (died 2024)
- 16 April – Anita Carey, actress (died 2023)
- 17 April – John Gray, philosopher
- 18 April – Kevin Finnegan, English boxer (died 2008)
- 20 April – Hugh Roberts, English historian and curator
- 21 April – Alan West, Baron West of Spithead, admiral and politician, Minister for Security
- 26 April – Alan Haworth, Baron Haworth, politician (died 2023)
- 28 April – Terry Pratchett, comic fantasy and science fiction author (died 2015)
- 3 May
  - Denis Cosgrove, geographer (died 2008)
  - Peter Oosterhuis, golfer (died 2024)
- 5 May – Bill Ward, rock drummer
- 12 May – Joe Tasker, mountaineer (died 1982)
- 15 May – Brian Eno, synthesizer virtuoso and ambient music composer/producer
- 29 May – Linda Esther Gray, soprano
- 31 May – John Bonham, rock drummer (Led Zeppelin) (died 1980)
- 1 June – Joe Andrew, author and academic
- 4 June – Bob Champion, jump jockey
- 19 June – Barry Hearn, accountant and businessman
- 21 June – Ian McEwan, novelist
- 13 July - Richard Avent, archaeologist and conservationist (died 2006)
- 14 July – Eliza Manningham-Buller, Head of MI5 and life peer
- 17 July – Wayne Sleep, dancer and choreographer
- 21 July – Cat Stevens, singer-songwriter
- 24 July – Michael Coveney, English author and critic
- 27 July – Stephen Westaby, cardiac surgeon
- 5 August – Ray Clemence, football goalkeeper (died 2020)
- 8 August – Wincey Willis, broadcaster (died 2024)
- 20 August
  - Bill Griffiths, poet and scholar (died 2007)
  - Robert Plant, singer and lyricist (Led Zeppelin)
- 1 September – Alastair Redfern, bishop
- 16 September – Julia Donaldson, writer and playwright
- 17 September – Aidan Nichols, Dominican priest and academic
- 19 September – Jeremy Irons, actor
- 26 September
  - John Foxx, singer-songwriter, guitarist and keyboard player
  - Olivia Newton-John, singer (died 2022 in the United States)
- 27 September – Michele Dotrice, actress
- 29 September
  - Ross Benson, journalist (died 2005)
  - Jack Dromey, politician (died 2022)
- 2 October – Trevor Brooking, footballer
- 3 October – Ian MacDonald, music critic (died 2003)
- 6 October – Gerry Adams, Irish Republican politician
- 9 October
  - Ciaran Carson, Northern Irish poet and novelist (died 2019)
  - Oliver Hart, economist, recipient of the Nobel Memorial Prize in Economic Sciences
- 10 October
  - Sue Campbell, Baroness Campbell of Loughborough, sports administrator
  - Simon Lindley, musician (died 2025)
- 11 October – David Rendall, operatic tenor (died 2025)
- 12 October – Rick Parfitt, rock musician (Status Quo) (died 2016)
- 15 October – Chris de Burgh, musician
- 24 October
  - Phil Bennett, Welsh rugby union player (died 2022)
  - Dale Griffin, drummer (died 2016)
- 3 November – Lulu, born Marie McDonald McLaughlin Lawrie, Scottish singer and entertainer
- 14 November
  - King Charles III
  - Paul Dacre, journalist
- 23 November – Frank Worthington, footballer (died 2021)
- 25 November – Paul Murphy, Welsh Labour politician
- 1 December
  - Geraint Davies, Welsh politician
  - Neil Warnock, football player and manager
- 2 December – Patricia Hewitt, Labour politician
- 3 December
  - Maxwell Hutchinson, architect and broadcaster
  - Ozzy Osbourne, English heavy metal singer (died 2025)
- 8 December – Laurence Marks, screenwriter
- 9 December – Jonathan Sumption, Lord Sumption, lawyer, judge and historian
- 13 December – David May, investigative journalist and editor (died 2019)
- 20 December
  - Alan Parsons, keyboard player and producer
  - Carol Smart, sociologist
- 22 December
  - Mary Archer, scientist
  - Noel Edmonds, disc jockey and television presenter
- 23 December – David Davis, politician
- 24 December – Stan Bowles, footballer (died 2024)
- 29 December – Peter Robinson, First Minister of Northern Ireland
- 30 December – Kim McLagan, fashion model (died 2006)
- 31 December
  - Stephen Cleobury, choral conductor (died 2019)
  - Sandy Jardine, Scottish footballer (died 2014)

== Deaths ==
- 23 January – J. L. Garvin, newspaper editor (born 1868)
- 30 January
  - Nigel De Brulier, British actor (born 1877)
  - Sir Arthur Coningham, Royal Air Force air marshal (disappeared, born 1895)
- 4 February – Edward Stanley, 17th Earl of Derby, soldier, Conservative politician, diplomat, and racehorse owner (born 1865)
- 6 February – John Sankey, 1st Viscount Sankey, lawyer, judge, Labour politician, and Lord Chancellor of Great Britain (born 1866)
- 10 February – Ewart Astill, cricketer (born 1888)
- 29 February – Robert Barrington-Ward, barrister and journalist, editor of The Times since 1941 (born 1891)
- 13 March – Princess Helena Victoria of Schleswig-Holstein, granddaughter of Queen Victoria (born 1870)
- 23 March – George Milne, 1st Baron Milne, Chief of the Imperial General Staff (born 1866)
- 2 May – A. H. Fox Strangways, musicologist, translator, editor, and music critic (born 1859)
- 13 May – Peter Wentworth-Fitzwilliam, 8th Earl Fitzwilliam, soldier and aristocrat (born 1910)
- 29 May – Dame May Whitty, actress (born 1865)
- 21 June – Sir Beachcroft Towse, British Army officer, awarded the Victoria Cross (born 1864)
- 27 July – Woolf Barnato, financier and racing car driver (born 1895)
- 28 July – Fred Spiksley, footballer and coach (born 1870)
- 12 August – Harry Brearley, inventor (born 1871)
- 17 August – Dame Lilian Braithwaite, actress (born 1873)
- 22 August – Sophia Duleep Singh, princess and suffragette (born 1876)
- 3 September – Jack Peart, footballer and manager (born 1888)
- 10 September
  - Bernard Forbes, 8th Earl of Granard, politician (born 1874)
  - Hamar Greenwood, 1st Viscount Greenwood, politician (born 1870)
- 12 September – Rupert D'Oyly Carte, theatre owner and hotelier, son of Richard D'Oyly Carte (born 1876)
- 22 October – Sir William Rylands, businessman and baronet (born 1868)
- 4 November – Albert Stanley, 1st Baron Ashfield, businessman and chairman of the London Passenger Transport Board (1933–1947) (born 1874)
- 24 November – Nellie Wallace, music hall star (born 1870)
- 31 December – Sir Malcolm Campbell, racing car driver, speedboat driver, and motoring journalist; achieved world speed records on land and water (born 1885)

== See also ==
- List of British films of 1948
