= A Thief in Paradise (1952 film) =

1952 film

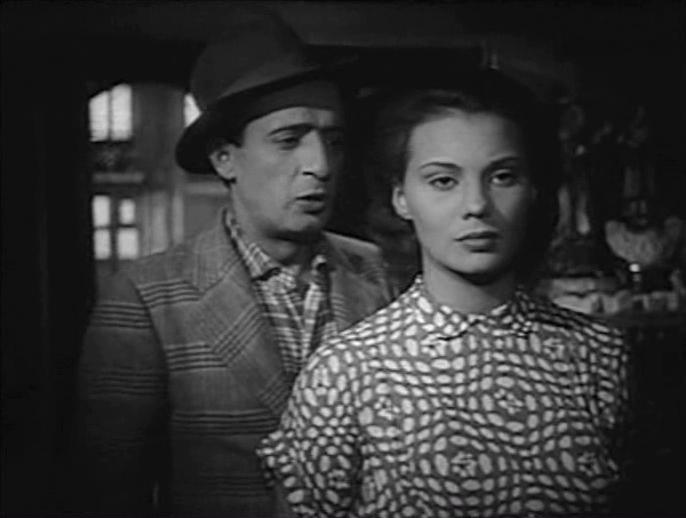
- Directed by: Domenico Paolella
- Written by: Giuseppe Amato; Giuseppe Marotta
- Produced by: Giuseppe Amato
- Starring: Nino Taranto; Hélène Rémy; Francesco Golisano
- Cinematography: Marco Scarpelli
- Edited by: Eraldo Da Roma
- Music by: Nino Rota
- Production company: Produzione Film Giuseppe Amato
- Distributed by: Dear Film
- Release date: 10 January 1952
- Running time: 92 minutes
- Country: Italy
- Language: Italian

A Thief in Paradise (Italian: Un ladro in paradiso) is a 1952 Italian comedy film directed by Domenico Paolella and starring Nino Taranto, Hélène Rémy and Francesco Golisano. It was expanded from a dialect poem written by Eduardo De Filippo. It was shot at Cinecittà Studios in Rome.

== Plot ==
Vincent and Gennaro live by their wits and petty theft in the city of Naples. On Christmas Eve, Gennaro steals a service of glasses and gives it to his girlfriend Nannarella, a poor and honest seamstress . Unfortunately, it was discovered, and Gennaro and Vincenzo are arrested. While it is recommended to St. Joseph, it seems that they shower them with a gesture of their goodwill. Released from jail after three months full of good intentions, they are forgiven and Nannarella resumes contact with Gennaro. Since Vincent and Gennaro cannot find honest work, the two are forced to steal more.

== Cast ==
- Nino Taranto as Vincenzo De Pretore
- Francesco Golisano as Gennarino
- Hélène Rémy as Nanninella
- Filippo Scelzo as The Surgeon
- Carlo Tamberlani as Saint Joseph
- Salvatore Costa as Father Carmine
- Fanfulla as The Cheater
- Marisa Finiani as Donna Carmela
- Carlo Delle Piane
- Carlo Pisacane
- Amedeo Girardi
- Pina Piovani
- Luigi Pisano
- Manfredi Polverosi

== Bibliography ==
- Bender, Robert Gene. The Dialect Theatre of Eduardo de Filippo. Stanford University, 1963.
- Dyer, Richard. Nino Rota: Music, Film and Feeling. Bloomsbury Publishing, 2019.
