= The Small Voice =

1948 film

- Directed by: Fergus McDonell
- Written by: George Barraud; Derek Neame; Julian Orde
- Based on: The Small Voice Robert Westerby
- Produced by: Anthony Havelock-Allan
- Starring: Valerie Hobson; James Donald; Howard Keel
- Cinematography: Stanley Pavey
- Edited by: Manuel del Campo
- Music by: Stanley Black
- Production company: Constellation Films
- Distributed by: British Lion Films
- Release date: 30 November 1948
- Running time: 85 minutes
- Country: United Kingdom
- Language: English
- Budget: £121,000
- Box office: £105,199 (UK)

The Small Voice (US title: The Hideout) is a 1948 British thriller film directed by Fergus McDonell and starring Valerie Hobson, James Donald and Howard Keel (credited as Harold Keel). The film is part of a group of British film noir produced around this time. It was written by George Barraud, Derek Neame and Julian Orde based on the 1940 novel of the same name by Robert Westerby.

It was the film debut of Howard Keel who made it while appearing in the original London production of Oklahoma!

The film received a BAFTA nomination for Best British Film in 1949.

The "small voice" of the title is referred to at the end of the film: the small voice in your own head, of one's conscience telling one not to do something.

== Plot ==
Three ex-army men escape from Dartmoor Prison and kill a man to get his car. Meanwhile, Mr and Mrs Byrne bicker on a train and discuss divorce before arriving at Llanbach in Wales, near their home. He has lost a leg in the war, and is very bitter. As a result they have drifted apart. He is now a playwright, and she is a stage actress.

As they drive along a country road at night they are stopped at a road block by police, who are looking for the three escaped convicts. Five minutes later the couple spot broken glass and a missing parapet on an awkward bend and Mr Byrne goes to investigate. A man comes up the dark embankment and says there is another man in the car. The couple take them to their house, which is only a mile away, intending to phone for medical assistance.

They treat the injured man in the kitchen but the first man disappears and steals their car. They are immediately suspicious and the injured man pulls a gun.

Back at the crash scene the first convict locates the third man and it is revealed that they hit another car. They search and find the car. The chauffeur is dead but two children are cowering in the back seat. They take the children back to the house.

Mr and Mrs Byrne are locked in one room together and joke about the irony. The children are locked in a room with the Byrnes' housekeeper, Mrs Potter. The missing children's parents are at a police station trying to locate the missing car and children.

The next day the Sunday newspaper arrives and reveals that the escaped convicts have killed a policeman.

The well-educated children start correcting the convicts on their grammar. Mrs Potter distracts the convicts while Mrs Byrne escapes from an upper window. She is caught by Boke, the gang leader, while trying to make a call from a telephone box. He later explains to Mr Byrne that he was born in Liverpool but raised in Chicago, and he was in prison for killing an officer in his regiment.

The boy appears to have meningitis. Boke cannot stand the screaming, and Mr Byrne says this is because of the 'small clear voice of conscience'. Boke is furious and says he is going to put an end to the screaming and that the boy, previously said by the Byrnes to have only a one in five chance of survival, now has no chance. He goes upstairs to shoot the child, but when he looks out of the window he sees police cars approaching, which the others do not see. Mr Byrne finds an unattended gun and goes to stop Boke harming the child. He orders Boke to drop his gun or he will shoot, but Boke points out that the safety catch is still on. Mr Byrne briefly looks at the gun to take the safety catch off, and when he looks back, Boke turns his gun towards the child, and Mr Byrne shoots. Later, he realises that Boke deliberately forced him into shooting him; the safety catch on his gun was still on.

== Cast ==
- Valerie Hobson as Eleanor Byrne
- James Donald as Murray Byrne
- Howard Keel as Boke, an escapee (credited as Harold Keel)
- David Greene as Jim, an escapee
- Michael Balfour as Frankie, an escapee
- Joan Young as Mrs Potter, the housekeeper
- Angela Fouldes as Jenny Moss (credited as Angela Faulds)
- Glyn Dearman as Ken Moss
- Norman Claridge as Superintendent
- Edward Evans as Police Inspector
- Bill Shine as Maitland
- Michael Hordern as Dr Mennell
- Edward Palmer as Joe Wallis
- Lyn Evans as ticket collector

== Production ==
The film was produced by Tony Havelock Allan who later recalled:

It got very good notices and was very well received but didn’t make much money. Our director was Fergus McDonell, who was an editor for Carol Reed. Carol had suggested I give him a chance to direct. I nursed him through our film and he obviously had talent but he was so highly strung that he could very easily have had a nervous breakdown. He went to Canada afterwards and did well in the documentary field.

The film's sets were designed by the art director Andrew Mazzei.

Havelock-Allen said the film "got very good notices and a lot of help, but it didn’t make any real money. It made a few thousand, but the few thousand goes out of the window very quickly if you’ve got the rent of an office in Hanover Square and three or four employees."

== Reception ==
=== Box office ===
As of 30 June 1949 the film earned £80,000 in the UK of which £59,844 went to the producer.

=== Critical ===
The Monthly Film Bulletin wrote: "Despite an exciting opening and the drama of the situation the film seems to lack power and grip. Possibly this is because the showing of the interminable details of life as lived by Murray, Eleanor, their maid, and the children during the grim weekend, whilst usefully serving to emphasize the long-drawn-out suspense felt by these unfortunates, has also the inevitable effect of slowing down the anticipatory excitement which should be felt by the audience as to the outcome of the plot."

Virginia Graham wrote in The Spectator in 1948, "all this is admirably done, and eventually provides melodrama of an order as English and as excellent as muffins."

TV Guide concluded that "the tension is sustained throughout, with some interesting plot twists along the way."

In The Radio Times Guide to Films David Parkinson gave the film 3/5 stars, writing: "Howard Keel made his screen debut in this tense adaptation. Although he eventually proves to have a streak of decency, Keel is imposingly menacing as a convict who exploits the charity of James Donald and Valerie Hobson to hold them and a couple of children hostage until he and confederates David Greene and Michael Balfour can make good their escape. His performance led to a contract with MGM and typecasting as a singing hunk that would prevent him from playing an equally challenging role for many years."

== Bibliography ==
- Mayer, Geoff. Roy Ward Baker. Manchester University Press, 2004.
