= Caroline Gipps =

Caroline Victoria Gipps (born 2 February 1948) was Vice-chancellor of the University of Wolverhampton from 2005 to 2011.

Gipps read psychology at Bristol University and before her appointment at Wolverhampton had been dean of research at the Institute of Education and Deputy Vice-chancellor at Kingston University.
