= Liliana Mancini =

Italian film actress

Liliana Mancini was an Italian film actress. She was briefly a star of the neorealist movement after being cast by Renato Castellani in the 1948 film Under the Sun of Rome. Although she played the female lead in Twenty Years (1949), she quickly struggled to find further significant roles. Later she found some work in the editorial department.

In 1951 Luchino Visconti, himself associated with neorealism, cast her in Bellissima his drama of the perils of film stardom. The film's protagonist played by Anna Magnani comes across Mancini working as an ordinary employee at the Cinecitta Studios and recognises her as the star of Under the Sun of Rome. Mancini relates her own story as a warning about the illusion of instant fame. This was part of a wider trend of many of the actors who enjoyed success in neorealist classics of the late 1940s.

== Selected filmography ==
- Under the Sun of Rome (1948)
- Twenty Years (1949)
- Seven Hours of Trouble (1951)
- Bellissima (1951)

== Bibliography ==
- Bacon, Henry. Visconti: Explorations of Beauty and Decay. Cambridge University Press, 1998.
- Gundle, Stephen. Fame Amid the Ruins: Italian Film Stardom in the Age of Neorealism. Berghahn Books, 2019.
- Haaland, Torunn. Italian Neorealist Cinema. Edinburgh University Press, 2012.
