= Under the Sun of Rome =

- Directed by: Renato Castellani
- Written by: Sergio Amidei; Renato Castellani; Emilio Cecchi; Ettore Margadonna; Fausto Tozzi
- Produced by: Sandro Ghenzi
- Cinematography: Domenico Scala
- Edited by: Giuliano Betti
- Music by: Nino Rota
- Production company: Universalcine
- Distributed by: Fincine
- Release date: 2 October 1948
- Running time: 104 minutes
- Country: Italy
- Language: Italian

Under the Sun of Rome (Italian: Sotto il sole di Roma) is a 1948 Italian drama film directed by Renato Castellani. It was the first film of Castellani's Italian neorealism trilogy about poor people, followed by È primavera... in 1949 and Cannes Film Festival Palme d'Or winner Two Cents Worth of Hope in 1952.

== Cast ==
- Oscar Blando as Ciro
- Liliana Mancini as Iris
- Francesco Golisano as Geppa
- Ennio Fabeni as Bruno
- Alfredo Locatelli as Nerone
- Gaetano Chiurazzi as Bellicapelli
- Anselmo Di Biagio as Dottorino
- Ferruccio Tozzi as Ciro's father
- Maria Tozzi as Ciro's mother
- Giuseppina Fava as Janitor
- Raffaele Caporilli as 'Mbriaschini
- Ilario Malaschini as Pirata
- Omero Paoloni as Coccolone
- Gisella Monaldi as Tosca
- Alberto Sordi as Fernando
- Luigi Valentini as Romoletto
- Panaccioni as Panaccioni
- Angelo Giacometti as cameriere
- Lorenzo di Marco as contadino
