= Francesco Golisano =

Italian film actor

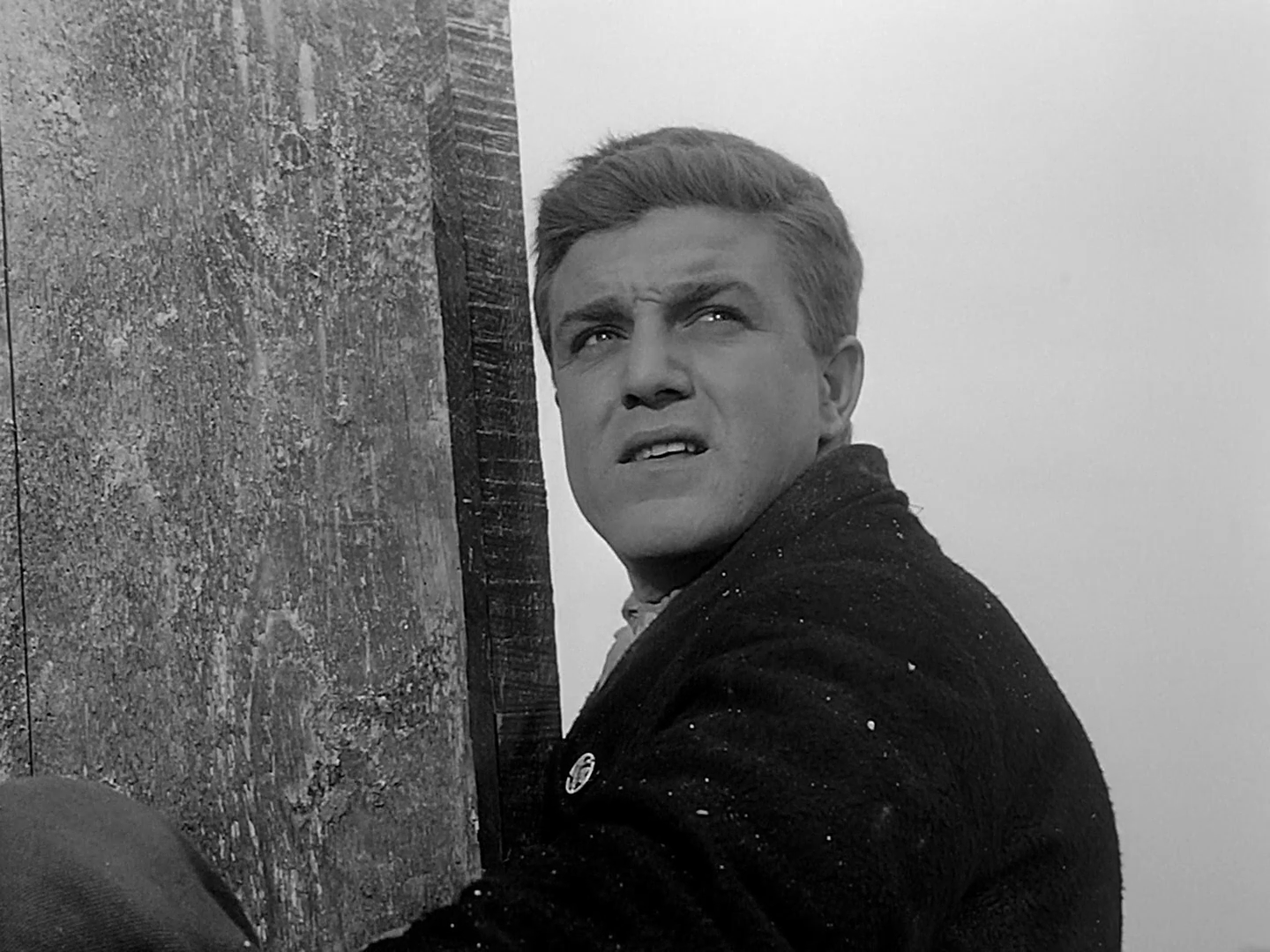
- Golisano in Miracle in Milan (1951)
- Born: 5 April 1929; Riesi, Caltanissetta, Italy
- Died: 6 August 1990 (aged 61); Rome, Italy
- Occupation: Actor

Francesco Golisano, also known as Franco Golisano (5 April 1929 – 6 August 1990) was an Italian film actor.

He was an employee of the Post Office when film director Renato Castellani held auditions to appear in Under the Sun of Rome (1948). Golisano was chosen along with other young people of the street, and played the part of Geppa. This led to more work with filmmaker Giorgio Bianchi. In 1951, Golisano played his most famous role – the kind-hearted Totò in Vittorio De Sica's Miracle in Milan, which won the Palme D'Or at the Cannes Film Festival. After Il romanzo della mia vita (1952) Golisano abandoned his acting career and retired to private life.

== Filmography ==
- Sotto il sole di Roma (1948) a.k.a. Under the Sun of Rome
- Twenty Years (1949)
- Il Caimano del Piave (1951)
- Miracolo a Milano (1951) a.k.a. Miracle in Milan
- A Thief in Paradise (1952)
- Una Croce senza nome (1952)
- I'm the Hero (1952)
- Il romanzo della mia vita (1952)
