= List of The Adventures of Robin Hood episodes =

This is a list of episodes for the 1950s British television series The Adventures of Robin Hood, sometimes broadcast in North America under the title The Adventures in Sherwood Forest. This show ran for 143 episodes across four series.

== Episode list ==
This episode list shows the order and dates in which episodes were shown in the London region. Episodes were first shown on different dates and sometimes out of sequence in other regions, the US and in other countries.

Airdates are for ATV London ITV regions varied date and order. The order is taken from the British Film Institute database. Except: "Errand of Mercy" (series 1) no BFI data, original US TX date used. "The Goldmaker" and "Isabella" (series 2) no BFI TX date for (1956/57) only (1961), original US TX dates used. "The Salt King" (series 3) 1st repeat BFI date used, as BFI 1st TX date places episode at start of series 2. IMDb gives broadcast dates and order shown in the US.

At the time this show was produced in the 1950s, British television production was organised on the basis of 13-week production blocks, with contracts being parcelled out by the broadcaster in quantities of thirteen episodes each—exactly one quarter of a 52-week year. Accordingly, all seasons of this show were made in some multiple of thirteen episodes, and the writers and guest stars featured were normally signed to contracts for 13 weeks at a time.

=== Screenwriters ===
Many writers on the show were Americans who had been blacklisted as communists in Hollywood, by the House Committee on Un-American Activities. These writers worked under pseudonyms, often changing them every few episodes to avoid drawing attention to themselves.

As well, pseudonyms were sometimes shared between writers, or traded from one writer to another. In particular, the names "John Dyson" and "Neil R. Collins" appear to have been house pseudonyms that were assigned to various writers at different times, with no special affiliation to any one writer or writing team.

- Ring Lardner, Jr. wrote the first episode under the name Lawrence McClellan. This was later changed to the name Eric Heath for UK broadcast.
- Ring Lardner, Jr. and Ian McLellan Hunter used a variety of pseudonyms when working individually or collaboratively. Lardner's notes credit the following pseudonyms to work done by Lardner and/or Hunter: Eric Heath, Oliver Skene, Samuel B. West, Ian Larkin, John Dyson, Leighton Reynolds, Paul Symonds, Neil R. Collins.
- Waldo Salt wrote episodes under the name Arthur Behr, John Dyson and Neil R. Collins.
- When Howard Koch wrote episodes with his wife Anne, they used the single pseudonym Anne Rodney.
- Adrian Scott wrote one episode as Leslie Poynton. The name Leslie Poynton was used on several episodes; it is unknown which other writers may have used this pseudonym.
- Robert Lees wrote several episodes, according to Lardner's papers, as John Dyson. It has been suggested that C. Douglas Phipps (credited writer of episode 30) is another Lees pseudonym, although this is not confirmed.

=== Series 1 (1955–56) ===
No. overall	No. in series	Title	Directed by	Written by	Original release date
1	1	"The Coming of Robin Hood"	Ralph Smart	Lawrence McClellan (on US prints); Eric Heath (on UK prints) (pseudonym of Ring Lardner, Jr.)	25 September 1955
Sir Robin of Locksley returns to England from fighting in the Crusades to discover that the notorious Sir Roger de Lille (Leo McKern) has been given his family's lands and castles, and has had Robin declared an outlaw. Robin takes refuge in Sherwood Forest and joins a band of outlaws led by Will Scatlock (Bruce Seton) who names him Robin of the hood. Features Alfie Bass as Edgar. Introductory minstrel song: "Robin of Locksley, a knight bold and good; back from the Holy Wars, becomes Robin Hood!"
2	2	"The Moneylender"	Ralph Smart	Ian Larkin and Eric Heath (pseudonym of Ring Lardner, Jr.)	2 October 1955
Robin and Edgar (Alfie Bass) lighten the load of a greedy and dishonest moneylender, Herbert of Doncaster (Leo McKern), by taking his purse full of money, and giving the contents of it back to the poor villagers and farmers from whom he had taken it. Will Scatlock, the outlaws' leader, is mortally wounded, and with his dying breath he passes the leadership of his band of men to Robin Hood. Introductory minstrel song: "Trapped by the Sheriff, stands Robin like a mighty rock; and falls heir to the brave Will Scatlock!"
3	3	"Dead or Alive"	Dan Birt	Eric Heath (pseudonym of Ring Lardner, Jr.)	9 October 1955
The giant Little John escapes from his feudal lord and after being captured by the Sheriff's men agrees to capture Robin Hood in exchange for his freedom. Introductory minstrel song: "Freedom is calling to Little John, the giant; Robin helps him understand, a serf can be defiant!" Note: As well as being the first appearance of Archie Duncan as Little John this episode also features the first appearances of Simone Levell as Joan the Blue Boar barmaid and Bernadette O'Farrell as Maid Marian.
4	4	"Friar Tuck"	Ralph Smart	Eric Heath (pseudonym of Ring Lardner, Jr.)	16 October 1955
Robin Hood seeks out Friar Tuck to become the gang's spiritual aid, but becomes embroiled in Tuck's plans to help a young woman marry the man of her choosing, instead of Sir William of Malmesbury (Leslie Phillips), whom she has been pledged to marry by Lord Germaine (Douglas Wilmer), she being his serf. Introductory minstrel song: "Mildred flees Sir William's trope, 'tis Harold she would rather wed; she seeks the aid of Friar Tuck, and vows are safely said!"
5	5	"Maid Marian"	Ralph Smart	Anne Rodney (pseudonym of Howard Koch and Anne Koch)	23 October 1955
Lady Marian Fitzwalter infiltrates the Merry Men, disguised as a page, to capture her childhood friend turned outlaw, Robin of Locksley. Introductory minstrel song: "Robin Hood bold and free, of every man is unafraid; 'til one day he meets his match, with Marian the maid!"
6	6	"The Inquisitor"	Ralph Smart	Anne Rodney (pseudonym of Howard Koch and Anne Koch)	6 November 1955
When Friar Tuck is arrested and taken to be judged by The Archbishop (Jack Melford), Robin and Little John race to his aid. Introductory minstrel song: "The Archbishop comes from France, King Richard's interests to pursue; Robin takes a daring chance, to tell him what is true!"
7	7	"The Knight Who Came To Dinner"	Ralph Smart	Eric Heath (pseudonym of Ring Lardner, Jr.)	13 November 1955
Intro Sir Richard of The Lea (Ian Hunter). Robin and the gang lend Sir Richard of the Lea the money he needs to pay off a debt owed to the corrupt Abbot Franklyn (Frank Royd) who is in league with the Sheriff of Nottingham. Introductory minstrel song: "In days of old when Knights were bold, and practised arts of chivalry; there lived no sadder sight I'm told, than Sir Richard of the Lea!" Note: An alternative version of this episode also exists in the US (available streaming on Amazon Prime, PlutoTV and the Roku Channel), where Sir Richard's debt is owed to the corrupt Baron Emmet, played by John Longden, in place of the Abbot.
8	8	"The Challenge"	Ralph Smart	Eric Heath (pseudonym of Ring Lardner, Jr.)	20 November 1955
The Sheriff wagers with Sir Richard of the Lea that his archer, Giles Black, can defeat Robin Hood in an archery contest. Introductory minstrel song: "Giles Black and Robin Hood, archers of undoubted skill; loose their shafts on target range, but one is champion still!"
9	9	"Queen Eleanor"	Dan Birt	Eric Heath (pseudonym of Ring Lardner, Jr.)	27 November 1955
When Queen Eleanor (Jill Esmond) arrives in Nottingham, her last port of call on her mission to collect funds for King Richard's war in the Holy Land, Lady Marian calls on Robin to give the Queen safe passage through Sherwood Forest. Introductory minstrel song: "Eleanor of Acquitane, to Nottingham for treasure goes; there to learn who are her friends, and those who are her foes!"
10	10	"Checkmate"	Ralph Smart	Peter Lambda	4 December 1955
When Lady Marian is told by her Nanny (Marie Burke) that her grandson has been taken by Count de Walden's (Leslie Phillips) soldiers, Robin is soon at hand to uncover the Count's plans. Introductory minstrel song: "Marian with ardent bloods, keeps Count de Walden occupied; through the castle all the while, his henchmen are defied!"
11	11	"The Ordeal"	Dan Birt	Eric Heath (pseudonym of Ring Lardner, Jr.)	11 December 1955
When Edgar (Alfie Bass) secretly visits his wife and child, he is spotted by a neighbour who reports him to the Sheriff of Nottingham and a plan is hatched to frame him for murder. Introductory minstrel song: "Murder in a village, an outlaw is the one accused; Robin sees that right and truth, shall triumph unabused!"
12	12	"A Guest for the Gallows"	Ralph Smart	Eric Heath (pseudonym of Ring Lardner, Jr.)	25 December 1955
Nottingham's tax collectors find it increasingly difficult to collect the county's levied assessments. When the Sheriff makes an example of poor farmer Will Stuteley, sentencing him to hang for non-payment of taxes, Robin Hood determines to rescue him. Tricking the Sheriff into Sherwood Forest alone, he is held captive and offered his life in exchange for the condemned man. Introductory minstrel song: "Old Will Stuteley cannot pay, and into prison he is cast; the Sheriff is the very one, who turns him loose at last!"
13	13	"The Highlander"	Ralph Smart	Eric Heath (pseudonym of Ring Lardner, Jr.)	25 December 1955
In his intro, Duncan of Stoneykirk (Hugh McDermott), a Highlander, arrives in Sherwood Forest to visit Robin Hood, and hangs around Robin's gang, irritating Robin by flirting with Lady Marian, but his real plans are hidden. Introductory minstrel song: "Strange tales are told of Robin Hood, but strangest far of all the lot; is when he met Wild Duncan, a very canny Scot!"
14	14	"The Wager"	Bernard Knowles	Warren Howard	1 January 1956
When Robin bets Friar Tuck that he can obtain more money by begging than the Friar can by other means, he encounters the unsavoury members of the Beggars guild. Features Geoffrey Keen as the "Blind" Beggar. Introductory minstrel song: "When Robin makes a bet be sure, Normans are the losers; he proves to Friar Tuck that sometimes, beggars can be choosers!"
15	15	"The Betrothal"	Ralph Smart	Paul Symonds	8 January 1956
Sir Richard of the Lea, in seeking approval to get his son (William Lucas) married off to the lovely Lady Gladys (Jennifer Jayne), enlists Robin's help to persuade her father (Charles Lloyd-Pack) that his son is suitable. Introductory minstrel song: "In Sport it's the professionals, that always win the glory; but Robin is the amateur, and that's a different story!"
16	16	"The Alchemist"	Ralph Smart	Eric Heath (pseudonym of Ring Lardner, Jr.)	15 January 1956
A village woman, whose son is an outlaw, is accused of witchcraft for smelting gold coins from stolen plates. Robin must rescue her before she is burned at the stake for consorting with the Devil. Features Anthony Sharp as The Earl and Joyce Blair as his wife Millicent. Introductory minstrel song: "The Sheriff thought to set a trap, with witchcraft and an aged hag; but in two ways good Robin, lets the cat out of the bag!"
17	17	"A Husband for Marian"	Bernard Knowles	John Dyson	22 January 1956
Marian's father, away at the Crusades, arranges her marriage to Sir Hubert (Brian Worth), a Knight who saved his life. Robin saves Marian from marrying gold digging Sir Hubert by posing as a German Knight who had also been promised Marian's hand in marriage years before, but never turned up to claim it. Introductory minstrel song: "Sir Hubert wooed for Marian, he thought his suit was very good; but met a German rival, that was Herr Robin Hood!"
18	18	"The Jongleur"	Bernard Knowles	John Dyson	29 January 1956
A Jongleur, Bartholomew (Peter Hammond), upsets The Sheriff of Nottingham and ends up as Robin's guest for dinner. He is soon recruited to help Robin and Little John in a plan to relieve the Sheriff of the unfair tax money. Introductory minstrel song: "To be a skillful juggler is, a tricky job for any man; especially when Robin juggles with the Sheriff's plans!"
19	19	"The Brothers"	Bernard Knowles	Eric Heath (pseudonym of Ring Lardner, Jr.)	5 February 1956
Robin and Friar Tuck help a poor serf to enter the Monastery at Whitby. However the young man is forced to flee when the Sheriff has his twin brother thrown into prison on trumped up charges. Robin and Tuck devise a plan to free the man's twin and reunite the two siblings. Introductory minstrel song: "The Sheriff tried to capture Guy, and very hard he pressed the search; so here's how Robin Hood became a patron of the church!"
20	20	"The Intruders"	Ralph Smart	Paul Symonds	5 February 1956
When Robin discovers that two students have been committing robberies and claiming to be his men, Robin and Marian teach them a lesson they'll not forget. Introductory minstrel song: "In sport it's the professionals, that always win the glory; but Robin is the amateur, and that's a different story!" Note: Minstrel lyrics are the same as "The Betrothal".
21	21	"Errand of Mercy"	Ralph Smart	John Dyson	6 February 1956
Saint Anthony's Fire is running rampant throughout Nottingham, and it's up to Little John and Robin to deliver much needed supplies to the city, in order to help the poor. However they are discovered and Robin is wounded in battle. It's up to Little John to save the day. Introductory minstrel song: "Robin Hood has many guises, but the strangest on the list; was when he aided Anselm, as a pharmacist!" Note: St. Anthony's fire, caused by ergotism, was caught and spread by eating bread made from rye contaminated with the fungus ergot. Reported symptoms of the period include convulsions, vomiting, hallucinations and limbs turning black, as if burned by fire, and falling off before death. It was first reported in France in 994.
22	22	"The Sheriff's Boots"	Ralph Smart	James Aldridge & Ralph Smart	19 February 1956
Having tried all the boots in Nottingham, the Sheriff finds wonderful boots in the village of Retford. However he soon learns who makes them, and is easily persuaded to let the merchants of Nottingham have their way with the village. Joan Sims appears as Nell. Introductory minstrel song: "When the Sheriff wanted boots, his underlings began the war; when Robin finished with the louts, their feet indeed were sore!"
23	23	"Will Scarlet"	Ralph Smart	John Dyson	March 1956
At the Blue Boar Inn Robin and Little John walk in on the garishly dressed William of Winchester. Little John insults Will, sword play ensues attracting the Sheriff's men. Robin, John and Will fight them off together. The creation of Will Scarlet begins. Features Jennifer Jayne as Olivia. Introductory minstrel song: "Scarlet is a colour that, the Lincoln green does not well suit; but Scarlet in a dandy's hat, becomes a new recruit!"
24	24	"Ladies of Sherwood"	Ralph Smart	Ralph Smart	March 1956
When the town gates are closed to all men until after a hanging, Robin Hood attempts entry disguised as a woman only to be discovered and imprisoned. Introductory minstrel song: "The Merry Maids of Nottingham, were buxom beauteous and good; but none of them was ever quite, like Mistress Robin Hood!"
25	25	"The Deserted Castle"	Bernard Knowles	Eric Heath (pseudonym of Ring Lardner, Jr.)	23 March 1956
Marian takes Robin to an ancient and deserted castle, where he is shocked to see the Queen Mother waiting for him. She has a mission for him that will be of tremendous service to England in general and King Richard in particular in denying an alliance between Prince John and King Phillip of France. Final appearance of Jill Esmond as Queen Eleanor. Introductory minstrel song: "Today we act like diplomats, to his Merry Men bold Robin says; we clear yon castle both of mice and the alliance francais!"
26	26	"The Miser"	Bernard Knowles	Ralph Smart	8 April 1956
Sir William (Laurence Naismith) raises the taxes on his tenant farmers, then threatens to throw them off their land if they don't come up with the money. Robin comes up with a plan to get the villagers their money back, but it involves Friar Tuck keeping them in church while he does so, so Tuck prepares to deliver the longest sermon of his career. Introductory minstrel song: "When taxes come a magic spell, turns silver into useless piles; the people understand it well, and all are wreathed in smiles!"
27	27	"Trial by Battle"	Terence Fisher	Arthur Behr (pseudonym of Waldo Salt)	15 April 1956
Maid Marian is accused of the murder of King's commissioner. Trial by battle is the only hope to stay her execution, but the men of Sherwood feel that Robin is too ill to be her champion. Features Nicholas Parsons as Sir Walter. Introductory minstrel song: "Maid Marian is doomed to hang, brave knights it seems are all too few; of course it's Robin Hood at last, who proves her champion true!"
28	28	"The May Queen"	Bernard Knowles	Ralph Smart	22 April 1956
When Sir Walter (Ian Bannen) of Donington's father is killed at the Third Crusade, the father of his betrothed, Genevieve Blackstock (Gillian Sterrett), intends to swindle him out of his estate, with help from Count de Clifford who claims he was owed a debt by Lord Donington. Walter counters the claims and is forced to settle the matter in armed combat at the May Fayre, Robin steps in to see fair play. Introductory minstrel song: "Robin Hood and Little John, contrive by means of charade; to save a young man's honour, and unite him with his maid!"
29	29	"Children of the Greenwood"	Ralph Smart	John Cousins	29 April 1956
When Arthur A'Bland (Arthur Skinner), a serf to Count FitzUrse, is framed for murder on his land, he flees to safety in Sherwood Forest, his children Alice (Jane Asher) and Oswald (Peter Asher) are taken in by the Lord FitzUrse (John Longden). Robin sets out to reunite Arthur and his offspring. Introductory minstrel song: "From out the mouths of babes come pearls of wisdom, at least so they say; to demonstrate dear boys and girls, we bid thee watch our play!"
30	30	"The Vandals"	Arthur Crabtree	C.D. Phipps	1 May 1956
Masked raiders have slain Ralph Redman and burnt his home, leaving an arrow that points to Robin as the culprit. Robin seeks out the truth at Wells Castle and its new owner Baron Hubert (John Dearth). Introductory minstrel song: "When there's a minstrel near, good music can be counted on; unless his name perchance, is Robin Hood or Little John!".
31	31	"The Byzantine Treasure"	Terence Fisher	Paul Symonds	6 May 1956
Robin unknowingly steals Queen Eleanor's silver Byzantine plates, which were being transported undercover by a monk through Sherwood. Marian involves their friend Sir Richard of the Lea (Ian Hunter), but Sir Richard, as ever, has many debts to pay off and uses the plates to show how wealthy he is. Soon the Sheriff's lieutenant (William Squire) takes an interest. Robin must hold him off before the Archbishop arrives to take the plates to their rightful owner. Introductory minstrel song: "Sir Richard is a doughty knight, who needs no urging to create; impressions of great wealth and might, with borrowed silver plate!"
32	32	"The Wanderer"	Bernard Knowles	Albert G. Ruben	13 May 1956
Intro Joseph of Cordoba (Karl Stepanek). Robin meets travelling physician Joseph of Cordoba, who is reported to the Sheriff when he upsets the local "doctors" by curing the ailing Sir Walter de Lys, when they couldn't. When Derwent's (Victor Woolf) son is injured Robin seeks Joseph's help, but the Sheriff is waiting to trap Derwent, and Robin must save the day. Introductory minstrel song: "Joseph helps an outlaw's son, and is the Sheriff's enemy; but Robin's duel is swiftly won, and both escape Scot free!" Note: Victor Woolf and Paula Byrne are incorrectly billed as Edward and Edward's Wife on the end titles. Woolf, in fact, plays his usual recurring outlaw character Derwent, identified in dialogue as 'Derwent the Joiner', with Byrne as his wife. Paula Byrne also appears as Derwent's wife, named Ethel, in the episode "Errand of Mercy".
33	33	"The Youngest Outlaw"	Bernard Knowles	John Dyson	18 May 1956
The future King of England, Prince Arthur (Peter Asher), is lost in the greenwood. Robin finds him and works to return him to his mother Constance, Duchess of Brittany (Dorothy Alison), while Little John teaches the boy outlaw ways. Robin is tricked and hands the boy over to those who wish him harm. Features Bruce Seton as Lord Torrence. Introductory minstrel song: "Once a boy to Sherwood came, to live beneath the greenwood tree; hoping he could hide his fame, as Duke of Brittany!"
34	34	"The Traitor"	Terence Fisher	Norma Shannon and Ralph Smart	20 May 1956
King Richard is held prisoner in Austria and Robin must ensure the safe passage of the ransom money to the coast, but one of the three lords who brought it to Marian's castle is a potential traitor. Introductory minstrel song: "Traitors when both bold and sly, find treasure a beguiling thing; especially when it can buy, a ransom for a King!"
35	35	"Tables Turned"	Bernard Knowles	Anne Rodney (pseudonym of Howard Koch and Anne Koch)	27 May 1956
When Derwent overhears some messengers talk about the "jewels" they're guarding, he devises a plan to steal the shipment, and successfully carries it out, only to discover that the "jewels" are two small children belonging to a noble family. Introductory minstrel song: "A pair of children cannot change, a forest to a nursery; of this there is no doubt, and yet we'll see what we shall see!"
36	36	"The Thorkil Ghost"	Terence Fisher	Arthur Behr (pseudonym of Waldo Salt)	3 June 1956
Robin and the gang are called upon to seek out the truth behind a murderous Viking ghost at Thorkil castle. Features Barbara Mullen. Introductory minstrel song: "When strolling on All Hallows' Eve, the outlaws make a merry boast; to relieve the castle of, its treasure and its ghost!"
37	37	"Secret Mission"	Lindsay Anderson	Ralph Smart	10 June 1956
The mysterious pilgrim Peregrinus (Patrick Barr) arrives in Nottingham and is not all he seems. Introductory minstrel song: "A gentle pilgrim comes from France, though nothing huge he's not too small; to show six knights to their mischance, he's not so gentle at all!"
38	38	"Richard the Lion-Heart"	Bernard Knowles	Paul Symonds	17 June 1956
Having obtained the list of traitors conspiring to put Prince John on the throne, King Richard/Peregrinus plans to capture the rebel lords' leader, Count de Belvoir, the Earl of Huntingdon. Introductory minstrel song: "Peregrinus is in fact, King Richard of the Lion-Heart; with Robin Hood to guard the realm, the King can then depart!"
39	39	"The Scientist"	Terry Bishop	Neil R. Collins	23 June 1956
The Abbot (Charles Lloyd-Pack) entrusts the safety of Albertus of Oxford (Miles Malleson), a master of science who is wanted by Prince John to construct a device to destroy ships at sea, to Friar Tuck. Robin tries to get the monk to safety, but Sheriff wants a prize for capturing him. Introductory minstrel song: "Tyrant old and tyrant new, turn science to their evil ends; Albertus keeps his secret, until all men are friends!"

=== Series 2 (1956–57) ===
No. overall	No. in series	Title	Directed by	Written by	Original release date
40	1	"The Prisoner"	Bernard Knowles	Anne Rodney (pseudonym of Howard Koch and Anne Koch)	10 August 1956
Prince John (Donald Pleasence) has issued a decree that King Richard is dead and that he will be crowned King. Marian and Robin head to London and the Prince's palace to stop the coronation taking place by proving Richard still lives. Robin must free the King's messenger from the Holy Land held in John's dungeon in time. Introductory minstrel song: "A song has come to Robin's ears, from deep beneath the palace ground; it tells that Richard is alive, and John shall not be crowned!" Note: This episode makes use of the folk song "All around my Hat", said by Robin to be a favourite of Richard's in the Holy Land, though it would seem it wasn't written until the 19th century.
41	2	"Blackmail"	Bernard Knowles	Neil R. Collins	30 September 1956
Prince John goes to visit Nottingham. Lucas (Anthony Dawson), a wine merchant, falls asleep in the back of his wagon, which is stolen by Robin's gang. He overhears Robin talking with Lady Marian, for the visit she has to have 3 unwelcome guests, and Sir Richard of the Lea (Ian Hunter) has to have 40, so Robin takes the wine cart to his castle. Lucas overhears Robin's conversation with Sir Richard and sees the potential for blackmail. Introductory minstrel song: "To foil a blackmail scheme and save, Sir Richard from a vicious jest; Robin names the Sheriff and, the Sheriff does the rest!"
42	3	"A Year and A Day"	Bernard Knowles	Neil R. Collins	14 October 1956
Under Medieval English law, a peasant who escapes serfdom and lives in a city for "a year and a day" is a free man, given the man lives openly, not in hiding. Surgeon Calend (Shaun O'Riordan) has nearly completed that duration, and only has to remain 'at large' until sunset that day and he will be free. The Sheriff closes in on him whilst he is treating Little John. When Robin hears Calend's story he agrees to help, the Sheriff invokes the law of "hue and cry", explaining that any man within hearing must drop his chores and help apprehend the felon. Introductory minstrel song: "In public view the whole day through, remains the serf who's run away; the Sheriff sounds the 'cry and hue', but freedom wins the day!"
43	4	"Ransom"	Terence Fisher	John Dyson	28 October 1956
When the Count de Severne decrees the heavily taxed villagers must also raise the 500 crown ransom for his son, they turn to Robin for help. Guy Quentin (Paul Daneman) reveals the reason for the ransom and Robin turns the tables with Joan's help. Introductory minstrel song: "The price of honour is too high, when villagers must be oppressed; but Joan the barmaid snares Sir Guy, and Robin does the rest!"
44	5	"The Goldmaker"	Terry Bishop	Paul Symonds	29 October 1956
Intro for Lepidus (Alfie Bass), the Alchemist. Hearing he is deep in debt, Robin and Marian call on Sir Richard of the Lea, and find he has fallen under the influence of Lepidus the Alchemist, who has promised to turn his pewter plates to gold, having proved his alchemy 'works'. The Sheriff wants to arrest Lepidus for treason but Robin, after proving Lepidus 'powers' to him, parleys a deal with the greedy Sheriff to give over the alchemist in exchange for Will (Shaun O'Riordan), an outlaw that is to be hanged. Introductory minstrel song: "From rags to riches he will go, Sir Richard is told; alas he is not the first to find, that glitter is not gold!"
45	6	"The Haunted Mill"	Lindsay Anderson	Paul Symonds	4 November 1956
Intro for Tom the Miller (James Hayter). When Sir William (Laurence Hardy) tries to acquire Tom the Miller's flourmill by underhand means, Robin is soon called in to save the day. Introductory minstrel song: "A plague of mice, a stream run dry, has filled the miller with alarm; to catch the villain, Little John must lend his strong right arm!"
46	7	"The Imposters"	Lindsay Anderson	Norman Best	5 November 1956
Lady Pomfret's (Brenda De Banzie) husband hasn't returned from the Crusades for seven years, and under the law he is deemed to be dead. Her cousin LeBlonde (Edward Mulhare) has arrived to take possession of her estate, but an imposter, or two, might help in this situation. Introductory minstrel song: "It's very strange the husbands three, she seems to have that lady proud; then maids and blades make Robin see, the truth that three's a crowd!"
47	8	"The Hero"	Terence Fisher	John Dyson	11 November 1956
The unpopular tax collector Sir Montichet (Ralph Michael) is killed, Mark (Bill Owen) an opportunist thief sees the murder, and is blamed for it, the villagers let him escape reasoning it was self-defence, Mark takes with him the name of the real killer written in blood on a parchment by the victim. Robin welcomes him into his band, but the victim was The Sheriff's brother and he plans to hang eight villagers unless Mark gives himself up. Introductory minstrel song: "Mistakes made in history, about who's hero and who's not; but Robin solves the mystery, and thus unfolds our plot!"
48	9	"Isabella"	Lindsay Anderson	Neil R. Collins	19 November 1956
Princess Avice of Gloucester (Helen Cherry), Prince John's wife, secretly summons Robin to the Tower of London, Prince John (Donald Pleasence) is planning to marry a French Princess, and so she sends Robin to Dover to intercept Lady Isabella of Angouleme (Zena Walker) and make her see the error of her ways. Introductory minstrel song: "The Lady Isabella is as sweet it seems that she can be; she smiles she sighs she cries, but don't believe all that you see!" Note: In this episode, at the Blue Boar Inn, a minstrel sings "The Ballad of Barbara Alan", but the earliest known version of this song is from the 15th century.
49	10	"The Black Patch"	Terry Bishop	John Dyson	25 November 1956
Sir Dunston of the Black Patch (Duncan Lamont) arrives at Fitzwilliam Hall. He tells Marian that he has sworn to wear the patch over his left eye until he has captured Robin Hood and seen him swing from the gallows in London. Having laid a false rumour that he is carrying gold to Scotland, which Marian has passed on to the outlaws, he sets off through Sherwood to capture Robin when he tries to steal it. Introductory minstrel song: "Sir Dunston comes to Nottingham, it's clear he's up to nothing good; he captivates Maid Marian, and captures Robin Hood!"
50	11	"Outlaw Money"	Terry Bishop	John Dyson	2 December 1956
Henry (Sid James), Master of the Nottingham Mint, falls foul of the Sheriff's men when they catch him with Robin. The Sheriff takes this opportunity to bring in his own Minter (Leonard Sachs). Henry mints pure silver dinars for the starving villagers of Lottham at Robin's camp. When they try to spend them at the market, they are denounced as counterfeit and Friar Tuck is arrested and put on trial for forgery. Henry must prove that the Sheriff's coinage is impure, silver mixed with base metal and illegal under the law. Introductory minstrel song: "Villagers are being starved, the outlaws quickly take the hint; and making money's not so hard, when Robin has the mint!"
51	12	"Hubert"	Terence Fisher	Ralph Smart & Ann Rodney	9 December 1956
Sir Hubert (William Greene) seeks Robin's help to reunite him with his true love Rowena (Dorothy Bromiley) whose father, Sir Thomas (William Mervyn) is marrying her off to a local lord (Richard Pascoe). Robin is soon at work on his behalf. Introductory minstrel song: "Sir Hubert is the kind of Knight, who cannot fence and cannot fight; he doesn't know a lance by sight, nor left hand from the right!"
52	13	"The Trap"	Terry Bishop	Charles Early	16 December 1956
Sir Simon (Alfred Burke) goes undercover of being a cobbler named Jack mistreated by the Sheriff, into Robin's band, in a clever plan by the Sheriff to turn the outlaws against Robin. 'Jack' lays black rumours of Robin robbing clerics and taking money from the King's ransom and betraying Tom of Guant (Andrew Downie), now residing in the Sheriff's dungeon. It seems Robin has met his match. Introductory minstrel song: "The Sheriff never gives up hope, of catching Robin finally; he lays a clever trap, with what result you now shall see!"
53	14	"The Friar's Pilgrimage"	Arthur Crabtree	Peter Key	23 December 1956
When Friar Tuck, accompanied by Robin, goes to Canterbury, they find a local maid, Alice (Maureen Davis), accused of witchcraft, saving her from drowning by the Count Duprez's (Paul Eddington) soldiers. Robin and Friar Tuck uncover a plot by the Count against Lady Margaret (Greta Gynt). Introductory minstrel song: "The flowers of Kent with nectar flow, and honey bees grow fat upon it; there Robin goes and neatly puts, a bee in someone's bonnet!"
54	15	"The Blackbird"	Terence Fisher	Frances Nesbitt	30 December 1956
After being embarrassed by his fellow outlaws over his romantic feelings for Joan, Little John leaves the Blue Boar Inn in ill humour and is caught by the Sheriff's soldiers. He is captured and taken to the Sheriff who sentences him to be hanged. His Seneschal (Patrick Troughton) warns that no local man will dare to incur the wrath of Robin Hood by hanging Little John, and so the Sheriff sends for a masked executioner from the Tower of London. Introductory minstrel song: "When Little John gets in a rage, the Sheriff has him caught and bound; he drags him to the gallows but, no hangman can be found!" Opening scene chorus: Merry Men singing at Blue Boar Inn: "From out the noose we slithered loose, his lordship fooled, again, again!, a simple roose that cooked his goose, of sherwood's merry men. Good singers a'lend a cheery note bring out all field and ven and ven the Sheriff will ne'er be called mein host, by Sherwood's Merry Men!"
55	16	"The Dream"	Terence Fisher	Anne Rodney (pseudonym of Howard Koch and Anne Koch)	6 January 1957
Marian's cousin Sir William (Patrick Troughton) arrives in Sherwood with a message from Queen Eleanor regarding the King's ransom in Austria, but Marian has a forbidding dream of warning and Robin must determine the truth behind his claims and Marian's fears. Introductory minstrel song: "Marian has a dreamed a dream, of danger lurking for the bold; but Robin scoffs until its plain, his fate has been foretold!"
56	17	"The Shell Game"	Terry Bishop	Anne Rodney (pseudonym of Howard Koch and Anne Koch)	13 January 1957
A confidence trickster from London named Pick (Sam Kydd), a practitioner of the old shell game, arrives in Sherwood. Queen Eleanor's chaplain (Patrick Troughton) asks Robin to steal The Queen's jewels from Hastings House in London to aid King Richard, as Prince John has arrested the Schenesal who was to have handed them over to the chaplain. Robin recruits Pick in the plot, but Little John warns Robin to be wary of his new ally. Introductory minstrel song: "A daring raid is being planned, and Pick is chosen for the try; because he’s proven that his hand is quicker than your eye!"
57	18	"The Final Tax"	Terry Bishop	Paul Symonds	20 January 1957
When Tom Joyner (Fred Goddard) falls from a high tree trying to retrieve Sir Charles's (Paul Eddington) son's cat, the Lord Bailiff (Dennis Edwards) after Friar Tuck has pronounced death, and invokes the Heriot Tax, which means Sir Charles is entitled to any of Tom's goods and chattels, which will leave the serf's family penniless. Tom however was only stunned and Friar Tuck devises a way to end this death tax in the village forever, with a little help from Little John and the gang. Introductory minstrel song: "Farmer Tom is dead they say, which surely alters all the facts; for instance Tuck finds out a way, to end a hated tax!" Note: Richard Greene does not appear in this episode.
58	19	"Ambush"	Lindsay Anderson	Ernest Bornemann & Ralph Smart	27 January 1957
Prince Arthur (Peter Asher) is held prisoner at the Tower of London. Prince John takes him to Sherwood on a hunting trip, whilst staying at Marian's castle with the Prince. John and the Sheriff devise a way to keep Robin and his band out of the way, while they put into action an ambush plan, involving phoney outlaws, that will lead to the deaths of prince Arthur and Lady Marian. Introductory minstrel song: "Prince John conducts his game of chance, by putting Arthur’s life at stake; but Robin wins against the odds, and takes the lad to France!"
59	20	"The Bandit of Brittany"	Terry Bishop	Milton S. Schlesinger	3 February 1957
When Robin and Friar Tuck escort Prince Arthur and Lady Constance (Dorothy Alison) to safety in France they encounter Jacques Chapaeu (Harold Kasket), the self-proclaimed Robin Hood of France, who holds them captive meaning to exchange Prince Arthur for his own brother who is held in the Paris Prison, until Friar Tuck introduces him to the 'real' Robin Hood. Soon Robin and Jacques are involved in a prison escape plan. Introductory minstrel song: "Across the channel safety gleams, so Robin takes a daring chance; he trusts a stranger who it seems, is Robin Hood of France!"
60	21	"The Goldmaker's Return"	Terry Bishop	Alan Moreland	10 February 1957
Lepidus, the Alchemist, still held prisoner by the Sheriff, has promised to make gold for him in return for his freedom. The Sheriff, dubious of his claim after being kept waiting for six weeks, threatens that he will hang him in seven days time unless his alchemy begins to work. As Robin is away in France it is up to Marian to come up with a plan to satisfy the Sheriff and save Lepidus from being hanged. Introductory minstrel song: "The Sheriff asks the alchemist, why do you not turn lead to gold; to which the answer is quite plain, 'I have a nasty cold!'" Note: Richard Greene does not appear in this episode.
61	22	"Flight from France"	Terry Bishop	Milton S. Schlesinger	17 February 1957
While waiting for a boat to take them back to England, Robin spots Sir Roderick (Alan Edwards), an emissary of Prince John, disguised as a wine merchant, collecting gold for the Prince. Robin and Tuck contact the French underground via the waitress at the "Black Rabbit" Inn, Michelle (Ingeborg Wells), for help in uncovering the plot. Robin and Tuck decide to divert the gold, and a little impersonation is called for. Introductory minstrel song: "The enemy is everywhere, but Tuck and Robin take their chance; the answer is an underground, and a charming maid of France!"
62	23	"Fair Play"	Terry Bishop	Sidney Wells	24 February 1957
Three of Robin's men travel undercover as part of a group of Bavarian acrobats, The Flying Four (played by acrobat team The Volants), to a fair to meet their wives and families. A greedy Gypsy fortune teller betrays them to the Sheriff of Nottingham, who immediately arrests them. Robin, on his return from France, must break them out before they are executed. Introductory minstrel song: "To the Fayre three outlaws go, for naught except a pleasant day; their happiness soon turns to woe, 'till Robin shows a way!"
63	24	"The Secret Pool"	Don Chaffey	John Dyson	3 March 1957
While fishing in a secret pool—a tributary that leads directly to Sir Cedric's (George Benson) private lake—Robin and Marian see Sir Cedric's men arresting a poor, hungry serf for poaching eels from Cedric's lake. Marian goes to Cedric to plead for the man's release, while Robin decides to take a different tactic, one involving Cedric's obsession for fishing. Introductory minstrel song: "Even outlaws can't deter, Sir Cedric from his lifelong wish; the thing he yearns for most, is just a catch of bigger fish!"
64	25	"The Dowry"	Anthony Squire	Neil R. Collins	10 March 1957
When Master Judd (William Mervyn), a wealthy London merchant and his daughter Bess (Jeanette Hutchinson) arrive in Sherwood carrying a 1,000 crown dowry, Little John and Garth (David Cameron) end up with the girl instead of the money. Sir Harold (Paul Eddington) and Master Judd receive a ransom demand, and Bess learns that love is more important than becoming a noble lady. Introductory minstrel song: "A lady's just a girl who cares, for riches more than a caress; so outlaws are the men to make, a girl of Lady Bess!"
65	26	"The York Treasure"	Terry Bishop	Clare Thorne	17 March 1957
Joseph of Cordoba and his daughter Esther (Helena de Crespo) have escaped from a riot against Jews in York organised by Lord Malbete (Allan Cuthbertson), taking with them the York Treasure, a sum of money collected by the Jews to pay the captain of the ship that will arrive in the seaport of Grimsby in four days time that is bringing Jewish refugees to England. Whilst Joseph rests in Sherwood with a leg wound, Robin, Little John and Esther head for the coast with the hatemongering Malbete in pursuit. The cast list includes Karel Stepanek and Wilfred Brambell Introductory minstrel song: "A plan to help the refugees is nearly wrecked by Norman greed; 'til Robin proves again, a friend in need's a friend indeed!" Note: This episode references the anti-Jewish riots in England in the 12th century.
66	27	"The Borrowed Baby"	Don Chaffey	Aileen Hamilton	24 March 1957
Robin and his men are accused of stealing a gold shipment, and Maid Marian comes under suspicion for being a spy for Robin. The Sheriff borrows a baby girl to abandon in Sherwood Forest and trap Marian when the outlaws pass the baby to her. Introductory minstrel song: "The villain has a crafty plan, the Sheriff bets a hundred crowns; but Robin rescues Marian, and makes them look like clowns!"
67	28	"The Black Five"	Anthony Squire	Michael Connor	31 March 1957
Robin and his archenemy, the Sheriff of Nottingham, set aside their differences temporarily to work together to rid Nottingham of the Duke DeMoreville (Patrick Cargill), a murderous psychopath whom the terrified citizenry refers to as "The Hangman of Leicester", who is sending five black pearls to Prince John for the Sheriff's head. Introductory minstrel song: "A cryptic message Robin finds, and proves beyond the slightest doubt; that honest men can sometimes thrive, when greedy thieves fall out!"
68	29	"Food for Thought"	Terry Bishop	Sidney Wells	7 April 1957
A pair of villagers from Upper Minton, Ludlow (Meredith Edwards) and Barker (Duncan Lamont), come to Robin's camp and tell him of an oppressive new tax—the third that year—imposed on them by the greedy Count Olivier (John Sharplin). In addition the Count has taken the villagers food supplies for a banquet at his castle, forcing Robin to turn the tables on the Count. Also features Patrick Troughton as the Count's seneschal and Charles Lloyd-Pack as the French Chef. Introductory minstrel song: "A hungry winter it will be, without an extra bite to spare; unless the secret is well kept, and each one does his share!"
69	30	"Too Many Earls"	Robert Day	Milton Schlesinger	14 April 1957
The outlaws of Sherwood are desperately in need of money. Marian hatches a scheme involving her bird-watching uncle, the Earl of Rochdale (Arthur Howard), an archery tournament against the Earl of Northgate's best bowman and a letter of safe conduct, which Robin obtains by Loud Lawrence (Nigel Davenport) impersonating the Earl, signed by the Sheriff. Introductory minstrel song: "The outlaws are in need of cash, they're full of worry and despair; 'til Marian suggests a plan, and sends them to the fair!"
70	31	"Highland Fling"	Terry Bishop	Leighton Reynolds	21 April 1957
Robin and Friar Tuck visit Scotland on a mission to collect money owed to King Richard by the treacherous King William the Lion (Duncan McIntyre), and encounters the outlaw Duncan of Stoneykirk (Hugh McDermott) again who wants a share of the money after saving Robin, but not Tuck, who is seemingly killed. Introductory minstrel song: "The Highlander you may recall was once the subject of our tale; and now with dirk and kilt and all, he's back on Robin's trail!"
71	32	"The Mystery of Ireland's Eye"	Terry Bishop	James Carhartt & Nicholas Winter	28 April 1957
Robin and Friar Tuck escort Marian to Ireland to discover the whereabouts of her Uncle Edward (A. J. Brown) on Ireland's Eye. The people of the island are terrorised by the pagan priest, Rolfe (Eddie Byrne), and the power of Thor. Marian is taken prisoner to be sacrificed with her uncle unless Robin and Tuck can discredit Rolfe. Introductory minstrel song: "Pagan rites on misty heights, and bonfires casting shadows high; that's what Robin finds tonight, on lonely Ireland's Eye!"
72	33	"The Little People"	Don Chaffey	James Carhartt & Nicholas Winter	5 May 1957
Still in Ireland, Robin, Marian and Friar Tuck are making their way to Cork harbour and a boat back to England when a storm forces them to stay in the barn of a Pat (Barry Keegan) and Maeve (Peggy Marshal) Nolan. When the couple's home is burnt down, the trio are accused and to stop them being hanged, Robin claims kinship with "the little people" – leprechauns, and he and Tuck are given 24 hours to bring back proof of their existence, with Marian as hostage. Orphan children living in the local seacaves provide the evidence they need. Introductory minstrel song: "In Ireland girls and boys at play, take on the most outlandish forms; until you look again and find, they're simply Leprechauns!"
73	34	"The Infidel"	Terence Fisher	John Dyson & Basil Dawson	12 May 1957
Sir James's (Nigel Davenport) uncle is held hostage in the Holy Land. An infidel, Ali Ben Arra (Francis Matthews), held prisoner in Nottingham is to be exchanged for him. However, Sir James, in a plot to gain his inheritance, intends to kill the prisoner in Sherwood Forest and blame Robin Hood. Introductory minstrel song: "A stranger from the Far of East, a captive from the Holy Land; excites the people's hate and fear, 'til Robin takes a hand!"
74	35	"The Path of True Love"	Terence Fisher	Alan Moreland & Basil Dawson	26 May 1957
According to Robin's father's will, when Locksley Hall bell rings on Lady Day, if the tenant farmers/copyholders of his estate have performed their tasks for three years, which they have, they will own their lands in perpetuity. However Sir Charles (Lionel Jeffries), the current occupant, has found a loophole, and so Robin has to sort out the situation and Marian sings "Sumer Is Icumen In". Introductory minstrel song: "Legalities are sometimes used, to demonstrate that might is right; but Robin's Band has also proved, that sometimes right is might!"
75	36	"The Road in the Air"	Robert Day	Carol Warner Gluck & Albert A. Dorner	2 June 1957
Once again Sir William tries to part Tom the Miller (James Hayter) from his flour mill, this time by charging a toll to use the road to the mill. Introductory minstrel song: "'They'll have no bread' Sir William said, 'until the mill belongs to me'; 'they'll have their bread' as Robin said, 'because the air is free!'"
76	37	"Carlotta"	Anthony Squire	Michael Connor & Basil Dawson	9 June 1957
Little John has fallen for a Gypsy dancer, Carlotta (Jennifer Jayne), who is staying at the Blue Boar Inn, upsetting Joan. She also dances at the Sheriff's castle, and Robin wants to know the route of the next tax shipment to London. Little John asks the girl to obtain the information. Robin takes no chances and prepares in case of a trap. Introductory minstrel song: "Little John a’courting girls, and sings a charming serenade; but will his love to him be true, or will he be betrayed?"

=== Series 3 (1957–58) ===
No. overall	No. in series	Title	Directed by	Written by	Original release date
77	1	"The Frightened Tailor"	Anthony Squire	Michael Connor	6 September 1957
Robin with the aid of a local tailor Ezekiel (Hugh Burden) keeps a list of those loyal to King Richard out of the hands of the Sheriff of Nottingham. Introductory minstrel song: "The tailor plies his gentle trade, his nimble hands are never still; when Robin takes up stitching too, the Sheriff gets the bill!"
78	2	"Pepper"	Robert Day	Michael Connor	15 September 1957
Princess Irene (Monica Stevenson) of Byzantium, who has been held hostage by Prince John (Hubert Gregg), is being returned home to Byzantium via Sherwood with Byzantine Ambassador Androclyse (Peter Welch). She has fallen in love with Prince John and escapes back to London, using pepper to evade Robin. Robin has to convince the Princess not to marry John.
79	3	"The Salt King"	Don Chaffey	Carey Wilber	22 September 1957
Lord Guthrie (Manning Wilson) 'steals' his own salt supplies to push the prices up and Robin is blamed. Robin and Little John obtain salt from the coast and Tuck distributes it freely, until Lord Guthrie's partner, the Sheriff, confiscates it. Another plan is required, needing Roger of Antioch, a "salt diviner".
80	4	"A Tuck in Time"	Terry Bishop	James Carhardt & Nicholas Winter	29 September 1957
Intro for Friar Tuck's twin brother Edgar. Edgar is found showing off his 'Devil Crackers' to the locals of Nottingham, made using 'Devil' powder that Edgar discovered in Cathay. He is soon summoned to Fitzwalter Hall by The Sheriff to demonstrate his lethal weapon, the 'Death Tube', to Prince John (Hubert Gregg) who is hunting in Sherwood Forest. Marian, Robin and Friar Tuck, disguised as Edgar determine to discover the formulae of the 'Devil' powder.
81	5	"The Charter"	Terry Bishop	John Dyson	6 October 1957
Lord Grunwald (Paul Eddington), dying, passes the location of a charter that will limit Prince John's power if he becomes King, on to his manservant Hulme (Philip Ray). Marian informs Robin who must infiltrate Grunwald's last party, with the Sheriff present, at the castle of the Lord's nephew, Sir Bascomb (Harry H. Corbett).
82	6	"Change of Heart"	Terry Bishop	Basil Dawson	13 October 1957
Robin travels to the Forest of Dean in the Wye valley to help a tribe of Celts led by Brack (Michael Ripper), who are to be thrown off the land of Sir Humphrey of Chepstow (Eddie Byrne). Using the tribes 'fever brew', a hallucinogen, Robin changes place with Sir Humphrey to cause a change of heart. Note: An end title credits the Welsh Mountain footage courtesy of the British Travel and Holidays Association.
83	7	"Brother Battle"	Robert Day	Leslie Poynton	20 October 1957
Friar Brother Wootan (Francis de Wolff), (or 'Brother Battle' as he is known, because of his fiery temper) arrives in Sherwood looking for Friar Tuck; it is his intention to set up a school in the forest. Little John is not convinced learning is a good idea and, when Brother Battle is arrested by the Sheriff, the outlaws have to rescue him.
84	8	"My Brother's Keeper"	Don Chaffey	Neil R. Collins	27 October 1957
When a man kills his own brother, Robin and Little John disagree whether it is right to be 'my brother's keeper'. With Friar Tuck's help, Robin and Little John dress as mummers to perform the folk play for Lent (Cain and Abel) in front of the Sheriff to draw out the murderous brother.
85	9	"An Apple for the Archer"	Terry Bishop	James Aldridge	3 November 1957
Apple-grower Timothy Cox (Kenneth Cope) must win the hand of Mary Quatermaine (Ann Firbank), against her Uncle's wishes, by beating Pierre of Bordeaux (Paul Eddington) in an archery contest. Hopeless with the longbow, Robin lends a hand by taking Timothy to a Bowyer to learn the art of bowmaking. The final round of the contest is shooting an apple in the air.
86	10	"The Angry Village"	Terry Bishop	Shirl Hendryx	10 November 1957
During a drought, a group of villagers led by Jason (Harry H. Corbett) are hiding grain in a cave; despite posting a lookout, soldiers from the castle appear without warning and take it. Strangers in the area Robin and Little John are blamed by the villagers and flee. Jason seeks out Robin for help to find out how they were betrayed before another innocent person is blamed by the villagers. Villagers include Geoffrey Bayldon, Rowland Bartrop, and Leonard Sharp.
87	11	"The Mark"	Robert Day	Robert Newman	17 November 1957
Friar Tuck takes Robin, Little John and Derwent to visit master stone mason Walter (Philip Ray) with his apprentice Diccon (Kenneth Cope), who are at work rebuilding a ruined church for Sir Blaise De Roche (Charles Gray), but the Lord has plans to fortify the building and holds Walter prisoner until he agrees to the modifications. The outlaws rescue the mason to ensure the structure stays a holy one.
88	12	"The Bride of Robin Hood"	Anthony Squire	Oliver Skene (pseudonym of Ring Lardner, Jr.)	24 November 1957
Brenda (Billie Whitelaw), after saving Robin from the Sheriff's men, is voted a member of Robin's band. Brenda believes it her destiny to marry a hero and she becomes a distraction to Robin's men. He is railroaded into agreeing to marry her. Maid Marian is not amused, especially after being robbed by Brenda, and decides Robin must reunite her with Walter Neville (Ronald Allen), her betrothed.
89	13	"To Be A Student"	Robert Day	Sidney B. Wells	1 December 1957
Rolfe (Paul Eddington), to avoid his son Jack (Roger Bizley) having to join Prince John's army, bribes Master Bement (Hugh Moxey) to make sure the scholarly Peter Larkin (Derek Waring) is taken instead. Robin ensures fair play.
90	14	"The Challenge of the Black Knight"	Anthony Squire	Leon Griffiths	8 December 1957
On his 14th birthday, Will Dale (Richard O'Sullivan), the son of Ned, a member of Robin's gang, meets Robin and goes hunting with Little John; a confrontation with the Black Knight, Sir Roger Fitzwilliam (John Arnatt), leads to Robin being challenged to a duel with the Knight.
91	15	"The Rivals"	Robert Day	Leslie Poynton	15 December 1957
The Sheriff wants to charge a protection tax from travellers through Sherwood forest; knowing this will be unpopular, he comes up with a rival gang, to rob and attack travellers, made up of prisoners. His Seneschal (Paul Eddington) suggests the prisoners are led by Dick Banks (Carl Bernard). When Friar Tuck is robbed by a prisoner he knows, Robin has Tuck join the Nottingham traders guild to discover the Sheriff's plans that include betraying the robbers.
92	16	"The Christmas Goose"	Don Chaffey	Oliver Skene (pseudonym of Ring Lardner, Jr.)	22 December 1957
Davey's (Jon Whiteley) goose, Matilda, nips a Lord's horse, causing him to be thrown. The Lord, Sir Leon (Jack Watling), puts the animal on trial, as he hopes to condemn the goose to death – for his Christmas dinner. Friar Tuck is called on by Davey and unsuccessfully defends the goose. Robin addresses the problem by making the Lord's young daughter Susan's (Jane Asher) Christmas Day miserable.
93	17	"A Village Wooing"	Bernard Knowles	Neil R. Collins	27 December 1957
Robin tries to help Wat Longfellow (Leslie Phillips), who became an outlaw to escape a life of indentured servitude, win the hand of the independent widow Winifred (Betty Impey), but the wily Bailiff Baldwin (Donald Pleasence) also desires her. Introductory minstrel song: "Many reasons have been claimed, for joining Robin's merry band; the stranger was a lad who aimed to win his true love's hand!"
94	18	"The Profiteer"	Terry Bishop	Samuel B. West	29 December 1957
Andrew (Gordon Jackson) a serf, arrives in Nottingham to obtain grain to feed the villagers of Lothan, as their crops have failed. Robin gives him the money to buy the grain and he impresses a grain farmer, Hodges (John Longden), who is looking for a good man to marry his daughter, Margaret (Barbara Archer), thinking Andrew a 'freeman'. To buy his freedom, he is tempted to sell the grain at a vast profit until Robin helps put things on the right path.
95	19	"Knight Errant"	Anthony Squire	Michael Connor	5 January 1958
Marian's father has rewarded a knight for saving his life with her hand in marriage. A jealous Robin has to see off the roguish gold digger Sir Jack of Southwark (William Lucas) who makes an impression on Marian and the Sheriff does not want Sir Jack marrying Marian and accuses him of murder.
96	20	"The Healing Hand"	Bernard Knowles	Leon Griffiths	12 January 1958
Oswald (Michael Ripper), a 'quack' pedlar of phoney medicine, befriends Little John, but the outlaw comes to grief when he defends the 'quack' against Baron Barclay's (Bryan Coleman) tax collectors at Bingham fair and is imprisoned. Oswald and Robin must convince Barclay he is ill to get the key to Little John's cell.
97	21	"One Man's Meat"	Don Chaffey	George & Gertrude Fass	19 January 1958
Sir Edmund Woodstock (Robin Bailey) demonstrates his 'Ambrosia Nova' (the Food of the Gods) to Thadeus Goldfinch (Kevin Stoney), Robin and Friar Tuck. Goldfinch storms out unimpressed with it as human food, and his serfs on the same diet are weakening. Robin and Friar Tuck with the help of a donkey and Goldfinch's pigs find a more receptive audience for the foodstuff.
98	22	"Castle in the Air"	Peter Maxwell	Oliver Skene (pseudonym of Ring Lardner, Jr.)	26 January 1958
Robin and Marian are invited to Sir Richard of the Lea and his wife Lady Leonia's (Patricia Burke) 25th wedding anniversary when Sir Adrian (David Oxley) arrives at Sir Richard of the Lea's castle and he falls for a rigged game of dice called 'Lucky 13', in which he loses the deeds to his castle to Sir Adrian. Robin gets the Sheriff to restore the status quo, but not before he tries to take the deeds. Note: Last appearance of Sir Richard of the Lee (Ian Hunter).
99	23	"Too Many Robins"	Robert Day	John Dyson	2 February 1958
Alma (Susan Stephen) of the Golden Hind Inn is star struck for Robin Hood, so Tom the Thatcher (Derek Waring) tries to impress her by pretending to be her hero. The Sheriff's lieutenant (Edward Judd) is also interested in the girl. Robin and the band show Alma the 'reality' of everyday life in the outlaw camp.
100	24	"Roman Gold"	Peter Maxwell	Basil Dawson	16 February 1958
Dr Quince (George A. Cooper) is looking for Roman, Greek and Christian relics at the site of an old Roman villa, but everyone, including the Sheriff, believe he is seeking the fabled 'Treasure of Septim-us Superb-us'. Derwent accidentally damages a relic and the outlaws agree to assist at the dig while the Sheriff also sends men with the Doctor to assist. Derwent stumbles into a vault and discovers the treasure is more important than gold: Saint Paul's 1st letter to the Romans.
101	25	"The Ghost that Failed"	Peter Maxwell	Leon Griffiths	23 February 1958
Farmers led by Ralph (Kevin Stoney) are frightened off from digging storm ditches on Simon Dexter's (Rupert Davies) land by ghosts. Robin sends Friar Tuck and Little John to exorcise the ghosts. Little John is shot with a crossbow. Robin takes advantage to send the ghost of Little John to haunt Dexter, but heavy rain thwarts the plan.
102	26	"The Crusaders"	Gerry Bryant	Samuel B. West	2 March 1958
Sir Alan Beaumont (Bryan Coleman), a Crusader friend of Robin's, returns home just in time for a planned reunion with the other four knights, as he and Robin fought with in Acre, including Sir Paul (Julian Somers), but treachery awaits Robin in the castle of his old friend who has done a deal with the Sheriff to reclaim his castle forfeited while on the Crusades.
103	27	"The Youthful Menace"	Robert Day	Arthur Dales	9 March 1958
Marian's young cousin, the disinherited 16-year-old Edwin (Peter Kerr), arrives in Nottingham from France; he is scornful of the outlaws. He follows Marian to Robin's camp, and to keep his silence Robin must teach him to be a man by letting Edwin take him to the Sheriff as his prisoner.
104	28	"The Doctor"	Peter Seabourne	Leslie Poynton	16 March 1958
Little John suffers a bad fall breaking his leg and the local doctor is away, so he is taken to the home of Sir George Woodley (John Harvey), where an Italian doctor, Benvolio (Henry Vidon), is visiting. Betrayed, the doctor and Little John are arrested. Robin and Tuck's rescue attempt succeeds in rescuing the doctor, but not Little John. The Sheriff is badly wounded by Robin Hood and a bargain is made by the doctor to save both Little John and the Sheriff.
105	29	"The Double"	Gerry Bryant	Basil Dawson	22 March 1958
Prince John has ordered the Sheriff to kill Prince Arthur. Bolbec (John Gabriel) has found a double, Luke Tanner, for Robin Hood. The Sheriff hatches a plan for the double to kill the Prince. Lady Constance (Pamela Alan), Prince Arthur (Richard O'Sullivan) and their emissary (Richard Thorp) arrive in Sherwood and meet Robin Hood, who knows of the plans from Friar Tuck and has to save the Prince and Luke Tanner.
106	30	"At the Sign of the Blue Boar"	Ernest Bornemann	Sidney B. Wells	23 March 1958
When a Tailor, Master William Blount (Geoffrey Chater) covets the ownership of the Blue Boar Inn, The Sheriff places a 'head tax' on the owner Ulrich (Martin Wyldeck), forcing him to sell the Inn to Blount. Tn exchange, the Sheriff wants the Tailor to become an informer on Robin's outlaw gang. Robin, disguised as Sir Guy, puts matters straight. Opening scene chorus: Merry men singing at Blue Boar Inn: "Thar 'hue and cry' rang out my lads! They trailed us to the glen, the glen! The Sheriff's breath was lost my lads, on Sherwood's merry men! From out the noose we slithered loose his lordship fooled again, again! Thar 'hue and cry' rang out my lads! They trailed us to the glen, the glen! The Sheriff's breath was lost my lads, on Sherwood's merry men! So sing and send a cheery note bring out your billed and then and then, the Sheriff will n'er be called mein host, by Sherwood's Merry Men!"
107	31	"Quickness of the Hand"	Robert Day	R.W.Bogany	30 March 1958
The Sheriff issues a notice of a reward of 750 crowns for the capture of Robin Hood alive. Three bored knights Sir John (Brian Oulton), Sir Ralph (Richard Caldicot) and Sir Lawrence (Richard Pascoe) take up the offer and end up in Sherwood Forest disguised as magicians to perform a vanishing act: the capture of Robin Hood. Friar Tuck spies the Sheriff's men lying in wait and saves the day.
108	32	"Elixir of Youth"	Terry Bishop	Samuel B. West	6 April 1958
Sir Boland (Patrick Troughton) intends to sell his niece, Lady Mellisa (Anne Reid), who is in love with the lord's squire Alwyn (Kenneth Cope), for 500 crowns to old Sir Louis de Panay (Reginald Beckwith). Maid Marian and Tuck determine to stop him. From Tuck, Robin deduces that Sir Louis wants to regain his lost youth, and Robin conjures a phoney story and 'Elixir of Youth' to sell for 500 crowns.
109	33	"The Genius"	Peter Seabourne	Oliver Skene (pseudonym of Ring Lardner, Jr.)	13 April 1958
The Abbot (Charles Lloyd-Pack) calls on Friar Tuck to take Master Nicodemus (Harry H. Corbett), a fellow monk and master mathematician, to safety in Sherwood. Prince John has heard of his ideas on mathematics in warfare and wishes to take advantage of them. Count de Severne (Geoffrey Bayldon) has been sent to capture him and has taken his brother hostage. Robin puts the monk's intelligence to work on a mighty weapon that wins the day.
110	34	"The Fire"	Robert Day	Philip Bolsover	20 April 1958
During a heatwave, the Sheriff's men corner Derwent and Little John in a cave. The Lieutenant's (Paul Eddington) attempt to smoke them out leads to a forest fire, forcing Robin and the Sheriff to work together in a truce to save Sherwood and Nottingham but the Sheriff's word is tested when Robin is trapped under a fallen branch.
111	35	"The Minstrel"	Peter Seabourne	Leslie Poynton	27 April 1958
Marian brings Roland the Minstrel (Francis Matthews), exiled from London for derogatory songs about Prince John, to Sherwood. Prince John (Brian Haines) and the Ambassador of Aragon (Roger Delgado) are to visit Nottingham to sign a treaty, so the Sheriff locks up all strangers including the minstrel in order to avert any show of disrespect for authority in the area. Robin decides to use Roland's song about the Sheriff to his advantage. Soon all Nottingham is singing it (and adding new verses as it spreads). Robin rescues Roland and Friar Tuck organises the children (including Jane Asher) to sing for the Ambassador. Opening scene: Minstrel Roland sings song 1: "What is a body without a head and what is supper without good bread; the land needs more than a minstrel's poem. My King, my King, my King hurry home!". He then enquires about the Sheriff and improvises on request song 2: "Picture a pig all in braid and lace, a billy goat beard on a weasel's face; a snake for a sire (a male parent of a horse), a dog for a dam (a female horse), and that is the Sheriff of Nottingham!" Informed that the Sheriff robs he composes song 3: "Here is a man that can pick a purse, he robs the cradle he robs the hearse; his eye at your window, his thumb in your jamb, that's the greedy old Sheriff of Nottingham!"
112	36	"The Lottery"	Peter Seabourne	Peter Yeldham	4 May 1958
Two rafflers, Will Sharpe (Alfred Burke) and his accomplice Frisby (Ian Whittaker) arrive in Nottingham, with a fixed lottery game. When the Sheriff takes over the game, Robin, Marian and Tuck devise a plan to declare the Sheriff's lottery null and void and return the money to the people.
113	37	"Lincoln Green"	Terry Bishop	Neil R. Collins	11 May 1958
The ex-employee of David (Geoffrey Chater), Master Draper of Lincoln, named Simon Shanks (Charles Houston) tries to sell inferior Lincoln green cloth to the band, but his wares are rejected. In revenge, he reports their whereabouts to the Sheriff. Robin, Marian and Little John go to Lincoln. Robin and Little John are captured by the Sheriff and imprisoned in the tower of Lincoln Castle. Marian devises a plan using a bolt of cloth, a sling, and a spindle made by David to rescue Robin and John.
114	38	"Women's War"	Peter Seabourne	Philip Bolsover	18 May 1958
Anne De Brissac (Zena Walker) asks the outlaws to help her with a box full of gold she claims is intended for King Richard. Marian informs Robin that the Lady is on the side of Prince John. Little John and Ned, who have gone to collect the gold, go missing. It is up to Marian to force the truth from Anne, before the Sheriff closes the trap.
115	39	"Little Mother"	Terry Bishop	Philip Bolsover	25 May 1958
The Duke of Retford (Charles Houston) sets a trap for Little John, when he goes to see his injured mother (Renée Houston). Despite Friar Tuck and Maid Marian's warning Little John is captured and Robin and the band rush to his aid. Note: Desmond Llewelyn, "Q" in the James Bond films, appears as "Two Fingers".
116	40	"Marian's Prize"	Peter Seabourne	Louis Marks	1 June 1958
Marian enters an archery contest in place of Robin. Prince John (Donald Pleasence), visiting Northeave village, ups the prize money to 20 crowns, hoping to draw in Robin Hood. Marian (disguised as "Martin") wins the contest, but Robin (disguised as "Hugh") is tempted and challenges Martin, not realising Prince John is waiting.
117	41	"Farewell to Tuck"	Terry Bishop	Arthur Dales	22 June 1958
The Sheriff tries to convince the Archbishop (Carl Bernard) to move Friar Tuck to another parish, but he doesn't bargain for the Archbishop's knowledge of Robin Hood, or his faith in Friar Tuck.

=== Series 4 (1958–59) ===
No. overall	No. in series	Title	Directed by	Written by	Original release date
118	1	"Sybella"	Terry Bishop	Michael Connor	14 September 1958
Baron Oslow (David Davies) murders the Earl of Steyne and steals his identity. The Juggler Ali (Michael Peake) overhears him plotting with the Sheriff to sail to the Holy Land and kill King Richard. Ali is also killed. Ali's partner Sybella (Soraya Rafat), who has an amazing memory but can hardly speak English, tries to warn Robin. However, it is Maid Marian who falls foul of the false Earl of Steyne. Note: Although Robin's dialogue refers to Ali as a Juggler, it is clear that he is meant to be a Jongleur, as he performs magic tricks in the episode, and no juggling.
119	2	"The Lady-Killer"	Terry Bishop	Jan Read	21 September 1958
Re-intro for Will Scarlet (Paul Eddington). Will returns with a Lady Maud (Geraldine Hagan), daughter of De Sarigny, in tow and an advanced Saracen crossbow that can outshoot a longbow. Accused of kidnapping, he is captured by the Sheriff and sentenced to hang. Scarlet bargains for his life by demonstrating the crossbow. Marian informs Robin and he believes the Sheriff plans to double cross Scarlet.
120	3	"A Touch of Fever"	Peter Seabourne	Leon Griffiths	28 September 1958
Sir Nigel (John Carson), Lady Marian's cousin, returns from the holy land with two friends and intends to marry her to obtain her land. Discovering Marian is in league with the outlaws, he threatens to expose her to the Sheriff unless she agrees to marriage. Robin and Sir Nigel's friends have to convince the Sheriff that he is mentally unbalanced with the fever.
121	4	"Tuck's Love Day"	Terry Bishop	Alan Hackney	5 October 1958
Sir Geoffrey (Basil Dignam) returns from the Crusades and finds the Sheriff has moved the stream that forms the boundary marker of his estate, so that his land now forms part of the Sheriff's own land. The Abbot is displeased with Friar Tuck's lack of alms collected so Tuck arbitrates the dispute on Love Day, a day in the year when ecclesiastical law takes precedence, for a fee, while Robin and Will Scarlet breach a dam. Note: This episode, apart from three or so studio scenes, is shot almost entirely on location.
122	5	"The Flying Sorcerer"	Bernard Knowles	Palmer Thompson	12 October 1958
Lord Giles (Anthony Jacobs) arrives in Nottingham to uncover tax evasions. To avoid more tax problems, the Sheriff puts forward a plan to have the eccentric Lord Eilmar (Arthur Howard) accused of being a sorcerer, and his lands given over to Lord Giles. Marian tries to help, but Eilmar is arrested and Robin comes to his aid, and the eccentric Lord's interest in flight comes to Robin's aid as a kite.
123	6	"The Loaf"	Peter Seabourne	Philip Bolsover	19 October 1958
A boy steals a loaf of bread from the Sheriff's men. Friar Tuck gives him sanctuary in the local church, but after 40 days, under the law of sanctuary, the boy will have to leave the country. The Sheriff demands 500 loaves to free the boy by the next midday. Robin devises a plan to obtain the Sheriff's supply of flour to fulfil the demand.
124	7	"Six Strings to his Bow"	Terry Bishop	Raymond Bowers	26 October 1958
Intro Sir Alan-a-Dale (Richard Coleman), who is unaware that Prince John has accused him of murder and declared an outlaw. In warning Sir Alan, Marian is wounded by a crossbow bolt, threatening to reveal her identity to the pursuing Sheriff. Opening scene: Song by minstrel Sir Alan-a-Dale with harp: "The sign of the Blue Boar, hangs beyond the door; the serving girl called Joan, has left me to drink alone!"
125	8	"The Devil You Don't Know"	Peter Seabourne	Owen Holder	2 November 1958
The Sheriff of Nottingham is preparing to leave for three months' duty in London. Sir Alan-a-Dale (Richard Coleman) is missing from Robin's camp and presumed held captive by the Sheriff. Robin and Will Scarlet intercept the Deputy Sheriff and free a prisoner, the mysterious Ralph of Plumtree, and he insists on impersonating the Deputy Sheriff to discover if Sir Alan is a prisoner. The Deputy Sheriff lays a trap for both Robin and Marian. Note: Last appearance of the Sheriff of Nottingham (Alan Wheatley) and intro of the Deputy Sheriff (John Arnatt).
126	9	"Goodbye Little John"	Robert Day	Raymond Bowers	9 November 1958
Little John returns to Sherwood Forest and finds his place in Robin's band taken by Will Scarlet. The Deputy Sheriff offers Little John a pardon.
127	10	"Hostage for a Hangman"	Peter Seabourne	Arthur Dales	16 November 1958
The Deputy Sheriff tells Robin, during a truce, that he will hang two serfs everyday until Robin gives himself up. Robin calls on Marian's guests, two lords who outrank the Deputy Sheriff, Alford (Humphrey Lestocq) and Beaumont (Jack Melford) to make the Deputy Sheriff show his true colours by dressing them as serfs and hanging them first.
128	11	"Hue and Cry"	Compton Bennett	Alan Hackney	23 November 1958
The Deputy Sheriff's is attacked and his chain of office stolen in Lower Fitzwalter, a village of freemen. At the blacksmith of William (Kevin Stoney) hue and cry is invoked under the rule of Frankpledge and, if the attacker cannot be found, nine men will hang. Robin, Marian, her maid Jenny (Geraldine Hagan) who had teased Dick (Ronald Hines) the Swineherd, the thief, provide the solution.
129	12	"The Reluctant Rebel"	Peter Seabourne	Leon Griffiths	30 November 1958
Sir Geoffrey (John Carson) and his serf Herbert (Leslie Phillips) pose as outlaw Jim Stark and his lieutenant to join Robin's gang for information on the outlaw life for Sir Geoffrey's journals.
130	13	"The Oath"	Compton Bennett	Arthur Dales	7 December 1958
The Deputy Sheriff tries to turn the Archbishop (Carl Bernard) against Friar Tuck, implicating him with the outlaws. Tuck takes an oath in front of the Archbishop not to reveal the identity or the location of the Sheriff's latest prisoner, an envoy of King Richard, about to be hung and Tuck cannot break his oath and tell Robin to save the man, so he calls a special service at the church.
131	14	"The Debt"	Anthony Squire	Leon Griffiths	14 December 1958
A former Crusader friend of Robin's, Martin (Brian Rawlinson), who saved his life seven years before at the crusade, masquerades as one of Robin's gang and begins robbing travellers entering Sherwood forest, including Friar Tuck, and fatally wounding John Dale (Terry Yorke) in his home. Martin wants to join Robin's band. When Martin learns Friar Tuck and Marian know Robin, he has the upper hand. Robin has to make him leave, bearing in mind the debt he owes this man.
132	15	"The Charm Pedlar"	Peter Seabourne	Alan Hackney	14 December 1958
A charm peddler named Hugo (Victor Maddern) arrives in Nottingham. Lady Marian takes against him for getting the locals to waste their money on his phoney potions. She gets the Deputy Sheriff involved to arrest Hugo. Robin, at the behest of Friar Tuck, disguises himself as a fellow con-man to investigate the peddler's activities and finds himself rounded up with the charm peddler in the Sheriff's dungeon, both to be hanged, to Marian's horror.
133	16	"The Bagpiper"	Terry Bishop	Jan Read	21 December 1958
Duncan of Stoneykirk (Hugh McDermott) makes a return visit to Sherwood forest, still with an eye for Marian, only this time he has a plan to win a bagpiping contest against Tam McKinnon (Andrew Downie) at the castle of Sir Fulke (Patrick Troughton), or so he claims. Robin, dressed in highland garb and beard, accompanies him. Duncan's intention is revealed, although Duncan is wounded in the process.
134	17	"The Parting Guest"	Terry Bishop	Louis Marks	28 December 1958
Still hanging around Robin's camp, Duncan turns his attentions to the Lady Marian until his lassie Jessie (Ellen McIntosh) arrives to take Duncan back home. With Duncan refusing to leave Robin, Robin tries to woo Jessie to make him jealous, but it is Marian who is jealous. Robin arranges an archery contest between Marian and Jessie for five gold crowns to set Duncan on the road to Scotland.
135	18	"A Race Against Time"	Terry Bishop	Arthur Dales	4 January 1959
Will Scarlet witnesses the murder of an envoy. He and Robin capture Wilfred (Michael Ripper) who had led the envoy into the trap. They discover that the killer was Sir Hartley (David Davies) who intends to kill Constance, Duchess of Brittany (Patricia Marmont) and Prince Arthur (Jonathan Bailey) as they pass through Sherwood to Northumberland.
136	19	"The Pharaoh Stones"	Gordon Parry	William Templeton	11 January 1959
Little John acquires 'The Pharaoh Stones', stones that predict the future, from a peddler (Carl Bernard), and falls under their superstitious influence. The band is also convinced. Robin devises a plan with Will and Marian to break their spell, but it leads to Little John's capture.
137	20	"Bride For An Outlaw"	Gordon Parry	Louis Marks	18 January 1959
To avoid capture by the Sheriff, Robin is forced into a proxy marriage, performed by Friar Tuck, to Judith Denton (Mary Mason), the daughter of wealthy merchant Master Bligh Denton (John Horsley) who mistakes Robin for her real suitor Sir Peter Marston (Nigel Davenport).
138	21	"Double Trouble"	Terry Bishop	Louis Marks	25 January 1959
Friar Tuck's twin brother Edgar returns to Nottingham. The Deputy Sheriff imprisons Tuck and forces his brother Edgar to impersonate him, for the purpose of confessing his brother's 'sin' (of aiding Robin) and denouncing Maid Marian to the Bishop (Charles Lloyd-Pack). Robin has to match the Deputy Sheriff's duplicity by capturing the Bishop and the Sheriff.
139	22	"Trapped"	Terry Bishop	Wilton Schiller	1 February 1959
Robin becomes the latest victim of Sir Hugo DeBask (Laurence Hardy), a lord who arrests travellers through his estate and sets them to work on his lands if they can't pay the fine he imposes at their trial. Looking for him, Marian also falls into the trap. Escape comes from an unexpected quarter. Note: Laurence Hardy's character is incorrectly billed as Sir Marmot on the end titles.
140	23	"The Champion"	Gordon Parry	Leon Griffiths	8 February 1959
Marian has been informed by the Deputy Sheriff that her father has died in the Holy Land and Prince John has nominated Sir Guy Quentin (John Horsley) to take over her estate. Friar Tuck informs Marian her father is alive and she can appeal to the courts. Marian's sixty-year-old uncle Sir Percy (Jack Allen) pre-empts this by challenging the much younger Quentin to a duel and Robin has to convince Quentin that Sir Percy is a fearsome fighter.
141	24	"The Edge and the Point"	Gordon Parry	Raymond Bowers	15 February 1959
Boland (Michael Gough), a former Crusader, defeats Will Scarlet and then Robin Hood in a sword fight and is only prevented from killing him by Maid Marian's prowess with the bow. Boland offers his services to the Deputy Sheriff, who makes him his lieutenant and takes sword-fighting lessons so he can kill Robin Hood himself and take the glory and become Sheriff. Robin Hood accepts the challenge in the hope of revealing the Deputy Sheriff's true colours.
142	25	"A Bushel of Apples"	Terry Bishop	Jan Read	22 February 1959
While Lord Ambrose is away at the Crusade, Sir Watkyn of Parstock (Harry H. Corbett) his bailiff, has been extorting heavy taxes from the tenants and serfs on his estate with menaces. Friar Tuck seeks Robin's help, but is arrested as an outlaw. Robin contacts Father Ignatius (Philip Latham), Lord Ambrose's priest, and with his aid puts paid to Watkyns' underhanded schemes.
143	26	"The Truce"	Gordon Parry	Leon Griffiths	1 March 1959
Needing to win an archery tournament against Lord Repton (Richard Caldicot), the Deputy Sheriff parleys a truce with Robin to be his archer for the day. His opponent is Mark Crispin (Derek Tansley), champion bowman of England.

Having moved the game show Name That Tune from Tuesday nights to Monday nights at 7.30pm for the 1958 fall season, CBS screened the fourth series in the US on Saturday mornings at 11.30am. After several re-runs, which started on 4 October 1958, the final episodes were transmitted between 10 January and 26 September 1959.

== Home media ==
=== VHS releases ===
ITC Home Video (UK) released three double tape editions of the series:

- "The Beginning" (14 October 1991) containing "The Coming of Robin Hood", "The Moneylender", "Dead or Alive", "Friar Tuck", "Maid Marian", "A Guest For The Gallows". 152 mins.
- "The Challenge" (10 February 1992) containing "The Knight Who Came to Dinner", "Queen Eleanor", "Checkmate", "The Ordeal", "The Inquisitor", "The Challenge". 152 mins (ITC 8101).
- "The Thieves Den" (22 June 1992) containing "Pepper", "A Tuck in Time", "The Charter", "The Salt King". 100 mins (ITC 8102)

Network Video (UK) released videotape PAL versions beginning in 2003.

Marathon Music and Video (US) released 21 VHS tapes of the series in 2000 (two episodes per tape in a random order).

=== DVD releases ===
The Adventures of Robin Hood has been released by many companies, as under English law TV transmissions are only protected by broadcast copyright for a period of 50 years (due to the Copyright Act of 1956), hence all the episodes had ceased to be in copyright by 2009 so far as the broadcaster is concerned. Scriptwriters, composers, musicians and actors retain copyright in their respective contributions to each episode for a much longer period, but such rights generally are not enforceable by the broadcaster, hence their enforcement tends to be non-existent in practice.

In Universal Region ALL NTSC format, Mill Creek Entertainment released all four seasons on DVD between 18 March 2008 and 25 August 2009, and eventually released a complete series set on 25 August 2009 – 143 episodes on 11 discs. The films have been mainly sourced from poor quality American prints, though some are from better quality European sources. Some episodes feature the "Adventures in Sherwood Forest" opening titles and a few are CBS syndicated prints. In addition, three episodes: "Farewell To Tuck", "The Charm Pedlar", "The Parting Guest" have no on-screen titles at all.

In Region 0 NTSC format, Alpha Video in the USA released twenty-two DVDs of various episodes from the series, each disc containing four episodes (88 episodes in total).

In Region 0 format, series 1 & 4, and in Region 2, series 2 & 3 in PAL format, Network released the complete series in the UK in four boxed sets of DVDs, licensed from the official copyright holder Granada Ventures. The first three series have 39 episodes each and are on five-disc sets, while the last series has 26 episodes and is on three discs. The films have been taken from original Archive prints and are of variable quality. Three episodes feature French opening and end title sequences and no on-screen titles: "Farewell To Tuck", "The Charm Pedlar", "The Parting Guest". One episode, "The Minstrel", has French opening titles but original English end titles and retains the episode title.

In NTSC format, the first series has been released by Edi video (2005), TMG (Timeless Media Group) as a three DVD boxed set (2005) and by Pop Flix as a 4-disc collection (2010). Other US companies such as Genius Entertainment, Critics Choice, Nostalgia Ventures, East West Entertainment, Digiview Productions, PC Treasures Inc, Echo Bridge Entertainment, and PR studios have released limited runs on DVD.

In Region 2 in PAL format, KNM Home Entertainment has released, in Germany, three DVD sets containing the 26 episodes (a mix of series 1 and 2 episodes) that were dubbed into German and transmitted by ARD between 1971 and 1974.

A complete series 18-disc box set was released by Network DVD in December 2011 in Region 2.

Series	No. of episodes	Originally aired:		DVD releases		
Series	No. of episodes	Premiered	Ended	Universal Region 0 / PAL	Universal Region ALL / NTSC	
1	39	25 September 1955	23 June 1956	30 June 2003; 3 March 2008 [Network DVD (UK)]	Complete Series; 25 August 2009 [Mill Creek Entertainment (US)]	18 March 2008 [Mill Creek (US)]
2	37	10 August 1956	9 June 1957	30 June 2003, 26 April 2004, 1 December 2008 [Network DVD (UK)]	Complete Series; 25 August 2009 [Mill Creek Entertainment (US)]	14 October 2008[Mill Creek (US)]
3	41	6 September 1957	22 June 1958	18 October 2004; 1 November 2008 [Network DVD (UK)]	Complete Series; 25 August 2009 [Mill Creek Entertainment (US)]	31 March 2009[Mill Creek (US)]
4	26	14 September 1958	1 March 1959	24 January 2005[Network DVD (UK)]	Complete Series; 25 August 2009 [Mill Creek Entertainment (US)]	25 August 2009[Mill Creek (US)]
