= Middle Wood, Offton =

Biological site in Suffolk, England

Coordinates: 52.109°N 1.005°E

- Site of Special Scientific Interest
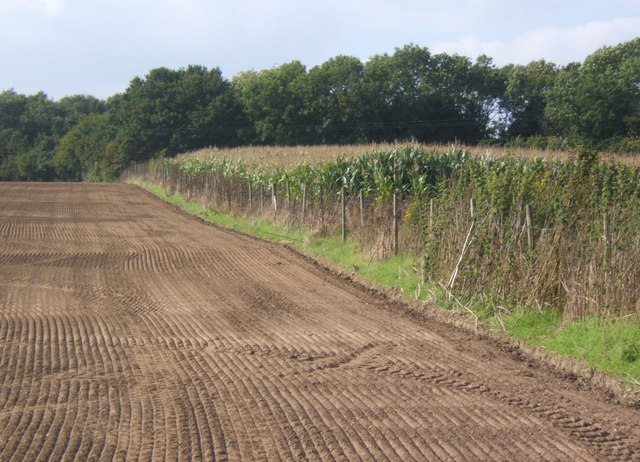
- Location of Middle Wood, Offton.
- Area of search: Suffolk
- Grid reference: TM 059 499
- Interest: Biological
- Area: 23.3 hectares
- Notification date: 1985
- Location map: Magic Map

Middle Wood, Offton is a 23.3-hectare (58-acre) biological Site of Special Scientific Interest north-west of Offton in Suffolk.

This is a medieval coppice with standards wood on wet boulder clay, and it has very diverse ground flora, including species typical of ancient woodland. Oak is the main standard tree, and there are orchids such as common twayblade, early purple orchid and butterfly orchid.

There is access by a footpath from Offton.
