= Max Anderson (director) =

British documentary filmmaker (1914–1959)

- Born: Maxim Anderson; April 25, 1914; London, England
- Died: July 10, 1959 (aged 45)
- Education: Sloane School; University of Cambridge
- Occupations: Film director, producer
- Years active: 1936–1959
- Known for: The Harvest Shall Come; Four Men in Prison; Daybreak in Udi
- Notable work: The Harvest Shall Come (1942); Out of the Night (1941); Four Men in Prison (1950); Treasure at the Mill (1957)

Maxim Anderson (25 April 1914 in London, England – 10 July 1959) was a British director and producer of documentaries. He worked with the GPO Film Unit from 1936 onwards, and later changed to Crown Film Unit. He directed documentaries such as The Harvest Shall Come (1942) and Four Men in Prison (1950).

== Biography ==
Max Anderson was born on 25 April 1914, the son of artist Stanley Anderson and Lillian Phelps. He was educated at Sloane School and Cambridge University He joined the GPO Film Unit in 1936 at age 22, and became a director. Soon after the start of World War II the GPO Film Unit became the Crown Film Unit (CFU) under the Ministry of Information. In 1940, Anderson joined the Realist Film Unit (RFU). He directed Out of the Night for the RFU in 1941. The film documents the training of blind people so they can follow interesting and useful careers.

Anderson's 1942 documentary for Imperial Chemical Industries, The Harvest Shall Come gave a history of post-Victorian farmers, discussed the effect of the change from an agricultural economy to one based on industry, and gave a cautiously optimistic view of post-war agriculture. The 35-minute documentary, with music by William Alwyn, was sponsored by the Ministry of Information. The Harvest Shall Come was entirely filmed on location, including the interior scenes. It was named "Documentary of the Month" by Documentary News Letter, which called it "the first genuine story film made with the documentary purpose and by documentary method." It has been called "a far-sighted educational treatment of a major social problem."

In 1943 Anderson directed the 20-minute Words and Actions for the RFU. Words and Actions, produced by John Taylor, was made for the British Commercial Gas Association. It stressed the need for total co-operation in war time.

The CFU produced the first six issues of Mining Review for the National Coal Board in 1947. Anderson directed several of the Mining Review stories in October–December 1947. In 1949 Anderson produced Daybreak in Udi for the Crown Film Unit, directed by Terry Bishop. The film documented the construction of a maternity hospital in a village in Eastern Nigeria. The 40-minute film, again with music by William Alwyn, was a 1948 Academy Award Winner. Savage World (1954), directed by Terry Bishop, is a two part 64-minute film. The first part deals with efforts to conserve wildlife in Africa against the opposition of local poachers, and the second part uses most of the material from Daybreak in Udi.

In 1950 Anderson directed Four Men in Prison, one of three feature-length documentaries produced that year by John Grierson for the CFU. Another was The Dancing Fleece directed by Frederick Wilson. Four Men in Prison and The Dancing Fleece caused widespread controversy. Anderson's film "disappeared under a ban of official disapproval." Anderson directed the cartoon documentary Every Five Minutes in 1951, covering fire prevention. He directed Treasure at the Mill in 1957 for the Children's Film Foundation. This was an action adventure film for children.

Anderson died on 10 July 1959, aged 45. A tribute ceremony was held in his honour on 31 January 1960 at the National Film Theatre. Caught in the Net, written by Max Anderson, was released in 1960. It is a children's film based on Sutherland Ross's novel The Lazy Salmon Mystery. (Note: "Sutherland Ross" was the pseudonym of Thomas Henry Callard (1912–1984).)

== Filmography ==
=== As director ===
- Out of the Night (1941)
- The Harvest Shall Come (1942)
- Words and Actions (1943)
- Mining Review series (October – December 1947):
  - Bestwood Training Centre (October 1947)
  - Open Cast Mining (October 1947)
  - Workington Football (October 1947)
  - Welsh Debate (October 1947)
  - Swadlincote (November 1947)
  - The Forrest of Dean (December 1947)
  - Shepherds from the mine (December 1947)
  - Denby Washery (December 1947)
- Four Men in Prison (1950) 40 minutes.
- Every Five Minutes (1951)
- Treasure at the Mill (1957)

=== As producer ===
- Daybreak in Udi (1949)
- Savage World (1954)

=== As writer ===
- Caught in the Net (1960)
