= Four Men in Prison =

1950 English documentary film by Max Anderson

- Directed by: Max Anderson
- Written by: Mark Benney
- Produced by: John Grierson
- Production company: Crown Film Unit
- Release date: 1950
- Running time: 41 minutes
- Country: England
- Language: English
- Budget: £16,000

Four Men In Prison is a 1950 semi-documentary short film about English prison conditions directed by Max Anderson and produced by John Grierson. Filmed at Wakefield Prison, it was commissioned for the purpose of educating people involved in criminal justice.

The film was criticised for being inaccurate and sensational, and was quickly withdrawn.

== Production ==
The film was made for educational purposes by the Central Office of Information to be shown privately to magistrates and others who were involved in administering criminal justice.The Home Office initiated production of the film, which cost £16,000. It was one of three produced under Donald Taylor at the Crown Film Unit and completed in 1950.

== Synopsis ==
The film deals with penology. It is semi-documentary. It depicts the impact that living in prison has on four very different offenders. One is serving a short sentence for a first-time offence, one is a youthful thief who is mentally sub-normal, one is being given training to prevent him from turning into a habitual criminal and the fourth is a hardened criminal who knows the ropes of prison existence.

== Reception ==
The film was aired for the first time at a magistrate's conference. The reaction was immediate and public, with the film condemned for inaccuracy and sensationalism. The magistrates said the first offender and the mentally defective thief would not in fact have been sentenced in jail. The film "disappeared under a ban of official disapproval."

== Cast ==
- William Mervyn
- Arthur Mullard as prison officer
- Johnny Singer as Edward Hope
- Ian Sadler as Henry Pectable
- Cameron Hall as Stephen Laggerty
- Oscar Quitak as Albert Oddy

== Sources ==
- Birch, Nigel (15 December 1950). "The following pieces of information have been extracted from various Ministers ..." The Spectator.
- "COI Collection Vol 1 - Police and Thieves". Amazon. 15 February 2010.
- Ellis, Jack C. (1989). The Documentary Idea: A Critical History of English-Language Documentary Film and Video. Prentice Hall. ISBN 978-0-13-217142-7.
- Ellis, Jack C. (2000). John Grierson: Life, Contributions, Influence. SIU Press. ISBN 978-0-8093-2242-8.
- Ellis, Jack C.; McLane, Betsy A. (2005). A New History of Documentary Film. Continuum. ISBN 978-0-8264-1750-3.
- Enticknap, Leo Douglas Graham (1999). The Non-fiction Film in Britain, 1945-51. University of Exeter.
- Fox, Lionel W. (1952). The English Prison and Borstal Systems. Routledge. ISBN 978-1-136-26638-6.
