= The Harvest Shall Come =

- John Slater as the farm laborer Tom Grimwood in The Harvest Shall Come
- Directed by: Max Anderson
- Written by: H. W. Freeman
- Produced by: Basil Wright
- Cinematography: A.E. Jeakins
- Music by: William Alwyn
- Production company: Realist Films
- Release date: 1942
- Running time: 33 minutes
- Country: United Kingdom
- Language: English

The Harvest Shall Come is a 1942 British documentary film about agricultural work between 1900 and World War II, using the story of a farm laborer to illustrate the importance of agriculture, and the importance of supporting workers in this occupation. The film, produced by Basil Wright and directed by Max Anderson, was well received.

== Production ==
The Harvest Shall Come was entirely filmed on location, including the interior scenes. The film was mostly shot at Hill House Farm, Needham Market in Suffolk. Other scenes were filmed at Badley Hall and in Willisham. Many of the extras were local people. The 33-minute documentary, with music by William Alwyn, was sponsored by the Ministry of Information. The Harvest Shall Come was made for Imperial Chemical Industries, and makes the case for fertilizing the soil to improve productivity.

== Synopsis ==
The opening titles appear over scenes of farm workers stacking hay. In 1900, Tom Grimwood as a boy leaves his family cottage, carrying his trunk to take a job on a farm for a weekly wage of 2/6 plus keep. The commentary notes that farm workers receive the lowest pay and worst housing of all workers, but that there had been improvements since 1870. Tom is taught to work the plough, the harrow and other horse-drawn machinery, and learns skills such as milking and scything.

At the age of 21, Tom gets a new job, which pays 14/- a week and comes with a run-down cottage, so he can afford to marry his sweetheart. The couple have three small children, but still have no sink in the cottage.

In the First World War (1914–18), farm workers manage to gain better wages. After the war, despite the promises of politicians, wages sink to just 30/- per week. Although Tom wants to leave for a better job, he cannot afford to move from the cottage. The film shows that in the interwar period standards of living in the country generally improved, but agricultural wages declined when imported corn depressed prices. Tom is laid off for a while and forced to dig ditches "on relief". His son decides to move to the town, where there are better opportunities.

With the outbreak of the Second World War in 1939, imports are restricted and as much land as possible must be brought under cultivation. Agricultural labor conditions improve again and wages rise to 60/- a week, although prices also rise. A radio announcer says that the government will look after farm workers. Tom's wife is skeptical, saying "They said all that in the last war".

The film ends with scenes illustrating the importance of agriculture around the world.

== Reception ==
The Spectator said the film was "an excellent piece of work, notable for its effective and truthful presentation of the vital subject of life in this country on the land." The Harvest Shall Come was named "Documentary of the Month" by Documentary News Letter, which called it "the first genuine story film made with the documentary purpose and by documentary method." It praised Max Anderson as one of the best documentary makers to appear for many years and called John Slater "an outstanding interpreter of working class character." Sir Arthur Elton of the films division of the Ministry of Information said in 1943 that the film was one of the best documentary films that had been produced. The Harvest Shall Come has been called "a far-sighted educational treatment of a major social problem."

== Cast ==
- John Slater: Tom Grimwood
- Eileen Beldon: Lil
- Victor Woolf: Bill
- Ernest Borrow: Squire
- Richard George: Farmer
- Edmund Willard: Commentator
- Bruce Belfrage: Commentator

== See also ==
- The Battle of the Harvests, a 1942 Canadian documentary
