= Daybreak in Udi =

1949 British film by Terry Bishop

- Entire film
- Directed by: Terry Bishop
- Produced by: Max Anderson; John Taylor
- Cinematography: Fred Gamage
- Production company: Crown Film Unit
- Distributed by: Colonial Office
- Release date: 15 August 1949
- Running time: 47 minutes
- Country: Nigeria
- Languages: English; Igbo

Daybreak in Udi is a 1949 British documentary film directed by Terry Bishop about cultural changes in Udi, Enugu State, Nigeria. The film won the Academy Award for Best Documentary Feature in 1950.

== Synopsis ==
In 1949 Colonial Nigeria undergoes identity crisis, a clash between the progressive, educated elements of society - those who desire westernization and modernity- and traditionalists who want to maintain Nigerian heritage. Two young African teachers, Iruka and Dominic demand that Udi village should have a maternity home to serve as a symbol of progressiveness and modernization. The British District Officer, E.R. Chadwick, after some persuasion agrees to provide the resources for the project. Chadwick wants to ensure that everyone in the village is on board for the task, however, Eze, an elderly resident opposes the decision asserting that building the maternity home is both an affront to the tradition and culture of the village, and he persuades others towards his view.

Chadwick visits the village to convince the villagers and succeeds. Work on the maternity home begins. Although it will prove a long and arduous process, the villagers came together to construct the building but were interrupted by Eze, who arrives at the building site and claims that it is an old burial ground. He predicts that the builders will invoke the ire of the ancestors for disturbing the site and violating custom. Cultural values quickly manifest. Fear and superstition briefly stop the work, but Chadwick and Dominic arrive to allay the workers' fears and restart the building project. However, Eze’s threat looms large in the back of their minds.

In time the building is complete, but before it is set to officially open, a young woman and her husband arrive in the village. The woman is in labor, and so Chadwick and the midwife (Joyce MgBaronye) agree to admit the woman as the home's first patient. That evening, while tending the woman, the midwife catches sight of movement and hears noises coming from outside. Frightened, she soon hears a knock at the door, but it turns out only to be Iruka coming to check up on the expectant mother. Relieved, the midwife resumes her work while Iruka sets a pot of water to boil on the fire. Shortly thereafter, there is another noise, and when looking out the window the midwife spots a masked figure peering in. Believing the masked figure to be a spirit of the ancestors, the midwife cries out in fear, but Iruka throws the boiling water onto the figure, revealing Eze, who flees back into the surrounding overgrowth.

The next day the villagers march up to the maternity home for the opening ceremony, a traditional one complete with dancing, music, singing, and native costumes. Chadwick takes the center seat in front of the maternity home to watch the events, with Eze sitting near him. Eze has finally accepted that tradition and progress, as visible in the final scene, can go together after all. In the closing narration, Chadwick tells the viewer that progress brings "power, spirit, unlimited and unknown possibilities and destinations" and suggests that progress should be the ultimate goal of native society.

== Cast ==
- E.R. Chadwick as E.R. Chadwick
- Hartford Anerobi as Dominic
- Fanny Elumeze as Iruka
- Oso Anichebe as Village Elder
- Josef Amalu as Eze
- Joyce Ngbaronye as Midwife
- Clement Emehel as James

== Awards ==
In 1950, the film won an Oscar at the Academy Awards for Best Documentary. It was the first Nigerian film to win an Oscar Award. It also received a BAFTA Award for Best Documentary Film.

== Bibliography ==
- Page, Ben (2014). "'And the Oscar Goes to… Daybreak in Udi ': Understanding Late Colonial Community Development and its Legacy through Film". Development and Change. 45 (5). doi:10.1111/dech.12119. ISSN 0012-155X.
