= H. W. Freeman =

English writer (1899-1994)

Harold Webber "Jack" Freeman (born Ilford, Greater London, England, 28 March 1899; died 18 February 1994) was an English writer best known for his works set among farmers and farm laborers in Suffolk, particularly his first novel Joseph and His Brethren (1928).

== Early life ==
The son of a schoolmaster, Freeman was educated at the City of London School. At the end of World War I he served a year in the Somerset Light Infantry and then went to Christ Church, Oxford on a scholarship and read classics. Although a qualified scholar, after college Freeman worked on a poultry farm his father owned in Carlton, Suffolk and on other farms in the area for several years. In 1924 he left farming and travelled abroad, chiefly in Italy.

== Career ==
Freeman wrote his most successful work, Joseph and His Brethen, first as a short story in 1926 and then expanded it into a novel while living in Florence during the winter of 1927 to 1928. Published that year, it became a best-seller in England and then in the United States, where it was a main selection of the recently founded Book of the Month Club. The favorable New York Times review compared it to the works of Thomas Hardy and Knut Hamsun.

Freeman continued to write novels set in rural Suffolk to less success, with his last published novel being The Poor Scholar's Tale (1954). He also provided the script for a short documentary film, The Harvest Shall Come (1942).

== Novels by Freeman ==
- Joseph and His Brethren (1928)
- Down in the Valley (1930)
- Fathers of Their People (1932)
- Pond Hall's Progress (1934; a sequel to Fathers of Their People)
- Hester and Her Family (1935)
- Andrew to the Lions (1938)
- Chaffinch's (1941) Published in the US as His Own Place.
- Blenheim Orange (1949)
- The Poor Scholar's Tale (1954)

== Personal life ==
Freeman married Elizabeth Boedecker (1902–1994), a German costume designer. They moved to Offton, Suffolk and lived in a former public house there, gardening and traveling around Europe by train and bicycle (Freeman despised cars and never learned to drive). He and his wife are buried in the churchyard of the Church of St. Mary in Offton.
