= The Adventures of Robin Hood (TV series) =

British television series (1955–1959)

- Genre: Drama; Adventure; Folklore; Period drama
- Based on: Traditional legends
- Written by: Ring Lardner Jr.; Ian McLellan Hunter
- Directed by: Terry Bishop
- Starring: Richard Greene; Bernadette O'Farrell; Patricia Driscoll; Alexander Gauge; Archie Duncan; Alan Wheatley; John Arnatt
- Opening theme: Edwin Astley
- Ending theme: Carl Sigman sung by Dick James
- Composers: Edwin Astley; Albert Elms
- Country of origin: United Kingdom
- Original language: English
- No. of series: 4
- No. of episodes: 143 (list of episodes)

Production
- Executive producer: Hannah Weinstein
- Producer: Sidney Cole
- Cinematography: Ken Hodges
- Editor: Joan Warwick
- Running time: 25 minutes
- Production company: Sapphire Films

Original release
- Network: ATV London
- Release: 25 September 1955 – 1 March 1959

The Adventures of Robin Hood is a British television series comprising 143 half-hour, black-and-white episodes broadcast weekly from 25 September 1955 (Note: First broadcast in UK by ATV London. See: TV Transmission dates at the BFI online website (British Film Institute). The series' first run was broadcast on Sunday afternoons at 5:30 or 5:25 pm in the UK for all four series by ATV London from 1955–1959, other regions varied day and year of transmission. CBS in the US broadcast the first three series on Monday nights at 7:30 pm from 26 September 1955 to 30 June 1958. The fourth-series episodes were screened in the US on Saturday mornings at 11:30 am between 10 January 1959 and 26 September 1959. Dates given on Network DVD release are incorrect for UK first run, as ATV London being the weekend London broadcast station did not transmit programmes on Monday evenings in 1955 and are in fact CBS US TX dates. Network dates for series 4 are for a UK TX on ABC Weekend Television (Midlands and the North) not first-run ATV London.) to 1 March 1959 on ITV. It starred Richard Greene as the outlaw Robin Hood and Alan Wheatley as his nemesis, the Sheriff of Nottingham. The show followed the legendary character Robin Hood and his band of merry men in Sherwood Forest and the surrounding vicinity. While some episodes dramatised the traditional Robin Hood tales, most were original dramas created by the show's writers and producers.

The programme was produced by Sapphire Films Ltd for ITC Entertainment, filmed at Nettlefold Studios with some location work, and was the first of many filmed shows commissioned by Lew Grade. In 1954, Grade was approached by American producer Hannah Weinstein to finance a series of 39 half-hour episodes, at a budget of £10,000 an episode, of a series she wished to make called The Adventures of Robin Hood. She had already signed Richard Greene to the project as Robin Hood and been given the backing of US distribution company, Official Films Inc, which were confident of selling it to the US market. Grade was so impressed by her proposal that he agreed immediately to back the series, hoping to make large profits by selling programmes to the lucrative American market. In the UK, the series premiered on ATV London, on Sunday 25 September 1955. ATV Midlands began the series on Friday 17 February 1956, with a staggered start across other regions from 1956 to 1961 as the ITV regional stations came on-air for the first time in the UK. The US premiere was on Monday 26 September 1955 by CBS. The series was shot on 35 mm film to provide the best possible picture quality and had fade-outs where US commercials were intended to slot in (the series was sponsored in the US by Johnson & Johnson (baby products, Band-Aid) and Wildroot Cream-Oil).

In Australia, the show aired on TCN9 in Sydney NSW and HSV7 Melbourne Victoria, actually being the first drama series broadcast by this station and CBC in Canada, and on CBS in the US. In France, RTF1 aired the show from 1965 to 1969 and RTF2 from 1969 to 1972. In Italy, Rai 1 aired the show from 1959 to 1964 and Rai 2 from 1965 to 1967. In Malaysia, RTM aired the show from late 1974 to early 1978. In the Philippines, ABS-CBN aired the show from 1963 to 1967, RBS (now GMA Network) from 1967 to 1972. In Indonesia, TVRI aired the show during the 1970s. In Romania, TVR aired the show from 1966 to 1980. In Poland aired the show in the late 1960s/early 1970s, in a popular programme for young people (each episode of the weekly programme Ekran z bratkiem ended with the broadcast of one episode of the series).

The programme continues to air in the United Kingdom on the Talking Pictures TV channel, shown regularly on Saturday mornings and Sunday afternoons.

== Characters ==
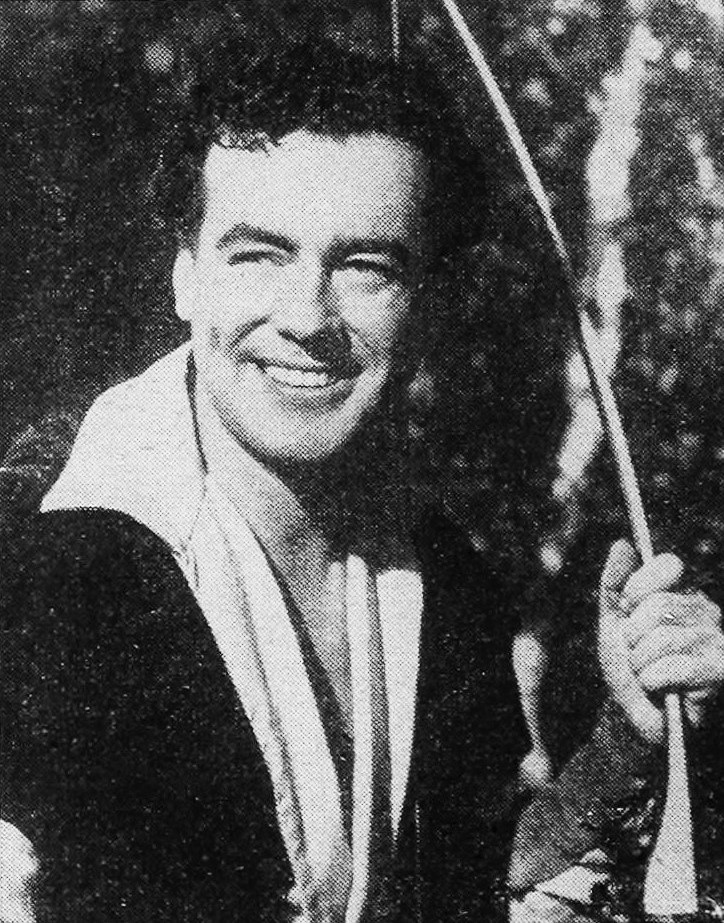
Richard Greene as Robin Hood

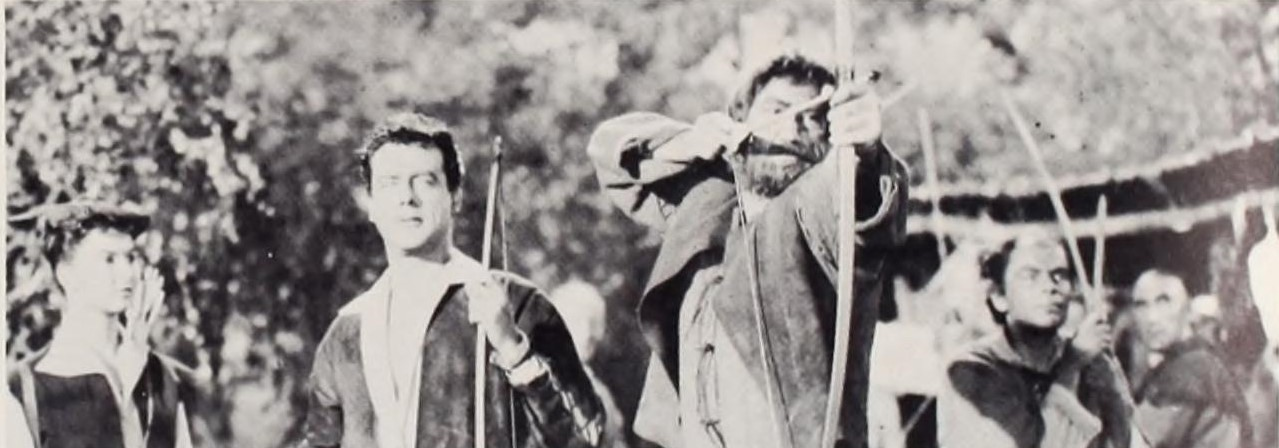
Maid Marian (Patricia Driscoll) with the Merry Men

=== Main characters ===
- Robin Hood (Robin of Locksley), a Saxon nobleman returned from the Crusades and forced into outlawry in Sherwood Forest. Played by Richard Greene.
- The Sheriff of Nottingham, a Norman baron and Robin Hood's enemy, who schemes to capture the outlaw. Played by Alan Wheatley.
- Little John, Robin Hood's trusted friend and his second in command. Played by Archie Duncan. Duncan was briefly replaced by Rufus Cruikshank for ten episodes after Duncan was injured when a horse bolted toward the spectators, mostly children, watching the location filming of the episode "Checkmate" on 20 April 1955. Archie Duncan grabbed the bridle, stopping the horse, but the cart it was pulling ran him over, causing a fractured kneecap and cuts and bruises. He received the Queen's Commendation for Bravery and £1,360 in damages from Sapphire Films.
- Maid Marian (Lady Marian Fitzwalter), a Norman Irish noblewoman and Robin Hood's lover. Played in series one and two by Bernadette O'Farrell and in series three and four by Patricia Driscoll.
- Friar Tuck, a member of Robin Hood's band. Played by Alexander Gauge.
- Will Scarlet, a member of Robin Hood's band. Played by Ronald Howard (two episodes, series 1) and Paul Eddington (series 4).
- Derwent, a member of Robin's band. Played by Victor Woolf. Woolf played several other guest roles in the series such as villagers, villains and other outlaws. Excepting Richard Greene, he appeared in the most episodes of the show, a total of 112.
- Joan, the barmaid at the Blue Boar Inn, a friend of Robin and his band's. Played by Simone Lovell.
- Sir Richard of the Lea, a friend of Robin and his band's. Played by Ian Hunter. Hunter had earlier played King Richard the Lionheart in the 1938 production The Adventures of Robin Hood starring Errol Flynn.
- Lady Leonia, wife of Sir Richard of the Lea. Played by Patricia Burke in five episodes.
- The Deputy Sheriff of Nottingham, (the Sheriff's replacement in series 4), played by John Arnatt.

=== Minor characters ===
- Alan-a-Dale, a member of Robin Hood's band. Played by John Schlesinger (two episodes, series 2), Richard Coleman (three episodes, series 4).
- Ethel, Derwent's wife played by Paula Byrne.

=== Historical characters ===
- Queen Eleanor, the mother of King Richard and Prince John. Played by Jill Esmond (two episodes, series 1).
- King Richard the Lionheart, the King of England, elder son of Queen Eleanor and older brother of Prince John. Played by Patrick Barr (two episodes, series 1).
- Prince John, the scheming friend of the Sheriff of Nottingham and younger brother of King Richard. Played by Donald Pleasence, Hubert Gregg, and Brian Haines.
- Princess Avice of Gloucester, the first wife of Prince John. Played by Helen Cherry and Doris Nolan (although Nolan was credited as "Prince John's Wife")
- Isabella of Angoulême, the second wife of Prince John. Played by Zena Walker.
- Prince Arthur played by Peter Asher (three episodes, series 1 & 2), Richard O'Sullivan (one episode, series 3) and Jonathan Bailey (one episode, series 4).
- Constance, Duchess of Brittany (Prince Arthur's mother), played by Dorothy Alison (three episodes, series 1 & 2), Pamela Alan (one episode, series 3), and Patricia Marmont (one episode, series 4).
- King William the Lion of Scotland played by Duncan McKintyre.

=== Other actors ===
Actors appearing in the series who later became better-known included: Lionel Jeffries, Leslie Phillips, Jane Asher, Anne Reid, Edward Mulhare, Patrick Troughton (who in 1953 had been the first actor to portray Robin Hood on TV in a live BBC series), Irene Handl, Nicholas Parsons, Sam Kydd, Desmond Llewelyn, Sid James, Joan Sims, Bernard Bresslaw, Leo McKern, Alfie Bass, Harry H. Corbett and Wilfrid Brambell, Billie Whitelaw, Paul Eddington, Ronald Allen and Gordon Jackson. John Schlesinger appeared as an actor in three episodes as singing minstrels (Hale and Alan a Dale (series 2)). A number of well-known actresses appeared as Saxon or Norman ladies, including Greta Gynt and Brenda de Banzie.

A number of actors appeared in supporting roles in most episodes: in series 1 these included: Victor Woolf, Willoughby Gray, and John Longden, and for later series included: Paul Hansard, Morris Barry, Nigel Davenport, Kevin Stoney, Ronald Hines, and Max Faulkner, who also did stunt/double work. Frank Maher (later Patrick McGoohan's stunt double) played many small non-speaking parts, and stuntman Terry Yorke, who doubled for Richard Greene, played many small roles throughout all four series. In Series 3, Paul Eddington played a different character in many episodes, before settling down to Will Scarlett.

== Plot and writing ==
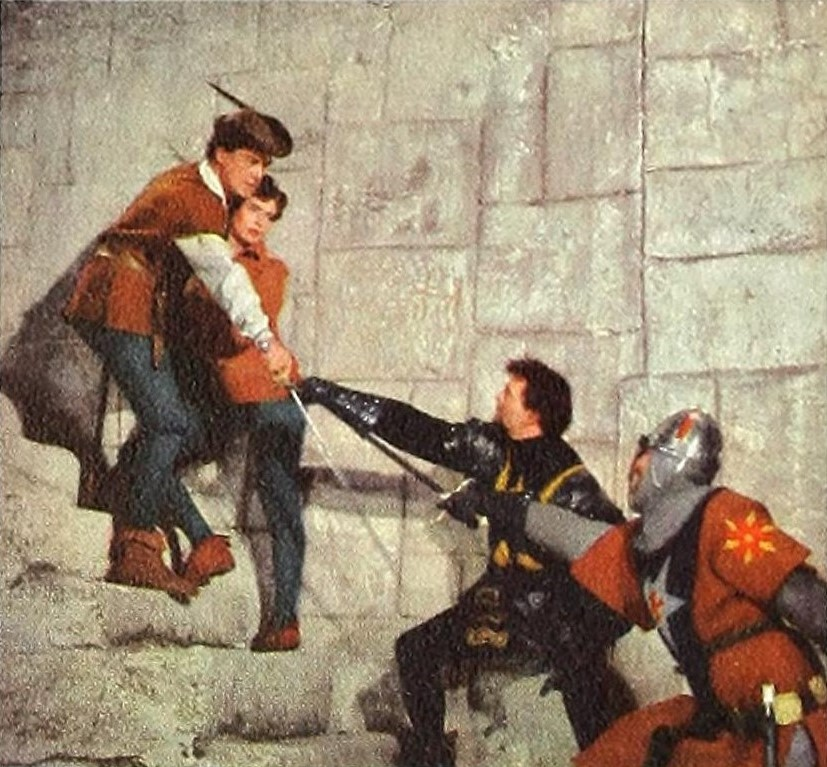
Robin Hood protects Maid Marian and fends off a villain played by John Dearth. The series was not filmed in colour.

The series is set in the 12th century, during the reign of King Richard the Lionheart.

Robin, Earl of Locksley, a Saxon nobleman, returns from the Crusades to find a Norman lord living in his ancestral home, Locksley Hall. He is forced to go to the Sheriff of Nottingham, who represents the law, seeking to reclaim his land. But the Sheriff, another Norman, sides with the usurper. Robin is tricked into signing a document fatal to his claim, but when the plot to then murder him goes wrong Robin ends up as a hunted man. In the forest he meets a peasant (Alfie Bass), who is due to have his hands mutilated for killing his lord's deer, but Robin rescues him. The hunter tells him of outlaws living free in the forest. When they meet the outlaws, Robin drops his title and asks to just be called Robin. As he is hooded, they call him Robin of the Hood.

He is thus forced into the life of an outlaw, dwelling in Sherwood Forest with a band of men who right the wrongs committed by the rich and powerful Normans against the poor and defenceless Saxons. He is given the name Robin Hood by the outlaw band's original leader, Will Scatlock, who is fatally wounded in the second episode. Robin Hood's enemy in the series is the Sheriff of Nottingham who, with his cohorts, adherents of the tyrant, Prince John, schemes to capture the outlaw by any means possible. Lady Marian Fitzwalter (Maid Marian), a young noblewoman and Robin Hood's lover, keeps him informed of the Sheriff's whereabouts and intentions. Episodes are punctuated with manly deeds of derring-do, tense escapes and pursuits, princely tournaments, the thundering hoof-beats of powerful steeds, the clattering of flashing swords, and the whizzing of fatally placed arrows.

In "A Year and A Day" (series 2), a refugee peasant explains that, under English law, a peasant who escapes serfdom and lives in a city for "a year and a day" is a free man, provided the man lives openly, not in hiding. When Robin Hood helps the peasant move about the city, the Sheriff invokes "the law of hue-and-cry", explaining that any man within hearing must drop his chores and help apprehend the felon. In "A Christmas Goose" (series 3), a boy's goose nips a lord's horse so the lord is thrown. The lord condemns the goose to death—for his Christmas dinner. But Robin Hood counters that under English common law, an accused animal is entitled to a fair trial, the same as a human. While Robin Hood drags out the trial, Friar Tuck gets the cook drunk and switches geese. When the deception is revealed, the lord relents and pardons the goose. Two episodes, "Brother Battle" (#84) and "To Be a Student" (#90) emphasised the Catholic Church's struggle to educate commoners, and even the children of the Saxon serfs, despite laws forbidding the practice and in the face of opposition from the Norman nobility.

The supporting characters are occasionally resourceful. In "The Goldmaker's Return" (series 2), Robin Hood is away in France on a mission. Lady Marian, Little John and the other Merry Men carry the day without the star of the show ever showing his face. Most of the time, however, Robin is required to save the day single-handed, following the usual comment that "sending many men would be noticed, only one man going in alone will be overlooked", etc. Despite the simplistic plotting required by the 26-minute format, the writing was both professional in its handling of situations, and pointed in its dialogue.

Anachronisms abounded: the lipsticked girl with modern hairdo in the "Friar Tuck" episode, for instance; wine cups for each occupant at a table in "Checkmate", when that only became the practice hundreds of years later; the 20th century school implements in "Brother Battle"; the use of Guineas from the 1700s as coinage; written tavern signs when most people were illiterate; and a "bard" in "The Challenge" episode who sings a song to the late 17th-century tune of "Lillibullero" in 12th-century England. All this is typical of every series of historical fiction, but the show's producers pointed with pride to their accuracy, courtesy of hired consultants.

There was an element of self-parody at times. For instance, in one episode, "The Challenge", the plot finished halfway through the show, and the remainder became a comedy as the hapless Richard of the Lea and his wife worried whilst their larder and wine cellar were emptied, during a siege, by Robin, Little John, and Tuck eating and dancing all the day and night.

== Episodes ==
Series	No. of episodes	Originally aired:	
Series	No. of episodes	Premiered	Ended
1	39	25 September 1955	23 June 1956
2	37	10 August 1956	9 June 1957
3	41	6 September 1957	22 June 1958
4	26	14 September 1958	1 March 1959

A total of 143 episodes were filmed in four series.

== Production details ==
=== Blacklisted writers ===
The Adventures of Robin Hood was produced by Hannah Weinstein, who had left-wing political views. The series was explicitly created by Weinstein to enable the commissioning of scripts by blacklisted American writers. Among these were Ring Lardner Jr., Waldo Salt, Robert Lees, and Adrian Scott. Howard Koch, who was also blacklisted, served for a while as the series' script editor. The blacklisted writers were credited under pseudonyms, to avoid the attention of studio executives.

The sponsored prints of the first five episodes of series one, screened by CBS in the US on its first run, had no writer credits on their end title sequences; writers were only credited on sponsored prints from episode 6 onward, only later non-sponsored US re-run prints of series one have writer credits for these episodes, some of which differ from writer credits on UK prints. As an example, Lawrence McClellan is credited as writer of "The Coming of Robin Hood" on US prints, for the UK the pseudonym used is Eric Heath.

After the blacklist collapsed, Lardner said that the series' format allowed him "plenty of opportunities to comment on issues and institutions in Eisenhower-era America"; presumably "A Tuck in Time" was such an episode, in which a twin of Friar Tuck arrives boasting of his willingness to sell a weapon that could destroy the world. In addition to the redistributive themes of a hero who robs from the rich and gives to the poor, many episodes in the programme's first two seasons included the threat that Robin and his band would be betrayed to the authorities by friends or loved ones, much as the blacklisted writers had been. For example, the third season story "The Angry Village" had paranoid villagers turn on each other when they think a traitor is in their midst. But the half-hour length episodes and broad-target market precluded any political criticism that went beyond the generalities of 19th century Robin Hood revival books.

=== Filming ===
Whilst interiors were filmed at Nettlefold Studios, location shooting for the series took place on the nearby Wisley Common, Wisley, Surrey, and at the adjoining Foxwarren Park estate, near Cobham, owned by Hannah Weinstein. Horses used for filming were also stabled at Foxwarren House, which had a projection room for viewing daily film rushes and completed films. In 1956, a replica castle exterior, complete with drawbridge, was built in the grounds of the estate for filming of The Adventures of Sir Lancelot series. (It features prominently in title sequence for the colour episodes.) This was used predominantly for castle scenes in series 3 & 4 of Robin Hood; it first appears as Chateau Marmont in "The Bandit of Brittany" during series 2, in place of the standing castle and village set on the backlot at Nettlefold studios used in series 1 & most of series 2.

As well as this, establishing shots and short film sequences were also shot at various medieval buildings in the UK including: Allington Castle in Kent, this was used to establish Fitzwalter Castle, Marian's home in the series, Painshill Park, near Cobham, Saltwood Castle in Hythe, and Pencoed Castle near Magor in Monmouthshire. Three Northumberland sites were used: Alnwick Castle, Lindisfarne Castle, and Warkworth Castle. Some of the other sites used through the series were Bodiam Castle in East Sussex, Leith Hill near Dorking, Framlingham Castle in Suffolk, Newark Priory near Ripley, Castle Mill in Dorking, and Newark Mill.

=== Crew ===
- Directors of Photography – Gerald Gibbs (series 1), Ken Hodges (series 1–4), Ernest Palmer (series 2), Michael Reed (series 2–3), Ian Craig (series 4)
- Camera Operators – Noel Rowland (series 1–4), Eric Williams (series 4)
- Art Directors – Peter Proud (series 1), John Blezard (series 2–4), Peter Mullins (series 2–3)
- Production Designer – Peter Proud (series 2)
- Art Supervisor – William Kellner (series 2)
- Assistant Director – Christopher Noble
- Sound – H.P. Pearson
- Film Editors – Bill Lewthwaite, Peter Seabourne, Harry Booth, Inman Hunter, and Thelma Connell (series 1), Joan Warwick (series 2–4), David Hawkins (series 2), Lee Doig (series 3–4), Peter Rolfe Johnson (series 4), Richard Sidwell (series 4)
- Dubbing Editors – Harry Booth and Michael Deeley (series 1), Freddie Cook (series 2)
- Supervising Film Editors – Thelma Connell (series 1–2), Maurice Rootes (series 2)
- Continuity – Joanna Busby/Barbara Thomas (series 1) Olga Marshall (series 2)
- Make-Up Supervisor – Walter Schneiderman
- Hairdressers – Eileen Bates (series 1–2), Bill Griffiths (series 1), Betty Sheriff (series 2)
- Wardrobe Supervisor – Brenda Gardner
- Script Editors – Albert G. Ruben (series 1–3), Kathryn Dawes (series 2), Peggy Phillips (series 2–3), Raymond Bowers (series 4)
- Production Supervisor/Manager – George Mills (series 1), Harold Buck (series 1–4)
- Assistant Producer – John C. George
- Production Associate – Richard Greene (series 4)
- Associate Producer – Thelma Connell (series 2–4)
- Producer – Sidney Cole (series 1–4, credited as Associate Producer on series 1)
- Executive Producer – Hannah Weinstein

=== Music ===
Each episode in the first two series started with a country scene of faux everyday life in Olde England, during which an introductory poem in rhymed cadence was intoned in voice-over, to the tune of the English folksong "Early One Morning", which derives from a much later period than that in which the series is set. Each poem was a humorous summary vignette of what could be expected in the episode. In the first-run CBS-sponsored screenings in the US, an actor portraying the Minstrel would use the same melody before the final fade to black before the end credits, letting viewers know that the sponsor "now begs a word with you".

"Sumer Is Icumen In", an English ballad actually sung in the 12th century, is featured throughout the series. At times it is heard as background music at parties. In "The Betrothal", Sir Richard's son plays it on his flute while his betrothed sings it. In the episode "Carlotta", Little John sings it to his sweetheart. In "The Path of True Love", Marian sings it to stall Sir Charles. In one of its most prominent uses, Robin forces a group of soldiers to sing it. It's worth noting that this melody was whistled by Little John before his first meeting with Robin in the Hollywood feature film The Adventures of Robin Hood (1938).

The Merry Men perform the soul cake song in "The Thorkil Ghost", with Derwent singing a solo.

"All Around My Hat", a song of nineteenth-century English origin, features very prominently in the plot of the episode "The Prisoner". It is claimed to be a favourite song of the crusading King Richard and is continually sung by the king's courier who has been secretly imprisoned in Prince John's dungeon. The tune is so charismatic that a dungeon jailer sings it while drinking at a tavern and is overheard by Robin Hood, thus alerting Robin to the courier's fate.

The episode "The Haunted Mill" features a song supposedly sung by the Baker's guild.

The episode "The Minstrel" featured two songs, one wishing for the speedy return of King Richard, and one lampooning the sheriff of Nottingham.

==== Closing theme song ====
Carl Sigman wrote the words and music for the theme song, which was sung by Dick James. The song is still fondly remembered:

Robin Hood, Robin Hood, Riding through the glen
Robin Hood, Robin Hood, With his band of men
Feared by the bad, Loved by the good
Robin Hood, Robin Hood, Robin Hood

He called the greatest archers to a tavern on the green
They vowed to help the people of the king
They handled all the trouble on the English country scene
And still found plenty of time to sing

[Chorus (1st paragraph) repeat]

In 1956, the theme song was released on Parlophone records by Dick James with Stephen James and his chums and Ron Goodwin's Orchestra and reached number 14 in the UK charts (78 rpm single:R.4117/45rpm single:MSP6199), and by Pye Records as a 78 rpm single by Gary Miller with Tony Osbourne orchestra and the Beryl Stott chorus (PYE N.15020) and reached number 10 on the UK charts. Versions by Frankie Laine (CBS Coronet), Nelson Riddle and his Orchestra (Capitol), Alan Dale (Coral), Joe Reisman's orchestra and chorus (RCA Victor), and Ronnie Ronalde (Colombia) were also issued. These versions had extended lyrics, with five verses and the chorus repeated six times. The sound effect at the start of the theme tune, of an arrow being fired into a tree, was produced by record producer Joe Meek, who was also the recording engineer on the Gary Miller version.

This song was parodied many years later on the 1970s TV series Monty Python's Flying Circus, in their Dennis Moore sketch, which depicted a masked highwayman from the 18th century (intended to mimic in appearance the real life highwayman Dick Turpin) stealing lupins (parodied as "... He steals from the poor, Gives to the rich, Stupid bitch!"). It's also played at every Nottingham Forest home match. The song, the titles, and the whole show were also parodied in the Hancock's Half Hour television episode "Ericson the Viking" in 1958, where Sid James talks Hancock into appearing in an on-the-cheap historical drama, "Ericson, Ericson, Ericson the Good: Ericson, Ericson, nipping through the wood...ole!"

"Robin des Bois" was the theme recorded for the French TV market. Sung in French, it can be heard on the 3rd series episode "Farewell to Tuck" released by Network on DVD. The series was first broadcast in France as "Aventures dans la Foret de Sherwood" in 1965 on ORTF. Other countries to broadcast the series included Canada in 1955–1958 on CBOT, Toronto, and CKCO, Kitchener, Ontario; Australia in 1956–1961 on HSV7 (The Seven Network); Finland in 1964 on NORDEEZE; the Netherlands in 1965/66 on AVRO; and Germany between 1971 and 1974 on ARD.

First series episodes also exist with a variant downbeat instrumental end theme by Edwin Astley, which can be heard on the episode "The Highlander" released by Network DVD.

=== Artistic details ===
Art director Peter Proud, an expert at wartime camouflage, hit on the idea of putting many props on wheels to facilitate quick set changes, since one 26-minute episode was shot every four and a half days. The show boasted "140 set pieces (baronial fireplaces, staircases, stone walls, entrance halls, and the like)". There was some outdoor location filming, mainly involving horse-riding doubles and stuntmen, and without dialogue recording. Sets were designed from parchments and sketches from the British Museum, and modelled on the castles of Harlech, Farleigh, and Framlingham. Some of the 100 soldiers who manned the battlements of Nottingham Castle were miniature toy soldiers.

=== Sponsorship ===
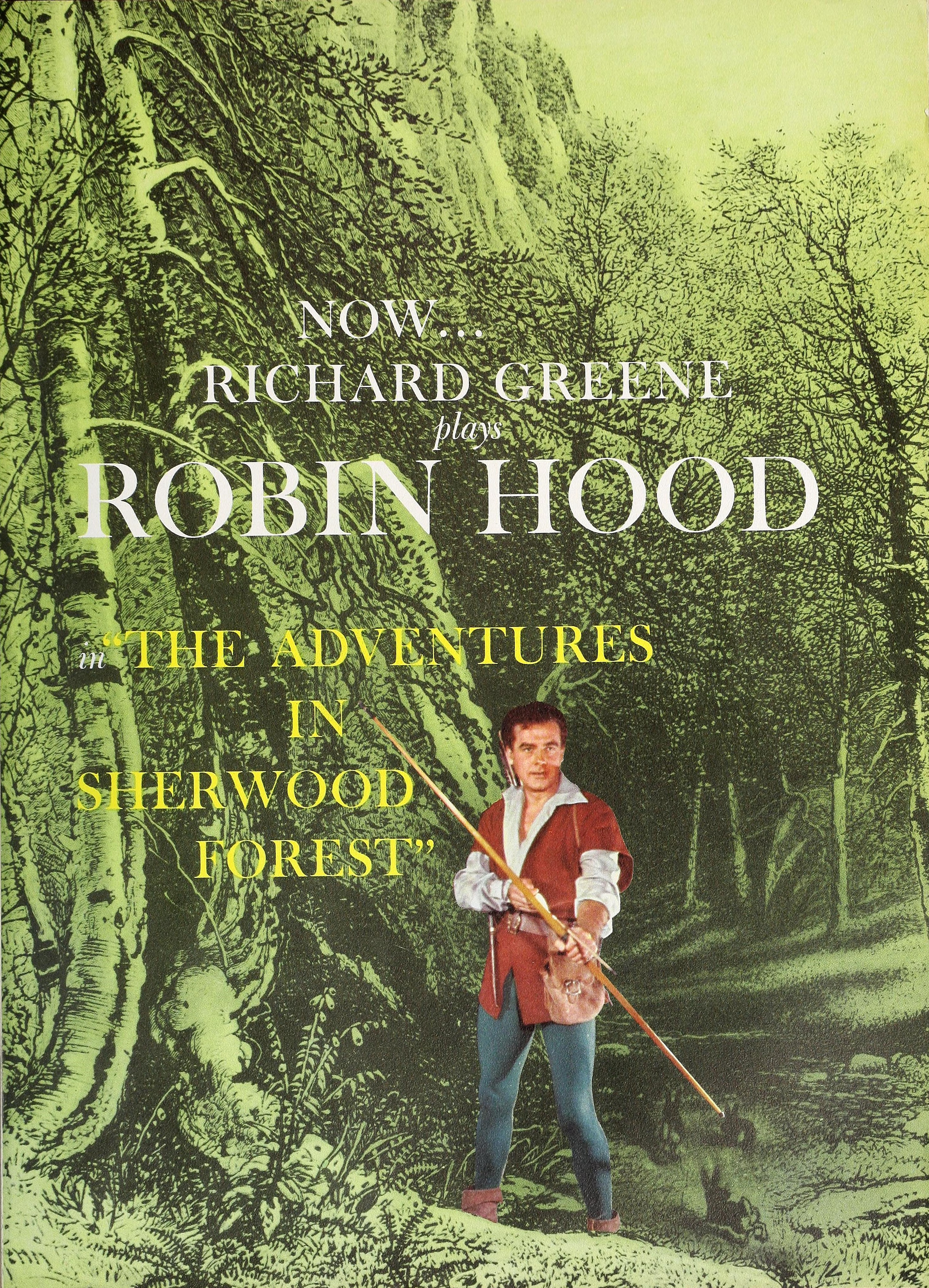
1958 advertisement featuring the series' alternative title, The Adventures in Sherwood Forest.

In the US, the original CBS syndication prints had a few differences from the original UK prints. After the brief title sequence, the US prints would repeat this sequence but with "Brought to You By" and, after the arrow strikes the tree, the sponsor's name "Wildroot Cream-Oil" superimposed. "Johnson & Johnson" sponsored episodes had a voice-over over the opening titles "Richard Greene in The Adventures of Robin Hood" and over the repeated sequence "presented by" followed by the names of two Johnson & Johnson products, images of which would appear over the shot of the arrow in the tree. A commercial featuring one of the products would then be shown, the Wildroot Cream-Oil sponsored episodes would then feature an animated commercial showing a Robin Hood–type figure with lank hair and a dinosaur. A minstrel song would then be sung at the beginning of each episode, over the episode title, providing a playful poetic synopsis in short prose of what could be expected to be seen. After the final fade to black, a sequence featuring an actor playing the Minstrel would be shown as he sang these lyrics to the tune of "Early One Morning": "We'll have the merry time again with Robin and his Merry Men and the folk who'll bring him to you then now beg a word with you", followed by a commercial for the next week's sponsor before the end titles would be shown (Wildroot Cream Oil and Johnson & Johnson sponsored alternate episodes), the end credits start with the opening sequence, with Sandy Becker mentioning the sponsor's name again, and the sponsor's product appearing on screen through the end titles which are shown over the shot of the tree. This caption also appeared: "This film was flown to the USA via Pan American World Airways". The opening minstrel tunes were also sung to the tune of "Early One Morning." There were two sponsors of the CBS syndicated screenings, Wildroot Cream-Oil (a hair tonic company), and Johnson & Johnson (known in the UK and US for its baby powder). The commercials involved "within" the episodes appeared originally on all three Seasons broadcast at 7.30pm (eastern standard time) /6.30pm (central standard time) Monday nights on CBS (not series 4).

Alternative title captions appear over the opening sequence on some US prints. Instead of "Richard Greene in The Adventures of Robin Hood" they state "Richard Greene plays Robin Hood – Adventures in Sherwood Forest". This practice occurred because of an FCC rule demanding that reruns of a series be retitled for syndication packaging if aired while first-run episodes of the series were still being shown on one of the three major networks.

Alternative US end credit titles crediting the series as "A Hannah Weinstein Production for Sapphire Films Limited" (and for later episodes from 1958 "A Hannah Fisher Production") also exist.

In the UK, at the time, sponsorship of programmes was not allowed and each episode had one commercial break in the middle.

== Influence ==
The series was an immediate hit on both sides of the Atlantic, drawing 32,000,000 viewers per week. Sapphire films were commissioned to make four other series by Lew Grade: The Adventures of Sir Lancelot (1956/57, broadcast by NBC on Monday nights at 8.00 pm), The Buccaneers (1956/57, broadcast by CBS on Saturday nights at 7.30 pm), Sword of Freedom (1957/58), and The Four Just Men (1958/59). The success of these inspired other historic drama series from ITC like The Adventures of William Tell, Sir Francis Drake, The Adventures of the Scarlet Pimpernel, The Count of Monte Cristo. ITC continued to make and sell TV series to the US until the late 1970s, including The Saint and The Muppet Show.

== Merchandise ==
=== Products ===
Many licensed products and knockoffs were sold, including books, jigsaw puzzles, iron-on patches, toy bows and arrows, a series of bubble gum cards, and more. The Marx Toy Company released a metal lithographed Adventures of Robin Hood castle playset with 60 mm plastic knights, Merrie Men and five character figures in the likenesses of Robin, Marion, Little John, Friar Tuck and the Sheriff. The "Robin Hood" shoe brand sporting Richard Greene's likeness on the interior heel lasted long after the series stopped production. Magazine Enterprises featured Richard Greene photos on three Robin Hood comic books. Robin and Marian made the cover of TV Guide in the Week of 12–18 May 1956.

=== DVD ===
In Region 1, Mill Creek Entertainment has released all 4 seasons on DVD. They have also released a complete series set featuring all 143 episodes of the series. Alpha Video has released 22 single volume collections of the series, featuring various episodes.

In Region 2, Network DVD has released all 4 seasons on DVD in the UK. Three DVD boxsets of the series have also been released in Germany by KNM Home Entertainment as "Die Abenteuer Von Robin Hood" with German-language soundtracks in 2009.

DVD name	EP#	Release dates	
DVD name	EP#	Region 1	Region 2
The Complete First Season	39	18 March 2008	3 March 2008
The Complete Second Season	39	14 October 2008	1 December 2008
The Complete Third Season	39	31 March 2009	1 November 2008
The Complete Fourth Season	26	25 August 2009	24 January 2005
The Complete Series	143	25 August 2009; 14 May 2019 (re-release)	12 December 2011

== Compilation episodes ==
In the early 1990s, in the wake of the Kevin Costner film Robin Hood: Prince of Thieves, three movie-length compilation features (approx. 90 min. each) were created from the series by producers Philip May & Joseph Shields, through editing and computer-colourising parts of the various episodes, though not necessarily in chronological order. These were as follows:

- Robin Hood: The Movie (1991), featuring edited material from episodes: 1, 2, 3, 5, 8 and 27. Notably, Will Scatlock who dies at the end of episode 2 in the series (thereby transferring the outlaw leadership to Robin Hood), is not killed until the end of the 90 min feature.
- Robin Hood's Greatest Adventures (1991)
- Robin Hood: Quest for the Crown (1991)

== Film ==
Sidney Cole and Richard Greene produced the feature film Sword of Sherwood Forest (1960), for Hammer Film Productions (in association with Yeoman Films), directed by Terence Fisher, written by Alan Hackney, director of photography was Ken Hodges, and the film editor was Lee Doig, all TV series alumni. Richard Greene starred as Robin Hood with Peter Cushing as the Sheriff of Nottingham; blonde-haired Sarah Branch played Maid Marian with Nigel Green as Little John, Jack Gwillim as Archbishop Hubert Walter, and Richard Pasco as Edward, Earl of Newark. Oliver Reed also had a small role. It was filmed in colour and in a widescreen process referred to as "Megascope" on the opening titles. The film itself was a retelling of how Robin first met Marion.

== See also ==
- List of films and television series featuring Robin Hood
