= Stanley Anderson (artist) =

British engraver, etcher and watercolour painter

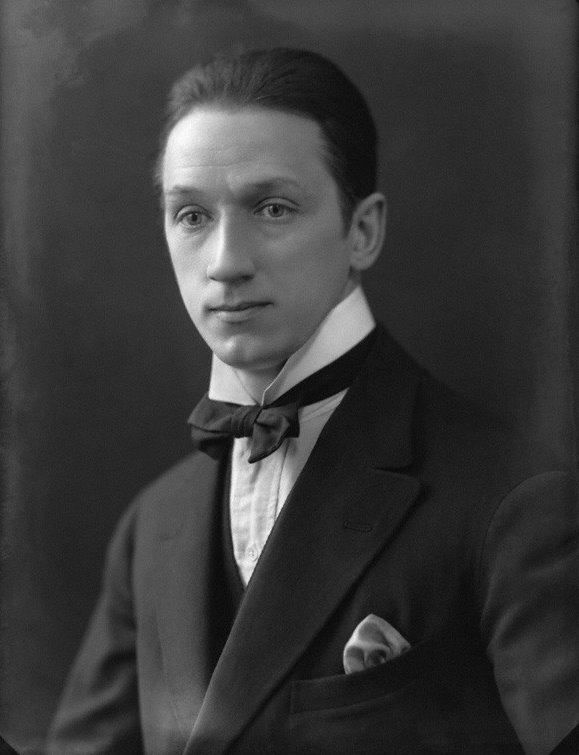
Stanley Anderson in 1921

Alfred Charles Stanley Anderson CBE RA (11 May 1884 – 4 March 1966) was a British engraver, etcher and watercolour painter. Anderson was principally known for the series of highly detailed engravings of traditional British crafts that he completed over a twenty-year period beginning in 1933.

== Early life and education ==
Anderson was born in Bristol on 11 May 1884, the son of Alfred Ernest Anderson, a silver engraver. He was educated at Merchant Venturers' Technical College, Bristol, and took evening classes at Bristol School of Art. Against Stanley's wishes, his father arranged for him to begin a heraldic engraving apprenticeship during which he learned to etch on metal.

== Marriage ==
Anderson married Lillian Phelps in 1910. They had children, Ivan (1911) and Maxim (1914–1959). Maxim became a documentary director and producer.

== Career ==
Anderson's artistic career began in earnest in 1909. He won an engraving scholarship of £50 per year from the British Institution and studied at the Royal College of Art under Frank Short, and at Goldsmiths College, New Cross. Anderson claimed, however, to be mainly self-taught from visits to the National Gallery and the British Museum. He joined the Royal Society of Painter-Etchers and Engravers as an associate in 1910, becoming a fellow in 1923. He was one of a number of young artists associated with the Painter-Etchers during the war years and immediately afterwards that were credited with reinvigorating that institution.

During the First World War Anderson did munitions work in Woolwich. He did not see active service due to a heart condition.

In 1925, he became the engraving tutor at Goldsmiths' where he taught Graham Sutherland. From 1930 to 1952 he was a member of the Engraving Faculty at the British School at Rome. He became an associate of the Royal Academy in 1934 and a full member in 1941. His diploma work for the Royal Academy was The Wheelright (1939). He participated in the Venice Biennale as a main artist in 1928 and as part of group shows in 1924, 1926, 1928, 1930 and 1938. He exhibited at the annual exhibitions of the Chicago Society of Etchers and the California Society of Etchers.

== Social comment ==
What a piece of work is Man, Stanley Anderson. Engraving, 1936.

In the early inter-war years Anderson's work was mainly composed of portraits, landscapes and street scenes. From the 1920s he began to add social comment and ironic commentary, which increased in the 1930s as his work became more mature and began to reflect his growing disillusionment with modern life. This can be seen in Wreckage (1922), By-Products (1922), in the tramp-like figures lounging in The National Gallery (1925), and in the flute playing busker in Pan in Fulham (1932).

In What a piece of work is Man (1936), Anderson deployed ironic humour in commenting on Hamlet's musing about the nature of man. The scene depicts two men having a discussion in a library reading room, where newspapers may be consulted for nothing by those that cannot afford to buy their own copy. The woman behind them has a hole in the heel of her stocking.

The stands on which the newspapers are displayed have the labels Weekly Blurb, Fleet St. Slush and Frycassee. One has the headline "Art Today by Blurbert Wede" in mocking reference to Sir Herbert Read, the influential critic of the day and his book Art Now (1933). On the facing page is an image of a child's stick drawing, referring to Read's interest in the art of children, and a crude Picassoesque portrait. Both reflect Anderson's disdain for modern tendencies in art and ask whether such things can even be art. The newspaper on the right has an article titled "Hollywood Divorce" on one page and a picture feature titled "CIVILIZATION!" on the other. This page includes images of weapons of war, people in gas-masks, a bishop blessing soldiers, a worker and a top-hatted boss on their knees praying before machinery in the shape of a £ sign, and a march of the unemployed.

In The Wayfarer (1941) three men sit at a pub table drinking beer. One is evidently a gentleman of the road. On the wall behind them a small poster advertises the performance of "Cinema Dope for Machine Slaves".

== Country crafts series ==
In 1933, Anderson bought a cottage ("Old Timbers") in Towersey, near Thame, Oxfordshire, and began producing the engravings of country crafts for which he is best known. Each was based on detailed preliminary sketches and sold in a limited edition of around 40 or 60, at the Royal Academy or other exhibitions. In many cases, background biographical information is known about the craftsmen featured and their tools and techniques. Anderson often knew them personally and saw them as his equals. His depictions are of real people carrying out their day-to-day work with the actual tools they used.

The Lacemaker, for instance, was based on studies of Dorcas Ing (aged 87 at the time) of Long Crendon near Thame made in 1939. Ing had died by the time the engraving was published the following year. She was the only woman featured in the series, though not the only woman in Anderson's work generally. By 1939, the hand making of lace, once common in the village, was very much in decline.

The Thatcher (1944) shows Arthur Ing of Long Crendon, son of Dorcas Ing, using his bat on the hip of a cottage as he repairs or renews a thatched roof.

Making the Gate (1948) depicts Rupert Timms who was born 1912 in Aston Clinton near Thame. He came from a long line of farriers and worked with his father Ralph until Ralph's death in 1960. Work for the Timms began to decline after World War Two so in 1947 they entered a competition for blacksmiths run by the Royal Agricultural Society of England who aimed to revive rural crafts. The task was to create a wrought iron gate. The Timms built the gate to a design by Anderson and won first prize in the competition which was held at the 1947 Royal Show at Oxford. They won again at York in 1948. The engraving shows Rupert Timms making the gate with Anderson's design pinned up on the wall behind him. The Timms developed a business as ornamental blacksmiths based on Anderson's original design and they made gates St. Mary's Church, Thame, and Elm Park Recreation Ground, also in Thame.

The Lacemaker, 1939.

The Thatcher, 1944.

Making The Gate, 1948.

Anderson was a traditionalist in his working methods, in his taste (he disliked modern art) and in his concern for the threat to rural crafts, and critics have identified in this series a high level of consistency between the laborious craftsmanship of the men Anderson depicted and the painstaking methods that he used in his engravings, making both subject and method examples of traditional English craft. It was for this body of work that Anderson was awarded his CBE in 1951.

- The Hedger, 1934.
- Sheep Dipping, 1935.
- Purbeck Quarry Men, 1936.
- The Hurdle Makers, 1937.
- The Wheelwright, 1939.
- The Lacemaker, 1940.
- Sheep Shearing, 1942.
- The Basket Maker, 1942.
- Clamping Spuds, 1942.
- Trimming and Faggoting, 1943.
- The Chair Maker, 1944.
- The Thatcher, 1944.
- Hedge-laying, 1945.
- Tree Fellers, 1945.
- The Saddler, 1946.
- The Smith, 1946.
- The Cooper, 1947.
- Trimming Stakes, 1947.
- Making the Gate, 1948.
- The Rake Makers, 1948.
- The Violin Maker, 1948.
- The Clothes Peg Maker, 1953.

The country crafts series was unnumbered and a large number of other works were completed on similar countryside subjects, depicting characters such as The Farm Hand (1933) or The Country Pedlar (1943), other countryside activities, horses and other subjects.

== Watercolours ==
After developing neuritis in his right hand and arm, line engraving on copper became increasingly painful for Anderson. He engraved his last plate in 1953 and thereafter concentrated on watercolour paintings of country scenes which were sold at the annual exhibition of the Royal Academy of Arts. Humphrey Brooke, secretary to the Royal Academy until 1968, recalled in The Times that there was a "stampede" each year to buy Anderson's paintings which often sold out within minutes of the opening, one collector being seen in running shoes to beat the competition.

== Death ==
Anderson died at his home at Darobey, Church Lane, Chearsley, Buckinghamshire, on 4 March 1966.

== Exhibitions ==
The exhibition, An Abiding Standard: The Prints of Stanley Anderson RA, curated by Professor Robert Meyrick and Dr Harry Heuser ran at the Royal Academy of Arts, London, 25 February – 24 May 2015.

== Papers ==
Material relating to Stanley Anderson may be found in the James Laver and Harold Wright collections at the University of Glasgow. James Laver (1899–1975) was a writer and art critic and a keeper at the Victoria and Albert Museum. Harold Wright (1885–1961) was a print dealer with Colnaghi & Co.

== See also ==
- Muirhead Bone
- Gerald Brockhurst
- Malcolm Osborne
- Henry Rushbury
- William Strang
