= Offton =

Village in Suffolk, England

Coordinates: 52.106254°N 1.014634°E

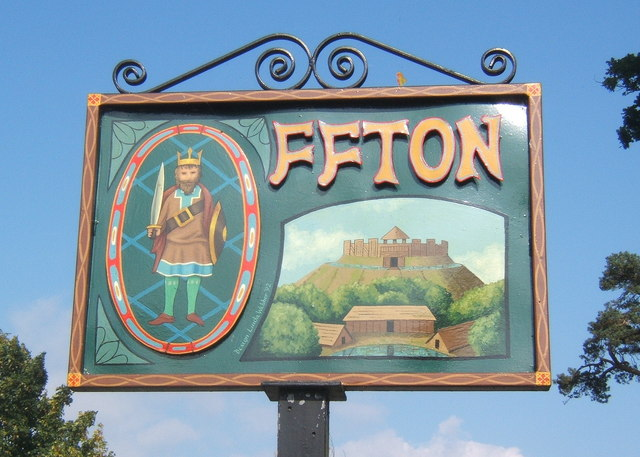
- Offton village sign

- Location within Suffolk
- Population: 358 (2011)
- OS grid reference: TM0649
- District: Mid Suffolk
- Shire county: Suffolk
- Region: East
- Country: England
- Sovereign state: United Kingdom
- Post town: Ipswich
- Postcode district: IP8
- Police: Suffolk
- Fire: Suffolk
- Ambulance: East of England

Offton is a village in Suffolk, England. The name is derived from the Old English "Offas farm/settlement", suggesting a potential Anglo-Saxon origin for the settlement, if not earlier.

== History ==
The Domesday survey records four landholders in the village in 1086, including estates in the possession of William I and Roger Bigod. Between the four, there were 25 households and three churches recorded, although the number of livestock counted seemingly falls dramatically from 1 cob, 2 cattle, 12 pigs, and 40 sheep in 1066 to nothing in 1086.

At some stage in the eleventh and twelfth centuries, Offton castle was constructed within the village. This may have adapted an earlier moated or enclosed site, and by the Anarchy of the twelfth century was in the possession of William de Ambli.

Novelist H. W. Freeman was a resident for many years.
