= Milton Schlesinger =

American virologist (1927–2017)

Milton Schlesinger (born 1927, d. October 27, 2017) was a professor of molecular microbiology at the Washington University School of Medicine, known for his role in the study of heat shock proteins.

== Academic career ==
Schlesinger attended Yale College as an undergraduate and received his bachelor's degree in physics in 1951. He then earned his master's degree in biophysics in 1953 from the University of Rochester and his Ph.D. in biochemistry in 1959 from the University of Michigan. He spent two years as a postdoctoral fellow at the Istituto Superiore di Sanità in Rome, Italy, and three years as a research associate at the Massachusetts Institute of Technology before joining the faculty at Washington University in St. Louis in 1967. He would remain there for the rest of his scientific career, reaching the rank of full professor in 1972 and serving two stints as the acting chair of the microbiology department. He took visiting positions and sabbaticals at the Imperial Cancer Research Fund Laboratories and at Harvard University. Schlesinger retired and assumed professor emeritus status in 1999.

Schlesinger's virology research focused on viral replication and assembly. Among his best-known work is his study of heat shock proteins, which he was the first to identify in vertebrate cells and on which he co-edited a book, Stress Proteins, in 1990. Along with Sondra Schlesinger, he co-edited a major reference work on togaviruses and flaviviruses. He became a fellow of the American Association for the Advancement of Science in 1999.

== Personal life ==
Schlesinger was married to fellow WashU professor and virology researcher Sondra Schlesinger for 62 years. He died on October 27, 2017.
