= Victor Woolf =

English actor (1911–1975)

- Victor Woolf in The Harvest Shall Come, 1942
- Born: Victor John Woolf; 1911; England
- Died: 1975 (aged 63-64); London, United Kingdom
- Occupation: Actor
- Years active: 1942–1974
- Spouse(s): Ann Grace Robinson (m. 1945 – ?, Div.) 1 daughter, Gillian

Victor John Woolf (1911–1975) was an English actor, both on stage and on screen. Stage credits include the stage manager in the 1969 West End production of Mame.

Victor Woolf as Derwent the Joiner in The Adventures of Robin Hood.

== Select appearances ==
=== Film ===
- The Harvest Shall Come (1942)
- The Two-Headed Spy (1958)
- Frankenstein and the Monster from Hell (1974)

=== Television ===
- Androcles and the Lion (TV movie; 1946)
- Toad of Toad Hall (TV movie, 1946)
- The Adventures of Robin Hood: 112 episodes (1955–60)
- The New Adventures of Charlie Chan: "The Invalid" (1958)
- Fredric March Presents Tales from Dickens: "Bardell Versus Pickwick" and "Sam Weller and his Father" (1959)
- International Detective: "The Dimitrios Case" (1960)
- The Prisoner: "Hammer into Anvil" (1967)
- Public Eye: "But They Always Come Back for Tea" (1968)
- Z-Cars: "Who Was That Lady?: Part 2" (1968)
- The Mind of Mr. J.G. Reeder: "The Treasure Hunt" (1969)
- Out of the Unknown: "Get Off My Cloud" (1969)
- Ooh La La!: "Keep an Eye on Amélie" (1973)

=== Stage ===
- The Importance of Being Earnest (ENSA Garrison Theatre, Cairo, Egypt, Winter of 1945)
