= 1956 in British radio =

This is a list of events from British radio in 1956.

== Events ==
- January to March
  - No events.
- April
  - 22 April – The Shipping Forecast is broadcast on long wave for the first time. It had previously aired on medium wave.
- May
  - Charles Hill, the former 'Radio Doctor' now Postmaster General with government responsibility for broadcasting, attempts to formalise the existing 'fourteen-day rule' agreement by which discussions or statements about matters before Parliament cannot be broadcast in the fortnight preceding any debate.
- June
  - c. June – The first British-made all-transistor radio is produced, by Pye, marketed as the Pam Model 710.
- July
  - No events.
- August
  - 17 August – Bacchanale by Jacques Ibert, a commission by the BBC to mark the tenth anniversary of the Third Programme, is performed at The Proms with the composer in the audience.
- September
  - No events.
- October
  - 29 October–7 November – Suez Crisis. The British government pressures the BBC to support the war and seriously considers taking over the network. Charles Hill also criticises the BBC's coverage but accepts that the 'fourteen-day rule' is unworkable and it is completely suspended by the year's end.
- November
  - No events.
- December
  - 12 December – The Irish Republican Army launches its Border Campaign in Northern Ireland with the bombing of a BBC relay transmitter in County Londonderry.
  - 22 December – The BBC Light Programme begins transmitting from the Wenvoe transmitting station in south Wales on VHF, giving it a wider audience.

== Programme debuts ==
- 24 April – The Clitheroe Kid is piloted on the BBC North Home Service
- June – My Word! is piloted on the BBC Midland Home Service, chaired by John Arlott
- 17 August – Floggit's featuring Elsie and Doris Waters opens on the BBC Light Programme (1956–1959), including Ronnie Barker's radio debut
- 8 October – The Spice of Life on the BBC Home Service (1956–1957)
- Movie-Go-Round on the BBC Light Programme (1956–1969)

== Continuing radio programmes ==
=== 1930s ===
- In Town Tonight (1933–1960)

=== 1940s ===
- Music While You Work (1940–1967)
- Sunday Half Hour (1940–2018)
- Desert Island Discs (1942–Present)
- Family Favourites (1945–1980)
- Down Your Way (1946–1992)
- Have A Go (1946–1967)
- Housewives' Choice (1946–1967)
- Letter from America (1946–2004)
- Woman's Hour (1946–Present)
- Twenty Questions (1947–1976)
- Any Questions? (1948–Present)
- Mrs Dale's Diary (1948–1969)
- Take It from Here (1948–1960)
- Billy Cotton Band Show (1949–1968)
- A Book at Bedtime (1949–Present)
- Ray's a Laugh (1949–1961)

=== 1950s ===
- The Archers (1950–Present)
- Educating Archie (1950–1960)
- Listen with Mother (1950–1982)
- The Goon Show (1951–1960)
- Hancock's Half Hour (1954–1959)
- From Our Own Correspondent (1955–Present)
- Pick of the Pops (1955–Present)

== Births ==
- 6 January – Angus Deayton, actor and television presenter
- 9 January – Imelda Staunton, actress
- 21 January – Ian McMillan, poet and broadcaster
- 14 February – Tom Watt, radio presenter, journalist and actor
- 1 March – Helen Boaden, broadcasting executive
- 4 May – Charlotte Green, radio newsreader and announcer
- 2 June – Susan Rae, Scottish radio newsreader and announcer
- 6 June – Vaughan Savidge, radio newsreader and announcer
- 7 July – Jonathan Kydd, actor
- 2 October – John Pienaar, political journalist
- 30 October – Juliet Stevenson, actress
- 8 November – Richard Curtis, scriptwriter
- 27 November – John McCarthy, journalist
- 26 December – Simon Fanshawe, writer and broadcaster
- 29 December – Fred MacAulay, Scottish comedian

== Deaths ==
- 20 May – Sir Max Beerbohm, theatre critic, humorist and broadcaster (born 1872)

== See also ==
- 1956 in British music
- 1956 in British television
- 1956 in the United Kingdom
- List of British films of 1956
