= 1956 in British television =

This is a list of British television related events from 1956.

== Events ==
=== February ===
- 12 February–1 April – BBC Television Children's Department screens Jesus of Nazareth, an 8-part Sunday afternoon dramatisation of the Gospel story directed by Joy Harington with Tom Fleming as the adult Jesus, performed live with inserts filmed in the Holy Land.
- 17 February – The Midlands becomes the first part of the UK outside London to receive ITV, when ATV Midlands begins broadcasting their weekday franchise. The weekend franchise, ABC, appears a day later.
- 24 February – Associated-Rediffusion begins showing a sequence of comedy sketch shows (The Idiot Weekly, Price 2d, A Show Called Fred and Son of Fred) largely scripted by Spike Milligan and starring Peter Sellers that attempt to translate the surreal humour of radio's The Goon Show to television. Although this baffles some viewers, leading to complaints, there is also praise for Milligan pioneering a wholly televisual style of comedy.

=== March ===
- 28 March – Television transmissions begin from the new Crystal Palace site in south London for the BBC.

=== April ===
- 28 April – ITV, at this point available only in the London and Midlands areas, shows cricket for the first time, when it broadcasts the Australian touring team's match against the Duke of Norfolk's XI at Arundel Castle.

=== May ===
- 3 May – Granada Television begins broadcasting, extending ITV's coverage to Northern England from Winter Hill transmitting station, but starts broadcasting across Yorkshire (part of Granada's region until 1968) only in late Autumn. ABC's weekend franchise begins two days later.
- 10 May – British TV debut of Gunsmoke as Gun Law, on ITV. The TV programme will have a 20 year run on ITV before moving to other channels.
- 24 May – The BBC broadcasts the very first Eurovision Song Contest, live from Switzerland. However no act or artist was chosen by the BBC to represent the United Kingdom, due to the competition clashing with the short-lived Festival of British Popular Songs.

=== June ===
- 18 June – Irish playwright Brendan Behan is drunk when interviewed by Malcolm Muggeridge on the BBC's Panorama and for the first time on British television utters the word "fuck".

=== July ===
- 6 July – Hancock's Half Hour debuts on the BBC Television.
- 8 July – The anthology drama series Armchair Theatre, produced by ABC Weekend TV for the ITV network, begins its run (until 1974).
- 31 July – The BBC shows Glorious Goodwood for the first time.

=== September ===
- 15 September – The Adventures of Sir Lancelot debuts on ITV. After being sold to the NBC network in the United States, it later becomes the first British television series ever to be made in colour. It premieres in the United States on 24 September.

=== October ===
- 31 October – On popular ITV television talk show Free Speech, an especially bitter debate on the Suez Crisis takes place, with leftist historian A. J. P. Taylor and Labour journalist and future party leader Michael Foot calling their fellow-panellist, Conservative MP Robert Boothby, a "criminal" for supporting the war.

=== November ===
- 3 November – The Emley Moor transmitting station enters service, broadcasting ITV programmes to Yorkshire from its original lattice tower.
- 8 November – The BBC airs a drama, Man From the Sun, concerning racial prejudice in the UK.
- 28 November – Granada broadcasts a live production of John Osborne's influential new play Look Back in Anger from its Manchester studio in the ITV Play of the Week strand (the BBC had broadcast an extract on 16 October).
- November – Rowntree's launch their long-running ITV advertising campaign using the slogan "Don't forget the fruit gums, Mum."

=== December ===
- 25 December
  - Christmas Day highlights include the British TV debut of The Lone Ranger on BBC TV.
  - PG Tips launch their long-running ITV advertising campaign using a chimpanzees' tea party with voices provided by Peter Sellers.

=== Unknown ===
- Trade test colour films are broadcast on BBC Television for the first time

== Debuts ==
=== BBC Television Service/BBC TV ===
- 8 January – Space School (1956)
- 12 January – Strictly T-T (1956)
- 17 January – The Frontiers of Science (1956–1960; 1968–1969)
- 21 January – Tales from Soho (1956)
- 5 February – The White Falcon (1956)
- 21 February – Nathaniel Titlark (1956)
- 24 February – Jane Eyre (1956)
- 8 March – Men in Battle (1956–1957)
- 10 March – My Friend Charles (1956)
- 29 March – Billy Cotton Band Show (1956–1968)
- 5 April – Double Cross (1956)
- 6 April – Diving To Adventure (1956)
- 10 April – Picture Parade (1956–1962)
- 15 April – Rex Milligan (1956)
- 21 April – Opportunity Murder (1956)
- 7 May – The Adventures of the Big Man (1956)
- 24 May – Eurovision Song Contest (1956–present)
- 4 July – Abigail and Roger (1956)
- 6 July – Hancock's Half Hour (1956–1961)
- 21 August – The Black Tulip (1956)
- 25 August – Bill Radford: Reporter (1956)
- 28 September – David Copperfield (1956)
- 4 October – Whack-O! (1956–1960, 1971–1972)
- 6 October – Potts in Parovia (1956)
- 20 October – The Other Man (1956)
- 28 October
  - Kidnapped (1956)
  - The Recording Angells (1956)
- 10 November – Evans Abode (1956)
- 13 November – The Watch Tower (1956)
- 1 December
  - The Norman Wisdom Show (1956)
  - The Crime of the Century (1956)
- 25 December – The Lone Ranger (1949–1957)
- 28 December – Vanity Fair (1956–1957)
- Unknown – Champion the Wonder Horse (1956–1957)

=== ITV ===
- 6 January – This Week (1956–1978, 1986–1992)
- 16 February – Alfred Marks Time (1956–1961)
- 20 February – The Count of Monte Cristo (1956)
- 24 February – The Idiot Weekly, Price 2d
- 2 March – I'm Not Bothered (1956)
- 27 April – The Tony Hancock Show (1956–1957)
- 2 May – A Show Called Fred (1956)
- 7 May – The Monday Club (1956–1958)
- 8 May – Zoo Time (1956–1968)
- 9 May – Gunsmoke (1955–1975)
- 10 May – Spot the Tune (1956–1962)
- 19 May – My Sister and I (1956)
- 19 May – The 64,000 Question (1956–1958)
- 8 June – Palais Party (1956–1959)
- 9 June – Those Kids (1956)
- 20 June – Opportunity Knocks (1956–1978, 1987–1990)
- Undated in June – ITV Wimbledon (1956–1968)
- 8 July – Armchair Theatre (1956–1974)
- 20 July – My Husband and I (1956)
- 31 July – The Crimson Ramblers (1956)
- 14 August – Two for the Money (1956–1957)
- 15 September
  - The Adventures of Aggie (1956–1957)
  - The Adventures of Sir Lancelot (1956–1957)
  - Assignment Foreign Legion (1956)
  - Wyatt Earp (1955–1961)
  - The Strange World of Planet X (1956)
- 17 September
  - Sailor of Fortune (1955–1956)
  - Son of Fred (1956)
- 18 September – Do You Trust Your Wife? (1956–1957)
- 19 September – The Buccaneers (1956–1957)
- 20 September – Over to William (1956)
- 2 October – My Wife's Sister (1956–1957)
- 3 November – Dr. Jekyll and Mr. Hyde (1956)
- 5 November – What the Papers Say (1956–2008)
- 1 December – The Errol Flynn Theatre (1956–1957)
- 15 December – The Trollenberg Terror (1956)
- 24 December – Boyd Q.C. (1956–1964)
- 31 December – Cool for Cats (1956–1961)
- Unknown
  - Alfred Hitchcock Presents (1956–1967)
  - Highway Patrol (1956–1960)
  - The Bob Cummings Show (1955–1959)

== Television shows ==
=== 1920s ===
- BBC Wimbledon (1927–1939, 1946–2019, 2021–present)

=== 1930s ===
- Trooping the Colour (1937–1939, 1946–2019, 2023–present)
- The Boat Race (1938–1939, 1946–2019, 2021–present)
- BBC Cricket (1939, 1946–1999, 2020–2024)

=== 1940s ===
- The Ed Sullivan Show (1948–1971)
- Come Dancing (1949–1998)

=== 1950s ===
- Andy Pandy (1950–1970, 2002–2005)
- What's My Line? (1951–1963)
- Flower Pot Men (1952–1958, 2001–2002)
- Watch with Mother (1952–1975)
- The Appleyards (1952–1957)
- All Your Own (1952–1961)
- Rag, Tag and Bobtail (1953–1965)
- The Good Old Days (1953–1983)
- Panorama (1953–present)
- The Grove Family (1954–1957)
- Zoo Quest (1954–1963)
- The Woodentops (1955–1958)
- Strange Experiences (1955–1962)
- The Adventures of Robin Hood (1955–1960)
- Picture Book (1955–1965)
- Sunday Night at the London Palladium (1955–1967, 1973–1974)
- Take Your Pick! (1955–1968, 1992–1998)
- Double Your Money (1955–1968)
- Dixon of Dock Green (1955–1976)
- Crackerjack (1955–1970, 1972–1984, 2020–2021)

== Ending this year ==
- Fabian of the Yard (1954–1956)

== Births ==
- 6 January – Angus Deayton, actor and television presenter
- 9 January – Imelda Staunton, actress
- 25 January – Bill Turnbull, television presenter (died 2022)
- 8 February – Richard Sharp, banker and Chairman of the BBC
- 14 February – Tom Watt, radio presenter, journalist and actor
- 11 March – Helen Rollason, sports journalist and television presenter (died 1999)
- 19 April – Sue Barker, tennis player and television presenter
- 20 April – Georgie Glen, Scottish actress
- 26 April – Koo Stark, American-born actress
- 13 May – Richard Madeley, television presenter
- 28 May – Julie Peasgood, actress, author and television presenter
- 1 June – Louise Plowright, actress (died 2016)
- 10 October – Amanda Burton, actress
- 11 October – Neil Buchanan, artist, presenter and musician
- 30 October – Juliet Stevenson, actress
- 16 November – Lorraine Heggessey, television executive
- 28 November – Lucy Gutteridge, actress
- 7 December – Anna Soubry, television journalist, barrister and politician

== See also ==
- 1956 in British music
- 1956 in the United Kingdom
- List of British films of 1956
