= List of British films of 1956 =

A list of films produced in the United Kingdom in 1956 (see 1956 in film):

== 1956 ==
Title	Director	Cast	Genre	Notes
1956
1984	Michael Anderson	Edmond O'Brien, Michael Redgrave, Jan Sterling	Science-fiction	
Assignment Redhead	Maclean Rogers	Richard Denning, Carole Mathews, Ronald Adam	Crime	
The Baby and the Battleship	Jay Lewis	John Mills, Richard Attenborough, Michael Hordern	Comedy	
The Battle of the River Plate	Michael Powell, Emeric Pressburger	John Gregson, Anthony Quayle, Peter Finch	World War II	
Behind the Headlines	Charles Saunders	Paul Carpenter, Adrienne Corri, Hazel Court	Crime	
The Bespoke Overcoat	Jack Clayton	Alfie Bass, Alan Tilvern	Drama	Short film
Beyond Mombasa	George Marshall	Cornel Wilde, Donna Reed, Leo Genn	Adventure	Co-production with US
Bhowani Junction	George Cukor	Ava Gardner, Stewart Granger, Bill Travers	Adventure	
The Black Tent	Brian Desmond Hurst	Donald Sinden, Anthony Steel, Anna Maria Sandri	War	
Bond of Fear	Henry Cass	Dermot Walsh, Jane Barrett, John Colicos	Drama	
The Case of the Mukkinese Battle-Horn	Joseph Sterling	Peter Sellers, Spike Milligan	Comedy	Short film
Charley Moon	Guy Hamilton	Max Bygraves, Dennis Price	Musical	
Checkpoint	Ralph Thomas	Anthony Steel, Stanley Baker	Drama	
Child in the House	Cy Endfield, Charles De la Tour	Phyllis Calvert, Eric Portman	Drama	
Cloak Without Dagger	Joseph Sterling	Philip Friend, Mary Mackenzie, Leslie Dwyer	Thriller	
Doublecross	Anthony Squire	Donald Houston, Fay Compton	Thriller	
Dry Rot	Maurice Elvey	Ronald Shiner, Brian Rix	Comedy	
The Extra Day	William Fairchild	Richard Basehart, Simone Simon	Comedy/drama	
Eyewitness	Muriel Box	Donald Sinden, Muriel Pavlow	Thriller	
The Feminine Touch	Pat Jackson	George Baker, Belinda Lee	Drama	
Find the Lady	Charles Saunders	Donald Houston, Beverley Brooks, Mervyn Johns	Comedy	
Fire Maidens from Outer Space	Cy Roth	Anthony Dexter, Susan Shaw	Science-fiction	
The Gamma People	John Gilling	Paul Douglas, Eva Bartok, Leslie Phillips	Science-fiction	
The Gelignite Gang	Terence Fisher	Wayne Morris, Sandra Dorne	Crime	
The Green Man	Sidney Gilliat	Alastair Sim, George Cole	Comedy/drama	
Guilty?	Edmond T. Gréville	John Justin, Barbara Laage, Donald Wolfit	Crime	Co-production with France
High Terrace	Henry Cass	Dale Robertson, Lois Maxwell, Derek Bond, Eric Pohlmann	Mystery	
A Hill in Korea	Julian Amyes	George Baker, Harry Andrews	Korean War	
The Hostage	Harold Huth	Ron Randell, Mary Parker	Thriller	
House of Secrets	Guy Green	Michael Craig, Julia Arnall, Barbara Bates	Thriller	
The Intimate Stranger	Richard Basehart	Mary Murphy, Constance Cummings, Roger Livesey	Drama	
The Iron Petticoat	Ralph Thomas	Bob Hope, Katharine Hepburn	Comedy	
It's Great to Be Young	Cyril Frankel	John Mills, Cecil Parker	Comedy/musical	
It's Never Too Late	Michael McCarthy	Phyllis Calvert, Patrick Barr	Comedy	
It's a Wonderful World	Val Guest	George Cole, Terence Morgan, Kathleen Harrison	Musical	
Jacqueline	Roy Ward Baker	John Gregson, Kathleen Ryan	Drama	
Johnny, You're Wanted	Vernon Sewell	John Slater, Garry Marsh	Crime	
Jumping for Joy	John Paddy Carstairs	Frankie Howerd, Stanley Holloway	Comedy	
Keep It Clean	David Paltenghi	Ronald Shiner, Joan Sims	Comedy	
The Last Man to Hang	Terence Fisher	Tom Conway, Elizabeth Sellars	Crime	
Laughing in the Sunshine	Daniel Birt	Jane Hylton, Bengt Logardt, Adolf Jahr	Romance	Co-production with Sweden
The Long Arm	Charles Frend	Jack Hawkins, John Stratton	Crime	Entered into the 6th Berlin International Film Festival
Loser Takes All	Ken Annakin	Glynis Johns, Rossano Brazzi, Robert Morley	Comedy	
Lost	Guy Green	David Farrar, David Knight	Thriller	
The Man Who Never Was	Ronald Neame	Clifton Webb, Ewen Montagu, Gloria Grahame	World War II	
The March Hare	George More O'Ferrall	Peggy Cummins, Terence Morgan	Comedy	
My Teenage Daughter	Herbert Wilcox	Anna Neagle, Sylvia Syms	Drama	
My Wife's Family	Gilbert Gunn	Ted Ray, Greta Gynt	Comedy	
Not So Dusty	Maclean Rogers	Bill Owen, Leslie Dwyer	Comedy	
Now and Forever	Mario Zampi	Janette Scott, Kay Walsh	Drama	
Odongo	John Gilling	Rhonda Fleming, Juma	African adventure	
Pacific Destiny	Wolf Rilla	Denholm Elliott, Susan Stephen	Drama	
Port Afrique	Rudolph Maté	Pier Angeli, Philip Carey	Drama	
Port of Escape	Tony Young	Googie Withers, John McCallum	Thriller	
Portrait of Alison	Guy Green	Robert Beatty, Terry Moore	Crime	Also known as Postmark for Danger
Private's Progress	John Boulting	Ian Carmichael, Richard Attenborough, Dennis Price	Comedy	
Ramsbottom Rides Again	John Baxter	Arthur Askey, Glenn Melvyn	Comedy/western	
Reach for the Sky	Lewis Gilbert	Kenneth More, Muriel Pavlow	Biopic/World War II	
Safari	Terence Young	Victor Mature, Janet Leigh	African adventure	
Sailor Beware!	Gordon Parry	Peggy Mount, Shirley Eaton	Comedy	
Satellite in the Sky	John Dickson	Kieron Moore, Lois Maxwell	Science-fiction	
The Secret Tent	Don Chaffey	Donald Gray, Andree Melly	Crime	
Seven Years in Tibet	Hans Nieter		Documentary	Entered into the 1956 Cannes Film Festival
The Silken Affair	Roy Kellino	David Niven, Geneviève Page	Comedy	
Soho Incident	Vernon Sewell	Faith Domergue, Lee Patterson	Crime	Also known as Spin a Dark Web
The Spanish Gardener	Philip Leacock	Dirk Bogarde, Jon Whiteley, Michael Hordern	Drama	Entered into the 7th Berlin International Film Festival
Stars in Your Eyes	Maurice Elvey	Nat Jackley, Patricia Kirkwood	Musical	
Three Men in a Boat	Ken Annakin	Laurence Harvey, Jimmy Edwards, David Tomlinson, Shirley Eaton, Lisa Gastoni	Comedy	
Thunderstorm	John Guillermin	Carlos Thompson, Linda Christian	Drama	
Tiger in the Smoke	Roy Ward Baker	Donald Sinden, Muriel Pavlow	Crime	
Together	Lorenza Mazzetti	Michael Andrews, Eduardo Paolozzi	Free Cinema	
Tons of Trouble	Leslie S. Hiscott	Richard Hearne, William Hartnell	Comedy	
A Touch of the Sun	Gordon Parry	Frankie Howerd, Ruby Murray	Comedy	
A Town Like Alice	Jack Lee	Virginia McKenna, Peter Finch	Romance/drama	
Who Done It?	Basil Dearden	Benny Hill, Belinda Lee, David Kossoff	Comedy	
Wicked as They Come	Ken Hughes	Arlene Dahl, Philip Carey	Crime	
Women Without Men	Elmo Williams, Herbert Glazer	Joan Rice, Gordon Jackson	Crime	
X the Unknown	Leslie Norman	Dean Jagger, Edward Chapman	Sci-fi	
Yield to the Night	J. Lee Thompson	Diana Dors, Yvonne Mitchell, Michael Craig	Drama	
Zarak	Terence Young	Victor Mature, Anita Ekberg	Adventure	

== See also ==
- 1956 in British music
- 1956 in British television
- 1956 in the United Kingdom
