= 1956 in British music =

This is a summary of 1956 in music in the United Kingdom, including the official charts from that year.

== Events ==
- February – Release of Shirley Bassey's first single, Burn My Candle (At Both Ends).
- 8 May – Benjamin Britten's opera Gloriana, written in 1953, is given its US première in Cincinnati, in concert form, conducted by Josef Krips.
- 14 May – Ralph Vaughan Williams's Symphony No. 8 receives its first London performance.
- June – Arthur Bliss heads the first delegation by British musicians to the Soviet Union since the end of the Second World War. The party included the violinist Alfredo Campoli, the oboist Léon Goossens, the soprano Jennifer Vyvyan and the pianist Gerald Moore.
- 17 August – Bacchanale by Ibert, a commission by the BBC to mark the tenth anniversary of the Third Programme, is performed at the Proms with the composer in the audience.
- 13 November – The first of a series of Hoffnung Music Festival Concerts takes place at the Royal Festival Hall, in London.
- 31 December – Flanders and Swann launch their two-man revue At the Drop of a Hat.

== Charts ==
- See UK No.1 Hits of 1956

== Classical music: new works ==
- Arthur Bliss
  - Edinburgh Overture, for orchestra
  - Seek the Lord (anthem), SATB choir and organ
- Reginald Smith Brindle – El Polifemo de Oro
- Benjamin Britten
  - Antiphon, Op. 56b, for SATB choir and organ
  - The Prince of the Pagodas, Op. 57 (ballet in three acts)
- Peter Maxwell Davies – Sonata for Clarinet and Piano
- Stephen Dodgson – Concerto No. 1 for Guitar and Orchestra
- Cecil Armstrong Gibbs – Threnody
- Gordon Jacob
  - Concerto No. 2 for Oboe and Orchestra
  - Sextet for Piano and Wind Quintet
  - Trio for Violin, Cello and Piano
  - Variations on "Annie Laurie", for two piccolos, two contrabass clarinets, heckelphone, two contrabassoons, serpent, contrabass serpent, subcontrabass tuba, harmonium and hurdy-gurdy
- Michael Tippett
  - Bonny at Morn (arr. of Northumbrian folksong), unison choir and three recorders
  - Songs from the British Isles (4), SATB choir
- Ralph Vaughan Williams
  - A Choral Flourish (text from the Psalms), for SATB choir, two trumpets and organ
  - God Bless the Master of This House, for SATB choir
  - Preludes on Welsh Folksongs (2), for organ
  - Symphony No. 8
  - A Vision of Aeroplanes (text: N. Ezekiel), motet for SATB choir and organ
- William Walton – Cello Concerto

== Opera ==
- Malcolm Arnold – The Open Window, Op. 56 (opera in one act, libretto by S. Gilliat, after Saki)
- Alan Bush – Men of Blackmoor, with libretto by Nancy Bush, premiered at the German National Theatre, Weimar

== Film and Incidental music ==
- Malcolm Arnold – 1984, starring Edmond O'Brien, Donald Pleasence, Jan Sterling and Michael Redgrave.
- Brian Easdale – The Battle of the River Plate by director-writer team of Michael Powell and Emeric Pressburger, starring John Gregson, Anthony Quayle and Peter Finch.
- Edward Williams – Doublecross directed by Anthony Squire, starring Donald Houston, Fay Compton and William Hartnell.

== Musical theatre ==
- Grab Me a Gondola by James Gilbert and Julien More, starring Denis Quilley

== Musical films ==
- The Good Companions, starring Eric Portman
- It's a Wonderful World, starring George Cole and featuring Ted Heath and Dennis Lotis
- It's Great to Be Young, starring John Mills and Cecil Parker
- Stars in Your Eyes, starring Nat Jackley and Patricia Kirkwood
- A Touch of the Sun, starring Frankie Howerd, Ruby Murray and Dennis Price

== Births ==
- 1 January – Andy Gill, guitarist and singer-songwriter
- 17 January – Paul Young, singer and guitarist
- 25 January – Andy Cox (The Beat, Fine Young Cannibals)
- 31 January – Johnny Rotten, singer (Sex Pistols)
- 12 February – Brian Robertson, Scottish guitarist and songwriter (Thin Lizzy, Motörhead, Wild Horses)
- 13 February – Peter Hook, singer and bass player (Joy Division, New Order, Freebass, Revenge, Monaco)
- 12 March – Steve Harris, musician, composer (Iron Maiden)
- 3 June – Lynne Dawson, operatic soprano
- 4 June – Richard Butler, singer-songwriter
- 5 July
  - Terry Chimes, drummer (The Clash, Generation X, Hanoi Rocks, Cowboys International)
  - Billy Jenkins, guitarist and composer
- 15 July – Ian Curtis, vocalist (Joy Division) (died 1980)
- 19 July –Nikki Sudden, English singer-songwriter and guitarist (Jacobites, Swell Maps) (d. 2006)
- 20 July
  - Paul Cook, English drummer (Sex Pistols, The Professionals, Chiefs of Relief, Man Raze)
  - Michael Gordon, American composer
- 27 August – Glen Matlock, guitarist (Sex Pistols)
- 12 September – B. A. Robertson, singer-songwriter
- 27 October – Hazell Dean, singer
- 17 November – Philip Grange, composer
- 19 December – Jimmy Cauty, artist and musician
- 28 December – Nigel Kennedy, violinist

== Deaths ==
- 9 March – Amanda Aldridge ('Montague Ring'), opera singer, teacher and composer, 89
- 16 March – Joseph John Richards, conductor, composer and music teacher, 77
- 9 April – Jack Little, composer, actor, singer and songwriter
- 16 May – Orlando Morgan, music teacher, composer and musicologist, 91
- 18 July – Violet Loraine, musical theatre star, 69
- 6 September – Felix Borowski, British/American composer and teacher, 84
- 27 September – Gerald Finzi, composer, 55 ("severe brain inflammation")
- 11 October – Harry Parry, jazz clarinetist and bandleader, 44
- 8 December – Edgar Bainton, church music composer, 76
- 9 December – Ethel Scarborough, pianist and composer, 76
- date unknown – George Oldroyd, organist and composer

== Awards ==
=== Ivor Novello Awards ===
- Best Song Musically and Lyrically – Mátyás Seiber & Norman Newell, "By the Fountains of Rome"

== See also ==
- 1956 in British television
- 1956 in the United Kingdom
- List of British films of 1956
