= 1956 in film =

The following is an overview of 1956 in film, with The Ten Commandments dominating the U.S. box office and becoming one of the highest-grossing films of all time (unadjusted for inflation) and Around the World in 80 Days winning the Academy Award for Best Picture.

== Top-grossing films (U.S.) ==
The top ten 1956 released films by box office gross in North America are as follows:

Highest-grossing films of 1956
Rank	Title	Distributor	Domestic rentals
1	The Ten Commandments	Paramount	$34,200,000
2	Around the World in 80 Days	United Artists	$22,000,000
3	Giant	Warner Bros.	$12,000,000
4	Seven Wonders of the World	Cinerama Releasing	$9,300,000
5	The King and I	20th Century Fox	$8,500,000
6	Trapeze	United Artists	$7,300,000
7	War and Peace	Paramount	$6,250,000
8	High Society	MGM	$5,602,000
9	The Teahouse of the August Moon	MGM	$5,550,000
10	The Eddy Duchin Story	Columbia	$5,300,000

== Events ==
- February 5 – First showing of documentary films by the Free Cinema movement, at the National Film Theatre, London.
- February 16 – Carousel is the first film released that was shot in CinemaScope 55.
- February 23
  - Arthur B. Krim and Robert Benjamin acquire Mary Pickford's interest in United Artists for $3 million giving them full ownership of UA.
  - Norma Jean Mortenson alters to Marilyn Monroe.
- February – Warner Bros. sells much of its pre-1950 library to Associated Artists Productions (a.a.p.); after a series of mergers the films return to WB 40 years later.
- February – Darryl F. Zanuck announces his resignation as head of production of 20th Century Fox after 20 years as the studio head. He is later replaced by Buddy Adler.
- April 18 – Grace Kelly marries Prince Rainier III and becomes Princess consort of Monaco. She stops acting. Her last feature film, High Society, is released in July.
- May 30 – United Artists release Trapeze which becomes their highest-grosser until surpassed by Around the World in 80 Days the following year.
- June 28 - The King and I is released in the United States.
- July – Harry and Albert Warner sell their stock in Warner Bros. Jack L. Warner retains his and becomes president.
- July 25 – The comedy partnership between Dean Martin and Jerry Lewis ends. Their last film together, Hollywood or Bust, is released later in the year.
- August 4 – The last film serial, Blazing the Overland Trail from Columbia Pictures, is released.
- October 5 – The Ten Commandments opens in cinemas. It was the most expensive film of all time with a cost of $13 million and becomes one of the most successful and popular films of all time, currently ranking 6th on the list of all time moneymakers (when adjusted for inflation). It was director Cecil B. DeMille's last film.
- October 17 – Mike Todd's Around the World in 80 Days is released and goes on to become United Artists' highest-grossing film.
- October 18 – Joseph Vogel becomes president of MGM.
- November 1 – The film Oklahoma!, released in 1955 to select cities in Todd-AO, now receives a U.S. national release in CinemaScope, since not all theatres are yet equipped for Todd-AO. To accomplish this, the film has actually been shot twice, rather than printing one version in two different film processes, as is later done.
- November 15 – Elvis Presley's first film, Love Me Tender, opens.
- November 28
  - And God Created Woman opens in France making Brigitte Bardot an international star.
  - It is announced that production head Dore Schary will leave MGM at the end of the year.
- December 14 – Dance with Me, Henry is the last film featuring the comedy duo Abbott and Costello.

== Awards ==
Category/Organization	14th Golden Globe Awards February 28, 1957		29th Academy Awards March 27, 1957
Category/Organization	Drama	Comedy or Musical	29th Academy Awards March 27, 1957
Best Film	Around the World in 80 Days	The King and I	Around the World in 80 Days
Best Director	Elia Kazan; Baby Doll		George Stevens; Giant
Best Actor	Kirk Douglas; Lust for Life	Cantinflas; Around the World in 80 Days	Yul Brynner; The King and I
Best Actress	Ingrid Bergman; Anastasia	Deborah Kerr; The King and I	Ingrid Bergman; Anastasia
Best Supporting Actor	Earl Holliman; The Rainmaker		Anthony Quinn; Lust for Life
Best Supporting Actress	Eileen Heckart; The Bad Seed		Dorothy Malone; Written on the Wind
Best Foreign Language Film	Before Sundown; A Girl in Black; Roses on the Arm; War and Peace; The White Reindeer		La Strada

== Top ten money making stars ==
Rank	Actor/Actress
1.	William Holden
2.	John Wayne
3.	James Stewart
4.	Burt Lancaster
5.	Glenn Ford
6.	Dean Martin and Jerry Lewis
7.	Marilyn Monroe
8.	Gary Cooper
9.	Kim Novak
10.	Frank Sinatra

== 1956 film releases ==
=== January–March ===
- January 1956
  - 11 January
    - The Lieutenant Wore Skirts
  - 12 January
    - Diane
  - 26 January
    - Helen of Troy
  - 29 January
    - Warning from Space (Japan)
- February 1956
  - 5 February
    - Invasion of the Body Snatchers
  - 16 February
    - Carousel
  - 25 February
    - The Lone Ranger
- March 1956
  - 3 March
    - Forbidden Planet
  - 6 March
    - 1984 (U.K.)
  - 9 March
    - Come Next Spring
    - Meet Me in Las Vegas
  - 10 March
    - Never Say Goodbye
  - 21 March
    - Rock Around the Clock
  - 23 March
    - Serenade
  - 24 March
    - Raw Edge
  - 25 March
    - Indestructible Man
    - World Without End
  - 28 March
    - The Conqueror

=== April–June ===
- April 1956
  - 4 April
    - The Maverick Queen
  - 6 April
    - Jubal
  - 10 April
    - Seven Wonders of the World
  - 11 April
    - Backlash
  - 24 April
    - Our Miss Brooks
  - 26 April
    - The Creature Walks Among Us
  - 27 April
    - Godzilla, King of the Monsters!
- May 1956
  - 8 May
    - The Man in the Gray Flannel Suit
  - 9 May
    - The Harder They Fall
  - 15 May
    - Invitation to the Dance
  - 26 May
    - The Searchers
  - 30 May
    - Trapeze
    - While the City Sleeps
    - The Animal World
- June 1956
  - 1 June
    - The Man Who Knew Too Much
  - 6 June
    - The Killing
  - 10 June
    - Crime in the Streets
  - 12 June
    - A Kiss Before Dying
  - 13 June
    - Earth vs. the Flying Saucers
    - Star in the Dust
  - 15 June
    - Gunslinger
  - 20 June
    - Safari
  - 21 June
    - The Eddy Duchin Story
  - 22 June
    - The Catered Affair
  - 27 June
    - Moby Dick
  - 29 June
    - The King and I

=== July–September ===
- July 1956
  - 6 July
    - The Fastest Gun Alive
  - 12 July
    - Foreign Intrigue
  - 15 July
    - It Conquered the World
  - 17 July
    - High Society
  - 18 July
    - Davy Crockett and the River Pirates
  - 23 July
    - Dakota Incident
  - 25 July
    - Pardners
  - 29 July
    - Hold Back the Night
  - 30 July
    - Run for the Sun
- August 1956
- The Beast of Hollow Mountain
  - 1 August
    - Autumn Leaves
  - 3 August
    - Mukh O Mukhosh, highest grossing Dhallywood, Bangladesh film of 1956.
  - 17 August
    - A Cry in the Night
    - These Wilder Years
  - 21 August
    - War and Peace
  - 24 August
    - A Strange Adventure
  - 26 August
    - The Swan
  - 29 August
    - The First Traveling Saleslady
    - The Vagabond King
- September 1956
  - 12 September
    - The Bad Seed
  - 15 September
    - Lust for Life
  - 21 September
    - The Last Wagon
  - 28 September
    - The Best Things in Life Are Free

=== October–December ===
- October 1956
  - 5 October
    - The Ten Commandments
  - 17 October
    - Around the World in 80 Days
    - Attack
    - Julie
  - 26 October
    - The Opposite Sex
  - 31 October
    - Death of a Scoundrel
    - You Can't Run Away from It
- November 1956
  - 1 November
    - Naked Gun
    - The White Squaw
  - 15 November
    - Love Me Tender
    - Gun the Man Down
  - 18 November
    - Yield to the Night (U.K.)
  - 24 November
    - Giant
  - 25 November
    - Friendly Persuasion
  - 29 November
    - The Teahouse of the August Moon
- December 1956
  - 1 December
    - The Mole People
    - The Girl Can't Help It
    - Curucu, Beast of the Amazon
  - 5 December
    - Man Beast
  - 6 December
    - Hollywood or Bust
    - Nightfall
  - 12 December
    - Bundle of Joy
  - 13 December
    - Anastasia
    - The Rainmaker
  - 21 December
    - The King and Four Queens
  - 25 December
    - Written on the Wind
  - 26 December
    - Rodan (Japan)
    - Zarak
  - 29 December
    - Baby Doll
  - The Great Man

== Notable films released in 1956 ==
United States unless stated

=== # ===
- 7th Cavalry, starring Randolph Scott and Barbara Hale
- 23 Paces to Baker Street, starring Van Johnson and Vera Miles
- 1984, directed by Michael Anderson, starring Edmond O'Brien and Michael Redgrave – (GB)

=== A ===
- Accused of Murder, starring Vera Ralston
- Alexander the Great, starring Richard Burton
- Ali Baba and the 40 Thieves (Alibabavum 40 Thirudargalum) – (India)
- The Ambassador's Daughter, starring Olivia de Havilland, Myrna Loy, John Forsythe
- Anastasia, starring Ingrid Bergman and Yul Brynner
- And God Created Woman, directed by Roger Vadim, starring Brigitte Bardot – (France)
- Aparajito (The Unvanquished), directed by Satyajit Ray – (India)
- Around the World in 80 Days, directed by Michael Anderson, starring David Niven, Cantinflas, Shirley MacLaine – Academy Award for Best Picture
- At Gunpoint, starring Fred MacMurray, Walter Brennan, Dorothy Malone
- Attack, a.k.a. Attack!, directed by Robert Aldrich, starring Jack Palance, Eddie Albert, Lee Marvin
- Autumn Leaves, starring Joan Crawford and Cliff Robertson
- Away All Boats, starring Jeff Chandler

=== B ===
- Baby Doll, directed by Elia Kazan, starring Carroll Baker, Karl Malden, Eli Wallach
- Back from Eternity, starring Robert Ryan, Anita Ekberg, Rod Steiger
- Backlash, starring Richard Widmark and Donna Reed
- The Bad Seed, starring Nancy Kelly and Patty McCormack
- Bandido, starring Robert Mitchum
- The Battle of the River Plate, a.k.a. Pursuit of the Graf Spee, written and directed by Powell and Pressburger, starring John Gregson and Peter Finch – (GB)
- Before Sundown (Vor Sonnenuntergang) – (West Germany)
- Behind the Headlines, starring Paul Carpenter and Hazel Court
- The Benny Goodman Story, starring Steve Allen and Donna Reed
- The Best Things in Life Are Free, starring Gordon MacRae, Dan Dailey, Sheree North
- Between Heaven and Hell, directed by Richard Fleischer, starring Robert Wagner and Buddy Ebsen
- Beyond a Reasonable Doubt, directed by Fritz Lang, starring Dana Andrews and Joan Fontaine
- Bhowani Junction, starring Ava Gardner and Stewart Granger – (GB/United States)
- Bigger Than Life, directed by Nicholas Ray, starring James Mason, Barbara Rush, Walter Matthau
- The Birds and the Bees, starring George Gobel and Mitzi Gaynor
- The Black Tent, directed by Brian Desmond Hurst, starring Donald Sinden, Anthony Steel, Anna Maria Sandri & André Morell – (U.K.)
- Bob le flambeur (Bob the Gambler), directed by Jean-Pierre Melville – (France)
- The Bold and the Brave, starring Wendell Corey and Mickey Rooney
- The Boss, starring John Payne and Doe Avedon
- The Bottom of the Bottle, directed by Henry Hathaway, starring Van Johnson, Joseph Cotten, Ruth Roman
- The Brave One, directed by Irving Rapper
- The Burmese Harp (Biruma no tategoto), directed by Kon Ichikawa – (Japan)
- The Burning Hills, starring Natalie Wood and Tab Hunter
- Bus Stop, starring Marilyn Monroe and Don Murray

=== C ===
- C.I.D., starring Dev Anand – (India)
- Calabuch (a.k.a. The Rocket from Calabuch), directed by Luis García Berlanga, starring Edmund Gwenn and Valentina Cortese – (Spain)
- Calle Mayor (Main Street), directed by Juan Antonio Bardem, starring Betsy Blair – (Spain)
- Carnival Night (Karnavalnaya noch) – (USSR)
- Carousel, directed by Henry King, starring Shirley Jones and Gordon MacRae
- The Case of the Mukkinese Battle Horn, comedy short starring Peter Sellers, Spike Milligan, Dick Emery – (GB)
- The Catered Affair, starring Bette Davis, Ernest Borgnine, Debbie Reynolds
- Checkpoint (1956 film), directed by Ralph Thomas, starring Anthony Steel, Odile Versois, Stanley Baker & James Robertson Justice – (U.K.)
- Child of Sorrow (Anak dalita) – (Philippines)
- Chori Chori, starring Nargis and Raj Kapoor – (India)
- Comanche, starring Dana Andrews and Linda Cristal
- Come Next Spring, starring Ann Sheridan and Steve Cochran
- Congo Crossing, starring Virginia Mayo and Peter Lorre
- The Conqueror, directed by Dick Powell, starring John Wayne (as Genghis Khan)
- The Court Jester, starring Danny Kaye
- Crazed Fruit (Kurutta kajitsu), directed by Kō Nakahira – (Japan)
- Crime Against Joe, starring Julie London
- Crime in the Streets, directed by Don Siegel, starring James Whitmore and John Cassavetes
- A Cry in the Night, starring Edmond O'Brien, Natalie Wood, Raymond Burr

=== D ===
- D-Day the Sixth of June, starring Robert Taylor
- Dakota Incident, starring Dale Robertson
- Dance with Me, Henry, starring Bud Abbott and Lou Costello
- Death in the Garden (La mort en ce jardin), directed by Luis Buñuel, starring Simone Signoret and Charles Vanel – (France)
- Death of a Scoundrel, starring George Sanders and Zsa Zsa Gabor
- Diane, starring Lana Turner in her final MGM film after nearly 20 years with the studio
- Donatella, directed by Mario Monicelli, starring Elsa Martinelli – (Italy)
- Don't Look Back, My Son (Ne okreći se sine) – (Yugoslavia)
- The Dragon (O Drakos) – (Greece)

=== E ===
- Early Spring (Soshun), directed by Yasujirō Ozu – (Japan)
- Earth vs. the Flying Saucers, starring Hugh Marlowe
- The Eddy Duchin Story, starring Tyrone Power and Kim Novak
- Elena and Her Men, starring Ingrid Bergman – (France/Italy)

=== F ===
- The Fastest Gun Alive, starring Glenn Ford and Broderick Crawford
- The First Texan, starring Joel McCrea
- The First Traveling Saleslady, starring Ginger Rogers, Barry Nelson, Carol Channing
- Forbidden Planet, starring Walter Pidgeon, Leslie Nielsen, Anne Francis
- Forever, Darling, starring Desi Arnaz, Lucille Ball, James Mason
- Friendly Persuasion, directed by William Wyler, starring Gary Cooper, Dorothy McGuire, Anthony Perkins
- Funtoosh (Funny Man), starring Dev Anand – (India)

=== G ===
- Gaby, starring Leslie Caron
- Gervaise, directed by René Clément, starring Maria Schell – (France)
- Giant, directed by George Stevens, starring Elizabeth Taylor, Rock Hudson and James Dean in his final film
- The Girl Can't Help It, starring Tom Ewell and Jayne Mansfield in her first starring role
- The Girl He Left Behind, starring Tab Hunter and Natalie Wood
- A Girl in Black, directed by Michael Cacoyannis – winner of Golden Globe – (Greece)
- Godzilla, King of the Monsters! directed by Terry Morse and Ishirō Honda, starring Raymond Burr and Takashi Shimura – (Japan/United States)
- Good-bye, My Lady, directed by William A. Wellman, starring Brandon deWilde, Walter Brennan, Phil Harris
- Great Day in the Morning, directed by Jacques Tourneur, starring Robert Stack and Virginia Mayo
- The Great Locomotive Chase, starring Fess Parker and Jeffrey Hunter
- The Great Man, directed by and starring José Ferrer, with Julie London, Keenan Wynn, Ed Wynn
- The Green Man, starring Alastair Sim, George Cole, Terry-Thomas – (GB)
- Gun the Man Down, starring James Arness and Angie Dickinson in her film debut
- Gunslinger, directed by Roger Corman, starring John Ireland and Beverly Garland

=== H ===
- The Harder They Fall, starring Humphrey Bogart in his final film
- The Harvest Month (Elokuu) – (Finland)
- Helen of Troy, starring Rossana Podestà, Stanley Baker
- High Society, starring Bing Crosby, Frank Sinatra and Grace Kelly in her final film
- Hilda Crane, starring Jean Simmons
- Hold Back the Night, starring John Payne
- Hollywood or Bust, starring Dean Martin and Jerry Lewis, with Anita Ekberg, in the final Martin and Lewis film
- Hot Blood, starring Jane Russell and Cornel Wilde
- The Houston Story, starring Barbara Hale and Gene Barry
- The Hunchback of Notre Dame, starring Gina Lollobrigida and Anthony Quinn – (France/Italy)

=== I ===
- Ich suche Dich (I Seek You), starring O. W. Fischer and Anouk Aimée – (West Germany)
- The Indian Fighter, starring Kirk Douglas and Walter Matthau
- Invasion of the Body Snatchers, directed by Don Siegel, starring Kevin McCarthy
- Invitation to the Dance, directed by and starring Gene Kelly
- It Conquered the World, directed by Roger Corman, starring Peter Graves and Beverly Garland

=== J ===
- Jagte Raho (Stay Awake), starring Raj Kapoor – (India)
- Johnny Concho, starring Frank Sinatra
- Jubal, starring Glenn Ford, Rod Steiger, Ernest Borgnine, Felicia Farr, Charles Bronson
- Julie, starring Doris Day and Louis Jourdan

=== K ===
- The Killer Is Loose, directed by Budd Boetticher, starring Joseph Cotten, Rhonda Fleming, Wendell Corey
- The Killers, a short film directed by Andrei Tarkovsky – (U.S.S.R.)
- The Killing, directed by Stanley Kubrick, starring Sterling Hayden, Coleen Gray, Marie Windsor, Vince Edwards
- The King and Four Queens, starring Clark Gable
- The King and I, starring Deborah Kerr and Yul Brynner
- A Kiss Before Dying, starring Robert Wagner and Joanne Woodward

=== L ===
- The Last Hunt, directed by Richard Brooks, starring Robert Taylor and Stewart Granger
- The Last Wagon, starring Richard Widmark
- The Leech (Shabab emraa) – (Egypt)
- The Lieutenant Wore Skirts, directed by Frank Tashlin, starring Tom Ewell and Sheree North
- Lisbon, directed by and starring Ray Milland, with Maureen O'Hara and Claude Rains
- The Lone Ranger, starring Clayton Moore and Jay Silverheels
- The Long Arm, starring Jack Hawkins – (GB)
- Love Me Tender, starring Elvis Presley in his film debut
- Lust for Life, starring Kirk Douglas (as Vincent van Gogh) and Anthony Quinn

=== M ===
- A Man Escaped (Un condamné à mort s'est échappé ou Le vent souffle où il veut), directed by Robert Bresson – (France)
- The Man in the Gray Flannel Suit, starring Gregory Peck, Jennifer Jones, Fredric March, Keenan Wynn, Lee J. Cobb
- Man on the Tracks (Człowiek na torze) – (Poland)
- The Man Who Knew Too Much, directed by Alfred Hitchcock (a remake of his own 1934 British film), starring James Stewart and Doris Day
- The Man Who Never Was, starring Clifton Webb and Gloria Grahame – (GB)
- Marie Antoinette Queen of Francem directed by Jean Delannoy, starring Michèle Morgan and Richard Todd – (France)
- The Maverick Queen, starring Barbara Stanwyck and Barry Sullivan
- Meet Me in Las Vegas, starring Cyd Charisse
- Merry-Go-Round (Körhinta) – (Hungary)
- Michel Strogoff
- Miracle in the Rain, starring Jane Wyman
- Moby Dick, directed by John Huston, starring Gregory Peck, Richard Basehart, Leo Genn
- Mukh O Mukhosh (The Face and the Mask) – (East Pakistan)
- The Mystery of Picasso, a documentary featuring Pablo Picasso, directed by Henri-Georges Clouzot

=== N ===
- Naked Gun starring Mara Corday and Willard Parker
- Nagareru (Flowing), directed by Mikio Naruse – (Japan)
- Never Say Goodbye, starring Rock Hudson, David Janssen, Cornell Borchers
- New Delhi – (India)
- Nightfall, starring Aldo Ray, Brian Keith, Anne Bancroft

=== O ===
- Old Khottabych (Starik Khottabych) – (U.S.S.R.)
- On the Threshold of Space, starring Guy Madison
- The Opposite Sex, starring June Allyson, Leslie Nielsen, Joan Collins
- Othello, starring Sergei Bondarchuk – (U.S.S.R.)
- Over-Exposed, starring Cleo Moore

=== P ===
- Pardners, starring Dean Martin and Jerry Lewis
- Patterns, starring Van Heflin and Ed Begley
- Pillars of the Sky, starring Jeff Chandler and Dorothy Malone
- Please Murder Me, starring Angela Lansbury and Raymond Burr
- Poor but Handsome (Poveri ma belli) – (Italy)
- The Power and the Prize, starring Robert Taylor, Burl Ives, Mary Astor, Cedric Hardwicke, Elisabeth Müller
- Private's Progress, a Boulting Brothers film starring Ian Carmichael and Richard Attenborough – (GB)
- Professor Hannibal (Hannibál tanár úr), directed by Zoltán Fábri (Hungary)
- The Proud and Profane, starring William Holden and Deborah Kerr
- The Proud Ones, starring Robert Ryan and Virginia Mayo

=== Q ===
- Qivitoq – (Denmark)

=== R ===
- The Rack, starring Paul Newman, Edmond O'Brien, Walter Pidgeon, Anne Francis, Lee Marvin, and Cloris Leachman
- The Railroad Man (Il Ferroviere), directed by and starring Pietro Germi – (Italy)
- The Rainmaker, starring Burt Lancaster, Katharine Hepburn, Lloyd Bridges and Wendell Corey
- Raj Hath, starring Madhubala – (India)
- Ransom!, starring Glenn Ford and Donna Reed
- Reach for the Sky, a biopic of Douglas Bader starring Kenneth More – (GB)
- The Red Balloon (Le Ballon rouge) – (France)
- The Road of Life (El camino de la vida) – (Mexico)
- Rock Around the Clock, featuring Bill Haley and His Comets
- Rodan, directed by Ishirō Honda – (Japan)
- The Roof (Il Tetto), directed by Vittorio De Sica – (Italy)
- Run for the Sun, starring Richard Widmark, Trevor Howard, Jane Greer

=== S ===
- Samurai III: Duel at Ganryu Island, directed by Hiroshi Inagaki, starring Toshiro Mifune – (Japan)
- The Searchers, directed by John Ford, starring John Wayne, Jeffrey Hunter, Vera Miles, Ward Bond, Ken Curtis, Natalie Wood
- Serenade, directed by Anthony Mann, starring Mario Lanza and Joan Fontaine
- Seven Men from Now, directed by Budd Boetticher, starring Randolph Scott and Lee Marvin
- Seven Wonders of the World, a documentary film directed by Tay Garnett and others
- Seven Years in Tibet – (GB)
- The She-Creature, starring Marla English
- The Silent World, a marine documentary by Jacques-Yves Cousteau and Louis Malle – (France)
- Sira` Fi al-Mina (a.k.a. Dark Water), directed by Youssef Chahine, starring Omar Sharif – (Egypt)
- Slightly Scarlet, starring John Payne and Rhonda Fleming
- The Solid Gold Cadillac, starring Judy Holliday
- Somebody Up There Likes Me, starring Paul Newman
- The Spanish Gardener, starring Dirk Bogarde – (GB)
- The Square Jungle, starring Tony Curtis and Patricia Crowley
- Star in the Dust, starring John Agar and Mamie Van Doren
- Stars in Your Eyes – (GB)
- Storm Center, starring Bette Davis and Kim Hunter
- Street of Shame (Akasen chitai), directed by Kenji Mizoguchi – (Japan)

=== T ===
- Tea and Sympathy, directed by Vincente Minnelli, starring Deborah Kerr and John Kerr
- The Teahouse of the August Moon, starring Marlon Brando and Glenn Ford
- The Ten Commandments, directed by Cecil B. DeMille, starring Charlton Heston, Yul Brynner, Anne Baxter, Yvonne De Carlo, Edward G. Robinson
- There's Always Tomorrow, starring Barbara Stanwyck, Fred MacMurray, Joan Bennett
- Three Brave Men, starring Ray Milland
- Time Table, directed by and starring Mark Stevens, with Felicia Farr
- Toward the Unknown, starring William Holden and Virginia Leith
- A Town Like Alice, starring Virginia McKenna and Peter Finch – (GB)
- Trapeze, directed by Carol Reed, starring Burt Lancaster, Tony Curtis, Gina Lollobrigida
- Tribute to a Bad Man, directed by Robert Wise, starring James Cagney, Irene Papas, Stephen McNally, Don Dubbins, Vic Morrow
- The Twelve Months (Dvenadtsat mesyatsev) – (USSR)

=== U ===
- Uncle Hyacynth (Mi tío Jacinto) – (Spain)

=== V ===
- Valley of Peace (Dolina miru) – (Yugoslavia)
- I Vampiri (The Vampire) – (Italy)

=== W ===
- War and Peace, directed by King Vidor, starring Audrey Hepburn, Henry Fonda, Mel Ferrer, Anita Ekberg
- Wakeful Eyes, directed by Ezz El-Dine Zulficar, starring Salah Zulfikar and Shadia – (Egypt)
- What a Woman!, starring Sophia Loren, Charles Boyer and Marcello Mastroianni – (Italy)
- While the City Sleeps, starring Dana Andrews, Ida Lupino, Rhonda Fleming, George Sanders, Vincent Price
- Who Done It?, starring Benny Hill – (GB)
- A Woman's Devotion, starring Ralph Meeker and Janice Rule
- Written on the Wind, directed by Douglas Sirk, starring Rock Hudson, Lauren Bacall, Robert Stack, Dorothy Malone
- The Wrong Man, directed by Alfred Hitchcock, starring Henry Fonda and Vera Miles

=== X ===
- X the Unknown, starring Dean Jagger and Leo McKern – (GB)

=== Y ===
- Yield to the Night, starring Diana Dors – (GB)
- You Can't Run Away from It, directed by Dick Powell, starring June Allyson and Jack Lemmon

=== Z ===
- Zarak, starring Victor Mature – (GB)

== Serials ==
- Blazing the Overland Trail, starring Lee Roberts and Dennis Moore
- Perils of the Wilderness

== Short film series ==
- Looney Tunes (1930–1969)
- Terrytoons (1930–1964)
- Merrie Melodies (1931–1969)
- Popeye (1933–1957)
- The Three Stooges (1934–1959)
- Bugs Bunny (1940–1964)
- Tom and Jerry (1940–1958)
- Droopy (1943–1958)
- Yosemite Sam (1945–1963)
- Speedy Gonzales (1953–1968)
- Woody Woodpecker (1940–1972)

Ending this year

- Donald Duck (1934-1956)
- Chip 'n' Dale (1943-1956)

== Births ==
- January 1 – Sheila McCarthy, Canadian actress and singer
- January 2 – John Bedford Lloyd, American character actor
- January 3 – Mel Gibson, American Irish actor and director
- January 4 – Ann Magnuson, American actress
- January 6 - Angus Deayton, English actor, writer, musician, comedian and broadcaster
- January 7 – David Caruso, American actor
- January 9
  - Kimberly Beck, American actress
  - Tim Kelleher, American writer, actor and director
  - Imelda Staunton, English actress
- January 11 - Phyllis Logan, Scottish actress
- January 13 – Janet Hubert, American actress
- January 20 – Bill Maher, American comedian, writer, producer, actor and television host
- January 21
  - Geena Davis, American actress
  - Robby Benson, American actor
- January 22 – Michael Kopsa, Canadian actor (d. 2022)
- January 24 – Peter Woodward, English actor, screenwriter and stuntman
- January 25
  - Dinah Manoff, American actress and director
  - Kevin O'Rourke, American actor
- January 27
  - Susan Blakeslee, American voice actress and musical theatre actress
  - Kevyn Major Howard, Canadian actor (d. 2025)
  - Mimi Rogers, American actress
- January 30 – Ann Dowd, American actress
- January 31 – John Lydon, English actor
- February 2 - Philip Franks, English actor and director
- February 3 – Nathan Lane, American actor
- February 12 – Arsenio Hall, American comedian, actor and talk show host
- February 13 – Jimmy Yuill, Scottish actor
- February 14 – Tom Burlinson, Canadian-Australian actor and singer
- February 15 – Olga Merediz, American actress and singer
- February 17 – Richard Karn, American actor
- February 19 – Kathleen Beller, American actress
- February 23 - Valentine Pelka, English actor
- February 26 – Jonathan Schmock, American actor, director, producer and writer
- February 27 – Angela Aames, American actress (d. 1988)
- February 28 – Lloyd Sherr, American voice actor
- March 1 – Tim Daly, American actor
- March 2 – Ángel Salazar, Cuban-American comedian and actor (d. 2024)
- March 5 – Adriana Barraza, Mexican actress
- March 7 – Bryan Cranston, American actor and director
- March 8 – John Kapelos, Canadian actor
- March 10 – Lesley Dunlop, English actress
- March 11 – Rob Paulsen, American voice actor
- March 12 – Lesley Manville, English Actress
- March 13 – Dana Delany, American actress
- March 16 – Clifton Powell, American actor
- March 25 – Matthew Garber, British actor and filmmaker (d. 1977)
- March 26 – Erika Kaljusaar, Estonian actress
- March 27 – Michael Harney, American actor
- March 30 – Paul Reiser, American comedian, actor and musician
- April 2 – Matt DeCaro, American actor (d. 2026)
- April 3 - John Laughlin, American actor
- April 8 – Jim Piddock, English actor, producer and writer
- April 12 – Andy García, Cuban-American actor
- April 17 – Vyto Ruginis, English actor and producer
- April 18 – Eric Roberts, American actor
- April 20 – Georgie Glen, Scottish actress
- April 22 – Bruce A. Young, American actor, writer and screenwriter
- April 27 – Kevin McNally, English actor and writer
- April 30 – Lars von Trier, Danish director
- May 3 - Ben Keaton, Irish actor (d. 2026)
- May 4 – Ralph Seymour, American actor
- May 5 – Lisa Eilbacher, American actress
- May 7 – S. Scott Bullock, American voice actor
- May 8 - Jeff Wincott, Canadian actor and martial artist
- May 9 – Wendy Crewson, Canadian actress
- May 10
  - Mickey Faerch, Danish-Canadian actress and dancer
  - Paige O'Hara, American actress, voice actress, singer and painter
  - Jonathan Roberts, American screenwriter, producer and author
- May 12
  - Christopher Good, English actor
  - Kimiko Yo, Japanese actress
- May 13
  - Fred Melamed, American actor, comedian and writer
  - Kirk Thornton, American voice actor, director and screenwriter
- May 17 – Bob Saget, American stand-up comedian, actor and television host (d. 2022)
- May 19 – Steven Ford, American actor
- May 24 - Hennie Bosman, South African stuntman and actor
- June 1 – Tom Irwin, American actor
- June 4 – Keith David, American actor
- June 5 – Roger Michell, British director (d. 2021)
- June 9 – Kelly Connell, American actor
- June 15
  - Ava Cadell, former actress, writer and producer
  - Robin Curtis, American actress
- June 18
  - Dominic Guard, English former actor
  - Marsha Garces Williams, American producer
- June 22 – Tim Russ, American actor, director, screenwriter and musician
- June 25
  - Chloe Webb, American actress
  - Bob West, American voice actor, singer and graphic designer
- June 27 – John Michael Bolger, American actor
- June 30 – David Alan Grier, American actor, singer and comedian
- July 1
  - Matthew Jacobs, British writer, director, producer and actor
  - Lorna Patterson, American retired actress
  - Alan Ruck, American actor
- July 2 – Jerry Hall, American actress and model
- July 9 – Tom Hanks, American actor and director
- July 10
  - Alok Nath, Indian former actor
  - Connie Ray, American actress
- July 11 – Sela Ward, American actress
- July 14 - Vladimir Kulich, Czech-Canadian actor
- July 16 – Tony Kushner, American author, playwright and screenwriter
- July 17 - Margot Rose, American actress and composer
- July 18 – Audrey Landers, American actress and singer
- July 19 – Peter Barton, American retired actor
- July 25 – Roger Clinton Jr., American actor and musician
- July 31
  - Michael Biehn, American actor
  - R. A. Mihailoff, American actor
- August 10 – Peter Robbins, American child actor (d. 2022)
- August 12 – Bruce Greenwood, Canadian actor
- August 15 - Jacek Koman, Polish actor and singer
- August 17 – Mahendra Perera, Sri Lankan actor
- August 19 – Adam Arkin, American actor and director
- August 20
  - Joan Allen, American actress
  - Simon Shepherd, English actor
- August 21 – Kim Cattrall, English-born Canadian actress
- August 23 – Skipp Sudduth, American actor
- August 24 – Kevin Dunn, American actor
- August 26 – Brett Cullen, American actor
- September 5 – Debbie Turner, American actress
- September 7 – Michael Beattie, Canadian-American actor
- September 11
  - Tony Gilroy, American filmmaker
  - Adriane Lenox, American actress
- September 16 – Jimmy Chisholm, Scottish actor
- September 17 – Susie Silvey, English actress, dancer and model
- September 18 – Tim McInnerny, English actor
- September 20
  - Gary Cole, American actor
  - Debbi Morgan, American actress
- September 26 – Linda Hamilton, American actress
- September 28 – Kiran Shah, Kenyan-Indian actor and stunt double
- September 29 – Stuart Charno, American actor
- October 2 – Charlie Adler, American voice actor and voice director
- October 3 – Hart Bochner, Canadian actor, director, screenwriter and producer
- October 4 – Christoph Waltz, Austrian-German actor
- October 10
  - Amanda Burton, Northern Irish actress
  - Fiona Fullerton, British actress and singer
- October 11 – Stephen Spinella, American actor
- October 13 - Jim Youngs, American actor
- October 14 – Bruce MacVittie, American actor (d. 2022)
- October 20 – Danny Boyle, English director and producer
- October 21 – Carrie Fisher, American actress (d. 2016)
- October 22 - Luis Guzmán, Puerto Rican character actor
- October 23 – Dwight Yoakam, American singer-songwriter, actor and filmmaker
- October 24 – Erich Anderson, American actor (d. 2024)
- October 26 – Rita Wilson, American actress and producer
- October 30 – Juliet Stevenson, English actress
- November 3 – Gary Ross, American director, writer and producer
- November 8 – Richard Curtis, New Zealand-born British director and screenwriter
- November 9 – Tyler Coppin, American-Australian actor
- November 10
  - Matt Craven, Canadian character actor
  - Sinbad, American stand-up comedian and actor
- November 13 – Rex Linn, American actor
- November 16 – Dan Shor, American actor, director and writer
- November 17 – Kelly Ward, American actor and voice director
- November 20 – Bo Derek, American actress and model
- November 21 – Cherry Jones, American actress
- November 22 – Richard Kind, American actor and voice actor
- November 24 – Ruben Santiago-Hudson, American actor and director
- November 26 – Don Lake, Canadian actor and writer
- November 27 – William Fichtner, American actor
- December 2 – Steven Bauer, Cuban-born American actor
- December 7 – Mark Rolston, American character actor
- December 8 – Michael C. Burgess, British actor
- December 10
  - John Lee Hancock, American filmmaker
  - Catherine Parks, American actress
- December 17
  - Peter Farrelly, American film director
  - Patrick Murray, British actor (d. 2025)
- December 18 – T. K. Carter, American actor (d. 2026)
- December 20 – Blanche Baker, American actress and filmmaker
- December 22 – Ray Lui, Hong Kong actor
- December 24 - Anil Kapoor Indian actor

== Deaths ==
- January 9 – Marion Leonard, 74, American early silent actress, The Prussian Spy, The Gibson Goddess
- January 12 – Norman Kerry, 61, American actor, The Phantom of the Opera, The Unknown
- January 19 – Charles Dingle, 68, American actor, Call Me Madam, State of the Union
- January 23 – Alexander Korda, 62, Hungarian film director, the founder of London Films, That Hamilton Woman, The Private Life of Henry VIII
- February 2
  - Bob Burns, 65, American actor, Waikiki Wedding, Belle of the Yukon
  - Charley Grapewin, 86, American actor, The Wizard of Oz, The Grapes of Wrath
- February 26 – Elsie Janis, 66, American actress and screenwriter, A Regular Girl, Women in War
- March 17 – Fred Allen, 61, American actor, It's in the Bag!, O. Henry's Full House
- March 24 – Jean Gehret, 56, Swiss actor and director, La Chienne, Madame Bovary
- March 25 – Robert Newton, 50, English actor, Oliver Twist, Odd Man Out
- April 4 – Lloyd Ingraham, 81, American actor and director, Scaramouche, West of the Rio Grande
- April 14 – Christian Rub, 70, Austrian actor, Father's Son, Something for the Birds
- April 15 – Kathleen Howard, 71, Canadian-American opera singer and actress, It's a Gift, Ball of Fire
- April 21 – Charles MacArthur, 60, American screenwriter and playwright, Wuthering Heights, His Girl Friday
- April 24 – Henry Stephenson, 85, British actor, Mutiny on the Bounty, Oliver Twist
- April 26 – Edward Arnold, 66, American actor, Mr. Smith Goes to Washington, Diamond Jim
- May 12 – Louis Calhern, 61, American actor, Duck Soup, Notorious, The Asphalt Jungle, High Society
- June 2 – Jean Hersholt, 69, Danish-American actor, Heidi
- June 6 – Margaret Wycherly, 74, English-American actress, White Heat, Sergeant York
- June 30 – Thorleif Lund, 76, Norwegian actor, Skibsrotten, Republikaneren
- July 8 – Mona Mårtenson, 54, Swedish actress, Pippi Longstocking, The Saga of Gosta Berling
- July 16 – Olof Winnerstrand, 80, Swedish actor, Torment, A Lesson in Love
- August 16 – Bela Lugosi, 73, Hungarian-born American actor, Dracula, White Zombie, The Black Cat
- August 23 – Kenji Mizoguchi, 58, Japanese director, The Life of Oharu, A Geisha
- October 2 – George Bancroft, 74, American actor, Stagecoach, Mr. Deeds Goes to Town
- October 9 – Marie Doro, 74, American actress, Oliver Twist, Sally Bishop
- October 17 – Anne Crawford, 35, British actress, Knights of the Round Table, Night Beat
- November 6 – Paul Kelly, 57, American actor, Juvenile Court, Adventure in Sahara
- November 10 – Victor Young, 56, American composer, Around the World in 80 Days, For Whom the Bell Tolls
- November 26 – Tommy Dorsey, 56, American musician, The Fabulous Dorseys, DuBarry Was a Lady, Ship Ahoy
- November 30 – Viggo Wiehe, 81, Danish actor, Doctor Nicholson and the Blue Diamond, Røverne fra Rold
- December 8 – Jack Cohn, 67, co-founder of Columbia Pictures
- December 12 – E. A. Dupont, 64, German writer, director, Jealousy, The Scarf
- December 26 – Holmes Herbert, 74, British actor, Dr. Jekyll and Mr. Hyde, The Invisible Man

== Film debuts ==
- Béatrice Altariba – Forgive Us Our Trespasses
- Karin Baal – Teenage Wolfpack
- Francine Bergé – Elena and Her Men
- Jean-Claude Brialy – Elena and Her Men
- Victor Brooks – The Iron Petticoat
- Frank Campanella – Somebody Up There Likes Me
- Roger Carel – Meeting in Paris
- Claude Chabrol – La Sonate à Kreutzer
- Werner Dissel – Die Millionen der Yvette
- Jacqueline Doyen – Le salaire du péché
- Andrew Duggan – Patterns
- Barbara Eden – Back from Eternity
- Barry Foster – The Baby and the Battleship
- James Garner – Toward the Unknown
- Frank Gorshin – The Proud and Profane
- Rance Howard – Frontier Woman
- Ron Howard – Frontier Woman
- Glenda Jackson – The Extra Day
- Dean Jones – Somebody Up There Likes Me
- David Kelly – The Wrong Man
- Alfredo Landa – Around the World in 80 Days
- Robert Loggia – Somebody Up There Likes Me
- Michael Lonsdale – It Happened in Aden
- Nan Martin – The Man in the Gray Flannel Suit
- Francis Matthews – Bhowani Junction
- Doug McClure – Friendly Persuasion
- Donald Moffat – The Battle of the River Plate
- Robert Morse – The Proud and Profane
- Armin Mueller-Stahl – Heimliche Ehen
- Don Murray – Bus Stop
- Leslie Nielsen – Ransom!
- Joan Plowright – Moby Dick
- Elvis Presley – Love Me Tender
- Amrish Puri – Bhai-Bhai
- Clive Revill – Reach for the Sky
- George C. Scott – Somebody Up There Likes Me
- Maggie Smith – Child in the House
- Harry Dean Stanton – The Wrong Man
- Robert Stephens – War and Peace
- Alexandra Stewart – Women's Club
- Rip Torn – Baby Doll
- Cicely Tyson – Carib Gold
- Robert Vaughn – The Ten Commandments
- John Vernon – 1984
- Eli Wallach – Baby Doll
- Tuesday Weld – Rock, Rock, Rock
- Jason Wingreen – Three Brave Men
- Salah Zulfikar – Wakeful Eyes
