= List of Soviet films of 1956 =

A list of films produced in the Soviet Union in 1956 (see 1956 in film).

== 1956 ==
Title	Russian title	Director	Cast	Genre	Notes
1956
Behind the Footlights	На подмостках сцены	Konstantin Yudin	Vasili Merkuryev	Drama	
Carnival Night	Карнавальная ночь	Eldar Ryazanov	Igor Ilyinsky, Lyudmila Gurchenko, Yuri Belov	Comedy	
A Crazy Day	Безумный день	Andrey Tutyshkin	Igor Ilyinsky	Comedy	
Different Fortunes	Разные судьбы	Leonid Lukov	Tatyana Piletskaya	Drama	
The Forty-First	Сорок первый	Grigori Chukhrai	Izolda Izvitskaya, Oleg Strizhenov, Nikolai Kryuchkov	War film, romance	
For the Power of the Soviets	За власть Советов	Boris Buneev	Aleksey Alekseev	Drama	
The Girl and the Crocodile	Девочка и крокодил	Iosif Gindin, Isaak Menaker	Elena Granovskaya	Comedy	
Honeymoon	Медовый месяц	Nadezhda Kosheverova	Lyudmila Kasatkina	Comedy	
Ilya Muromets	Илья Муромец	Aleksandr Ptushko	Boris Andreyev, Shukur Burkhanov, Andrei Abrikosov, Natalya Medvedeva	Fantasy	
The Immortal Garrison	Бессмертный гарнизон	Zakhar Agranenko, Eduard Tisse	Vasili Makarov, Vladimir Yemelyanov, Nikolai Kryuchkov, Anatoli Chemodurov	War film	
The Killers	Убийцы	Marika Beiku, Aleksandr Gordon, Andrei Tarkovsky	Yuli Fait, Aleksandr Gordon, Valentin Vinogradov, Boris Novikov, Yuri Dubrovin	Student film	
Magdana's Donkey	Лурджа Магданы	Rezo Chkheidze, Tengiz Abuladze	Dudukhana Tserodze	Drama	
Maxim Perepelitsa	Максим Перепелица	Anatoly Granik	Leonid Bykov, Lyudmila Kostyrko, Nikolai Yakovchenko, Aleksandr Borisov	Comedy	
Murder on Dante Street	Убийство на улице Данте	Mikhail Romm	Yevgeniya Kozyreva	Drama	
Old Khottabych	Старик Хоттабыч	Gennadiy Kazansky	Nikolai Volkov, Alexey Litvinov, Gennady Khudyakov	Fantasy	
Othello	Отелло	Sergei Yutkevich	Sergei Bondarchuk, Irina Skobtseva, Andrei Popov, Vladimir Soshalsky, Yevgeni Vesnik	Tragedy	Entered into the 1956 Cannes Film Festival
Other People's Relatives	Чужая родня	Mikhail Schweitzer	Nikolai Rybnikov, Nonna Mordyukova, Nikolai Sergeev, Alexandra Denisova	Drama	
The Poet	Поэт	Boris Barnet	Nikolay Kryuchkov	Drama	
The Rumyantsev Case	Дело Румянцева	Iosif Kheifits	Aleksey Batalov, Nikolai Kryuchkov, Yevgeny Leonov	Drama, Crime	
Sasha Enters Life	Тугой узел	Mikhail Schweitzer	Oleg Tabakov	Drama	
Soldiers	Солдаты	Aleksandr Ivanov	Vsevolod Safonov	Drama	
Spring on Zarechnaya Street	Весна на Заречной улице	Felix Mironer, Marlen Khutsiev	Nina Ivanova, Nikolai Rybnikov	Romantic drama	
They Were the First	Они были первыми	Yuri Egorov	Georgi Yumatov, Mark Bernes, Mikhail Ulyanov	War	
The Twelve Months	Двенадцать месяцев	Ivan Ivanov-Vano		Animation	
Trista let tomu...	Триста лет тому…	Vladimir Petrov	Sergey Dvoretskiy, Vasiliy Lanovoy, Natalya Uzhviy	Historical drama film	
A Weary Road	Долгий путь	Leonid Gaidai and Valentin Nevzorov	Sergei Yakovlev	Drama	
The White Poodle	Белый пудель	Marianna Roshal, Vladimir Shredel	Georgy Millyar, Mikhail Gluzsky	Drama	

== See also ==
- 1956 in the Soviet Union
