= List of Japanese films of 1956 =

A list of films released in Japan in 1956 (see 1956 in film).

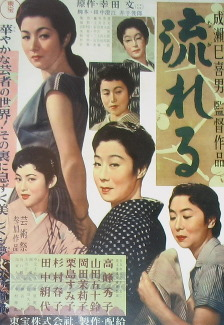
Nagareru

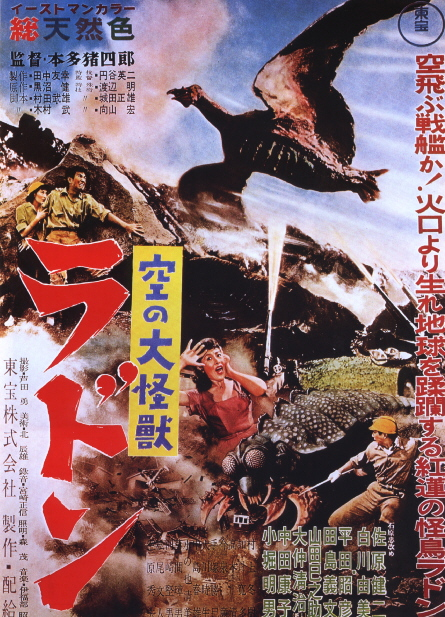
Rodan

| Title | Director | Cast | Genre | Notes |
|---|---|---|---|---|
1956
| Arashi | Hiroshi Inagaki | Chishū Ryū, Kinuyo Tanaka | Drama | Entered into the 7th Berlin International Film Festival |
| The Burmese Harp | Kon Ichikawa | Rentarō Mikuni, Shoji Yasui | War | |
| Crazed Fruit | Kō Nakahira | Masahiko Tsugawa, Yujiro Ishihara | Drama | |
| Crossroads of Death | Umetsugu Inoue | Rentarō Mikuni, Michiyo Aratama, Hisano Yamaoka, Izumi Ashikawa | Crime | |
| Christ in Bronze | Minoru Shibuya | Eiji Okada, Osamu Takizawa | Drama | Entered into the 1956 Cannes Film Festival |
| Dandy Sashichi Detective Story: Six Famous Beauties | Nobuo Nakagawa | Tomisaburô Wakayama, Keiko Hibino, Misako Uji, Kodayû Ichikawa, Shigeru Amachi | Crime | |
| Early Spring | Yasujirō Ozu | Haruko Sugimura, Ryō Ikebe | Drama | |
| Era of Victory or Defeat | Kyôtarô Namiki | Junko Ikeuchi, Yoichi Numata, Tetsurō Tamba, Ken Utsui | Crime | |
| Ghost-Cat of Gojusan-Tsugi | Bin Kado | Shintaro Katsu | Horror | |
| Godzilla, King of the Monsters! | Ishirō Honda | Raymond Burr, Takashi Shimura | Science-fiction | Japanese-American co-production |
| King of the Harbor | Seiichirô Uchikawa | Ken Utsui, Naoko Kubo, Shôji Nakayama, Takashi Wada, Utako Mitsuya, Maeda Maeda, Tetsurô Tanba | Crime | |
| King of Violence | Seiichirô Uchikawa | Naoko Kubo, Utako Mitsuya, Shôji Nakayama, Tetsurô Tanba, Ken Utsui | Crime | |
| The Legend of the White Serpent | Shirō Toyoda | Ryō Ikebe, Shirley Yamaguchi | | Entered into the 6th Berlin International Film Festival |
| Mahiru no ankoku | Tadashi Imai | | | Won Best Film at the 7th Blue Ribbon Awards and at the 11th Mainichi Film Awards |
| Migratory Birds of the Flowers | Katsuhiko Tasaka | | | |
| Nagareru | Mikio Naruse | Isuzu Yamada, Kinuyo Tanaka | Drama | |
| Punishment Room | Kon Ichikawa | Hiroshi Kawaguchi, Keizô Kawasaki, Seiji Miyaguchi, Ayako Wakao | Crime | |
| Revenge of the Pearl Queen | Toshio Shimura | Michiko Maeda, Ken Utsui | Crime | |
| Rodan | Ishirō Honda | Yumi Shirakawa | Science fiction | |
| Samurai III: Duel At Ganryu Island | Hiroshi Inagaki | Toshiro Mifune, Kōji Tsuruta | | |
| Shuu | Mikio Naruse | Setsuko Hara, Kyōko Kagawa | Drama | |
| Sisters of the Gion | Hiromasa Nomura | Michiyo Kogure, Tamao Nakamura | Drama | |
| Street of Shame | Kenji Mizoguchi | Machiko Kyō, Ayako Wakao | Drama | |
| Victory Is Mine | Seijun Suzuki | Kou Mishima, Ichirō Sugai | Action | |
| Warning from Space | Koji Shima | Toyomi Karita | Science fiction | |
| Where's Paradise? | Shûe Matsubayashi | Isao Kimura, Keiko Tsushima, Yoichi Numata, Chisako Hara, Yoshi Katô | Crime | |
| Marason zamurai | | | | |
| Tsukigata Hanpeita | Teinosuke Kinugasa | | | |
| A Wife's Heart | Mikio Naruse | Toshiro Mifune, Hideko Takamine | Drama | |
| The Renyasai Yagyu Hidden Story | Katsuhiko Tasaka | Raizo Ichikawa, Shintaro Katsu | Drama | |

== See also ==
- 1956 in Japan
