= List of Spanish films of 1956 =

A list of films produced in Spain in 1956 (see 1956 in film).

== 1956 ==
Title	Director	Cast	Genre	Notes
1956
The Adventures of Gil Blas	Ricardo Muñoz Suay	Georges Marchal, Barbara Laage, Susana Canales	Adventure	Co-production with France
Afternoon of the Bulls	Ladislao Vajda	Domingo Ortega, María Asquerino, Manolo Morán	Drama	Entered into the 1956 Cannes Film Festival
Andalusia Express	Francisco Rovira Beleta	Jorge Mistral, Marisa de Leza, Mara Berni	Film Noir	Co-production with Italy
Between Time and Eternity	Arthur Maria Rabenalt	Lilli Palmer, Willy Birgel, Carlos Thompson	Drama	Co-production with West Germany
Calabuch	Luis García Berlanga	Edmund Gwenn, Franco Fabrizi, Valentina Cortese, Manuel Alexandre	Comedy	Co-production with Italy. Venice Film Festival award
Calle mayor	Juan Antonio Bardem	Betsy Blair, José Suárez, Manuel Alexandre	Drama	Venice Film Festival award
Curra Veleta	Ramón Torrado	Paquita Rico, Gérard Tichy, Félix Fernández	Musical	
Uncle Hyacynth	Ladislao Vajda	Pablito Calvo, Antonio Vico	Drama	Entered into the 6th Berlin International Film Festival
