= Jack Howarth (actor) =

English actor (1896–1984)

Jack Howarth MBE
- Jack Howarth as Albert Tatlock in Coronation Street
- Born: John Aubrey Conway Howarth; 19 February 1896; Rochdale, Lancashire, England
- Died: 31 March 1984 (aged 88); Llandudno, Clwyd, Wales
- Resting place: Ashes buried in Colwyn Bay
- Occupation: Actor
- Years active: 1907–1984
- Spouse: Sarah Murgatroyd (m. 1929)
- Children: 1

John Aubrey Conway Howarth (19 February 1896 – 31 March 1984) was an English actor primarily known to television audiences, though he also worked across stage, radio and film.

He was best known for his role in his later years as grumpy but likeable elderly pensioner and Great War veteran Albert Tatlock in the TV series Coronation Street. As an original cast member he appeared in the series from its inception in late 1960 until his death in 1984, aged 88. Producer Mervyn Watson stated that Howarth was at that time most likely the oldest working actor in England.

== Early life ==
John Aubrey Conway Howarth was born at 96 Mitchell Street, Rochdale, Lancashire (now Greater Manchester) on 19 February 1896, the son of comedian Bert Howarth and his wife Amelia Mary (née Townsend). He had two brothers, Sydney and Sam, and three sisters, Ella, Elsie and Mary Louisa. Howarth went to school with the singer and actress Gracie Fields. As a child, he sold theatre programmes at the Theatre Royal, Rochdale.

== Career ==
=== Theatre ===
Howarth made his theatre debut in 1908 at the age of twelve playing juvenile roles on stage alongside his father. He joined the Lancashire Fusiliers in 1915 and served in France and Belgium in the First World War, after which he found work running a small cinema.

== Career ==
=== Theatre ===
Howarth's first theatre appearance was in Bram Stokers Dracula in 1924, in a company run by Hamilton Dean.

From 1935 he ran his own theatre company in Colwyn Bay, taking most of the male roles himself, due to the lack of men available to play the parts. He also toured the country in productions when he met his wife, Betty.

=== Television, radio and film ===
In 1947 Howarth became one of the first television performers at Alexandra Palace. He recalled, "I once played Humpty Dumpty when the director decided I had to wear a costume like a big egg, with little arms and legs. It was very hot and uncomfortable and when I got to the Jabberwocky poem I dried up, but kept talking. When we did the repeat later, I dried up at exactly the same place."

Howarth also appeared in a number of films including The Man in the White Suit (1951) and Hobson's Choice (1954), and many television programmes. For 14 years Howarth appeared in the role of Mr Maggs in the radio serial Mrs Dale's Diary.

Howarth made his Coronation Street debut in the first episode on 9 December 1960 and appeared in over 1,700 episodes until his final appearance on 25 January 1984, which was recorded in December 1983.

He was listed in The Guinness Book of Records under the category "Most Durable Performers" for being an actor on stage and television for 76 years from 1908 until his last appearance as Albert Tatlock in 1984. Reflecting on his role as Albert, Howarth said he would never have joined the cast of Coronation Street had he known it would run so long. However, when he was awarded the MBE in 1983, he stated that he had no intention of leaving the series, and he remained with the show until his death aged 88. Producer Mervyn Watson stated he was most likely at that time the oldest working actor in England.

== Personal life ==
Howarth married Sarah E. "Betty" Murgatroyd at St Mary and St Peter Parish Church, Hull, East Riding of Yorkshire, on Thursday, 25 July 1929. The couple were married for almost 55 years until Howarth's death, and had a son, John Murgatroyd Howarth, in Rochdale, in 1930. It was reported that Howarth bought his wife so much jewellery that she had to keep it in the bank.

Howarth lived at Croylands, Overlea Avenue, Deganwy, North Wales, with his wife. The couple had a flat in London and a suite at the Midland Hotel in Manchester, which he used while he was filming Coronation Street. His interests included travel and paintings along with cricket and circuses.

== Death ==
Jack Howarth died in Llandudno General Hospital from kidney failure and pneumonia, with his wife and son at his bedside, on Saturday, 31 March 1984. He was cremated six days later at a private funeral in Colwyn Bay, conducted by the vicar of Llanrhos, the Reverend David Jenkins. The address was given by comedian Wyn Calvin, chairman of the Welsh Committee of the Variety Club of Great Britain. There was one hymn, "Abide with Me", and Calvin spoke on behalf of the Stars Organisation and the Grand Order of Water Rats. He left his wife £60,000 in his will.

Prior to his death, Howarth had a lengthy absence from filming Coronation Street, explained by a storyline of Albert visiting his daughter. There was press speculation in several newspapers that Howarth was due to leave Coronation Street and his contract would not be renewed in November 1984. However, these were disputed by Granada, stating that he was due to return to filming at the end of April 1984. His wife was reported as saying just over a month before his death "Jack has no intention of resigning. He will be in Coronation Street for as long as Granada want him."

His death meant that William Roache, who played Albert Tatlock's nephew-in-law, Ken Barlow, was the only original actor left on Coronation Street at that time. The decision to kill off the Albert Tatlock character was made shortly after Howarth's death, and Albert's death was covered in the episode dated 14 May 1984.

A memorial service was held on 19 June 1984, at St Paul's Church, Covent Garden, attended by Leslie Crowther, Dickie Henderson, Geoff Love and David Jacobs.

Howarth's son died on 4 January 2016, aged 85.

== Filmography ==
| Year | Title | Role | Notes |
|---|---|---|---|
| 1946 | Jeannie | Porter | TV movie |
| 1947 | Mine Own Executioner | Party Guest | Uncredited |
| 1948 | The Men from the Ministry | | TV movie |
| 1949 | Alice's Adventure's in Wonderland and Through the Looking Glass | Humpty Dumpty | TV movie |
| 1949 | Under the Counter | Br Burrouughs | TV movie |
| 1949 | The Bear and the Barrier Pigeon | Luka | TV Short |
| 1949 | When We Are Married | Alderman Joseph Helliwell | TV movie |
| 1949 | The Cure for Love | Hunter | |
| 1950 | The Magnet | Auction bidder | Uncredited |
| 1950–1956 | BBC Sunday Night Theatre | Timothy "Tubby" Wadlow / Mr Bullamy / Cast member 'The Island of Cipango' / Harry Wall / Amos Entwhistle / Ted Munter / Joe Robinson / Sam Ramsdale | 8 episodes |
| 1951 | The Man in the White Suit | Receptionist at Corland Mill | |
| 1951 | A Legend in China | On the Plate: Second Servant | TV movie |
| 1952 | Francis and Juniper | Merchant | TV Short |
| 1952 | Exercise Hush | Ted, the postman | TV movie |
| 1952 | The Secret Garden | Pedler | Episode: "The Door in the Wall" |
| 1952 | Scotland Yard Inspector | Minor role | Uncredited |
| 1952 | The Pickwick Papers | Stout Cricketer | Episode: "The Second Paper" |
| 1953 | The Great Game | Minor role | Uncredited |
| 1953 | The Shadow Man | Landlord | Uncredited |
| 1953 | Stand by to Shoot | Tug Wilson | Episode: "Falling Star" |
| 1953 | The Persian Kitten | Mr Clay | TV movie |
| 1954 | Hobson's Choice | Tubby Wadlow | |
| 1954 | What Every Woman Wants | Pub Customer | |
| 1955 | The Prince and the Pauper | Constable | Episode: "Hendon Hall" |
| 1955 | Postmark for Danger | Hotel Porter | Uncredited |
| 1956 | My Sister and I | Grandfather | 6 episodes |
| 1956 | Vanity Fair | Waiter at Vauchhall Gardens | 1 episode |
| 1957 | Nathanial Titlark | Croom – Garage owner | Episode: "O Woodman, Spare That Tree" |
| 1957 | Final at Fernell | Joe Trubshaw | TV Short |
| 1957 | The Mail Van Murder Scotland Yard (film series) | Cleaner | Short, Uncredited |
| 1957 | Professor Tim | Villager | |
| 1957–1958 | Be Soon | | 3 episodes |
| 1958 | Champion Road | Mr Briggs | 2 episodes |
| 1959 | ITV Play of the Week | Mr Fowle | Episode: "The Younger Generation" |
| 1959 | The Artful Dodger | | Episode: "Going, Going, Gone!" |
| 1959 | The Man From Room 5143 | Publican | Episode: "The Man Who Made Keys: Part 1" |
| 1959 | Glencannon | Mr. Tooth | Episode: "Pearl of Panama" |
| 1960 | Probation Officer | Mr Boyd | 1 episode |
| 1960 | Yorky | Mr Sellby | Episode: "What's in a Name?" |
| 1960 | Emergency - Ward 10 | Bertie Wallsaw | 1 episode |
| 1960 | BBC Sunday-Night Play | Harry | Episode: "Pay Day" |
| 1960 | Knight Errand Limited | Bootle | Episode: "The Conspirators" |
| 1960 | The Balloon and the Barron | Mr Brown | TV movie |
| 1961 | Armchair Theatre | Uncle Fred | Episode: "Honeymoon Postponed" |
| 1969 | All-Star Comedy Carnival | Albert Tatlock | TV movie |
| 1970 | Spring and Port Wine | 2nd bowler | |
| 1974 | This Is Your Life (British TV series) | Himself | Broadcast in November |

== Permanent role ==
| Year | Title | Role | Notes |
| 1960–1984 | Coronation Street | Albert Tatlock | 1304 episodes, (final appearance) |

== Charity work and honours ==
Howarth was the subject of This Is Your Life in November 1974 when he was surprised by Eamonn Andrews on the set of Coronation Street. When Andrews said, "I'm taking you to London", Howarth replied "Oh no, you're not, you know." He was eventually persuaded to appear on the show, joined by the cast of Coronation Street, with tributes from stars including Bryan Mosley, Betty Driver, Eileen Derbyshire, Margot Bryant, Thora Hird and Arthur Lowe.

Howarth was made an MBE in January 1983 for his charity work, especially for supporting the disabled and children with general learning difficulties. He was national vice-president for Scope and left them £250 in his will. Howarth had raised more than £50,000 for the charity by collecting a donation each time he signed an autograph.
