= Fury at Smugglers' Bay =

1961 British film by John Gilling

- Directed by: John Gilling
- Written by: John Gilling
- Produced by: John Gilling
- Starring: Peter Cushing; Bernard Lee; Michèle Mercier; John Fraser
- Cinematography: Harry Waxman
- Edited by: John Victor-Smith
- Music by: Harold Geller
- Production company: John Gilling Enterprises
- Distributed by: Regal Films International (UK)
- Release date: March 1961 (UK)
- Running time: 92 mins
- Country: United Kingdom
- Language: English

Fury at Smugglers' Bay is a 1961 British adventure film produced, written and directed by John Gilling and starring Peter Cushing, Bernard Lee, Michèle Mercier and John Fraser. The plot revolves around smuggling in Cornwall.

== Plot ==
In 18th century Cornwall, Squire Trevenyan a magistrate to a sleepy fishing village, is blackmailed by a vicious smuggler, Black John, into keeping quiet about his murderous gang's shipwrecking racket. The squire's son, Chris, deepens the dilemma when he attempts to stand up for his honour, his father's and that of the girl he loves whose own father, a petty thief, has been sentenced to a penal colony at the insistence of Black John. The daughter engages the help of a local highwayman, an honourable thief who watches over those he has robbed to ensure their safe return home, to stop Black John once and for all.

== Cast ==
- Peter Cushing as Squire Trevenyan
- Bernard Lee as Black John
- Michèle Mercier as Louise Lejeune
- John Fraser as Christopher Trevenyan
- William Franklyn as the Captain
- George Coulouris as François Lejeune
- Liz Fraser as Betty
- June Thorburn as Jenny Trevenyan
- Katherine Kath as Maman
- Maitland Moss as Tom, the butler
- Tommy Duggan as Red Friars
- Juma as Juma
- Christopher Carlos as The Tiger, a pirate
- Miles Malleson as Duke of Avon
- Alan Browning as 2nd highwayman
- Bob Simmons as Carlos

== Production ==
Studio sequences were filmed at Twickenham Film Studios in west London with the external sequences representing the coast of Cornwall actually being shot at Abereiddy and Penparc farm on the north Pembrokeshire coast in south-west Wales.

Although filmed in colour, scenes of shipwrecks during a storm have been lifted from an earlier black-and-white film and have been tinted to match the other footage.

== Critical reception ==
Kinematograph Weekly said it "found a ready market."

The Monthly Film Bulletin wrote: "Untidily plotted but roistering variation on the Jamaica Inn theme, distinguished by attractive colour photography (Harry Waxman), one or two imaginative moments of direction (John Gilling), and a splendid sword fight in which the previously overglamorous hero (John Fraser) proves he is capable of better things than getting his tights wet spurring his horse through the breakers. Peter Cushing is a shade headmistressy as the lip-pursing squire, and William Franklyn an uncommonly sophisticated highwayman, but Bernard Lee provides ample compensation as the ruffianly, hirsute Black John"

In the Radio Times, David Parkinson gave the film three out of five stars, and noted, "as Cushing suggested in his memoirs, this 1790s adventure is tantamount to an English western, with a saloon brawl, sword-wielding showdowns and a last-minute rescue. However, the peripheral characters are more subtly shaded, with Miles Malleson's comic nobleman and George Coulouris's abused outsider being particularly well realised."
