= 1956 in the United Kingdom =

Events from the year 1956 in the United Kingdom. The year is dominated by the Suez Crisis.

== Incumbents ==
- Monarch – Elizabeth II
- Prime Minister – Anthony Eden (Conservative)

== Events ==
- 1 January – Possession of heroin becomes fully criminalised.
- 4 January – Eight months after winning the General Election and barely a year after becoming Prime Minister, Anthony Eden's position is looking under threat as opinion polls show Labour (now led by Hugh Gaitskell) are in the lead.
- 24 January – Plans are announced for the construction of thousands of new homes in the Barbican area of London, devastated by the Luftwaffe during the Second World War.
- 26 January–5 February – Great Britain and Northern Ireland compete at the Winter Olympics in Cortina d'Ampezzo, Italy, but do not win any medals.
- February
  - The Duke of Edinburgh's Award launched.
  - Release of Shirley Bassey's first single, "Burn My Candle (At Both Ends)".
- 5 February – First showing of documentary films by the Free Cinema movement, at the National Film Theatre, London.
- 8 February
  - The first AEC Routemaster bus in London starts public service, on route 2.
  - The Treaty of London (1956) is signed to set up an independent Federation of Malaya
- 11 February – Two of the "Cambridge spies", Guy Burgess and Donald Maclean, appear in Moscow after vanishing as diplomats in mysterious circumstances in 1951.
- 12 February – Double yellow lines to prohibit parking introduced in Slough.
- 17 February – The Midlands becomes the first region outside of London to receive ITV when ATV Midlands begins broadcasting; ABC, the weekend station, launches the following day.
- 23 February – A fire at Eastwood Mills, Keighley, West Yorkshire, kills eight employees.
- 9 March – Archbishop Makarios is deported from Cyprus to the Seychelles by the British authorities.
- 10 March – Fairey Aviation test pilot Peter Twiss sets a new airspeed record in the Fairey Delta 2, also becoming the first person to exceed 1,000 mph (1,610 km/h) in level flight. His top speed is 1,132 mph (1,821 km/h), 310 mph (499 km/h) in excess of the previous (US) record.
- 14 March – A memorial to Karl Marx is unveiled at the new site of his grave in Highgate Cemetery, London, by Harry Pollitt, General Secretary of the Communist Party of Great Britain.
- 24 March – In the Grand National, Devon Loch, owned by Queen Elizabeth The Queen Mother and ridden by Dick Francis, is in a clear lead when the horse inexplicably collapses fifty yards (46 m) from the finish, giving victory to E.S.B. at 100/7, ridden by Dave Dick and trained by Fred Rimell. Stan Mellor is the second placed jockey.
- 7 April – Manchester United, with an average team age of just 24, win the Football League First Division title.
- 17 April
  - In his Budget speech, Chancellor of the Exchequer Harold Macmillan announces the launch of Premium Bonds which will go on sale on 1 November, with a £1,000 prize available from the first draw in June next year.
  - Chew Valley Lake (1,200 acres (4.9 km^{2})) in Somerset is inaugurated as a reservoir for the Bristol area by the Queen.
- 19 April – Diver Lionel Crabb (working for MI6) dives into Portsmouth Harbour to investigate visiting Soviet cruiser Ordzhonikidze and vanishes during a state visit by Nikita Khrushchev and Nikolai Bulganin. On 9 May, Anthony Eden who had refused permission for the operation, makes a statement refusing to reveal any details surrounding the mystery of Crabb's disappearance.
- 20 April – Humphrey Lyttelton and his band record his trad jazz composition "Bad Penny Blues" in London with sound engineer Joe Meek. This will be the first British jazz record to get into the Top Twenty.
- 22 April – The 2i's Coffee Bar opens in Old Compton Street, Soho (London); its basement rapidly becomes a pioneering venue for rock and roll music in Britain.
- 27 April – Doubts about the future of Anthony Eden as Prime Minister continue as his personal ratings in opinion polls remain low.
- 3 May – Granada Television begins broadcasting with a base in Manchester, extending ITV's coverage to Northern England and later Yorkshire.
- 5 May – Manchester City F.C. win the FA Cup with a 3–1 win over Birmingham City at Wembley Stadium. German-born Manchester goalkeeper Bert Trautmann plays through the game despite an injury 15 minutes from time diagnosed on 9 May as a broken neck.
- 7 May – Minister of Health Robin Turton rejects a call for the government to lead an anti-smoking campaign, arguing that no ill-effects have yet been proven.
- 8 May – First performance of John Osborne's play Look Back in Anger by the newly formed English Stage Company at the Royal Court Theatre. Alan Bates has his first major role as Cliff. The theatre's press release describes the dramatist as among the angry young men of the time.
- 9 May – The Gower Peninsula of Wales becomes the first area in the British Isles to be designated an Area of Outstanding Natural Beauty.
- 1 June – Elsie Stephenson becomes founding Director of the Nurse Teaching Unit, University of Edinburgh, the first nurse teaching unit within a British university.
- 3 June
  - Third class accommodation on British Rail trains redesignated as second class (also applies on Great Northern Railway in Northern Ireland).
  - Prime Ministers Jawaharlal Nehru of India and Sidney Holland of New Zealand are made Freemen of the City of London.
- 4 July – The National Library of Scotland's first purpose-built premises are opened on George IV Bridge in Edinburgh.
- 5 July – Parliament passes the Clean Air Act in response to the Great Smog of 1952.
- 9 July – Mettoy introduce Corgi Toys model cars, manufactured in South Wales.
- 10 July – A private member's bill to abolish the death penalty is vetoed in the House of Lords; however, no capital punishment is carried out in the UK this year.
- 22 July – The first UK Albums Chart is published, in Record Mirror. Frank Sinatra's Songs for Swingin' Lovers! tops it for the first two weeks.
- 26 July – Egyptian leader Gamal Abdel Nasser announces the nationalisation of the Suez Canal triggering the Suez Crisis.
- 27 July – First Berni Inn steakhouse opens in Bristol.
- 31 July – Jim Laker sets a record by taking 19 wickets in a first class cricket match, at Old Trafford in the fourth Test between England and Australia.
- 9 August–9 September – Art exhibition This Is Tomorrow, featuring principally the interdisciplinary ICA Independent Group, at the Whitechapel Art Gallery, London. Among the exhibits is Richard Hamilton's collage Just What Is It that Makes Today's Homes So Different, So Appealing?, considered to be one of the earliest works of pop art.
- 17 August – Scotland Yard are called to Eastbourne to investigate the activities of society doctor John Bodkin Adams. The case is reported around the world and press reports claim up to 400 patients may have been murdered.
- 4 September – Opening of the first Welsh-medium secondary school Ysgol Glan Clwyd in Rhyl.
- 10 September – Guy Mollet visits London and proposes a merger of France and the United Kingdom. However, the idea is rejected by Anthony Eden.
- 12 September – Manchester United become the first English team to compete in the European Cup, a competition for the champions of domestic leagues across Europe, when they play the first leg of the preliminary round in Belgium and beat R.S.C. Anderlecht 2–0.
- 25 September – The TAT-1 transatlantic telephone cable between the UK and North America is inaugurated.
- 26 September – Manchester United qualify for the first round of the European Cup in style with a 10–0 win over R.S.C. Anderlecht at Maine Road in the second leg of the preliminary round.
- 28 September – Anthony Eden considers allowing France to join the Commonwealth of Nations, but this idea is also rejected.
- 11 October – Kite test: a Vickers Valiant jet bomber of No. 49 Squadron RAF piloted by Squadron Leader Ted Flavell drops the UK's first live air-dropped atomic bomb, a Blue Danube, over Maralinga, South Australia, as part of the 'Operation Buffalo' British nuclear tests at Maralinga by a team of Australian, British and Canadian scientists.
- 15 October – The RAF retires its last Lancaster bomber.
- 17 October – The Queen opens the world's first commercial nuclear power station at Calder Hall.
- 24 October – Protocol of Sèvres, a secret agreement between the UK, France and Israel allowing the latter to invade Sinai with the support of the two former governments. Anthony Eden subsequently denies existence of an agreement.
- 5 November
  - Jo Grimond replaces Clement Davies as leader of the Liberal Party.
  - The long-running television programme What the Papers Say airs for the first time on ITV.
- 6 November – British and French forces seize control of two major ports in the Suez Canal in Egypt before declaring a ceasefire.
- 9 November – At the Lord Mayor's Show in London, the first AEC Routemaster forms part of the procession, advertised as "London's Bus of the Future".
- 15 November – The Manchester Guardian calls for the resignation of Anthony Eden as Prime Minister, despite his improvement in opinion poll showings.
- 21 November – DIDO heavy water enriched uranium nuclear reactor opens at the Atomic Energy Research Establishment, Harwell, Oxfordshire.
- 22 November–8 December – Great Britain and Northern Ireland compete at the Olympics in Melbourne, Australia and wins 6 gold, 7 silver and 11 bronze medals.
- 29 November – Petrol rationing introduced because of petrol blockades from the Middle East due to the Suez Crisis.
- 10 December – Cyril Norman Hinshelwood wins the Nobel Prize in Chemistry jointly with Nikolay Semyonov "for their researches into the mechanism of chemical reactions".
- 12 December – The Irish Republican Army launches its Border Campaign in Northern Ireland with co-ordinated attacks on official premises.
- 19 December
  - Six people die and several more are injured in car crashes caused by heavy fog in Northern England.
  - Eastbourne GP Dr John Bodkin Adams is arrested for the murder of patient Edith Alice Morrell.
- 21 December – The Government of Northern Ireland under Basil Brooke uses the Special Powers Act to intern several hundred republican suspects without trial.
- 23 December – British and French troops withdraw from Suez under United Nations and United States pressure.
- 25 December – PG Tips launches its long-running ITV advertising campaign using a chimpanzees' tea party with voices provided by Peter Sellers.
- 31 December – The Flanders and Swann revue At the Drop of a Hat opens in London.

=== Undated ===
- Opening of the first Jewish seminary for Liberal and Reform Judaism in England, Leo Baeck College, as the Jewish Theological College of London at West London Synagogue; its first two students are Lionel Blue and Michael Leigh.
- The National Loaf is abolished, but bakers are obliged to fortify white bread.
- Tesco opens its first self-service stores in St Albans and Maldon.
- The Collared dove first breeds in the UK.
- Death of the last Agapemonite.

== Publications ==
- Sybille Bedford's semi-autobiographical novel A Legacy.
- Agatha Christie's Hercule Poirot novel Dead Man's Folly.
- Anthony Crosland's book The Future of Socialism.
- Gerald Durrell's memoir My Family and Other Animals.
- Ian Fleming's James Bond novel Diamonds Are Forever.
- William Golding's novel Pincher Martin.
- C. S. Lewis' novel The Last Battle.
- Rose Macaulay's novel The Towers of Trebizond.
- Nancy Mitford's book Noblesse Oblige: an Enquiry into the Identifiable Characteristics of the English Aristocracy, illustrated by Osbert Lancaster.
- The Movement's poetry anthology New Lines edited by Robert Conquest.
- Mary Renault's historical novel The Last of the Wine.
- Samuel Selvon's novel The Lonely Londoners.
- Dodie Smith's children's novel The Hundred and One Dalmatians.
- Angus Wilson's novel Anglo-Saxon Attitudes.
- Colin Wilson's study The Outsider.

== Births ==
- 2 January – Storm Constantine, science fiction and fantasy author (died 2021)
- 4 January – Bernard Sumner, guitarist (Joy Division and New Order)
- 6 January
  - Angus Deayton, actor and television presenter
  - Justin Welby, Archbishop of Canterbury
  - Clive Woodward, rugby union player and coach
- 7 January – Johnny Owen, né Owens, Welsh bantamweight boxer (died 1980)
- 9 January – Imelda Staunton, English actress
- 14 January – Ronan Bennett, Northern Irish writer
- 17 January – Paul Young, pop singer and guitarist
- 21 January – Ian McMillan, poet
- 29 January – Anton Otulakowski, footballer
- 31 January – John Lydon (Johnny Rotten), punk rock singer-songwriter (Sex Pistols)
- 1 February – Lucy Irvine, adventurer and author
- 2 February – Philip Franks, actor and director
- 4 February – Jon Walmsley, television actor and guitarist
- 8 February – Richard Sharp, banker and Chairman of the BBC
- 12 February – Joe Dever, fantasy author (died 2016)
- 13 February – Peter Hook, bass guitar player (Joy Division and New Order)
- 16 February – Paul Gilroy, academic
- 19 February – Dave Wakeling, rock singer-songwriter
- 22 February – Stuart Peach, Air Chief Marshal
- 24 February – Fiona Graham-Mackay, née Bain, portrait painter
- 25 February – Davie Cooper, Scottish footballer (died 1995)
- 28 February – Terry Leahy, businessman
- 7 March – Andrea Levy, novelist (died 2019)
- 8 March – Lesley Regan, gynaecologist
- 11 March – Helen Rollason, television sports presenter (died 1999)
- 12 March
  - Steve Harris, bass guitar player, founding member of Iron Maiden
  - Lesley Manville, actress
- 17 March – Frank McGarvey, footballer (died 2023)
- 20 March – Catherine Ashton, Baroness Ashton of Upholland, politician
- 23 March
  - Rosa Beddington, biologist (died 2001)
  - Andrew Mitchell, soldier and politician, Secretary of State for International Development
  - Jeremy Wade, biologist and author
- 9 April – Nigel Slater, food writer
- 10 April – Carol Robinson, chemist
- 19 April
  - Sue Barker, tennis player and television presenter
  - Anne Glover, Scottish biologist
- 25 April – Greg Richards, decathlete
- 26 April – Koo Stark, actress
- 7 May – Nicholas Hytner, theatre director
- 13 May – Richard Madeley, television presenter
- 14 May – Hazel Blears, politician
- 15 May – Kjartan Poskitt, author
- 18 May – John Godber, dramatist
- 24 May – Joe Casely-Hayford, fashion designer (died 2019)
- 26 May
  - Neil Parish, politician
  - Fiona Shackleton, lawyer
- 6 June – Christopher Adamson, film actor
- 20 June – Simon Bryant, air marshal
- 5 July – Terry Chimes, rock drummer (The Clash)
- 14 July – Cornelia Parker, visual artist
- 15 July – Ian Curtis, post-punk singer-songwriter (Joy Division) (died 1980)
- 16 July – Anthony Julius, solicitor advocate
- 19 July – Nikki Sudden, guitarist and singer-songwriter (Swell Maps) (died 2006)
- 25 July – Andy Goldsworthy, sculptor and photographer
- 28 July – Robert Swan, polar explorer
- 29 July – Viv Anderson, footballer
- 8 August – Chris Foreman, rock guitarist
- 14 August – Jonathan Powell, civil servant and diplomat
- 17 August – Dave Jones, footballer and manager
- 19 August – Louise Gold, puppeteer, actress and singer
- 21 August – Kim Cattrall, screen actress
- 2 September – Angelo Fusco, Provisional IRA member
- 7 September – Robert Reed, Baron Reed of Allermuir, Scottish judge, President of the Supreme Court of the UK
- 14 September – Ray Wilkins, footballer and coach (died 2018)
- 15 September – Ross J. Anderson, computer security expert (died 2024)
- 18 September – Tim McInnerny, actor
- 20 September – John Harle, saxophonist
- 29 September – Sebastian Coe, athlete, co-ordinator of London 2012 Olympic Games
- 1 October – Theresa May, Prime Minister, Conservative Party leader, MP for Maidenhead
- 10 October – David Hempleman-Adams, adventurer
- 20 October – Danny Boyle, film director
- 27 October – Hazell Dean, singer
- 29 October – Mina Smallman, Anglican priest
- 30 October – Juliet Stevenson, actress
- November – Teresa Borsuk, architect
- 5 November – Rob Fisher, keyboardist and songwriter (Climie Fisher) (died 1999)
- 8 November – Richard Curtis, screenwriter
- 23 November – Jimmy Hibbert, comedian and scriptwriter
- 26 November – John McCarthy, journalist and hostage
- 28 November – Lucy Gutteridge, film actress
- 7 December – Anna Soubry, politician
- 8 December – Michael C. Burgess, actor and editor
- 15 December – William Orbit, musician and record producer (died 2026)
- 17 December – Patrick Murray, actor (died 2025)
- 18 December – Tommy Walsh, television personality and builder (died 2026)
- 19 December – Jimmy Cauty, electronic musician (The KLF), graphic and performance artist
- 23 December
  - Dave Murray, guitarist (Iron Maiden)
  - Simon Wessely, psychiatrist
- 24 December – Ralph Moore, jazz saxophonist
- 26 December – Simon Fanshawe, writer and broadcaster
- 28 December – Nigel Kennedy, violinist
- 29 December – Fred MacAulay, Scottish comedian

== Deaths ==
- 4 January – R. Williams Parry, Welsh poet (born 1884)
- 13 January – Wickham Steed, journalist, editor and historian (born 1871)
- 14 January – Sheila Kaye-Smith, novelist (born 1887)
- 31 January – A. A. Milne, author (born 1882)
- 10 February – Hugh Trenchard, 1st Viscount Trenchard, marshal of the Royal Air Force (born 1873)
- 25 March – Robert Newton, film actor (born 1905)
- 30 March – Edmund Clerihew Bentley, writer (born 1875)
- 24 April – Henry Stephenson, character actor (born 1871)
- 29 April – Harold Bride, Titanic survivor (born 1890)
- 2 May – Violet Gibson, Irish-born attempted assassin (born 1876)
- 3 May
  - Rodney Collin, writer (born 1909)
  - Peter Watson, art collector and benefactor (born 1908)
- 17 May – Austin Osman Spare, magician (born 1886)
- 18 May – Maurice Tate, cricketer (born 1895)
- 20 May – Max Beerbohm, theatre critic (born 1872)
- 24 May – Martha Annie Whiteley, chemist and mathematician (born 1866)
- 6 June – Margaret Wycherly, actress (born 1881)
- 11 June – Frank Brangwyn, artist (born 1867)
- 22 June – Walter de la Mare, poet and fiction writer (born 1873)
- 28 June – Claud Schuster, 1st Baron Schuster, civil servant (born 1869)
- 11 July – Dorothy Wellesley, Duchess of Wellington, socialite, author, poet and literary editor (born 1889)
- 5 August – J. M. Andrews, second Prime Minister of Northern Ireland (born 1871)
- 19 August – Bernard Griffin, Cardinal of the Roman Catholic Church; Archbishop of Westminster from 1943 until his death (born 1873)
- 6 September – Michael Ventris, co-decipherer of Linear B (car accident) (born 1922)
- 7 September – C. B. Fry, cricketer (born 1872)
- 21 September – Jack de Leon, Panamanian-born theatre manager, impresario and playwright (heart attack) (born 1902)
- 22 September – Frederick Soddy, chemist, Nobel Prize laureate (born 1877)
- 16 October – Jack Southworth, footballer (born 1866)
- 17 October – Anne Crawford, film actress (leukaemia) (born 1920)
- 22 October – Hannah Mitchell, socialist and suffragette (born 1872)
- 19 November – Francis L. Sullivan, actor (born 1903)
- 24 November – Sir Lionel Whitby, haematologist, clinical pathologist, pharmacologist and army officer (born 1895)
- 6 December – Helen Duncan, Scottish medium (born 1897)
- 9 December – Charles Joughin, Titanic survivor (born 1878)
- 13 December
  - Sir Arthur Grimble, colonial civil servant and travel writer (born 1888)
  - Anthony Moorhouse, soldier (murdered in Egypt) (born 1935)
- 16 December – Nina Hamnett, artist (born 1890)

== See also ==
- 1956 in British music
- 1956 in British television
- List of British films of 1956
