= Abigail and Roger =

- Genre: Sitcom
- Starring: Julie Webb; David Drummond; Rosina Enright; John Stone; Grace Denbigh-Russell
- Country of origin: United Kingdom
- No. of series: 1
- No. of episodes: 9

Production
- Running time: 20 minutes

Original release
- Network: BBC Television Service
- Release: 4 July – 29 August 1956

Abigail and Roger is a British television sitcom that aired on the BBC Television Service in 1956. It was written by Kelvin Sheldon. Julie Webb and David Drummond play Abigail and Roger, an engaged couple living in London bedsits. The series is thought to no longer exist.

== Cast ==
- Julie Webb as Abigail
- David Drummond as Roger
- Rosina Enright as Shirl
- John Stone as Clive
- Grace Denbigh-Russell as Mrs Moloch

== Plot ==
Abigail and Roger are an engaged couple living separately in bedsits in London. Abigail is a shorthand typist, who is outspoken and very capable domestically, she can mend a fuse, cook, drive and so on. Roger works in the City and is into keeping fit and planning for their future. Much of the humour arose from the different attitudes to life, and their interest in the attractions of London.

== Episodes ==
The show was originally meant to run for thirteen weeks, as a summer replacement for the soap opera The Grove Family, but in fact only ran for nine weeks. The entire series is thought to be lost.

Episode No.	Original Broadcast Date
1	4 July 1956
2	11 July 1956
3	18 July 1956
4	25 July 1956
5	1 August 1956
6	8 August 1956
7	15 August 1956
8	22 August 1956
9	29 August 1956
