= My Sister and I (TV series) =

1956 British TV sitcom

My Sister and I is a British television series which aired in 1956. It was a sitcom produced by ABC Weekend TV at its Didsbury Studios in Manchester, and broadcast on ITV. The series was wiped, and none of the six episodes produced are known to still exist. Little information is available on the series.

== Cast ==
- Dinah Lee as Sally
- Jane Taylor as Jo
- Jack Howarth as Grandfather
- Ethel Manners as Mrs. Balshaw
