= Tales from Soho =

1956 British TV series

Tales from Soho was a British television series which aired in 1956 on the BBC. Only a single episode is known to remain in the archives.

== Episode list ==
- The Fiddle (21 January 1956) (extant)
- The Message (28 January 1956)
- Slippy Fives (4 February 1956)
- The Protectors (11 February 1956)
- The Ladder (18 February 1956)
- Set a Thief (25 February 1956)
