= Juma (actor) =

Zanzibar-born child actor (1943–1989)

Jumas Omar
- Born: 10 October 1943; Zanzibar
- Died: May 1989 (aged 45–46)
- Occupation: Actor
- Years active: 1943-1989

Jumas Omar (born Jumas Omar, 10 October 1943 – May 1989 in London) was a Zanzibar-born actor who appeared in several British films set in Africa as a child actor.

== Filmography ==
- West of Zanzibar (1954)
- Safari (1955)
- Odongo (1956)
- Fury at Smugglers' Bay (1961)
