= Doublecross (1956 film) =

1956 British film by Anthony Squire

- Opening title
- Directed by: Anthony Squire
- Screenplay by: Anthony Squire; Kem Bennett
- Based on: story "Queer Fish" by Kem Bennett
- Starring: Donald Houston; Fay Compton
- Cinematography: Kenneth Talbot
- Edited by: Peter Hunt
- Music by: Edward Williams; Marcus Dods (music director)
- Production company: Group 3 Films
- Distributed by: British Lion Films (UK)
- Release date: February 1956 (UK)
- Country: UK
- Language: English

Doublecross (also known as Queer Fish) is a 1956 second feature British crime film directed by Anthony Squire and starring Donald Houston, Fay Compton and William Hartnell. The screenplay was by Squire and Kem Bennett based on the latter's 1955 story "The Queer Fish".

== Plot ==
The story takes place in a Cornish fishing town in the 1950s.

Local fisherman assemble in a local pub, apparently to practise their bell-ringing. They are approached by two foreign men (and one woman) who are interested in making use of a boat and ask questions about going to the French coast.

Albert Pascoe agrees to take them to France for £100, half paid in advance. They sail off on a moonlit night on a trip that will take until the next afternoon.

Meanwhile, back in the village, Albert's smaller rowing boat is found with four large poached salmon in it. A friend hides them from the authorities.

Police get involved when it is revealed that one of the foreign men is a murderer.

Albert overhears the two foreign men and woman (wife of one of the men) discussing that one of the men Dmitri Krassin had to kill a man in England while stealing UK state secrets. After this, Albert decides to double-cross the three, tricking them by altering the boat's compass and landing them back somewhere on the coast of England, which he knows resembles the coast of France.

In mid-channel the foreign men plot to kill Albert after he drops them in France. He is forewarned of this by the woman Anna and attacks them as soon as they land, trying to wrestle a gun from Krassin. He spits in Clifford's face. Anna has not left the boat and when he returns to the boat they set off to sea again. Anna discusses her home country of Hungary where her father fished on Lake Balaton, and Anna and Albert begin to fall in love.

When quizzed by the police, Albert reveals that he dropped the spies at Lands End, England, knowing that they could not get off the beach and had no idea that it was not France, and defends Anna as being completely innocent.

The police refuse to charge Albert with illegally catching a salmon just as he returned to the harbour. Albert and Anna decide to try to live together as a couple.

== Cast ==
- Donald Houston as Albert Pascoe
- Fay Compton as Alice Pascoe
- Anton Diffring as Dmitri Krassin a spy
- Allan Cuthbertson as Clifford, a spy
- Delphi Lawrence as Anna Krassin
- William Hartnell as Herbert Whiteway, the landowner
- Kenneth Cope as Jeffrey of the Coast Guard (his first credited role in a film)
- Colin Douglas as police sergeant
- Robert Shaw as Ernest, police constable
- Frank Lawton as Chief Constable
- Harry Towb as the pub landlord

== Critical reception ==
The Monthly Film Bulletin wrote: "Fay Compton gives a vigorous but wasted performance in this, indifferently directed adventure story. There are some good comedy moments, notably when Albert's friends sneak his poached salmon away from the Fisheries officer; on the whole, though, the film descends to the level of trite melodrama, only partly redeemed by its natural settings."

Picture Show wrote: "There is plenty of excitement with touches of humour."

Picturegoer wrote: "Cracks at local bigwigs and busybodies lace the action, but the catch of laughs and thrills is incredibly small."

The Radio Times Guide to Films gave the film 2/5 stars, writing: "This benefits from its Cornish locations and director Anthony Squire's tight use of the cramped conditions on board a fishing boat. Otherwise, it's B-business as usual, as salmon poacher Donald Houston realises mysterious passengers Anton Diffring and Delphi Lawrence have tricked him into ferrying Cold War secrets."
