= Symphony No. 8 (Vaughan Williams) =

Symphony in four movements composed by Ralph Vaughan Williams

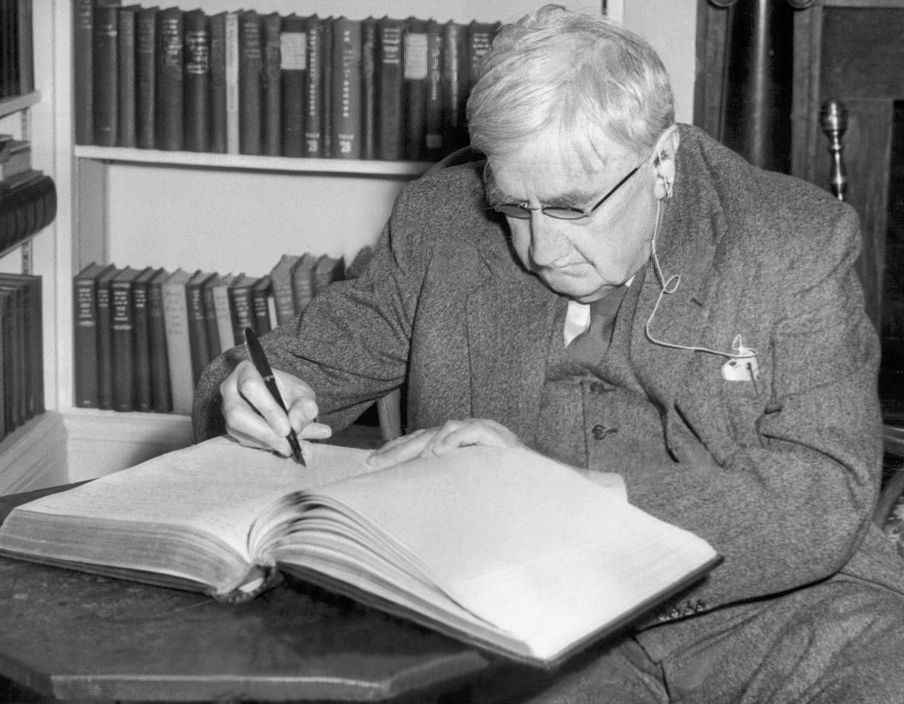
Vaughan Williams in 1955

Ralph Vaughan Williams's Symphony No. 8 in D minor was composed between 1953 and 1955. Sir John Barbirolli, its dedicatee, conducted the Hallé Orchestra in the premiere at the Kings Hall in Manchester, on 2 May 1956. It is the shortest of the composer's nine symphonies, and is mostly buoyant and optimistic in tone.

== Background and first performances ==
By the mid-1950s Vaughan Williams, in his eighties, was regarded as the Grand Old Man of English music, much though he disliked the term. Between 1903 and 1952 he had composed seven symphonies, and in 1953 he started sketching out another. Progress was slowed by his busy schedule, including a long spell lecturing and conducting in the US in the second half of 1954, but by January 1955 the symphony was substantially complete. While it was in the final stages of composition the composer and his wife went to a performance of Turandot at Covent Garden, at which Vaughan Williams became fascinated by the tuned gongs extensively used in Puccini's score, and he added them to the already large percussion section required for the symphony.

The work was not written to commission, but Sir John Barbirolli, conductor-in-chief of the Hallé Orchestra, asked Vaughan Williams for a new piece, and the composer offered him the symphony. Conductor and orchestra gave the composer a private run-through of the work in February 1956, and the premiere was scheduled for Manchester in May. The composer inscribed the manuscript, "For Glorious John, with love and admiration from Ralph" and the published score is headed "Dedicated to Sir John Barbirolli".

The first performance was given by the Hallé, conducted by Barbirolli, at the Kings Hall in Manchester on 2 May 1956. It was recorded by the BBC and subsequently released on disc. The same orchestra and conductor gave the London premiere at the Royal Festival Hall on 14 May.

The Philadelphia Orchestra conducted by Eugene Ormandy gave the work its US premiere on 5 October 1956. The following year, on 30 June, Leopold Stokowski conducted the London Symphony Orchestra in the work at the Festival Hall. Charles Munch conducted the Boston Symphony Orchestra in a series of performances of the work, beginning on 31 October 1957.

== Music ==
Vaughan Williams's earlier symphonies either had titles (A Sea Symphony, A London Symphony, Pastoral Symphony, Sinfonia antartica) or were published as Symphony in F minor, in D major and in E minor. Those in the latter group were widely referred to as Symphonies No 4, 5, and 6, but Vaughan Williams disapproved: "I have never put numbers to my symphonies and don't want to start now". In the end the new work was published, by the Oxford University Press, as "Symphony No 8 in D minor".

The Eighth is the shortest of Vaughan Williams's nine symphonies, a typical performance taking just under half an hour.

The symphony is scored for an orchestra with conventional woodwind, brass, and string sections (enlarged by an extra harp) but an augmented percussion section.

- Woodwinds: two flutes (second doubling piccolo), two oboes, two clarinets (in B♭), two bassoons
- Brass: two horns (in F), two trumpets (in B♭), three trombones
- Percussion: timpani, vibraphone, triangle, glockenspiel, side drum, cymbals, tubular bells, tuned gongs, bass drum, xylophone, celesta
- Strings: two harps, and strings

The work is in four movements.

=== I. Fantasia ===
The opening movement, in D minor, has the subtitle Variazioni senza tema – variations without a theme. The critic and musicologist Michael Kennedy writes that the movement is "among the most highly and skilfully organised" that Vaughan Williams wrote, "with rich and diverse thematic material". As the composer noted, the movement can be analysed in terms of traditional sonata form, with the opening moderato freely recapitulated as the allegro vivace sixth section, and the chorale-like third section as the largamente seventh.

There are three principal motifs, all closely related: two rising fourths for trumpet, answered by vibraphone; a phrase for flute in jig time; and a descending figure for strings. Kennedy writes that the variations illustrate various facets of the composer's style: "The second, presto, plays around with all three motifs; the third is a chorale-like tune in A minor for strings and harp with a subsidiary theme for oboe and cello". The themes of both variations, and of the fourth (an allegretto in 6/8 for oboe and clarinet) derive from the initial trumpet motif. In the fifth variation the trumpet figure is extended for cellos and harp; the sixth is quicker and elaborates the flute motif for bassoons, cellos and basses. In the seventh variation the tune of the third is given at a slower tempo. The movement ends with the opening motif returning on the trumpet, with, in Kennedy's phrase, "a final shimmer on vibraphone and strings".

=== II. Scherzo alla marcia ===
This movement, in C minor, is labelled "per stromenti a fiato" – for wind instruments – and is scored for woodwind and brass only. Although it contains 181 bars as opposed to the 111 of the slow movement its fast pace makes it the shortest movement of the symphony in performance, usually playing for under four minutes. Like the first movement, it has three main themes: one for bassoons, one for trumpet and one for flutes and other high woodwind. A fugato section is followed by a trio in pastoral vein, and a brief return of the scherzo brings the movement to a close.

=== III. Cavatina ===
The third movement, a cavatina in E minor, is scored for strings only. This movement, in a five-part rondo form, has a meditative character; Kennedy calls it a "beautiful old-age reverie of farewell to Tallis and larks ascending". The main theme bears a resemblance to the traditional chorale that Vaughan Williams, as editor, included in the English Hymnal as "O sacred head sore wounded". The tune is used in Bach's St Matthew Passion, a work close to Vaughan Williams's heart, and he said that its appearance in the symphony was "a mix-up in my mind". The theme, in E minor, is given to the cellos accompanied by occasional pianissimo chords and pizzicato bass; the second subject, in A♭, is played by the violins. The central interlude of the movement is a rhapsodic episode with violin solo, and in the recapitulation and coda, dominated by a solo cello line, the first and second subjects are combined. The movement closes quietly in E major.

=== IV. Finale ===
The D major / D minor finale is headed Toccata to indicate its virtuoso and exuberant character. After a loud stroke of the gong and bell the full orchestra states the first theme, alternating with the same theme played by tuned percussion. A lyrical theme follows, played by violins against a repeated woodwind figure. As the movement progresses to its climax the large percussion section dominates – the composer said the piece employed "all the 'phones and 'spiels known to the composer".

The Eighth is the only of Vaughan Williams's symphonies other than the Fourth to end loudly. The others all have quiet conclusions, some fading to Vaughan Williams's much favoured marking niente – "nothing".

== Critical reception ==
The Manchester Guardian reported after the premiere, "It is not often that the entire audience in an English concert hall gets on its feet to cheer, particularly after a new work", and the Eighth has remained one of the composer's most popular symphonies. In 2008, the music critic of The Times wrote, "With its witty variations in search of a theme, its sparky scherzo and its toybox of a toccata, the symphony sounds like the work of a young man at the height of his powers".

After the US premiere, the critic Edwin H. Schloss called the symphony "a work of stimulating originality – music of a freshness, exuberance and warmth", the scherzo "pert, garrulous and brimming with delightful humor" and the cavatina "music of great lyric loveliness". Schloss reported that the work was greeted "with a torrent of applause". When Ormandy and the orchestra took the work to New York Douglas Watt found it "sunny, lively, expertly tailored and winning". The New York Music Critics' Circle named the piece as the best new symphony of the year. Reviewing the first recording to be issued of the work the critic Harold C. Schonberg concluded that Vaughan Williams "could well be today's major symphonist".

Among assessments in the 21st century, Grove's Dictionary of Music and Musicians (2001) says of the piece:

The Eighth, in D minor, has a comparative lightness of heart and a capacity for humour, but these qualities are shot through with sadness and anxiety, even in the rumbustious finale; melodic allusions to Holst and Bach suggest that a thread of remembrance for the fallen of World War I, and for absent friends in general, runs through the work.

== Recordings ==
Year	Orchestra	Conductor	Location	Ref
1956	Hallé	Sir John Barbirolli	Free Trade Hall, Manchester	
1956	Hallé	Sir John Barbirolli	Free Trade Hall	
1956	London Philharmonic	Sir Adrian Boult	Kingsway Hall, London	
1958	Boston Symphony	Charles Munch	Music Shed, Tanglewood	
1959	New York Philharmonic	Sir John Barbirolli	Carnegie Hall, New York	
1961	Hallé	Sir John Barbirolli	Teatro Kursaal, Lugano	
1964	BBC Symphony	Leopold Stokowski	Royal Albert Hall, London	
1967	Hallé	Sir John Barbirolli	Royal Albert Hall	
1968	London Symphony	André Previn	Kingsway Hall	
1969	London Philharmonic	Sir Adrian Boult	Kingsway Hall	
1972	London Philharmonic	Sir Adrian Boult	Royal Festival Hall, London	
1989	USSR State Symphony	Gennady Rozhdestvensky	Philharmonia Building, Leningrad	
1989	London Symphony	Bryden Thomson	St Jude-on-the-Hill, Hampstead, London	
1991	Philharmonia	Leonard Slatkin	Abbey Road Studios, London	
1992	Royal Liverpool Philharmonic	Vernon Handley	Philharmonic Hall, Liverpool	
1993	BBC Symphony	Andrew Davis	St Augustine's, Kilburn, London	
1996	Bournemouth SO	Kees Bakels	Poole Arts Centre	
2000	London Philharmonic	Bernard Haitink	Abbey Road	
2003	London Symphony	Richard Hickox	All Saints Church, Tooting, London	
2008	London Philharmonic	Vladimir Jurowski	Royal Festival Hall	
2012	Hallé	Sir Mark Elder	BBC Studios MediaCityUK, Salford	
2015	Royal Liverpool Philharmonic	Andrew Manze	Philharmonic Hall, Liverpool	

== References and sources ==
=== Sources ===
- Cobbe, Hugh (2010). Letters of Ralph Vaughan Williams, 1895–1958. Oxford: Oxford University Press. ISBN 978-0-19-925797-3.
- Dearmer, Percy; Vaughan Williams, Ralph (1906). The English Hymnal. Oxford: Oxford University Press. OCLC 1044637845.
- Doctor, Jenny (2013). "Vaughan Williams, Boult and the BBC". In Alain Frogley; Aidan J. Thomson (eds.). The Cambridge Companion to Vaughan Williams. Cambridge: Cambridge University Press. ISBN 978-1-107-65026-8.
- Frogley, Alain (2013). "History and Geography: the early choral works and the first three symphonies". In Alain Frogley; Aidan J. Thomson (eds.). The Cambridge Companion to Vaughan Williams. Cambridge: Cambridge University Press. ISBN 978-1-107-65026-8.
- Kennedy, Michael (2013). "Fluctuations in the response to the music of Ralph Vaughan Williams". In Alain Frogley; Aidan J. Thomson (eds.). The Cambridge Companion to Vaughan Williams. Cambridge: Cambridge University Press. ISBN 978-1-107-65026-8.
- Mark, Christopher (2013). "Chamber music and works for soloist with orchestra". In Alain Frogley; Aidan J. Thomson (eds.). The Cambridge Companion to Vaughan Williams. Cambridge: Cambridge University Press. ISBN 978-1-107-65026-8.
- Pople, Anthony (1996). "Tallis and the Phantasy principle". In Alain Frogley (ed.). Vaughan Williams Studies. Cambridge: Cambridge University Press. ISBN 978-0-521-48031-4.
- Schwartz, Elliott (1982) [1964]. The Symphonies of Ralph Vaughan Williams. New York: Da Capo Press. ISBN 978-0-306-76137-9.
- Vaughan Williams, Ralph (1956). Symphony No 8 in D minor. Oxford: Oxford University Press. OCLC 638246901.
- Vaughan Williams, Ursula (1964). RVW: A Biography of Ralph Vaughan Williams. Oxford: Oxford University Press. ISBN 978-0-19-315411-7.
