= Safari (1956 film) =

British Cinemascope adventure film

- British original 1956 promotional poster
- Directed by: Terence Young
- Screenplay by: Robert Buckner
- Story by: Anthony Veiller
- Produced by: Irving Allen; Albert R. Broccoli
- Starring: Victor Mature; Janet Leigh; John Justin; Roland Culver; Liam Redmond; Earl Cameron; Orlando Martins
- Cinematography: John Wilcox
- Edited by: Michael Gordon
- Music by: William Alwyn
- Production company: Warwick Films
- Distributed by: Columbia Pictures (UK)
- Release date: 6 April 1956 (UK)
- Running time: 91 minutes
- Country: United Kingdom
- Languages: English, Swahili
- Box office: $1.4 million (US rentals); 1,764,445 admissions (France)

Safari is a 1956 British CinemaScope adventure film directed by Terence Young and set during the Mau Mau Uprising in Kenya. It stars Victor Mature, Janet Leigh, Roland Culver, John Justin, and Earl Cameron, and was intentionally cast to attract an American audience—both the hero Ken Duffield and the lead female character Linda Latham are Americans, played by American actors.

== Plot ==
While American white hunter Ken Duffield is off leading a safari, Mau Mau rebels attack his farm, slaughtering the labourers and his livestock. Duffield's young son Charley and Aunt May defend their home against the mass attack but they do not know that their houseboy Jeroge (a corruption of Njoroge) is actually a Mau Mau general. Inside the farmhouse, Jeroge murders Aunt May with a machete and Charley is killed with May's rifle.

When Duffield returns to his destroyed homestead, the police have obtained information about Jeroge's role in the affair. Surmising that Duffield will use his hunting expertise to track down and revenge himself on the terrorists in general and Jeroge in particular, they escort him back to Nairobi and revoke his hunting licence until the situation and Duffield cools down.

Duffield spends his exile in Nairobi drinking and gathering information about Jeroge from his African friends. He gets his chance for revenge when the rich Sir Vincent Brampton, accompanied by his flunky Brian Sinden and his young American trophy fiancée Linda Latham, arrive in Nairobi. They are keen to hire Duffield to lead a safari so that Sir Vincent can kill a legendary man-eating lion named Hatari (Swahili for "risky" or "dangerous"). Duffield knows that Hatari resides in an area which Jeroge is known to frequent, and that Sir Vincent can use his influence to get his hunting licence back.

Setting off on safari with his boss boy Jerusalem and Odongo, Sir Vincent suspects Duffield is not interested in hunting lions when he carries a Sten gun; Duffield explaining "you never know what kind of animals you may find". Sir Vincent has his suspicion confirmed when Duffield jumps out of his Land Rover to join the police in a firefight against the Mau Mau and is keen to extract information from the prisoners.

Duffield keeps his promise to bring Sir Vincent and his party to Hatari's turf in the land of the Maasai, where the audience witnesses a traditional Maasai lion hunt. But his plans face peril when a police radio report reveals that an unknown member of the safari is a Mau Mau plant. In addition, the obsessive Sir Vincent is determined to get sole credit for killing Hatari and therefore unloads Duffield's rifle, while Linda decides to take an excursion down a crocodile-infested river in a rubber dinghy. Another police radio report warns that 200 Mau Mau prisoners have escaped and are headed towards Duffield's safari to link up with Jeroge.

Sir Vincent is so obsessed with killing the lion that he fires at Duffield. In the midst of this situation, Hatari the lion appears on a ledge above Sir Vincent and pounces. Although the lion is killed it has fatally wounded Sir Vincent. In a final scene, the group and local police, have to each take arms to defend themselves against an onslaught from Mau Mau attackers, and Duffield's Sten gun is put to use.

== Cast ==
- Victor Mature as Ken Duffield
- Janet Leigh as Linda Latham
- John Justin as Brian Sinden
- Roland Culver as Sir Vincent Brampton
- Liam Redmond as Roy Shaw
- Earl Cameron as Jeroge (Njoroge)
- Orlando Martins as Jerusalem
- Juma as Odongo
- Lionel Ngakane as Kakora
- Harry Quashie as O'Keefe
- Slim Harris as Renegade
- Cy Grant as Chief Massai
- John Wynn as Charley Duffield
- Arthur Lovegrove as Blake
- Estelle Brody as Aunty May

== Production ==
=== Development ===
The movie was one of several action films from Warwick Productions. Rhonda Fleming was originally announced for the female lead role of Linda Latham and the producers were hoping to get Humphrey Bogart to star.

Location filming in Kenya began in June 1955 before the film had been cast. Victor Mature had signed a two-picture contract with Warwick Films and he was assigned to the lead. He was meant to make Zarak but ended up making Safari first. In 1959 Warwick's Irving Allen said "You think I employ Victor Mature because I like that big lug? I employ him because he brings in the money and he isn't a genius boy."

=== Shooting ===
Producer Andy Worker said he had to get Victor Mature drunk before the actor would get on the plane as he was so afraid of flying.

Filming began 1 August 1955 in Elstree Studios in London. Five weeks later the unit transferred to Kenya for location shooting.

The film was shot on location in Kenya simultaneously with John Gilling's Odongo with the Zanzibar-born child actor Juma repeating his role as Odongo. In an interview in 1997, Janet Leigh recalled that the film's second unit was actually attacked by the Mau Mau.

The budget was £299,609 plus fees for Mature, Leigh, Allen and Albert R. Broccoli.

== Reception ==
The film premiered on 6 April 1956 at the Empire Cinema in London, and the reviewer for The Times was not very favourable, in a review titled "Safari: An American film about the Mau Mau":

"Surely it is neither priggish nor pompous to find something disagreeable in the idea of so horrifying an episode as the Mau Mau terrorism in Kenya serving as material for a film whose purpose is solely to entertain – another film, made with a British cast on the same subject, has a purpose above and beyond that. Again, it is not intolerably insular to take the line that it is all wrong that an American, played by an American actor, should be the hero, and shown as the only one capable of dealing with the situation. Finally, there are those squeamish enough not to feel altogether comfortable at the sight of an elephant, a lion, and a rhinoceros being shot – it is to be hoped the scenes were faked – to give the audience a vicarious thrill. -- A film that leaves an unpleasant taste in the mouth."

Filmink called it the worst of the five movies Mature made for Warwick.
