= Chimpanzees' tea party =

Historical form of public entertainment

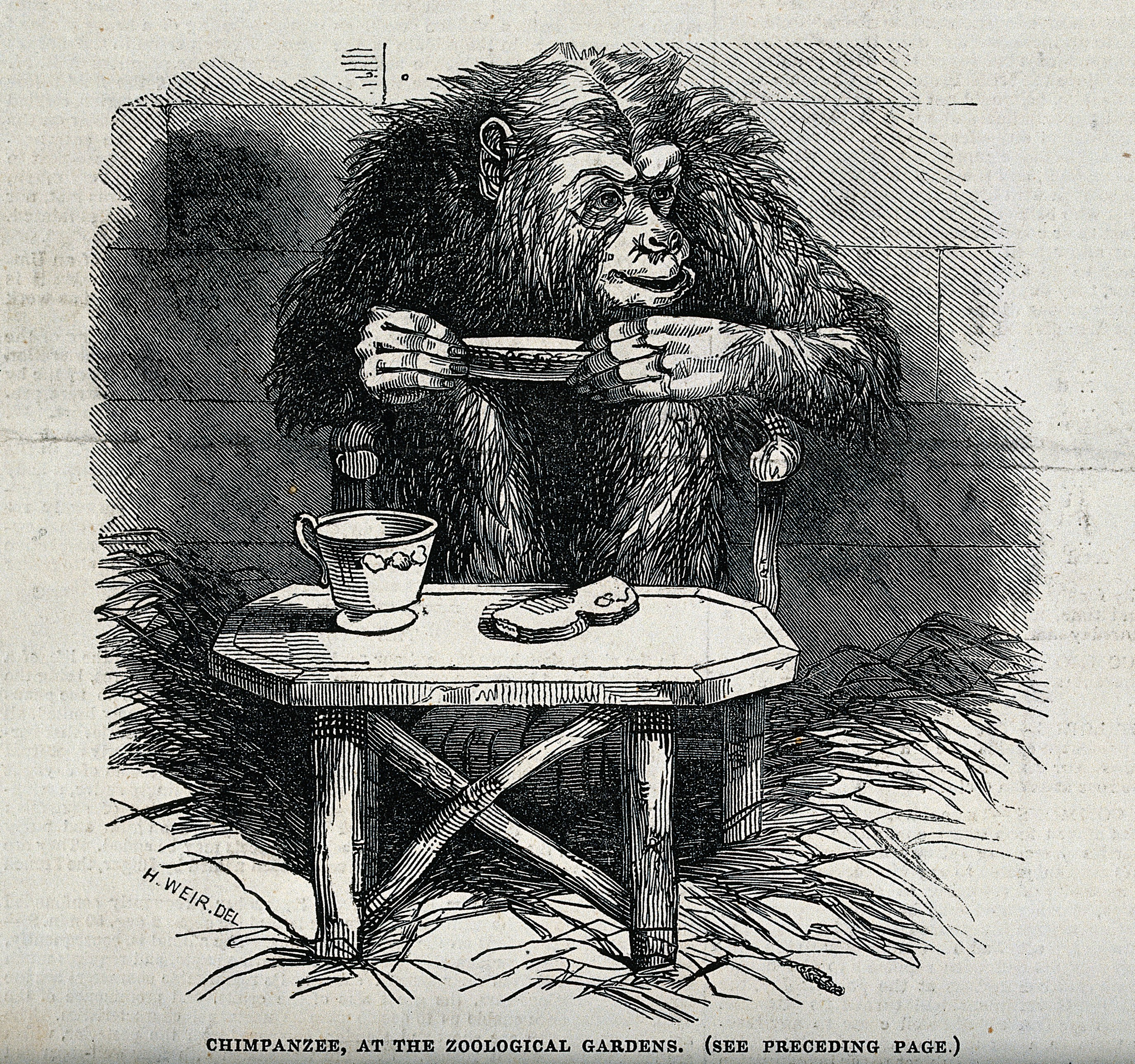
Depiction of a chimpanzee in a zoo drinking tea

The chimpanzee tea party was a form of public entertainment in which chimpanzees were dressed in human clothes and provided with a table of food and drink.

The first such tea party was held at the London Zoo in 1926, two years after the opening of Monkey Hill. They were put on almost daily during the summer until they were discontinued in 1972. Tea parties were also adopted by other institutions seeking to draw crowds. The chimpanzees, adorned in hats, dresses, and other garments, would engage in activities reminiscent of a sophisticated tea party, such as sipping from cups, nibbling on snacks, and interacting with each other in playful ways. This idea was even used for marketing techniques in the 1900s. They were the inspiration for the PG Tips television advertisements which began in 1956. Neil Heath notes that teaching chimpanzees human behaviors and using them in advertising campaigns raised animal welfare concerns, leading to the discontinuation of these practices.

== History ==
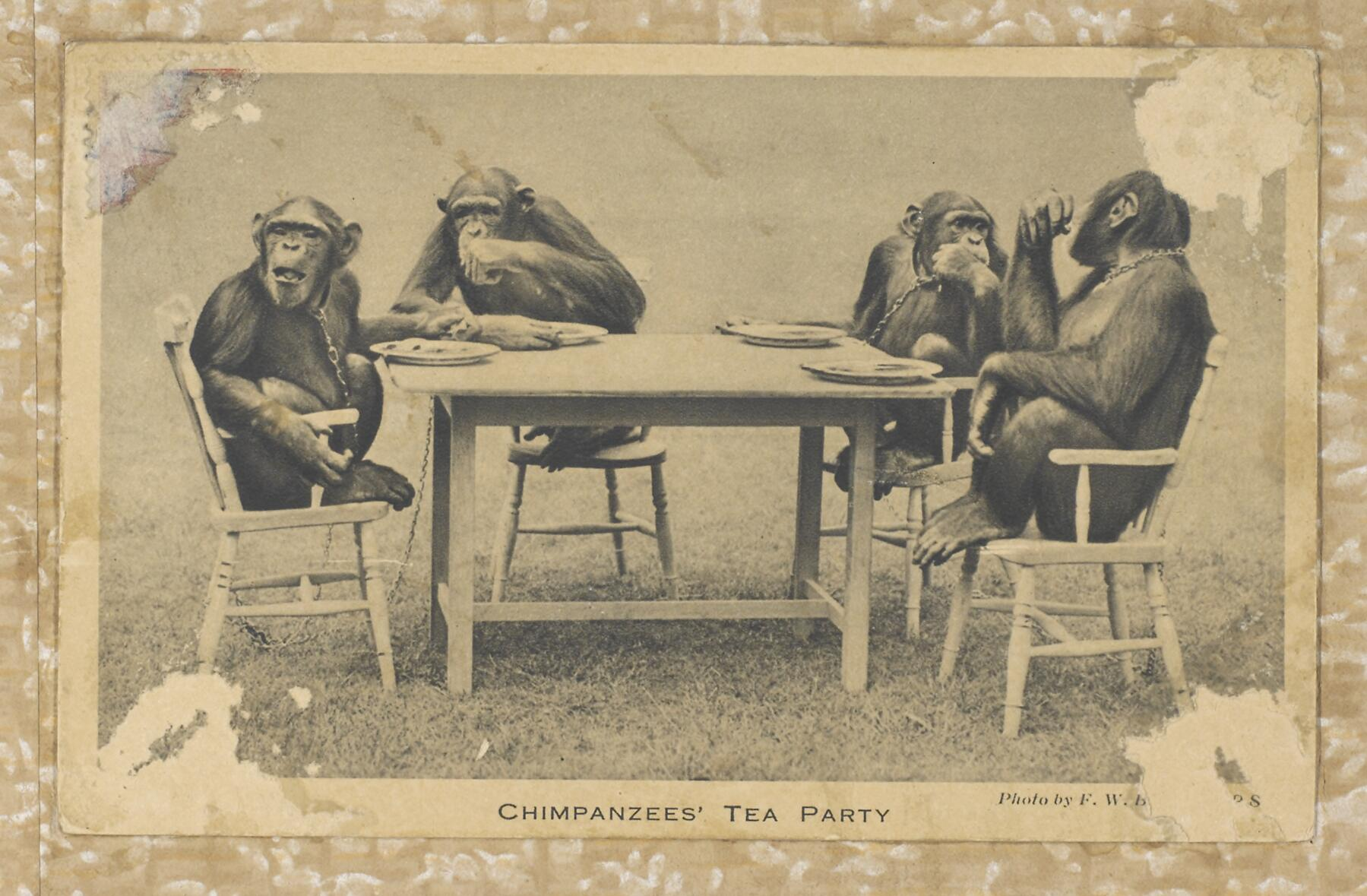
Cutout of a chimpazees' tea party made by Anne Frank

The chimpanzee tea party events began in the London Zoo in 1926 as an attraction for displaying the Zoo's primates. The Wellington Zoo also displayed chimpanzee tea parties around this time, ending them in 1956. The phenomenon reached numerous other zoos, spreading to New York, Moscow, and New Zealand, among other places. The act became so popular and well known that in 1956 the Mayor of Auckland was photographed having tea with chimpanzees from London. The chimpanzee tea party phenomenon also influenced the beginning of the chimp-themed PG Tips commercials. The chimpanzees also acted out other human characters such as men moving furniture and women ironing laundry.

Once the zoo shows gained popularity in London, this event spread to the marketing world. Notably, companies like PG Tips seized upon the appeal of trained chimpanzees and monkeys to craft television advertisements. PG Tips used them for television ads from 1956 to 2002, as the chimpanzees proved very popular with audiences. The practice of the chimpanzee tea party generally fell out of favor around the 1970s, although in a few cases, it continued into the 2000s.

== Causes ==
Originating as a means to enhance the appeal of zoos and attract larger audiences, the introduction of animals into zoo shows emerged as a popular form of entertainment in the early 1900s. Spearheaded by institutions such as the London Zoo, these shows showcased the abilities of chimpanzees and other animals, drawing visitors from distant locales and establishing a trend that transcended geographical boundaries into many other countries.

== Impacts ==
As popularity rose, The London Zoo began shipping out the juvenile tea party chimps to other zoos and institutions. Allen, Park, and Watt contend that the treatment of the chimps in the tea party events reflected the attitude of Euro-Americans toward dark-skinned people as well as children or babies. This attitude expects the subject groups to act in an impolite manner which is also expected of the chimpanzees in the tea parties. The discontinuation of this practice was a decision based on both financial consideration and changes in zoo policies based on the changing of the generalized idea of acceptable treatment of animals and entertainment standards. Allen, Parker, and Watt state the tea party chimps were linked to many important topics such as views on youth, status, morals, etc.

Chimpanzees faced some behavioral changes due to the training for the tea parties. This changed behavior hindered the socialization of the trained chimpanzees with their untrained comrades, and it led to increased isolation and human reliance, along with occasional aggressive outbursts.

== Animal rights ==
The discontinuation of PG Tips' chimpanzee ads was applauded by advocates for animal rights, who viewed the move as an important advance. The Animal Welfare Act 2006 in the United Kingdom added restrictions to the treatment of animals, further curtailing their use in entertainment.

== See also ==
- Anthropomorphism
- Pongidae/pongid
- The animal rights movement in the 1900s
- Cognitive Science and Animal Intelligence
- Animal Welfare Act 2006
