= Anthony Squire =

English screenwriter and director (1914–2000)

- Born: Jack Francis Anthony Squire; 5 May 1914; London, England
- Died: 15 May 2000 (aged 86); London, England
- Occupations: Screenwriter and director
- Years active: 1949–1989
- Spouse: Shelagh Fraser (1961–?)

Jack Francis Anthony Squire (5 May 1914 – 15 May 2000) was an English film and television screenwriter and director. He was married for a time to the actress Shelagh Fraser.

Born in London, he is best known for his work on ITC television series of the 1950s such as The Adventures of Robin Hood and William Tell.

He also worked as a second unit director in several films, in which he specialised in set pieces including the James Bond films Casino Royale (1967) and On Her Majesty's Secret Service (1969) (the stock-car sequence) and the aerial sequences for both The Blue Max (1966) and Darling Lili (1970).

== Selected filmography ==
- Files from Scotland Yard (1951)
