= The Adventures of Sir Lancelot =

1956 British television series

- Titlecard from the colour episodes
- Created by: Leslie Pointon (Head writer); Based on traditional legends
- Starring: William Russell
- Opening theme: Edwin Astley
- Ending theme: Alan Lomax
- Composers: Edwin Astley; Albert Elms
- Country of origin: United Kingdom
- Original language: English
- No. of series: 1
- No. of episodes: 30

Production
- Executive producer: Hannah Weinstein
- Producers: Sidney Cole; Dallas Bower; Bernard Knowles
- Running time: 25 minutes
- Production company: Sapphire Films

Original release
- Network: ITV
- Release: 15 September 1956 – 20 April 1957

The Adventures of Sir Lancelot is a British television series first broadcast in 1956, produced by Sapphire Films for ITC Entertainment and screened on the ITV network. The series starred William Russell as the eponymous Sir Lancelot, a Knight of the Round Table in the time of King Arthur at Camelot.

In the United States, it was originally broadcast on NBC from 1956 to 1957. Its success on the network led to it becoming the first British television series to have entire episodes filmed in colour, with episodes 16–20 and 22–30 being shot in colour, although they were only seen in colour in the US at the time of television transmission. While the BBC's 1954 TV series Zoo Quest pre-dated The Adventures of Sir Lancelot's use of colour film stock by two years, this was only for the location work, whilst the studio links were captured by monochrome video cameras.

As was common with other British television series of the time, the programme employed several American screenwriters who had moved to Britain after being placed on the Hollywood blacklist, often under pseudonyms. These included Ian McLellan Hunter, Hy Kraft and Ring Lardner Jr. The series was made at Nettlefold Studios in Walton-on-Thames.

== Cast and characters ==
- William Russell as Sir Lancelot (30 episodes)
- Cyril Smith as Merlin (24 episodes)
- Ronald Leigh-Hunt as King Arthur (22 episodes)
- Bruce Seton as King Arthur (Episodes 1-3 only)
- Robert Scroggins as Brian (Lancelot's squire) (22 episodes)
- David Morrell as Sir Kay & others (21 episodes)
- Jane Hylton as Queen Guinevere (14 episodes)
- Derren Nesbitt (credited as Derry Nesbitt) as Sir Tristan & others (14 episodes)

== Broadcast history ==
The series debuted in the UK on Saturday 15 September 1956, on weekend ITV franchise holders ABC Weekend TV (Midlands and North) and ATV (London), with ABC showing the series half an hour ahead of ATV, and on the NBC network in the United States nine days later. The last episode was shown on 13 April 1957 on ATV and on 16 September 1957 on NBC. It later transferred networks in the US to ABC, who repeated the episodes from October 1957 to September 1958. The series was gradually introduced on the different ITV regional channels in the UK as they came on the air from 1956 to 1962. Currently being shown on Talking Pictures TV in the UK.

== Episodes ==
Air dates are for ABC Midlands and North; ITV regions varied date and order. The bolded episode titles were shot in colour.

No.	Title	Directed by	Written by	Original release date
1	"The Knight with the Red Plume"	Ralph Smart	Leighton Reynolds	15 September 1956
Sir Lancelot is challenged by the other knights before he can become a member of King Arthur's Knights of the Round Table. He has to prove his worth and is put through a series of rigorous tests. Guest stars: Andrew Crawford as Sir Gawaine, Peter Bennett as Leonides, Brian Worth as Sir Kay, Paul Hansard as Sir Lionel, Edwin Richfield as Sir Christopher
2	"The Ferocious Fathers"	Ralph Smart	Leighton Reynolds	22 September 1956
Sir Lancelot goes to the rescue of Urgan the Strong, whose castle is besieged by Sir Melius the Mighty and his two sons. When Sir Lancelot drives off the invaders, Urgan offers his daughter, Helen, in marriage to the knight as a reward for his bravery; but Urgan then attacks and besieges Sir Melius's castle, forcing Lancelot to change sides. During this incident, Sir Lancelot acquires a young squire. Guest stars: Ballard Berkeley as Sir Urgan the Strong and Frederick Treves as Rolf
3	"The Queen's Knight"	Ralph Smart	Leslie Poynton	29 September 1956
Queen Guinevere is kidnapped by King Arthur's cousin, Sir Mordred. He and his father, King Pell, demand that King Arthur cede them part of his kingdom, Northumbria, in exchange for the Queen's life. Sir Lancelot, the Queen's champion, in attempting to rescue her, is cast into the enemy's dungeons. Guest stars: John Dearth as King Pell and Andrew Crawford as Sir Gawaine
4	"The Outcast"	Bernard Knowles	Leslie Poynton	6 October 1956
When Sir Lancelot leaves on a mission, he requests that his squire be trained in his absence to become a knight of the Round Table. But Squire Brian encounters considerable opposition and then is framed for a theft from the Queen. Guest stars: Patrick McGoohan as Sir Glavin and Frederick Treves as Clerk
5	"Winged Victory"	Arthur Crabtree	John Ridgely	13 October 1956
King Arthur entrusts Sir Lancelot to carry a secret battle plan to Prince Boudwin, who is besieged in his castle by King Mark and is badly in need of aid. When Sir Lancelot and Squire Brian arrive they are captured, and King Mark attempts to coerce them into revealing the secret information. Guest stars: Nigel Green as King Mark, Douglas Argent as Prince Boudwin.
6	"Sir Bliant"	Bernard Knowles	John Ridgely	20 October 1956
Sir Bliant's three sons decide to break the truce King Arthur has arranged between their father and Sir Rolf. They carry Sir Rolf's three daughters away as hostages, and the distraught father appeals to King Arthur for assistance.
7	"The Pirates"	Bernard Knowles	Leslie Poynton	27 October 1956
King Arthur and his men set off to capture a band of pirates who they believe are hiding out in a coastal town. Actually, the pirates are merely waiting for them to leave Camelot so that they can raid it.
8	"The Magic Sword"	Arthur Crabtree	Leighton Reynolds	3 November 1956
A cowardly knight wants to rescue a lady who is imprisoned by her brother. He comes to King Arthur for advice on how to become courageous. Merlin instils confidence in the young knight by lending him Sir Lancelot's sword, and telling him it has magic powers. Guest stars: Dan Cunningham as Sir Bernard and Frederick Treves as First Peasant.
9	"Lancelot's Banishment"	Anthony Squire	Peggy Philips	10 November 1956
Sir Lancelot is banished from Camelot because King Arthur believes he made a false claim against King Marhaus. Outside of Camelot, Lancelot encounters Marhaus and discovers an evil plot.
10	"Roman Wall"	Arthur Crabtree	Harold Kent	17 November 1956
Sir Lancelot and his squire Brian go to the aid of King Boltan, who swears that ghosts have abducted his daughter.
11	"Caledon"	Bernard Knowles	Leighton Reynolds	24 November 1956
While Sir Lancelot is on a mission for King Arthur, he is robbed and his horse is killed by a group of wild warriors. Guest stars: George Murcell as Jaggyd and Nigel Green as Farmer
12	"Theft of Excalibur"	Bernard Knowles	H.H. Burns and Peggy Philips	1 December 1956
On St Stephen's Day, King Arthur and his knights traditionally change places for one day with the court squires. During the day, one of the "squires-for-a-day" steals the sword Excalibur.
13	"The Black Castle"	Bernard Knowles	Leslie Poynton	8 December 1956
A young knight's prospective father-in-law has been kidnapped and is being held prisoner. Sir Lancelot agrees to help the knight rescue the man.
14	"Shepherds' War"	Bernard Knowles	Leslie Poynton	15 December 1956
A band of renegade knights is preying on the shepherds in the area. Sir Lancelot decides to champion the shepherds' cause and masquerades as a shepherd to teach them how to fight the knights off. Guest star: Jennifer Jayne as Elsa, Edmund Warwick as Matt and Frederick Treves as Colman
15	"The Magic Book"	Terry Bishop	Peggy Philips	22 December 1956
Sir Lancelot volunteers to defend an Abbey and its occupants against invading Vikings.
16	"**The Ruby of Radnor**"	Lawrence Huntington	Hamish Hamilton Burns	29 December 1956
As punishment for rebelling over working with Merlin's pigeons, Squire Brian is sent on an errand delivering a crate of pigeons to a neighbouring castle. En route, he becomes involved with a gang of thieves who have stolen the precious Ruby of Radnor. Guest stars: Colin Tapley as Everard, Edward Judd as Garth, Eric Corrie as Robert, Reginald Hearne as Hugo, Harold Goodwin as a peasant.
17	"**The Lesser Breed**"	Terry Bishop	Peggy Phillips	5 January 1957
King Arthur learns that a nearby village is being terrorized by a horrible monster. Sir Lancelot is sent to investigate. He discovers that the monster is really a Viking boat and that it's the Vikings who are doing the terrorizing. Guest stars: Ann Stephens as Sella, Gerard Heinz as Eck, Wilfrid Brambell as a fisherman and Edward Judd as Auctioneer.
18	"**Witches Brew**"	Terry Bishop	Peggy Phillips	12 January 1957
A woman claiming to possess mystical powers has convinced King Bors of Sagitaw that she is working evil against him. Sir Lancelot enlists Merlin's aid against her powers. Guest stars: Maxine Audley as Eunice, Leonard Sachs as King Rolf and Edward Judd as Soldier.
19	"**Sir Crustabread**"	Lawrence Huntington	Leslie Poynton	19 January 1957
King Arthur gives Sir Lancelot a new name and sends him off to champion a lady who is being forced into marrying an unscrupulous man. Guest stars: Virginia Vernon as Lynette, Hector Ross as Baron Brayor and Frederick Jaeger as Sir Christopher.
20	"**Maid of Somerset**"	Bernard Knowles	Selwyn Jepson	26 January 1957
A young girl asks Sir Lancelot's aid. An evil monarch, King Meliot, is selling the young men of the village of Cheddar into slavery. Guest stars: Patricia Kneale as Ellen, Edward Judd as James, Eddie Malin as Paul, Reginald Hearne as the Chamberlain.
21	"Knight Errant"	Bernard Knowles	Peggy Philips and Selwyn Jepson	2 February 1957
After their father dies, two sisters inherit his tiny impoverished kingdom. Their guardian is eager to set up a rich marriage for the older girl, but she is not willing.
22	"**Double Identity**"	Lawrence Huntington	Harold Kent	9 February 1957
Sir Richard of Taunton is attacked and beaten by three men and left for dead. His uncle plans to substitute his son, Richard's double, and gain control of the family estate. Lancelot is suspicious and starts investigating. Guest stars: Howard Pays as Sir Richard / Sir Alfred, John Bailey as Sir John and Edward Judd as Priest.
23	"**The Lady Lilith**"	Lawrence Huntingdon	Leslie Poynton	16 February 1957
The Lady Lilith has been running the castle of Goodhue since it was left to her by the late Sir William when she was 14 years old. Sir Liones petitions for a ruling at the court of the king because the law says that no property can be inherited by a woman. Facing a difficult choice, King Arthur suggests the best solution would be for Sir Liones to marry the Lady. Guest stars: Shirley Cooklin as Lady Lilith, Richard Leech as Sir Liones, Edward Judd as Abel, Eric Corrie as the Seneschal, Reginald Hearne as a blacksmith
24	"**The Bridge**"	Peter Maxwell	Peter Key	23 February 1957
While preparing for knighthood, Squire Brian uncovers a plot by King Marhaus of neighbouring Mercia. The king wants it to appear that the villagers of Poltifax have violated a treaty over the use of their bridge so that he will have an excuse to invade their town. Zena Walker as Angela, Derek Aylward as King Marhaus, Jack May as Caradoc, Eric Corrie as the Priest, Edward Judd as Sir Grint and Max Faulkner as a peasant
25	"**The Ugly Duckling**"	George More O'Ferrall	Leslie Poynton	9 March 1957
While on a visit to castle Lamorack, Sir Lancelot and Merlin try to help their host when he receives a note threatening his daughter's life. Merlin learns that the note is false, written by the girl herself in a bid for attention. Later, the girl disappears and another note arrives; this time it's genuine. Guest stars: Carol Marsh as Sybil, Jeanette Hutchinson as Amora, Hector Ross as Sir Egbert, Avice Landone as Lady Lamorak, Ian Whittaker as Gault, David Morrell as Sir Kay, Edward Judd as Sir Christopher
26	"**Knights Choice**"	Peter Maxwell	Peggy Phillips	16 March 1957
After the death of a knight of the Round Table, a young man enters a tournament that will decide who will fill the vacancy. But the other knights object to the young contestant because of his shabby appearance. Sir Lancelot intercedes for him. Guest stars: Alison Leggatt as Morgana Le Fay, Robert Hardy as Rupert, Derek Waring as Balin, Reginald Hearne as Sir Julian, Edward Judd as a sentry, Eric Corrie as Herold
27	"**The Missing Princess**"	Desmond Davis	Leslie Poynton	23 March 1957
When a king breaks a treaty between his country and a tribe of women, his sister is taken hostage. Sir Lancelot sets forth to rescue the princess. Guest stars: Mary Steele as Anne, Linda Gray as Marta, John Horsley as Athelred, Reginald Hearne as Evanston, Mary Manson as Helga
28	"**The Mortaise Fair**"	Lawrence Huntingdon	Leslie Poynton	30 March 1957
While visiting Mortaise Castle, Queen Guinevere is presented with a priceless jewel from the Rajah of Kaipur. Shortly afterward there is a fire, and during the excitement, the jewel is stolen. Guest stars: Martin Benson as Hassim, Chin Yu as Vuleika, William Franklyn as Baron Mortaise, Eric Corrie as Osbert, Edward Judd as Ronk
29	"**The Thieves**"	Bernard Knowles	H.H. Burns	6 April 1957
King Arthur and Sir Lancelot disguise themselves as thieves in order to test the validity of a statement by Lancelot. The knight believes that the thieves of the kingdom are criminals only because they are starving. Guest stars: Jack Melford as Norrin, John Dearth as Piggott and Edward Judd as King’s Man
30	"**The Prince of Limerick**"	Lawrence Huntington	Leslie Poynton	13 April 1957
A prince in love with King Anguish's daughter Kathleen is banished from the court because he possesses nothing but the ability to write rhymes. Sir Lancelot, hearing of the young couple's plight, travels to Anguish's court to help them. Guest stars: Lynne Furlong as Princess Kathleen, Jerome Willis as Prince, Tony Quinn as King Anguish and Tommy Duggan as Baron Wicklaw

== Home release ==
The complete series of 30 episodes were released as a DVD boxed set in the UK by Network DVD in 2004. Of the 14 episodes made in colour, only 12 are presented in colour on the Network DVD release for financial reasons. The other two colour episodes ('The Ugly Duckling' and 'The Missing Princess') are taken from black and white prints. In the US, the series was released as a DVD boxed set on 19 August 2008 by Timeless Media Group with the exact same 12 episodes presented in colour, taken from US public domain prints. In addition the end credits for episode 24 (The Bridge) are wrong and are in fact the end credits for episode 22 (Double Identity). The end credits do not mention the actress (Zena Walker) who played the "Angela" character, but instead credits Howard Pays who plays the characters Sir Richard and Sir Alfred in the Double Identity episode.

== See also ==
- List of early colour TV shows in the UK
