= The Buccaneers (1956 TV series) =

1956 British TV drama series

- Genre: Swashbuckler
- Starring: Robert Shaw; Paul Hansard; Brian Rawlinson; Edwin Richfield
- Theme music composer: Edwin Astley
- Composers: Edwin Astley; Albert Elms; Ken V. Jones
- Original language: English
- No. of series: 1
- No. of episodes: 39

Production
- Executive producer: Hannah Weinstein
- Producers: Sidney Cole; Ralph Smart; C. M. Pennington-Richards
- Production locations: Falmouth, Cornwall, England
- Running time: 25 minutes
- Production companies: Sapphire Films; ITC Productions

Original release
- Network: ITV
- Release: 19 September 1956 – 12 June 1957

The Buccaneers is a 1956 Sapphire Films television drama series for ITC Entertainment. It was broadcast by CBS in the US and shown on ATV and regional ITV companies as they came on air during the infancy of ITV in the UK.

Starring Robert Shaw as Captain Dan Tempest, the series, aimed at teenagers, followed the adventures of Tempest and his crew of former pirates as they made their way across the seven seas in the Sultana.

This series was one of several swashbuckling adventure series produced during this period by or for Lew Grade's ITC.

== Production notes ==
The series ran for 39 half-hour black-and-white episodes and was produced by Hannah Weinstein and Sidney Cole for Sapphire Films Limited. The episodes were made at Nettlefold Studios at Walton-on-Thames using two studios with seven or eight standing sets. A real schooner was based at Falmouth, Cornwall and a faithful reproduction of part of it in a studio corner.

Rupert Evans, stunt artist, former army teacher of physical training, taught Robert Shaw fencing.

The series was set in the Port of Nassau in New Providence in about 1722.

Sources report that Robert Shaw was unavailable for the first few episodes, but nevertheless shooting went ahead without him.

The complete series is available on R2 DVD from Network in the UK. There are a number of public-domain DVDs of the series in the North American market, as well as a complete series release.

== Cast and characters ==
- Robert Shaw as Captain Dan Tempest
- Peter Hammond as Lieutenant Edward Beamish
- Brian Rawlinson as Gaff Guernsey
- Paul Hansard as Taffy the Welshman
- Wilfred Downing as Dickon
- Edwin Richfield as Armando. Half Spanish. Half Azteca (Episode 28)
- Neil Hallett as Boatswain Sam Bassett
- Willoughby Gray as Pop
- Jane Griffiths as Paula
- Alec Mango as Mr. Van Brugh

Various characters were often played by Tony Thawnton, Terence Cooper, Rupert Evans, Roy Purcell and Denis Lacey.

=== Historical characters ===
- Blackbeard played by George Margo, Terence Cooper
- Governor Woodes Rogers played by Alec Clunes
- Anne Bonny played by Hazel Court
- John Rackham played by Brian Worth
- Bartholomew Roberts played by Alex Scott
- Charles Vane played by Brian Worth
- Benjamin Hornigold played by Andrew Crawford

== Episode list ==
Airdate is for ATV Midlands ITV regions varied date and order.

No.	Title	Directed by	Written by	Original release date
1	"Blackbeard"	Ralph Smart	Thomas A. Stockwell	19 September 1956
Captain and new Governor Woodes Rogers arrives at (Nassau) New Providence island to clean up the pirates there, where he is authorised by the King to offer them all pardons for their past sins. The men know Rogers from his pirate past that he is an honest man and some accept, but Blackbeard (George Margo) and some of his crew disagree and make trouble. Rogers stops a duel between Blackbeard and Ben, shooting Blackbeard in the hand, the same hand he uses a minute later to duel using swords, with Rogers. Blackbeard is disarmed but then Rogers is knocked out by Sawney (Alfie Bass) who is not right in the head. Blackbeard and his men escape to fight another day. Episode also has Hugh David as Benjy, Andrew Crawford as Captain Ben Hornigold, Brian Worth as Rackam, Edwin Richfield as Armando, Peter Bennett as Costellaux, Paul Hansard as Alfie and Patrick Jordan as Morgan. The tavern on the island is called "Fountain of Youth."
2	"The Raiders"	Ralph Smart	Terence Moore	26 September 1956
The date is 1 August 1718, and the island of New Providence is in danger from pirate raiders led by Charles Vane. Governor Rogers must decide on whether to go after Vane, thus leaving the island unprotected, or repairing the damaged fort and waiting for Vane to return and strike again.
3	"Captain Dan Tempest"	Ralph Smart	Terence Moore	3 October 1956
Captain Dan Tempest returns to the island of New Providence. He is several weeks late to accept the pardon and is promptly arrested by Governor Rogers for piracy. He is later approached by Rogers and given a chance to redeem himself by delivering cargo to Charleston. Lt. Beamish accompanies him on the voyage. When they are met on the open sea by Blackbeard, Tempest fights him.
4	"Dan Tempest's War with Spain"	Leslie Arliss	Zachary Weiss	10 October 1956
Governor Rogers has left for Jamaica before this episode starts, with Hornigold. The Spanish land what appears to be a friendly force on the island, then take over and tell Beamish that now Spain is at war with England. Tempest has decided to go back to his pirating ways, but instead saves the Fort with his three shipmates. Episode also has Robert Rietti as Capt. Philip Catalan.
5	"The Wasp"	Terry Bishop	Peter C. Hodgkins	17 October 1956
Dickon (Wilfred Downing) is a wild young boy nicknamed "The Wasp". It is 13 September 1718, and Tempest is given a commission to be a privateer. Dickon is captured by Tempest and becomes his cabin boy, and unknowingly leads Tempest into Blackbeard's trap on his brig "Queen Anne's Revenge" (Blackbeard is now played by Terence Cooper who at other times goes back to playing Costellaux).
6	"Whale Gold"	Leslie Arliss	Zachary Weiss	24 October 1956
Ambergris, a waxy substance secreted by sperm whales, is needed to make perfumes and is worth five times as much as gold. Greed strikes the men and there are betrayals and death. Terence Cooper again plays a villain, Grimes, and old hand Noel Purcell played Pat with Tony Thawnton playing Sykes. Also stars Eynon Evans as Deacon and Earl Cameron as Sam.
7	"The Slave Ship"	Terry Bishop	Jack Cousins	31 October 1956
Slaves take over a ship. Tempest captures them and, using money taken from the slaver, frees them to work on New Providence.
8	"Gunpowder Plot"	Leslie Arliss	Terence Moore	7 November 1956
Blackbeard steals the garrison's gunpowder supply and Tempest has to find a new supplier against the wishes of the naval authorities.
9	"The Ladies"	Pennington Richards	Roger McDougall	14 November 1956
Tempest hears of Blackbeard plan to board the vessel "Caroline" under a flag of truce to steal its cargo — Women!
10	"The Surgeon of Sangre Rojo"	Pennington Richards	Thomas A. Stockwell	21 November 1956
There is an epidemic on New Providence, and the only way to cure it is to kidnap a Spanish doctor while running a gauntlet of Spanish guns. Alec Mango again plays the villain whose rotting furs are full of typhus-carrying fleas.
11	"Before the Mast"	Ralph Smart	Roger McDougall	28 November 1956
Sailors on New Providence are press-ganged into the service of Spanish pirates under El Supremo (Ferdy Mayne), who is attacking supply ships. Tempest and Dickon go undercover to stop them, intercepting the "Felicity", which is bringing supplies to their island. Also stars Roger Snowdon as Rodrigues and Salvin Stewart as One-Eye.
12	"Dan Tempest and the Amazons"	Pennington Richards	Zachary Weiss	5 December 1956
French pirates attempt to sell seven women to New Providence. They take over Tempest's ship then beat him, but help is at hand from the women. Starring Joan Sims as chief of the "wimmin".
13	"The Articles of War"	Leslie Arliss	Peggy Phillips and Alan Moreland	12 December 1956
There is a Spanish presence in the area is stopping food reaching the island, so they are living on fish ... unlike the 9 Spanish prisoners who are eating meat under the articles of war. Armando, Gaff and Taffy decide to do something about it. There is success in that the Spanish ship is blown up and the promised food ship arrives, and failure in that now they now have 49 prisoners who are all eating better than they are. Stars Eric Pohlmann as Capt. Hernandez.
14	"The Hand of the Hawk"	Robert Day	Peter C. Hodgking	19 December 1956
Chantey Jack (Sid James) is a wandering minstrel (Sid James sings in this episode) who knew Dickon's father, Johnny Spencer. Jack is killed, but not before he has talked of "The Hawk", given Dickon a map and the others a song which tells where treasure is buried. Anthony Dawson plays Captain Flask.
15	"Marooned"	Leslie Arliss	Peter C. Hodgking	26 December 1956
Captain Clip West (Bill Owen), a pirate who even gives other pirates a bad name, is captured by Tempest after stealing from New Providence. West persuades the gullible Phineas Bunch (Willoughby Goddard) to release him. He and his men take over the ship and maroon Tempest and his men, but it is not long before the tables are turned again. Also stars Michael Rathborne as Look-out.
16	"Gentleman Jack and the Lady"	Leslie Arliss	Zachary Weiss	2 January 1957
Dan Tempest cheats French privateer Gentleman Jack (actually a woman, Anne Bonny, played by Hazel Court) out of a prize ship by a clever ruse. Bonny tries threats and tricks, then woman's wiles to get it back. She gets it in the end, minus its valuable cargo.
17	"Mr Beamish and the Hangman's Noose"	Pennington Richards	Terence Moore	9 January 1957
Van Brugh (Alec Mango) has put some bad words in about Acting Governor Beamish to England. Mainwaring (Lewis Gedge) is the new Governor and Admiral Bingham (Stringer Davis) has to decide whether Beamish is guilty of running an island full of pirates and should therefore be hanged. Mainwaring is strong on discipline and wants to change everything on the island, but Tempest believes that greed is his weakness and has a plan involving buried treasure that he believes will beat Mainwaring.
18	"Dead Man's Rock"	Robert Day	Peter C. Hodgkins	16 January 1957
The "Sultana" is beached so her hull can be careened (scraped). The Spaniards attack and Beamish is kidnapped by the evil Rodriguez (Richard Pasco) along with Dickon to try to make Beamish reveal the date of a secret convoy. Tempest, with his ship being overhauled, can offer no resistance.
19	"Blood Will Tell"	Robert Day	Zachary Weiss	23 January 1957
A trader's estate, Gresham Island, is at stake. The heir is missing and Piggott (Dawson France), whom Dickon recognises as a thief he once knew, is after it and Dickon knows he will be happy to trade with the enemy, Spain. The only way Tempest and Dickon can stop this is for Dickon to pretend to be an heir too. Lawyer Pym (Willoughby Goddard) must decide who is the real heir. Also stars John Dearth as Bellows.
20	"Dangerous Cargo"	Leslie Arliss	Zachary Weiss	30 January 1957
Captain Steele (Ivan Craig) delivers Lady Hilary Winrod (Sarah Lawson) to Dan Tempest so he can take her to Lord Winrod (Derek Nimmo) in Barbados, supposedly for a honeymoon. Captain Mendoza (Roger Delgado), a Spanish Captain, tries to kidnap her, and it is up to Tempest to get her to safety after he finds out the real purpose of her mission.
21	"The Return of Calico Jack"	Pennington Richards	Zachary Weiss and Basil Dawson	6 February 1957
The villainous Calico Jack (Brian Worth) turns up on New Providence. Tempest is away taking a valuable cargo to the Carolinas. After causing some trouble, Calico Jack learns of the cargo, and so plans to ambush Tempest using the "Sultana", hatching a plan with the equally evil Van Brugh. It's up to Beamish and Tempest's shipmates who have been left behind to stop him.
22	"Ghost Ship"	Robert Day	Peter C. Hodgking	13 February 1957
Dickon accidentally kills an albatross, a sign of bad luck. This continues when they find a derelict ship, which is taken in tow with Gaff and Dickon aboard, but the ship seems to be haunted by its original owner; the bloodthirsty pirate Captain Van Der Meer whom Taffy saw executed 15 years ago. Then Dickon disappears. Stars Colin Douglas as De Groot and Alfred Burke his mate.
23	"Conquistador"	Robert Day	Terence Moore and Basil Dawson	20 February 1957
The "Sultana" sports a jolly roger and her crew attacks ships and now threatens New Providence unless they pay them £10,000. The citizens call for Tempest and his crew to be shot, not knowing that they are prisoners on the "Sultana", which is now in the hands of Don Fernando Estaban (Roger Delgado) and his men who are pretending to be Tempest and her crew.
24	"Mother Doughty's Crew"	Pennington Richards	Zachary Weiss	27 February 1957
Gaff Guernsey is ready to get married, but finds out too late that his bride-to-be Betsy's (Anna Walmsley) mother, Mother Doughty (Ena Burrill), is with her five sons leading undercover pirate raids, which Tempest is trying to stop. Gaff is torn between his loyalty to Betsy and her mother and Tempest and his friends.
25	"Conquest of New Providence"	Leslie Arliss and Robert Day	Terence Moore	6 March 1957
While Tempest and his crew have been away, Don Estaban (Roger Delgado) has taken over New Providence. Tempest and Beamish's plans are hampered by traitors who betray them to the Spanish. Tempest is helped by Maria (Gillian Owen), who is Armando's wife.
26	"Hurricane"	Leslie Arliss	Terence Moore and Peggy Phillips	13 March 1957
A hurricane has caused great damage on New Providence. It has also blown a Spanish treasure ship onto rocks nearby, money for the war against England. It is up to Tempest and his men to rescue the gold with the help of local Indians/natives, persuaded by Armando who is one of them. Stars Ewen Solon as Spanish Admiral and Derek Sydney as Spanish Lieutenant.
27	"Cutlass Wedding"	Robert Day	Thomas A. Stockwel	20 March 1957
The women from Episode 12 are back. They are fed up because while the men like their company, no one wants to marry them, and unless someone does they are leaving. Taff has a narrow escape, then it's down to Sam Bassett, Beamish's number two man. The women, led by Abigail (Joan Sims), find out he is being pushed into marriage and decide to leave the island, only to wind up in the hands of slave traders led by La Forte (Paul Eddington).
28	"The Aztec Treasure"	Pennington Richards	Terence Moore	27 March 1957
A man named Martin (Thomas G. Duggan) asks Tempest to help him get hold of Aztec treasure (gold), which the Spanish are also after. Five start into the jungle but only two make it to the gold where the Aztecs capture Tempest and Martin. Also stars Frederick Treves as Quetzl.
29	"Prize of Andalusia"	Peter Maxwell	Basil Dawson and Zachary Weiss	3 April 1957
£20,000 worth of gold has been stolen from a merchant ship bound for the British navy and is in the hands of a greedy and wicked old Spanish Marquesa (Jean Cadell), who is going to cheat King Phillip out of it and keep it. Tempest and his men decide to get it back for England, but have to contend with the Marquesa's many tricks and with her men, Sebastian (Conrad Phillips) and Gomez (Bruno Barnabe).
30	"Dan Tempest Holds an Auction"	Peter Maxwell	Alan Moreland	10 April 1957
Dan Tempest takes a cargo to Charleston to sell. The "Company" (unnamed) are in charge there, make the rules and pay a third or less of what a cargo is worth, using strong-arm tactics on any who oppose them. Tempest decides to break their monopoly so all traders can get a fair price. Robert Perceval as Sir Charles Johnson, Ballard Berkeley as Rafton, Jane Griffiths as Paula Meadows, John Harvey as Lawyer Knox and Max Faulkner as Guard.
31	"The Spy Aboard"	Robert Day	Neil R. Collins	17 April 1957
Dan Tempest decides to bury his treasure for safekeeping, but he and his men are surprised by Pegleg, alias the bullet-proof Captain Finn (Richard Johnson) and his crew, who steal the treasure. Tempest realises that there must be a spy on the "Sultana" and sets about planting a spy in Pegleg's crew. Stars Wilfrid Brambell as Old Man, also John Salew as Cookie, Danny Green as Noah and Jack Hedley as Raikes.
32	"Flip and Jenny"	Peter Maxwell	Neil R. Collins	24 April 1957
Two children, Flip (Peter Soule) and Jenny (Jane Asher), are stowaways. Their father Purdy, (Colin Douglas), an indentured servant to Lord Hinch (Robert Hardy), has gone to jail for demanding that his children be educated and for refusing to work until they are. To solve their problems, Tempest lets himself and his men be captured. Also stars Seymour Green as Constable Herridge.
33	"Indian Fighters"	Peter Maxwell	Neil R. Collins	1 May 1957
The "Sultana" is taking "Understandable Perkins" (Ronan O'Casey) back to Charleston. Perkins and his fellow Indian fighters have gotten rid of the Indians from around Charleston, making the land worth four times as much, and they refuse to pay the new rent. First, Tempest and his men go to jail and then Perkins, then they hatch a plan to bring the Indians back so the Indian fighters are needed again. Also stars Edmund Warwick as Magistrate Mortimer and Max Faulkner as Servant.
34	"Mistress Higgins' Treasure"	Pennington Richards	Thomas A. Stockwel	8 May 1957
The "Sultana" is delivering tax-free farm implements to Virginia because they are too expensive to buy locally, but they find the crops have already been harvested. However, they have been stolen so the farmers have lost everything, until schoolmistress Higgins (Adrienne Corri) helps them find where the crops went. Howard Pays as Pennington, boys – Barry Fennell and Claude Kingston, girl – Jane Asher.
35	"To the Rescue"	Peter Maxwell	Phillis Miller	15 May 1957
Major Percy (Ewen Solon) is offering a miserly price for a tobacco crop on behalf of the Crown. Louis Brion (Andre Charisse) needs a good price, and Tempest's girlfriend Paula (Jane Griffiths) persuades him to take the cargo where he can get a good price for it, but in doing so they are discovered and the cargo impounded. Percy now has Captain Barker (Michael Golden) take the crop to London for sale for him. If Tempest tries to stop him, he will be accused of piracy, but Tempest has a plan.
36	"The Decoy"	Pennington Richards	Albert G. Ruben	22 May 1957
The "Sultana" comes on a woman, Rebecca (Virginia Maskell), in a rowing boat. Tempest suspects she is a decoy to lure them into the hands of the terrible Turk (Marne Maitland), but she insists that the Turk is holding her husband, George Bradbury (Derek Waring), captive. Tempest decides to turn the tables and use the woman as a decoy against the Turk.
37	"Instrument of War"	Bernard Knowles	Peter Rossano	29 May 1957
Tempest and his crew with the help of Dougal (John Harvey) are trying to get David MacGregor (Charles Houston) off of Prisoner's Island (where they have been transported to) to Port Royal where he can plead the Scot's case. Marsh (Alfred Burke) is in charge and intends on hanging David. The "Instruments of War" are bagpipes used to call other Scots to battle. Also stars Andrew Keir as David's father (The Laird), Gay Cameron as Sheila, his girlfriend and Dennis Edwards as Second Guard.
38	"Pirate Honour"	Peter Maxwell	Marion Myers	5 June 1957
Captain Drewitt was murdered and now his wife (Ilona Ference) and son, Edwin (Michael Caridia) must manage as best as they can. But Major Langley (Brian Oulton) is after the Captain's treasure and sets the evil Black Bart (Alex Scott) on Tempest when he tries to help them.
39	"Printer's Devil"	Bernard Knowles	Terence Moore	12 June 1957
Under the guise of doing necessary work, Josiah Parkerhouse (Miles Malleson) has been printing a news-sheet telling the truth about Sir Joplin James (Noel Coleman) and his cronies when Tempest saves him from being arrested. Tempest lets Parkerhouse continue his printing of the truth aboard the "Sultana", despite a Customs & Excise officer being aboard and then, with the help of a woman who sells bread and such, distributes it to the people on the island, and it isn't long before Sir James is kicked out of his office. Also starred Maxwell Shaw as Sharp, Jean Bloor as Mrs Miles (baker), Walter Horsburgh as Magistrate and Dennis Edwards as an Officer.

== Music ==
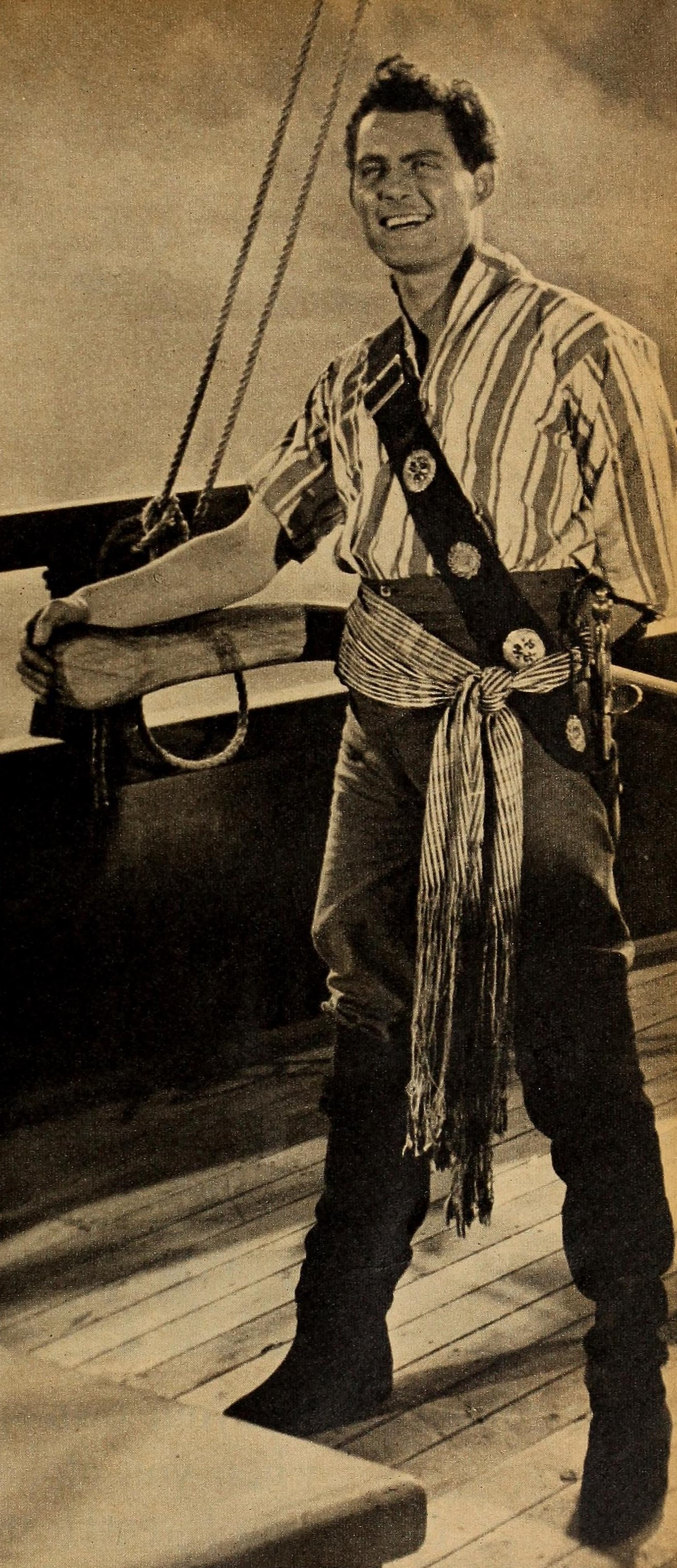
Robert Shaw as Captain Dan Tempest

The show's ending theme contained the chorus:

Let's go a-roving, a-roving across the ocean
Oh, let's go a-roving and join the buccaneers!
We'll find adventure, adventure across the ocean
Oh, we'll find adventure and join the buccaneers!

Sea shanties and traditional songs were incorporated into the show. Early episodes begin with sailors singing "Blow, Ye Winds, in the Morning," an anachronistic American whaling song. The second episode, "The Raiders," is the only episode to use "The Maid of Amsterdam" as its ending theme. Other songs performed in the show include:

- "Drunken Sailor" (in "Printer's Devil")
- "Haul Away, Joe" (in various episodes including "Dan Tempest's War with Spain")
- "Johnny Come Down to Hilo" (in "Mother Doughty's Crew")
- "O Shenandoah" (in "Gentleman Jack and the Lady")
- "Spanish Ladies" (in "The Ladies")
- "Shake Her, Johnny, Shake Her" (in "Hurricane" and "Flip and Jenny")
- "Venezuela" by John Jacob Niles (in "Mother Doughty's Crew")

== DVD and book releases ==
Dell Comics Four Color #800 was based on the show. The Buccaneers (1958) was a Whitman “Big Little Book”: 276 pages half of them are Russ Manning illustrations, the rest are a story written by Alice Sankey. The adventure story sends Captain Dan Tempest (a buccaneer, or privateer, unofficially serving the English king) and his crew of ex-pirates, after the notorious Blackbeard, and Dan's ship “Sultana” battles with Blackbeard’s famous ship, “Queen Anne's Revenge”. The story includes a treasure map and a treasure, a ship's boy and his cat.

Mill Creek Entertainment released the complete series in Region 1 on 15 August 2006. This release has been discontinued and is now out of print.

Network Distributing Home Entertainment (under licence from Granada Ventures Ltd) released the complete series in Region 2 on June 1, 2007.

On 19 August 2008, Timeless Media Group released a 3-disc best-of set that features 30 episodes of the series.
