= Sword of Freedom =

1958 British TV drama adventure series

- Created by: Hannah Weinstein
- Starring: Edmund Purdom; Adrienne Corri; Roland Bartrop
- Theme music composer: Eric Spear
- Composer: Eric Spear
- Country of origin: United Kingdom
- Original language: English
- No. of series: 2
- No. of episodes: 39 (list of episodes)

Production
- Executive producer: Hannah Weinstein
- Producer: Sidney Cole
- Cinematography: Ken Hodges; Michael Reed
- Running time: 25 minutes
- Production companies: Sapphire Films; ITC Productions

Original release
- Network: ITV
- Release: 21 February 1958 – 21 March 1961

Sword of Freedom is a 1958 drama adventure series for a family audience. Like several of its predecessors (most notably The Adventures of Robin Hood), it was produced by Sapphire Films for ITC Entertainment and fitted into the same swashbuckler genre as previous productions. It ran for thirty-nine half-hour monochrome episodes.

== Plot ==
Marco del Monte is a young Republican artist living in sixteenth century Renaissance Florence. The city is ruled by the tyrant Duke de Medici. Marco's girlfriend is Angelica, a beautiful former pickpocket. Sandro is Marco's friend and confidant. Machiavelli is the Duke's advisor, and Captain Rodrigo is the head of the Medici forces. The series depicts the struggles of the Republicans to combat the attempts of the Duke to strengthen his position and make himself a dictator.

== Cast and characters ==
- Edmund Purdom as Marco del Monte
- Adrienne Corri as Angelica
- Roland Bartrop as Sandro
- Martin Benson as the Duke de Medici
- Kenneth Hyde as Machiavelli

=== Recurring characters ===
- Derek Sydney as Captain Rodrigo
- Monica Stevenson as Francesca de Medici (De Medici's sister)
- Andrew Keir Edward Atienza as Leonardo da Vinci
- Kevin Stoney as Niccolo the innkeeper

Guest stars included Joan Plowright, Peter Wyngarde, Charles Gray, Paul Eddington, Brian Nissen, Patrick Troughton, Kenneth Williams and Roger Delgado.

== Episodes ==
Airdate is for ATV Midlands ITV regions varied date and order. Production order as the Network DVD.

Filmed during 1957–1958. Production Nos 101, 117–139 at Walton Studios, Walton on Thames, England and 102–108 at Alliance Film Studios, Twickenham, England

=== Series 1 (1958) ===
No.	Title	Directed by	Written by	Original release date	Prod. code
1	"Francesca"	Terry Bishop	Lewis Hunt	21 February 1958	101
The Duke de Medici, seeking to forge an alliance with the Duke of Granada promises the hand of his young sister, Francesca, in marriage to the Spanish nobleman. Marco and, indeed, Francesca herself have other ideas. Stars Ferdy Mayne, Reginald Beckwith played Sandro in this episode and Bryan Coleman.
2	"The Suspects"	Terence Fisher	George Baxt	28 February 1958	115
Marco, Sandro, Bosti, Varenza, Sebastiano, and Procelli meet in Marco's studio to discuss the distribution of republican pamphlets but one of the men is a traitor. Stars Leonard Sachs, Charles Gray and Basil Dignam.
3	"The Sicilian"	Terry Bishop	Samuel B. West	7 March 1958	102
Marco enlists the pickpocket Angelica to recover republican money cheated from Sandro by a cardsharp. Stars Peter Wyngarde.
4	"Portrait in Emerald Green"	Bernard Knowles	Leighton Reynolds	14 March 1958	106
Master butcher Guilo Basti opposes a tax levied by de Medici who orders Rodrigo to kill him. Marco is painting a portrait of Basti's beautiful young wife Lucrezia. Rodrigo decides to create a situation whereas Basti believes that Marco and Lucrezia are lovers and Lucrezia sees a way to rid herself of a husband. Stars John Le Mesurier, June Rodney and Dennis Edwards.
5	"Forgery in Red Chalk"	Terry Bishop	Leighton Reynolds	21 March 1958	121
De Medici is determined to get hold of plans of an under the sea machine designed by Leonardo da Vinci and holds da Vinci's mute servant hostage. Marco has to forge a de Vinci sketch. Stars Andrew Keir.
6	"Vespucci"	Anthony Squire	Michael Connor	28 March 1958	122
Captain Amerigo Vespucci anxious to raise money from de Medici for another voyage has to produces Little Fawn, a native of the strange new land, who has been kidnapped and Marco has to find her. Stars Patrick Troughton, John Gabriel and Luciana Paoluzzi.
7	"The Woman in the Picture"	Anthony Squire	Michael Connor	4 April 1958	120
Marco battles to stop Leonardo da Vinci's Mona Lisa being sold by de Medici to Count Ugo. Stars Andrew Keir, Joan Plowright and John Arnatt.
8	"Caterina"	Bernard Knowles	Robert Westerby	11 April 1958	104
Baglione, General of de Medici's Guard, wants a portrait of his beautiful daughter Caterina. Marco expecting the commission is both annoyed and dismayed when Sandro tells him that another artist is to do the portrait. Stars William Lucas, George Murcell, Neville Jason and Howard Lang.
9	"The Duke"	Terry Bishop	Robert Westerby	18 April 1958	107
The taxes de Medici has imposed on the merchants of Florence are causing unrest, which may lead to rebellion so he hires Spanish mercenaries from the Duke of Ferrara who will not be bothered about killing the citizens. De Medici plans to marry his sister Francesca to the Duke to the horror of Marco. Stars Richard Pasco.
10	"The Eye of the Artist"	Terry Bishop	William Templeton	25 April 1958	108
A courier carrying a message to the republicans of Florence is ambushed and killed by one of de Medici's agents. The message was to be delivered to Orsini whose beautiful young wife Lisa is having her portrait painted by Marco del Monte. Stars John Carson and Paul Eddington.
11	"The Bracelet"	Terry Bishop	Robert Westerby	2 May 1958	112
Francesca is thrown from her horse losing her bracelet. Marco goes to her aid but is sent away by Paolo, the worthless nephew of Count Orlando. Marco discovers that Francesca's bracelet has become attached to his cloak and is attacked when he tries to return it. Stars Ronald Hines, Ronald Leigh-Hunt
12	"The Hero"	Bernard Knowles	Robert Westerby	9 May 1958	105
Marco is incensed when a hero of the revolution, General Ferrucci, accepts a pardon from de Medici. Stars John Robinson and John Bailey.
13	"The Value of Paper"	Terry Bishop	Michael Connor	16 May 1958	118
Marco's friend Umberto has written a treatise on republicanism, which would prove dangerous to him if de Medici were to find out. Umberto is parchment maker and forbids his daughter to marry Luigi, a rival printer and paper maker. Stars Jennifer Jayne and Michael Peake.
14	"Choice of Weapons"	Terry Bishop	Samuel B. West	23 May 1958	103
De Medici attempts to impose a tax on the Guild of Painters only to be foiled by Marco. De Medici then challenges Marco to a duel and Marco accepts only to find that the cowardly Duke has no intention of fighting the duel himself. Stars Charles Gray, Geoffrey Bayldon, Michael Peake and John Dearth.
15	"Marriage of Convenience"	Terry Bishop	William Templeton	30 May 1958	117
Girolamo and Zanobi are two of the most powerful families in Italy. Their houses are to be united by the marriage of their children. The couple have never met and so Marco is hired to paint a portrait of the girl causing him a dilemma as the girl has a scar on her cheek. Stars Anthony Nicholls, Edwin Richfield and Maurice Kaufmann.
16	"The Bell"	Terence Fisher	Michael Connor	6 June 1958	114
Marco and Sandro are annoyed when Sandro's uncle Beppo, the bellringer, has been prevented by de Medici's guards from ringing The Liberty Bell in defiance of de Medici orders. Marco is determined to ring the bell before midnight but needs Francesca de Medici help. Stars Wilfrid Brambell and John Dearth.
17	"The Tower"	Terence Fisher	George Baxt	13 June 1958	109
The Duke de Medici has commissioned designs for the decorations he hopes will impress the Duke of Valencia, but he has no intention of paying for them. Marco organises the artists to band together and demonstrate from the highest tower in Florence to shame de Medici into paying. Stars Patrick Troughton
18	"The Ship"	Bernard Knowles	William Templeton	20 June 1958	111
Shipwrecked Stephano, a merchant, tries to raise money to build another ship with money from The Duke of Urbino but de Medici is trying to borrow money from him to take control of the Florence wool trade. Marco plans to help Stephano and thwart de Medici's plans. Stars Andrew Cruickshank, Geoffrey Bayldon, Joseph O'Conor, Patricia Burke and Peter Asher.
19	"The Besieged Duchess"	Terry Bishop	George Baxt	11 July 1958	128
The Duke de Medici orders Machiavelli, his chief adviser, to negotiate with the eccentric Duchess Di Crespi for her derelict castle necessary for the city's defence. Marco helps Machiavelli to appease the Duchess. Stars Martita Hunt and Tom Clegg.
20	"The Pagan Venus"	Anthony Squire	Robert Westerby	18 July 1958	119
De Medici needs money to buy cannon to strengthen his grip on the people and confiscates pagan art and antiquities like the Pagan Venus to sell to the Duke of Milan. Marco decides to help the art dealers whose livelihood is threatened. Stars Leonard Sachs, Bill Fraser, John Carson and Alan Rowe.
21	"The Slave"	Terry Bishop	George Baxt	1 August 1958	113
Disturbed by news of the arrival of a new batch of slaves Marco hatches a plan to free, Safiye, a Turkish Princess. Angelica is jealous of the beautiful girl and gives the game away to slavemaster Di Santi. Stars Thomas Heathcote, Ziki Arnot.
22	"The School"	Terry Bishop	William Templeton	8 August 1958	123
Marco's friend the printer of a secret republican manifesto has his shop smashed up by de Medici's men and a spy is suspected at the school his son attends. Marco takes a job there as a teacher. Stars Patrick Troughton and Kenneth Williams.
23	"The Ambassador"	Peter Maxwell	William Templeton	15 August 1958	125
De Medici is negotiating a loan from the English government to Marco's dismay and Angelica decides to intercept the English ambassador on his way to Florence and take him to Marco to learn of de Medici's tyranny. Stars Patrick Troughton and Peter Hammond
24	"The Lion and the Mouse"	Anthony Squire	George Baxt	22 August 1958	126
The price of Alum under de Medici's control is rising causing the price of paint and cosmetics to soar and when Marco's attempt to liberate a shipload of Turkish Alum is foiled the women of Florence deprived of expensive cosmetics decide to take action with Marco's prompting. Stars Jean Kent
25	"Angelica's Past"	Coby Ruskin	Michael Connor	29 August 1958	127
Virelli, Angelica's criminal mentor returns to claim her and fearful for Marco's safety agrees to go with him and return to her life of pickpocketing and face a trial from the guild of thieves. Stars Roger Delgado, Richard Wordsworth and John Barron.
26	"Cristina"	Coby Ruskin	Michael Connor	5 September 1958	129
Cristina, a girl who 8 years earlier Marco had loved and planned to marry but who jilted him returns to Florence needing protection from the Duke of Sienna's assassins who are after her husband. Marco's feelings for her lead him to plot with the assassins. Stars Julia Arnall George A. Cooper and George Murcell.
27	"Strange Intruder"	Peter Maxwell	George Baxt	12 September 1958	130
De Medici plans an alliance with the French Bourbons and wants his sister Francesca to marry the Count Rene d' Albert, a master swordsman, but she seems strangely reluctant because she has her own plans to dispose of her brother even if it kills Marco whom Machiavelli wants to influence Francesca away from any marriage. Stars William Russell

=== Series 2 (1960–1961) ===
No.	Title	Directed by	Written by	Original release date	Prod. code
28	"The Primavera"	Peter Maxwell	A. M. Caiddon	11 October 1960	131
De Medici's bank vaults are empty and Marco is commissioned by de Medici to paint Francesca wearing the Primavera, a priceless jewel she will inherit on her eighteenth birthday. When the jewel is stolen Marco is accused of theft.
29	"The Marionettes"	Peter Maxwell	William Templeton	25 October 1960	133
The chief minister of the Duke of Padua is fatally wounded but before he dies passes a message to puppetmaster Poggio of a plot by de Medici to assassinate his Duke and to inform Marco Del Monte. Arriving in Florence he is arrested and Marco has to organise a children's protest to receive the message. Stars Charles Lamb, Basil Dignam, Jane Asher and Derren Nesbitt
30	"Vendetta"	Peter Maxwell	Michael Connor	8 November 1960	135
Marco kills a Corsican de Medici spy in a duel and de Medici sends word to his family to avenge his death. Lorenzo, his younger brother, arrives to kill Marco with a poison-tipped sword supplied by de Medici. Stars Tim Seely.
31	"Serenade in Red"	Terry Bishop	Leighton Reynolds	22 November 1960	116
Marco has a student, Tonio, a nephew of de Medici who is in love with Laura whose father is an enemy of de Medici. When Angelica arranges a liaison it backfires bringing danger to Tonio and Laura's father when de Medici orders their death. Stars Tony Wright, Alec Mango and Jocelyn Britton.
32	"Chart of Gold"	Antony Squire	Leighton Reynolds	6 December 1960	124
Cosimo, Marco's friend, returns from sea after ten years but things have changed with a son who does not remember him and a wife having an affair with Captain Rodrigo. A chart he carries leading to Eldorado puts his and Marco's lives in danger. Stars Richard Leech, Richard O'Sullivan, Daphne Anderson and John Dearth.
33	"A Game of Chance"	Coby Ruskin	George Baxt	20 December 1960	132
Florence and the de Medici bank are in financial trouble and de Medici organises a crooked lottery to be won by a reluctant republican doctor who owes him money. Marco decides to help the doctor and with Francesca's help thwart de Medici.
34	"The Reluctant Duke"	Coby Ruskin	William Templeton	3 January 1961	134
After the Duke of Teano survives an assassination attempt, he disappears believed dead but his sister Prospera asks Marco to look for him in a troupe of clowns but she is also his heir. Stars Murray Hayne, Norma Parnell, Bryan Coleman and Donald Morley.
35	"Who is Felicia"	Peter Maxwell	George Baxt	17 January 1961	136
Marco and Sebastiano are expecting a courier with news that will affect a proposed uprising of republicans that will depose de Medici but the only person it could be is an injured girl who has lost her memory and a man claiming she is his ward. Stars Zena Walker, Andrew Keir and Walter Gotell.
36	"Violetta"	Peter Maxwell	George Baxt	31 January 1961	137
Violetta has been sitting for her portrait and when Marco delivers the finished portrait to her guardian he finds him murdered and himself accused. The only proof of his innocence is a letter that cannot be used and only Violetta can confirm the contents but instead she condemns Marco. Stars Jane Downs, Alan Rowe, Michael Peake and Llewellyn Rees.
37	"The Assassin"	Peter Maxwell	Sidney Cole and Albert G. Ruben	28 February 1961	139
When Otello, a professional assassin, saves Marco's life, a strained friendship develops. Employed by de Medici, Otello is troubled to find Marco is the target he is contracted to kill. A contract that cannot be broken. Stars Bill Owen.
38	"Adriana"	Peter Maxwell	George Baxt	14 March 1961	138
De Medici employs Adriana to supervise his sister Francesca who he considers is out of control. Ingratiating herself with Francesca, Adriana plans to marry de Medici by discrediting her but Marco who is painting a mural at the palace has other ideas. Stars Noelle Middleton.
39	"Alessandro"	Peter Cotes	George Baxt	21 March 1961	110
The penniless Marco is relying on the St. Luke's Day Exhibition of Art as a means of making money. When he meets Alessandro whose ambition is to become a great artist, Marco sees a way of helping the boy while helping himself but Alessandro's uncle does not approve. Stars Michael Bryant and Colin Douglas.

== Music ==
The theme music to Sword of Freedom was composed by Eric Spear, who would later compose the theme for Coronation Street a couple of years later.

== DVD ==
Network released the series on a 5-disc region 2 DVD set in June 2010.
