= The Four Just Men (TV series) =

1959 British TV drama series

- Genre: Drama
- Created by: Edgar Wallace
- Starring: Dan Dailey; Richard Conte; Jack Hawkins; Vittorio De Sica
- Theme music composer: Francis Chagrin
- Composer: Francis Chagrin
- Country of origin: United Kingdom
- Original language: English
- No. of series: 1
- No. of episodes: 39 (list of episodes)

Production
- Executive producer: Hannah Fisher
- Producers: Sidney Cole; Jud Kinberg
- Cinematography: Ken Hodges; Harry Waxman; Peter Hennessy; Gerald Moss
- Running time: 25 minutes
- Production company: Sapphire Films

Original release
- Network: ITV
- Release: 17 September 1959 – 17 August 1960

The Four Just Men is a 1959 television series produced by Sapphire Films for ITC Entertainment. It was broadcast for one series of 39 half-hour monochrome episodes.

== Plot ==
The series, based on a sequence of novels by Edgar Wallace including a 1905 novel titled The Four Just Men, presents the adventures of four men who first meet while Allied soldiers in Italy during the Second World War, tasked with the dangerous job to blow up a bridge behind enemy lines.

In England in 1959 the men are contacted by telegram by their commanding officer, Colonel Cyril Bacon. to meet again. Col. Bacon died a week before, but has left a recorded message for the men. He has also left a will that his money be used by the four men to fight for justice and against tyranny. They operate from different countries: Jeff Ryder is a professor of law at Columbia University in New York City, Tim Collier is an American reporter based in Paris, Ben Manfred is a crusading independent MP who works from London, and Ricco Poccari is an Italian hotelier based in Rome. Their reputation as the "Four Just Men" is well known.

The series is unusual in having the four main actors appear alternately (except in the first episode); one or occasionally two makes a brief appearance in each other's episode, often using a telephone. This rolling format, which could be useful to the stars, was later borrowed by other US drama series particularly in the 1960s such as The Rogues (1964-5) and The Name of the Game (1968-1971).

== Cast and characters ==
Richard Conte, Dan Dailey, Jack Hawkins and Vittorio De Sica

- Richard Conte as Jeff Ryder
- Dan Dailey as Tim Collier
- Jack Hawkins as Ben Manfred
- Vittorio De Sica as Ricco Poccari

Each character had an assistant:

- June Thorburn as Vicky, Ryder's law student assistant
- Honor Blackman as Nicole, Collier's French girlfriend and secretary
- Andrew Keir as Jock, Manfred's manservant and best friend
- Lisa Gastoni as Giulia, Poccari's secretary
- Robert Rietti as Francesco, Poccari's butler

Guest stars included Judi Dench, Alan Bates, Leonard Sachs, Patrick Troughton, Donald Pleasence, Richard Johnson, Ronald Howard, Basil Dignam, Roger Delgado, Fenella Fielding, Charles Gray, and Frank Thornton (who appeared in more roles than anyone else).

== Production ==
At the time, The Four Just Men was the most ambitious film series yet made for British TV. It was produced by Sapphire Films at Walton Studios, and on location in Britain, France, and Italy. None of its four stars had previously been cast as regulars in a television series. Indeed, only Dan Dailey would go on to play another regular role on series television in The Governor & J.J.

Filming of the 39 episodes, each 25 minutes long, began during January 1959, and lasted for five months, using up to seven units in the studio or on location, and producing two or three episodes simultaneously.

John Schlesinger was credited as exterior unit or second unit director on a number of episodes.

== Episodes ==
Airdate is for ATV Midlands. ITV regions varied date and order.

Each story featured one star and, often, brief appearances by the others.
DD = Dan Dailey
JH = Jack Hawkins
RC = Richard Conte
VS = Vittorio De Sica

No. overall	Star	Title	Directed by	Written by	Original release date
1	All	"The Battle of the Bridge"	Basil Dearden	Gene L. Coon; Story by Miriam Geiger and Don Castle	17 September 1959
Four men who last met in battle, during the Allied invasion of Italy in 1943, are reunited by the death of their former commanding officer to hear a message recorded soon before his death. He appeals to them to form a quartet dedicated to fighting injustice and tyranny with a large sum of donated money. They agree and become the Four Just Men. Features Anthony Bushell and Jack May.
2	DD	"The Prime Minister"	Don Chaffey	Oliver Skene; Story by Alec Coppel	24 September 1959
A Middle Eastern prime minister, on his way to the United Nations in New York via Rome and Paris, is protected by the Four Just Men when he becomes an assassination target. Features Peter Illing, Maurice Kaufmann and Frank Thornton (uncredited). Jack Hawkins and Vittorio de Sica briefly appear.
3	JH	"Village of Shame"	Basil Dearden	Lindsay Galloway	1 October 1959
A friend of Manfred is murdered in a small French village, Saint Paul, after discovering a German sympathiser from the Second World War in the village. Manfred goes to the village to investigate and finds the whole village against him, but he is determined to bring the murderer to justice and expose the traitor. Features John Gabriel, George Pastell, Paul Stassino, Malou Pantera and Robert Cawdron. Dan Dailey briefly appears.
4	RC	"The Judge"	Harry Watt	Marc Brandel	8 October 1959
When a young woman is charged with the murder of her husband by poisoning, the evidence of the popular local doctor is accepted without question by everyone except her lawyer, who was once a student taught by Ryder. Ryder is asked for help and finds himself at the mercy of an angry mob and a doctor with his sense of justice. Features Kay Callard, James Dyrenforth, Peter Dyneley, Naomi Chance and Robert Ayres. Jack Hawkins briefly appears.
5	VS	"The Crying Jester"	William Fairchild	William Fairchild	15 October 1959
At an Italian art dealer's shop, Poccari takes a liking to a painting from Algeria, knowing it is not genuine; when an innocent man is mistaken for him and murdered, he suspects the painting may have a valuable secret. Features Betty McDowall, Dudley Foster, Lee Montague, Leonard Sachs, Frank Thornton, David Cole and George Pravda.Dan Dailey and Honor Blackman briefly appear.
6	DD	"The Beatniques"	Don Chaffey	Wilton Schiller; Story by Alec Coppel	22 October 1959
In Cannes to cover the Film Festival, Collier is approached by a famous movie actress who is being blackmailed when her jewellery box was stolen when she was given a ride by three French beatniks; the box contained incriminating love letters in a false bottom. Features Cec Linder, Delphi Lawrence, David Graham, Malou Pantera, Oscar Quitak, Frank Thornton, Max Faulkner and Dennis Edwards. Jack Hawkins briefly appears.
7	JH	"The Deserter"	Basil Dearden	John Baines	29 October 1959
A young British Army officer, on active service in an island colony under martial law, goes missing for six weeks and is sent for court-martial for desertion. His mother appeals to Manfred for help, but when the officer offers no defence and is found guilty, Manfred suspects there is more to the case than is apparent. Features Richard Johnson, Ronald Howard, Melissa Stribling, Basil Dignam, Neil Hallett and Harold Goodwin. Dan Dailey briefly appears.
8	RC	"Dead Man's Switch"	Harry Watt	Wilton Schiller	5 November 1959
The father of a young Puerto Rican, stabbed in a brawl at a boys' club, decides to take revenge; he holds hostage a racist and a troublemaker—author of a free newsletter—by holding a grenade with the pin taken out. Ryder has to risk his life to prevent further tragedy. Features Richard Pasco, Bill Nagy, Mary Barclay, Margaret Wolfit and Frank Thornton (uncredited). Dan Dailey briefly appears.
9	VS	"The Night of the Precious Stone"	William Fairchild	Guy Morgan	12 November 1959
Organising a charity ball at his hotel for his Naples boys' club, Poccari receives a warning from the other Just Men that jewel thieves are joining forces to steal the priceless "Empress Diamonds". The police arrest every member of the gang except one, whose identity remains unknown. Features Brenda De Banzie, Patrick Troughton, Bruce Boa, Gordon Sterne and Robert Rietti. Richard Conte, Jack Hawkins, and Dan Dailey briefly appear, the only episode other than the first in which all four main actors appear.
10	DD	"The Deadly Capsule"	Compton Bennett	Jan Read; Story by Oliver Skene and Samuel B. West	19 November 1959
Collier investigates the circumstances surrounding the death, on the road from Grenoble to Paris, of a famous atomic scientist who was working on food preservation using a deadly radioactive capsule; the capsule has disappeared and may have been used by children. Features Elwyn Brook-Jones, Frederick Schrecker and Lily Kann. Jack Hawkins briefly appears.
11	JH	"Their Man in London"	Basil Dearden	Leon Griffiths	26 November 1959
An opponent of the Guatarican dictatorship is murdered in London, Manfred believes the killer is hiding under diplomatic immunity in the Guatarican embassy, but on meeting the suspect's English girlfriend, realises he might be a prisoner. Features June Thorburn, Mark Dignam and Maurice Kaufmann. Richard Conte briefly appears.
12	VS	"Maya"	William Fairchild	William Fairchild	10 December 1959
Princess Maya is the fun-loving younger sister of the King of Kawlat, wasting her riches on her boyfriend Bruno. Bruno, in debt, is blackmailed by rebels planning a coup; when Ryder arrives in Rome to inform Poccari that the King has been killed, Poccari realises the next target is the next-in-line to be Queen, the reluctant Maya. Features Mai Zetterling, Peter Illing and Michael Peake. Richard Conte and Vittorio De Sica briefly appear.
13	JH	"National Treasure"	Basil Dearden	Owen Holder; Story by Janet Green	24 December 1959
A dying millionaire confesses to Manfred that a painting by Rembrandt in a famous London art gallery is a forgery and that he has the original and wants Manfred to return it secretly. Manfred agrees, intending to use the forgery to flush out the original thieves. Features William Lucas, Richard Wordsworth, Toke Townley, Patricia Hayes and Frank Thornton.
14	RC	"Panic Button"	Anthony Bushell	Marianne Foster and Samuel B. West	31 December 1959
The daughter of a research scientist appeals to Ryder for help when in a laboratory accident her father is exposed to a harmless amount of radiation and the people in an upstate New York town, Fairview, where he lives and works believe that they will be contaminated and die. Features Paul Carpenter, Sheila Gallagher, Ewen Solon, Jess Conrad, Warren Mitchell and Oliver Reed (uncredited). Dan Dailey briefly appears.
15	VS	"The Man with the Golden Touch"	Basil Dearden	Louis Marks; Story by Jan Read	7 January 1960
A millionaire's urn, to be auctioned to provide funds for a boys' home for the poor of Naples, is stolen. Pietro, a former juvenile delinquent, is suspected of the crime; he absconds to Poccari, who believes the boy to be innocent of the crime and determines to find the real thief with the help of the urchins of Naples. Features Richard O'Sullivan, Philip Latham, Brewster Mason, Ewen Solon and Frank Thornton. Richard Conte briefly appears.
16	DD	"Marie"	Don Chaffey	Gene Levitt and Louis Marks	14 January 1960
Marie is an Algerian girl in Paris with no papers; Collier stops her from committing suicide, but before he can question her she disappears. Determined to find her, he discovers from Manfred in London that her family was killed by Algerian extremists and that she might be responsible. Features Perlita Neilson, Alec Mango, Peggy Ann Clifford, Frank Thornton, Julian Sherrier and Michael Peake. Jack Hawkins briefly appears.
17	JH	"The Survivor"	Basil Dearden	Marc Brandel	21 January 1960
Manfred is given a list of persons who are Nazi sympathisers, trying to gain positions of authority, in Germany by a former concentration camp survivor. MI5 has its own opinions on the survivor, and when Collier reveals the list is phoney, Manfred has to discover the man's motives and intentions. Features Donald Pleasence, Patricia Burke, Allan Cuthbertson, Frank Thornton and Kevin Stoney. Dan Dailey briefly appears.
18	RC	"The Discovery"	Don Chaffey	Marc Brandel	28 January 1960
An unlicensed Italian doctor is charged with murder when he gives an elderly patient an unauthorised drug. Known to Poccari and Collier, Ryder defends the doctor by desperate and unusual means. Features John Gabriel, Lionel Murton, Gordon Sterne, Budd Knapp and Helena Hughes. Vittorio De Sica and Dan Dailey briefly appears.
19	VS	"The Rietti Group"	William Fairchild	William Fairchild	4 February 1960
Two wartime Allied paratroopers, staying at Poccari's hotel, inform him that there was a traitor in an Italian partisan group of which he was a member. Poccari, knowing death awaits the traitor, agrees to help them at a reunion meeting of "The Rietti Group" at the hotel. Features Geoffrey Keen, Simon Lack, Ronan O'Casey, Robert Rietti and Olaf Pooley. Richard Conte briefly appears.
20	DD	"The Man in the Road"	Don Chaffey	George Slavin and Samuel B. West	11 February 1960
Travelling from the French Alps to Paris, an American ambassador's wife kills a cyclist; when she is blackmailed, Collier suspects a plot to discredit her husband. Features Charles Gray, Patrick Barr, Simone Lovell, Frank Thornton and Jane Asher. Richard Conte briefly appears.
21	JH	"Money to Burn"	Basil Dearden	Jan Read	17 February 1960
Lady Barling, wife of Sir Walter Barling, owner of respected banknote printers Barlings, asks Manfred for help when her husband is tricked into printing five million pesos for a South American republic that will be used to debase the currency of the country and cause a coup. Features Charles Gray, Alan Tilvern, Ian Hunter, Helena Pickard, Wolf Frees and Frank Thornton. Richard Conte briefly appears.
22	RC	"Crack-Up"	Anthony Bushell	Louis Marks; Story by Lee Leob	24 February 1960
A private aeroplane carrying five million dollars in stolen bullion is lost without trace in the Canadian wilderness. Five years later the aeroplane is found, and Ryder is asked by the pilot's widow to prove that her husband was innocent of the theft. Features Robert Shaw, Paul Eddington, Delena Kidd and Charles Irwin. Jack Hawkins briefly appears.
23	DD	"The Miracle of St. Phillipe"	Don Chaffey	Jan Read and Louis Marks; Story by Barbara Hammer	9 March 1960
The theft from a French village of a sacred relic, the Samaritan Cup, and the murder of the village's mayor comes to the attention of Collier, who has been brought there by Nicole for the annual festival. A man who has confessed to every crime in the village for the last six months is dismissed as a madman by the police. Features Paul Daneman, John Gabriel, Richard Caldicot and Margaret Tyzack. Vittorio De Sica briefly appears.
24	VS	"The Slaver"	Harry Watt	Lindsay Galloway	30 March 1960
Poccari finds a highly organised slave market based in Rome when Ryder asks him to look after an American journalist, Dexter, who is due to arrive in Rome to give evidence at a United Nations committee. Dexter has vanished, and Poccari is aided by Rosalina who knows both Dexter and the chief of the slave ring. Features Charles Gray, Roger Delgado, Ronan O'Casey, Anthony Jacobs and June Rodney. Richard Conte briefly appears.
25	DD	"The Princess"	Don Chaffey	Frank Tarloff and Louis Marks	6 April 1960
A princess from a small Asian kingdom, who is visiting Europe and whom Collier is trying to interview, seems to be a willing target for murder. Her entourage is complicit because she cannot provide the heir her country must have to survive. Features Betta St. John, Leonard Sachs, Lee Montague, and Frank Thornton (uncredited). Jack Hawkins and Richard Conte briefly appear.
26	RC	"The Protector"	Don Chaffey	Alan Morland and Leon Griffiths; Story by Alan Morland and Samuel B. West	20 April 1960
Janis Gorman, the head of a wealthy foundation after the death of her father, believes she is going insane, suffering from delusions after she is influenced by Dr Bannerman from England where he had a patient who committed suicide. Her American doctors ask Ryder for help. Features Maureen Connell, Ferdy Mayne and John Welsh. Jack Hawkins briefly appears.
27	VS	"The Man in the Royal Suite"	William Fairchild	John Collier and Samuel B. West; From an idea by Alec Coppel	27 April 1960
A racketeer's clerk deported from the U.S.A. arrives at the Hotel Poccari, to ask Poccari to hide him from his boss—who has also been deported to Rome and is still managing his American rackets. Poccari pities him and allows him to hide in the hotel's royal suite, masquerading as a millionaire. Features Kenneth Connor, Eric Pohlmann, Susan Marryott, Robert Rietti and Edward Evans. Richard Conte briefly appears.
28	DD	"The Grandmother"	Don Chaffey	Marc Brandel	4 May 1960
A scandal involving the supply of faulty ammunition to the French army fighting in Algiers is investigated by Collier and leads to one of the most honoured families in France. The proud and aristocratic matriarch of the family is determined to protect its reputation and prevent him from revealing the truth. Features Marie Ney, Fred Kitchen, Trader Faulkner, Joanna Dunham, John Van Eyssen and John Dearth. Jack Hawkins briefly appears.
29	JH	"The Man Who Wasn't There"	Basil Dearden	Lindsay Galloway	11 May 1960
The daughter of an eminent metallurgist engaged in top-secret work asks Manfred to look for her father, whom the government has taken to a secret hideout for his safety, but coded letters written by the scientist to his daughter implicate a top-secret Scottish naval base. Features Lionel Jeffries, William Mervyn, Michael Ripper, Richard Thorp, Gerard Heinz and Sheila Allen. Dan Dailey briefly appears.
30	RC	"The Bystanders"	Don Chaffey	Francis Rosenwald	18 May 1960
When a 12-year-old girl, Katy Pearson, infatuated with a 20-year-old tennis player, Ted Fenimore—strongly tipped to be the next Wimbledon champion—accuses him of molesting her, Ryder has the task of finding the truth from townspeople unwilling to help. Features Ronald Allen, Jeanette Bradbury, Patrick Holt, Robert Gallico and Michael Peake. Jack Hawkins briefly appears.
31	VS	"Rogue's Harvest"	Basil Dearden	T. E. B. Clarke	25 May 1960
Poccari is approached by the girlfriend of an embittered young criminal, who hid stolen money before he was jailed for a robbery committed five years earlier. Now, on his release, she wants Poccari's help to stop him from getting into more trouble by returning the money to the victim. Features Richard Pasco, Roger Delgado, Vera Fusek, George Pastell, Elizabeth Wallace and William Dexter. Richard Conte briefly appears.
32	DD	"The Godfather"	Don Chaffey	Wilton Schiller; Story by Wilton Schiller and William Fairchild	1 June 1960
Collier's friend Ernst Frenke arrives in Paris with his wife and adopted son, Collier's godson, carrying a million dollars to buy jet fighters from black-market racketeers for his small Middle Eastern country. When his son's real mother arrives and the boy is kidnapped for a million-dollar ransom, Collier has to find the kidnappers, who know he has the money. Features George Murcell, Sheila Allen, Eric Pohlmann, Laurence Payne and Tom Clegg. Jack Hawkins briefly appears.
33	RC	"Riot"	Anthony Bushell	Leon Griffiths; Story by Louis Marks	8 June 1960
When visiting a client at the state prison, Ryder is held hostage with three prison guards in a riot, organised by his client, about prison conditions. In a battle with state troopers, two troopers and four prisoners are killed, leaving Ryder trying to defuse the situation. Features Neil McCallum, Peter Dyneley, Percy Herbert and Max Faulkner.
34	JH	"The Heritage"	Basil Dearden	Louis Marks	15 June 1960
On the Republic of Ireland–United Kingdom border a plot to bomb a police station by the IRA is foiled by Kevan Malone, a nationalist who, unlike the other saboteurs, is strongly opposed to violence. He is captured by the police and then freed by his fellow saboteurs to be tried as a traitor. Nelson's girlfriend asks Manfred to help resolve the problem of a heritage of divided loyalties. Features Ronald Leigh-Hunt, Jack Melford, Concepta Fennell, Barry Keegan and Shay Gorman. Dan Dailey briefly appears.
35	RC	"The Last Days of Nick Pompey"	Don Chaffey	Jackson Gillis	22 June 1960
Gangster Nick Pompey offers Ryder his criminal account books if he travels to Rome to find his missing wife and daughter. Poccari assists him in tracking the wife and daughter held by Pompey's Italian representative who wants the books to take control from Pompey. Features Reed De Rouen, Betty McDowall, Eddie Byrne and Yvette Hosler. Vittorio De Sica and Richard Conte briefly appear.
36	DD	"The Moment of Truth"	Don Chaffey	Francis Rosenwald	13 July 1960
Young debutant Spanish bullfighter Cesarito Arenas has a secret fear of the bullfighting ring after his father Cesar was killed in the ring. Vito, his trainer, enlists the aid of the visiting Collier, who knows the boy's father and tells the boy the truth about his father. Features Jeremy Spenser and Patrick Troughton.
37	RC	"Justice for Gino"	Harry Watt	Lindsay Galloway; Story by Michael Connor	27 July 1960
Gino, a notorious gangster, is murdered indirectly by his brother, Arthur, arriving in New York. Seeking information from Jeff Ryder so he can kill the murderer Ryder has to find the killer first via Gino's ex-girlfriend now with his main rival before Arthur does. Features Vivian Matalon, Alan Tilvern, Mavis Villiers, Alan Gifford, Louise Collins and Edward Evans. Jack Hawkins briefly appears.
38	JH	"The Boy Without a Country"	Basil Dearden	Marc Brandel	10 August 1960
Taking up the newspaper story of Vito, a 14-year-old stateless orphan, who escaped from his life as a cabin boy aboard a tramp steamer, docked in London, with a vicious captain. Arrested by the police for theft Manfred decides to help Vito to get permission to stay in England. The captain is more interested in getting his stolen property back. Features Joseph Cuby, Martin Benson, Peter Illing, Victor Brooks and Frank Thornton. Dan Dailey and Vittorio De Sica briefly appear.
39	VS	"Treviso Dam"	Basil Dearden	Lindsay Galloway	17 August 1960
Poccari becomes involved when a young worker telephones claiming the Treviso Dam was being built with substandard concrete. Travelling the 300 miles to the Dam, Poccari is shocked to find the young man has been killed in an accident, and the man had a rival for the affections of a girl. Features Alan Bates, Judi Dench, George Pastell, Fenella Fielding and Brian McDermott. Richard Conte briefly appears.

== DVD ==
Network released the 39 episodes on August 13, 2010 in a five-DVD Region 2 set.
