= Terry Bishop =

British film director (1912–1981)

- Born: Terence Egan Bishop; 21 October 1912; Chiswick, London, England
- Died: 30 October 1981 (aged 69)
- Occupations: TV and film director
- Years active: 1941–1981

Terry Bishop (21 October 1912 – 30 October 1981) was a British screenwriter, and television and film director.

== Career ==
In the 1940s Bishop directed a series of public information and documentary films, including Daybreak in Udi (1949) for the Crown Film Unit which in 1950 won the Academy Award for Best Documentary Feature Film and a BAFTA for Best Documentary Film.

From 1950–1962 he worked extensively in British TV, directing episodes of series including The Adventures of William Tell, The Adventures of Robin Hood, Sword of Freedom, Danger Man, and Sir Francis Drake.

Bishop also made several low-budget British films during this period, including Cover Girl Killer (1959), featuring future Steptoe and Son star Harry H. Corbett as a serial murderer of glamour models.

== Director credits (film) ==
- The Western Isles (1941) – documentary short (as Terence Egan Bishop)
- Kill That Rat! (1941) – public information short (for the Ministry of Agriculture/Ministry of Information)
- Out of the Box (1942) – documentary short (for the Scottish Co-operative Wholesale Society)
- The Royal Mile: Edinburgh (1943) – documentary short (as Terence Egan Bishop)
- Five Towns (1947) – documentary short (for the Board of Trade)
- A Tale in a Teacup (1947) – documentary short (for the Tea Bureau)
- A Power in the Land (1947) – documentary short (for the Electrical Trades Union)
- Daybreak in Udi (1949) – documentary (Crown Film Unit)
- You're Only Young Twice (1952)
- Journey to the Sea (1952) – documentary short (British Transport Films)
- Savage World (1954) – documentary
- Tim Driscoll's Donkey (1955)
- Light Fingers (1957)
- Model for Murder (1959)
- Life in Danger (1959)
- Cover Girl Killer (1959)
- Danger Tomorrow (1960)
- The Unstoppable Man (1960)
- Hair of the Dog (1962)
- Bomb in the High Street (1963)
- Hamile a.k.a. The Tonga Hamlet (1964)
- A Small Miracle (1976) – short (for the National Kidney Research Fund)
- Suddenly Among Strangers (1981) – short (for the Malcolm Sargent Cancer Fund for Children)

== Director credits (television) ==
- The Adventures of Sir Lancelot (1956–1957), 4 episodes, Sapphire Films/ITV
- The Adventures of Robin Hood (1956–1960), 35 episodes, Sapphire Films/ATV
- The Buccaneers (1956), 2 episodes, Sapphire Films/ITC
- Sword of Freedom (1957–1959), 14 episodes, Sapphire Films/ITV
- The Adventures of William Tell (1958–1959), 6 episodes, ITC
- Danger Man (1960–1961), 4 episodes, ITC/ATV
- Kraft Mystery Theater (1961), 1 episode, NBC
- Sir Francis Drake (1962), 6 episodes, ITC
