= John Rae (actor) =

Scottish actor (1895–1977)

- John Rae in Danger Man episode: The Sanctuary (1960)
- Born: 21 June 1895; Perth, Scotland
- Died: June 4, 1977 (aged 81); Hampstead
- Occupation: Actor
- Years active: 1934 - 1976
- Known for: Oh! What a Lovely War, The Big Chance

John Rae (21 June 1895 – 4 June 1977) was a Scottish actor.

He appeared in films including I Know Where I'm Going! (1945), The Big Chance (1957), Morgan – A Suitable Case for Treatment (1966) and Oh! What a Lovely War (1969).

== Selected filmography ==
- Neutral Port (1940) - (uncredited)
- Tawny Pipit (1944) - Mr. Dougal
- One Exciting Night (1944) - Scottish Official (uncredited)
- Soldier, Sailor (1944) - Chief Engineer
- He Snoops to Conquer (1945) - (uncredited)
- I Know Where I'm Going! (1945) - Old Shepherd
- Green for Danger (1947) - The Porter
- So Well Remembered (1947) - Man in Street (uncredited)
- Bonnie Prince Charlie (1948) - Duncan
- The Brave Don't Cry (1952) - Donald Sloan
- The Story of Gilbert and Sullivan (1953) - Ferguson
- Johnny on the Run (1953) - Radio Salesman
- The Heart of the Matter (1953) - Loder (uncredited)
- The Kidnappers (US: The Little Kidnappers, 1953) - Andrew McCleod
- The Maggie (1954) - The Constable
- Escapade (1955) - Curly
- Quatermass 2 (1957) - McLeod
- Manuela (1957) - Ferguson
- The Abominable Snowman (1957) - Yeti (uncredited)
- The Big Chance (1957) - Mr. Jarvis
- Innocent Sinners (1958) - Mr. Isbister
- A Question of Adultery (1958) - Jury Foreman
- Harry Black and the Tiger (1958) - Fisherman
- The Bridal Path (1959) - Angus
- The Flesh and the Fiends (1960) - Reverend Lincoln (uncredited)
- The Day the Earth Caught Fire (1961) - Sarge the Doorman (uncredited)
- Heart to Heart (1962) – William
- Take Me Over (1963)
- Morgan – A Suitable Case for Treatment (1966) - Judge
- Fahrenheit 451 (1966) - Book Person: 'Weir of Hermiston' (uncredited)
- Oh! What a Lovely War (1969) - Grandpa Smith
- Fragment of Fear (1970) - Uncle Stanley
- Sunday Bloody Sunday (1971) - Airline Doctor
- John Keats: His Life and Death (1973) - First Critic
