= Adrienne Corri =

Scottish actress (1931–2016)

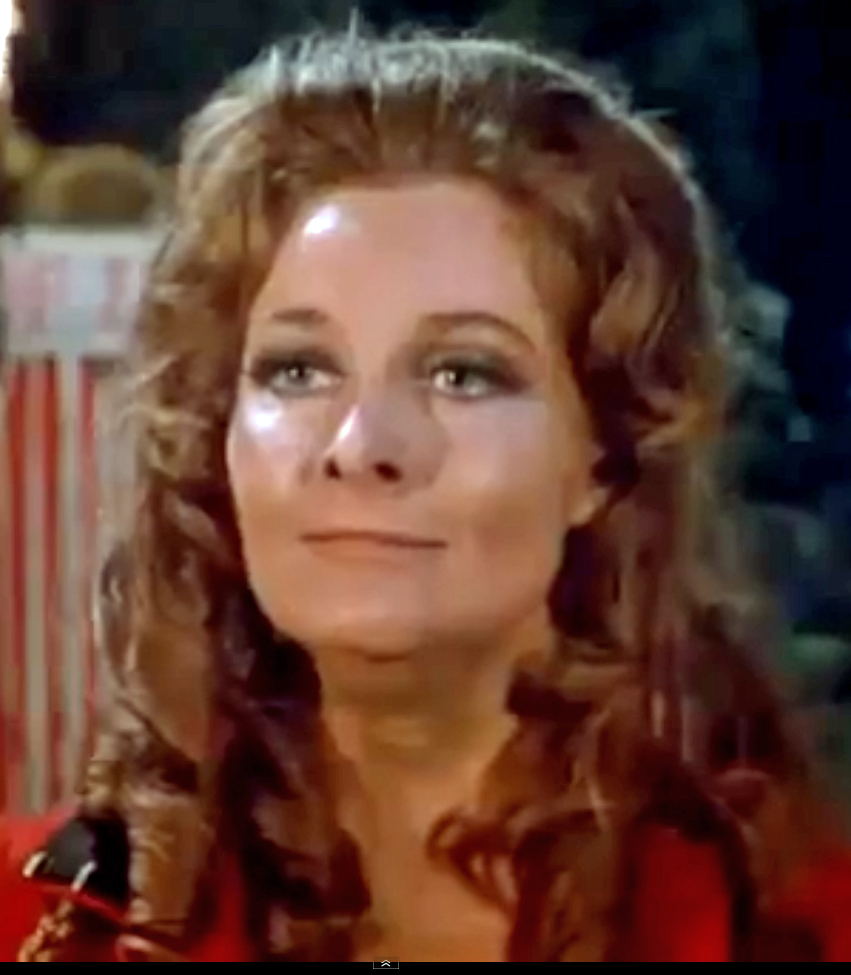
- Corri in Vampire Circus (1972)
- Born: Adrienne Riccoboni; 13 November 1931; Glasgow, Scotland
- Died: 13 March 2016 (aged 84); London, England
- Occupation: Actress
- Years active: 1949–1992
- Spouse: Daniel Massey (m. 1961; div. 1967)
- Children: 2

Adrienne Corri (born Adrienne Riccoboni; 13 November 1931 – 13 March 2016) was a Scottish actress.

== Early life ==
She was born Adrienne Riccoboni in Glasgow in November 1931, the daughter of an English mother (Olive Smethurst) and an Italian father (Luigi Riccoboni; sometimes spelt Reccobini). In the 1930s, her father Luigi (known as Louis) ran the Crown Hotel in Callander, Stirling. She had one brother.

== Career ==
Corri may be best known for one of her smaller parts, that of Mary Alexander, wife of the writer Frank Alexander (played by Patrick Magee), in Stanley Kubrick's dystopian A Clockwork Orange (1971). Corri, not originally cast in the film, was offered the role after two actresses had already withdrawn from the production, one of them, according to Malcolm McDowell (who played Alex DeLarge), because she found it "too humiliating – because it involved having to be perched, naked, on Warren Clarke's (playing "Dim the Droog") shoulders for weeks on end while Stanley decided which shot he liked the best." Corri had no such qualms about appearing naked, joking to McDowell: "Well, Malcolm, you're about to find out that I'm a real redhead."

Corri earned Kubrick's respect by her willingness to undergo the gruelling process of shooting endless takes. She recalled: "For four days I was bashed about by Malcolm (Alex) and he really hit me. One scene was shot 39 times until Malcolm said 'I can't hit her any more!'"

Corri's film debut was in The Romantic Age (1949), which was followed by Jean Renoir's version of The River (1951). Her other film roles included Lara's mother in David Lean's Dr. Zhivago and Dorothy in Otto Preminger's thriller Bunny Lake Is Missing (both 1965). She also appeared in a number of horror and suspense films until the 1970s including Devil Girl from Mars (1954), The Tell-Tale Heart (1960), A Study in Terror (1965) and Vampire Circus (1972). She also appeared as Therese Duval in Revenge of the Pink Panther (1978).

She appeared in such diverse productions as the science fiction movie Moon Zero Two (1969) and a television version of Twelfth Night (1970), directed by John Sichel, as the Countess Olivia, where she played opposite Sir Alec Guinness as Malvolio.

Her other television credits include Angelica in Sword of Freedom (1958), Yolanda in The Invisible Man episode "Crisis in the Desert" (1958), regular roles in A Family at War and You're Only Young Twice (both 1971 – the latter a television series created by Jack Trevor Story), Mena in the Doctor Who story "The Leisure Hive" (1980), and Veronica in Love in a Cold Climate (1980). She guest-starred as the mariticidal Liz Newton in the UFO episode "The Square Triangle" (1970) and was in two episodes of Danger Man (US: Secret Agent, both 1965). She was equally at home in the classics of British theatre, giving an outstanding performance as Lady Fidget in a BBC Play of the Month, William Wycherley's Restoration comedy The Country Wife (1977), with Helen Mirren.

Corri had a major stage career, appearing regularly both in London and in the provincial theatres. She appeared in one of the first English performances in 1968 of Come and Go, Samuel Beckett's one-act "dramaticule", in Beckett's coinage, performed at the Royal Festival Hall as part of "a gala entertainment concerning depravity and corruption" (the words coming from the nineteenth-century definition of obscenity), sponsored by the National Council for Civil Liberties and the Defence of Literature and the Arts Society, which raised funds to support publishers being prosecuted for obscenity. It was directed by Deryk Mendel, with Corri appearing alongside Marie Kean and Billie Whitelaw in the roles of Flo, Vi, and Ru. The evening included both classical and rock music, and a mixed programme compèred by George Melly. In his entry for Clifford Anthony Smythe in the online Oxford Dictionary of National Biography, John Calder records that "The profit was much less than expected for a sold-out house, as the person who had volunteered to organise the souvenir programme spent too little time finding advertisers as against providing editorial content."

== Personal life ==
Corri was known for her feisty personality. When the audience booed on the first night of John Osborne's The World of Paul Slickey, she responded by raising two fingers to the audience and shouting: "Go fuck yourselves". During the making of Moon Zero Two, she poured a glass of iced water inside James Olson's rubber space suit. Despite his uncomfortable state, Olson was obliged to wear the suit for the remainder of the day's shooting.

Corri was acquainted with many of the leading figures in the British theatre, including Joe Orton, who recounted in his diaries that he asked her advice on how best to end his relationship with his lover, Kenneth Halliwell. She enjoyed a good relationship with Stanley Kubrick, who joked with her that, in the home invasion sequence in A Clockwork Orange, she was cast in "the Debbie Reynolds part", a reference to Reynolds's role in the film Singin' in the Rain (1952). After completing A Clockwork Orange, Corri kept in touch with Kubrick, who complained to her about the problem he had of losing socks whenever he did the washing, so for Christmas she gave him a pair of bright red socks, a humorous reference to her scene in A Clockwork Orange in which, after Alex had finished snipping off her red pyjama suit, she was naked except for a pair of red socks.

In the louche atmosphere of the 1960s, when peers, film stars and gangsters rubbed shoulders, Corri became acquainted with some of London's demi-monde, including the much-married bon viveur John Wodehouse, 4th Earl of Kimberley, as well as socialising with other actors, and the Kray twins at their El Morocco club, one of the haunts of Conservative politician Robert Boothby, an acquaintance of the Krays, who used the twin brothers to supply him with rent boys.

She had two children, Patrick and Sarah Filmer-Sankey, from a relationship with the film producer Patrick Filmer-Sankey in the 1950s.

Corri died at her home in London on 13 March 2016 from coronary artery disease, at the age of 84.

== Gainsborough studies ==
She was the author of The Search for Gainsborough, a book written in diary form, detailing her efforts to establish the provenance of a painting of David Garrick which she believed to be by a young Thomas Gainsborough. She also wrote a scholarly article in The Burlington Magazine about the portrait and its connection to Gainsborough's very early work Self Portrait as a Boy, c. 1739 (the latter can be seen online at the Historical Portraits Image Library).

Corri's research and her article are discussed in "Tom will be a genius – new landscapes by the young Thomas Gainsborough", the catalogue of an exhibition at Philip Mould Ltd, 4–28 July 2009, with text by Lindsay Stainton and Bendor Grosvenor. Corri's claim that the painting was by the young Gainsborough was based on her detailed research into the archives of the Bank of England, which indicated that significant financial payments were made to Gainsborough while he was still a boy. Following a claim by Corri for the expense incurred restoring and authenticating the picture, the painting was given to her in May 1990, in an out-of-court settlement with the Alexandra Theatre in Birmingham, which disputed her valuation and the attribution to Gainsborough.

== Marriage ==
Corri was married to actor Daniel Massey from 1961 until they divorced in 1967. The marriage to Massey proved to be somewhat tempestuous, with Massey describing the relationship in the following terms, "We were agonizingly incompatible but we had an extraordinary physical attraction." Massey envisaged a domestic life for Corri but she realised that she was not suited to being a full-time housewife, and after a six-year hiatus she resumed her career as an actress.

== Filmography ==
Year	Title	Role	Notes
1949	The Romantic Age	Norah	
1951	The River	Valerie	
1951	Quo Vadis	Young Christian Girl	uncredited
1953	The Kidnappers	Kirsty	US: The Little Kidnappers
1954	Devil Girl from Mars	Doris	
1954	Meet Mr. Callaghan	Mayola Verville	
1954	Lease of Life	Susan Thorne	
1954	Make Me an Offer	Nicky	
1956	The Anatomist	Mary Paterson	British TV movie, released theatrically in U.S. in 1961
1956	The Feminine Touch	Maureen	
1956	Behind the Headlines	Pam Barnes	
1956	The Shield of Faith		
1956	Three Men in a Boat	Clara Willis	
1957	Second Fiddle	Deborah	
1957	The Big Chance	Diana Maxwell	
1957	The Surgeon's Knife	Laura Shelton	
1958	Corridors of Blood	Rachel	
1959	The Rough and the Smooth	Jane Buller	
1960	The Tell-Tale Heart	Betty Clare	
1960	The Hellfire Club	Lady Isobel	
1961	Dynamite Jack	Pegeen O'Brien	
1963	Lancelot and Guinevere	Lady Vivian	
1965	Bunny Lake Is Missing	Dorothy	
1965	A Study in Terror	Angela	
1965	Doctor Zhivago	Amelia	
1967	The Viking Queen	Beatrice	
1967	Africa: Texas Style	Fay Carter	
1967	Woman Times Seven	Mme. Lisiere	Segment: At the Opera
1968	Journey into Darkness	Terry Lawrence	Segment: The New People
1969	The File of the Golden Goose	Angela Richmond	
1969	Moon Zero Two	Liz	
1969	Cry Wolf	Mrs. Quinn – woman in tobacconist's shop	
1970	Twelfth Night	Olivia	
1971	A Clockwork Orange	Mrs. Alexander	
1972	Vampire Circus	Gypsy Woman	
1974	Madhouse	Faye Carstairs Flay	
1974	The Three Musketeers	Milady	Voice
1975	Rosebud	Lady Carter	
1978	Revenge of the Pink Panther	Therese Douvier	
1979	The Human Factor	Sylvia	

== Television ==
Year	Title	Role	Notes
1952	Robert Montgomery Presents	Peggy	2 episodes
1954	The Three Musketeers	Milady de Winter	4 episodes
1955	Rheingold Theatre	Jessie	Episode: "The Auction"
1955-1957	The Vise	Helen/Marsha	3 episodes
1956	Colonel March of Scotland Yard	Clara	Episode: "Error at Daybreak"
1956	The Count of Monte Cristo	Simone/Gabrielle	2 episodes
1956-1961	ITV Television Playhouse	Various	5 episodes
1956-1961	ITV Play of the Week	Various	4 episodes
1956-1967	Armchair Theatre	Various	7 episodes
1957	Assignment Foreign Legion	Gabrielle	Episode: "The Conquering Hero"
1957	The Buccaneers	Mistress Higgins	Episode: "Mistress Higgins' Treasure"
1957	The New Adventures of Charlie Chan	Monica Breton	Episode: "Patron of the Arts"
1957-1958	Sword of Freedom	Angelica Verdi	23 episodes
1958	White Hunter	Maria Vanyer	Episode: "One Fatal Weakness"
1958	Dial 999	Helga	Episode: "Illegal Entry"
1958	Target		Episode: "The Clean Kill"
1958	Ivanhoe	Edith	Episode: "3 Days to Worcester"
1958	The Invisible Man	Yolanda	Episode: "Crisis in the Desert"
1958-1959	BBC Sunday Night Theatre	Various	2 episodes
1959	The Adventures of William Tell	Mara	Episode: "The Master Spy"
1959	Epilogue to Capricorn	Jill Howard	3 episodes
1960	Armchair Mystery Theatre	Madeline	Episode: "Madeline"
1960-1962	BBC Sunday-Night Play	Lydia Kuman/Queenie Gibbons	2 episodes
1961	One Step Beyond	Sarah Malone	Episode: "The Confession"
1963	Zero One	Hope Branch	Episode: "Danger on Cloud Seven"
1965	Danger Man	Pauline/Elaine Pearson	2 episodes
1965	The Man in Room 17	Lynne Crawshaw	Episode: "Hello, Lazarus"
1966	The Troubleshooters	Monserrat Vera	Episode: "Birdstrike"
1966	Adam Adamant Lives!	Shani Mathieson	Episode: "The Sweet Smell of Disaster"
1966	Drama 61-67		Episode: "Drama '66: One Day It Could Be Different"
1967	Mr. Rose	Elinor Gray	Episode: "The Naked Emperor"
1967	The Revenue Men	Helen Carlisle	Episode: "You Can Always Resign"
1968	The Champions	Mrs. Trennick	Episode: "The Night People"
1968	Gazette	Helga Gregory	Episode: "Announcement"
1968	Journey to the Unknown	Terry Lawrence	Episode: "The New People"
1968-1978	BBC Play of the Month	Various	3 episodes
1969	ITV Playhouse	Miss Chester	Episode: "The John Hiarian Salt Exhibition and Numerous Illustrated Slides"
1969	Randall and Hopkirk (Deceased)	Laura Watson	Episode: "All Work and No Play"
1969	Department S	Monique Grelle	Episode: "The Man Who Got a New Face"
1970	Play for Today	Elinor Barkham	Episode: "A Distant Thunder"
1970-1973	ITV Saturday Night Theatre	Various	3 episodes
1971	A Family at War	Grace Gould	4 episodes
1972	The View from Daniel Pike	Mrs. Eustace	Episode: "Big Fleas, Little Fleas"
1973	The Adventurer	Nita	Episode: "The Good Book"
1974	Napoleon and Love	La Grassini	Miniseries
1976	The Dick Emery Show		Episode 14.4
1978	BBC Television Shakespeare	Mistress Overdone	Episode: Measure for Measure
1980	Doctor Who	Mena	Serial: "The Leisure Hive"
1980	Love in a Cold Climate	Veronica Chaddesley-Corbett	2 episodes
1985	Dramarama	Thea Tucker	Episode: "A Proper Little Nooryef"
1992	Lovejoy	Lady Rebecca	Episode: "Highland Fling"
