= William Russell (English actor) =

English actor (1924–2024)

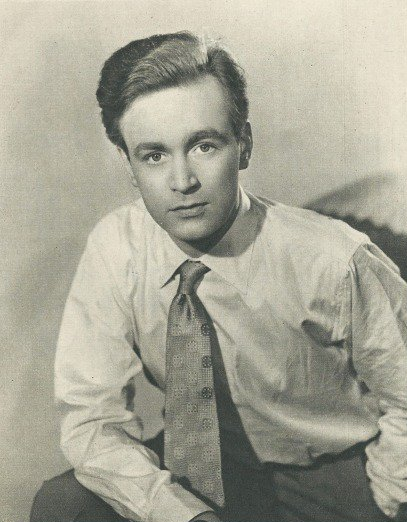
- William Russell in 1953
- Born: William Russell Enoch; 19 November 1924; Sunderland, County Durham, England
- Died: 3 June 2024 (aged 99); Gospel Oak, London, England
- Other name: Russell Enoch
- Occupation: Actor
- Years active: 1949–2022
- Notable work: Doctor Who; The Adventures of Sir Lancelot
- Spouses: Balbina Gutierrez (m. 1953, divorced); Etheline Lewis (m. 1984)
- Children: 4, including Alfred Enoch

William Russell Enoch (19 November 1924 – 3 June 2024) was an English actor who performed as both Russell Enoch and William Russell. His career on stage and screen spanned over seven decades and he first achieved prominence in the title role of the television series The Adventures of Sir Lancelot (1956–1957). In 1963, he was in the original lead cast of BBC1's Doctor Who, playing the role of schoolteacher Ian Chesterton from the show's first episode until 1965.

Russell's film roles include parts in The Man Who Never Was (1956), The Great Escape (1963) and Superman (1978). On television, he appeared as Ted Sullivan in Coronation Street in 1992. In his later years, he continued his association with Doctor Who and returned as Ian for a 2022 cameo in "The Power of the Doctor", 57 years after the character left, which won him a Guinness World Record for the longest gap between TV appearances.

== Early life ==
William Russell Enoch was born on 19 November 1924 in Sunderland, County Durham, to Eva Compston (née Pyle) and Alfred James Enoch. He was educated at Wolverhampton Grammar School and Oxford University and became interested in acting at an early age. He was involved in organising entertainment during his national service in the Royal Air Force and then, after university, went into repertory theatre.

== Doctor Who ==
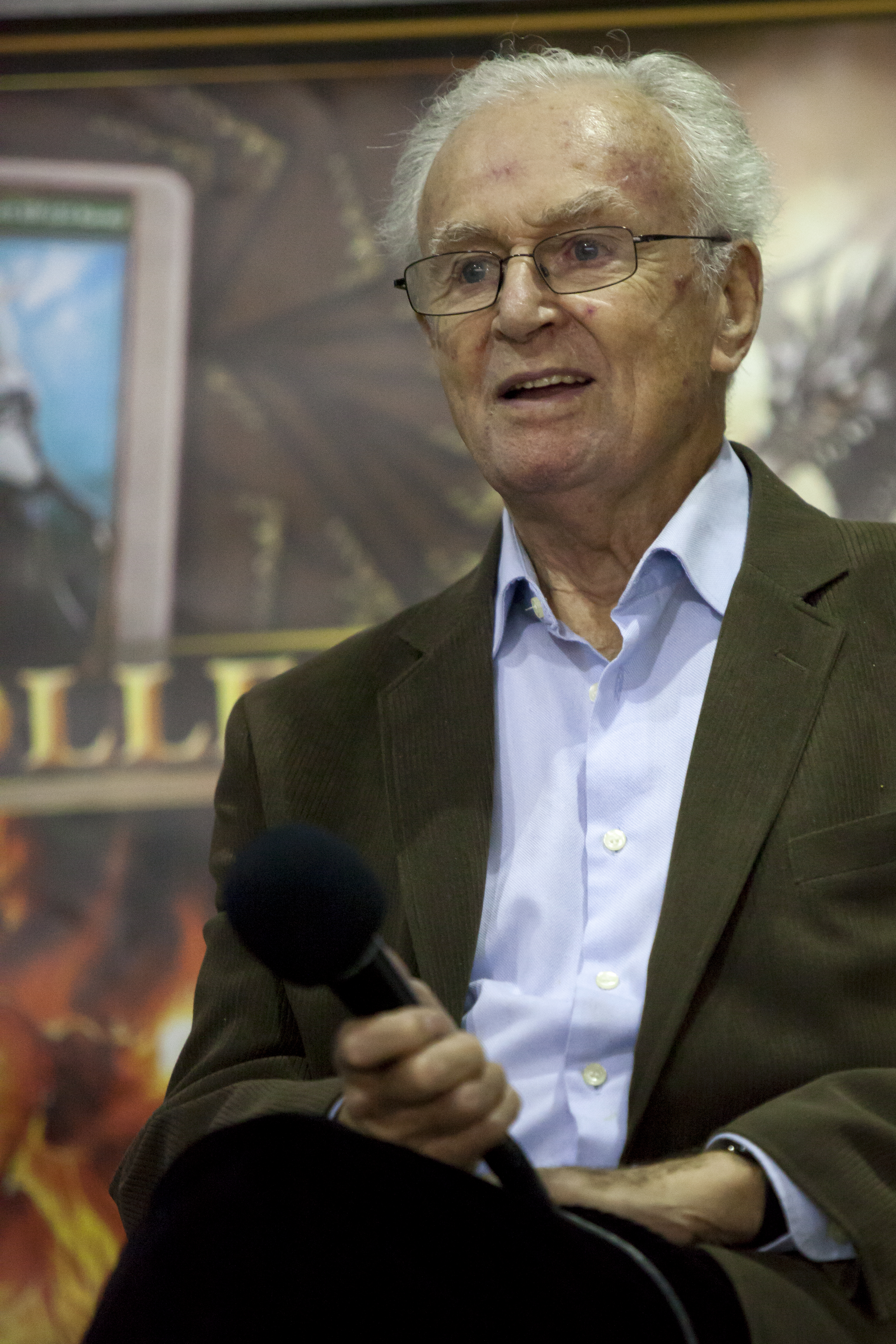
Russell at the 2012 London Film and Comic Con

In 1963, Russell was cast in Doctor Who as science teacher Ian Chesterton, the Doctor's first male companion, appearing in all episodes of the first two seasons of the programme except the last four.

Russell was one of the four original cast members of Doctor Who, starring opposite William Hartnell as the First Doctor, Jacqueline Hill as Barbara Wright, Carole Ann Ford as Susan Foreman and later Maureen O'Brien as Vicki. His first involvement in the series took form in the pilot episode (not transmitted until 1991), which was later reshot and broadcast as the first episode of An Unearthly Child, the programme's first serial. He eventually departed, alongside Hill, in "The Planet of Decision", the final episode of The Chase, which served as the penultimate story of the second season.

It was intended that Russell would reprise the role of Ian in the 1983 serial Mawdryn Undead alongside Peter Davison as the Fifth Doctor for the twentieth season. Scheduling conflicts left him unavailable.

After leaving Coronation Street in 1992, Russell had maintained his association with Doctor Who, having lent his voice as a narrator to several of the audiobook releases of the lost 1960s episodes. He appeared in The Game, one of the continuing Doctor Who audio stories produced by Big Finish Productions. He also recorded readings for some of the CD audio adaptations of Doctor Who story novelisations originally published by Target Books.

In 1999, Russell returned to the role of Ian for the VHS release of The Crusade, of which "The Knight of Jaffa" and "The Warlords", the second and fourth episodes, respectively, are lost. He recorded several in-character scenes to camera, which helped to bridge the gaps between the existing episodes.

Russell also contributed to the Doctor Who DVD range, having participated in several audio commentaries and on-screen interviews since 2002.

In 2013, the BBC produced An Adventure in Space and Time, a docudrama depicting the creation and early days of Doctor Who, as part of the programme's fiftieth anniversary celebrations. Russell was a character in the drama and was portrayed by actor Jamie Glover. Russell himself had a cameo role, playing a BBC Commissionaire named Harry.

The same year, Russell portrayed both Ian and the First Doctor in the Big Finish audio play The Light at the End, produced to celebrate the fiftieth anniversary; aged 88, he became the oldest person to portray the Doctor, a record he held until March 2023, when Tom Baker portrayed the Fourth Doctor in the Big Finish audio series The Fourth Doctor Adventures at the age of 89.

Russell made a cameo appearance as Ian in the 2022 special "The Power of the Doctor". With this, his final role, he won a Guinness World Record for the longest gap between TV appearances.

== Personal life and death ==
In 1953, Russell married Balbina Gutierrez. The couple had three children but later divorced.

In 1984, he married his second wife, Etheline Margareth Lewis, a Barbadian Brazilian doctor. Their son, Alfred Enoch, was born in 1988. Enoch subsequently became an actor as well, best known for playing Dean Thomas in the Harry Potter film series and Wes Gibbins in the television series How to Get Away with Murder. They performed together in the 2020 movie Executive Order.

Russell died at his home from pneumonia on 3 June 2024, aged 99.

== Filmography ==
=== Film ===
Russell appeared in British films from 1950 onward, appearing in well-known productions such as They Who Dare (1954), One Good Turn (1955), The Man Who Never Was (1956) and The Great Escape (1963). He later played minor roles in Terror (1978), Superman (1978) and Death Watch (1979).

Year	Title	Role	Notes
1952	Gift Horse a.k.a. Glory at Sea	Crewman	As Russell Enoch
1953	Appointment in London a.k.a. Raiders in the Sky	RAF Officer	Uncredited
1953	Intimate Relations a.k.a. Disobedient	Michael	As Russell Enoch
1953	Malta Story	Officer in Prison	Uncredited
1953	Always a Bride	Dutton's Chauffeur	Uncredited
1953	The Saint's Return a.k.a. The Saint's Girl Friday	Keith Merton	As Russell Enoch
1954	They Who Dare	Lieut. Tom Poole	As Russell Enoch
1954	The Gay Dog	Leslie Gowland	As Russell Enoch
1955	One Good Turn	Alec Bigley	
1955	Above Us the Waves	Ramsey	
1956	The Man Who Never Was	Joe	
1957	The Big Chance	Bill Anderson	
1958	The Adventures of Hal 5	The Vicar	
1962	The Share Out	Mike Stafford	
1963	The Great Escape	Sorren	
1963	Return to Sender	Mike Cochrane	
1978	Terror	Lord Garrick	
1978	Superman	8th Elder	
1980	Death Watch	Dr Mason	As William Russel
1981	Mark Gertler: Fragments of a Biography	Roger Fry	
1990	Deadly Manor	Alfred	
2016	The Visit	Hospital patient	Short film
2020	Executive Order		Cameo appearance

=== Television ===
Russell's big break was the title role in The Adventures of Sir Lancelot on ITV in 1956, which for sale to the American NBC network became the first UK television series to be shot in colour. He acted in many plays and TV series including Disraeli, Testament of Youth and Coronation Street (as Ted Sullivan, the short-lived second husband of Rita Sullivan). He had a small part in an episode of The Black Adder, as a late replacement for Wilfrid Brambell, who became impatient with delays to his scene and left the set before shooting it. He was the Duke of Gloucester in the Robin of Sherwood episode, "The Pretender", and Lanscombe in a 2005 Agatha Christie's Poirot episode, "After the Funeral".

Year	Title	Episode(s)	Role	Network	Archive status
1954	Lonesome Like	TV Movie	Rev. Frank Alleyne (as Russell Enoch)	BBC Television Service	Missing
1954	BBC Sunday-Night Theatre	Series 5, Episode 16 & 49: It Never Rains / The Whiteoak Chronicles - Young Renny	Bill Bolton (as Russell Enoch) / Renny	BBC Television Service	Missing
1955	BBC Sunday-Night Theatre	Series 6, Episode 38: The Scarlet Pimpernel	Vicomte de Tournai	BBC Television Service	Missing
1955	St. Ives	All 6 episodes	St. Ives	BBC Television Service	Exists
1955	The Sleeping Beauty	TV Movie	The Prince	BBC Television Service	Exists
1956	Theatre Royal	Episode 19: The Assassin	Boy	ITV (ATV)	Exists
1956-1957	The Adventures of Sir Lancelot	All 30 episodes	Sir Lancelot du lac / Sir Bliant	ITV (ITC)	Exists
1956	Assignment Foreign Legion	Episode 8: The Ghost	Gerry Brooke	CBS	Missing
1956	The Adventures of Aggie	Episode 10: Hypertension	Ted Jordan	ITV	Missing
1957	Hour of Mystery	Episode 8: The Crime of Margaret Foley	Kevin Ormond	ITV (ABC)	Missing
1957	Nicholas Nickleby	All 10 episodes	Nicholas Nickleby	BBC Television Service	Missing
1957	Sword of Freedom	Series 1, Episode 29: The Strange Intruder	Count René d'Albert	ITV (ITC)	Exists
1958	Television World Theatre	Episode 11: The Circle of Chalk	Prince Pao	BBC Television Service	Missing
1958	Who Fought Alone: Epitaph on a Scottish Soldier	TV Movie	Unknown	BBC Television Service	Missing
1958	Saturday Playhouse	Episode 23: The Duke in Darkness	Voulain	BBC Television Service	Missing
1958	Television Playwright	Episode 22: In a Backward Country	Anthony Broderick	BBC Television Service	Missing
1959	ITV Play of the Week	Series 4, Episode 28: The Face of Treason	Nevil Rigden	ITV	Missing
1959	Armchair Theatre	Series 3, Episode 37: The Girl on the Beach	Smoky	ITV (ABC)	Missing
1959	Tales from Dickens	Episodes: Uriah Heep & David and Dora	David Copperfield	ITV	Exists
1959	Never Die	TV Movie	Inspector Sauvé	BBC Television Service	Missing
1960	St. Ives	All 6 episodes; remake of	St. Ives	BBC Television Service	Missing
1960	Twentieth Century Theatre	Our Betters / The Fanatics / I Have Been Here Before / The Elder Statesman	Lord Bleane / John Freeman / Oliver Farrant / Charles Hemington	BBC Television Service	Partial (The Fanatics survives)
1960	Summer Theatre	Episode: The Devil's General	Col. Friedrich Eilers	BBC Television Service	Missing
1961	Tales from Dickens	Episode: David and Dora Get Married	David Copperfield	ITV	Exists
1961	BBC Sunday-Night Play	Series 2, Episode 18: An Inspector Calls	Gerald Croft	BBC Television	Missing
1961	Triton	All 4 episodes	Captain Belwether	BBC Television	Missing
1961	Adventure Story	TV Movie	Hephaestion	BBC Television	Exists
1961	Hamlet	All 5 episodes	Hamlet	ITV (Rediffusion)	Missing
1961	A Song of Sixpence	TV Movie	Alberto Monzelli	BBC Television	Missing
1963	Drama '63	Series 3, Episode 7: Somebody's Dying	Mick Lambert	ITV (ATV)	Exists
1963	Jane Eyre	Episode 5	St. John Rivers	BBC Television	Exists
1963	Suspense	Series 2, Episode 28: The Patch Card	John Richards	BBC Television	Missing
1963	BBC Sunday-Night Play	Series 4, Episode 46: Pig in the Middle	Frank	BBC Television	Missing
1963	Doctor Who	Series 1, 42 episodes	Ian Chesterton	BBC Television	Partial (9 episodes missing)
1964	Doctor Who	Series 1, 42 episodes	Ian Chesterton	BBC Television	Partial (9 episodes missing)
1964	Doctor Who	Series 2, 35 episodes	Ian Chesterton	BBC One	Partial (2 episodes missing)
1965	Doctor Who	Series 2, 35 episodes	Ian Chesterton	BBC One	Partial (2 episodes missing)
1966	This Man Craig	Series 1, Episode 22 & 26: Mates / Old Flame	Avis / Peter Woodburn	BBC Two	Missing
1966	Breaking Point	All 5 episodes	Martin Kennedy	BBC Two	Missing
1967	Dr. Finlay's Casebook	Series 5, Episode 6: Who Made You?	Neville	BBC One	Missing
1967	This Man Craig	Series 2, Episode 20: You Can Choose Your Friends	Peter Rogers	BBC Two	Missing
1969	Who-Dun-It	Episode 10: Don't Shoot the Cook	Marcel Dupre	ITV (ATV)	Exists
1969	Detective	Series 3, Episode 8: And So to Murder	Bill Cartwright	BBC One	Missing
1969	Parkin's Patch	Episode 14: No Friendship for Coppers	Wilkins	ITV (Yorkshire)	Exists
1972-1973	Harriet's Back in Town	90 episodes	Tom Preston	ITV (Thames)	Exists
1972	ITV Playhouse	Series 6, Episode 5: Buggins' Ermine	Frank	ITV (Granada)	Exists
1974	Justice	Series 3, Episode 12: Point of Death	Dr. Victor Ainsworth	ITV (Yorkshire)	Exists
1974	Father Brown	Episode 1: The Hammer of God	Rev. Wilfred Bohun	ITV (ATV)	Exists
1974	Whodunnit?	Christmas Special: A Piece of Cake	Captain Alexander Anderson	ITV (Thames)	Exists
1975	The Hanged Man	Episode 3: Knave of Coins	Peter Kroger	ITV (Yorkshire)	Exists
1975	Crown Court	Series 4, Episodes 49 & 50: Dead Drunk Pts. 2-3	Edward Birkland	ITV (Granada)	Exists
1975	The Main Chance	Series 4, Episode 12: We're the Bosses Now	Arnold Galbraith	ITV (Yorkshire)	Exists
1975	Against the Crowd	Episode 7: Bread and Circuses	Arthur Penwarren	ITV (ATV)	Exists
1975	The Doll	Episodes 2 & 3	Julian Osbourne	BBC One	Exists
1976	Scene	Series 9, Episode 6: Newsworthy: The Girl Who Saw a Tiger	Mr. Rose	BBC One	Exists
1977	Crown Court	Series 6, Episodes 4-6: Home Sweet Home Pts. 1-3	Robert Aldrich	ITV (Granada)	Exists
1977	Van der Valk	Series 3, Episode 2: Accidental	Rokin	ITV (Thames)	Exists
1978	Strangers	Series 1, Episode 4: Accidental Death	Bamford Harker	ITV (Granada)	Exists
1978	Parables	Episode 3: A Gentle Rain	Peter Vernon	ITV	Missing
1978	Disraeli	Episodes 1 & 2	Wyndham Lewis	ITV (ATV)	All programmes exist from this point
1978	BBC2 Play of the Week	Series 2, Episode 3: Fearless Frank	Headmaster / Lord Folkestone / Chapman	BBC Two	All programmes exist from this point
1979	Spearhead	Series 2, Episode 5: Repercussions	Mr. Dickson B.F.S.	ITV (Southern)	All programmes exist from this point
1979	Shoestring	Series 1, Episode 1: Private Ear	David Carn	BBC One	All programmes exist from this point
1979	Testament of Youth	Series 1, Episode 1: Buxton 1913	Marriott	BBC Two	All programmes exist from this point
1980	Play for Today	Series 10, Episode 16: Instant Enlightenment Including VAT	Don	BBC One	All programmes exist from this point
1980	ITV Playhouse	Series 12, Episode 11: Lindsey	Dr. Crane	ITV (Thames)	All programmes exist from this point
1980	The Professionals	Series 4, Episode 4: Involvement	Charles Holly	ITV (LWT)	All programmes exist from this point
1980	Mackenzie	4 episodes	Francis Hammond	BBC One	All programmes exist from this point
1981	ITV Playhouse	Series 13, Episode 1: Little Girls Don't	Daddy	ITV (Thames)	All programmes exist from this point
1983	The Black Adder	Series 1, Episode 3: The Archbishop	The Duke of Winchester (as Russell Enoch)	BBC One	All programmes exist from this point
1986	Robin of Sherwood	Series 3, Episode 10: The Pretender	The Duke of Gloucester	ITV (HTV)	All programmes exist from this point
1988	The Four Minute Mile	TV Movie	AAA Official (as Russel Enoch)	ABC	All programmes exist from this point
1990	Boon	Series 5, Episode 2: Tales From the Riverbank	John Losely (as Russell Enoch)	ITV (Central)	All programmes exist from this point
1992	Coronation Street	47 episodes	Ted Sullivan	ITV (Granada)	All programmes exist from this point
1995	The Affair	TV Movie	Dr. Hastings	HBO	All programmes exist from this point
1995	Casualty	Series 10, Episode 5: Halfway House	Mo Meredew	BBC One	All programmes exist from this point
2000	Heartbeat	Series 10, Episode 4: Gabriel's Last Stand	Gabriel Firth	ITV (Yorkshire)	All programmes exist from this point
2006	Poirot	Series 10, Episode 3: After the Funeral	Lanscombe	ITV1	All programmes exist from this point
2013	An Adventure in Space and Time	TV Movie	Harry - security guard	BBC Two	All programmes exist from this point
2022	Doctor Who	Episode: The Power of the Doctor	Ian Chesterton	BBC One	All programmes exist from this point

=== Audio ===
Year	Title	Role	Notes
2005	Doctor Who: The Monthly Range	Darzil Carlisle	Big Finish Productions; Story: "The Game"
2009–2014	Doctor Who: The Companion Chronicles	Ian Chesterton	Big Finish Productions; 8 releases
2010–2013	Doctor Who: The Lost Stories	Ian Chesterton	Big Finish Productions; 4 releases
2011	The Five Companions	Ian Chesterton	Big Finish Productions; Special release
2013	The Light at the End	Ian Chesterton, First Doctor	Big Finish Productions; Special release
2014, 2016	Doctor Who: The Early Adventures	Ian Chesterton, First Doctor	Big Finish Productions; 4 releases
2016–2017	Big Finish Short Trips	Narrator	4 releases
2020	Susan's War	Ian Chesterton	Big Finish Productions; Story: "Sphere of Influence"
