= The Maid of Amsterdam =

Sea shanty

- Traditional sea shanty
- Genre: Sea shanty
- Composed: c. 1600

"The Maid of Amsterdam", also known as "A-Roving", is a traditional sea shanty. It has a Roud Folk Song Index number of 649.

== History ==
The song may date to the Elizabethan or Jacobean era, and versions have been found in Great Britain, Denmark, and France.

Its origin is sometimes given as Thomas Heywood's play The Rape of Lucrece, published 1608 and first performed around 1630. This opinion was held by, and may originate with, John Masefield who wrote, "The words of the solo are scarcely fitted for quotation, but those who wish to know what they are like may consult Thomas Heywood's play of 'Valentinian', where a song almost identical, is given at length." — noting in a later article that Valentinian was a mistake and Lucrece was meant. The song referenced by Masefield is probably the one beginning "Did he take fair Lucrece by the toe man? —Toe man. —I man. —Ha, ha, ha, ha man." However, the relationship between Heywood's song and "The Maid of Amsterdam" is contested by some experts, including Stan Hugill. The author of the notes for Sharp Sea Shanties writes, "It too has an amorous encounter with anatomical progression but there, to put it simply, all similarity ends. The presence of a common entertaining theme line does not prove a connection except possibly in the idea itself."

The tune and lyrics of a version entitled "Lee-gangway Chorus (a-roving)" but opening with the familiar "In Amsterdam there dwelt a maid" was included in Naval Songs (1883) by William A Pond. Between 1904 and 1914, the famous English folklorist Cecil Sharp collected many different versions in the coastal areas of Somerset, England, perhaps suggesting that the song was particularly popular there.

== Lyrics ==
The lyrics have many variations. They are often cautionary tales of a sailor's amorous encounter with the Amsterdam maid, who, variably, is married, taking advantage of the sailor for his money, or has the pox. The notes for the Doug Bailey-produced album Short Sharp Shanties claim the most traditional lyrics describe the sailor progressively touching different parts of the maid's body. Regardless of varying lyrics, almost all versions contain the chorus of:

I'll go no more a-rovin' with you, fair maid
A-roving, A-roving, since roving's been my ru-i-in
I'll go no more a-roving with you, fair maid

== Recordings ==
=== Traditional Recordings ===
Folk song collector James Madison Carpenter recorded several versions in the early 1930s, mainly in Scotland and presumably from seamen. Stanley Slade of Bristol, England, known as 'The Last Shantyman', sang a version to folklorist Peter Kennedy in 1943, and the recording is available online via the Vaughan Williams Memorial Library. Kennedy also recorded fishermen at Cadgwith, Cornwall, England, singing a version. Both versions can be heard on the British Library Sound Archive website.

Alan Lomax recorded two versions of the song in the United States, one from Charles J Finger of Washington D.C. in 1937, and another from Captain Richard Maitland in Sailor's Snug Harbor retirement home in Staten Island, New York in 1939. Helen Creighton recorded two versions in Nova Scotia, Canada in the 1940s.

=== Popular Recordings ===
The song has been recorded by various artists, such as operatic baritone Leonard Warren, the Robert Shaw Chorale and Paul Clayton. It was featured on the ending credits of episode two of the 1950s television show The Buccaneers and also as background music on various episodes. It is the 2nd track of the soundtrack of the video game Assassin's Creed IV: Black Flag, and the song can be heard when the main character is sailing the ship. Further a version of it is sung by the sailors in the 1979 TV-movie Mayflower: The Pilgrims' Adventure, as well as by the whalers in the opening of the 1956 film version of Moby Dick.

Philip Seymour Hoffman gives an informal performance of the song in the 2012 film The Master.

It also featured in the medley of music that was played daily on the commencement of programmes on Westward Television.

== Other Recordings ==
- "A Rovin' (Amsterdam Maid)" was recorded by the American quintet Bounding Main and released on their 2005 album Maiden Voyage.
