= The Big Chance (1957 British film) =

1957 British film by Peter Graham Scott

- British film poster
- Directed by: Peter Graham Scott
- Written by: Barbara S. Harper; Peter Graham Scott
- Based on: novel The Big Chance by Pamela Barrington
- Produced by: John Temple-Smith; Francis Edge (uncredited)
- Starring: Adrienne Corri; William Russell; Ian Colin
- Cinematography: Walter J. Harvey
- Edited by: Tom Simpson
- Music by: Eric Spear
- Production company: Major Pictures
- Distributed by: J. Arthur Rank Film Distributors (UK)
- Release date: September 1957 (UK)
- Running time: 59 minutes
- Country: UK
- Language: English

The Big Chance is a 1957 black-and-white British second feature ('B') drama film directed by Peter Graham Scott and starring Adrienne Corri, William Russell, and Ian Colin. It was written by Scott and Barbara S. Harper.

== Plot ==
Bill Anderson is disillusioned with his job as a travel agent and marriage to a wife who is content with a quiet life. When a customer calls to postpone his flight, Anderson decides to escape it all by using the customer's ticket to Panama as booked and assuming the identity of the man, who left his passport because it required renewing. This has conveniently coincided with him having access to his employer's safe which is storage for all the foreign currency used to supply customers leaving the country. He stays late on a Friday night after everybody else has left and, after emptying the safe of the currency, he heads to the airport for his flight to Panama. However, the airport is closed down because of fog, and he meets a woman, Diana, who is also planning to escape from a marriage to a new life.

== Cast ==
- Adrienne Corri as Diana Maxwell
- William Russell as Bill Anderson
- Ian Colin as Adam Maxwell
- Penelope Bartley as Betty Anderson
- Ferdy Mayne as Dimitri Aperghis
- John Rae as Mr. Jarvis
- Mary Jones as Miss Jessop
- Douglas Ives as Stan Willett
- Doris Yorke as Mrs. Willett
- Edwin Richfield as café owner
- Howard Lang as saw mill man
- Peter Swanwick as passport official
- Richard Shaw as airport official
- John Walters as customs man
- Reginald Hearne as customs official
- Robert Raglan as police inspector

== Reception ==
The Monthly Film Bulletin wrote: "Unpretentious and well-played, this slight crime-adventure has one or two effective scenes – notably the one at the airport – but fails to maintain any consistent pitch of excitement."

Picturegoer called the film a "bright little suspense drama", adding: "The Corri part is just a cliché, but, incredibly, she makes the character grow: with complete conviction, the melting romantic is revealed as a hard-faced schemer. Her intelligent performance is matched by a well-judged portrayal from William Russell. And Penelope Bartley has a few poignant moments as the sad little wife."

Picture Show wrote: "Well acted pocket melodrama ... It is a holding film, ably directed."
