= Sidney Cole =

British film and television producer (1908–1998)

Sidney Henry Cole (31 October 1908 – 25 January 1998) was a British film and television producer. Earlier in his career he worked as a film editor. He was born and died in London.

== Biography ==
Cole was educated at the London School of Economics (LSE), and entered the film industry as a scenario reader for Stoll Picture Productions, a company founded by Sir Oswald Stoll. A longstanding friend of director Thorold Dickinson, he edited Dickinson's The High Command (1936) and Gaslight (1940) and Alberto Cavalcanti's Went the Day Well? (1942). Cavalcanti was "a joy" to work with and later in his life Cole remained pleased with his work on the film, stating that it was "very tightly edited by me".

The longest portion of Cole's career though was as a producer, initially credited as an associate producer, for Ealing Studios (where he was employed for eleven years) and the television production company ITC. For ITC he produced Danger Man (US: Secret Agent, 1964–67) and Man in a Suitcase (1967–68). Later he supervised The Adventures of Black Beauty (1972–74) and Dick Turpin (1979–82) for London Weekend Television, the latter via the Gatetarn company he founded with Richard Carpenter and Paul Knight.

Cole was politically engaged through much of his career. He was involved in making documentaries on the Spanish Civil War with Dickinson and employed nearly two-dozen blacklisted American writers on The Adventures of Robin Hood (1955–60), a series whose executive producer Hannah Weinstein had herself chosen exile in London because of McCarthyism. With Peter Proud, Cole founded the ACTT union.

== Selected filmography ==
- Midshipman Easy (editor, 1935)
- The Avenging Hand (editor, 1936)
- The High Command (editor, 1937)
- Gaslight (editor, 1940)
- Went The Day Well? (editor, 1943)
- Scott of the Antarctic (associate producer, 1948)
- Secret People (producer, 1952)
- The Adventures of Robin Hood (producer, 1955)
- The Adventures of Sir Lancelot (producer, 1956)
- The Buccaneers (producer, 1956)
- Sword of Sherwood Forest (producer, 1960)
- Danger Man (producer, US: Secret Agent, 1964–67)
- Man in a Suitcase (producer, 1967)
- The Adventures of Black Beauty (producer, 1972)
- Dick Turpin (producer, 1979)
