= Hannah Weinstein =

American-British television producer (1911–1984)

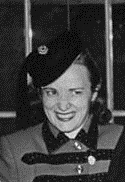
- Born: Hannah Dorner; June 23, 1911; New York City, U.S.
- Died: March 9, 1984 (aged 72); New York City, U.S.
- Occupations: Television producer, journalist, publicist, political activist
- Spouse(s): Pete Weinstein (m. 1938; div. 1955) Jonthan Fisher (m. 1959; div. 1962)
- Children: 3; including Paula

Hannah Weinstein (née Dorner; June 23, 1911 – March 9, 1984) was an American-British journalist, publicist and left-wing political activist who moved to Britain and became a television producer. She is best remembered for having produced The Adventures of Robin Hood television series in the mid-to-late 1950s.

== Early life ==
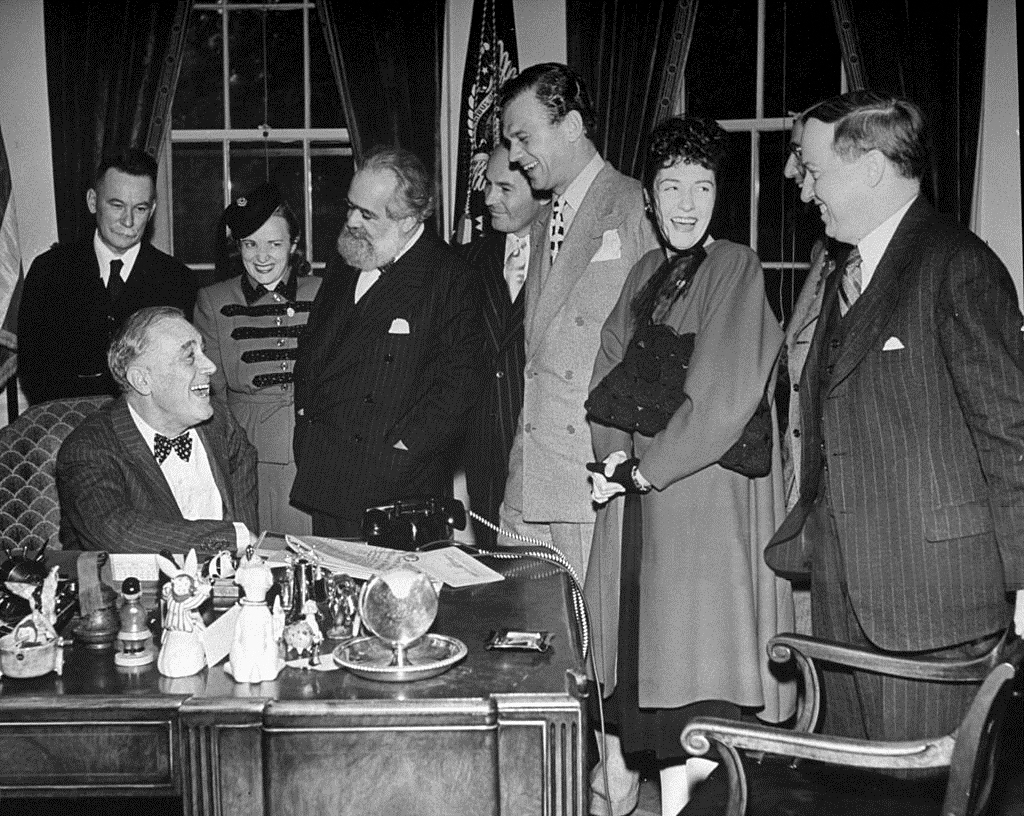
Members of the Independent Voters Committee of the Arts and Sciences for Roosevelt visit FDR at the White House (October 1944). From left: Van Wyck Brooks, Hannah Weinstein, Jo Davidson, Jan Kiepura, Joseph Cotten, Dorothy Gish, Dr. Harlow Shapley

Born to a Jewish family in New York City, after graduating with a degree in journalism from New York University, Weinstein worked for the New York Herald Tribune from 1927. In 1937, she left the newspaper to join Fiorello H. La Guardia's mayoral campaign in New York City. She was also involved in the presidential campaigns of Franklin D. Roosevelt and Henry Wallace. With Ring Lardner Jr., she wrote speeches for Charlie Chaplin and Orson Welles during this period.

== Exile ==
In 1950, Weinstein began her film career in Paris having left the US to avoid the rise of anticommunism, as typified by the House Un-American Activities Committee (HUAC).

In 1952, after settling in London, she established her own production company, Sapphire Films, financially aided by the American Communist Party. The company eventually made series for the British commercial ITV network via an arrangement with ITC's Lew Grade. Weinstein created and executive produced The Adventures of Robin Hood (1955–59), starring Richard Greene. The first two series were syndicated by Official Films to American television stations; they also dwell on the theme of betrayal.

Weinstein created the series with the intention of helping blacklisted American writers. She commissioned scripts by 22 Americans writers blacklisted after being identified as communists by HUAC, such as Waldo Salt, Ring Lardner Jr., Ian McLellan Hunter who all adopted pseudonyms (they were still generally living in Los Angeles and New York City, usually with their passports confiscated), but were paid less than their usual fees.

Weinstein instituted security measures to ensure that the writers' true identities remained secret. Louis Marks, one of the series' script editors later remarked: "Had even a hint of this leaked, the whole enterprise would have foundered". Sonia, Marks' wife who worked as Weinstein's assistant, was told never to accept registered post in case it was a subpoena to appear at a HUAC hearing.

The FBI considered Weinstein a "concealed Communist". It discovered by 1955, via an American embassy agent, that Sapphire Films was "influenced by the communists" but no action against the company is recorded. Director J. Edgar Hoover was aware that the British press was largely in opposition to McCarthyism.

The success of The Adventures of Robin Hood led Weinstein to create a further four television series, The Buccaneers (1956–57), The Adventures of Sir Lancelot (1956–57), Sword of Freedom (1958–60) and The Four Just Men (1959, as Hannah Fisher).

Sapphire Films ceased to function in late 1961 owing to financial problems. Weinstein returned to America in 1962. She organized a rally in Madison Square Garden to raise funds for the election of United States senators opposed to the Vietnam War.

== Later career ==
In 1971, Weinstein founded the Third World Cinema Corporation with Ossie Davis, James Earl Jones and Rita Moreno to produce films with members of minority communities. She produced the Oscar nominated film Claudine (1974), featuring a cast including Diahann Carroll and James Earl Jones, in a story about an African American family struggling through hard times and racism. She later produced Greased Lightning (1977) and Stir Crazy (1980), both of which star comedian Richard Pryor.

In 1982, she was awarded the Women in Film Crystal Award for outstanding women who, through their endurance and the excellence of their work over their lifetime, have helped to expand the role of women within the entertainment industry. In 1984, she was named for the Liberty Hill Foundation Upton Sinclair Award in honor of her artistic and political accomplishments.

== Personal life ==
In 1938, she married Pete Weinstein, a reporter for The Brooklyn Eagle; the couple divorced in 1955. They had three daughters, Dina, Paula (married to Mark Rosenberg), and Lisa.

Weinstein died at age 72 following a heart attack at her home on Park Avenue, New York City on March 9, 1984; services were held at Riverside Memorial Chapel.
