= Paul Hansard =

German actor

- Born: 12 January 1922; Berlin, Germany
- Died: 28 January 2013 (aged 91); England, UK
- Occupation: Actor
- Years active: 1947-1974

Paul Hansard (12 January 1922 – 28 January 2013) was a German-born British actor on both television and film. He was also a puppeteer. On several of his television appearances on both The Buccaneers and The Adventures of Robin Hood, he is shown as a musician, playing the guitar and singing. In 1965, Das Lied im Grünen: German Folksongs was released, featuring him singing traditional German music accompanied by the guitarist Jan Rosol.

== Select film appearances ==
- Portrait from Life (1949) - Fritz (uncredited)
- The Huggetts Abroad (1949) - Assistant Commandant (uncredited)
- La Rosa di Bagdad (1949) - Zirko, Minister of BeautifulThings (English version, voice)
- Murder in the Cathedral (1951) - Peasant
- The One That Got Away (1957) - German Prisoner
- The Guns of Navarone (1961) - German Telephone Operator (uncredited)
- Live It Up! (1963) - Film Director
- Thunderball (1965) - Displaced Persons Agency Clerk (uncredited)
- Operation Crossbow (1965) - German Policeman (uncredited)
- The Heroes of Telemark (1965) - German Officer (uncredited)
- The Quiller Memorandum (1966) - Dr. Loewe (uncredited)
- Submarine X-1 (1968) - Cmdr. Steiner (uncredited)
- Oh! What a Lovely War (1969) - German Officer (uncredited)
- Battle of Britain (1969) - Karl (uncredited)
- Trog (1970) - Dr. Kurtlimer (uncredited)
- The Private Life of Sherlock Holmes (1970) - Monk
- Slaughterhouse-Five (1972) - German Photographer (uncredited)
- Gold (1974) - Syndicate Member (final film role)

== Television appearances ==
- The Adventures of Robin Hood: 7 episodes (1956-1958) - Various Characters
- The Buccaneers: 36 episodes (1956-1957) - Taffy / Alfie

“The Last Train”.“Scotland Yard” (TV series), 1 episode, 1959. Police Official.

- Col March of Scotland Yard ( TV series): Rene, "Passage at Arms". 1953

== Stage ==
- Twelfth Night by W Shakespeare (Old Vic Company/British Council): Sebastiano. Teatro Comunale Giuseppe Verdi, Trieste, June 1950
