= Sapphire Films =

British television production company

Sapphire Films Ltd.
- Industry: Television production
- Founder: Hannah Weinstein

Sapphire Films Ltd. was a British television production company, active from 1955 until 1961. Amongst their best-known series are The Adventures of Robin Hood, The Adventures of Sir Lancelot, The Buccaneers, The Four Just Men and Sword of Freedom, produced for Lew Grade's ITC and screened on ITV in the UK, as well as being syndicated in the United States.

Sapphire Films was founded by producer Hannah Weinstein with initial funds from the Hollywood branch of the Communist Party USA. Weinstein hired nearly two-dozen blacklisted American writers to script The Adventures of Robin Hood (and later The Four Just Men) under pseudonyms, and instituted elaborate security measures to ensure that the writers' true identities remained secret.

Sapphire Films ceased to function in late 1961 owing to financial problems caused by Weinstein's then husband, Jonthan Fisher.

== Television Productions ==
This list may not be complete

Year	Title	Episodes
1955-1959	The Adventures of Robin Hood	143
1956-1957	The Adventures of Sir Lancelot	30
1956-1957	The Buccaneers	39
1958-1961	Sword of Freedom	39
1959-1960	The Four Just Men	39
