= Peter Bennett (actor) =

British actor (1917–1989)

Peter Bennett (17 September 1917 – 23 December 1989) was a British stage and television actor. He had served on both the National Council for Drama Training and the British Actors' Equity Association.

== Biography ==
Peter Egerton Bennett was born in Chelsea, London, England, on 17 September 1917. His father was a Major in the British Army and a recipient of the Military Cross. Bennett attended Malvern College and trained for the stage at the Royal Academy of Dramatic Art. Peter Bennett married Sheila Bramwell-Jones. He died in London on 23 December 1989.

== Career ==
Peter Bennett made his first stage appearance on 27 January 1936 as Ma Ta in a stage adaptation of Lady Precious Stream at the Pleasure Gardens Theatre in Folkestone, England. His first appearance in London theatre was on 9 May 1936 as Possum and Ed Sweet in a production of Little Ol' Boy at the Arts Theatre. Bennett made his first and only Broadway theatre performance as Corporal Cramp in the short-lived January 1947 production of Love Goes to Press at the Biltmore Theatre. Other major venues at which Bennett performed include the Westminster Theatre, the Ambassadors Theatre, Embassy Theatre, and the Richmond Theatre.

From 1970 through 1980, Peter Bennett was a council member and Vice President of the British Actors' Equity Association, known as Equity. In 1975, he served as the director for the Festival of British Theatre. In 1979, he was appointed to the National Council for Drama Training.

== Film and television ==
Bennett appeared in more than 200 films and television productions, including The Adventures of Robin Hood and The Six Wives of Henry VIII on TV, and the films of Carry On Constable (1960), Tarka the Otter (1979) and Lady Chatterley's Lover (1981). In addition to these, he also appeared in the following TV series in the 1960s: Probation Officer, Unwelcome Stranger, Magnolia Buildings, Z-Cars, Maigret, Compact, Misleading Cases and The Troubleshooters.
