= Max Faulkner (actor) =

British actor (1931–2010)

- Born: Cathal Maxwell Parnell Macaulay Lloyd Faulkner; 1931; Croydon, Surrey, England
- Died: 13 February 2010 (aged 78–79); Haverfordwest, Pembrokeshire, Wales
- Occupation(s): Television actor and stuntman

Max Faulkner was a British stuntman and actor.

== Career ==
Max Faulkner did stunt/double work in The Adventures of Robin Hood and appeared as a clerk in one episode but, was mainly known for his credited work on Doctor Who during the 1970s where he appeared in The Ambassadors of Death (as a UNIT soldier), The Monster of Peladon (as a miner), Planet of the Spiders (as a Guard Captain), Genesis of the Daleks (as a Thal Guard), The Android Invasion (as Corporal Adams), The Sun Makers as one of Mandrel's rebels, and The Invasion of Time (as Nesbin). He also served as the fight arranger for The Hand of Fear.

== Selected filmography ==
- I Was Monty's Double (1958) - British Sentry (uncredited)
- A Night to Remember (1958) - Steward (uncredited)
- Carve Her Name with Pride (1958) - German officer in train corridor (uncredited)
- Danger Within (1959) - Hamlet Play POW (uncredited)
- The Giant Behemoth (1959) - PLA Radio Operator (uncredited)
- Gorgo (1960) - Messenger (uncredited)
- Out of the Shadow (1961)
- The Third Alibi (1961) - Det. Sgt. Fred Smith (uncredited)
- Crosstrap (1962) - Ricky
- The Silent Invasion (1962) - Curt
- Gang War (1962) - Chuck
- Richard the Lionheart (1962-1963, TV Series) - De Fleury
- That Kind of Girl (1963) - Johnson
- Dr. Crippen (1963) - Radio Officer Andrews (uncredited)
- The Ipcress File (1965) - Prison Guard
- The Intelligence Men (1965) - Stagehand (uncredited)
- The Brigand of Kandahar (1965) - Various Soldiers (uncredited)
- Bedazzled (1967) - Priest (uncredited)
- Hammerhead (1968) - Security Service Man (uncredited)
- Salt and Pepper (1968) - Lieutenant
- Star! (1968) - Corp. Cooper (uncredited)
- Where Eagles Dare (1968) - Oberschutze (uncredited)
- Perfect Friday (1970) - Strong Room Guard
- See No Evil (1971) - Steve's Man #1
- The Day of the Jackal (1973) - Special Branch Detective (uncredited)
- Carry On Dick (1974) - Highwayman (uncredited)
- Trial by Combat (1976) - Sir Harold Carslake
- The Bawdy Adventures of Tom Jones (1976) - Gentleman of the Hunt (uncredited)
- Tarka the Otter (1979) - Ferreter
- Top Secret! (1984) - East German Dignitary (uncredited)
- GoldenEye (1995) - Guard at Helicopter Show (uncredited) (final film role)
