= John Dearth =

British actor (1920–1984)

- Born: Kenneth Paton; 16 October 1920; West Ham, London, England
- Died: 17 March 1984 (aged 63); Hackney, London, England
- Occupation: Actor

John Dearth (born Kenneth Paton; 16 October 1920 – 17 March 1984) was an English actor, known for playing numerous roles in nearly 30 episodes of ITV series The Adventures of Robin Hood.

He is also remembered for playing two villains in science fiction series Doctor Who: firstly voicing the maniacal supercomputer BOSS in Season 10 finale The Green Death and then portraying the greedy Lupton in the following season finale Planet of the Spiders.

Other television appearances include Dixon of Dock Green, The Adventures of William Tell, The Four Just Men, Emergency Ward 10, The Escape of R.D.7, No Hiding Place, The Avengers (Propellant 23), The Saint, Z-Cars, Theatre 625, Softly, Softly, The Wednesday Play, Justice, Thirty-Minute Theatre, Play of the Month, Angels, Treasure Island, Play for Today and Kessler. Dearth was also a member of the BBC Radio Repertory Company during the 1960s.

== Theatre ==
Initially, Dearth began his acting career in theatre, firstly as a regular performer with Reginald Salberg's Players in Preston before joining Nottingham Playhouse on his 30th birthday, playing Slender in The Merry Wives of Windsor followed by Willy Loman in Death of a Salesman. After a working trip to America in 1951 appearing in Caesar and Cleopatra/Antony and Cleopatra on Broadway, he returned to England the following year and performed at the Connaught Theatre in Worthing. He made his debut as a mythical god in Isle of Umbrellas as well as playing Iago in Othello. He left to join The Old Vic theatre company, playing Guildenstern in Hamlet at the Edinburgh Festival, as well as being an understudy to Richard Burton in the title role. More performances followed at the Old Vic with Burton (where Dearth became friends with the Welshman).

== Personal life ==
In 1959, Dearth lost a part in the film A Touch of Larceny, fired by the producer, Ivan Foxwell, who felt he bore too much of a resemblance to leading man James Mason. According to Barry Letts, this experience embittered Dearth for the rest of his life. Personal problems meant he found work difficult to come by later in life. The actor was known to be a heavy drinker which may have resulted in his untimely death. Letts described Dearth as "a lovely man, but ruined by drink."

Dearth's daughter was the actress Lynn Dearth (1946–1994).

== Filmography ==
- The Flying Scot a.k.a. The Mailbag Robbery (1957) – Father
- Dangerous Exile (1957) – Simon the Jailer (uncredited)
- Breakout (1959) – Lt. Robson
- Look Back in Anger (1959) – Pet Stall Man
- The Wreck of the Mary Deare (1959) – Reporter (uncredited)
- The Young Jacobites (1960) – Sergeant
- Dead Lucky (1960) – Torrance
- Circle of Deception (1960) – Captain Ormrod
- The Shadow of the Cat (1961) – Constable Hamer (uncredited)
- The Day the Earth Caught Fire (1961) – Dick (uncredited)
- Three Spare Wives (1962) – News Editor
- The Road to Hong Kong (1962) – Leader's Man (uncredited)
- Strongroom (1962) – Police Sergeant Hopkins
- The Runaway (1964) – Sgt. Hardwick
