= Lardner =

Lardner is a surname. Notable people with the surname include:

- David Lardner (1919–1944), American war correspondent
- Dionysius Lardner (1793–1859), Irish scientific writer
- Demi Lardner, Australian comedian
- James Lardner (politician) (1879–1925), Irish Nationalist Member of the UK Parliament
- James L. Lardner (1802–1881), American Civil War admiral
- John Lardner (born 1973), Scottish snooker player
- John Lardner (sports writer) (1912–1960), American sports journalist
- Kym Lardner (born 1957), Australian children's author, illustrator, and storyteller
- Larry Lardner, Brigade Commandant for the Irish Republican Army
- Nathanial Lardner (1684–1768), English theologian
- Rebecca Lardner (born 1971), English artist
- Ring Lardner (1885–1933), American writer
- Ring Lardner Jr. (1915–2000), American screenwriter

== See also ==
- Lardner, Victoria, a locality
