= Silvia Schulman =

Hollywood insider and author of satirical novel about Hollywood

- Born: March 3, 1913; Manhattan, New York City, New York, U.S.
- Died: February 19, 1993 (aged 79); St. Augustine, Florida, U.S.
- Education: Hunter College
- Occupations: Writer, secretary, designer, building contractor
- Spouse: Ring Lardner Jr. (m. 1937; div. 1945)
- Children: 2
- Parent(s): David Schulman, Sarah Schulman
- Relatives: James, John, David (brothers)

Silvia Schulman (March 3, 1913 – February 19, 1993) was an American writer, interior designer, and building contractor. During the 1930s, she worked for the Hollywood film studios RKO Pictures, Metro-Goldwyn-Mayer, and later Selznick International Pictures as a secretary. She was producer David O. Selznick's personal assistant until February 1937, when she quit to marry screenwriter Ring Lardner Jr. During their honeymoon, she began to write a comic novel based upon her Hollywood experiences, and later enlisted the help of freelance writer Jane Shore. In 1938, I Lost My Girlish Laughter was published under the pseudonym Jane Allen.

== Biography ==
Silvia Schulman was born in Manhattan to Russian Jewish parents David and Sarah Schulman in 1913. Both of her parents emigrated from Minsk. She attended Hunter College, but left before graduation to take a job at RKO's New York office. She later moved to Los Angeles, where she met David O. Selznick. She took a job at Metro-Goldwyn-Mayer with Selznick, and in 1935, when Selznick left to form his own company, Schulman accepted a position as his personal assistant. She worked with him on David Copperfield (1935), Little Lord Fauntleroy (1936), The Garden of Allah (1936), and A Star Is Born (1937).

In 1936, Schulman, along with Kay Brown and literary agent Annie Laurie Williams, was instrumental in persuading Selznick to purchase Margaret Mitchell's novel Gone with the Wind. In February 1937, she left Selznick International to marry publicist and screenwriter Ring Lardner Jr. and began writing her novel. Later that year, she asked Jane Shore to help polish her material for a New York publisher. Annie Laurie Williams, Margaret Mitchell's agent, acted for them. The novel was serialized first and then published by Random House in 1938.

I Lost My Girlish Laughter is told in a series of letters, telegrams, news articles, and diary entries by "a smart and sassy narrator"—Hollywood secretary Madge Lawrence. Many supporting characters were based on real Hollywood people. Selznick appeared as crass producer Sidney Brand, actress Marlene Dietrich was parodied as a snobby foreign star called Sarya Tarn, and Kay Brown, journalist Louella Parsons, and agent Leland Hayward also made cameo appearances under pseudonyms. The novel's publication created quite a scandal, and although many critics hoped for a film adaptation, the studio producers blackballed the book.

Schulman and Lardner had two children, Peter Lardner (1938-) and Ann Waswo (1940-2020). Although Lardner would become one of Hollywood's most highly regarded writers, most of Schulman's former Hollywood associates shunned her for satirizing the studio system. Schulman and Lardner divorced in 1945. Schulman became an interior designer and building contractor in the 1940s and 1950s, based in Newport Beach, California and Phoenix, Arizona. She died in 1993 of cancer.
