= USS Lardner =

Two ships of the United States Navy have been named USS Lardner in honor of James L. Lardner.

- USS Lardner (DD-286), was a Clemson-class destroyer, commissioned in 1919 and decommissioned in 1930
- USS Lardner (DD-487), was a Gleaves-class destroyer, commissioned in 1942 and decommissioned in 1946. She was transferred to the Turkish Navy where she served as Gemlik (D-347).
