= Frances Chaney =

American actress (1915–2004)

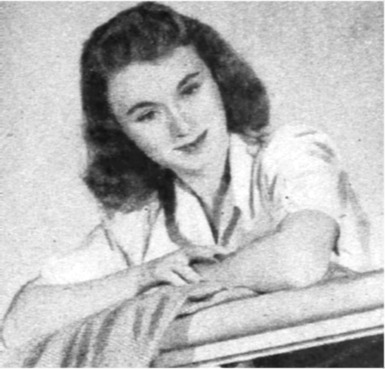
- Chaney in 1945
- Born: Fanya Lipetz; July 23, 1915; Odessa, Russian Empire
- Died: November 23, 2004 (aged 89); New York City, U.S.
- Occupation: Actress
- Spouses: David Lardner (m. 1941; died 1944); Ring Lardner Jr. (m. 1946; died 2000)
- Children: 2 sons, 1 daughter

Frances Chaney (born Fanya Lipetz; July 23, 1915 – November 23, 2004) was an actress who appeared on radio, stage, and early television. However, she is perhaps best known for being blacklisted along with her "Hollywood Ten" husband, Ring Lardner Jr. She resumed work after the blacklist and obtained small roles in TV episodes and films.

== Biography ==
=== Early life ===
The daughter of Leon Lipetz, Chaney was born Fanya Lipetz (Russian: Фаня Леоновна Липец) on July 23, 1915, in Odessa, Russian Empire (present-day Ukraine). Her family soon moved to Istanbul, where she attended an English school. While still a child, she emigrated with her family to the U.S., and settled in the Bronx, New York.

She attended Hunter College, but eventually dropped out to take a job at Macy's department store and gained an evening apprenticeship at Provincetown Playhouse in New York City. That led to her getting a scholarship at the Neighborhood Playhouse School of the Theatre, also in New York City, where she studied acting for two years. After finishing at the school, she changed her name to Frances Chaney, thinking that producers would be more likely to hire her that way than if she used her Russian name.

=== Acting career ===
Chaney's first professional acting jobs were on radio programs in the late 1930s. She regularly appeared on Gang Busters and Mr. District Attorney. She played the "Burma" character on Terry and the Pirates. She co-starred in House in the Country, a serial on NBC-Blue (1941-1942). She portrayed Marion Kerby on The Adventures of Topper.

During World War II, she acted in programs produced by the Armed Forces Radio Service. An article about her in the November 1945 issue of Radio Romances noted: "Busy as she was, Frances frequently gave up important roles – high-paying roles – in order to appear on the radio shows put on by the Armed Forces Radio Service. She worked steadily on the Assignment Home series, for instance, giving that preference over any other shows."

Chaney also began acting on the New York stage. She had a leading part in the Broadway production of Irwin Shaw's The Assassin (1945).

=== Marriages ===
In 1941, Chaney married David Lardner, a journalist and the son of famous American author Ring Lardner. They had a son and daughter. While serving as a World War II correspondent for The New Yorker magazine, David Lardner was killed in France shortly after D-Day, when a land mine exploded under a jeep he was riding in.

Chaney subsequently married David's brother, the Academy Award-winning screenwriter Ring Lardner Jr., on September 28, 1946, in Las Vegas, Nevada, and they remained wed until his death in 2000; they had one son.

=== Blacklisting ===
In 1947, Ring Lardner Jr. was one of the "Hollywood Ten" screenwriters and directors who refused to cooperate with the House Un-American Activities Committee's investigation into subversion in the film industry. The ten men were cited for contempt of Congress and served 6–12 month sentences in federal prison. After Lardner was released from prison, he and his family lived in Mexico for a short while before moving to Connecticut in July 1952. Since Chaney herself was never subpoenaed by the HUAC, most historical accounts label her as being "graylisted" during this time through guilt by association with her husband. However, she later insisted she was blacklisted for her own prior left-wing activities, such as collecting money for Spanish Civil War refugees.

In September 1952, she managed to land an important supporting role (she assumed it was due to an urgent need to cast somebody quickly) as the Jewish cantor's unmarried niece in the "Holiday Song" episode of The Philco Television Playhouse. The episode, written by Paddy Chayevsky, received positive notices and the show's producer Fred Coe sent Chaney a note saying she was now "an official member of Philco Playhouse." By spring of 1953, Chayevsky had authored a new Philco Playhouse script, "Marty", with a part written especially for Chaney. She was asked to come to New York to give her script approval. Then, as she explained in a 1980s interview, "the process started":

We can't get hold of Mr. Coe. Would you call again? We have to get him in East Hampton. It wasn't until the end of the day that they finally said they were very sorry. They'd made a terrible mistake. Somebody else had been cast in the part. And I wasn't sure. I wasn't sure that it might, indeed, have been a terrible mistake—until the following summer.

That's when she learned that "Holiday Song" was going to be performed again on Philco Playhouse, with every single cast member returning from the September 1952 broadcast, except for Chaney.

In the ensuing years, she did sporadic stage work. She understudied for actresses Claudette Colbert, Kim Stanley, and Maureen Stapleton. She appeared in a short-lived Broadway production of The Lovers in 1956, and in the Ben Hecht play, Winkelberg, in 1958.

In a 1997 retrospective article, her son James Lardner argued that in some ways, his mother had a harder struggle under the blacklist than his more publicized father. As an actress, she was completely barred from appearing on screen, whereas his father obtained a few writing assignments in the 1950s, mostly for British TV series, by using pseudonyms.

Chaney's return to television came in the late 1950s when she was cast in the daytime soap opera, The Edge of Night." It was a recurring role that brought her back for four more episodes in the 1960s. She acted again on Broadway in Seidman and Son (1962) and then later in Golda (1977). She also had off-Broadway acting jobs, such as in the Clifford Odets play Awake and Sing, Anton Chekhov's Three Sisters, and the James Lapine-directed Table Settings.

=== Later years ===
Starting in the 1980s, Chaney worked more steadily in TV and film. She was a witch in the pilot episode of Tales from the Darkside (1983). She portrayed a long-married wife in the documentary portion of When Harry Met Sally... (1989). She appeared in two episodes of Law & Order, and had a minor supporting role in Life with Mikey (1993).

Chaney died of Alzheimer's disease on November 23, 2004, in New York City. She was 89.

== Filmography ==
Year	Title	Role	Notes
1951	The Underworld Story	Grace	
1951	When I Grow Up	Mrs. Kelly	
1951	Saturday's Hero	Nurse	Uncredited
1952	Schlitz Playhouse of Stars	Unnamed	"The Von Linden File" episode
1952	The Philco Television Playhouse	Naomi	"Holiday Song"
1958- 1969	The Edge of Night	Jeanne Culpepper	Five episodes
1959	Deadline	Betty Azbell	One episode
1964/ 1965	The Patty Duke Show	Mrs. Parker; Miss Blake	Two episodes
1973	The Seven-Ups	Sara Kalish	
1983	Tales from the Darkside	Witch	Pilot episode
1989	Paint It Black	Mrs. Russell	
1989	When Harry Met Sally...	Documentary Couple #6	
1990	The Marshall Chronicles	Leslie's Grandmother	One episode
1992/ 1993	Law & Order	Amelia Whitney; Mrs. Siddons	Two episodes
1993	Life with Mikey	Mrs. Cantrell	
1993	The Saint of Fort Washington	Woman in Window	
