= Haircut (disambiguation) =

Haircut refers to the styling of hair.

Haircut may also refer to:

- Haircut (finance), difference between loan amount and collateral value
- The Haircut, a 1982 film directed by Tamar Simon Hoffs
- Haircut (film), a 1995 film directed by Joaquim Sapinho
- Haircut (album), a 1993 album by George Thorogood
- Haircut (short story), a short story by Ring Lardner
- Hair Cut (song), a 2022 single by Xdinary Heroes
