= James Lardner =

James or Jim Lardner may refer to:

- James L. Lardner (1802–1881), American naval officer
- James Lardner (politician) (1879–1925), Irish nationalist politician
- James Lardner (Cobra), a fictional character in the Marvel Comics universe
