= Hugh Keough =

American sports journalist

Hugh E. Keough (January 24, 1864 – June 9, 1912) was a Chicago sportswriter who worked as a journalist for 31 years, from the age of 17 until his death. He was born in Hamilton, Canada West.

== Journalist ==
He worked for the Hamilton Spectator and with newspapers in Indianapolis, Indiana and Logansport, Indiana, before coming to Chicago in the 1880s. He became sports editor of the Chicago Times prior to taking similar positions with the San Francisco Chronicle and the New Orleans Item.

As a writer for the Chicago Tribune, Keough wrote the "In the Wake of the News" column (he often signed off with the monogram "HEK") and a Sunday edition feature, "Offside Plays." At various times "In the Wake of the News" was written by Ring Lardner, Arch Ward, Hugh Fullerton, Jack Lait, and Harvey Woodruff.

Keough is credited with authoring the quip, "The race is not always to the swift, nor the battle to the strong; but that is the best way to bet," a derivation from much earlier variations of the phrase.

== Horse racing enthusiast ==
Keough was an official at horse racing tracks in the Southern United States and Midwest (United States) for many years. Most notably he was affiliated with Washington Park, Chicago and other Chicago tracks.

Following a decline in midwestern horse racing Keough returned to journalism as managing editor of the Lake County Times in Hammond, Indiana. He maintained a permanent position with the Chicago Tribune from 1906 until the end of his life.

== Death ==
He died at his home in Chicago after a six-week struggle with pneumonia, in 1912. He underwent two operations to attempt to alleviate a throat condition which prevented him from swallowing. Keough was survived by his wife, the former Bertha Atherton, of Dubuque, Iowa. They were married in 1898.
