= Philip Rapp =

American film and television director, screenwriter (1907–1996)

- Born: March 26, 1907; Kingston upon Hull, UK
- Died: January 23, 1996 (aged 88); Beverly Hills, California, U.S.
- Occupations: Film and television director, screenwriter
- Years active: 1936–1965
- Children: Joel Rapp

Philip Rapp (March 26, 1907 – January 23, 1996) was a film and television director and screenwriter.

== Early life ==
Rapp was born in Kingston upon Hull, United Kingdom. He was the son of Maurice Rapp (1876–1949) and Anna Rapp (née Waldman, 1881–1972), both of whom were born in Buchach, Ukraine.

== Career ==
Rapp wrote for Eddie Cantor and, for a brief period, wrote film scripts for Danny Kaye. Rapp was the creator of Baby Snooks and The Bickersons. Rapp was a writer, director, and producer, and he directed a popular long-running radio series called The Battling Bickersons. He introduced the Baby Snooks character for Fanny Brice of the Ziegfeld Follies. He also directed episodes of the television series Topper.

He died on January 23, 1996, in Beverly Hills, California.

== Selected filmography ==
=== Director ===
- Star Time (1950–1951)
- Topper (1 episode, 1954)
- The Adventures of Hiram Holliday (8 episodes, 1956–1959)

=== Producer ===
- The Adventures of Hiram Holliday (9 episodes, 1956–1959)

=== Writer ===
- Strike Me Pink (1936)
- Start Cheering (1938)
- Wonder Man (1945)
- Ziegfeld Follies (1946)
- The Inspector General (1949)
- Topper (19 episodes, 1954–1955)
- The Adventures of Hiram Holliday (8 episodes, 1956–1959)
- Wild and Wonderful (1964)
- My Favorite Martian (1 episode, 1965)
