= The Adventures of Topper =

Radio situation comedy

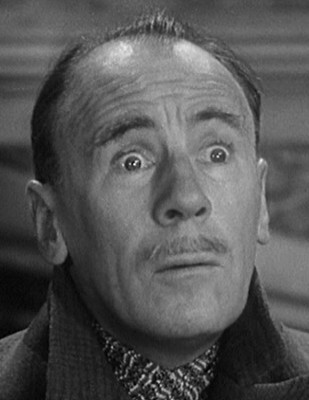
- Roland Young as Cosmo Topper (from the film Topper Returns).
- Country of origin: United States
- Language: English
- TV adaptations: Topper
- Starring: Roland Young
- Announcer: Richard Kollmar
- Original release: June 7 – September 13, 1945
- Sponsored by: Post Toasties cereal Maxwell House coffee

The Adventures of Topper is a radio situation comedy in the United States. It was broadcast on NBC June 7 – September 13, 1945, as a summer replacement for Dinah Shore's program.

== Format ==
The 30-minute program was based on characters created by novelist Thorne Smith. Cosmo Topper, a businessman, bought the house that had been inhabited by George and Marian Kerby before they died. He had no idea that the Kerbys' ghosts haunted the house. Confusion arose because only Topper could see the ghosts, leading his wife to wonder why he spoke to people who apparently were not there.

David C. Tucker, in his book, The Women Who Made Television Funny: Ten Stars of 1950s Sitcoms, cited the program's ghost-based premise as one reason for its lack of success: "As noted by Variety's reviewer, however, a comedy centered on the antics of appearing and disappearing ghosts 'reads good on paper and was even enhanced in the film treatment,' but played less well on radio, resulting in a show he found 'singularly unfunny.'"

The program was sponsored by Post Toasties cereal and Maxwell House coffee. Only 3 of the 13 episodes have survived.

== Personnel ==
Characters in the program and the actors who played them are shown in the table below.

Character	Actor
Cosmo Topper	Roland Young
Malvena Topper or Henrietta Topper	Hope Emerson
George Kerby	Paul Mann; Tony Barrett
Marian Kerby or Marion Kerby	Frances Chaney
Heliatrope	Bob Corley
Mr. Borris	Ed Latimer

Source: Radio Programs, 1924–1984: A Catalog of More Than 1800 Shows, except as noted.

The announcer was Richard Kollmar.

== See also ==
- Topper (film)
- Topper (TV series)
