= Topper (TV series) =

1953 American fantasy television series

- Alpha Video's DVD
- Genre: Fantasy sitcom
- Based on: Topper by Thorne Smith
- Written by: Robert Riley Crutcher; Stanley Davis; Donn Mullally; George Oppenheimer; Elon Packard; Norman Paul; Joel Rapp; Stephen Sondheim; Robert Thomsen
- Directed by: Richard L. Bare; Leslie Goodwins; James V. Kern; Lew Landers; Paul Landres; Leslie H. Martinson; Philip Rapp
- Starring: Anne Jeffreys; Robert Sterling; Leo G. Carroll; Lee Patrick
- Theme music composer: Roy Ingraham; Charles Koff; Edward Paul
- Country of origin: United States
- Original language: English
- No. of seasons: 2
- No. of episodes: 78

Production
- Producers: John W. Loveton; Bernard L. Schubert
- Production locations: Hal Roach Studios, Culver City, Calif.
- Cinematography: Gert Andersen; Kenneth Peach; William P. Whitley
- Editors: Nick DeMaggio; Chuck Gladden
- Running time: 24 minutes

Original release
- Network: CBS
- Release: October 9, 1953 – July 15, 1955

Topper is an American fantasy sitcom television series based on the 1937 film Topper, which was based on the two novels Topper and Topper Takes a Trip by Thorne Smith. The series was broadcast on CBS from October 9, 1953, to July 15, 1955, and stars Leo G. Carroll in the title role. It finished at #24 in the Nielsen ratings for the 1954–1955 season. Topper also earned an Emmy nomination for Best Situation Comedy in 1954.

== Synopsis ==
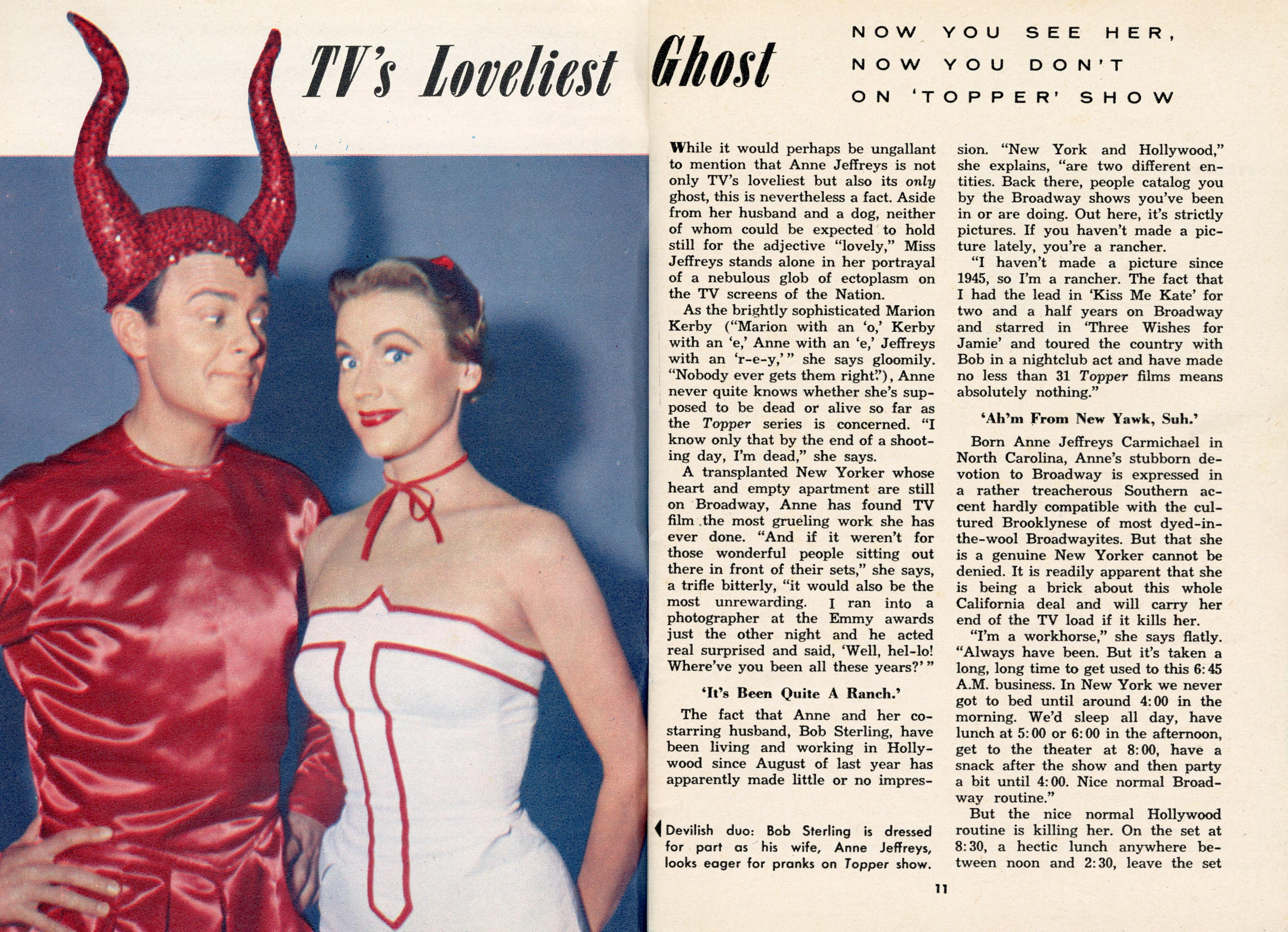
Robert Sterling as George Kerby and Anne Jeffreys as Marion Kerby in TV Guide, June 4, 1954

Sophisticated but stuffy Cosmo Topper (Carroll) is the vice president of City Bank, married to sweet but rather clueless Henrietta (Lee Patrick). They live in a Los Angeles house they bought from the estate of a young couple, George and Marion Kerby (real life husband and wife Robert Sterling and Anne Jeffreys). The Kerbys died while skiing when they were buried by an avalanche. A St. Bernard dog, Neil, who attempted to rescue them also died with them. Topper discovers his new home is haunted by the ghosts of the former occupants as well as Neil. Strangely, he is the only one able to see or hear them. Neil, the St. Bernard, loves martinis and a running gag is the invisible dog lapping up the drink.

The Kerbys try to bring some excitement and joy into the life of stodgy and conservative Topper. The ghosts cause strange (but humorous) events to happen, which an embarrassed Cosmo has to try to explain to others baffled – and even frightened – by them.

== Cast ==
=== Main ===
- Anne Jeffreys as Marion Kerby
- Robert Sterling as George Kerby
- Leo G. Carroll as Cosmo Topper
- Lee Patrick as Henrietta Topper
- Buck as Neil

=== Recurring ===
- Thurston Hall as Mr. Schuyler, President of City Bank
- Kathleen Freeman as Katie (season 1)
- Edna Skinner as Maggie (season 2)

== Production ==
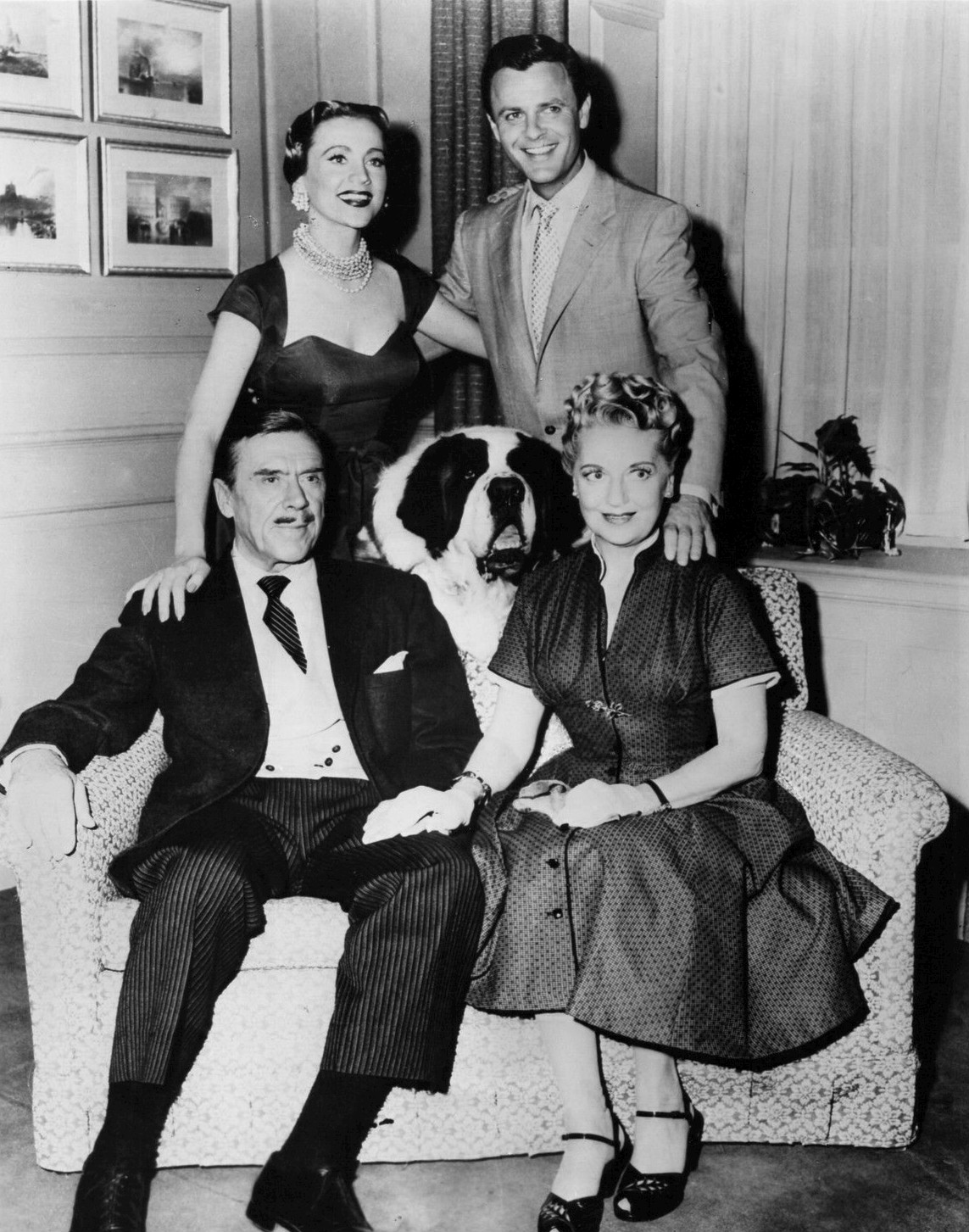
Main cast in 1953.

The very young, aspiring Broadway composer and lyricist Stephen Sondheim wrote eleven episodes for Topper's first season with George Oppenheimer. The show's producer was John W. Loveton, with his agent, Bernard L. Schubert, credited as co-producer.

R.J. Reynolds Tobacco's Camel cigarettes was the show's sponsor; the Kerbys were seen smoking in every episode, as required by Reynolds; the actors, along with Carroll, also appeared in integrated commercials promoting the product at the end of the show, as well as announcing where free cartons of Camels were being sent to various military bases and veterans hospitals each week. ABC aired repeats of these episodes in 1956.

There were at least three forms of the opening announcement: "Camel – America's first choice among cigarettes – presents Topper. Starring – as Marion Kerby, the loveliest ghost in town – Anne Jeffreys. As George Kerby, the liveliest ghost in town – Robert Sterling. And Leo G. Carroll as Topper [a dog bark is heard]. Oh, yes, and ahh... the deadliest ghost, Neil".

In another opening, the announcer adds, "And there are only three people in the world who can see or hear them – you and I... and Cosmo Topper".

When Topper was shown in repeats, Anne Jeffreys was introduced as "the ghostess with the mostest"; Robert Sterling as "that most sporty spirit", and Leo G. Carroll as "host to said ghosts".

== Episodes ==
=== Season 1 (1953–54) ===
No. overall	No. in season	Title	Directed by	Written by	Original release date
1	1	"Topper Meets the Ghosts"	Philip Rapp	George Oppenheimer and Philip Rapp	October 9, 1953
With Lyle Talbot as Mr. Moulton
2	2	"The Movers"	Philip Rapp	George Oppenheimer, Stephen Sondheim	October 16, 1953
3	3	"Hiring the Maid"	Philip Rapp	George Oppenheimer and Stephen Sondheim	October 23, 1953
With Barbara Knudsen as Lola / Kathleen Freeman as Katie
4	4	"The Hypnotist"	Philip Rapp	George Oppenheimer	October 30, 1953
With Maude Prickett as Amelia
5	5	"Reducing"	Philip Rapp	George Oppenheimer	November 6, 1953
With Steve Reeves as Joe Manurki
6	6	"The Spinster"	Philip Rapp	George Oppenheimer	November 13, 1953
With Mary Field as Thelma Gibney / Hugh Beaumont as Ed Merrill / Lewis Martin as Dr. Lang
7	7	"Bank Securities"	Philip Rapp	George Oppenheimer	November 20, 1953
With Thurston Hall as Mr. Schuyler / Clancy Cooper as Upperson
8	8	"The Kid"	Philip Rapp	George Oppenheimer	November 27, 1953
With Kathleen Freeman as Katie / Ann Doran as Mrs. Welch / Billy Chapin as Timmy Welch
9	9	"Burglar"	Philip Rapp	George Oppenheimer / Stephen Sondheim and Hendrik Vollaerts / Story by Robert Thomsen	December 4, 1953
With Ed Dearing as Chief McGraw / Jess Kirkpatrick as The Burglar
10	10	"Uncle Jonathan"	Philip Rapp	George Oppenheimer	December 11, 1953
11	11	"The Car Story"	Leslie Goodwins	George Oppenheimer, Philip Rapp, Stephen Sondheim	December 18, 1953
12	12	"Christmas Carol"	Paul Landres	George Oppenheimer	December 25, 1953
With Kathleen Freeman as Katie / Mary Field as Thelma Gibney / Frank Ferguson as Dr. Lang / uncredited: Billy Chapin as Neighborhood Boy and Tiny Tim in Dream
13	13	"Masquerade"	Lew Landers	George Oppenheimer, Robert Thomsen	January 1, 1954
14	14	"Second Honeymoon"	Philip Rapp	George Oppenheimer / Story by Donn Mullally	January 8, 1954
With Mary Field as Thelma Gibney / Guy Wilkerson as Luke / Juney Ellis as Miss Loomis
15	15	"The Socialite"	Philip Rapp	George Oppenheimer and Stephen Sondheim	January 15, 1954
With Natalie Schafer as Mrs. Vance / John Eldredge as Mr. Vance
16	16	"The Surprise Party"	Lew Landers	George Oppenheimer	January 22, 1954
17	17	"Decorating"	Lew Landers	George Oppenheimer and Stephen Sondheim	January 29, 1954
With Kathleen Freeman as Katie / Mary Field as Thelma Gibney / Paul Bryar as Mr. Charles
18	18	"Astrology"	Lew Landers	George Oppenheimer, Stephen Sondheim	February 5, 1954
19	19	"Trip to Lisbon"	Lew Landers	Stephen Sondheim and George Oppenheimer	February 12, 1954
With Thurston Hall as Mr. Schuyler / Hugh Sanders as Mr. Devon / Angela Greene as Mrs. Devon / Lillian Bronson as Miss Erskine / William Walker as The Porter
20	20	"The Proposal"	Lew Landers	George Oppenheimer	February 19, 1954
With Kathleen Freeman as Katie / James Parnell as The Policeman
21	21	"Katie's Nephew"	Unknown	George Oppenheimer	February 26, 1954
22	22	"College Reunion"	Lew Landers	Norman Paul	March 5, 1954
23	23	"Economy"	Unknown	Unknown	March 12, 1954
24	24	"The Diamond Ring"	Leslie Goodwins	Philip Rapp	March 19, 1954
25	25	"Topper Runs for Mayor"	Paul Landres	Philip Rapp	March 26, 1954
26	26	"The Painting"	Paul Landres	George Oppenheimer	April 2, 1954
with Raymond Greenleaf as Dr. Remington / Tom Browne Henry as Mr. Simeon / Steve Darrell as Guard / Robert Pike as Curator
27	27	"Henrietta Sells the House"	Lew Landers	Philip Rapp	April 9, 1954
with Kathleen Freeman as Katie / Thurston Hall as Mr. Schuyler / Don Beddoe as Mr. Newby / Katherine Warren as Mrs. Newby / Anthony Sydes as Orville / Isa Ashdown as Arabelle
28	28	"Legacy"	Paul Landres	Robert Riley Crutcher	April 16, 1954
With Kathleen Freeman as Katie / Arthur Space as Mr. Jackson / Douglas Wood as Judge / James Parnell as Delivery Man
29	29	"Topper Goes to Las Vegas"	Lew Landers	Stanley Davis and Elon Packard	April 23, 1954
The episode opens with Topper coming down the stairs of his house, about to leave for work as he, Marion and George are clearly engaged in conversation, but the soundtrack only consists of descriptive narration [by uncredited Sandy Becker]: "This is Cosmo Topper, bank vice-president, loving husband and... no, he's not a magician – George and Marion Kerby are doing that – ghosts – yes, a handsome couple who were swallowed by an avalanche and came back to spread a little joy into a sedate businessman's life... and that's their ghost dog, Neil, the St. Bernard who couldn't save them – that's what you get for drinking on the job, old boy. Aren't they a wonderful bunch? And just think – Topper is the only person in the whole world who can see or hear them – except you and I, of course. Well, it's off to the bank for Topper. What a way to start the day". with Thurston Hall as Mr. Schuyler / Paul Bryar as Lafferty / Lee Roberts as Martin / G. Pat Collins as Olaf Larsen / Arthur Lovejoy as Clerk
30	30	"Topper Goes West"	Lew Landers	Philip Rapp	April 30, 1954
With Thurston Hall as Mr. Schuyler / Harry Shannon as Foreman / Frank Sully as Charley / William Cottrell as Van Horn / John Dierkes as Cowboy
31	31	"Sweepstakes"	Paul Landres	Robert Riley Crutcher	May 7, 1954
With Thurston Hall as Mr. Schuyler / Charles Lane as Mr. Kittler / Nana Bryant as Woman / Charles Williams as Harlon
32	32	"The Package"	Paul Landres	Joel Rapp	May 14, 1954
33	33	"Neil Disappears"	Unknown	Philip Rapp	May 21, 1954
34	34	"The Picnic"	Lew Landers	George Oppenheimer	May 28, 1954
35	35	"The Wedding"	Lew Landers	Robert Riley Crutcher	June 4, 1954
36	36	"Preparations for Europe"	James V. Kern	George Oppenheimer, Stephen Sondheim	June 11, 1954
The episode opens with Topper, about to leave for work, entering the living room to say goodbye to Henrietta, but the soundtrack only consists of descriptive narration [by uncredited Sandy Becker]: "Morning, Topper! Seen your two ghost friends yet? There they are, folks... George and Marion Kerby... you'd never believe it, but they were swallowed by an avalanche on their fifth wedding anniversary... That's Neil the alcoholic Saint Bernard... he went with them... Ain't love grand? You see, the Kerbys and Neil have come back to spread a little joy into Topper's rather sedate life... and he's the only one who can see or hear them... outside of you and I, naturally. Well, I... I guess Topper's off to the bank. Uh oh... that's a sure sign something's cooking... when a woman gets on the phone, there's no use talking... let's listen...
37	37	"The Boat"	Richard L. Bare	George Oppenheimer	June 18, 1954
38	38	"Theatricals"	Lew Landers	George Oppenheimer, Stephen Sondheim	June 25, 1954
39	39	"George's Old Flame"	Lew Landers	George Oppenheimer and Stephen Sondheim	July 2, 1954
with Kathleen Freeman as Katie / Mira McKinney as Mrs. Baskerville / Thurston Hall as Mr. Schuyler / Frances Rafferty as Ellen Bates / James Seay as Larry Hartford / uncredited (in order of appearance): Lillian Bronson as Miss Erskine / Renny McEvoy as Waiter / Roland Varno as Maitre'd

=== Season 2 (1954–55) ===
No. overall	No. in season	Title	Directed by	Written by	Original release date
40	1	"Topper Tells All"	Philip Rapp	George Oppenheimer, Philip Rapp	October 8, 1954
41	2	"Topper's Ransom"	Philip Rapp	Robert Riley Crutcher	October 15, 1954
42	3	"County Fair"	Philip Rapp	Philip Rapp	October 22, 1954
43	4	"The Seance"	Leslie Goodwins	Robert Thomsen	October 29, 1954
44	5	"Topper Strikes Gold"	Lew Landers	Philip Rapp	November 5, 1954
45	6	"The Chess Player"	Unknown	Sig Herzig	November 12, 1954
46	7	"Topper Goes to Washington"	Leslie Goodwins	Philip Rapp	November 19, 1954
47	8	"Jury Duty"	Unknown	Robert Riley Crutcher	November 26, 1954
48	9	"Topper Lives Again"	Leslie Goodwins	Robert Riley Crutcher	December 3, 1954
49	10	"The Army Game"	Unknown	Donn Mullally	December 10, 1954
50	11	"Topper's Accident"	Lew Landers	Robert Riley Crutcher	December 17, 1954
51	12	"Topper's Quiet Christmas"	Leslie Goodwins	Robert Riley Crutcher	December 24, 1954
52	13	"Topper's Happy New Year"	Lew Landers	Robert Riley Crutcher, Philip Rapp	December 31, 1954
53	14	"Topper's Deception"	Leslie Goodwins	Robert Riley Crutcher	January 7, 1955
54	15	"Topper's Guest"	Leslie Goodwins	Stanley Davis, Elon Packard	January 14, 1955
55	16	"Topper's Rejuvenation"	Lew Landers	Stanley Davis, Elon Packard	January 21, 1955
56	17	"Topper in Mexico"	Lew Landers	Robert Riley Crutcher	January 28, 1955
57	18	"Topper Hits the Road"	Leslie Goodwins	Stanley Davis, Elon Packard	February 4, 1955
58	19	"Topper at the Races"	Lew Landers	Norman Paul	February 11, 1955
59	20	"Topper's Racket"	Leslie Goodwins	Philip Rapp	February 18, 1955
60	21	"Topper's Amnesia"	Leslie Goodwins	Robert Riley Crutcher	February 25, 1955
61	22	"Topper's Arabian Night"	Leslie Goodwins	Robert Riley Crutcher	March 4, 1955
62	23	"The House Wreckers"	Leslie Goodwins	Philip Rapp	March 11, 1955
63	24	"Topper Makes a Movie"	Lew Landers	Philip Rapp	March 18, 1955
64	25	"King Cosmo the First"	Lew Landers	Philip Rapp	March 23, 1955
65	26	"Topper's Double Life"	Unknown	Philip Rapp	March 30, 1955
66	27	"Topper Fights a Duel"	Lew Landers	Philip Rapp	April 8, 1955
67	28	"Topper's Egyptian Deal"	Leslie Goodwins	Robert Riley Crutcher	April 15, 1955
68	29	"Topper's Uranium Pile"	Leslie Goodwins	Donn Mullally	April 22, 1955
69	30	"Topper's Spring Cleaning"	Leslie Goodwins	Robert Riley Crutcher	April 29, 1955
70	31	"Topper Goes to School"	Leslie Goodwins	Philip Rapp	May 6, 1955
71	32	"The Blood Brother"	Lew Landers	Stanley Davis, Elon Packard	May 13, 1955
72	33	"Topper's Highland Fling"	Leslie H. Martinson	Robert Riley Crutcher	May 20, 1955
73	34	"Topper's Desert Island"	Leslie Goodwins	Robert Riley Crutcher	May 27, 1955
74	35	"The Neighbors"	Leslie Goodwins	George Oppenheimer	June 3, 1955
75	36	"Topper's Counterfeiters"	Leslie H. Martinson	Robert Riley Crutcher	June 10, 1955
76	37	"Topper's Insurance Scandal"	Lew Landers	Sig Herzig	June 17, 1955
77	38	"Topper's Other Job"	Lew Landers	Philip Rapp	June 24, 1955
78	39	"Topper's Vacation"	Lew Landers	Robert Riley Crutcher	July 15, 1955

== Broadcast and syndication ==
Topper was popular in syndication for more than a decade. Camel commercials and their references were removed but the characters could still be seen smoking them.

== Home media ==
There are 11 episodes in the public domain which have been released on DVD but the series has not been given a full release.

== See also ==
- The Adventures of Topper
- Topper (film)
- Topper Takes a Trip
- Topper Returns
- List of ghost films
