= USS Lardner (DD-487) =

Gleaves-class destroyer

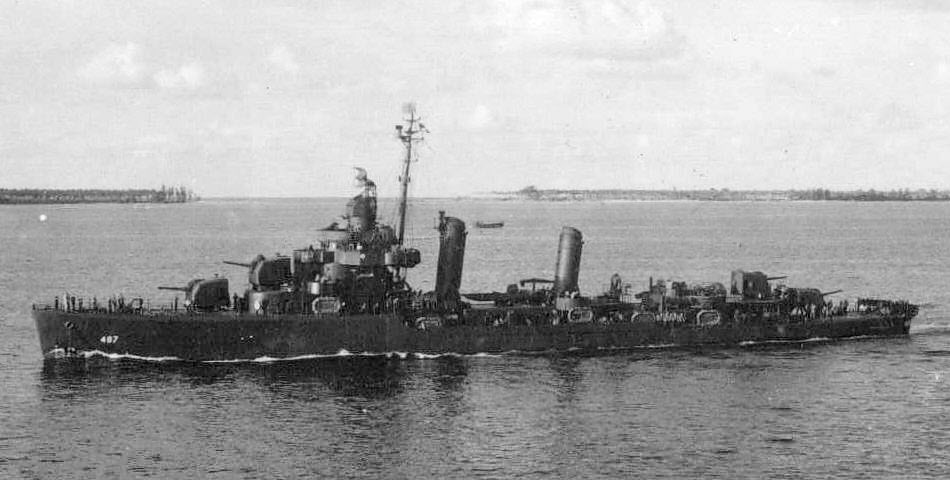
- USS Lardner

History

United States
- Name: Lardner
- Namesake: James Lawrence Lardner
- Builder: Federal Shipbuilding and Drydock Company
- Laid down: 15 September 1941
- Launched: 20 March 1942
- Commissioned: 13 May 1942
- Decommissioned: 16 May 1946
- Fate: To Turkey 10 June 1949
- Stricken: 15 August 1949

Turkey
- Name: Gemlik
- Acquired: 10 June 1949
- Stricken: 1974
- Fate: Sunk as a target 21 November 1982

General characteristics
- Class & type: Gleaves-class destroyer
- Displacement: 1,630 tons
- Length: 348 ft 3 in (106.15 m)
- Beam: 36 ft 1 in (11.00 m)
- Draft: 11 ft 10 in (3.61 m)
- Propulsion: 50,000 shp (37,000 kW); 4 boilers; 2 propellers
- Speed: 37.4 knots (69 km/h)
- Range: 6,500 nmi (12,000 km; 7,500 mi) at 12 kn (22 km/h; 14 mph)
- Complement: 16 officers, 260 enlisted
- Armament: 5 × 5 in (127 mm) DP guns, 6 × 0.50 in (12.7 mm) guns, 6 × 20 mm AA guns, 10 × 21 in (533 mm) torpedo tubes, 2 × depth charge tracks

USS Lardner (DD-487), a Gleaves-class destroyer, was the second United States Navy ship to be named for Rear Admiral James L. Lardner, a Naval officer during the American Civil War. Lardner received 10 battle stars for World War II service.

The ship was laid down on 15 September 1941 by Federal Shipbuilding and Drydock Company, Kearny, New Jersey, was launched on 20 March 1942 (sponsored by Mrs. Sidney F. Tyler II, Lardner's great-granddaughter), and was commissioned 13 May 1942.

== Service history ==
The Lardner's shakedown cruise off the New England coast began 28 May and lasted until 1 July 1942. During this period, she investigated several reports of submarines near the coast of Maine and searched for a reported U-boat off Guantánamo Bay, Cuba.

=== South Pacific service ===
On 21 August 1942, Lardner departed Balboa for the South Pacific, arriving in Tongatapu on 3 September. There the ship acted as escort and screen for convoys and fleet units, making numerous passages to Nouméa and Espiritu Santo, and screening transports landing troops on Guadalcanal, where she bombarded enemy positions.

While Lardner was serving in the screen for Task Force 18 steaming from the Santa Cruz Islands to Espiritu Santo, aircraft carrier Wasp was torpedoed and sunk 15 September. Lardner immediately launched a depth charge attack while her boats picked up 322 survivors, debarking them at Espiritu Santo the next day.

On 17 and 30 October Lardner headed for Guadalcanal, arriving off Lunga Point at dawn, and splashed two enemy planes during attacks shortly thereafter. She then proceeded to her bombardment position and shelled Japanese positions from Kolumbona to Cape Esperance.

Lardner screened transports while they unloaded at Guadalcanal during November, and at dawn 28 November searched in vain for the enemy submarine which had torpedoed Alchiba. On 30 November Lardner, as part of TF 7's five cruisers and seven destroyers, engaged the enemy off Tassafaronga Point in the Battle of Tassafaronga. At the end of the contest, the Japanese withdrew, never again to send large naval forces into the area. After escorting damaged cruisers Honolulu and Pensacola to Espiritu Santo, the destroyer arrived at Nouméa, New Caledonia, 10 December and moored for overhaul alongside destroyer tender Dixie.

During the first part of January 1943, the destroyer screened battleships and convoys between Espiritu Santo, Purvis Bay, and Guadalcanal. She visited New Zealand on 15 February and upon return sailed from Nouméa with a group of transports and tankers for Guadalcanal, fighting off attacking enemy planes 17 February and anchoring next day with her charges unscathed. The remainder of the month, Lardner escorted various convoys between Guadalcanal and Nouméa. During March she escorted convoys between Guadalcanal and Fiji, New Hebrides, and Espiritu Santo, and in April joined Task Force 15. Lardner returned to Pearl Harbor on 8 May for installation of new equipment.

Lardner operated in Hawaiian waters until sailing 14 July for the United States, escorting the aircraft carrier Enterprise to Bremerton, Washington. She arrived San Francisco on 21 July, and sailed on 27 July for Samoa, touching at Pearl Harbor 1 August and arriving Pago Pago on 14 August. While there, Lardner operated with TF 37, returning to Espiritu Santo 2 September before patrol duty off Florida Island until 18 September, when she escorted amphibious craft and transports to Vella Lavella for landings.

After patrol duty early in October, Lardner returned to escort duty between New Caledonia and the Solomons, then screened task forces operating out of Purvis Bay in the Bougainville Campaign. She bombarded Bougainville on 29 November, and continued occasional bombardments along with escort missions through January 1944. On 14 February, Lardner sailed north with TF 38 to cover initial landings on Green Island, and on the way was attacked by six Aichi D3A "Val" dive bombers. Late in February, the destroyer bombarded Rabaul; searched the Bismarck Sea for enemy shipping; and then attacked Karavia Bay, sinking an enemy cargo ship of the ''Heito Maru'' class 25 February. Later that day she bombarded Kavieng, receiving a few shrapnel holes from extremely heavy and accurate enemy return fire. During March and April, Lardner operated with support forces for the Palaus raid, and with escort carriers during the landing at Hollandia, New Guinea.

=== Central Pacific service ===
In June and July 1944, Lardner participated in the occupation of Guam, Saipan, and Tinian; escorted carriers on the first Bonin Islands raid; and joined in the Battle of the Philippine Sea.

Lardner returned to the United States for overhaul at Bremerton, and headed back toward the South Pacific 29 September. She spent most of the month of October in Hawaiian waters. From 19 November until March 1945, the destroyer escorted convoys between Ulithi, Eniwetok, Kossol Passage, and Leyte. While on antisubmarine and air guard patrol off Peleliu and Angaur, she rescued five downed air corps flyers on 27 December. While investigating an unidentified small craft, Lardner ran aground on a submerged shoal on 9 January 1945 and proceeded to Ulithi for repairs.

On 23 February she got underway escorting a convoy to Kossol Roads and took up patrol station between Pelelieu and Angaur. Throughout March and April, Lardner remained in the vicinity on patrolling duty with occasional visits to Kossol for refueling and replenishment. Throughout May and June, the destroyer operated with a support force of escort carriers containing the chain of Japanese island bases from Okinawa to Formosa while Okinawa was being secured. During July and August the ship was continuously at sea operating off the east coast of Japan supplying direct logistic support to U.S. 3rd Fleet ships during their sustained attacks on the Japanese homeland.

=== Post-war service ===
With the end of hostilities and Japan's unconditional surrender, Lardner escorted the crippled Borie to Saipan 17 August 1945, and from Saipan sailed to Okinawa to join a group of battleships preparing to sail to Japan for the Japanese surrender. Lardner arrived Sagami Wan on 27 August and entered Tokyo Bay on 29 August, escorting Fleet Admiral Chester Nimitz's flagship South Dakota. Lardner next joined in evacuating several hundred prisoners-of-war from southern Honshū. Lardner operated with several task groups and units performing varied occupation duties until 15 October when she departed Honshu with TG 50.5 for home. On the homeward voyage, she touched at Singapore, Ceylon, Cape Town, and Saldanha Bay, South Africa, before arriving New York on 7 December 1945.

The veteran destroyer remained at New York City until 9 February 1946, then sailed to Charleston, South Carolina. Lardner decommissioned 16 May 1946 and joined the Atlantic Reserve Fleet until transferred to Turkey 10 June 1949 under the Military Assistance Program. She served the Turkish Navy as TCG Gemlik (D 347) until 1974.

On 21 November 1982, the ship was sunk as a target in the Eastern Mediterranean by the cruiser Biddle, frigates Julius A. Furer, Truett, and aircraft from CVW-6.
