= USS Lardner (DD-286) =

Clemson-class destroyer

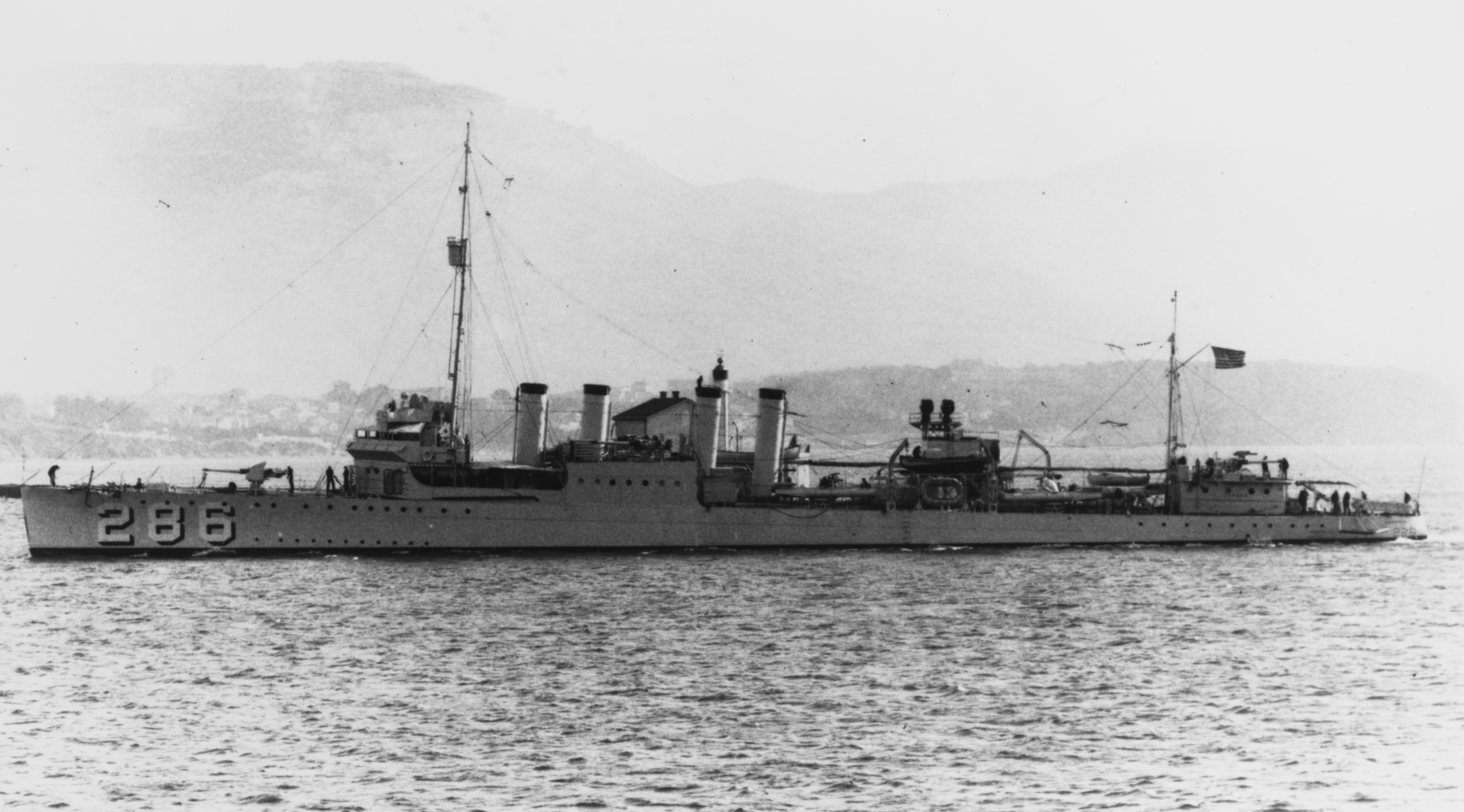

History

United States
- Namesake: James L. Lardner
- Builder: Bethlehem Shipbuilding Corporation, Squantum Victory Yard
- Laid down: 16 June 1919
- Launched: 29 September 1919
- Commissioned: 10 December 1919
- Decommissioned: 1 May 1930
- Stricken: 22 October 1930
- Fate: Sold for scrapping, 17 January 1931

General characteristics
- Class & type: Clemson-class destroyer
- Displacement: 1,190 tons
- Length: 314 feet 6 inches (95.86 m)
- Beam: 31 feet 8 inches (9.65 m)
- Draft: 9 feet 3 inches (2.82 m)
- Propulsion: 26,500 shp (20 MW); geared turbines, 2 screws
- Speed: 35 knots (65 km/h)
- Range: 4,900 nmi (9,100 km); @ 15 kt
- Complement: 120 officers and enlisted
- Armament: 4 × 4 in (102 mm)/50 guns, 2 × 3 in (76 mm)/25 guns, 4 × 21 inch (533 mm) torpedo tubes

The first USS Lardner (DD-286) was a Clemson-class destroyer in service with the United States Navy from 1919 to 1930. She was scrapped in 1931.

== History ==
Lardner was named for James L. Lardner. She was launched by the Bethlehem Shipbuilding Corporation, Squantum, Massachusetts, 29 September 1919; sponsored by Miss Margaret Large, granddaughter of Rear Admiral Lardner; and commissioned 10 December 1919.

Assigned to Destroyer Force, Atlantic Fleet, Lardner departed Newport, Rhode Island, for Cuba where she participated in tactical exercises, battle practice. and fleet maneuvers. She returned to Boston, Massachusetts 15 May 1920 and operated with destroyer squadrons patrolling off the Florida coast. On 28 August she joined the reserve fleet at Charleston, South Carolina to train Naval Reservists until departing for Jacksonville, Florida, in April 1921.

Lardner operated along the Atlantic coast through 1921 and 1922. In January 1923, she departed Boston and joined the Scouting Fleet off Cuba and in February joined the Pacific Fleet off Panama. Lardner departed for the United States arriving Norfolk, Virginia 24 April 1923 for refit, and then rejoined the Scouting Fleet off the New England coast until the winter when she sailed for the Caribbean, returning to the United States in the spring of 1924. She patrolled along the Atlantic coast until September 1925, and then departed New York for Guantanamo and Haiti returning to Charleston, 28 April 1926.

Lardner joined Destroyer Division 27 on 17 June 1926, visiting several ports in northern Europe. September found Lardner off Gibraltar and in the Mediterranean, visiting various ports. Lardner departed for the United States towing Scorpion, arriving at Philadelphia 12 July 1927. Between August 1927 and September 1929, Lardner continued operations along the Atlantic coast with annual winter cruises to the Caribbean, often training Naval Reservists.

== Fate ==
Lardner decommissioned at Philadelphia 1 May 1930, in accordance with the London Naval Treaty, and was struck from the Navy Register 22 October 1930. She was sold for scrapping to the Boston Iron & Metal Company, Baltimore, Maryland, 17 January 1931.
