= Donald Elder =

American editor and writer

Donald Elder (1913–1956) was an American author and editor. He edited Doubleday, Doran and Co. and was also the author of Ring Lardner, A Biography, which details the life of the great humorist from Niles, Michigan.
