= The Baby Snooks Show =

American radio program

David Stone Martin's illustration of Fanny Brice in the role of Baby Snooks

The Baby Snooks Show is a old-time American radio program starring comedian and Ziegfeld Follies alumna Fanny Brice as a mischievous young girl who was 40 years younger than the actress who played her when she first went on the air. Several earlier radio series had already offered sketches featuring the Snooks character as one of the segments in their show, but this series was the first to be devoted entirely to her character. The series began on CBS September 17, 1944, airing on Sunday evenings at 6:30 pm as Post Toasties Time (for sponsor General Foods). The title soon changed to The Baby Snooks Show, and the series was sometimes called Baby Snooks and Daddy.

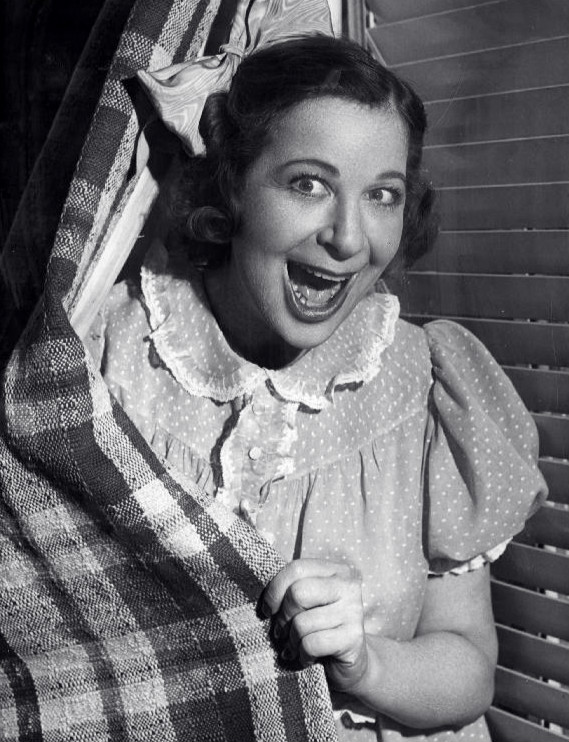
Fanny Brice as Baby Snooks

== History of character ==
In 1904, George McManus began his comic strip, The Newlyweds, about a couple and their child, Baby Snookums. Brice began doing her Baby Snooks character in vaudeville, as she recalled in an interview shortly before her death: "I first did Snooks in 1912 when I was in vaudeville. At the time there was a juvenile actress named Baby Peggy and she was very popular. Her hair was all curled and bleached and she was always in pink or blue. She looked like a strawberry ice cream soda. When I started to do Baby Snooks, I really was a baby, because when I think about Baby Snooks it's really the way I was when I was a kid. On stage, I made Snooks a caricature of Baby Peggy."

Early on, Brice's character was sometimes called "Babykins." By 1934 she was wearing her baby costume while appearing on Broadway in the Follies show. On February 29, 1936, Brice was scheduled to appear on radio's Ziegfeld Follies of the Air, written and directed by Philip Rapp. Rapp and his writing partner David Freedman searched the closest bookcase, opened a public domain collection of sketches by Robert Jones Burdette, Chimes From a Jester’s Bells (1897), and adapted a humorous piece about a kid and his uncle, changing the boy to a girl named Snooks. Rapp continued to write the radio sketches when Brice played Snooks on the Good News shows the following years. In 1940, she became a regular character on Maxwell House Coffee Time in one of the two segments that divided the show. The other segment featured actor Frank Morgan, who sometimes did a crossover into the Snooks sketches.

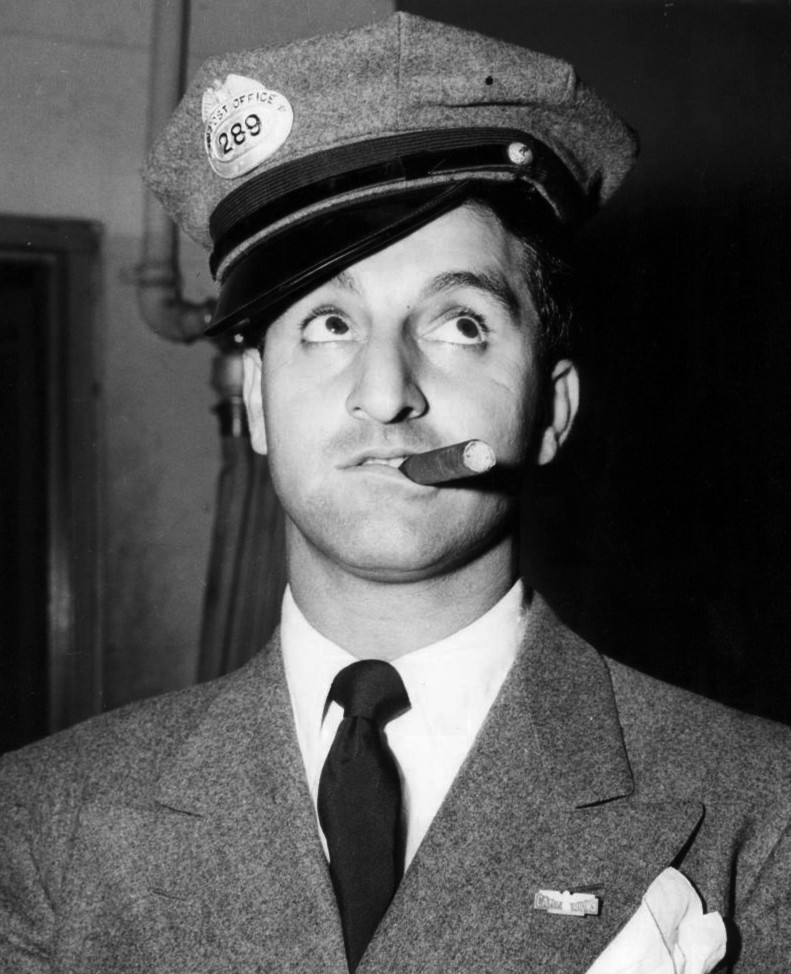
Danny Thomas as Jerry Dingle, 1945.

On screen, Brice portrayed Baby Snooks in the 1938 film Everybody Sing in a scene with Judy Garland as Little Lord Fauntleroy.

== The Baby Snooks Show ==
Beginning on September 17, 1944, the character was given her own show, and during the 1940s it became one of the nation's favorite radio situation comedies, with a variety of sponsors (Post Cereals, Sanka, and Jell-O) being touted over the years by a series of a half-dozen announcers—John Conte, Tobe Reed, Harlow Wilcox, Dick Joy, Don Wilson and Ken Roberts.

Hanley Stafford became well known for his portrayal of Snooks's long-suffering, often-cranky father, Lancelot “Daddy” Higgins, a role played earlier by Alan Reed on the 1936 Follies broadcasts. Lalive Brownell was Vera “Mommy” Higgins, later portrayed by Lois Corbet (mid-1940s) and Arlene Harris (after 1945). Beginning in 1945, the child impersonator Leone Ledoux was first heard as Snooks's younger brother Robespierre, and Snooks returned full circle to the comics when comic book illustrator Graham Ingels and his wife Gertrude named their son Robespierre (born 1946) after listening to Ledoux's child voice.

Danny Thomas was the "daydreaming postman" Jerry Dingle (1944–45), who imagined himself in other occupations, such as a circus owner or railroad conductor. Others in the cast included Ben Alexander, Elvia Allman, Sara Berner, Charlie Cantor, Ken Christy, Earl Lee, Frank Nelson, Lillian Randolph, Alan Reed (as Mr. Weemish, Daddy's boss) and Irene Tedrow.

Script writers included Bill Danch, Sid Dorfman, Robert Fisher, Everett Freeman, Arthur Stander and Jess Oppenheimer (later the producer and head writer of I Love Lucy). Philip Rapp often revised his scripts three times before airing. The show was produced and directed by Mann Holiner (early 1940s), Al Kaye (1944), Ted Bliss, Walter Bunker and Arthur Stander. Clark Casey and David Light handled the sound effects, with music by Meredith Willson (1937–44) and Carmen Dragon. Bob Graham was the vocalist in 1945.

Baby Snooks recording

In 1945, when illness caused Brice to miss several episodes, her absence was incorporated into the show as a plot device in which top stars (including Robert Benchley, Sydney Greenstreet, Kay Kyser and Peter Lorre) took part in a prolonged search for Snooks. In the fall of 1946, the show moved to Friday nights at 8:00 pm, continuing on CBS until May 28, 1948. On November 8, 1949, the series moved to NBC where it was heard Tuesdays at 8:30 pm. Sponsored by Tums, The Baby Snooks Show continued on NBC until May 22, 1951. Two days later, Fanny Brice had a cerebral hemorrhage, and the show ended with her death at age 59. A memorial broadcast aired on May 29, 1951.

One of the last shows in the series, "Report Card Blues" (May 1, 1951), is included in the CD set, The 60 Greatest Old-time Radio Shows of the 20th Century (1999), introduced by Walter Cronkite.

== Baby Snooks depiction ==
Radio historian Arthur Frank Wertheim recalls a few of the character's pranks: "…planting a bees' nest at her mother's club meeting, cutting her father's fishing line into little pieces, ripping the fur off her mother's coat, inserting marbles into her father's piano and smearing glue on her baby brother." Yet Snooks was not a mean-spirited child: "The character may have seemed a noisy one-joke idea based on Snooks driving Daddy to a screaming fit," wrote Gerald Nachman in Raised on Radio. "Yet Brice was wonderfully adept at giving voice to her irritating moppet without making Snooks obnoxious." Nachman quoted Variety critic Hobe Morrison: "Snooks was not nasty or mean, spiteful or sadistic. She was at heart a nice kid. Similarly, Daddy was harried and desperate and occasionally was driven to spanking his impish daughter. But Daddy wasn't ill-tempered or unkind with the kid. He wasn't a crab."

Brice herself was so meticulous and fanatical about the character that, according to Nachman, "she dressed in a baby-doll dress for the studio audience," and she also appeared in the costume at parades and personal appearances. She also insisted on her script being printed in extremely large type so she could avoid having to use reading glasses when on the air live. She was self-conscious about wearing glasses in front of an audience and didn't believe they fit the Snooks image. By her own admission, Brice was a lackadaisical rehearser: "I can't do a show until it's on the air, kid," she was quoted as telling her writer/producer Everett Freeman. Yet she locked in tight according to Freeman ("she was Baby Snooks") when the show did go on—right down to Snooks-like "squirming, squinting, mugging, jumping up and down," as comedian George Burns remembered.

== Other appearances ==
=== Radio ===
Snooks proved so universally appealing that Brice and Stafford were invited to perform in character on the second installment of The Big Show, NBC's big-budget, last-ditch bid to keep classic radio variety programming alive amidst the television onslaught. Snooks tapped on hostess Tallulah Bankhead's door to ask about a career in acting, despite Daddy's telling her she already didn't have what it took. Later in the show, Snooks and Daddy appeared with fellow guest star Groucho Marx in a spoof of Marx's popular quiz-and-comedy show, You Bet Your Life.

=== Television ===
Brice and Stafford brought Baby Snooks and Daddy to television only once, an appearance on the June 12, 1950, edition of CBS-TV's Popsicle Parade of Stars. This was Fanny Brice's only appearance on television, with Baby Snooks portrayed by the adult Brice in a little girl's outfit. Brice later admitted that the character of Baby Snooks just didn't work properly when seen.

== Death ==
Fanny Brice died May 29, 1951, with her memoirs unfinished and with Baby Snooks due on the air that same night. The May 29 memorial broadcast, a musical tribute to Brice, ended with a short eulogy from Stafford: "We have lost a very real, a very warm, a very wonderful woman."

== Books containing show scripts ==
Philip Rapp's The Baby Snooks Scripts, edited by Ben Ohmart (BearManor Media, 2003), contains Rapp's original radio scripts from Maxwell House Coffee Time, the Good News Show and other programs.

The Baby Snooks Scripts, volume two (BearManor Media, 2007), includes an undated script by Rapp featuring Alfred Hitchcock in the unlikely role of Snooks.

== Episodes ==
=== 1937 ===
- 12/30/37 Daniel in the Lion's Den

=== 1938 ===
- 02/17/38 Telling Time And Shaving
- 03/10/38 Income Tax
- 03/24/38 Rehearsing A Speech
- 03/31/38 At the Circus
- 04/14/38 Why? Because! (With Judy Garland)
- 05/05/38 Vitamins & Hiccups
- 05/19/38 Beach House
- 06/09/38 At the Doctors
- 09/01/38 A Tisket A Tasket
- 09/22/38 Aunt Sophie Having a Baby
- 10/20/38 Daddy Has An Hour to Kill
- 12/22/38 Visiting Santa Claus

=== 1939 ===
- 01/??/39 The Man Who Came to Dinner
- 01/22/39 Daddy's an Elk
- 01/29/39 Daddy's Boss Comes to Dinner
- 04/04/39 House Breaking
- 05/05/39 Life Insurance
- 05/11/39 Barking Rabbit
- 05/18/39 Golf Tea
- 05/25/39 Hugh What?
- 06/01/39 Gone Fishing
- 06/08/39 Violet Ray
- 06/15/39 Living by Dyeing
- 06/22/39 New Baby
- 06/29/39 Jealousy
- 09/07/39 Pulling Teeth
- 09/14/39 At the Dentist
- 09/22/39 Heat Wave
- 09/28/39 Airport Meeting
- 10/05/39 Mudneck
- 10/26/39 Cake Writing & Abe Lincoln
- 11/05/39 Barking Rabbit
- 11/16/39 Rich Uncle & Slapsie Maxie
- 11/23/39 Court Case
- 11/30/39 Insurance Exam
- 12/14/39 Psychoanalyzed
- 12/21/39 Sneaky Snooks
- 12/28/39 Hunting

=== 1940 ===
- 01/04/40 Bungling Burglars
- 01/11/40 Male Secretary
- 01/18/40 Chemical Catastrophe
- 01/25/40 Shetland Pony
- 02/01/40 Family Tree
- 02/08/40 Anatomy of a Robot
- 02/15/40 Tax Returns
- 02/22/40 The Missing Dollar
- 02/29/40 Wedding Cake
- 03/07/40 Baby Snooks Has Amnesia
- 03/14/40 Tom Thumb
- 03/21/40 Laying an Egg
- 03/28/40 Baby Brother (Wants Attention)
- 04/04/40 April Fools
- 04/11/40 Baby Fish Story
- 04/18/40 Magic
- 04/25/40 Motel
- 05/02/40 Auntie Septic
- 05/09/40 Lies
- 05/16/40 Jokes for Jack
- 06/22/40 Tonsils Operation
- 07/11/40 At the Beach
- 07/18/40 Library Visit
- 07/25/40 Port Hole Safe
- 09/05/40 Magazine Scam
- 09/12/40 New Car
- 09/19/40 Playing Hooky
- 09/26/40 Where's the Medicine?
- 10/10/40 Football Game
- 10/17/40 Where's My Change?
- 10/24/40 Raising a Loan
- 10/31/40 Ruined Suit
- 11/07/40 Oil Discovered
- 11/14/40 Measles
- 11/21/40 4 Fathers
- 11/28/40 Stolen Turkey
- 12/12/40 Haunted House
- 12/19/40 Christmas Skates
- 12/26/40 Returning Presents

=== 1941 ===
- 01/02/41 Sneaking Out
- 01/09/41 Art Museum
- 01/23/41 Flat Tire
- 01/30/41 Jury Duty
- 02/06/41 Flower Gardens
- 02/13/41 Taxes Again
- 02/27/41 At the Races
- 03/20/41 Photographer
- 03/27/41 Buying Shoes
- 04/03/41 At the Zoo
- 04/10/41 Trout Fishing
- 04/17/41 Baseball Game
- 04/24/41 Fixing Supper
- 05/08/41 Riding Academy
- 05/22/41 Insomnia
- 05/29/41 Antique Auction
- 06/05/41 Calisthenics
- 06/12/41 X-Ray Machine
- 06/19/41 Dollar Day
- 06/26/41 Artist Daddy
- 07/10/41 Going to Camp
- 10/02/41 Snooks Returns
- 10/09/41 New School
- 10/23/41 Duck Hunting
- 10/31/41 Halloween
- 11/06/41 Defense Stamps
- 11/13/41 Mixed Nuts
- 11/27/41 The Opera
- 12/18/41 Air Raid Warden

=== 1942 ===
- 01/01/42 Hangover
- 01/08/42 Victory Garden
- 01/15/42 House Guest
- 01/22/42 Hiccups
- 01/29/42 Report Card
- 02/05/42 Knitting Lessons
- 02/12/42 Camping In
- 02/26/42 Stealing Chickens
- 03/19/42 Fake Measles
- 03/26/42 Red Cross
- 04/02/42 Easter Suit
- 04/09/42 Daddy's Birthday
- 04/16/42 Poultice
- 04/23/42 $50.00 Raise
- 04/30/42 Quiz Kids
- 05/07/42 Fishing Rod
- 05/14/42 Driving Home From a Wedding
- 05/21/42 Sugar
- 05/28/42 Abnormal Psychology
- 06/04/42 10th Anniversary
- 06/11/42 The Twins
- 06/18/42 The Trade
- 07/02/42 Baby Buggy
- 09/03/42 Camp Report
- 09/24/42 Matinee
- 10/01/42 Gozinta
- 10/08/42 Charlie
- 12/03/42 Getting Gas
- 12/18/42 Cinderella

=== 1943 ===
- 01/14/43 Stolen Medal
- 11/04/43 The Trial

=== 1944 ===
- 06/15/44 The World's Most Patient Father
- 12/03/44 Daddy Tries to Cure Snooks Lying

=== 1945 ===
- 05/13/45 Live from the Bijou
- 09/16/45 Snooks is Missing
- 12/16/45 Baby Snooks is Lost

=== 1946 ===
- 11/01/46 Hallowe'en Trick or Treat

=== 1947 ===
- 03/02/47 Home Remodeling
- 05/23/47 Miracle Children Quiz Show
- 10/17/47 Daddy's New Suits
- 10/24/47 Ugly Duckling (Snooks is Unpopular)
- 10/24/47 Charles Harding Blaire to arrive

=== 1950 ===
- 11/12/50 Snooks & Tallulah

=== 1951 ===
- 01/05/51 Daddy's Old Flame
- 01/15/51 The Lady Detective
- 02/18/51 Hanging Wallpaper
- 03/20/51 The Easter Bonnet
- 05/05/51 Report Card Blues

== Bibliography ==
- Dunning, John. On the Air: The Encyclopedia of Old-Time Radio. New York: Oxford University Press, 1998. ISBN 0-19-507678-8
- Harmon, Jim. The Great Radio Comedians. Albany, Georgia: BearManor Media, 2007. ISBN 978-1-59393-111-7
- Rapp, Philip. The Baby Snooks Scripts. Albany, Georgia: BearManor Media, 2006. ISBN 1-59393-057-7
- Rapp, Philip. The Baby Snooks Scripts Vol. 2. Albany, Georgia: BearManor Media, 2007. ISBN 978-1-59393-094-3
- Sies, Luther F. Encyclopedia of American Radio 1920–1960. Jefferson, North Carolina: McFarland, 2000. ISBN 0-7864-0452-3
- Terrace, Vincent. The Radio's Golden Years: Encyclopedia of Radio Programs, 1930–1960. A. S. Barnes, 1981. ISBN 0-498-02393-1
