= Holiday Song =

1952 teleplay by Paddy Chayefsky

- The Philco Television Playhouse episode
- Episode no.: Season 4 Episode 25
- Directed by: Gordon Duff
- Written by: Paddy Chayefsky
- Based on: "It Happened on a Brooklyn Subway"
- Original air date: September 14, 1952

Guest appearances
- Joseph Buloff - Cantor Sternberger; Herbert Berghof - Zucker; Frances Chaney - Naomi; Irja Jensen - Marya; Werner Klemperer - Leopold; Dora Weissman - Mrs. Davis; David Opatoshu - George; David Kermer - Rabbi

Episode chronology
← Previous "The Last Hour"	Next → "The Thin Air"

"Holiday Song" was broadcast in September 1952 as the final episode of season four of the anthology series, The Philco Television Playhouse. It was the first hour-long TV show written by Paddy Chayefsky, and helped establish his reputation as an outstanding dramatist in the so-called Golden Age of Television. The popular episode was brought back for an encore presentation a year later.

== Background ==
As an initial writing assignment for Philco Playhouse, Chayefsky was asked to adapt a Paul Deutschman article, "It Happened on a Brooklyn Subway", published in May 1949 in Reader's Digest. The article described Marcel Sternberger, a staid middle-aged portrait photographer and Hungarian immigrant, who every morning rode the same train from his Long Island home to his Manhattan office. One morning he decided on an impulse to change trains and visit a friend in Brooklyn who had been ill. The Brooklyn train was packed, but just as Sternberger entered, a man jumped up and exited, and Sternberger took his place. Here is how Chayefsky summarized what happened next:

Seated next to him was a young man reading a Hungarian newspaper. Being Hungarian himself, the photographer struck up a conversation. The young fellow told a harrowing tale of having been in Nazi concentration camps. There was something familiar in the story to the photographer. A few months before, he had met a Hungarian girl who had told him of very much the same sort of experience. On a hunch, the photographer called the girl, who turned out to be the young fellow's long-lost wife. The author of the article drew the conclusion that God had been riding the Brooklyn subway that day.

In an essay on his adaptation process, Chayefsky wrote that while the Reader's Digest article possessed the element of surprise, it needed more drama and character development. He speculated, "What sort of man would construe this chance meeting on a subway as a machination of God?" It would have to be a character who in the beginning did not believe in God. The story also required a sense of urgency: "Why is it so urgent that the photographer regain his faith in God? What terrible consequence will occur if he doesn't?" Chayefsky admitted that with his Jewish background, he had always wanted to base a story on synagogue life. And so he converted Sternberger into a cantor who is having a crisis of faith on the eve of the High Holy Days.

== Synopsis ==
The story begins with a depressed Cantor Leon Sternberger moping at home. His unmarried niece Naomi, who lives with him, is worried and invites his friend Zucker to try to find out what's wrong. Sternberger tells Zucker he is doubting the existence of God, and cannot in good conscience perform his ceremonial singing duties for the next night's Rosh Hashanah service. Zucker persuades Sternberger to consult that day with the learned Rabbi Marcus in Manhattan who will offer sage advice and guidance. Sternberger reluctantly agrees. He seldom travels outside his neighborhood and is baffled by the New York subway system. He asks directions to the Manhattan train, and erroneously gets sent to the Brooklyn train, where he saves a suicidal young Dutch woman, Marya, from jumping to her death. He walks her home to her boarding house and learns she is from Utrecht; she is an Auschwitz survivor, alone in New York City, and believes her husband was killed in the Holocaust.

In an Act II subplot, a family friend, Mrs. Davis, plays matchmaker and introduces her brother George (a prosperous businessman visiting from Cleveland) to Naomi. George soon proposes to Naomi and she accepts. Meanwhile, Sternberger returns to his neighborhood; he and Zucker call on the local rabbi, explaining how Sternberger's crisis of faith jeopardizes the next night's service. The rabbi urges the cantor to immediately see Rabbi Marcus in Manhattan and pose the question, "Which deserves first consideration—the social obligations of the cantor's position or the religious requirements?" Again, Sternberger is sent to the Brooklyn train by mistake. He strikes up a conversation with a young Dutchman, Leopold, from Utrecht who tells a sad tale of losing his wife in Auschwitz. When Sternberger hears that Leopold's wife was named Marya, he telephones the boarding house and asks to speak to her. He puts Leopold on the phone, and the young couple are ecstatic to rediscover one another. Sternberger becomes convinced that a divine intervention and miracle have occurred. The episode ends with him in his prayer shawl in the synagogue, happily singing to the congregation.

== Aftermath ==
"Holiday Song" was critically acclaimed and led to Chayefsky receiving many more writing assignments from Philco Playhouse. However, he insisted that from then on, he would only create original dramas and no longer do adaptations.

In a departure from usual practice, the show's producer Fred Coe brought back "Holiday Song" for a second presentation the following season, in an episode directed by Delbert Mann. The cast members from the September 1952 broadcast were asked to reprise their roles, except for Frances Chaney who had since been blacklisted. The Naomi part went to Anne Hegira.

The "Holiday Song" teleplay was one of six that Chayefsky selected for inclusion in a 1955 anthology of his television work.
