= Rebecca Lardner =

English artist

Rebecca Lardner (born 1971, in Swanage) is an English artist. Her parents were a gamekeeper and a postmistress.

Lardner gained a BA (Hons) degree in Graphic Design specialising in illustration from Liverpool John Moores University. Her work is strongly influenced by scenes and subjects found along the Dorset coast. Since graduation has worked as a professional artist and illustrator. In 1995 she designed, made and installed 24 animated windows for the prestigious Brown Thomas in Dublin for the Christmas lights in 1995.

In 1998 she travelled to Southern India to paint a mural for the Russ Foundation before travelling to continue her painting. Her work has been publicised worldwide through her illustrations and publications and her limited edition prints reach outlets throughout Europe and America. She regularly exhibits with leading galleries in the UK and her delightful naive paintings are bought by collectors worldwide.
