= Haircut (short story) =

American short story by Ring Lardner

- Short story by Ring Lardner
- Country: United States
- Language: English
- Genre: Black comedy

Publication
- Publication type: Print
- Publication date: 1925

"Haircut" is a short story by American writer Ring Lardner, first published in 1925. It is told from the perspective of a loquacious barber (solely in monologue; the barber is the only speaker) as he recounts the story of a recently-deceased town prankster named Jim Kendall.

The story is a bleak satire on warped small-town morality and considered Lardner’s most famous work outside of sports writing.

== Plot summary ==
Whitey, a local barber, reminisces fondly to an unnamed customer (who is not from the town) about Jim; as the monologue progresses, the stories Whitey relays to the customer about Jim's behavior become increasingly disturbing. Despite such, Whitey presents Jim's behavior as being comical, calling him "a caution" or "a character".

Jim, a local resident and regular customer, would frequent the barbershop and engage in repartee with others there, although all of his remarks are insults. It is also revealed that Jim has an estranged relationship with his wife and family, as he is an unemployed alcoholic. He originally held a job as a traveling canned goods salesman, taking note of various names and addresses he encountered. Afterwards, he would send strangers anonymous postcards with messages such as, "Ask your Missus who kept her from gettin' lonesome the last time you were in Carterville".

One day, Jim tricks his wife and children into attending the town fair while he abandons them to go drink. Doc Stair, a handsome young doctor and the local coroner, finds the family and offers to buy tickets for them himself. Stair is gregarious and is close friends with Paul Dickson, a mentally disabled child who is a frequent target of Jim's pranks, and an educated young woman named Julie Gregg. Upon discovering the incident at the fair, Jim proclaims he is deeply attracted to Julie and openly flirts with her. She dislikes him for his jokes, so he instead attempts to rape her; she narrowly escapes, and he is merely given a warning by the local police. Jim and several of his friends later torment Julie; he boasts about doing so in the barbershop. Paul overhears the story and relays it to Stair, who later mentions in passing that Jim "ought not to be let live".

Later, Jim plans to go duck-hunting but has no one to accompany him. Paul asks Jim if he can go; Jim reluctantly agrees. The next day, Stair comes into Whitey's barbershop and asks about Paul; when he learns about Paul going duck-hunting with Jim he is concerned. Doc's concerns are valid; later that day he is summoned to the scene of a fatality: Jim has been shot dead with his own gun by Paul. Paul tells Stair that the shooting was an accident, as he had never shot a firearm before; without an autopsy or a coroner's jury, Stair rules Jim's death to be accidental.

Whitey finally declares that Jim "certainly was a card", before asking the customer if he wants his hair combed wet or dry.

== Analysis ==
Like much of Lardner’s writing, the story is a biting commentary on the everyday codes of American culture. Some analysts have cited "Haircut" as satirizing the complicity of small-town life and the lack of moral consciousness on the part of its characters.

Editor Max Perkins wrote that, after reading the story, he couldn’t "shake it out of my mind; in fact the impression it made has deepened with time." Literary critic Elizabeth Hardwick referred to it in her retrospective on Lardner, Ring, as "one of the cruelest pieces of American fiction."
