= David Lardner =

American journalist (1919–1944)

- Born: David Ellis Lardner; March 11, 1919 Niles, Michigan, United States
- Died: October 19, 1944 (aged 25) Aachen, Germany
- Resting place: Henri-Chapelle American Cemetery and Memorial: Belgium
- Occupation: Editor, movie critic, war correspondent
- Spouse: Frances Chaney (m. 1941; div. 1944)
- Children: 2
- Parents: Ring Lardner, Ellis Abbott
- Relatives: James, John, Ring Jr. (brothers)

David Ellis Lardner (March 11, 1919 – October 19, 1944) was an American editor, a movie critic, and later a war correspondent for The New Yorker magazine. He was the fourth son of humorist Ring Lardner. He was killed when a land mine exploded under the jeep he was riding in while covering the European Theatre of World War II. He had been in Europe for four months.

== Background ==
David Lardner, the youngest of four sons born to noted writer and humorist Ring Lardner and his wife, Ellis Abbott, remained unnamed for two months after his birth, and his father ran a contest for naming suggestions, none of which were used.

David Lardner became an anonymous reporter and interviewer for "The Talk of the Town" column in The New Yorker in 1939 at the age of 20, as well as a movie reviewer. Shortly after he married his wife Frances, he was given responsibility for another department, "Notes on Sports". His two children, Kate and Joe, were born while he was writing this column. The "Notes on Sports" column continued intermittently for more than two years but was discontinued permanently when David left to cover World War II in London. He asked for an overseas assignment after being rejected for military service due to poor eyesight.

== Death ==
Lardner and Russell Hill, correspondent for the New York Herald Tribune, were riding in a jeep from the combat-devastated city of Aachen to a press camp on October 19, 1944. Lardner had only joined the First Army press corps a few days before, on his first war assignment.

Hill suggested that they take a short-cut. The road chosen had just been swept for mines by engineers but the mines had been left stacked by the road for retrieval the following day, and the vehicle swerved into a pile of them. "One report said the jeep touched off a string of seven antivehicular mines."

Lardner was blown from the jeep and knocked unconscious. He died a few hours later in a hospital. Hill was also injured, and the driver was killed. Lardner was 25.
