= John Lardner (sportswriter) =

American writer (1912–1960)

- Born: May 4, 1912; Chicago, Illinois, U.S.
- Died: March 24, 1960 (aged 47); New York City, U.S.
- Education: Phillips Academy, Harvard University, Sorbonne
- Occupations: Sports writer, freelance writer, WWII war correspondent, author
- Spouse: Hazel Cannan Hairston
- Children: 4
- Parent(s): Ring Lardner, Ellis Abbott
- Relatives: James, Ring Jr., David (brothers)

John A. Lardner (May 4, 1912 – March 24, 1960) was an American sports writer, WWII war correspondent, and author. He was the son of Ring Lardner.

== Career ==
Lardner attended Phillips Academy, graduating in 1929. After one year at Harvard, he left for the Sorbonne in Paris for a year, where he wrote for the International Herald Tribune. Never finishing his college degree, he elected instead to work for the New York Herald Tribune from 1931 onward, following in his father's path as a sports writer. Lardner wrote a weekly column for Newsweek called "Sport Week" until his death (he had been associated with the magazine since 1939). From 1933 to 1948, he was a sports columnist and war correspondent for the North American Newspaper Alliance.

He later became a war correspondent during World War II, dispatching from Europe and Africa. He also deployed with the first American troops to Australia in 1942, and wrote the book Southwest Passage, published in 1943, documenting that experience. In addition, he wrote for the Saturday Evening Post, The New Yorker, The New York Times Magazine, and Woman's Home Companion. Lardner also worked with his brother Ring Lardner Jr. on film projects and helped support his brother's family when Lardner Jr. was blacklisted by the Hollywood movie studios during the Red Scare of the late 1940s and 1950s. He served on the Peabody Awards Board of Jurors from 1959 to 1960. Lardner died of a heart attack in March 1960, after years of fighting tuberculosis.

Subsequently his friend, the author Roger Kahn, gathered many of his pieces into a book, The World of John Lardner. Another friend, cartoonist Walt Kelly, designed the jacket and wrote a preface. Some of Lardner's work was collected into a 2010 book, The John Lardner Reader: A Press Box Legend's Classic Sportswriting, by sports writer John Schulian. Lardner's papers are located at the Newberry Library in Chicago.

== Personal life ==
Lardner, the first son of Ring Lardner and his wife Ellis, was born in Chicago, where his father was writing for the Chicago Examiner. The family moved to the East Coast when he was seven, eventually settling on Long Island, where their friends and neighbors included Grantland Rice, Franklin Pierce Adams, and F. Scott Fitzgerald. He was married to Hazel Cannen Hairston and had four children.
