= Ring Lardner Jr. =

American screenwriter (1915–2000)

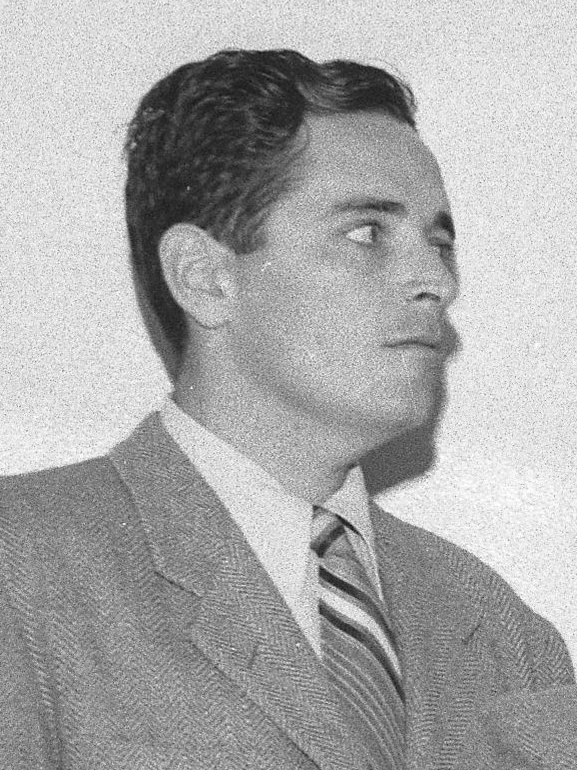
- Lardner in 1947
- Born: Ringgold Wilmer Lardner Jr. August 1915; Chicago, Illinois, U.S.
- Died: October 31, 2000 (aged 85); New York City, U.S.
- Occupations: Screenwriter, novelist
- Years active: 1937–1977
- Spouses: Silvia Schulman (m. 1937; div. 1945); Frances Chaney (m. 1946)
- Children: 3
- Parent(s): Ring Lardner, Ellis Abbott
- Relatives: James, John, David (brothers)

Ringgold Wilmer Lardner Jr. (August 15 or 19, 1915 – October 31, 2000) was an American screenwriter and novelist. After enjoying early success in Hollywood, he was subpoenaed in 1947 by the House Un-American Activities Committee (HUAC), where he refused to answer whether he was a member of the Communist Party. He was declared in contempt of Congress, blacklisted by the film studios as one of the "Hollywood Ten", and sentenced to a year in federal prison. Lardner's next screenplay credit, using his own name, was not until The Cincinnati Kid in 1965. He went on to win an Academy Award for his M*A*S*H (1970) screenplay.

== Early life ==
Born in Chicago, he was the son of Ellis (Abbott) and the nationally known journalist, humorist and short story writer Ring Lardner. Ring Jr. and his three brothers—James, John, and David—grew up in material and cultural privilege. He was educated at Phillips Academy in Andover, Massachusetts. He attended Princeton University for two years but then dropped out ("I didn't see the point of finishing") in June 1934.

By that time, Lardner had begun what he called his "leftward migration", which he attributed to "the growing severity of the Depression and what I assessed as the failure of both major parties to come to grips with it". In autumn of 1934, he enrolled at the Anglo-American Institute of the University of Moscow, an experience that moved his ideology further toward communism. In 1936 he was recruited by his friend Budd Schulberg to join the US Communist Party (CPUSA), and voted that year for Communist candidate Earl Browder in the presidential election.

== Writing career ==
After his return to New York from Moscow in 1935, Lardner was hired as a cub reporter for the Daily Mirror. In less than a year, he was lured away from his $25-a-week job to earn $40-a-week in the publicity department of David O. Selznick's Hollywood film studio, Selznick International Pictures. While Lardner was laboring in obscurity as a junior publicist, a writing opportunity arose. Selznick was soliciting ideas from anyone in the studio for a suitable ending to the film, A Star Is Born. Lardner and Schulberg huddled together and submitted a closing scene in which Vicki Lester (Janet Gaynor)—still grieving from the suicide of her husband—proudly introduces herself to a throng of admirers as "Mrs. Norman Maine". The line was enthusiastically accepted by Selznick, and would be reused in subsequent remakes of A Star Is Born. Although the film's co-writer Dorothy Parker was unable to persuade Selznick to grant Lardner and Schulberg a screen credit for their work, Lardner began to get more writing assignments. He soon made another uncredited contribution to an ending, this time with George Oppenheimer for the 1937 screwball comedy, Nothing Sacred.

In 1938, Lardner joined the "B movie" unit at Warner Bros. and gained additional screenplay experience. He collaborated with British writer Ian McLellan Hunter on two small features for RKO, Meet Dr. Christian (1939) and The Courageous Dr. Christian (1940). Lardner's big break came when he and Michael Kanin wrote Woman of the Year (1942), a film which won the Best Original Screenplay Academy Award. That success vaulted Lardner's weekly salary from $250 to $1000. Among his next assignments, he made uncredited improvements to Laura (1944) (he was asked by director Otto Preminger to sharpen the dialogue of Clifton Webb's character, Waldo Lydecker), and co-wrote the films Cloak and Dagger (1946) and Forever Amber (1947). He also worked on an animated short film, Brotherhood of Man (1946), that promoted racial tolerance.

During these years in Hollywood, Lardner continued his left-wing activism. He helped raise funds for the Republican cause in the Spanish Civil War. He was involved in organizing anti-fascist demonstrations. The death of his brother James—who volunteered for the Abraham Lincoln Battalion and was killed in action in Spain in 1938—was said to have deepened Lardner's leftist loyalties. He meanwhile was part of the Hollywood section of the CPUSA and attended Marxist meetings as often as 4-5 nights a week. He joined groups such as the Hollywood Anti-Nazi League and the Hollywood Writers Mobilization Against the War. He also served on the board of the Screen Writers Guild. Despite his radical politics, Lardner remained a well-compensated employee in the film industry. In 1947 he became one of the highest paid screenwriters when he signed a contract with 20th Century Fox at $2,000 a week (equivalent to $29,198 a week in 2025).

=== Blacklisting ===
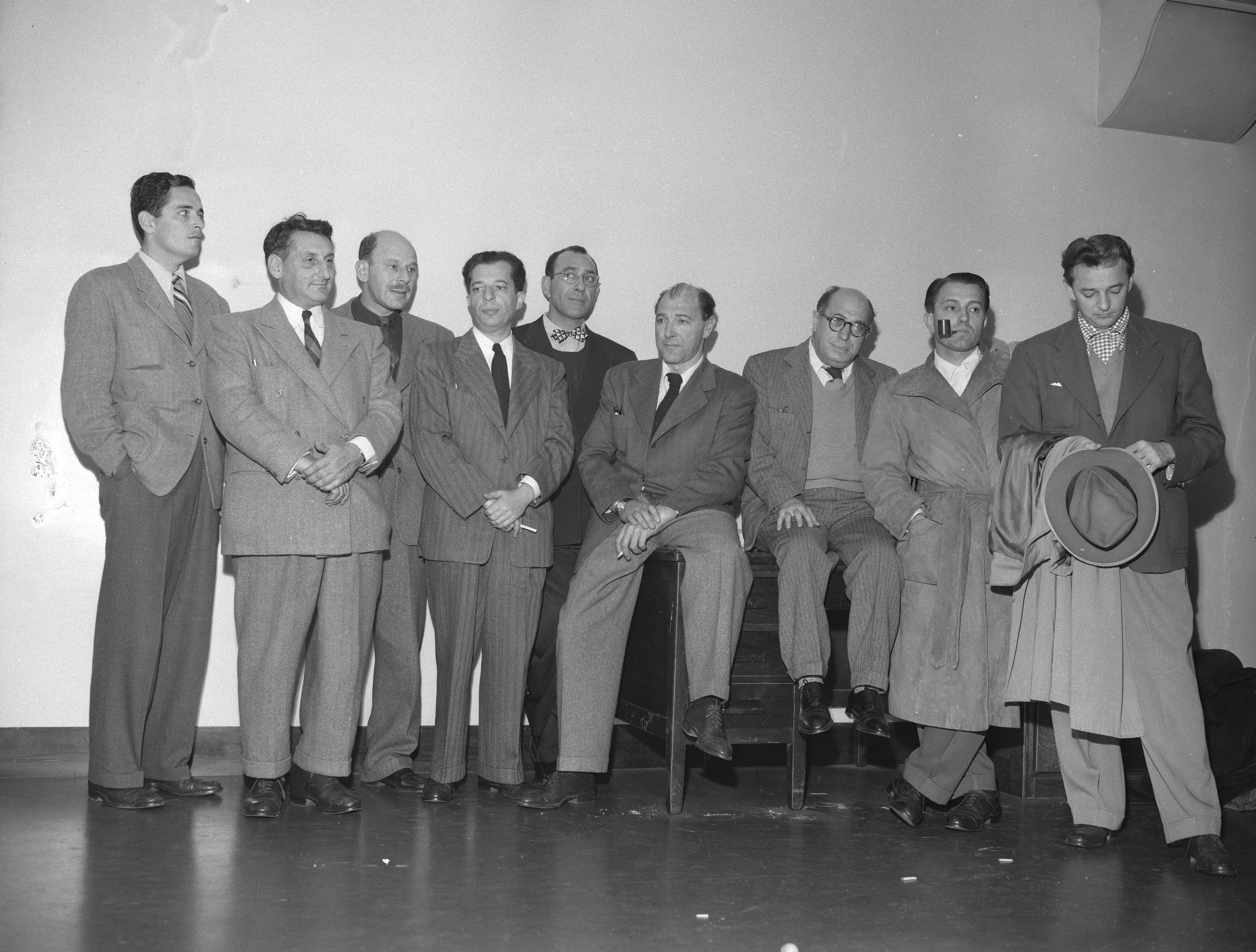
Nine of the Hollywood Ten, charged with contempt of Congress, after surrendering to the U.S. Marshal, December 10, 1947. (L-R): Ring Lardner Jr., John Howard Lawson, Alvah Bessie, Albert Maltz, Herbert Biberman, Lester Cole, Samuel Ornitz, Edward Dmytryk, Robert Adrian Scott.

After the Second World War, the House Un-American Activities Committee (HUAC) launched hearings to investigate "communist influences in the motion picture industry", and the injection of subversive propaganda into films. In September 1947, HUAC subpoenaed over 40 producers, directors, writers, and actors. More than half were deemed "friendly witnesses" who agreed to cooperate with the committee. Nineteen were labeled "unfriendly" because they opposed the committee's right to conduct the inquiry. Eleven of the nineteen (ten Americans plus the German-born Bertolt Brecht) were compelled to testify in October 1947.

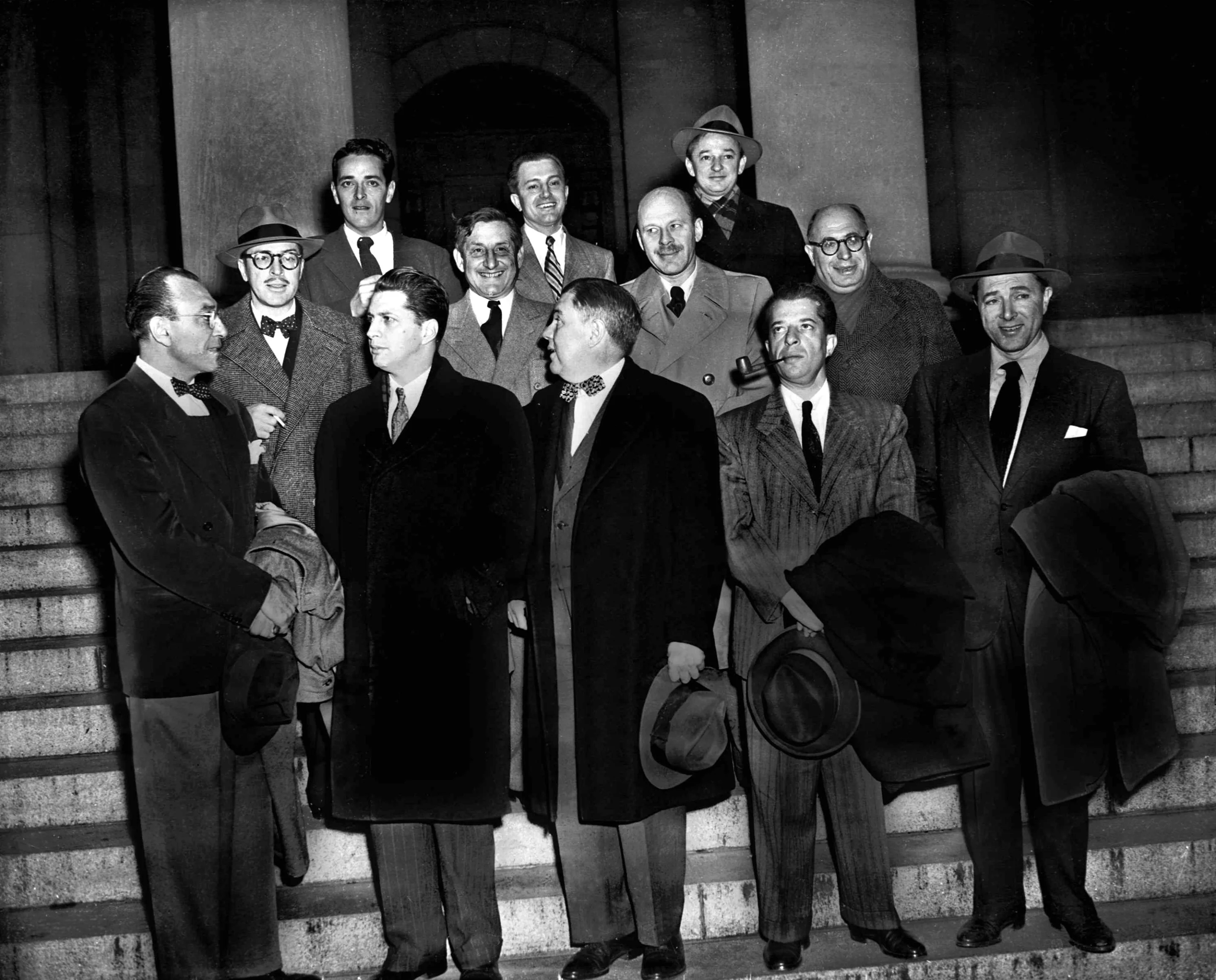
"The Hollywood Ten" stand with their attorneys outside district court in Washington, D.C. before arraignment on contempt of Congress charges. The ten were charged for refusing to cooperate with the House Un-American Activities Committee. (Front row, L-R): Herbert Biberman, attorney Martin Popper, attorney Robert W. Kenny, Albert Maltz and Lester Cole. (Second row, L-R): Dalton Trumbo, John Howard Lawson, Alvah Bessie and Samuel Ornitz. (Top row, L-R): Ring Lardner Jr., Edward Dmytryk and Adrian Scott.

Unlike most of his colleagues, Lardner was not given a set date for his testimony, but was told to wait until further notice. He was in a Washington, D.C. hotel room on October 29, listening to the HUAC proceedings on the radio, when Committee Chairman J. Parnell Thomas suddenly called Lardner to take the stand. His attorney Robert Kenny promised to produce his client the next morning. As Lardner recalled in a 1997 interview:

I prepared a written statement, which I asked permission to read. Thomas said I could read it after my testimony, not before. When I was asked if I belonged to the Writers Guild and began to explain why that was an improper question, he broke in and said he would skip "to the sixty-four dollar question" [i.e., whether Lardner was a CPUSA member]. To that one I responded, "I could answer the question the way you want, Mr. Chairman, but I'd hate myself in the morning." That increased his rage, and he ordered me removed from the stand. I tried to remind him he had promised I could read my statement, but he just kept shouting for me to be taken away.

A month after his testimony, Lardner was fired by 20th Century Fox. He was branded—along with Alvah Bessie, Herbert Biberman, Albert Maltz, Adrian Scott, Dalton Trumbo, Lester Cole, Edward Dmytryk, Samuel Ornitz and John Howard Lawson—one of the "Hollywood Ten" who refused to answer questions about their political affiliations. The ten men claimed that under the First Amendment's right of free speech, their political beliefs and affiliations were their own private affair. HUAC and the courts disagreed. All ten were found guilty of contempt of Congress, fined $1,000, and sentenced to between 6–12 months in federal prison. After their appeal to the U.S. Supreme Court was dismissed in May 1950, Lardner began serving what would be a nine-and-a-half-month stint at the Federal Correctional Institution in Danbury, Connecticut. His fellow inmates included Lester Cole and, ironically, J. Parnell Thomas who had been convicted of fraud.

Upon release from prison, Lardner was blacklisted by the film studios. He and his family fled Hollywood, initially to Mexico and then to New York. He worked on a novel, The Ecstasy of Owen Muir, published in England in 1954. Starting in 1955, he and another blacklistee, his former RKO writing partner Ian McLellan Hunter, used pseudonyms (Lardner's was Oliver Skene) to write episodes for three British TV series: The Adventures of Robin Hood, The Adventures of Sir Lancelot, and The Buccaneers. The series were produced by Hannah Weinstein, an American expatriate living in England. For several years, the script meetings with Weinstein in England could only be attended by Hunter, who had managed to obtain a passport despite his political activities. Travel abroad for Lardner was deemed "not in the best interests of the United States" and was denied by the Passport Bureau. The restriction lasted from 1951 to 1958, when the U.S. Supreme Court ruled that passports could not be denied for political reasons. During this period, Lardner's other writing jobs, such as his script contributions to Virgin Island (1958) and A Breath of Scandal (1960), were always done using "fronts" or pseudonyms, and for "greatly reduced money".

=== Post-blacklist ===
The blacklist was lifted for Lardner when producer Martin Ransohoff and director Norman Jewison gave him a screenplay credit for The Cincinnati Kid (1965). In 1968 he was sent a copy of Richard Hooker's comic novel about the Korean War, MASH: A Novel About Three Army Doctors. Lardner's adaptation was made into the Robert Altman-directed film M*A*S*H (1970), for which Lardner won an Academy Award for Best Screenplay Based on Material from Another Medium, presented in April 1971. In his acceptance speech, he alluded to his prior win for Woman of the Year:

At long last a pattern has been established in my life. At the end of every twenty-eight years I get one of these. So, I will see you all again in 1999.

In 1976 he published a memoir, The Lardners, about his family. In his last credited film project, he rewrote a script, originally created by Bill Gunn, for the 1977 Muhammad Ali biopic, The Greatest. Lardner published a second novel, All for Love, in 1985. In the 1990s, he adapted Roger Kahn's book The Boys of Summer, but the film was never produced.

According to Hungarian writer Miklós Vámos—who visited Lardner several times before his death—Lardner said he had also won an Academy Award for a movie he wrote behind a “front”, but that he would not divulge details about the screenwriter who received the award because the person had previously done Lardner a great favor.

== Personal life ==
In 1937, Lardner married Silvia Schulman, David O. Selznick's secretary. They had a son and daughter before divorcing in 1945. The screenwriter then married actress Frances Chaney in 1946, and they remained wed until his death in 2000. They had one son. Chaney was formerly married to Lardner's younger brother David, a World War II foreign correspondent who was killed in Germany in 1944.

Ring Lardner Jr. died from cancer at his home in Manhattan, on the evening of October 31, 2000, at the age of 85. He was the last surviving member of the Hollywood Ten.

== Works ==
- The Ecstasy of Owen Muir. London: Jonathan Cape. 1954. LCCN 56001470.
- The Lardners: My Family Remembered. New York: Harper & Row. 1976. ISBN 0060125179.
- All for Love. New York: Franklin Watts. 1985. ISBN 0531097773.
- I'd Hate Myself in the Morning: A Memoir. New York: Thunder's Mouth Press. 2000. ISBN 1560252960.

== See also ==
- The Hollywood Ten documentary.
