= Ring Lardner =

American writer (1885–1933)

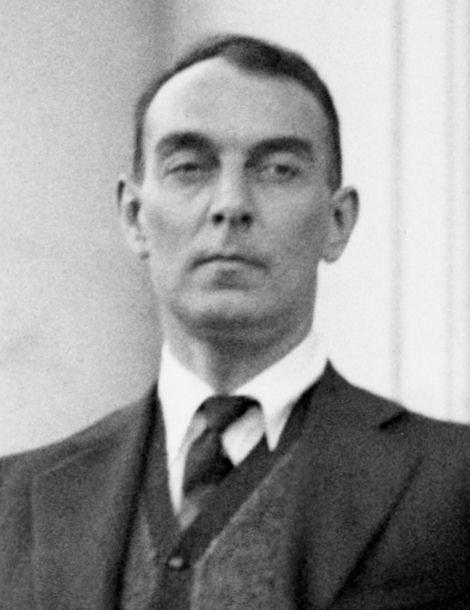
- Lardner in 1921
- Born: Ringgold Wilmer Lardner; March 6, 1885; Niles, Michigan, U.S.
- Died: September 25, 1933 (aged 48); East Hampton, New York, U.S.
- Occupations: Writer, journalist
- Spouse: Ellis Abbot
- Children: James, John, Ring Jr., David
- Parent(s): Henry Lardner, Lena Phillips Lardner
- Relatives: James L. Lardner (uncle)

Ringgold Wilmer Lardner (March 6, 1885 – September 25, 1933) was an American sports columnist and short story writer best known for his satirical writings on sports, marriage, and the theatre. Notable contemporaries such as Ernest Hemingway, Virginia Woolf, and F. Scott Fitzgerald expressed strong admiration for his work, and author John O'Hara credited Lardner with shaping his understanding of dialogue.

== Early life ==
Ring Lardner was born in Niles, Michigan, the son of wealthy parents, Henry and Lena Phillips Lardner. He was the youngest of nine children. Lardner's name came from a cousin of the same name. The cousin had been named by Lardner's uncle, Rear Admiral James L. Lardner, who had decided to name his son after a friend, Rear Admiral Cadwalader Ringgold, who was from a distinguished military family. Lardner never liked his given name and abbreviated it to Ring for all personal and professional purposes, although he named one of his sons Ringgold Jr (who also abbreviated it to Ring).

In childhood he wore a brace for his deformed foot until he was eleven. He had a passion for baseball, the stage, and music. He later attended the Armour Institute in Chicago.

== Career ==
=== Syndicated writing ===
Lardner started his writing career as a sports columnist, finding work with the newspaper South Bend Times in 1905. In 1907, he relocated to Chicago, where he got a job with the Inter-Ocean. Within a year, he quit to work for the Chicago Examiner, and then for the Tribune. Two years later, Lardner was in St. Louis, writing the humorous baseball column Pullman Pastimes for Taylor Spink and The Sporting News. Some of this work was the basis for his book You Know Me Al. Within three months, he was an employee of the Boston American.

In 1913, Lardner returned to the Chicago Tribune, which became the home newspaper for his syndicated column In the Wake of the News (started by Hugh Keough, who had died in 1912). The column appeared in more than 100 newspapers, and is still published in the Tribune. Lardner's Tribune and syndicated writing was not exclusively sports-related: his dispatches from/near the World War One front were collected in the book My Four Weeks in France, and his immersive coverage of the 1920 Democratic Convention resulted in Lardner receiving 0.5 votes on the 23rd ballot.

=== Books and stories ===
In 1916, Lardner published his first successful book, You Know Me Al, an epistolary novel written in the form of letters by "Jack Keefe", a bush-league baseball player, to a friend back home. The letters made much use of the fictional author's idiosyncratic vernacular. It had initially been published as six separate but interrelated short stories in The Saturday Evening Post, causing some to classify the book as a collection of stories, others as a novel. Like most of Lardner's stories, You Know Me Al employs satire.

Journalist Andrew Ferguson wrote that "Ring Lardner thought of himself as primarily a sports columnist whose stuff wasn't destined to last, and he held to that absurd belief even after his first masterpiece, You Know Me Al, was published in 1916 and earned the awed appreciation of Virginia Woolf, among other very serious, unfunny people." Ferguson termed the book one of the top five pieces of American humor writing.

Sarah Bembrey has written about a singular event in Lardner's sportswriting experience: "In 1919 something happened that changed his way of reporting about sports and changed his love for baseball. This was the Black Sox scandal when the Chicago White Sox sold out the World Series to the Cincinnati Reds. Ring was exceptionally close to the White Sox and felt he was betrayed by the team. After the scandal, Ring always wrote about sports as if there were some kink to the outcome." Lardner's last fictional baseball writing was collected in the book Lose with a Smile (1933).

Lardner later published such stories as "Haircut", "Some Like Them Cold", "The Golden Honeymoon", "Alibi Ike", and "A Day with Conrad Green". He also continued to write follow-up stories to You Know Me Al, with the protagonist of that book, the headstrong, egotistical but gullible Jack Keefe, experiencing various ups and downs in his major league career and in his personal life. Private Keefe's World War I training camp letters home to his friend Al were collected in the book Treat 'Em Rough: Letters From Jack the Kaiser Killer. The sequel, The Real Dope, followed Keefe overseas to the trenches in France. He then returned home to pitch for the 1919 Chicago White Sox, but the sequence of stories closed with Keefe being traded to the Philadelphia A's before the 1919 World Series—Jack Keefe, whatever his flaws, would not be involved in the Black Sox scandal. Lardner returned to the character when he wrote the continuity for a daily You Know Me Al comic strip that ran from 1922 to 1925.

=== Theatre and music ===
Lardner also had a lifelong fascination with the theatre, although his only Broadway three-act successes were the thrice-filmed Elmer, the Great, co-written with George M. Cohan, and June Moon, a comedy authored with Broadway veteran George S. Kaufman. Lardner also wrote skits for the Ziegfeld Follies and a series of brief nonsense plays that ridiculed the conventions of the theatre, using zany humor and outrageous, impossible stage directions, such as "The curtain is lowered for seven days to denote the lapse of a week."

He was a dedicated composer and lyricist: both his first (Zanzibar (1903)) and last (June Moon (1929)) published stage works included several Lardner tunes. He wrote at least one recorded song for Bert Williams, co-wrote one for Nora Bayes, and provided the lyrics for the song "That Old Quartet" (1913) by Nathaniel D. Mann. Other collaborators of note included Aubrey Stauffer, Jerome Kern on Very Good Eddie (1915), and Vincent Youmans—with whom he toiled on the Ziegfeld–Marilyn Miller–Fred and Adele Astaire musical Smiles (1930).

== Legacy ==
Lardner's books were published by Maxwell Perkins, who also edited Lardner's most important contemporaries, including Fitzgerald who, unlike Hemingway, also became Lardner's friend. Although Lardner held his own short stories in low regard—he did not save copies and had to get them from the magazines that had first published them to compile a book—Lardner influenced several of his more famous peers:

- In some respects, Lardner was the model for the tragic character Abe North in Fitzgerald's last completed novel, Tender Is the Night.
- Lardner also influenced Ernest Hemingway, who sometimes wrote articles for his high school newspaper using the pseudonym Ring Lardner Jr.
- Lardner's gift for dialogue heavily influenced the writer John O'Hara, who said he learned from reading Lardner "that if you wrote down speech as it is spoken truly, you produce true characters, and the opposite is also true: if your characters don't talk like people they aren't good characters" and added, "[I]t's the attribute most lacking in American writers and almost totally lacking in the British."

== Cultural references ==
- J. D. Salinger referred to Lardner in two of his works, The Catcher in the Rye and Franny and Zooey. In the former work, protagonist Holden Caulfield says: "My favorite author is my brother D.B. and my next favorite is Ring Lardner".
- Wayne C. Booth mentioned Lardner's famous short story "Haircut" in his essay "Telling and Showing."
- In his movie Eight Men Out (1988) about the Black Sox scandal, writer-director John Sayles portrayed Lardner as one of the clear-eyed observers who was not taken in by the conspiracy. In one scene, Lardner strolls through the White Sox train, singing a parody of the song "I'm Forever Blowing Bubbles," changed to "I'm Forever Throwing Ballgames."
- The Chicago Literary Hall of Fame inducted Lardner in 2016.
- Harry Turtledove describes his short story "Batboy" as a Ring Lardner pastiche.
- Neil Simon references Ring Lardner in his play Brighton Beach Memoirs.
- In John DeChancie's novel Castle for Rent, Lord Incarnadine mentions having been friends with Ring Lardner.
- In Sam Halpert's semi-autobiographical novel about a navigator in the 91st Bomb Group, A Real Good War (1997), the narrator mentions reading Lardner, and specifically refers to "Haircut".

== Personal life ==
Lardner married Ellis Abbott of Goshen, Indiana, in 1911. They had four sons who each became writers. John Lardner, born in 1912, was a newspaperman, sports columnist, and magazine writer. Ring's second born, James Lardner, worked as a newspaperman before he was killed in the Spanish Civil War fighting with the International Brigades. In 1939, James was remembered with the book Somebody Had to Do Something. A Memorial to James Phillips Lardner, a book that printed 500-copies. It was financed by the James Lardner Memorial Fund and featured contributions by Ernest Hemingway, Ring Lardner Jr., Jay Allen, Don Jesus Hernandez, El Campesino, Dolores Ibarruri, Vincent Sheean and drawings by Castelao. Ring Lardner's third son, Ring Lardner Jr., was an Academy Award-winning screenwriter who was blacklisted after the Second World War as one of the Hollywood Ten, screenwriters who were incarcerated for contempt of Congress after refusing to answer questions posed by the House Un-American Activities Committee (HUAC). His book, The Lardners, My Family Remembered (ISBN 0-06-012517-9), is a source of information on his father. The youngest, David Lardner, worked for The New Yorker as a general reporter and war correspondent before he was killed by a landmine near Aachen, Germany on October 19, 1944, less than one month after his arrival in Europe.

Lardner died on September 25, 1933, at the age of 48 in East Hampton, New York, of a heart attack due to complications from tuberculosis.

Lardner's grand-nephew is George Lardner Jr., a journalist at The Washington Post from 1963 and a 1993 Pulitzer Prize winner.

== Works ==
=== Plays ===
- Lardner, Ring W. (April 2001). Topping, Scott A. (ed.). An Annotated Edition of Short Plays. Kalamazoo, Michigan: Western Michigan University. "A Dissertation Submitted to the Faculty o f The Graduate College in partial fulfillment of the requirements for the Degree o f Doctor of Philosophy Department of English"
- Zanzibar: A Comic Opera in Two Acts (1903) (With Harry Schmidt)
- In Allah's Garden (1913) words by Ring Lardner, music by Aubrey Stauffer
- March 6th, 1914. The Home-Coming of Chas. A Comiskey, John J. McGraw, and James J. Callahan (1914) (With Edward G. Heeman)

=== Books ===
- Bib Ballads. P. F. Volland. 2008 [1915]. ISBN 978-0-598-74455-5. (Illustrated by Fontaine Fox)
- You Know Me Al: A Busher's Letters. George H. Doran Company. 2016 [1916]. ISBN 978-1-5369-8910-6.
- Gullible's Travels, Etc. Indianapolis: Bobbs-Merrill Company. 2011 [1917]. (Illustrated by May Wilson Preston)
- Treat 'em Rough: Letters from Jack the Kaiser Killer. Bobbs-Merrill Company. 2005 [1918]. ISBN 978-0-598-77984-7.
- My Four Weeks in France. 2018 [1918]. (Illustrated by Wallace Morgan)
- The Real Dope. Bobbs-Merrill Company. 1919. (Illustrated by May Wilson Preston; M. L. Blumenthal)
- Regular Fellows I Have Met. B.A. Wilmot. 2012 [1919]. ISBN 978-0-598-73898-1.
- Own Your Own Home. Bobbs-Merrill Company. ISBN 978-0-598-76316-7. (Illustrated by Fontaine Fox)
- The Young Immigrunts. Bobbs-Merrill Company. 2007 [1920]. ISBN 978-0-598-49796-3. (Illustrated by Gaar Williams)
- Symptoms of Being 35. Bobbs-Merrill Company. 1921. (Illustrated by Helen E. Jacoby)
- The Big Town: How I and the Mrs. Go to New York to See Life and Get Katie a Husband. Bobbs-Merrill Company. 2008 [1921]. ISBN 978-1-78000-760-1.(basis of 1948 Henry Morgan film So This Is New York)
- Say It With Oil / Say It With Bricks: A Few Remarks about Wives. George H. Doran Company. 2007 [1923]. ISBN 978-0-598-49737-6. (With Nina Wilcox Putnam)
- How to Write Short Stories – With Samples. Charles Scribner's Sons. 2007 [1924]. ISBN 978-0-403-01063-9. (Includes Champion – adapted as the 1949 film)
- What of It?. Charles Scribner's Sons. 1925.
- Charles Scribner's Sons Present Ring W Lardner In The Golden Honeymoon And Haircut (1926)
- The Love Nest: And Other Stories. Charles Scribner's Sons. 1926.
- The Story of a Wonder Man: Being the Autobiography of Ring Lardner. Charles Scribner's Sons. 2013 [1927]. ISBN 978-0-598-59109-8. (Illustrated by Margaret Freeman)
- Round Up: The Stories of Ring W. Lardner (1929)
- Stop Me – If You’ve Heard This One (1929)
- June Moon (1929) (With George S. Kaufman)
- First and Last. Charles Scribner's Sons. 2013 [1934]. ISBN 978-0-598-58940-8. (With Gilbert Seldes Preface)
- The Best Short Stories of Ring Lardner. Charles Scribner's Sons. 1985 [1957]. ISBN 0-684-18363-3. The front cover photograph of Ring Lardner at a typewriter is annotated "The work of a stupendous genius... only good for another century or so." —Jimmy Breslin
- The Best Short Stories of Ring Lardner. Chatto & Windus. 1985 [1959].
- Shut Up, He Explained (1962) (Edited by Henry Morgan, Babette Rosmond)
- Ring Around Max: The Correspondence of Ring Lardner and Max Perkins (1973) (Edited by Clifford Caruthers)
- Letters from Ring (1979) (Edited by Clifford Caruthers; foreword by Ring Lardner Jr.)
- Ring Lardner's You Know Me Al: The Comic Strip Adventures of Jack Keefe (1979) (Preface By Al Capp Illustrated by Will B. Johnstone Dick Dorgan)
- Ring Around the Bases: The Complete Baseball Stories of Ring Lardner. Charles Scribner's Sons. 1992. ISBN 978-0-684-19374-8. (Edited by Matthew Bruccoli)
- Letters of Ring Lardner (1995) (Edited by Clifford Caruthers)
- Hilton, George W., ed. (1995). The Annotated Baseball Stories of Ring W. Lardner, 1914-1919. Stanford University Press. ISBN 978-0-8047-2963-5.
- Selected Stories. Penguin. May 1, 1997. ISBN 978-0-14-118018-2.
- The Lost Journalism of Ring Lardner. University of Nebraska Press. January 1, 2017. ISBN 978-0-8032-6973-6. (Edited by Ron Rapoport Foreword James Lardner)
- Rapoport, Ron, ed. (2024). Frank Chance's Diamond: The Baseball Journalism of Ring Lardner. Rowman & Littlefield. ISBN 978-1-4930-8099-1.

=== Essays and other contributions ===
- Lardner, Ring (April 18, 1925). "The constant Jay". The New Yorker. Vol. 1, no. 9. p. 20.

== See also ==
- Donald Elder, author of Ring Lardner, A Biography

== Sources ==
- Grift, Josephine Van de (October 18, 1922). "Humor's sober side: Ring Lardner tells about it in interview of series on how humorists get that way". Bisbee Daily Review. Bisbee, Arizona. Newspaper Enterprise Association. p. 4.
