= James L. Lardner =

United States Navy admiral

James Lawrence Lardner
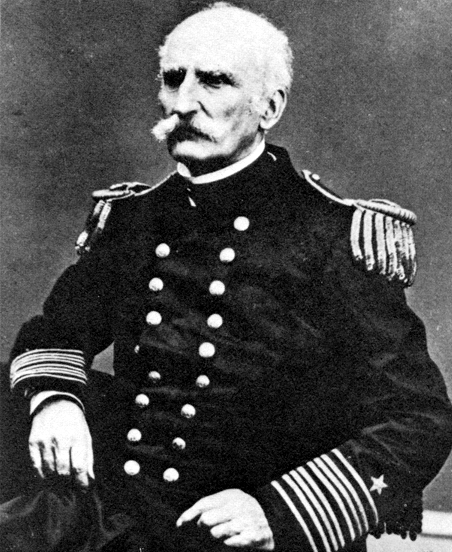
- Born: November 20, 1802; Philadelphia, Pennsylvania, U.S.
- Died: April 12, 1881 (aged 78); Philadelphia, Pennsylvania, U.S.
- Burial place: Trinity Oxford Episcopal Churchyard
- Relatives: Ring Lardner (nephew)
- Military career
- Allegiance: United States
- Branch: United States Navy
- Service years: 1820–1871
- Rank: Rear admiral
- Commands: USS Porpoise; USS Dale; USS Susquehanna; East Gulf Blockading Squadron; West India Squadron
- Conflicts: American Civil War

James Lawrence Lardner (November 20, 1802 – April 12, 1881) was an officer in the United States Navy during the American Civil War.

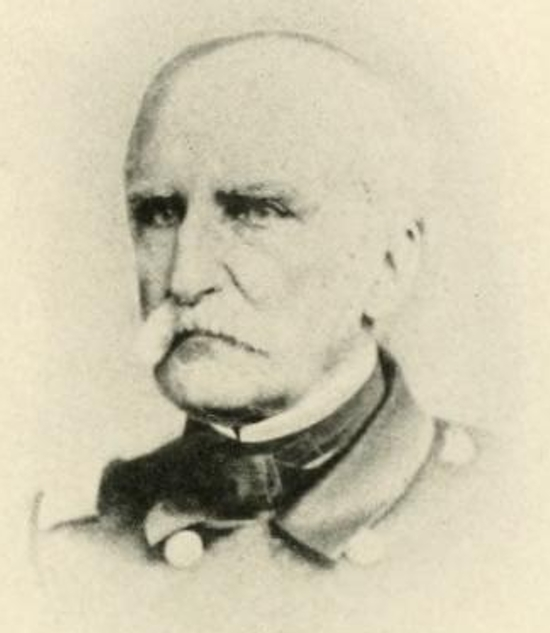
James Lardner

== Biography ==
Born at Philadelphia, Pennsylvania, he was the sixth son of John Lardner and Margaret (née Saltar) Lardner. Lardner was appointed midshipman on May 10, 1820. He served in the Pacific Squadron from 1821 to 1824, and joined the Mediterranean Squadron in 1825 after escorting General Lafayette in Brandywine back to France.

He received promotion to lieutenant on May 17, 1828, and served as navigating officer of the sloop Vincennes on her historic circumnavigation, and then served on the flagships of the Mediterranean, Brazil and Pacific Squadrons. In 1850 he sailed for the coast of Africa in the brig Porpoise and was promoted to commander on May 17, 1851. Lardner spent three years as commander of Porpoise and the sloop-of-war Dale in the Africa Squadron before returning to Boston, Massachusetts, in 1853. He was promoted to the rank of captain, on May 19, 1861.

In September 1861, during the Civil War, Lardner, in command of the frigate Susquehanna, took a pertinent part in the Battle of Port Royal and the capture of Forts Walker and Beauregard. He was commended for gallantry in action by Rear Admiral Samuel F. Du Pont; his name was sent to Congress for a vote of thanks by President Abraham Lincoln. In May 1862, he assumed command of the East Gulf Blockading Squadron and was promoted to commodore on July 16, 1862. In December 1862 he returned to Philadelphia to recover from a severe attack of yellow fever. From May 1863 to October 1864, Lardner commanded the West India Squadron.

After his retirement on November 20, 1864, he was appointed rear admiral on July 25, 1866. He served on special duty with various boards until 1869, when he was appointed Governor of the Naval Asylum, Philadelphia. He held this post until 1871.

Lardner died on April 12, 1881, in Philadelphia.

== Namesakes ==
Two United States Navy destroyers have been named USS Lardner for him.

== Personal life ==
Lardner married Margaret Wilmer on February 2, 1832, and they had three children, two of whom died in infancy. After his wife's death on April 25, 1846, he married her sister, Ellen Wilmer and had two further sons.

It was because of James Lawrence Lardner that one of his nephews came to be known as Ring Lardner: James Lardner was a friend of Cadwalader Ringgold, another Navy officer who also became a rear admiral. James Lardner named one of his sons "Ringgold Wilmer Lardner", and James' brother gave exactly the same name to his own son after the newborn's cousin. Ring Lardner never liked his given name and shortened it, yet he "lost the battle" when his son, Ring Lardner, Jr. was named after him.
