= Mutiny (1952 film) =

1952 film by Edward Dmytryk

- Directed by: Edward Dmytryk
- Written by: Hollister Noble (story); Philip Yordan (writer) and Sidney Harmon (writer); Charles O'Neal (additional dialogue)
- Produced by: Frank King; Maurice King
- Starring: Mark Stevens; Angela Lansbury; Patric Knowles
- Cinematography: Ernest Laszlo
- Edited by: Frank Sullivan
- Music by: Dimitri Tiomkin
- Production company: King Brothers Productions
- Distributed by: United Artists
- Release dates: March 5, 1952 (New York City); March 12, 1952 (Los Angeles); March 19, 1952 (United States)
- Running time: 77 minutes
- Country: United States
- Language: English

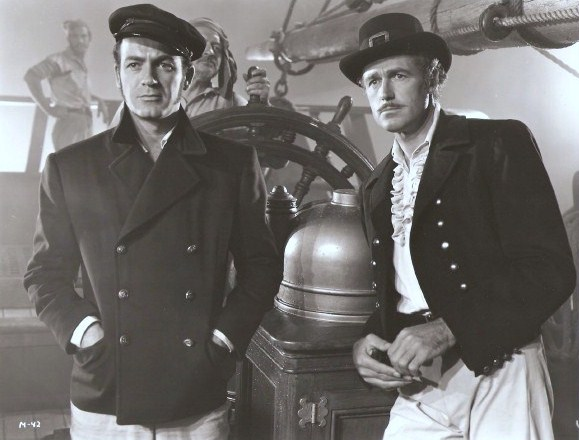
Mark Stevens and Patric Knowles

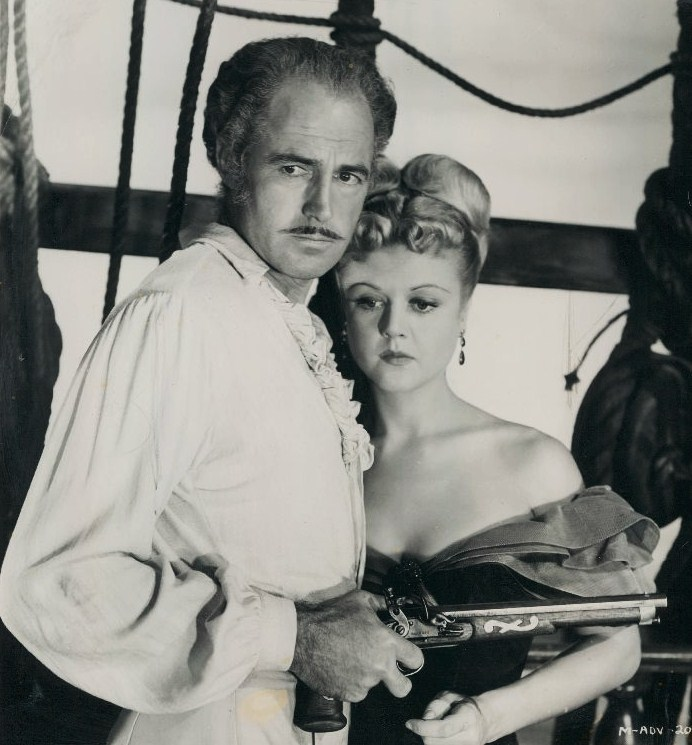
Patric Knowles and Angela Lansbury

Mutiny (styled as Mutiny! in some marketing materials) is a 1952 American Technicolor adventure film directed by Edward Dmytryk and starring Mark Stevens, Angela Lansbury and Patric Knowles. The film was produced by the King Brothers Productions and the plot is based on a story by Hollister Noble, who had written the source material for the King Brothers' Drums in the Deep South (1951).

== Plot ==
During the War of 1812, Captain James Marshall undertakes a mission to operate a blockade of the American coastline and collect a war loan in gold from France to bolster the fledgling American fleet against the British Navy.

Marshall asks Ben Waldridge, a former Royal Navy captain, to be his first officer on board the Concord, purported to be fastest American ship. Waldridge helps Marshall by assembling a crew consisting mostly of his loyal former gun crew that is led by Hook and Redlegs. They are surprised and suspicious to learn that Waldridge will not be their captain.

The crew is not told the true purpose of the mission. However, Redlegs lowers Hook over the side of the ship to eavesdrop outside the captain's window. He overhears Marshall and Waldridge discussing the $10 million in gold that they are to return to the U.S.

Realizing that there will be gold coming aboard, Hook and Redlegs plot a mutiny and assume that Waldridge will participate and take command as captain. They reveal to Waldridge that they know the purpose of the mission. Waldridge swears them to secrecy, but they inform their crewmates, who each tries to determine the amount of his individual share.

After arriving off the coast of France at Le Havre, Waldridge's former sweetheart Leslie is brought aboard after Marshall and Waldridge take an excursion into the town in a small boat. Hook and Redlegs assume that the gold is hidden in her luggage and search it but find nothing. Leslie suggests to Hook and Redlegs that the gold might have been brought aboard in the form of a large anchor. At the front of the ship, they scratch the surface of the anchor, which reveals the gold. With the discovery, the mutiny plan is revived, but the ship must first escape the English Channel and return home. The ship evades a British man-of-war, during which Marshall saves Waldridge's life. Later in the voyage, the mutinous plot is sprung.

Leslie convinces Waldridge to mutiny and steal the gold. Marshall tells Waldridge that he wants to present the trip as a joint command. The crew raids the armory and Marshall is advised that the crew is taking command of the ship. The crew grabs Marshall and Waldridge orders him to be taken below. Waldridge tells Leslie that he will release Marshall when they reach Havana. Leslie argues that Marshall should be killed.

Waldridge offers Marshall a chance to escape through a porthole into the ocean. Waldridge creates the appearance that he had shot Marshall, and the mutineers are convinced. Marshall paddles to shore and arrives in Georgia. He recovers and is located by the navy. He convinces the naval officers to head to Havana, where Waldridge will attempt to sell the gold. Waldridge and the crew melt the gold.

Marshall devices a plan to trick the crew by offering them grog with the help of a fisherman. The crew becomes inebriated, allowing Marshall and the navy to board the ship, quickly overtaking the crew. With the British ship Brittanica nearing them, Marshall orders his ship to scuttled. Leslie tries to shoot Marshall, but Waldridge shoots her first. Waldridge is arrested but has a plan to use the submersible to damage the Brittanica. He and Marshall depart in the submersible, but the force of the explosion damages the submersible and they cannot surface. They try to escape through the hatch, but only Marshall can reach the surface.

The navy notes that Waldridge died in the line of duty.

== Cast ==
- Mark Stevens as Capt. James Marshall
- Angela Lansbury as Leslie
- Patric Knowles as Capt. Ben Waldridge
- Gene Evans as Hook
- Rhys Williams as Redlegs
- Robert Osterloh as Feversham, gunner
- Peter Brocco as Sykes, gunner
- Emerson Treacy as Council Speaker
- Morris Ankrum as Capt. Radford
- Todd Karns as Andrews
- Harry Antrim as Caleb Parsons

== Production ==
The film was the first directed by Edward Dmytryk after he had testified before the House Un-American Activities Committee (HUAC). Dmytryk was a member of the Hollywood Ten and was the first to direct a Hollywood film since testifying. HUAC chairman John Stephens Wood supported Dmytryk's return to work, saying that it encouraged future testimony.

== Soundtrack ==
- "A-Rovin'" (traditional sea shanty)
- "Sailor's Holiday" (traditional sea shanty)

== Reception ==
In a contemporary review for the Los Angeles Times, critic John L. Scott of the Los Angeles Times wrote: "Action is plentiful in this movie and characters, including, Evans as Hook, a piratical figure, colorful. The story goes a bit haywire along the way, veering off a main course into side play ...Performances are as convincing as the plot will allow."

Variety wrote: "Unfortunately, after building so elaborately to stress the patriotic yen of Stevens and his daring in setting out with a lightly-armed boat to get the French gold, the story falls to pieces."

The film earned $1.2 million at the box office.

== Comic-book adaptation ==
- Eastern Color Movie Love #16 (August 1952)
