= Miller House (Washington, D.C.) =

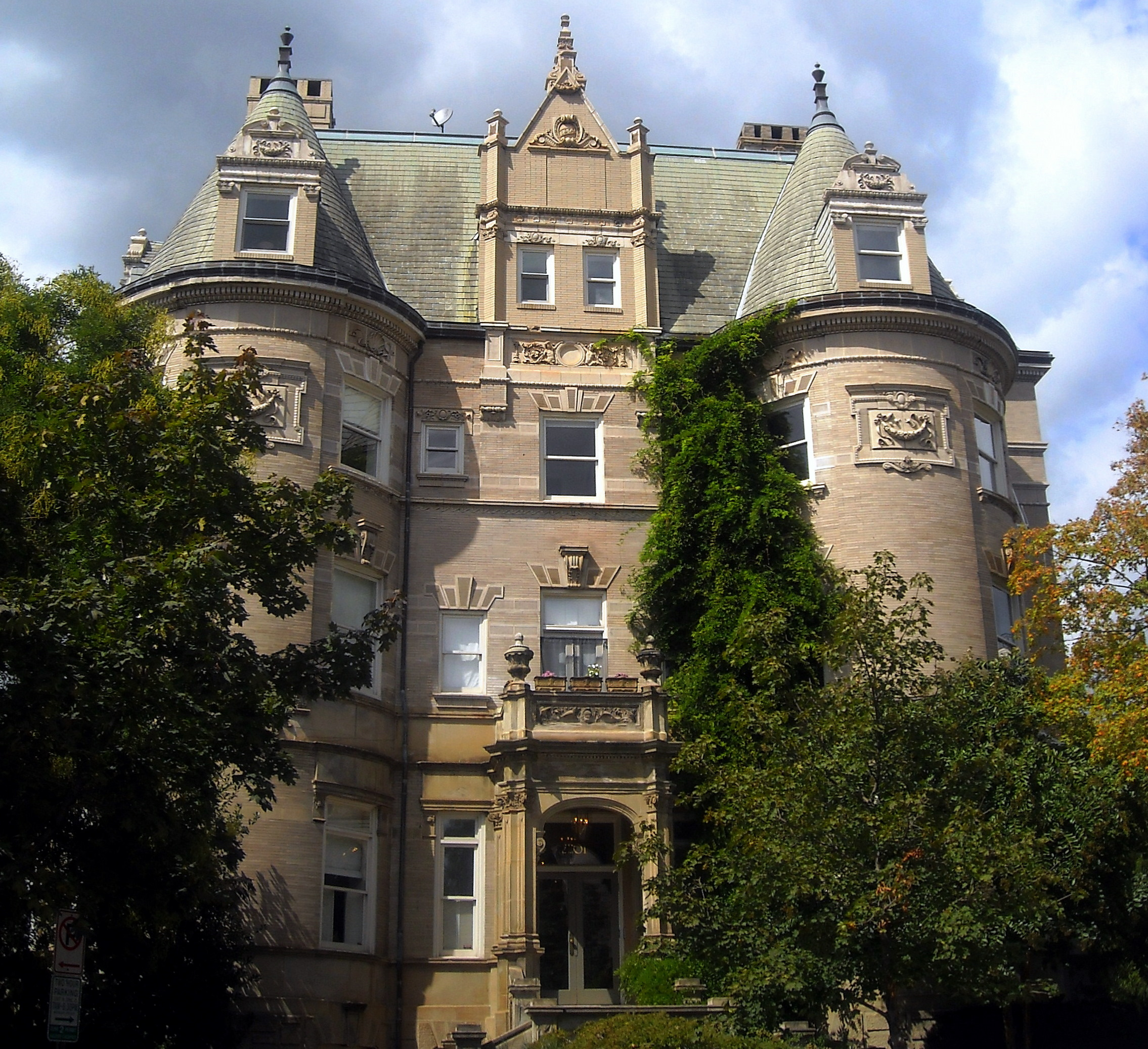
- The Miller House in September 2008
- Interactive map of the Miller House area
- Alternative names: Argyle House

General information
- Architectural style: Chateauesque
- Location: Sheridan-Kalorama, 2201 Massachusetts Avenue N.W., Washington, D.C.
- Coordinates: 38.911528°N 77.048835°W
- Completed: 1901

Design and construction
- Architect: Paul J. Pelz

Miller House is a mansion on the Embassy Row section of Massachusetts Avenue in Washington, D.C. It has been described as "the finest surviving mansion" designed by Paul J. Pelz, the main architect of the Library of Congress.

== History ==
=== 20th century ===
Designed by Pelz in the Northern Renaissance style, the house was built in 1900-01 for Commander Frederick Augustus Miller (1842–1909). Because Miller had been a U.S. Navy officer during the U.S. Civil War the house includes a number of maritime motifs, including the statue of a ship's cat on the ledge facing Massachusetts Avenue.

The house was sold by Miller's widow in 1913 and changed hands several times afterwards. During most of the 1920s it was owned by Washington developer Harry Wardman or his business partners. In 1923–26 it was leased to the Costa Rican and Salvadorean Legations. Like many mansions in Northwest Washington, D.C., it was then divided into apartments during the Great Depression and rented as a boarding house. In the early 1960s it was owned by Oscar Cox, who in 1940–41 had been instrumental in drafting and administering the Lend-Lease Act.

In 1984, the house's owner, Scott McLeod, started its renovation. During the works that same year, a fire destroyed many of the house's internal features. The owner decided to preserve and repair the exterior structure and to rebuild inside on a design by Richard Ridley, a local architect and author of the Washington Post's Making Space column from 1982 to 1988. The project was completed in 1986 and won a Dupont Circle Conservancy Historic Preservation Award.

=== 21st century ===
In the early 21st century, the house has been managed by a condominium association under the name "Argyle House".

An integral part of the house is the former garage on 22nd Street, also built in 1900–01 and "apparently the first [automobile garage] in Washington," actually intended for an electric car. From 1986 to 2009 it was used by Olga Hirshhorn, widow of entrepreneur and philanthropist Joseph Hirshhorn, to host part of her art collection. Hirschhorn named the 500-square-foot structure her "Mouse House", in playful reference to the house's cat statue. In 2009 the contents of the "Mouse House" were displayed at the Bruce Museum of Arts and Science in Greenwich, Connecticut and then at the Baker Museum in Naples, Florida where they have since been donated to the permanent exhibition.

== In media ==
In its January 2020 issue, Washingtonian included the rooftop cat sculpture as Ceramic Cat among its list of 93 "hidden gems" in Washington D.C., titled "Off-the-Beaten-Path Things to See and Do".

== Gallery ==
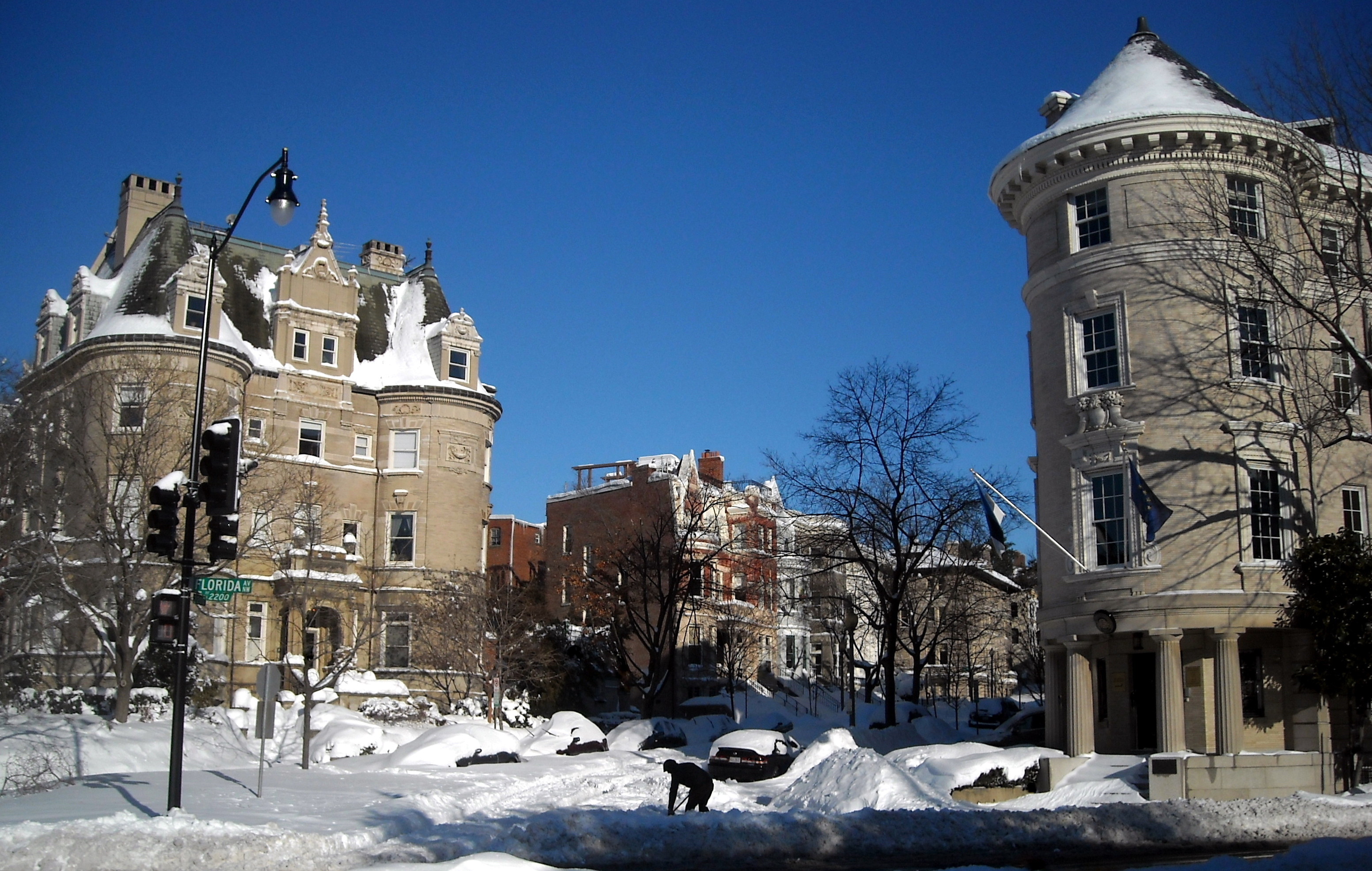
The Miller house during the 2010 blizzard, with the Estonian Embassy in front

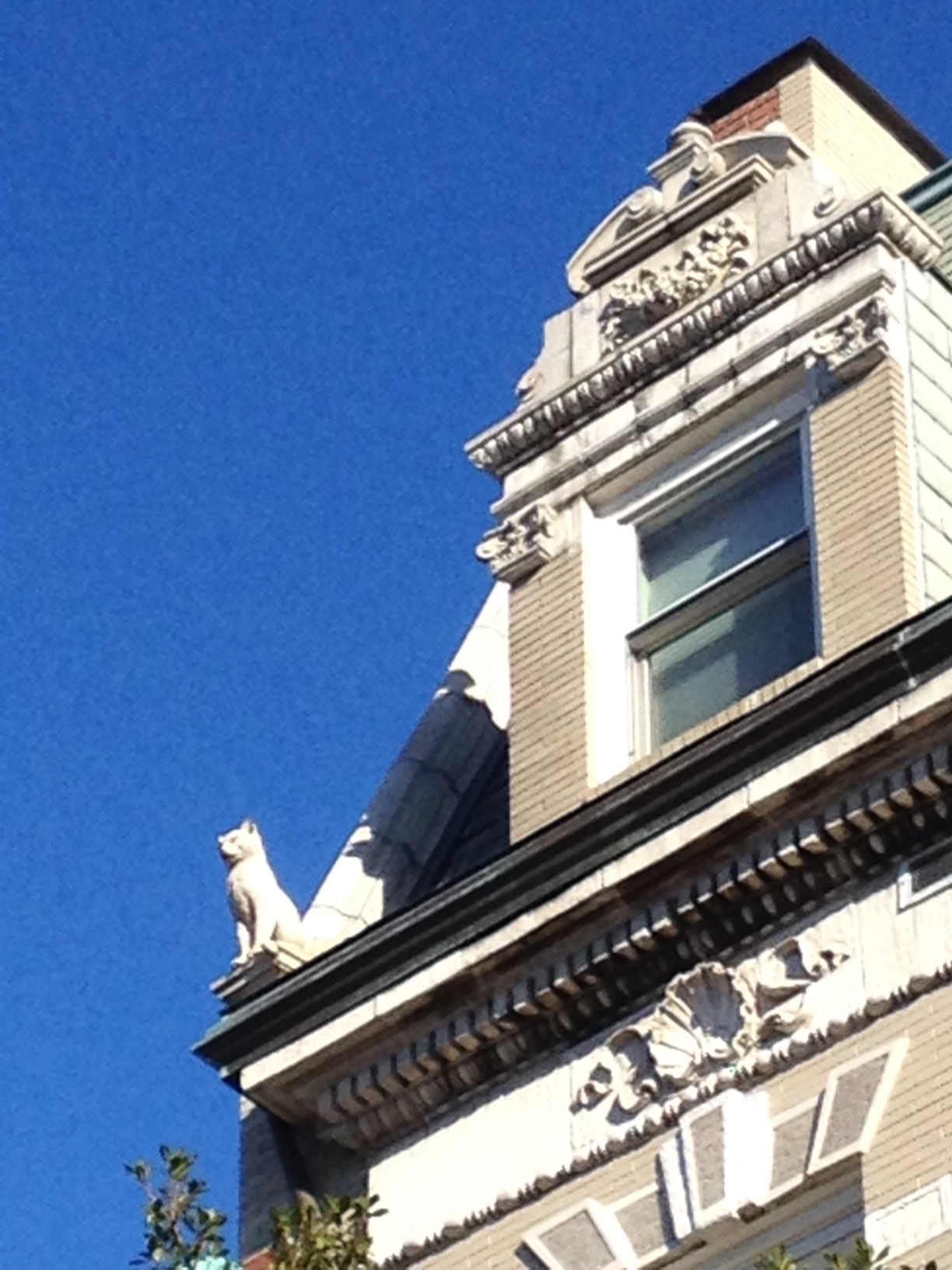
Cat statue on the roof

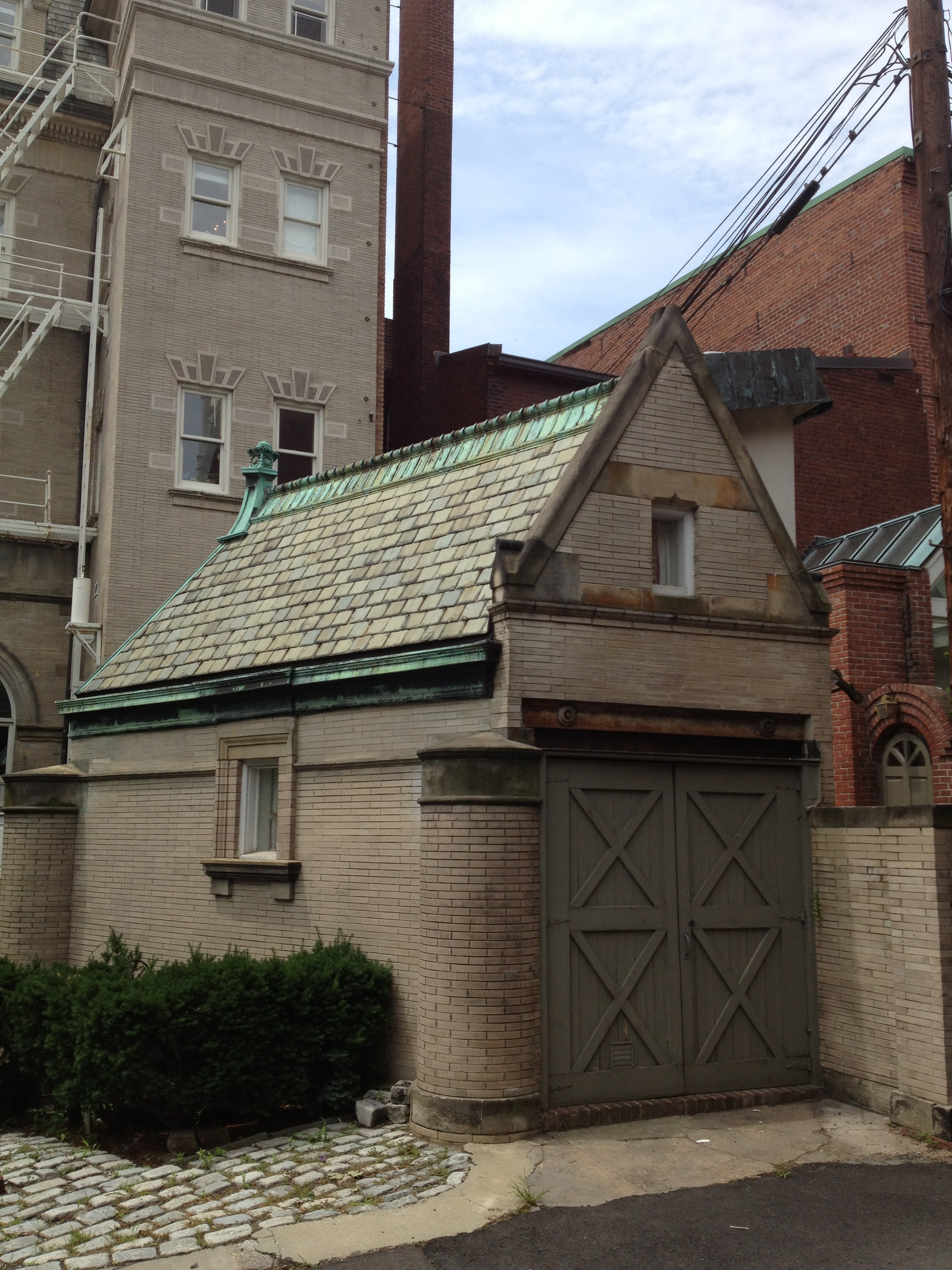
Former garage, later "Mouse House"

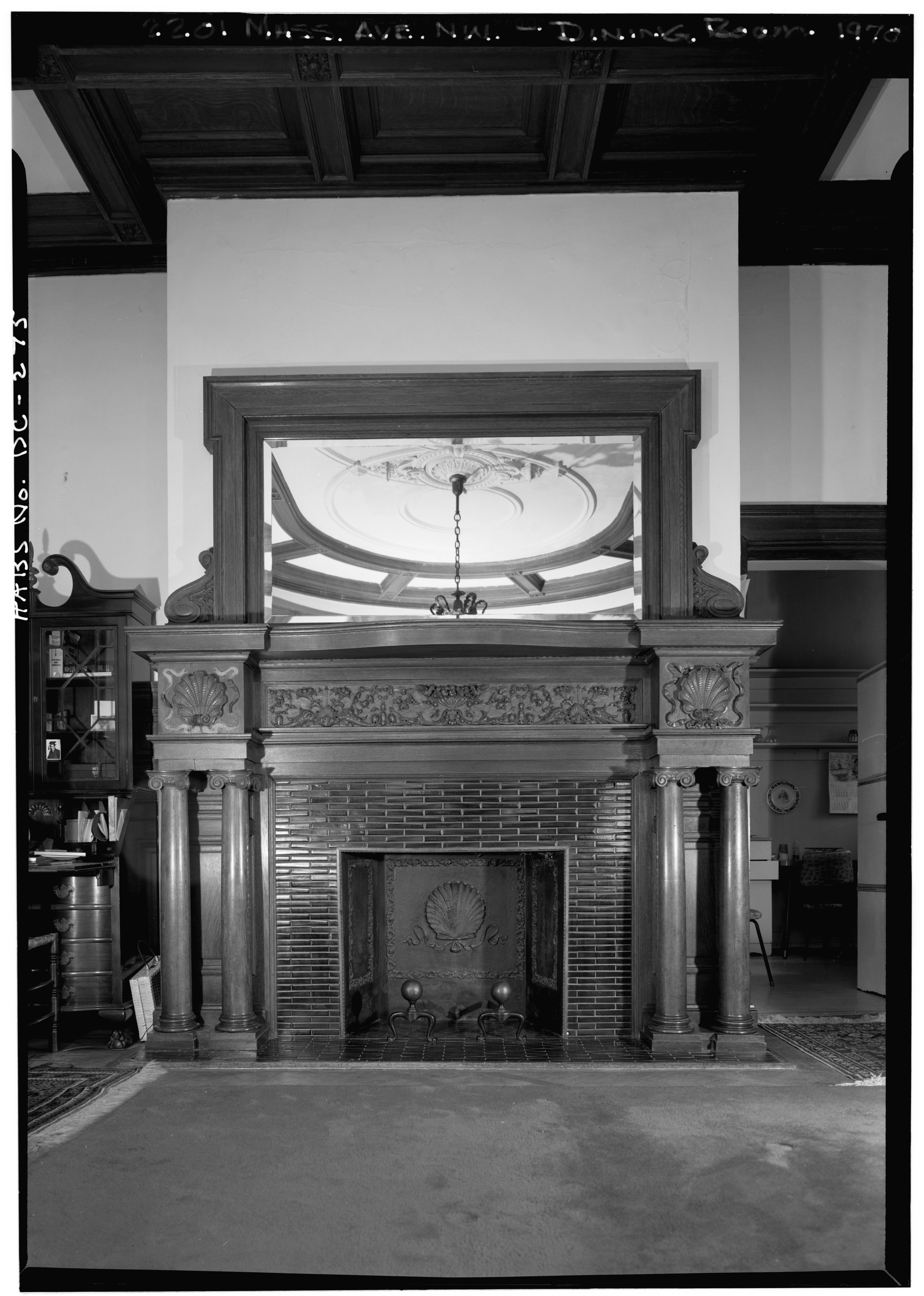
Dining room in 1970 (destroyed by fire in 1984)

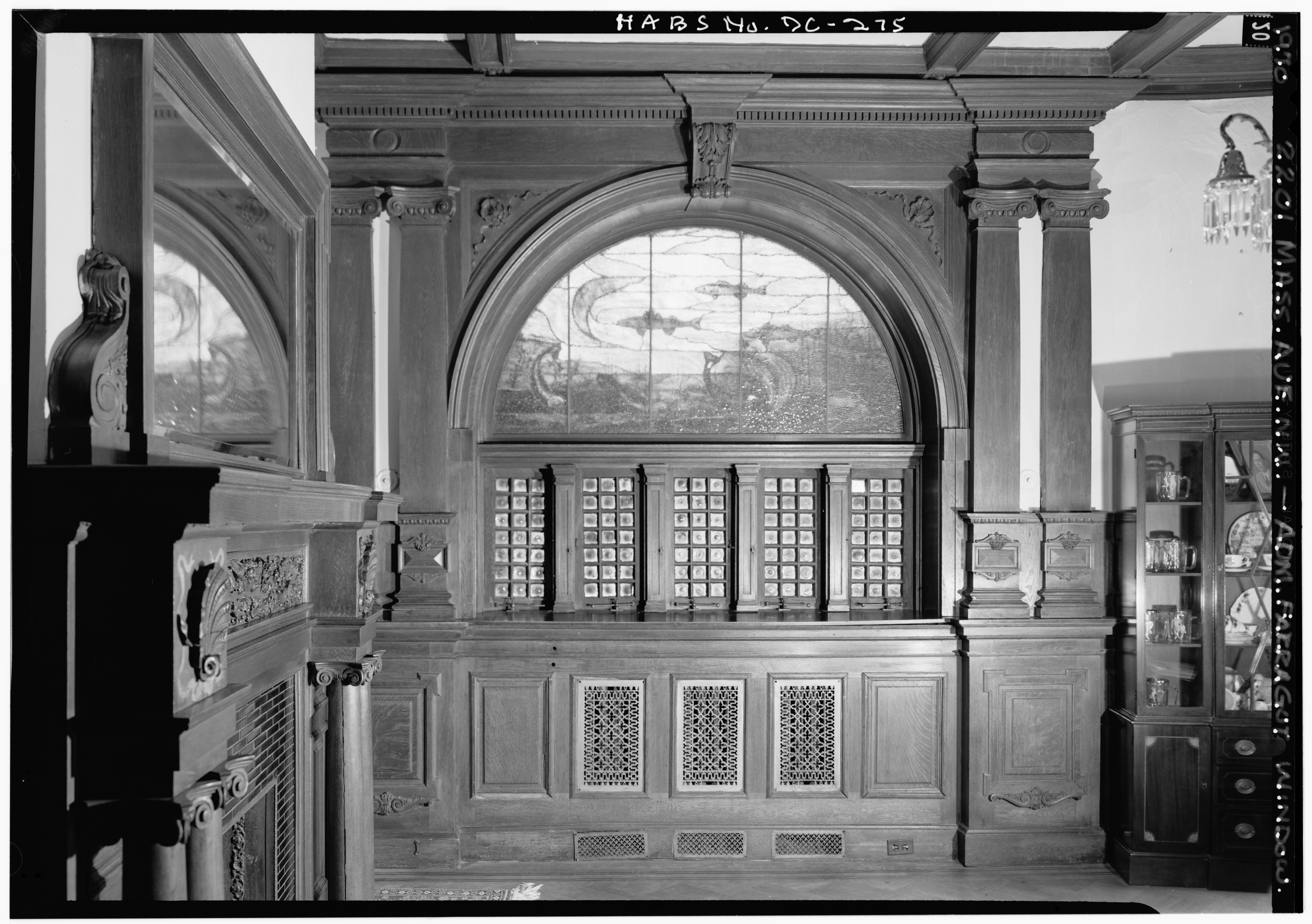
Window dedicated to David Farragut (destroyed by fire in 1984)
