= William Trevelyan Harry =

British geologist and academic author

William Trevelyan Harry FRSE FGS (1911–1964) was a British geologist and academic author. He specialised in the geology of Greenland and north-east Canada.

== Life ==
He was born in Yorkshire in northern England around 1911.

In the Second World War he did military service in Burma, interrupting his university career at Leeds University, where he eventually graduated BSc in 1947. He thereafter immediately began a career as a lecturer in Geology at University College, Dundee. In 1955 he transferred to St Andrews University as a Senior Lecturer.

In 1961 he was elected a Fellow of the Royal Society of Edinburgh. His proposers were Charles Findlay Davidson, James Ernest Richey, James Phemister, William Quarrier Kennedy and Harald Irving Drever.

He died on 20 June 1964.

== Publications ==
- Mineral Layering in some Granite Intrusions, SW Greenland (1960)
- Gneisses of the Kipawa District, Western Quebec (1961)
- The Nunarssuit Intrusive Complex, South Greenland (1963)
- The Pre-Cambrian Basement of AlGangorssuaq, South Greenland (1964)
- Anorthosite Xenoliths and Plagioclase Megacrysts of South Greenland (1968)

== Family ==
He married Dorothy May Stowe and had one son, William R Harry.
