= Oakwood School (Los Angeles) =

- North Hollywood, California

Information
- Established: 1951
- CEEB code: 052146
- Head of school: Jaime A. Dominguez
- Teaching staff: 289
- Grades: K-12
- Gender: Co-educational
- Enrollment: 832 (2026)
- Student to teacher ratio: 8:1
- Colors: Red, Black, White
- Athletics conference: California Interscholastic Federation (CIF) - Southern Section; Liberty League
- Team name: Owls
- Newspaper: The Parliament
- Tuition: Lower School: $47,830 Upper School: $57,550 New Student Fee: $2,500
- Website: https://www.oakwoodschool.org/

Oakwood School is a K-12, coeducational, independent day school located in North Hollywood, a neighborhood of Los Angeles, California. The school operates two campuses: the Elementary Campus, located on Moorpark Street, which serves students in kindergarten through grade 6, and the Secondary Campus, located on Magnolia Boulevard, which serves students in grades 7 through 12. Oakwood's educational philosophy emphasizes independence of thought, intellectual integrity, sensitivity to the needs of others, and participation in a democratic society.

== History ==
Founded in 1951 by a group of parents including Robert and Jessica Ryan, Sidney Harmon, Elizabeth Schappert, Wendy and Ross Cabeen, and Charles and Emilie Haas, Oakwood School was established by a group of parents who sought to create a progressive educational environment with an emphasis on the arts, sciences, and humanities. It was founded in the backyard of actor Robert Ryan and his wife Jessica in North Hollywood, California. The elementary school was purchased in 1951 and initially served as the school's only campus. In 1952, the school moved from the Ryans' backyard to a new location on Moorpark Street and received its seal of incorporation the same year.

== Campuses ==
=== Elementary School ===
Elementary Campus

Location
- 11230 Moorpark Street; North Hollywood, California 91602-2602; United States; 34.150250°N 118.375911°W

Information
- Established: 1951
- Teaching staff: 25 (2025)
- Grades: K-6
- Enrollment: 318 (2025)
- Student to teacher ratio: 1:11

Oakwood's elementary school campus has been located on Moorpark Street since 1952. The campus has expanded over time through the renovation and repurposing of existing buildings and the addition of facilities supporting academic, arts, and media programs. These facilities include the Story Center and Media Lounge, Music Studio, Science Center, and two art studios serving different grade levels. The campus also includes the Da Vinci Lab and 4th Grade Classroom Complex, a two-story facility that provides space for STEAM education and design-related projects.

Secondary Campus

Location
- 11600 Magnolia Blvd; North Hollywood, California 91601-3015; 34°09′54.0″N 118°23′01.7″W

Information
- Established: 1964
- Grades: 7-12
- Enrollment: 520 (2025)
- Test average: Average SAT Score: 1370; Average ACT Score: 32

=== Secondary School ===
Oakwood's secondary campus is located on Magnolia Boulevard in North Hollywood. The grounds were purchased from St. David's Church in 1968, and the campus opened that year. The campus has since expanded to include several academic and extracurricular facilities, including the Math-Science Building, completed in 1994, which houses science and mathematics classrooms. Other facilities on or associated with the campus include spaces for performing arts, music, dance, athletics, and student activities.

==== Music, Dance, and Athletic Center ====
The Music, Dance, and Athletic Center opened in 1999 and is located across the street from Oakwood's main secondary campus. The two-story building includes a gymnasium, performing arts studios, and underground parking. The first floor contains the gymnasium, weight and training rooms, locker rooms, offices, and support spaces. The second floor contains instrumental and choral music studios, dance studios, and practice rooms.

==== Pedestrian Bridge ====
Pedestrian Bridge

In January 2017, Oakwood opened a 114-foot pedestrian bridge spanning Magnolia Boulevard and connecting the northern and southern portions of the secondary school campus. Designed by Levin & Associates Architects as part of the school's campus master plan, the bridge includes an enclosed walkway with stainless steel mesh safety barriers, stairs, and an elevator. It was prefabricated off-site and installed in one piece using a crane, requiring an eight-hour street closure.

The pedestrian bridge received the Infrastructure — Award of Excellence from the Structural Engineers Association of Southern California (SEAOSC) in 2017 as part of the association's structural engineering awards program.

==== The Fields at North Hollywood Park ====
In 2025, Oakwood School partnered with the City of Los Angeles to renovate fields at the northwest corner of North Hollywood Park. Located approximately half a mile from Oakwood’s secondary campus, the fields were renovated for baseball, softball, soccer, and flag football.

== School Structure and Academic Programs ==
=== Educational Philosophy and Approach ===
Oakwood's educational approach emphasizes individual development, intellectual achievement, and participation in the school community. The school encourages students to develop independence and responsibility toward one another, the environment, and the broader community.

=== Elementary School (Grades K-6) ===
Beginning in kindergarten, Oakwood's elementary school curriculum includes mathematics, language arts, social studies, science, art, performing arts, Spanish, technology, and Explorations. The curriculum incorporates inquiry-based learning, real-world applications, critical thinking, problem-solving, and opportunities for creative expression.

=== Middle School (Grades 7-8) ===
Oakwood’s middle school program includes computer science, English, humanities, STEAM, the arts, mathematics, and world languages. The curriculum also emphasizes community participation, cultural competencies, and social-emotional learning, which supports students as they navigate the developmental, social, and emotional changes of adolescence.

=== High School (Grades 9-12) ===
Oakwood’s high school academic program incorporates constructivist pedagogy, individualized instruction, and an emphasis on academic achievement and personal development. The school’s curriculum extends beyond traditional college-preparatory coursework and is designed to support students’ academic and personal development. Oakwood offers college counseling to help students explore their academic, artistic, and athletic interests, develop self-awareness, and navigate the college application process. Oakwood calculates both weighted and unweighted grade-point averages (GPAs), with an unweighted mean GPA of 3.73 for the Class of 2026, and does not rank students. Over the past four years, 99% of Oakwood graduates have enrolled in colleges and universities, including Stanford University, Princeton University, Brown University, the University of California, Berkeley, the University of California, Los Angeles, the University of Southern California, New York University, and the University of Pennsylvania.

=== Immersion Program ===
Oakwood’s Immersion program is a two-week experience in which students participate in projects and activities based on their interests. It includes hands-on projects, creative inquiry, and experiential learning opportunities. Past Immersion experiences have included travel within the United States and international trips to countries including Costa Rica, Mexico, and Ecuador.

=== STEAM ===
Oakwood School's STEAM program integrates science, technology, engineering, art, and mathematics through interdisciplinary coursework, experimentation, and design projects. The school's Engineering Lab is equipped with 3D printers, CNC routers, waterjet and laser cutters, design stations, and power tools. Students can also compete in the Horizon Educational Hydrogen Grand Prix (H2GP), an international engineering and endurance competition in which teams design and race 1:10-scale hydrogen-powered cars.

== Arts ==
At the elementary school, the art curriculum focuses on artistic skills and creative expression. Students work in two art studios and use a range of media and techniques. Instruction includes art history and contemporary art, as well as interdisciplinary projects developed in collaboration with classroom teachers to connect art with other academic subjects.

The secondary school's visual arts program covers visual communication, artistic techniques, and the cultural and historical contexts of art. Students develop technical skills and vocabulary for discussing their own work and that of other artists. Course offerings include ceramics, drawing and painting, film and video, photography, and sculpture.

Through Oakwood's partnership with the California Institute of the Arts, middle school students can take additional courses in the performing and visual arts, including dance, music, theater, and visual arts.

== Athletics ==
Oakwood School is a member of the California Interscholastic Federation–Southern Section (CIF-SS) and competes in several Southern California leagues, including the Prep League, Gold Coast League, Mission League, Liberty League, and Junior High Delphic League. The school offers more than 14 sports and club sports across its elementary, middle, and high school programs. According to school data, 84% of middle school students and 56% of high school students participate in at least one sport at Oakwood.

== In the News ==
=== Period. End of Sentence ===
In 2013, Oakwood students and English teacher Melissa Berton initiated The Pad Project after learning about the effects of menstrual stigma and limited access to menstrual products on girls' education during a visit to the United Nations Commission on the Status of Women. The students raised funds to provide a village in India with a low-cost sanitary pad-making machine and collaborated on Period. End of Sentence., a documentary short about the project. The film won the Academy Award for Best Documentary Short in 2019. The Pad Project developed into a nonprofit organization focused on menstrual equity and education.

=== Oakwood and AIDS Walk LA ===
Oakwood School students have participated in AIDS Walk Los Angeles since the event began in 1985. The school is one of four groups to have participated in every walk since its inception. The school's involvement began amid public opposition to AIDS activism and has continued as an annual student-led fundraising and community service effort supporting HIV/AIDS services through APLA Health. In 2026, Oakwood raised more than $62,000 for the AIDS Walk Los Angeles.

== Notable Alumni ==
- Mitchell Butler, sports agent and former professional basketball player
- Lily-Rose Depp, actress and singer
- Joey Dosik, musician, singer, and songwriter
- Alex Ebert, Golden Globe and Grammy-winning musician
- Maury Ginsberg, theater, film and television actor
- Andrew Gold, multi-instrumentalist, singer, songwriter, and record producer
- Madison Love, songwriter and singer
- Elizabeth McGovern, actress
- Chris O'Loughlin, Olympic fencer
- Chris Pine, actor
- Wendy Waldman, singer, songwriter, and record producer
- Mark Wexler, documentary filmmaker and photojournalist
- Carnie Wilson, singer and television personality
- Wendy Wilson, singer and television personality
- True Whitaker, actress
- Noah Wyle, Golden Globe and Emmy-winning actor, television director, producer and writer
- Moon Zappa, actress, singer, and author
