= Mara Maru =

1952 film by Gordon Douglas

- 1952 theatrical poster
- Directed by: Gordon Douglas
- Written by: N. Richard Nash
- Story by: Phillip Yordan; Sidney Harmon; Hollister Noble
- Produced by: David Weisbart
- Starring: Errol Flynn; Ruth Roman; Raymond Burr
- Cinematography: Robert Burks
- Edited by: Robert L. Swanson
- Music by: Max Steiner
- Production company: Warner Bros. Pictures
- Distributed by: Warner Bros. Pictures
- Release date: April 23, 1952
- Running time: 98 minutes
- Country: United States
- Language: English
- Box office: $1.5 million (U.S./Canada rentals)

Mara Maru is a 1952 American action film noir directed by Gordon Douglas and starring Errol Flynn, Ruth Roman and Raymond Burr. It is Flynn's final film for Warner Bros. Pictures, the studio where he started in Hollywood in 1935.

== Plot ==
Gregory Mason and Andy Callahan are partners in a salvage business in Manila. After Callahan is murdered, Mason is suspected by Lt. Zuenon of the police, as Callahan had threatened to kill Mason earlier that day in a bar and had harbored intense jealousy over a previous relationship between Mason and Callahan's wife Stella before their marriage. Although Stella had remained in love with Mason, they were not involved after the marriage.

Mason is arrested but released after Steven Ranier, a private investigator who had been working for Callahan, clears him, professing that he had witnessed Callahan's murder. Mason hires Ranier to protect him from and find Callahan's murderer. Ranier introduces Mason to Brock Benedict, a prosperous tropical fish dealer who wants Mason to find and recover diamonds valued at one million dollars that had sunk near the Philippine coast during World War II. Benedict knows that the diamonds had been aboard a PT boat that Mason had commanded, with Callahan serving as his executive officer. Benedict offers to split the proceeds equally with Mason and Stella, whom Benedict is pursuing romantically.

Benedict outfits a craft suitable for salvage work, the Mara Maru, persuading Mason to join him. Ranier and Stella accompany him, but Stella appears to be playing both sides against the middle until she discovers that Benedict is planning to kill Mason as soon as the treasure is found. She informs Mason and begs him to abandon the expedition and return with her to a normal life in the United States, but he again he opts for the pursuit of money.

Mason finds the box containing the treasure and brings it aboard the ship to discover that it is a diamond-encrusted crucifix from a Catholic cathedral in Manila. Benedict seizes it, and he and Ranier, who have been collaborating all along, agree to throw Mason overboard. Mason announces that he has smashed the ship's compass, forcing the men to relent.

A storm hits the ship and the three men fight over the crucifix while Mason's dive assistant Manuelo beaches the ship at his direction. Mason takes possession of the crucifix and he flees to the shore with Stella, and Manuelo, pursued by the others. Benedict kills the mercenary Ranier and is joined by his bodyguard in chasing Mason, Stella and Manuelo through the jungle. In a confrontation between Mason and Manuelo, Mason's greed causes him to beat Manuelo, a devout Catholic who insists that the cross be returned to Manila. When Stella upbraids Mason for his actions, Manuelo disappears with the crucifix.

Exhausted from his flight, Manuelo is caught near the church steps by Senor Ortega, the brother of the man aboard the PT boat who had originally taken the crucifix for safekeeping from the invading Japanese. The next morning, Mason appears at the church and wrests the cross from Ortega and is pursued by Benedict and his henchman. Ortega begs Mason to return the crucifix but is slain by Benedict while seeking to repel the assailants. Mason and Benedict fight, with Mason prevailing. Police arrive and arrest Benedict and his henchman. With the prospect of a reunion with Stella and a return to the U.S., he hands the crucifix to Manuelo.

== Cast ==
- Errol Flynn as Gregory Mason
- Ruth Roman as Stella Callahan
- Raymond Burr as Brock Benedict
- Paul Picerni as Steven Ranier
- Richard Webb as Andy Callahan
- Dan Seymour as Lt. Zuenon
- Georges Renavent as Ortega
- Robert Cabal as Manuelo
- Henry Marco as Perol
- Don C. Harvey as Larry
- Nestor Paiva as Captain Van Hoten

== Production ==
In January 1950, Warner Bros. Pictures announced that it had purchased the film's story from Philip Yordan, Sidney Harmon and Hollister Noble. Ivan Goff and Ben Roberts were originally reported as working on the script, which focused on five war veterans who buy a Japanese war boat and salvage a sunken war vessel. Everett Freeman was assigned to produce. In July 1950, Warner Bros. announced the film for the coming year.

In May 1951, David Weisbart was announced as producer. In September, Warner Bros. announced that Errol Flynn would star and that Gordon Douglas would direct, Richard Nash had written the script.

Mara Maru was filmed at Warner Bros. and at California locations including Newport Harbor, Balboa Island, Los Angeles harbor, Catalina Island and the San Fernando Mission (doubling for a Manila cathedral).

Douglas later recalled that Flynn "was great up until three o'clock in the afternoon. Shooting a scene about 2:30 he'd be fine. I'd go to his dressing room and we'd talk and he'd have what I thought was a glass of water. It was straight up gin or vodka. Then he'd go on set and be stoned. He'd start hamming it up. I'd yell 'Cut' and tell him 'You're really eating scenery, man.' He'd say 'No, I was fine.' I'd have the shot printed early and the next morning he'd be horrified when he saw the rushes. 'Get rid of that film!' he'd say. Errol was a nice person but unfortunately a terrible drinker. Believe me he would have died at twenty two if he'd done all the things he was credited for doing."

== Reception ==
In a contemporary review for The New York Times, critic Bosley Crowther called the film "dull diversion" and wrote: "The gobbledegookish title of Warner's 'Mara Maru' is not the only obscure and unexciting thing about this stale adventure film. Its wholly improbable build-up of a criss-cross of rivalries ... is bleakly confused and grossly tiresome, and when the action does finally get around to the business of diving for the treasure it is hackneyed and cheaply emotionalized. Even Errol Flynn and Ruth Roman as the working stars in its cast give the impression of being bored and indifferent toward it all."

Critic Philip K. Scheuer of the Los Angeles Times wrote: "While its scenes of sheer physical action are scarcely original ... they keep one's eyes focused on the screen with a fair degree of absorption. What ails the overall operation is that its performers talk too darn much, particularly between salvaging sorties. ... Overlong, 'Mara Maru' is not one of Warners' more compelling melodramas."
