= Todd Karns =

American actor

- Karns in his film debut Andy Hardy's Private Secretary (1941)
- Born: Roscoe Todd Karns; January 15, 1921; Hollywood, California, U.S.
- Died: February 5, 2000 (aged 79); Ajijic, Jalisco, Mexico
- Resting place: Ajijic Cemetery
- Occupation: Actor
- Years active: 1941–1956
- Spouse: Katherine Karns (m. 1944–2000)
- Children: 3
- Father: Roscoe Karns

Roscoe Todd Karns (January 15, 1921 – February 5, 2000) was an American actor. He is perhaps best remembered for playing George Bailey's younger brother, Harry Bailey, in the 1946 film It's a Wonderful Life.

== Early life ==
Karns was the son of the well-known character actor Roscoe Karns and his wife Mary Fraso. He initially planned to have a career as a newspaper reporter, but participation in a theater production changed his mind, turning him toward acting.

== Career ==
=== Film ===
Karns started his film career in 1941 as Harry Land in two Andy Hardy movies with Mickey Rooney, but shortly after that, his beginning film career was interrupted by the Second World War, where Karns served in the Army Air Corps. When he returned to Hollywood, Karns portrayed his signature role as Harry Bailey in Frank Capra's Christmas classic It's a Wonderful Life (1946).

He often had minor film roles, such as in Good Sam (1948) and The Caine Mutiny (1954).

=== Television ===
Karns played Jackson Jones in Jackson and Jill (1949–1953), the first weekly situation comedy for television. He also appeared with his father Roscoe in the criminal series Rocky King, Detective (1950–1954), playing Sergeant Hart. He retired from film and television in the mid-1950s.

=== Painting ===
In addition to acting, Karns also made numerous paintings. He began painting in January 1948 and went on to sell his works to individuals and to businesses. A newspaper reporter wrote, "His style is strictly his own and bears no resemblance to anything ever heard in an art class or put in a book."

== Personal life ==
Karns and his wife Katherine with their three children moved to Mexico near Guadalajara where they opened the English-language venue, Lakeside Little Theater in 1971. There Karns produced and directed plays for the next three decades, until his death from cancer at age 79.

== Death ==
Karns died of cancer in Ajijic, Jalisco, Mexico, on February 5, 2000, at age 79. His wife and children had his private family interment in Ajijic's cemetery.

== Partial filmography ==
- Andy Hardy's Private Secretary (1941) as Harry Land
- The Courtship of Andy Hardy (1942) as Harry Land
- Eagle Squadron (1942) as Meyers
- It's a Wonderful Life (1946) as Harry Bailey
- Good Sam (1948) as Joe Adams
- Jackson and Jill (1949, TV series) as Jackson Jones
- My Foolish Heart (1949) as Her escort
- It's a Small World (1950) as Sam
- Let's Dance (1950) as Sergeant (uncredited)
- The Magnificent Yankee (1950) as Secretary (uncredited)
- Drums in the Deep South (1951) as Union Captain (uncredited)
- The Red Badge of Courage (1951) as Soldier (uncredited)
- Mutiny (1952) as Andrews
- Jet Job (1952) as Peter Arlen
- My Son John (1952) as Bedford (uncredited)
- The Story of Will Rogers (1952) as 1st Mechanic (scenes deleted)
- Battle Zone (1952) as Officer
- Flat Top (1952) as Judge
- Invaders from Mars (1953) as Jim as Gas Station Attendant (uncredited)
- Mission Over Korea (1953) as 2nd Lt. Jerry Barker (uncredited)
- Clipped Wings (1953) as Lt. Dave Moreno
- China Venture (1953) as Lt. March (uncredited)
- Sea of Lost Ships (1953) as Co-Pilot (uncredited)
- Rocky King, Detective (1953–1954, TV-series) as Sergeant Hart
- The Caine Mutiny (1954) as Petty Officer 1st Class Stillwell (uncredited)
