= Grace Carney =

American actress

- Born: September 15, 1911; Hartford, Connecticut
- Died: March 25, 2009 (aged 97); Westport, Connecticut
- Years active: 1929 - 1997

Grace Carney (September 15, 1911 - March 25, 2009) was an American actress who worked in early television and performed in both Broadway and off-Broadway stage productions. From 1950 through 1954, she played Mabel King on the Rocky King Detective television series. At the age of 67, Carney became president of United Tool and Die, a company that produced aircraft components.

Carney was born on September 15, 1911, in Hartford, Connecticut. Her father was John J. Carney, who founded United Tool and Die in the 1920s. After graduating from Hartford's Bulkeley High School, she moved to New York City to begin an acting career.

== Acting career ==
Early in Carney's career, she worked in theatrical stock companies and performed as part of the ensemble in her first Broadway show, Fantasia, in 1933. Her other Broadway stage credits include as Birdie Monyhan in Donnybrook! (1961), Madge (understudy) and Lizzy Sweeney (understudy) in Philadelphia, Here I Come! (1966), Mrs. Winemiller in Eccentricities of a Nightingale (1976), Angel in Vieux Carre (1977), Mrs. Snowden in Angel (1978), and Mrs. Polianoffsky in My Old Friends (1979).

Carney also found work in early television, when most TV shows were broadcast from New York City. On May 24, 1946, she played the Divorcee in Angels Don’t Marry, which was broadcast live on the DuMont Television Network. From 1949 to 1956, Carney had roles in at least four episodes of Kraft Television Theatre, including "Payment Deferred" (1949) and "Time Lock" (1956).

From 1950 to 1954, Carney played Mabel King on the DuMont Television Network series Rocky King Detective. As an economy measure, Carney was heard, but not seen, as the wife of Detective Rocky King. DuMont always suffered from limited funds, and in an early episode, Carney was asked to play both the detective's wife and a woman connected to the crime being investigated. Since the 30-minute series was broadcast live, Carney did not have enough time to change her clothing and make-up, so she spoke her Mabel lines offscreen. The audience enjoyed the novelty of a character who was never seen, and so Carney continued to speak her lines off camera.

Carney also had roles on The Phil Silvers Show and Route 66. She played Mrs. Weyderhaus in the 1970 film The Owl and the Pussycat.

== Businesswoman ==
In 1979, Carney became president of United Tool and Die to continue the family ownership of the company founded by her father. During her time as head of the company, she donated $1.2 million to the University of Hartford, to be used for scholarships. In 1997, after running United Tool and Die for 13 years, Carney turned over operations of the company to Joseph Wagner, a longtime employee and administrator.

Grace Carney died in Westport, Connecticut, on March 25, 2009, at the age of 97.
