= Carnival Story =

1954 film

- Directed by: Kurt Neumann
- Written by: Marcy Klauber; Charles Williams; Hans Jacoby; Kurt Neumann; Dalton Trumbo (uncredited); Michael Wilson (uncredited)
- Produced by: Frank King; Maurice King
- Starring: Anne Baxter; Steve Cochran; Lyle Bettger
- Cinematography: Ernest Haller
- Music by: Willy Schmidt-Gentner
- Production companies: King Brothers Productions; Westia Film
- Distributed by: RKO Radio Pictures
- Release date: April 16, 1954 (US)
- Running time: 95 minutes
- Countries: United States; West Germany
- Language: English
- Box office: $2 million (US)

Carnival Story

Carnival Story is a 1954 American-West-German drama film directed by Kurt Neumann, produced by Frank King and Maurice King, starring Anne Baxter and Steve Cochran, and released by RKO Radio Pictures. It was made as a co-production between West Germany and the United States.

Sometimes this film is credited as a 3D feature, although it wasn't filmed or exhibited in a three-dimensional process. This idea in many sources may be based on a wrong note from Variety in 1953. Neumann simultaneously directed a German language version Circus of Love with Bernhard Wicki, Eva Bartok, and Curd Jürgens.

The melodrama set in a circus was filmed at the Bavaria Studios in Munich and on location in the city. The sets were designed by the art directors Hans Kuhnert and Theo Zwierski. The film was shot in Agfacolor with prints by Technicolor.

== Plot ==
Grayson's Amerikanische Wunderschau ("American Show Of Wonders"), a traveling carnival, arrives in Munich with acts that include high-diver Frank Colloni and silent strongman Groppo. On the midway, local woman Willi picks the pocket of carny Joe Hammond. He catches her, takes an interest, and finds her a job in the cookhouse.

Willi and Joe become romantically involved. Frank offers to teach her the high dive, and after obtaining Joe's blessing, she accepts. On her first night as part of the act, Frank proposes. Willi doesn't love Frank, and tells Joe, whom she does love. Joe encourages her to marry Frank for his money, assuring her that the marriage won't come between them. Willi is furious at his attitude; she and Frank are soon married.

Photographer Bill Vines is putting together a magazine spread on the Great Collonis as the couple's fame grows. Frank beats Joe after catching him with Willi, and Joe is banished from the carnival. Shortly after, Frank plunges to his death when a ladder rung breaks.

Bill's pictures are published and he befriends Willi. Joe reappears and spends the night with Willi. In the morning he is gone, along with Willi's money. She is badly injured performing a dive and requires a lengthy stay in hospital. As she had become the major attraction, business dries up at the carnival, and it moves to Frankfurt.

Bill is a constant presence during Willi's convalescence and he wants to marry her, but she is reluctant. Against his wishes, she returns to the carnival. Joe is back too, but she is no longer interested. He reveals that he was responsible for Frank's supposed accident, and threatens to implicate her. Enraged by her rejection, Joe begins to strangle her. Groppo intervenes and kills Joe. Groppo is arrested; Bill comforts Willi.

== Cast ==
- Anne Baxter as Willi
- Steve Cochran as Joe Hammond
- Lyle Bettger as Frank Colloni
- George Nader as Bill Vines
- Helene Stanley as Peggy
- Jay C. Flippen as Charley Grayson
- Ady Berber as Groppo

== Release ==
King Brothers Productions later sued RKO for mismanaging the distribution and sale of the film, claiming $20,000 in damages.
