= Olga Hirshhorn =

American collector of 19th and 20th century art and supporter of art museums

Olga Hirshhorn (née Zatorsky) (April 26, 1920 – October 3, 2015) was an American collector of 19th and 20th century art and supporter of art museums.

== Early life ==
Olga Zatorsky was born in Greenwich, Connecticut, to immigrant parents from Ukraine. She graduated from Greenwich High School in 1939 and married her English teacher, John Cunningham, and they had three sons together. In 1964, she divorced Cunningham and married Joseph H. Hirshhorn, who died in 1981. She owned houses in Martha's Vineyard and Naples, Florida, where she died, aged 95, in 2015.

== Art collection ==
Her first purchase was a painting by Josef Albers, and she claims that she bought it for $2,000 which she could not believe she paid that much for a painting at the time. Over time she collected works by Willem de Kooning, Henry Moore and Man Ray as well as works from Asia and Africa. In 1995 she donated over 600 works to the Corcoran Gallery of Art in Washington, DC., estimated at the time to be worth about 10 million dollars, which surprised the art world since it had been expected that her art would go to the Hirshhorn Museum. She served on the boards of the Hirshhorn Museum as well as the Corcoran Gallery.

One of Hirshhorn's most noted collection was a collection of 197 small-art objects called "The Mouse House", in reference to their former location in Washington DC's historic Miller House. Among the objects in the collection are six Picassos, six de Koonings, seven Alexander Calder pieces, four pieces by Man Ray and individual paintings by Georgia O'Keeffe and Salvador Dalí. Hirshhorn donated her "Mouse House" collection to The Baker Museum in Naples, Florida, in 2013.

The Frick Collection contains various archives relating to Hirshhorn as well as an oral history completed in 1988. In 2012, she was awarded the Patron Award by the International Sculpture Center.

=== List of Artists in her collection ===
1. Sculptures by:
  1. Honoré Daumier
  2. Antoine-Louis Barye
  3. Auguste Rodin
  4. Alexander Calder
  5. Paul Manship
  6. Pablo Picasso
  7. Man Ray
  8. Alberto Giacometti
  9. David Smith
  10. Louise Nevelson
  11. Barbara Hepworth.
  12. Abel Chrétien
2. Paintings and works on paper by:
  1. Sonia Delaunay
  2. Salvador Dalí
  3. Max Weber
  4. Willem de Kooning
  5. Adolf Gottlieb
  6. Kenneth Noland
  7. Frederick Arthur Bridgman
  8. Larry Rivers
  9. Saul Steinberg.
  10. 19th-century giants such as James Abbott McNeill Whistler, Antoine-Louis Barye, Honoré Daumier, Alexandre Falguière and Auguste Rodin.
