= Rubber Racketeers =

1942 American film by Harold Young

- Directed by: Harold Young
- Written by: Henry Blankfort (original screenplay)
- Produced by: Maurice King associate Frank King
- Starring: Ricardo Cortez; Rochelle Hudson
- Cinematography: L. William O'Connell
- Edited by: Jack Dennis
- Production company: KB Productions
- Distributed by: Monogram Pictures; Associated Artists
- Release date: June 26, 1942
- Running time: 67 minutes
- Country: United States
- Language: English

Rubber Racketeers is a 1942 American crime film directed by Harold Young and starring Ricardo Cortez and Rochelle Hudson.

The film was inspired by tire rationing.

== Plot summary ==
Gilin is a gangster who has just gotten out of prison. One night while driving home with his girlfriend Nikki, he collides with defense worker Bill Barry and his fiancé Mary Dale. Bill's tires are destroyed. When Gilin's insurance company is unable to replace them, Nikki convinces him to exchange Bill's car for the car of Gilin's Chinese servant Tom, who has enlisted in the Army.

With government restrictions on rubber in place due to the war, Gilin goes into business stealing and re-selling good tires, then sells tires retreaded with cheap synthetic rubber to used-car lots.

One of Gilin's retreads blows out and causes the death of Mary's brother. Bill and his co-workers become determined to find the culprit behind the shoddy tires. Gilin worries that his scheme will be discovered after Bill traces a tire to his lot.

Nikki is pressured by Gilin to make herself available to Bill in a friendly manner, in order to find out what he knows and what his plans might be. Nikki does meet with Bill, but pretends to Gilin that she could not reach him; she then secretly warns Mary about the gangster. Bill goes to see Nikki, intending to collect information from her about the entire tire scam, and falls into Gilin's trap.

Gilin knocks Bill out and plans to kill him. Tom, who is back visiting on leave from the army, refuses to help his old boss when he learns that Gilin is a war profiteer. Gilin shoots Tom and escapes with Nikki to his warehouse. Tom manages to stay alive long enough to tell a recovered Bill what has happened. Bill calls his co-workers and the police, and they raid the warehouse en masse. During the fight, Gilin is shot by one of his own men, who is appalled that Gilin would kill Tom, a soldier.

Nikki and Mary both land jobs at the armaments factory with Bill.

== Cast ==
- Ricardo Cortez as Gilin
- Rochelle Hudson as Nikki
- William Henry as Bill Barry
- Barbara Read as Mary Dale
- John Abbott as Dumbo
- Dick Rich as Mule
- Dewey Robinson as Larkin
- Sam Edwards as Freddy Dale
- Kam Tong as Tom
- Milburn Stone as Angel
- Pat Gleason as Curley
- Alex Callam as Butch
- Alan Hale Jr. as Red
- Dick Hogan as Bert
- Marjorie Manners as Lila

== Production ==
The film was originally called Hot Rubber. 20th Century Fox wanted to make a film with the same title. The case was put before the Association of Motion Picture Producers who ruled that whoever started the film first could use the title. Universal also announced plans to make a film on the same topic with Destiny.

Filming started in May. That month the filmmakers changed their title to Rubber Racketeers in May 1942.

== Release ==
The Los Angeles Times said the film "drags somewhat in establishing the plot but reaches a striking climax of the melodramatic order."
