= The Talk of the Town (1942 film) =

1942 film by George Stevens

- theatrical poster
- Directed by: George Stevens
- Screenplay by: Irwin Shaw; Sidney Buchman
- Adaptation by: Dale Van Every
- Story by: Sidney Harmon
- Produced by: George Stevens
- Starring: Cary Grant; Jean Arthur; Ronald Colman
- Cinematography: Ted Tetzlaff
- Edited by: Otto Meyer
- Music by: Friedrich Hollaender
- Production company: Columbia Pictures
- Distributed by: Columbia Pictures
- Release date: August 20, 1942 (United States)
- Running time: 117 minutes
- Country: United States
- Language: English
- Budget: $1 million
- Box office: $1.1 million (US rentals)

The Talk of the Town is a 1942 American comedy-drama film directed by George Stevens and starring Cary Grant, Jean Arthur, and Ronald Colman, with a supporting cast featuring Edgar Buchanan and Glenda Farrell. The screenplay was written by Irwin Shaw and Sidney Buchman (and an adaptation by Dale Van Every) from a story by Sidney Harmon. The film was released by Columbia Pictures, and was the second time that Grant and Arthur were paired in a film, after Only Angels Have Wings (1939).

== Plot ==
Mill worker and political activist Leopold Dilg is accused of arson and murder, setting fire to a woolen mill, killing the mill foreman, Clyde Bracken. In the middle of the trial, Dilg escapes from jail and seeks shelter in a remote cottage owned by former schoolmate Nora Shelley, on whom he has had a crush for years. Shelley, now a schoolteacher, has rented the unoccupied cottage for the summer to distinguished law professor Michael Lightcap, who plans to use this secluded location to write a book. Both Lightcap and Dilg arrive within minutes of each other, so Shelley decides to hide Dilg in the attic.

When Dilg is spotted by Lightcap, Shelley passes him off as her gardener, Joseph. A visitor suddenly arrives, Senator Boyd. The senator informs Lightcap that he is about to be nominated to the Supreme Court by the president. Meanwhile, Lightcap and Dilg enjoy having spirited discussions about the law, Lightcap arguing from an academic viewpoint, with Dilg subscribing to a more practical approach. As a result of their spirited debates, they become good friends, but also romantic rivals, as Lightcap falls in love with Nora.

As a result of prodding by Shelley and Dilg's lawyer, Lightcap becomes suspicious of mill owner Andrew Holmes, foreman Clyde Bracken and Regina Bush. In spite of his initial reluctance, Lightcap starts to investigate the charges against Dilg. As a ruse, he romances Bush, the girlfriend of the supposed murder victim and discovers that foreman Bracken is still alive and hiding in Boston. Shelley, Lightcap and Dilg go to Boston and find him. They bring him back to Lochester and get him to admit his guilt and that of the mill owner for setting the fire.

While the three argue about whether to call the police, Bracken catches them unawares, knocks them unconscious and escapes. Dilg is held for trial while the town's anger at him is stoked into a riotous mob. Lightcap takes a gun from the cottage and seeks out the foreman, forcing him at gunpoint to go to the courthouse just as the mob is about to break in to lynch Dilg.

Firing the revolver to draw attention, Lightcap announces that the supposedly dead foreman is now present. He then gives an impassioned speech to the mob about the importance of the law, both in principle and in practice. In due course, the foreman and owner of the mill are indicted and Dilg is set free.

Soon afterwards Lightcap is appointed to the Supreme Court. Shelley visits him in his chambers and he tells her that his dream of 20 years has been realized. With more happiness than a man could want, he says the only thing left is to see his friends likewise happy, and suggests that Shelley should marry Dilg.

While both Dilg and Shelley are attending court at the first seating of Lightcap as an Associate Justice, Dilg interprets an affectionate look shared between Lightcap and Shelley as a sign that she has chosen to marry Lightcap, and leaves the courtroom abruptly. Shelley follows him, and Dilg eventually realises that she has chosen him.

== Cast ==
- Cary Grant as Leopold Dilg/Joseph
- Jean Arthur as Miss Nora Shelley
- Ronald Colman as Professor Michael Lightcap
- Edgar Buchanan as defense lawyer Sam Yates
- Glenda Farrell as Regina Bush
- Charles Dingle as Andrew Holmes
- Clyde Fillmore as Senator Boyd
- Emma Dunn as Mrs. Shelley
- Rex Ingram as Tilney
- Leonid Kinskey as Jan Pulaski
- Tom Tyler as Clyde Bracken
- Don Beddoe as Police Chief
- Leslie Brooks as Secretary (uncredited)
- Lloyd Bridges as news reporter, Donald Forrester (uncredited)
- Mabel Todd as beautician (uncredited)

== Production ==
The Talk of the Town began with the working title Mr. Twilight, but Cary Grant insisted it be changed. He suspected that, if the film appeared to be about a single male character, Ronald Colman, who had the better role, would steal the show. The title The Talk of the Town was registered to Universal Studios, and Columbia had to relinquish the rights to use Sin Town in return. Other titles considered for the film included Three's a Crowd, The Gentlemen Misbehave, Justice Winks an Eye, In Love with You, You're Wonderful, A Local Affair, The Woman's Touch, Morning for Angels, Scandal in Lochester, The Lochester Affair, and even Nothing Ever Happens.

While Grant was paid $106,250 for The Talk of the Town and Colman $100,000, Jean Arthur earned only $50,000, partly as a result of an ongoing conflict with Columbia Pictures president Harry Cohn.

Principal photography was originally scheduled to begin on January 17, 1942, but was delayed after Carole Lombard had been killed in a plane crash while selling war bonds in the Midwest. Stevens, who had directed Lombard in the 1940 film Vigil in the Night, halted filming that day and sent the cast and crew home.

The role of Colman's valet, played by Rex Ingram, was at the time a rare example of a non-stereotypical part for an African-American actor. Also unusual was the presence of two leading men: at this point in their careers both Grant and Colman had been used to having that role all to themselves. The situation is reflected in the plot, since audiences are kept guessing until the end who Arthur's character would choose to marry. Stevens filmed both versions, but left it to test audiences to determine their preferred ending.

Stevens and Arthur, both known for their perfectionism and attention to detail, enjoyed a close working relationship on The Talk of the Town, with Arthur calling Stevens her "favorite director" and Stevens describing Arthur as "the finest actress he ever worked with". They reunited on The More the Merrier (1943) and Shane (1953) − for which Arthur came out of semi-retirement.

== Reception ==
Bosley Crowther of The New York Times wrote: "Irwin Shaw and Sidney Buchman wrote a smart and lively script for the film and George Stevens has directed it with the slyness of a first-rate comedy man." He further added "the essential purpose of this tale is to amuse with some devious dilemmas, and that it does right well".

Variety felt the film's "story at times tries too hard to follow the general formula of predecessors. Yet even in its more flighty, absurd episodes, the sense of comedy is always retained by director George Stevens. Transition from serious or melodramatic to the slap-happy and humorous sometimes is a bit awkward, but in the main it is solid escapist comedy."

Harrison's Reports wrote the "story is a grand combination of comedy and human interest, the sort that should appeal to all types of audiences [...] Most of the comedy is provoked by Miss Arthur's efforts to keep Grant's identity from Colman. Despite its length, the picture is consistently interesting. Credit George Stevens with a fine directorial job."

David Lardner of The New Yorker praised Jean Arthur's performance, writing she "is really all that's necessary, though. Besides being a nice little number, she is able to handle comedy without resorting to dementia, a rare gift in these lean cinematic times."

Time magazine felt the film's "pedagogic plot turns into hilarious comedy, largely through the expert energy of [actress] Arthur, the expert apathy of [actor] Grant, the expert wispiness of Old-Timer Colman."

Philip K. Scheuer of the Los Angeles Times felt The Talk of the Town was "a provocative picture, exciting and humorous by turn, with an inspirational lift remindful of that earlier Columbia triumph, Mr. Smith Goes to Washington."

Kate Cameron of the New York Daily News applauded the three leads, but felt "the storytellers and George Stevens seem to have had difficulty making up their minds as to whether Leopold Dilg's adventure in trying to save his neck is serious drama or light comedy. It is, as a matter of fact, something of both, but the two main ingredients of the story are so inexpertly blended that they fail to make the plot jell as it should."

Ciara Moloney praised the film in Current Affairs for its character throuple and its political message, saying that "political debate functions as a kind of love language between the characters."

On the review aggregator website Rotten Tomatoes, 89% of 18 critics' reviews are positive.

=== Academy Award nominations ===
Award	Category	Nominee(s)	Result	Ref.
Academy Awards	Outstanding Motion Picture	George Stevens	Nominated	
Academy Awards	Best Writing (Original Motion Picture Story)	Sidney Harmon	Nominated	
Academy Awards	Best Writing (Screenplay)	Irwin Shaw, Sidney Buchman	Nominated	
Academy Awards	Best Art Direction (Black-and-White)	Art Direction: Lionel Banks, Rudolph Sternad; Interior Decoration: Fay Babcock	Nominated	
Academy Awards	Best Cinematography (Black-and-White)	Ted Tetzlaff	Nominated	
Academy Awards	Best Film Editing	Otto Meyer	Nominated	
Academy Awards	Best Music (Music Score of a Dramatic or Comedy Picture)	Frederick Hollander, Morris Stoloff	Nominated	

== See also ==
- Supreme Court of the United States in fiction
