= Rocky King Detective =

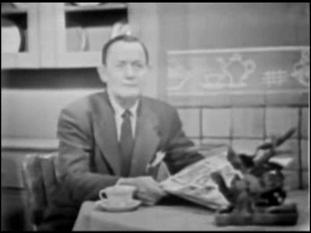
- Roscoe Karns as Rocky King
- Also known as: Inside Detective
- Genre: Action; Crime drama Police procedural
- Starring: Roscoe Karns; Earl Hammond; Todd Karns; Grace Carney
- Music by: Jack Ward
- Country of origin: United States
- No. of seasons: 6

Production
- Producer: Wilbur Stark
- Production company: Stark-Layton Production

Original release
- Network: DuMont Television Network
- Release: January 7, 1950 – December 26, 1954

Rocky King Detective (also known as Inside Detective) is an American action/crime drama series that was broadcast live on the DuMont Television Network on Sundays at 9pm ET for most of its run. The series ran for six seasons, from January 7, 1950, to December 26, 1954. From January 7, 1950, to July 22, 1950, the series was broadcast on Saturdays at 8:30pm ET, and from September 8, 1950, to March 9, 1951, it was broadcast on Fridays at 9:30pm ET, until moving to Sundays.

When the series began in 1950 it was seen on nine DuMont stations, and budget limitations forced its star, Roscoe Karns to change in the men's restroom. In 1953 it was shown on 45 stations and, after moving production to DuMont's new Tele-Center, Karns obtained his own dressing room. The series became one of DuMont's most popular shows, lasting nearly to the end of DuMont's operations.

== Overview ==
Each episode begins with Roscoe Karns, as the title character, walking down a long hallway towards the camera, as the announcer says “Rocky King, chief of homicide of the Metropolitan Police Force in an exciting fight against crime.” During the first three seasons Earl Hammond portrayed King's partner, Detective Sgt. Lane. During the final two seasons, Karns' real life son Todd portrayed King's partner Detective Hart. Rounding out the cast was Grace Carney as Mabel King.

As an economy measure Carney was heard, but never seen, as the wife of Detective King. DuMont always suffered from limited funds, and in an early episode Carney was asked to play both the detective's wife and a woman connected to the crime being investigated. Since the thirty-minute series was broadcast live there wasn't time for Carney to change her clothing and make-up, so she spoke her Mabel lines offscreen. The audience enjoyed the novelty of a character that was never seen, and so Carney continued to speak her lines out of camera range.

The series tried to show an accurate depiction of police work. Detective King and his assistants sometimes missed clues, or failed to arrest suspects in a timely manner, but the audience appreciated that the characters were depicted as being fallible. Roscoe Karnes had met a few detectives, and tried to model his role after them. He stated “The cops I’ve met like Rocky because the show doesn’t ridicule them.”

The series blended dramatic police investigation with humorous banter between Rocky and his wife Mabel; banter which often pertained to their son, Junior. Mabel said foolish things, and nagged her husband, but it was shown that the couple cared for each other. Each episode ended with Rocky calling his wife to say he would soon be home, then he looked at the camera and remarked “Wonderful girl, that Mabel.” Roscoe Karns wrote much of the dialogue between Rocky and Mabel.

== Episode status ==
Of hundreds of Rocky King Detective episodes 38 kinescope copies are archived at the UCLA Film and Television Archive, but 11 of those episodes are marked as being Non-circulating Safety Storage (archival or research) copies.

In 2006 Alpha Home Entertainment released a four-episode Rocky King Detective DVD. Several episodes are available for online viewing. Below is information about the most readily accessible episodes.

== Selected episodes ==
No.	Title	Directed by	Written by	Original release date
1	"Murder Scores a Knockout"	Lee Polk	Carl Abrams	13 July 1952
Magician Lionel the Great is poisoned in an actor’s boarding house. His room is ransacked, but his cash-filled wallet is left untouched. Detective King's son may be working for a bookie.
2	"The Hermit’s Cat"	Wesley Kenney	Carl Abrams	31 August 1952
A millionaire recluse never leaves his mansion, but his body is discovered on the highway, an apparent victim of a hit and run accident.
3	"One Minute For Murder"	Wesley Kenney	Carl Abrams	28 September 1952
Gossip columnist Art Paulson is blackmailing actress Nora Wade. On opening night of Nora’s new play Art is shot in her dressing room. Detective Lane solves the crime while Detective King is away.
4	"Death Has Dark Hands"	Wesley Kenney	Bob Corcoran	19 October 1952
A famous chemist is murdered and his secretary, his assistant, and a visitor all have secrets they want to keep hidden. A police chemist believes a powder may help solve the crime.
5	"Murder Ph. D."	Wesley Kenney	Frank Phares	26 October 1952
A man will be electrocuted at midnight for the murder of his wife’s psychiatrist. Hours before the execution Detective King receives a phone call from a man who claims to be the real murderer.
6	"Murder In Advance"	Wesley Kenney	Cy Charmak and Fran Carroll	7 March 1954
An author of mystery stories attends a party at his publisher’s house, and vows to tell how he became successful. Later that night he is murdered.
7	"Return For Death"	Wesley Kenney	Ed Morris	23 May 1954
A cemetery watchman finds a murdered man in a family mausoleum. Jack Klugman plays wanted bank robber Frank Garrison.
8	"In the Bag"	Wesley Kenney	Phillip S. Goodman	1 August 1954
A hospital patient, who is searching for his estranged wife, dies of poisoning. His nurse declares the man’s traveling bag was filled with money.

== See also ==
- List of programs broadcast by the DuMont Television Network
- List of surviving DuMont Television Network broadcasts
- 1951-52 United States network television schedule (Sundays at 9pm ET)
- 1952-53 United States network television schedule (Sundays at 9pm ET)
- 1953-54 United States network television schedule (Sundays at 9pm ET)
