= Lily Harmon =

American visual artist

- Born: Lillian Perelmutter; 1912; New Haven, Connecticut
- Died: February 11, 1998 (aged 85–86); New York City
- Education: Yale School of Fine Arts; Académie Colarossi; Art Students League of New York
- Known for: Portraitist and book illustrator
- Spouse(s): Philip Graham Harden; Sidney Harmon (m. 1934; div. 1940); Joseph H. Hirshhorn (m. 1947; div. 1956); Henry Rothman (m. 1960; div. 1960); Milton Schachter (m. 1972-1996, his death)

Lily Harmon (born Lillian Perelmutter; 1912–1998) was an American visual artist. She studied at the Yale School of Fine Arts in New Haven, and then went on to the Académie Colarossi in Paris, and lastly at the Art Students League of New York.

While studying in Paris, she would often get up at 6:30 in the morning, take the bus around town, and sketch people doing their daily work. She also studied textile design where she learned a lot about abstract lines, and color.

Harmon illustrated books in the period 1945–1976, including by such authors as Franz Kafka, Andre Gide, Jean-Paul Sartre, Thomas Mann, and Edith Wharton.

Harmon was the subject of a 50-year retrospective exhibition in 1982 which was organized by the Wichita Art Museum in Kansas and later traveled to the Provincetown Art Association and the Butler Institute of American Art. Her first solo gallery show took place at Associated American Artists in 1994, in New York. Since then her works have been exhibited at the Metropolitan Museum of Art, the Whitney Museum of American Art, the Fine Arts Museums of San Francisco, etc.

Harmon was a member of the Artists Equity Association, the Provincetown Art Association, and the National Academy of Design. Later in her life, she was a professor for painting at the National Academy of Design from 1974 until her retirement. She published an autobiography, Freehand, in 1981 (Simon & Schuster).

== Personal life ==
Harmon had five marriages, including to producer/screenwriter Sidney Harmon (married 1934–1940) and financier/art collector Joseph H. Hirshhorn (married 1947–1956). With Hirshhorn, she adopted two daughters, named Amy and Jo Ann.
