= Hans Jacoby =

German screenwriter (1904–1963)

- Born: 23 October 1904; Breslau, Silesia; German Empire
- Died: 31 October 1963 (aged 59); Zurich, Switzerland
- Occupation: Screenwriter
- Years active: 1921-1963

Hans Jacoby (1904–1963) was a German screenwriter. Jacoby was of Jewish background and was forced to go into exile when the Nazi Party took power in 1933. Jacoby settled in the United States for many years, working on the screenplays of a number of Hollywood productions. He returned to Germany in the mid-1950s, and worked in the West German film industry until his death.

== Selected filmography ==
=== Screenwriter ===
- Mademoiselle Josette, My Woman (1926)
- The Land of Smiles (1930)
- There Goes Susie (1934)
- I Was an Adventuress (1938)
- Gibraltar (1938)
- I Was an Adventuress (1938)
- Princess Tarakanova (1938)
- There's No Tomorrow (1939)
- Night in December (1940)
- I Was an Adventuress (1940)
- Between Us Girls (1942)
- The Amazing Mrs. Holliday (1943)
- Phantom of the Opera (1943)
- Tars and Spars (1946)
- Champagne for Caesar (1950)
- Tarzan and the Slave Girl (1950)
- Sirocco (1951)
- Reunion in Reno (1951)
- Tarzan's Savage Fury (1952)
- Taxi (1953)
- Carnival Story (1954)
- Circus of Love (1954)
- Ten on Every Finger (1954)
- Portrait of an Unknown Woman (1954)
- Stranger from Venus (1954)
- Vater sein dagegen sehr (1957)
- The Mad Bomberg (1957)
- Eva (1958)
- It Happened in Broad Daylight (1958)
- Heart Without Mercy (1958)
- The Man Who Walked Through the Wall (1959)
- Menschen im Hotel (1959)
- Das schwarze Schaf (1960)
- The Good Soldier Schweik (1960)
- The Juvenile Judge (1960)
- The Liar (1961)
- Street of Temptation (1962)
- Max the Pickpocket (1962)
- Axel Munthe, The Doctor of San Michele (1962)
- A Nearly Decent Girl (1963)

== Bibliography ==
- Prawer, S.S. Between Two Worlds: The Jewish Presence in German and Austrian Film, 1910–1933. Berghahn Books, 2005.
