= Hollister Noble =

American novelist

- Born: September 2, 1901
- Died: July 20, 1954 (aged 52)
- Occupation: American writer

Charles Hollister Noble (September 2, 1901 – July 20, 1954) was an American historical novelist and screenwriter. He committed suicide after it was alleged that he had plagiarized the research (not the text) of a book he had written. The decision that he was not guilty of plagiarism came only after his death by gunshot in the cellar of his home in Sherman Oaks, California.

== Career ==
Noble attended the Loomis School in Windsor, Connecticut, where he served on the first editorial board of the Loomis Log, Loomis's school newspaper. Noble was a professional writer and editor in the newspaper, radio and motion picture fields, with strong interests in the American Civil War and railroads. From 1931 he had written numerous book reviews for The New York Times and had been the author of numerous magazine articles published by The New York Times Magazine. Noble owned a substantial Civil War library and had served as an Army officer with the Office of War Information during World War II.

Three of Noble's stories were the basis for full-length cinema movies: Drums in the Deep South (1951), Mara Maru (1952), and Mutiny (1952).

Hollister Noble and his wife, Iris Noble, were represented by Barthold Fles.

== Books ==
- The Winds of Love (1948)
- Woman With a Sword: The biographical novel of Anna Ella Carroll of Maryland (1948)
- One Way to Eldorado (1954)
