= Franc Joubin =

Canadian geologist (1911–1997)

- Born: 15 November 1911; San Francisco, California
- Died: 21 February 1997 (aged 85); Toronto, Ontario
- Education: University of British Columbia (BSc '36, MSc '42)
- Spouse: Mary Toine Torvinen (m. 1937)

Francis Guy Renault "Franc" Joubin CM OOnt (15 November 1911 – 21 February 1997) was a Canadian prospector and geologist best known for a huge uranium discovery in northeastern Ontario, Canada in 1953.

== Biography ==
Born in San Francisco, California to parents of French descent, his family emigrated to Canada when he was three years old.

A graduate of the University of British Columbia, (Masters, Geology (1942)), Joubin worked independently as a consultant and prospector/geologist for various mining promoters and exploration companies.

In 1953, as an employee and eventual partner of promoter Joseph Hirshhorn, he persuaded his partner to finance diamond drilling of a previously dismissed area of surface radioactivity near Blind River, Ontario. Joubin's insight, with help from Dr. Charles Davidson, a leading British geologist, was that the presence of iron sulphide had leached the uranium mineral to a location deeper in the ground. Drilling results confirmed this and implied uranium deposits along a huge ninety mile Z-shaped geological formation extending north of the area. Known as the "Big Z" deposit, it became the hub of a frenzy of uranium exploration and mining activity. The town of Elliot Lake, (incorporated 1955) was built from scratch to house employees of the various mines that sprung up in the area. By 1955, Joubin and Hirshhorn sold their interests to Rio Tinto of Great Britain and divided paper profits of $35 million. By the 1980s it was estimated Joubin's discovery and the subsequent mineral production had added up to $30 billion to the Canadian economy.

Joubin resumed his career as a consulting geologist. He travelled much of the world for Rio Tinto, other companies, and eventually the United Nations.

He was made a member of the Order of Canada in 1983.

== Works ==
- Joubin, Franc. Not for Gold Alone. Deljay Publications, 1986.
