= Gun Crazy =

1950 film by Joseph H. Lewis

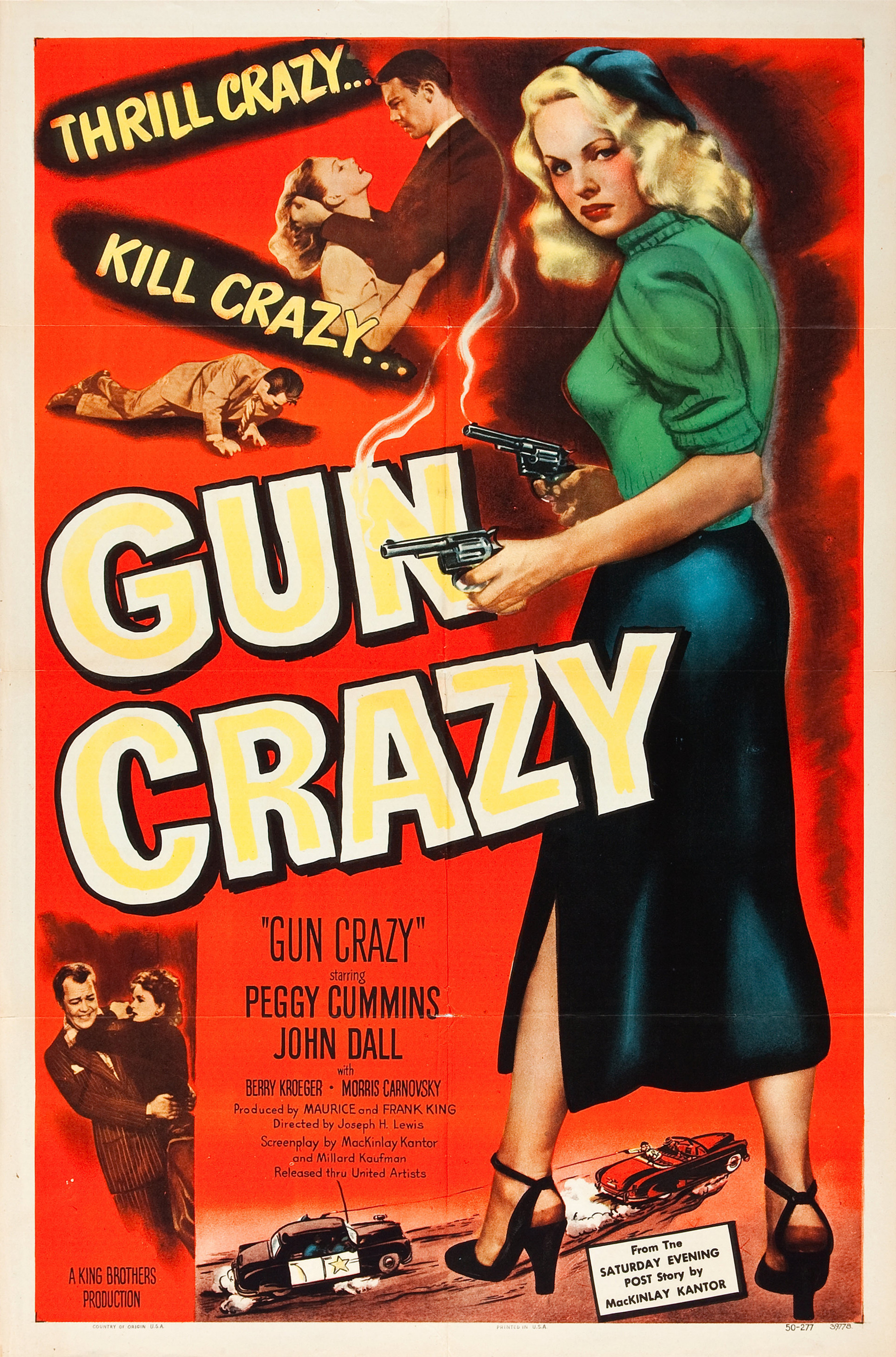
- Theatrical release poster
- Directed by: Joseph H. Lewis
- Screenplay by: Dalton Trumbo; MacKinlay Kantor
- Based on: "Gun Crazy"; 1940 story in The Saturday Evening Post by MacKinlay Kantor
- Produced by: Frank King; Maurice King
- Starring: Peggy Cummins; John Dall
- Cinematography: Russell Harlan
- Edited by: Harry Gerstad
- Music by: Victor Young
- Production company: King Brothers Productions
- Distributed by: United Artists
- Release date: January 20, 1950 (United States)
- Running time: 87 minutes
- Country: United States
- Language: English
- Budget: $400,000 (1949)

Gun Crazy (originally titled Deadly Is the Female) is a 1950 American crime film noir starring Peggy Cummins and John Dall in a story about the crime spree of a gun-toting husband and wife. It was directed by Joseph H. Lewis and produced by Frank and Maurice King. The screenplay by blacklisted writer Dalton Trumbo (credited to the pseudonym of Millard Kaufman) and MacKinlay Kantor was based upon a short story written by Kantor that was published in 1940 in The Saturday Evening Post.

Gun Crazy is a rare example of a film that was retitled during its initial release cycle. It was titled Deadly Is the Female from the film's premiere in January 1950 until March 1950, when the King brothers changed the title to Gun Crazy to more accurately reflect the character of the film.

In 1998, Gun Crazy was selected for preservation in the United States National Film Registry by the Library of Congress as being "culturally, historically, or aesthetically significant".

== Plot ==
Teenager Barton "Bart" Tare is caught breaking a hardware-store window to steal a gun. He is sent to reform school for four years despite the supportive testimony of his friends Dave and Clyde, his older sister Ruby and others. They claim that he would never kill any living creature, even though he has had a lifelong fascination with guns. After killing a young chick with a BB gun at age seven, he became hesitant to shoot at anything living, even a mountain lion with a bounty on its head.

After reform school and a stint in the army teaching marksmanship, Bart returns home. At a carnival, Bart challenges sharpshooter Laurie Starr to a contest and wins. Laurie arranges a job for Bart with the carnival and he becomes smitten with her. Their mutual attraction inflames the jealousy of their boss Packett, who wants Laurie for himself. When Packett tries to force himself on her, Bart fires a warning shot within an inch of his nose. Packett fires them and they leave together. Before they marry, Laurie warns Bart that she is "bad, but will try to be good". They embark on a carefree honeymoon on Bart's savings, but when the money is spent, she warns Bart that because she wants the finer things in life, he must join her in a career of crime or she will leave him. They rob stores and gas stations, but their paltry proceeds do not last long.

While fleeing from the law, Laurie orders Bart to shoot at the pursuing police car. He shoots the tire of the police car, causing it to crash. Later that day at another robbery, Laurie intends to shoot and kill a grocer, but Bart stops her in time. They have now been identified in national newspapers as notorious robbers.

Bart proclaims that he wants to abandon his life of crime. Laurie persuades him to participate in one last large robbery so that they can flee the country and live in peace and comfort. They take jobs at a meat-processing plant and devise detailed plans. When they rob the payroll department, the office manager pulls the burglar alarm and Laurie shoots her dead. While fleeing the plant, Laurie also kills a security guard. Bart does not realize that both victims are dead, but he later learns about it in the newspaper. Laurie discloses that she had killed a man in St. Louis during one of their holdups. She claims that these murders happened because her fear renders her unable to think clearly in the heat of the moment.

To minimize the chance of being caught, Laurie and Bart separate, but they cannot bear to be away from each other. The FBI becomes involved in the pursuit, and Laurie and Bart become the targets of an intense manhunt. In California, Bart arranges for their passage to Mexico, but the FBI finds them in a dance hall. Forced to run, they leave all of their loot behind. With roadblocks everywhere, they jump on a train and disembark near Ruby's house. Clyde, now the local sheriff, notices that the house's curtains are drawn and that the children are not in school. He informs Dave, and they plead with Bart to surrender. Laurie and Bart instead flee to the mountains. Pursued by police dogs, they are surrounded in reed grass the next morning. In dense fog, Dave and Clyde approach to try to reason with them. When Bart sees that Laurie is preparing to shoot them, he shoots her and is then killed by the police.

== Cast ==
- Peggy Cummins as Annie Laurie Starr
- John Dall as Barton "Bart" Tare
- Berry Kroeger as Packett
- Morris Carnovsky as Judge Willoughby
- Anabel Shaw as Ruby Tare Flagler
- Harry Lewis as Deputy Clyde Boston
- Nedrick Young as Dave Allister
- Trevor Bardette as Sheriff Boston
- Mickey Little as Bart Tare at age 7
- Russ Tamblyn as Bart Tare at age 14 (billed as Rusty Tamblyn)
- Paul Frison as Clyde Boston at age 14
- David Bair as Dave Allister at age 7
- Stanley Prager as Bluey-Bluey
- Virginia Farmer as Miss Wynn
- Anne O'Neal as Miss Augustine Sifert
- Frances Irvin as Danceland singer
- Robert Osterloh as Hampton Policeman
- Shimen Ruskin as Cab Driver
- Harry Hayden as Mr. Mallenberg

== Production ==
The screenplay was credited to Kantor and Millard Kaufman; however, Kaufman was a front for Hollywood Ten outcast Dalton Trumbo, who considerably reworked the story into a doomed love affair.

The King brothers originally announced that they had wanted Veronica Lake for the lead.

The film was budgeted at $400,000, and principal photography took 30 days. It was originally slated to be released by Monogram Studios, but King Brothers Productions chose United Artists as the distributor, affording the film wider exposure.

The bank-heist sequence was shot entirely in one long take in Montrose, California, with no one except the principal actors and people inside the bank alerted to the operation. The shot includes the sequence of driving into town to the bank, distracting and then incapacitating a patrolman and effecting a getaway. This was executed by simulating the interior of a sedan with a stretch Cadillac with room to mount the camera and a jockey's saddle for the cameraman on a greased two-by-twelve board in the back. Lewis kept the onscreen conversations fresh by having the actors improvise their dialogue.

== Release ==
The film premiered in Springfield, Massachusetts on January 23, 1950 under its original title of Deadly Is the Female. After opening in several cities under that title, the film was retitled as Gun Crazy, the title of the original story by MacKinlay Kantor, in early March.

== Reception ==
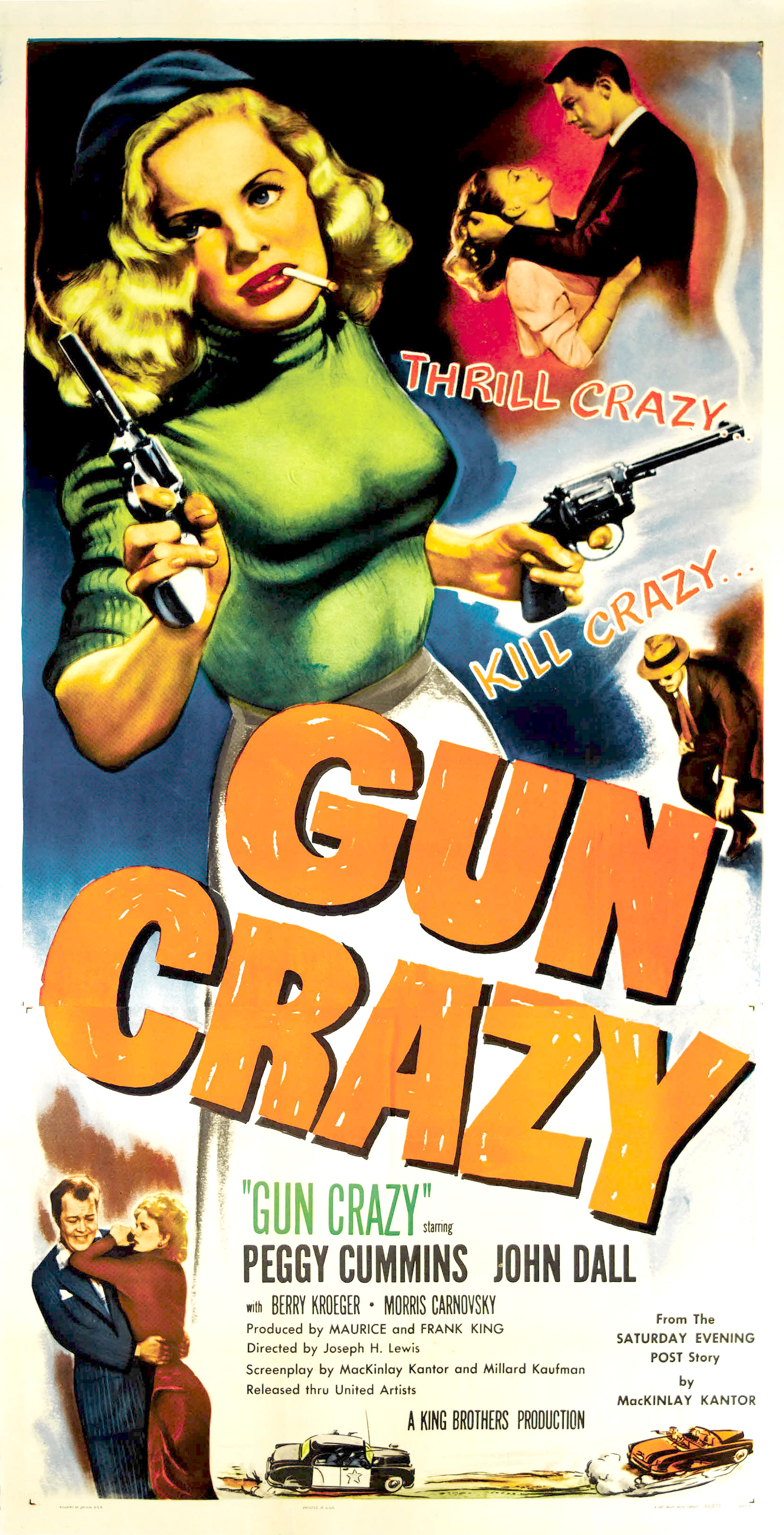
Alternate theatrical release poster

In a contemporary review for The New York Times, critic Howard Thompson called Gun Crazy "pretty cheap stuff" and wrote: "[T]his spurious concoction is basically on par with the most humdrum pulp fiction. ... The main drawbacks are the stars themselves, who look more like fugitives from a 4-H Club than from the law. Just why two such clean-cut youngsters as Miss Cummins and Mr. Dall should be so cast is something for the Sphinx, but they certainly give it the works. ... At the risk of being drilled between the eyes by one of these sureshots, we must say that it takes more than crime and the King Brothers to make sows’ ears out of silk purses."

Reviewing the film after its Springfield, Massachusetts premiere, Springfield Daily News critic W. Harley Rudkin wrote: "A tawdry piece of cheap theatrics that starts with a thin premise and winds up with absolutely nothing at all is 'Deadly Is the Female' ... Stripped down to its essentials, a revelation it cannot very well stand, this is a typical, warmed-over cops and robbers story, wrapped around the dubious moral that if you are a rather nice guy it does not do to get mixed up with a woman who likes to rob banks and kill guards."

Reviewer Mae Tinée of the Chicago Tribune wrote: "John Dall does fine acting in this crime melodrama, which is frequently better than many of the more elaborate and expensive films on the same subject. ... Miss Cummins struck me as a bit miscast as the hardened little sadist, but on the whole the performances are good, and if it does nothing else, this film should convince anyone that earning a living with a gun is certainly doing it the hard way."

In his 1998 book Dark City: The Lost World of Film Noir, critic and film historian Eddie Muller commended the production, writing: "Joseph H. Lewis's direction is propulsive, possessed of a confident, vigorous simplicity that all the frantic editing and visual pyrotechnics of the filmmaking progeny never quite surpassed."

On the review aggregator website Rotten Tomatoes, 91% of 66 critics' reviews are positive. The website's consensus reads: "Well-acted and strikingly filmed, Gun Crazy (Deadly Is the Female) delves into the darkness of human nature with noir-fueled B-movie flair."

== See also ==
- List of cult films
