= Heaven with a Gun =

1969 film by Lee H. Katzin

- Theatrical release poster
- Directed by: Lee H. Katzin
- Screenplay by: Richard Carr
- Produced by: Frank King; Maurice King
- Starring: Glenn Ford; Carolyn Jones; Barbara Hershey; John Anderson; David Carradine; Noah Beery Jr. J.D. Cannon
- Cinematography: Fred J. Koenekamp
- Edited by: Dann Cahn
- Music by: Johnny Mandel
- Production company: King Brothers Productions
- Distributed by: Metro-Goldwyn-Mayer
- Release date: June 11, 1969 (United States)
- Running time: 101 minutes
- Country: United States
- Language: English

Heaven with a Gun is a 1969 American Western film starring Glenn Ford and directed by Lee H. Katzin.

== Plot ==
Jim Killian arrives at the town of Vinegaroon, which is divided between cattlemen and sheepherders, and purchases a vacant barn. Cattle rancher Asa Beck, his son Coke, and his cowhands constantly harass the sheepherders, sometimes with lethal results, and the sheepherders are on the verge of retaliating in kind. Both parties quickly learn that Killian is a capable gunfighter and offer to hire him, but Killian invites them all to the town for a meeting. There, Killian reveals he has become a preacher and converted his barn into a church. He vows to the townspeople that he will protect everyone who lives in the vicinity, and warns that no one else is permitted to kill except him; when two of Beck's cowhands draw their guns to attack Killian, Killian shoots them both to prove his point.

The following Sunday, everyone in Vinegaroon and its surroundings attends Killian's church service. Killian demonstrates that, contrary to Beck's beliefs, cattle and sheep can be kept together and share the local water sources without detriment to either animal, and argues that this is no different than how people of all kinds can live together in harmony. However, Beck pegged Killian as a threat before the service and hired an outsider called Mace. When the service ends, Mace publicly exposes Killian as a former criminal associate and a convicted murderer. Beck and his allies call for Killian's expulsion from the town, but others come to the preacher's defense, asserting he had already paid his debt to society in prison and he has earned a second chance. Bart Paterson, a cattleman, and Abraham Murdock, a sheepherder, decide to follow Killian's advice and make peace with each other.

Meanwhile, Killian has taken under his protection a half-Native American girl named Leloopa, whose father had been lynched by Coke Beck. Coke develops a fascination with the girl. While Killian is discussing the Becks' recent razing of sheepherder Scotty Andrews' homestead with Madge McCloud, the madam of the local saloon and brothel, Coke corners Leloopa in the town stables and rapes her. When Killian realizes what happened, he gives Coke a severe beating in full view of the town.

In response, Asa Beck begins moving his cattle herd to the contested watering hole with intent to occupy the area and permanently shut out the sheepherders. In the night, Scotty Andrews sneaks into their camp and manages to stab Coke to death through the neck with his wool shears before being gunned down by Mace. A grieving Beck declares war against anyone in Vinegaroon who does not follow him. He orders Mace to burn down Killian's church and kill the preacher, then prepares to ambush the sheepherders, who are driving their herds to the watering hole alongside Murdock and Paterson to defy Beck's blockade. Mace holds Killian at gunpoint in the saloon while other cowhands set fire to the church, but Killian manages to outgun Mace and chase away his cohorts. The townspeople work together to douse the burning church, but to no avail.

An enraged Killian gears up to take revenge against Beck, but Madge intervenes and insists that he choose between being a preacher or a gunman once and for all, as his attempt to straddle the line between the two opposing roles has only undermined his efforts to bring about peace. Abashed, Killian discards his guns in the ashes of his church and then asks the people of Vinegaroon to help him protect the sheepherders from Beck. Although they have no weapons, the townspeople speed to the watering hole on every horse and cart available, and succeed in getting between Beck's men and the sheepherders just in time. Seeing their friends and families advance toward them unarmed, the cowhands falter and desert Beck. At last, Beck gives up and agrees to share a drink with Madge. Killian and Leloopa watch, satisfied, as the cattlemen and sheepherders walk among each other and shake hands.

== Cast ==
- Glenn Ford as Jim Killian
- Carolyn Jones as Madge McCloud
- Barbara Hershey as Leloopa
- John Anderson as Asa Beck
- David Carradine as Coke Beck
- J. D. Cannon as Mace
- Noah Beery, Jr. as Garvey
- William Bryant as Bart Paterson
- James Griffith as Abraham Murdock
- Ed Bakey as Scotty Andrews
- Barbara Babcock as Mrs. Andrews
- Virginia Gregg as Mrs. Patterson
- James Chandler as Doc Foster
- Angelique Pettyjohn as Emily the saloon girl

== Reception ==
=== Critical response ===
The New York Times film critic, Howard Thompson, gave the film a mixed review, writing, "The typical dour restraint of Glenn Ford, as an exconvict turned pistol-packing parson, is the most steadying ingredient of Heaven With a Gun, a plodding, vest-pocket Western that opened yesterday at neighborhood theaters. As a veteran of many a cattlemen-versus-sheepmen exercise, Mr. Ford plays it cool and, of course, leathery."

Leonard Maltin also had mixed feelings, awarding the film two and a half stars out of four and calling it "uneven."

Critic Dennis Schwartz gave the film a negative review, writing, "...[director] and writer Richard Carr load the genre pic with cliches and violent sequences. The unpleasant Western features a lynching, torture with shears, a rape, arson, a street brawl and your usual saloon gun fights. The numerous cliches include a world-weary gunfighter wanting to reform and to save the world, your typical western fight between cattlemen and sheepherders, an aging saloon keeper and whorehouse madam with a heart of gold (Carolyn Jones) longing for her unavailable old gunfighter friend and a pretty half-caste Indian (Barbara Hershey) finding it difficult to understand the white world. It preaches an awkward social conscience message that peace can be found without guns. The trouble is the pic is clumsily executed and is leaden, so everything seems absurd and hardly believable."

== See also ==
- List of American films of 1969
