= Iris Noble =

Canadian-American journalist and writer

Iris Noble (22 February 1922 in Calgary, Alberta – 30 June 1986 in Pátzcuaro, Mexico) was a Canadian-American journalist and a prolific writer of books, best known for writing biographies for teens.

Iris Noble was born as Iris Davis in Canada to parents from the US. At the age of 11 they moved to Oregon. Iris would obtain her bachelor's from the University of Oregon. At just 18 years old, in 1940, she married Hollister Noble, also a writer, with whom she later lived in New York City and California.

== Books ==
- Nellie Bly, first woman reporter, 1867-1922 (1956)
- Joseph Pulitzer: Front Page Pioneer (1957) OCLC 814250576
- Clarence Darrow Defense Attorney (1958)
- The Doctor Who Dared: William Osler (1959)
- The Courage of Dr. Lister (1960)
- Great Lady of the Theatre: Sarah Bernhardt (1960)
- William Shakespeare (1961)
- First Woman Ambulance Surgeon: Emily Barringer (1962)
- Egypt's Queen: Cleopatra (1963)
- Physician to the Children : Dr. Bela Schick (1963)
- Nurse Around the World: Alice Fitzgerald (1964)
- Megan (1965)
- Empress of All Russia: Catherine the Great (1966)
- Labor's advocate: Eugene V. Debs (1966)
- Courage in Her Hands (1967)
- Leonardo da Vinci: The Universal Genius (1968) ISBN 9780216884250
- Firebrand for Justice: A Biography of Louis Dembitz Brandeis (1969)
- Spain's Golden Isabella I of Castile|Queen Isabella (1969)
- The Honor of Balboa (1970)
- Emmeline Pankhurst|Emmeline and Her Daughters: The Pankhurst Suffragettes (1971)
- Master Surgeon: John Hunter (surgeon)|John Hunter (1971)
- Treasure of the Caves: The Story of the Dead Sea Scrolls (1971)
- Israel's Golda Meir: Pioneer to Prime Minister (1972)
- Cameras and Courage: Margaret Bourke-White (1973)
- Interpol, International Crime Fighter (1975)
- Susan B. Anthony (1975)
- Mahmud's Story: The Journal of a Palestinian Refugee (1976)
- Life on the Line: Alternative Approaches to Work (1977)
- Contemporary Women Scientists of America (1979)
- Nazi Hunter, Simon Wiesenthal (1979)
- Tingambato: Adventure in Archaeology (1983)
