= Circus of Love =

1954 German film by Kurt Neumann

- Directed by: Kurt Neumann
- Written by: Hans Jacoby; Kurt Neumann; Marcy Klauber; Charles Williams
- Starring: Eva Bartok; Curd Jürgens; Bernhard Wicki
- Cinematography: Ernest Haller
- Edited by: Ludolf Grisebach; Merrill G. White
- Music by: Willy Schmidt-Gentner
- Production companies: King Brothers Productions; Westia Film
- Distributed by: RKO Radio Pictures
- Release date: 19 June 1954
- Running time: 93 minutes
- Country: West Germany
- Language: German

Circus of Love (German: Rummelplatz der Liebe) is a 1954 drama film directed by Kurt Neumann and starring Eva Bartok, Curd Jürgens and Bernhard Wicki. It was made as a co-production between West Germany and the United States. It premiered at the Berlin International Film Festival.

The film was shot at the Bavaria Studios in Munich and on location in the city. The film's sets were designed by the art directors Hans Kuhnert and Theo Zwierski. It was produced by King Brothers and released in West Germany by RKO Pictures. A separate English-language version, Carnival Story, was shot simultaneously.

== Cast ==
- Eva Bartok as Lilli
- Curd Jürgens as Toni
- Bernhard Wicki as Franz
- Robert Freitag as Richard
- Willi Rose as Karl
- Ady Berber as Groppo the Wildman
- Helene Stanley as Lore
- Jacob Möslacher as The Dwarf
- Josef Schneider as The Sword-swallower
- Amalie Lindinger as The Fat Lady
- Ly Maria as The Snake Lady
- Anni Trautner as The Bearded Lady
- Jadin Wong as The Chinese Dancer

== Bibliography ==
- Hayes, R.M. 3-D Movies: A History and Filmography of Stereoscopic Cinema. McFarland, 1998.
