= Baker Museum =

Art museum in Naples, Florida, USA

Coordinates: 26.2158°N 81.8044°W

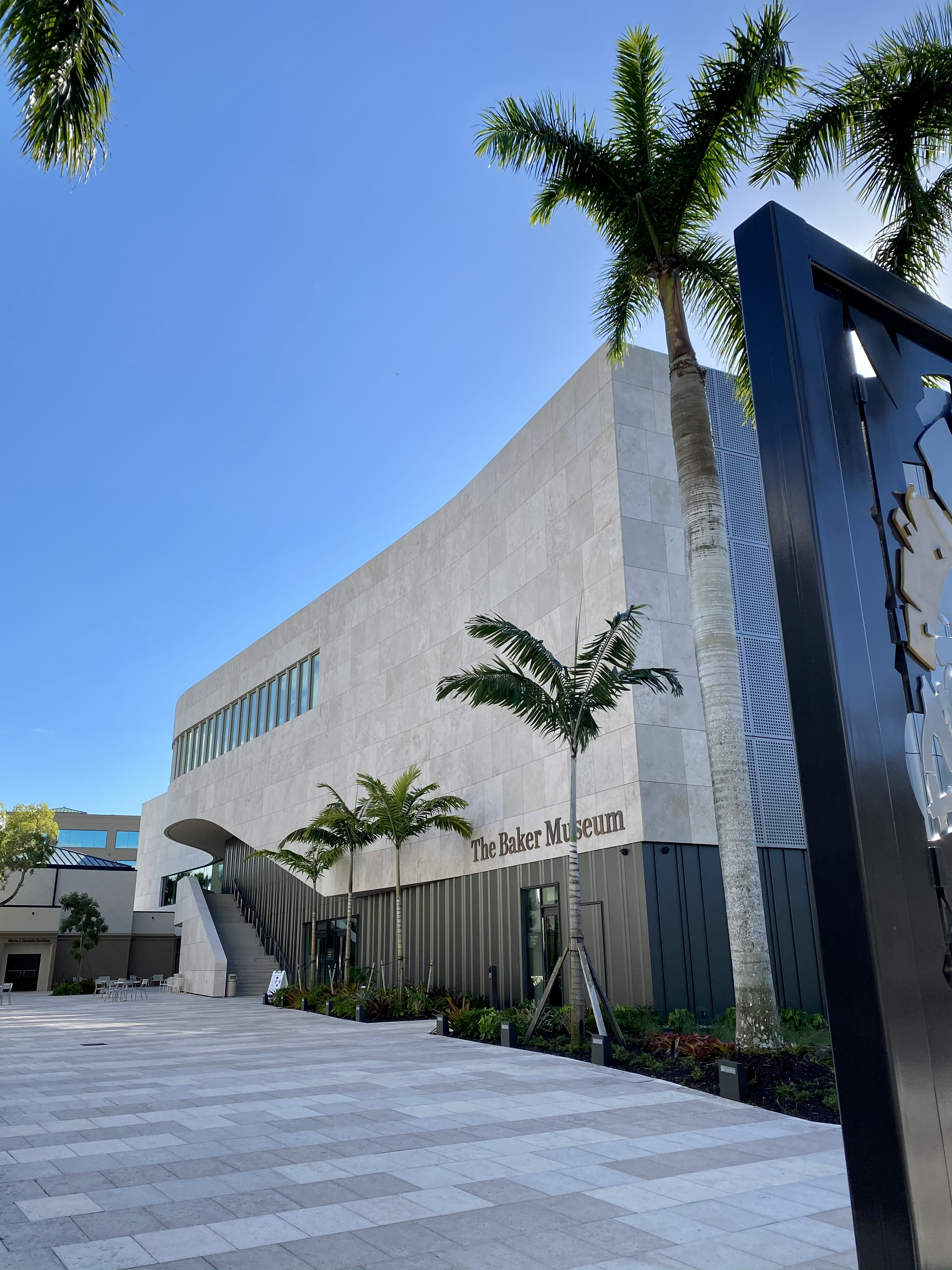
The Baker Museum in Naples, Florida, in 2020, after renovation and expansion

The Baker Museum (formerly the Naples Museum of Art) is part of Artis–Naples, a multidisciplinary organization that also is the home of the Naples Philharmonic, located at 5833 Pelican Bay Boulevard, Naples, Florida. The museum, opened in 2000 and later renamed for philanthropists Patty and Jay Baker, houses a diverse collection of art in a three-story, 30,000-square-foot (2,800 m^{2}) facility. The permanent collection includes works of American modernism, 20th-century Mexican art, sculpture and 3-dimensional art. In addition to the permanent collection, the museum hosts traveling exhibits throughout the year. The Baker Museum also houses the Sisters Reading Room, which contains the Saldukas Family Foundation library collection.

== Collection ==
The museum's permanent collection has over 3,500 objects of 20th- and 21st-century art, particularly American and Mexican modern art. The collection continues to grow through donations and purchases.

=== Ahmet Ertegun Collection ===
The museum acquired the Ahmet Ertegun Collection in 1999, which contains about 300 works of Modernist art from the 1910s through the 1960s. The collection has works by artists A. E. Gallatin, Morgan Russell, Marsden Hartley, Stanton Macdonald-Wright, Thomas Hart Benton, Helen Torr, and Stuart Davis.

=== Harry Pollak Collection ===
The museum acquired the Harry Pollak Collection in 2002, which contains works of Mexican art dated from 1900 to 1980. Artists include Leonora Carrington, Diego Rivera, José Clemente Orozco, Rufino Tamayo, [Guillermo Meza}Fernando Castillo} and David Alfaro Siqueiros.

=== Bryna Prensky Collection ===
The museum was gifted the Bryna Prensky Collection in 2007, which contains Mexican art from artists including Mario Rangel and Felipe Saúl Peña.

=== Olga Hirshhorn Collection ===
The Olga Hirshhorn Collection was acquired in 2013 and 2016, and contains a diverse collection of modern and contemporary art by artists such as Josef Albers, Alexander Calder, Georgia O'Keeffe, Man Ray, Willem de Kooning, Pablo Picasso, and Ed Ruscha.

=== Paul and Charlotte Corddry Collection ===
The Paul and Charlotte Corddry Collection was donated to the museum in 2016, and contains modern and contemporary art from American artists including Robert Motherwell, Roy Lichtenstein, Marilyn Minter, Larry Rivers, Ed Moses, Viola Frey, James Rosenquist, Pat Steir, Frank Stella, John Wesley, Ellsworth Kelly, and Robert Rauschenberg.

== Programming ==
The Baker Museum hosts events including exhibition lectures, workshops, Art After Hours, and Artists' Studio Tour to celebrate the visual arts and lifelong learning. Every last Wednesday of the month from 6pm to 9pm, visitors to the museum for Art After Hours get free admission.

== Building ==
The Baker Museum was designed by Florida architect Eugene Aubry and opened to the public in 2000. It closed for repairs from September 2017 to December 2019 due to water damage from Hurricane Irma. An expansion designed by Weiss/Manfredi was completed in 2020, adding 18,000 square feet (1,700 m^{2}) to display the museum's collection, host events, and create social gathering spaces.
