= Joseph Hirshhorn =

American businessman

Joseph Herman Hirshhorn
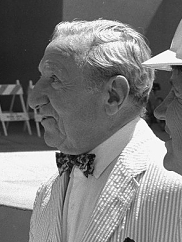
- Joseph Hirshhorn, 1978
- Born: August 11, 1899; Mitau, Latvia
- Died: August 31, 1981 (aged 82)
- Occupations: Entrepreneur, Financier, Art collector
- Spouse(s): Jennie Berman (m. 1922–div. c. 1941); Lily Harmon (m. 1945; div. 1956); Brenda Hawley Heide; Olga Hirshhorn (née Zatorsky) (m.1964–his death)
- Children: Robin Gertrude, Gene Harriet, Gordon, Naomi Caryl, Amy, Jo Ann

Joseph Herman Hirshhorn (August 11, 1899 – August 31, 1981) was an entrepreneur, financier, art collector, and philanthropist.

== Biography ==
Born in Mitau, Latvia, the twelfth of thirteen children, Hirshhorn emigrated to the United States with his widowed mother at the age of six. Hirshhorn is of Ashkenazi Jewish descent.

Hirshhorn went to work as an office boy on Wall Street at age 14. Three years later, in 1916, he became a stockbroker and earned $168,000 (equivalent to $4.97 million in 2025) that year. A shrewd investor, he sold off his Wall Street investments two months before the collapse of 1929, realizing $4 million (equivalent to $80 million in 2025) in cash. Hirshhorn made his fortune in the mining and oil businesses. In the 1930s, he focused much of his attention on gold and uranium mining prospects in Canada, establishing an office in Toronto in 1933.

In the 1950s, he and geologist Franc Joubin were primarily responsible for the "Big Z" uranium discovery in northeastern Ontario and the subsequent founding of the city of Elliot Lake. Hirshhorn Avenue, a residential street in that city, is named after him. By 1960, when he sold the last of his uranium stock, he had made over $100 million (equivalent to $1.1 billion in 2025) from the uranium business.

From 1961 to 1976, Hirshhorn lived in a three-story Norman chateau in a 22-acre (89,000 m^{2}) estate at the summit of Round Hill, a 550-foot (170 m) rise in north-central Greenwich, Connecticut, with a view of the Manhattan skyline.

== Art collecting ==
When Hirshhorn began to make money, he began to buy art, both paintings and sculpture. He amassed a collection of paintings and sculptures from the 19th and 20th centuries. Applying himself seriously to the study of art, he would question dealers, critics, and curators, and visit artists in their studios. He made quick decisions on buying a piece. "If you've got to look at a picture a dozen times before you make up your mind", he once said, "there's something wrong with you or the picture".

Hirshhorn graced his Greenwich mansion with paintings by Joseph Glasco (also sculpture), Willem de Kooning, Raphael Soyer, Jackson Pollock, Larry Rivers, and Thomas Eakins, and the grounds outside with sculptures by Auguste Rodin, Pablo Picasso, Henri Matisse, Alberto Giacometti, Alexander Calder, Richard Bernstein (artist), George Rickey, and Henry Moore. He allowed many nonprofit groups to use tours of his sculpture garden for fundraising.

Hirshhorn once walked away from purchasing a number of pieces in Los Angeles, because the Ferus Gallery would not offer the usual 10 percent discount. Later, while in negotiations to build the Hirshhorn Museum, Hirshhorn visited Ferus again, offering to buy all the works in a recent show by Ed Ruscha. The gallerist added 30 percent when calculating the total, and when Hirshhorn asked for a discount, a 30 percent discount was granted.

In 1966 Hirshhorn donated much of his collection, consisting of 6,000 paintings and sculptures from the 19th and 20th centuries (and constituting one of the world's largest private art treasures), to the United States government, along with a $2 million endowment (equivalent to $20 million in 2025). The Smithsonian Institution established the Joseph H. Hirshhorn Museum and Sculpture Garden in Washington, D.C., in 1966 to hold the collection; the museum opened in 1974. At Hirshhorn's death in 1981, he willed an additional 6,000 works and a $5 million endowment (equivalent to $18 million in 2025) to the museum.

== Controversy ==
His business dealings in Canada were not without controversy. He was investigated by the Ontario Securities Commission, convicted twice of breaking Canadian foreign exchange laws, deported from Canada for illegal stock manipulation (which he later appealed and won by having himself declared a landed immigrant), and fined for an illegal securities sale and illegally smuggling cash out of Canada.

== Personal life ==
Hirshhorn's first wife was Jennie Berman. They were married in 1922 and separated in 1941 (19 years). They had four children, daughters Robin Gertrude (b. 1923), Gene Harriet (b. 1926), and Naomi Caryl (b. 1931), and son Gordon (b. 1929). He was married to portraitist and book illustrator Lily Harmon from 1947–1956 (9 years). The couple adopted two daughters, Amy (b. 1948) and Jo Ann (b. 1951). Hirshhorn's third wife was Brenda Hawley Heide. In 1964 he married his fourth wife, Olga Zatorsky, remaining with her until his death in 1981.
