= Drums in the Deep South =

Film about the American Civil War

- Original film poster
- Directed by: William Cameron Menzies
- Written by: Philip Yordan; Sidney Harmon
- Based on: Woman With a Sword by Hollister Noble
- Produced by: Frank King (producer); Maurice King (producer)
- Starring: James Craig; Barbara Payton; Guy Madison; Barton MacLane
- Cinematography: Lionel Lindon
- Edited by: Richard V. Heermance
- Music by: Dimitri Tiomkin
- Production company: King Brothers Productions
- Distributed by: RKO Pictures
- Release date: October 16, 1951 (Atlanta)
- Running time: 87 minutes
- Country: United States
- Language: English
- Budget: $300,000

Drums in the Deep South is a 1951 American Civil War Western film shot in SuperCinecolor, directed by William Cameron Menzies and starring James Craig, Barbara Payton and Guy Madison. Based on a story written by Hollister Noble, the film was produced by the independent King Brothers Productions and released by RKO Pictures.

== Plot ==
Best friends Clay Clayburn and Will Denning graduate from West Point and visit their friend and fellow graduate Braxton Summers at his Georgia plantation in 1861. Clay is in love with Braxton's wife Kathy and has for many years. When war is declared, they soon find themselves fighting on opposite sides of the Civil War.

By 1864, Clay, now a field artillery major in the Confederate States Army, is renowned for accepting and surviving suicide missions. In order to delay General Sherman's March to the Sea, Clay is ordered to lead a party of men and their disassembled cannon inside caves that lead to the top of Devil's Mountain. From there, the plan is to employ a battery of guns to destroy a railroad and the Union troop and supply trains that travel it, buying time for the Confederacy. Devil's Mountain is near Braxton's old plantation, where Kathy remains with her uncle Albert while Braxton is fighting with another unit. Kathy agrees to monitor the activities of the Union troops and to signal Clay's men from her window through a mirror by day and a lantern by night. At one point, having been caught signaling to Clay by one of the Union soldiers, Albert mortally wounds him before being shot dead himself. Because of Kathy's actions, Clay's men are notified of the arrival of two supply trains and destroy both of them.

Will, now a major, arrives on the field, but the Union artillery cannot achieve the elevation or range with their cannon to clear the Confederate guns at the top of the mountain. Inside the mountain, the Union infantry cannot find the path to the top and are delayed by Confederate snipers, as the railroad line has been blocked by two destroyed trains, Union headquarters sends a Dahlgren gun manned by sailors and mounted on a flat car to defeat the Confederates. Kathy supplies Clay with wire from her piano to reinforce the barrel of one of his guns that, with a double charge and the maximum elevation, is able to destroy the naval gun and further block the railroad line.

Will has Union engineers mine the inside of the mountain with explosives that will destroy the mountain. However, Clay calculates that the explosion will send the cliff down over the railway line, further blocking the Union's supplies. Wills allow Kathy to act as a mediator to convince Clay and his men to surrender. As she traverses the caverns on the way to the top, Kathy is mistaken for a Union soldier and shot by one of Clay's soldiers. She repeats the Union offer of surrender as Clay nurses her wound. Ordering his men to escape Devil's Mountain.

Clay begins to carry Kathy down the mountain, but she dies in his arms before they reach the exit, causing him to abandon any further attempt to escape, laying her body down and declaring he'll never leave her again. Will reluctantly allows the fuses to be lit, with the resulting explosion blocking the line and seemingly entombing Clay and Cathy in the mountain together forever.

== Cast ==
- James Craig as Maj. Clay Clayburn
- Barbara Payton as Kathy Summers
- Guy Madison as Maj. Will Denning
- Barton MacLane as Sgt. Mac McCardle
- Robert Osterloh as Sgt. Harper
- Tom Fadden as Purdy
- Robert Easton as Jerry
- Louis Jean Heydt as Col. House
- Craig Stevens as Col. Braxton Summers
- Taylor Holmes as Albert Monroe
- Lewis Martin as Gen. Johnston
- Peter Brocco as Union corporal
- Dan White as Corp. Jennings

=== Uncredited ===
- Robert Clarke as Union officer
- Kenne Duncan as Union officer
- Roy Gordon as Lt. Col. Fitzgerald
- James Griffith as Union officer
- Myron Healey as Union lieutenant
- Todd Karns as Union captain
- Norman Leavitt as Confederate soldier
- Frank Marlowe as Confederate soldier
- Tom Monroe as Confederate soldier
- Billy Nelson as Union sergeant
- Steve Pendleton as Capt. Travis
- Denver Pyle as Union soldier
- Mickey Simpson as Jim Burns
- Ray Walker as Union officer
- Guy Wilkerson as Confederate sentry

== Production ==
Drums in the Deep South was the first film produced by King Brothers Productions that was financed through selling shares. A total of 300,000 shares worth $300,000 were issued to more than 700 investors. The film ultimately cost $450,000.

The film was shot at the Samuel Goldwyn Studio and on location in Sonora, California. The railroad scenes were filmed on the Sierra Railroad in Tuolumne County, California.

== Soundtrack ==
- "Dixie" (by Daniel Decatur Emmett)
- "Battle Hymn of the Republic" (by William Steffe)
- "Barbara Allen" (traditional)
- "Down by the Riverside"
- "The Old Gray Mare"

== Release ==
King Brothers Productions signed a distribution deal for Drums in the Deep South with RKO Pictures. King Brothers later sued RKO Pictures for mismanaging the distribution and sale of the film, claiming $10,000 in damages.

The film's world premiere was held at the Rialto Theater in Atlanta on October 16, 1951. The city organized a multiday event that included a beauty pageant featuring entrants from each of the 13 states of the Confederacy. The prize was a seven-year film contract with King Brothers Productions and a tour of the United States and Europe. The winner of the pageant, Barbara Bracewell of Memphis, toured Europe but did not pursue a career in Hollywood, choosing instead to marry and raise a family. Mayor William B. Hartsfield acted as host for the festivities, as he had done for all Atlanta premieres since that of Gone with the Wind in 1939.

== Reception ==
In a contemporary review for the Los Angeles Times, critic Philip K. Scheuer wrote: "The action saves 'Drums in the Deep South' and makes it a pretty fair little picture. Menzies' direction rates much higher in these scenes than in the more intimate sequences."

Reviewer Mildred Martin of The Philadelphia Inquirer wrote: "What passes for Southern accents in this one is astonishing to fans on both sides of the Mason-Dixon Line. But, for that matter, so is the dialogue, the direction and the performance as a whole. ... Not content with just designing the production, William Cameron Menzies also directed. He should have stopped when he was ahead."

== Legacy ==
King Brothers Productions announced plans to reunite James Craig, Guy Madison and Barbara Payton in a sequel film titled Murder March about Sherman's March to the Sea, but the film was never produced.
