= Melissa Berton (educator) =

- Occupation(s): Educator, producer, social activist, speaker
- Website: melissaberton.com

Melissa Berton is an American educator, producer, and social activist. She is the founder and executive director of The Pad Project, a nonprofit organization focused on menstrual equity. Berton gained recognition as the producer of Period. End of Sentence., a documentary that won the Academy Award for Best Documentary Short Film in 2019.

== Career ==
Berton has worked as a high school teacher in Los Angeles, where she has been involved in social justice initiatives with her students. In 2013, she and her students at Oakwood School co-founded The Pad Project, a nonprofit organization dedicated to addressing period poverty and menstrual stigma.

As part of this initiative, Berton served as a producer for the 2018 documentary Period. End of Sentence., which explores menstrual health challenges in rural India. The film won the Academy Award for Best Documentary Short Film in 2019.

=== The Pad Project ===
The Pad Project was founded in 2013 to support menstrual health education and increase access to affordable menstrual products. The organization collaborates with local initiatives to provide resources in underserved communities globally.

Berton's advocacy work has been recognized with several awards, including the Forbes 50 Over 50 for her contributions to menstrual equity, the Eleanor Roosevelt Global Women's Rights Award from the Feminist Majority Foundation, and the Apne Aap Last Girl Award to End Human Trafficking (2023) for her efforts in addressing period poverty.

=== Writing and Film Work ===
Berton has contributed articles on menstrual health and social activism to various publications. In 2021, she wrote an opinion piece for Variety reflecting on the impact of Period. End of Sentence. and its role in raising awareness of menstrual equity. She has also worked on a screenplay adaptation involving the poet, Dylan Thomas.
