= Charles Findlay Davidson =

British geologist

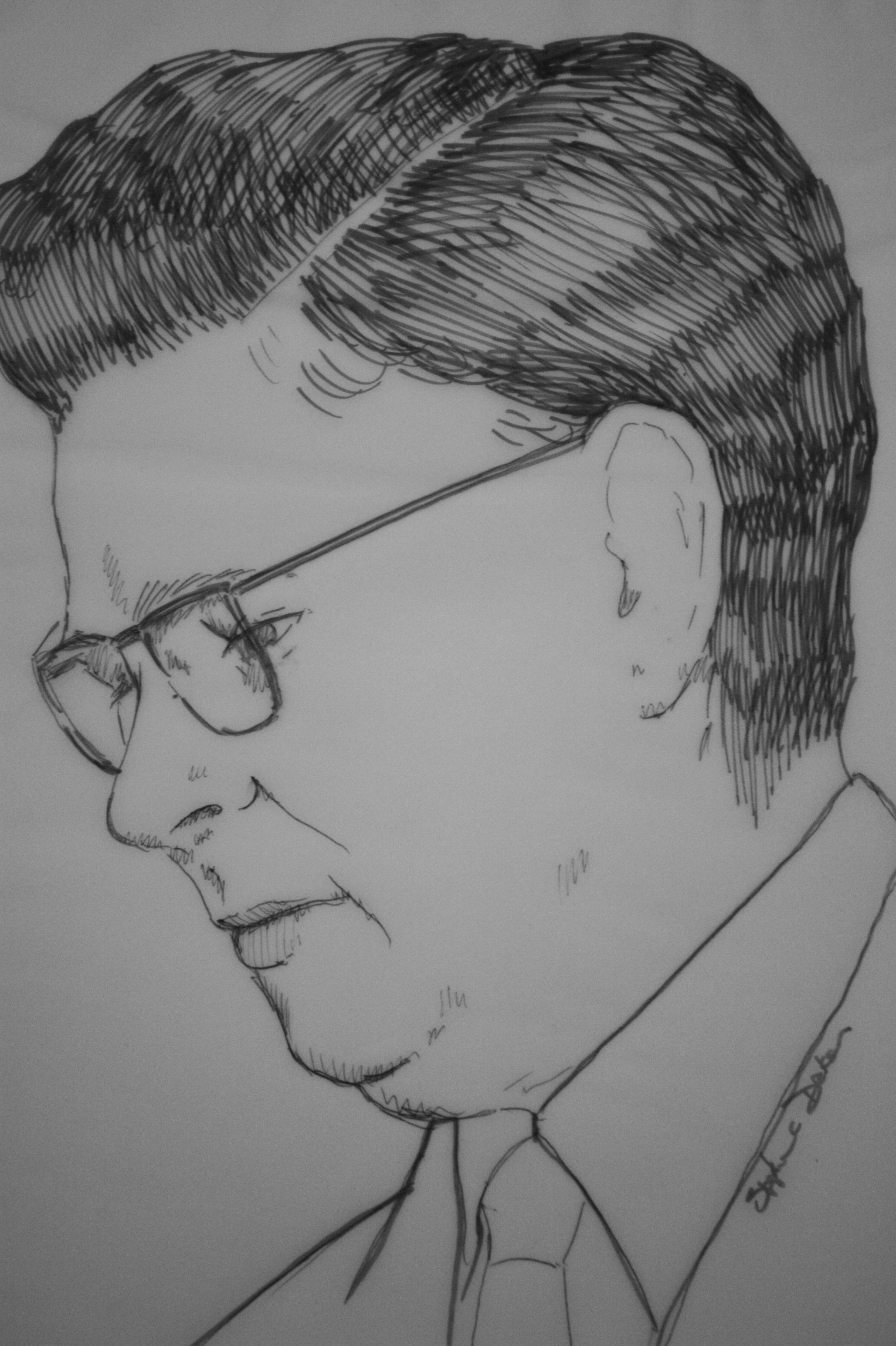
Sketch of Charles Findlay Davidson, 1911-1967

Charles Findlay Davidson OBE FRSE FGS MIMM (16 July 1911 - 1 November 1967) was a Scottish geologist. He served as Vice President of the Royal Society of Edinburgh. He was Assistant Curator to the Museum of Practical Geology in London and Chief Geologist of the British Geological Survey.

== Life ==
He was born in Monifieth in northern Scotland on 16 July 1911, the son of John Davidson. His early education was at Morgan Academy in Dundee. He studied Geology and Mineralogy at the University of St Andrews, graduating with a first-class honours BSc in 1933. The university later awarded him an honorary doctorate (DSc) in 1942.

In 1934 he got a post as Assistant Curator within the Geology Section of the Natural History Museum at South Kensington.

In 1935 he was elected a Fellow of the Royal Society of Edinburgh. His proposers were D'Arcy Wentworth Thompson, Sir John S Flett, A.D.Peacock, John Pringle, James Alexander Richey and Douglas Alexander Allan. He served as their vice president from 1963 to 1966.

In the Second World War he was the official geological advisor to British Intelligence. He was appointed Chief Geologist to the government in 1944 and was tasked with sourcing Uranium for the British atomic aims. From 1946 to 1954 he was entitled Chief Geologist of the UK's Atomic Energy Division. As a result, he was discoverer of major uranium deposits in Canada (assisted by local geologist, Franc Joubin). During this period he was one of the world's most travelled persons, covering an estimated 50,000 miles per annum. He was jointly responsible for identifying Witwatersrand in South Africa as one of the world's primary sources of Uranium. Whilst in the UK he was based at the Harwell Laboratory.

He was awarded the Order of the British Empire (OBE) in the 1953 New Years Honours List.

In 1955 he was appointed Professor of Geology at St Andrews University. He was awarded the Lyell Medal by the Geological Society of London in 1965 and given honorary membership of the Geological Society of America in 1966.

He died of a heart attack at his home, Gowan Park on the outskirts of Cupar in Fife on 1 November 1967. He was posthumously awarded the Neill Prize by the Royal Society of Edinburgh.

== Family ==
In 1938 he married Helen McLean Wallace. They had four sons.

== Publications ==
See

- Prospector’s Handbook to Radioactive Mineral Deposits (1949)
- The Distribution of Radioactivity (1951)
- On the Impersistence of Uranite as a Detrital Mineral (1953)
- On the Occurrence of Uranium in Ancient Conglomerates (1959)
- Geology in the Service of Mankind (1962)

== Other Positions Held ==
see

- Member of the Raw Materials Panel
- Secretary of the Cabinet Advisory Committee on Atomic Energy (1946–7)
- Member of the Strategic Materials Committee, Ministry of Supply (1947–8)
- Associate Editor of Economic Geology (1953)
- Member of the Geochemical Society's Book Translation Committee (1961)
- Member of the American Geological Institute's Translation Committee (1961)
- Vice President for Europe of the Society of Economic Geologists (1955–58)
- Council Member of the Mineralogical Society of Great Britain and Ireland (1942–54)
- Fellow of the Geological Society of London (1934 onwards)
- Member of the Institute of Mining and Metallurgy (1955 onwards)
- Fellow of the Mineralogical Society of America (1949 onwards)
