= Sidney Harmon =

American film producer (1907–1988)

Sidney Harmon (April 30, 1907 – February 29, 1988) was a movie producer and screenwriter. Harmon was nominated for the 1942 Academy Award for Best Story for the movie The Talk of the Town. He began his career working as a writer for radio and the theater during the 1930s. Harmon produced Sidney Kingsley's Pulitzer Prize-winning play Men In White.

== Biography ==
Born in Poughkeepsie, New York in 1907, Harmon produced Broadway plays throughout the 1930s (1931–1937). Harmon was one of many members of the Group Theatre to become involved with movie production. He married artist Lily Harmon (née Perlmutter) in 1934; they divorced in 1940. He worked with movies from the 1940s to the 1960s. In 1959, he co-founded the Theatre Group at the University of California at Los Angeles with John Houseman and Robert Ryan.

Harmon, with Ryan and others, initiated the Oakwood School in California in 1951.

During retirement, Harmon was active in the cultural life of Palm Springs, California; he was the first director emeritus of the McCallum Theatre in Palm Desert. The Desert Theatre League's Sidney Harmon Award honored members "in recognition of the advancement of theatrical excellence both on and off the stage".

Harmon died in Rancho Mirage, California on February 29, 1988.

== Career ==
=== Writer (1940s–1960s) ===
- The Talk of the Town (1942) (story) ... aka George Stevens' The Talk of the Town
- Drums in the Deep South (1951) (screenplay)
- Mara Maru (1952) (story)
- Mutiny (1952) (writer)
- Man Crazy (1953) (writer)
- Hand in Hand (1960) (story)

=== Producer (1950s–1960s) ===
- Man Crazy (1953) (producer)
- The Big Combo (1955) (producer)
- The Wild Party (1956) (producer)
- Men in War (1957) (producer)
- God's Little Acre (1958) (producer)
- Anna Lucasta (1958) (producer)
- Day of the Outlaw (1959) (producer)
- The Thin Red Line (1964) (producer)
- Battle of the Bulge (1965) (executive producer)

=== Miscellaneous Crew ===
- Men in War (1957) (presenter)
