= List of Furman University people =

The list of Furman University people includes alumni, attendees, faculty, and staff of Furman University.

== Presidents ==
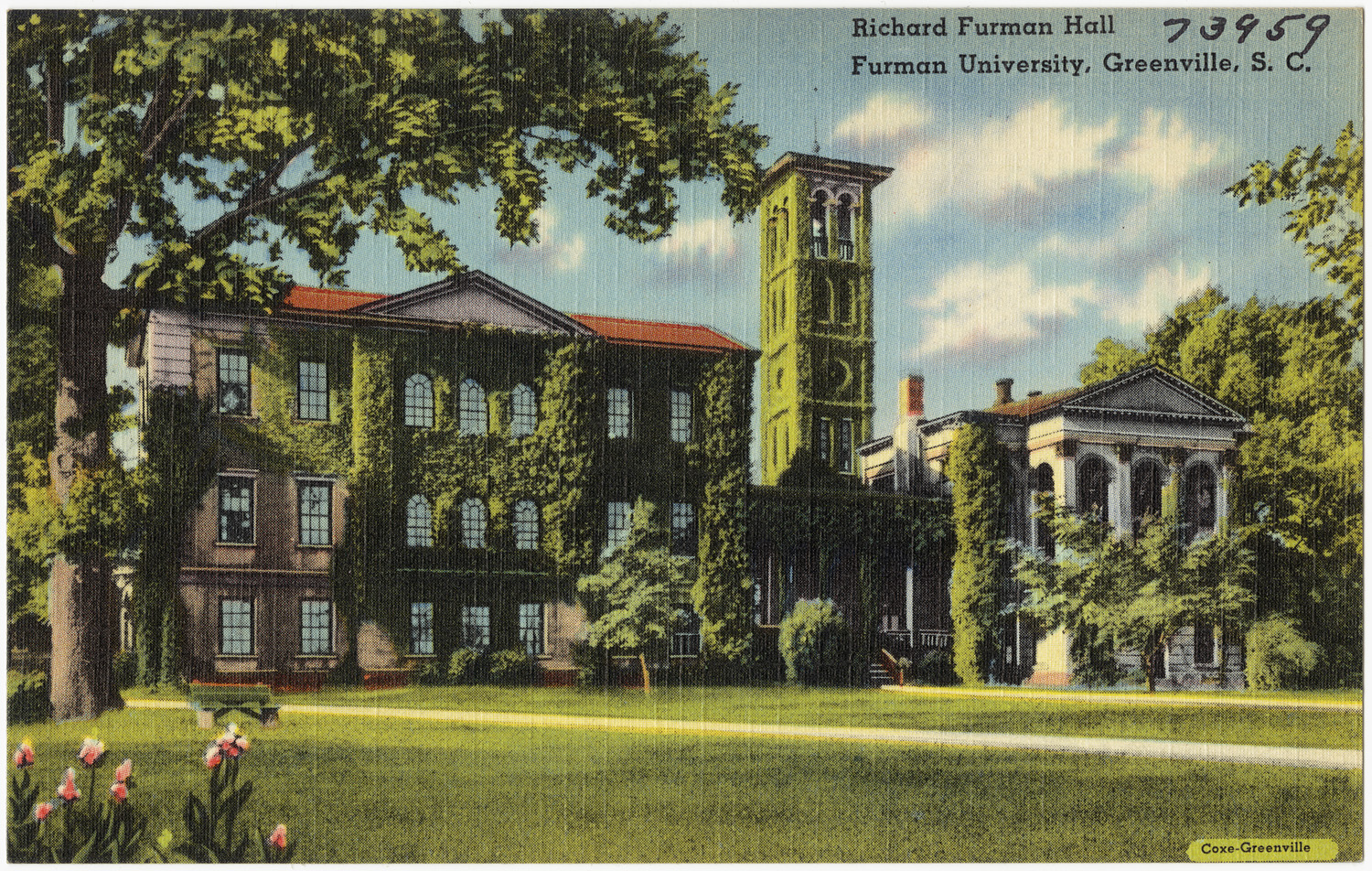
The old campus of Furman University, prior to its relocation under the presidency of John Laney Plyler

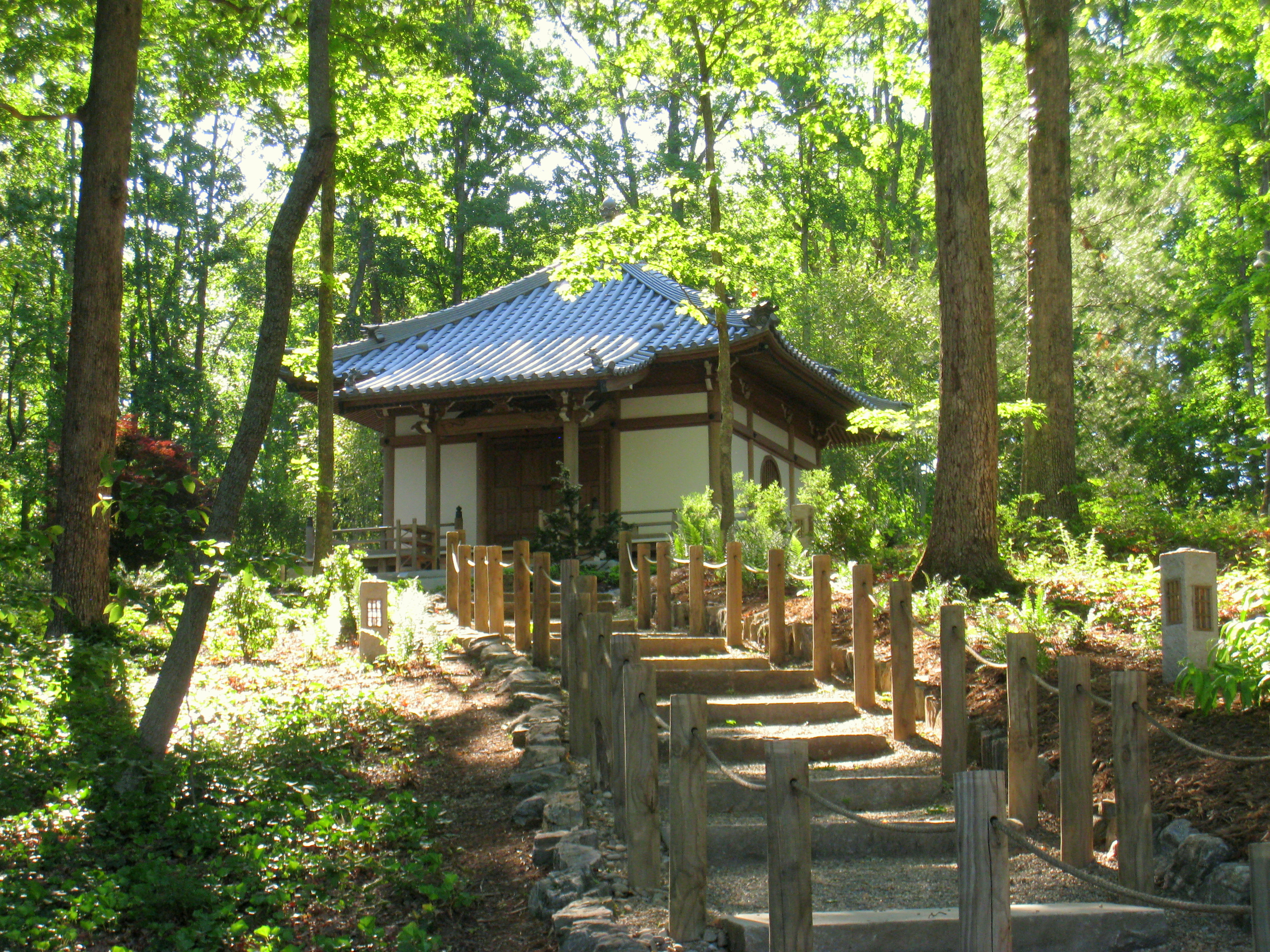
This temple was transported from Nagoya to Furman University in 2004, under the presidency of David Shi.

1. James Clement Furman was elected the first president of Furman University in 1859. He served for twenty years, until 1879.
2. Charles Manly served as president from 1859 to 1879. He was a Baptist minister. Manly Hall (built in 1956) is named after him. He is credited for allowing the campus to become more residential, in contrast to previous administrators who did not favor dormitories.
3. Andrew Philip Montague was president for five years, from 1897 to 1902. While his two predecessors were involved in Christian life prior to being presidents, Montague was dean at Columbia University.
4. Charles Hallette Judson was acting president over a year, from 1902 to 1903. Prior to this, he was president of the Greenville Woman's College.
5. Edwin McNeill Poteat strengthened the university in many ways during his fifteen-year presidency, from 1903 to 1918. He encouraged the recruiting of faculty with advanced degrees, including the first PhD to be hired at Furman, Sidney Ernest Bradshaw.
6. After the previous president resigned to pursue mission work in China, Sidney Ernest Bradshaw became interim president for one year (1918–1919) while the board of trustees prepared to hire the next president.
7. William Joseph McGlothlin, a professor of church history, came from the Southern Baptist Theological Seminar in 1919 to serve as president at Furman, where he remained in this post until 1933.
8. Bennette Eugene Geer became president in 1933. His friendship with James Buchanan Duke was instrumental to name Furman as a beneficiary of the Duke Endowment. In the terms of the endowment, Furman was referred to as "that little college located in Greenville that Ben Geer is such a fool about". Geer was a graduate of Furman, and as such, the first Furman graduate to assume the presidency. Financial support progressed under Geer's presidency, echoing his own times when he was able to afford education at Furman in part thanks to living in the house of then president Manly. His presidency ended in 1938.
9. Robert Norman Daniel was acting president during the remainder of 1938.
10. John Laney Plyler oversaw a transformation of Furman during a long presidency of 25 years, from 1939 to 1964. He received a Bachelor of Arts degree from Furman, and was trained at the Harvard Law School. Under his presidency, land was bought for the new campus, and Furman moved from downtown Greenville to its current location.
11. Gordon Williams Blackwell was president of Florida State University, and became the new president of Furman in 1965. His interest in excellence by national standards contributed to the transformation of Furman as a higher education institute of national stature, as it is still categorized today (among national liberal arts universities). His term ended after ten years, in 1976.
12. John Edwin Johns was president of Furman from 1976 to 1994. He had a distinguished military career with several military honors (e.g., Flying Cross, Air Medal) and flew 35 combat missions in Europe during World War II aboard a B-17 aircraft. A graduate of Furman, he received a PhD in history from the University of North Carolina. After a long academic career at Stetson University culminating in its presidency, he joined Furman as president, and grew the university's endowment tenfold through capital campaigns.
13. David Emory Shi, a historian, author and champion of sustainability, served as the university's president from 1994 to 2010. He highlighted some of his accomplishments as "faculty salaries improved dramatically, the endowment quadrupled, the academic profile of the student body rose, and the campus benefited from more than $210 million in new construction and renovation".
14. Rodney A. Smolla, a nationally known lawyer, held the presidency for three years, from 2010 to 2013. For personal reasons, he stepped down from the post. He described Furman as "one of the gems of American higher education", for which he is remembered for a continued growth of application for admissions and the endowment.
15. Carl F. Kohrt was interim president for a year, from 2013 to 2014.
16. Elizabeth Davis became Furman's president on July 1, 2014. She came to Furman from Baylor University in Texas, where she was executive vice president and provost. The Furman Advantage was launched under her presidency.

== Notable alumni ==
=== Science ===
- Brad Cox (Class of 1967) - computer scientist, creator of the Objective-C programming language
- Howard Davis (Class of 1959) - chemical engineer
- Wilton R. Earle (Class of 1923) - cell biologist
- Hans Einstein (Class of 1942) - foremost authority on the lung disease Valley fever
- Thomas T. Goldsmith (Class of 1931) - physicist who helped pioneer the invention of color television, inventor of the first video game
- Sandra Greer - physical chemist in the field of thermodynamics
- Paige Harden (Class of 2003) - psychologist and behavior geneticist, Award for Distinguished Scientific Early Career Contributions to Psychology from the American Psychological Association
- Valerie Horsley (Class of 1998) - biologist
- Frances Ligler (Class of 1973) - biochemist and bioengineer, 2017 inductee of the National Inventors Hall of Fame
- Julie McElrath (Class of 1973) - leading HIV immunology and vaccine researcher
- Earle K. Plyler (Class of 1917) - physicist and pioneer in the field of molecular spectroscopy
- Albert Ernest Radford (Class of 1939) - botanist, known for the Manual of the Vascular Flora of the Carolinas, the definitive flora for North Carolina and South Carolina
- Charles Townes (Class of 1935) - 1964 Nobel Prize in Physics winner, inventor of the maser, laid theoretical groundwork for invention of laser
- John B. Watson (Class of 1899) - psychologist, founder of behaviorism
- John H. Wotiz (Class of 1941) - organic chemist

=== Arts and theatre ===
- Elizabeth Bishop (Class of 1989) - mezzo-soprano with the Metropolitan Opera New York
- Robert Blocker (Class of 1968) - dean of the Yale School of Music and classical pianist
- John Bloomfield (Class of 1975) - pianist
- Jay Bocook (Class of 1975) - composer and arranger, work featured at 1984 Olympic Games
- Ben Browder (Class of 1985) - three-time Saturn Award winner for Best Actor on Television for Farscape
- Rudy Currence (Class of 2002) - Grammy-nominated Gospel artist, songwriter, producer
- Jim David (Class of 1976) - comedian on Comedy Central Presents, actor, writer
- Seth Gilliard (Class of 2012) - violinist
- Amy Grant - 6-time Grammy Award-winning singer and Christian musician
- Debbie Hughes (Class of 1981) - artist and illustrator
- Victoria Jackson - actress and comedian, former cast member of NBC Saturday Night Live
- Robert Joel (Class of 1965) - actor in the early openly gay film A Very Natural Thing
- Keith Lockhart (Class of 1981) - conductor of the Boston Pops
- Emile Pandolfi (Class of 1968) - pianist
- Bear Rinehart (Class of 2003) - lead vocalist of Needtobreathe, a Grammy-nominated and six-time GMA Dove Award-winning modern rock band
- Ginny Ruffner - glass artist
- Sintax the Terrific (Class of 1998) - Christian hip hop artist and founder of Deepspace5
- Virginia Uldrick (Class of 1951) - music and drama teacher, founder and first president of the South Carolina Governor's School for the Arts & Humanities
- Frankie Welch - fashion designer
- Donald Reid Womack (Class of 1988) - composer and professor, University of Hawaii

=== Academics, writers, journalists, and publishers ===
- Eleanor Beardsley (Class of 1986) - journalist, NPR correspondent from France
- Furman Bisher - sports writer and columnist
- Maurice Bloomfield (Class of 1877) - Austrian-born U.S. philologist and Sanskrit scholar
- Tomiko Brown-Nagin (Class of 1992) - legal historian and professor at Harvard Law School and Harvard University
- Vernon Burton (Class of 1969) - Southern historian and author of Age of Lincoln
- Betsy Byars - children's author, winner of Newbery Medal, National Book Award, Edgar Award and Regina Medal
- Marshall Frady (Class of 1963) - Emmy Award-winning journalist and biographer
- Lois Gladys Leppard (Class of 1946) - author of the Mandie children's novels
- John Matthews Manly (M.A. Class of 1884) - philologist and professor of English literature and philology at the University of Chicago
- Raven I. McDavid Jr. (Class of 1931) - linguist, dialectologist
- Edmund Outslay (Class of 1974) - finance author and Deloitte/Michael Licata Endowed Professor of Taxation at Michigan State University
- Bennie Lee Sinclair (Class of 1961) - poet, novelist, and short story writer; South Carolina Poet Laureate 1986–2000; Pulitzer Prize nominee
- George Singleton (Class of 1980) - novelist
- Cecil Staton (Class of 1980) - politician, member of the Georgia Senate and chancellor of East Carolina University
- Allie Beth Stuckey (Class of 2014) - conservative commentator with BlazeTV and Conservative Review, frequent guest on Fox News
- Jack Sullivan - literary scholar, musicologist and author
- Phyllis Tickle (M.A. Class of 1961) - author of spirituality and religion works
- Joshua Treviño (Class of 1997) - political commentator
- Angela L. Walker Franklin (Class of 1981) - president of Des Moines University
- Robert Whitlow (Class of 1976) - author and filmmaker
- George S. Wise - sociologist, first president of Tel Aviv University

=== Business ===
- Ravenel B. Curry III (Class of 1963) - businessman and philanthropist, founder and president of Eagle Capital Management
- David C. Garrett, Jr. (Class of 1942) - former CEO of Delta Air Lines
- John D. Hollingsworth - businessman, textile machinery inventor, and philanthropist
- Sanjay Kumar - former CEO of Computer Associates, sentenced to 12 years in prison for his role in a massive accounting fraud
- Herman Lay - founder of Lay's, later creating the largest-selling snack food company in the US, the Frito-Lay corporation
- Kathryn Petralia (Class of 1992) - founder of Kabbage
- Paula Wallace (Class of 1970) - founder of Savannah College of Art and Design

=== Politics and law ===
- Robert T. Ashmore (Class of 1927) - United States representative from South Carolina
- Julius H. Baggett (Class of 1948) - member of the South Carolina House of Representatives 1967–1968 and 1970–1974
- Ibra Charles Blackwood - former governor of South Carolina
- Joseph R. Bryson - US congressman from South Carolina's 4th District
- Maurice G. Burnside (Class of 1926) - United States representative from West Virginia
- Richard Cash (Class of 1982) - member of the South Carolina Senate
- Judy Clarke (Class of 1974) - criminal defense attorney who has represented high-profile defendants such as Ted Kaczynski ("The Unabomber"), Eric Robert Rudolph, Dzhokhar Tsarnaev, and Zacarias Moussaoui
- Wes Climer (Class of 2006) - member of the South Carolina Senate
- Neal Collins (Class of 2004) - member of the South Carolina House of Representatives
- Richard Cullen (Class of 1971) - former attorney general of Virginia and high-profile lawyer
- Thomas T. Cullen (Class of 2000) - United States district judge
- Tom Davis (Class of 1982) - South Carolina state senator and chief of staff to Governor Mark Sanford
- William Dimitrouleas (Class of 1973) - United States district judge
- Joseph H. Earle (Class of 1867) - member of the South Carolina House of Representatives 1878–1882, member of the South Carolina Senate 1882–1886, South Carolina attorney general 1886–1890; United States senator from South Carolina in 1897
- Willa L. Fulmer (Class of 1904) - United States representative from South Carolina
- Elizabeth Hawley Gasque - US congresswoman from South Carolina's 6th Congressional District
- Michael E. Guest (Class of 1979) - U.S. ambassador to Romania
- Wilton E. Hall (Class of 1924) - newspaper publisher and United States senator from South Carolina 1944–1945
- Clement Haynsworth (Class of 1933) - former United States judge, unsuccessful nominee for the United States Supreme Court
- Christina Henderson (Class of 2008) - member of the Council of the District of Columbia
- Baron Hill (Class of 1975) - United States representative from Indiana
- Frank Holleman (Class of 1976) - U.S. deputy secretary of education 1999–2001
- Kim Jackson (Class of 2006 - member of the Georgia Senate
- Katie Lane (Class of 2014) - United States district judge
- Deborah Malac (Class of 1977) - United States ambassador to Uganda
- William L. Mauldin - 59th lieutenant governor of South Carolina, railroad executive
- Libby Mitchell (Class of 1962) - Maine politician
- Anne-Leigh Gaylord Moe (Class of 2001) - United States district judge
- Roger C. Peace (Class of 1919) - United States senator from South Carolina
- William H. Perry (Class of 1857) - United States representative from South Carolina
- William P Price - U.S. representative from Georgia
- Richard Riley (Class of 1954) - governor of South Carolina 1979–1987, later U.S. secretary of education under the Clinton administration 1993–2001
- Thomas A. Roe (Class of 1948) - conservative philanthropist, founder of the South Carolina Policy Council
- Madeline Rogero (Class of 1979) - first female mayor of Knoxville, Tennessee
- Mark Sanford (Class of 1982) - former United States representative and governor of South Carolina
- John Calhoun Sheppard (Class of 1871) - 82nd governor of South Carolina
- Alexander Stubb (Class of 1993) - president of Finland and leader of the Coalition Party
- Nick Theodore (Class of 1952) - lieutenant governor of South Carolina 1987–1995
- David Tolbert (Class of 1979) - president of the International Center for Transitional Justice
- David Trone (Class of 1977) - United States representative from Maryland; founder of Total Wine & More
- Johnnie Mac Walters (Class of 1942) - commissioner of Internal Revenue 1971–1973
- Henry Hitt Watkins (M.A. Class of 1883) - United States district judge
- Robby Wells (Class of 1990) - failed political candidate for president and former Savannah State University football coach
- Druanne White (Class of 1981) - trial lawyer in South Carolina
- John J. Wicker Jr. - member of the Virginia Senate
- Rob Woodall (Class of 1992) - United States representative from Georgia

=== Military and intelligence ===
- Kimberly Hampton - captain in the United States Army; first American female pilot to die in combat
- Jamie Lee Henry - major in the United States Army Medical Corps; first openly transgender officer in the United States Armed Forces
- Richard Longo (Class of 1980) - major general of the United States Army and deputy commanding general and chief of staff for U.S. Army Europe
- John Michael McConnell (Class of 1967) - served as director of the National Security Agency and director of National Intelligence
- John F. Mulholland, Jr. (Class of 1978) - lieutenant general of United States Army
- Robert G. Owens Jr. (Class of 1938) - major general of the United States Marine Corps and flying ace
- James Pasquarette (Class of 1983) - lieutenant general of the United States Army
- Kevin R. Wendel (Class of 1979) - United States Army major general

=== Religion ===
- Casey Cole (Class of 2011) - Catholic priest, writer, and blogger
- James Crenshaw (Class of 1956) - theologist and professor of the Old Testament at Duke University Divinity School and world leading scholar in Old Testament literature
- F. W. Dobbs-Allsopp (Class of 1984) - Biblical scholar
- Ligon Duncan (Class of 1983) - president of the Alliance of Confessing Evangelicals
- Kirkman Finlay (Class of 1899) - first bishop of the Episcopal Diocese of Upper South Carolina
- Pleasant Daniel Gold - Baptist minister
- Duke Kimbrough McCall (Class of 1935) - executive member of the Southern Baptist Convention; president of the Southern Baptist Theological Seminary
- Earl Paulk (Class of 1947) - founder of Chapel Hill Harvester Church
- Issachar Jacox Roberts (Class of 1828) - Baptist missionary in China
- Stacy F. Sauls (Class of 1977) - bishop for the Episcopal Diocese of Lexington 2000–2011
- Rembert S. Truluck (Class of 1956) - theologian

=== Athletes ===
==== Basketball ====
- Kristofer Acox (Class of 2017) - Icelandic basketball player for KR of the Úrvalsdeild karla; member of the Icelandic national basketball team
- Robby Bostain (Class of 2007) - American-Israeli basketball player
- Janet Cone (Class of 1978) - head athletic director of UNC Asheville Bulldogs, formerly head coach for and athletic director of Samford Bulldogs
- Beth Couture (M.A. Class of 1987) - head coach of the Butler Bulldogs women's basketball team
- Darrell Floyd (Class of 1956) - two-time NCAA Consensus All-American basketball player
- Jordan Loyd - professional basketball player for the Toronto Raptors and Valencia Basket
- Clyde Mayes (Class of 1975) - professional basketball player for the Milwaukee Bucks
- Bobby Roberts (Class of 1953) - head men's basketball coach for Clemson University 1962–1970
- Frank Selvy (Class of 1954) - former NBA All-Star; holds current NCAA Division I record for the most points scored (100) in a single basketball game
- Jalen Slawson (Class of 2023) - professional basketball player for the Sacramento Kings
- Derek Waugh (Class of 1993) - head men's basketball coach at Stetson University

==== Football ====
- Brian Bratton (Class of 2005) - NFL player, rookie free agent for the Atlanta Falcons in 2005, formerly a receiver for Baltimore Ravens assigned to the Cologne Centurions of NFL Europe
- Luther Broughton (Class of 1997) - former NFL tight end
- Robbie Caldwell (Class of 1976) - former head coach at Vanderbilt University and currently coach at Clemson University
- Dakota Dozier (Class of 2014) - NFL offensive guard for the New York Jets, drafted by the Jets in the fourth round of the 2014 NFL draft
- Jerome Felton (Class of 2008) - former NFL All-Pro fullback, 5th-round draft pick by the Detroit Lions in 2008 NFL draft
- Chas Fox (Class of 1986) - former NFL wide receiver, 4th-round draft pick by the Kansas City Chiefs in 1986 NFL draft
- Louis Ivory (Class of 2002) - college football running back, won the 2000 Walter Payton Award
- Stanford Jennings (Class of 1984) - former NFL player for the Cincinnati Bengals, scored a touchdown in Super Bowl XXIII; current New Balance sales executive
- Ingle Martin (Class of 2006) - NFL player, quarterback for Kansas City Chiefs
- Billy Napier (Class of 2002) - head coach of the University of Florida football team; former head coach of the Louisiana Ragin' Cajuns
- Kavis Reed (Class of 1995) - former CFL player, head coach of Edmonton Eskimos
- Orlando Ruff (Class of 1999) - NFL player for Cleveland Browns
- Terry Smith (Class of 1982) - former NFL player for New England Patriots; head coach of the Great Britain national American football team
- Kevin Steele - defense coordinator of the University of Miami, former head coach of Baylor University's Bears
- David Whitehurst (Class of 1977) - former quarterback for the Green Bay Packers
- Sam Wyche (Class of 1968) - former NFL quarterback and head coach; led Cincinnati Bengals to Super Bowl XXIII

==== Golf ====
- Beth Daniel (Class of 1978) - LPGA Tour, World Golf Hall of Fame, 32 career victories
- Brad Faxon (Class of 1983) - eight-time winner on the PGA Tour, played on two Ryder Cup teams
- Bruce Fleisher (Class of 1968) - won the U.S. Amateur in 1968, professional golfer on the PGA Tour and the Champions Tour
- Betsy King (Class of 1977) - LPGA Tour, World Golf Hall of Fame, 34 career victories
- Dottie Pepper (Class of 1987) - former LPGA Tour champion; current NBC and Golf Channel commentator
- Sherri Turner (Class of 1979) - professional golfer, won the 1988 LPGA Championship
- Maggie Will (Class of 1987) - professional golfer, 3 LPGA Tour titles

==== Soccer ====
- Ricardo Clark - professional soccer player for Houston Dynamo, 2003 MLS Rookie of the Year runner-up, member of the United States men's national soccer team
- Clint Dempsey - professional soccer player for American team Seattle Sounders FC of the MLS, 2004 MLS Rookie of the Year and member of the United States men's national soccer team, only US player to score a goal in the 2006 World Cup, scored first American goal in 2010 World Cup in South Africa in 1-1 match versus England, first American player to record a hat-trick in the Premier League
- Lewis Hawke (Class of 2017) - professional soccer player for Montrose F.C.
- Alec Kann (Class of 2012) - professional soccer player for the MLS Atlanta United FC
- Jonathan Leathers (Class of 2008) - professional soccer player for Vancouver Whitecaps FC
- Drew Moor - professional soccer player for Toronto FC, member of the United States men's national soccer team 2007–2008
- John Barry Nusum (Class of 2002) - professional soccer player for the Virginia Beach Mariners and Philadelphia Kixx
- Sergei Raad (Class of 2004) - professional soccer player for the MLS Kansas City Wizards
- Shea Salinas (Class of 2008) - professional soccer player for the MLS San Jose Earthquakes
- Pete Santora (Class of 1998) - professional soccer player for the Albuquerque Geckos and Jacksonville Cyclones
- Walker Zimmerman - professional soccer player for the MLS FC Dallas, member of the United States men's national soccer team

==== Baseball ====
- Mike Buddie (Class of 1992) - professional baseball pitcher for the New York Yankees, current athletic director of the United States Military Academy
- Jay Jackson (Class of 2008) - professional baseball pitcher, for the Milwaukee Brewers
- Jerry Martin (Class of 1971) - professional baseball outfielder for the New York Mets
- Tom Mastny (Class of 2003) - MLB pitcher, former player for Cleveland Indians
- Bob Smith (Class of 1934) - head baseball coach for Clemson University 1952–1957
- Nate Smith (Class of 2013) - professional baseball pitcher for the Los Angeles Angels
- Rick Wilkins - professional baseball catcher for the Chicago Cubs

==== Other sports ====
- Paul Anderson - Olympic gold medalist and world champion in weightlifting
- Ryan Boyle - Paralympic silver medalist at the 2016 Rio Paralympic Games
- Ned Caswell - professional tennis player
- Kathlyn Kelley - Olympic high jumper who placed 9th at the 1936 Olympics in Berlin
- Angel Martino (Class of 1989) - Olympic gold medalist in swimming
- Nathan Riech - Paralympic gold medalist at the 2020 Tokyo Paralympic Games
- David Segal (Class of 1963) - Olympic bronze medalist in track and field
- Xavier Woods (Class of 2008) - professional wrestler for World Wrestling Entertainment
