= Charlie L. Russell =

American dramatist (1932–2013)

Charlie Louis Russell, Jr. (March 10, 1932 – June 28, 2013) was an American writer, best known for his play, Five on the Black Hand Side, which was later made into an acclaimed motion picture.

== Biography ==
Charlie L. Russell was born in Monroe, Louisiana, the eldest of two children of Charlie, Sr. and Katie Russell. His father moved to Oakland, California, in 1942 and became a shipyard worker. The family was reunited with the father a year later. Charlie and his younger brother, basketball legend Bill Russell, attended local Oakland schools. Charlie graduated from Oakland Technical High School. His interest in writing was sparked while he was a student at Santa Rosa Junior College.

After serving in Korea with the U.S. Army, Russell earned a B.S. in English from the University of San Francisco in 1959. He was also a member of the Dons 1956–57 and 1957–58 basketball teams. Russell was a member of the Harlem Writers Guild.

Russell wrote the play Five on the Black Hand Side, first performed Off Broadway in January 1970. He later adapted the play into a film, which was released by United Artists in 1973. While not a box-office hit, the film was highly praised and established a cult following. It received an NAACP Image Award for best screenplay. Ebony magazine also recognized Five on the Black Hand Side as one of the 10 best African-American films of all time.

In the early 1970s, Russell served as writer in residence at Barbara Ann Teer's National Black Theatre (NBT) in Harlem. At the NBT, Russell cowrote the play Organize! with Teer.

Russell's other works include the novella A Birthday Present for Katheryn Kenyatta and "Quietus," a short story published in Langston Hughes' Best Negro Short Stories. His play Relaxin' at Camarillo told the story of legendary saxophonist Charlie Parker's stay in a mental institution. Other plays included The Incident at Terminal Ecstasy Acres and In White America. Russell's novel The Worthy Ones was published by Jukebox Press in 2002.

Russell was married twice, and had a child from each marriage. Russell resided in Oakland where he was an active member of the California Writers Club until his death on June 28, 2013, after a battle with gastric cancer.

== See also ==
- Black Drama
