= Open Syllabus Project =

Open-source syllabus database

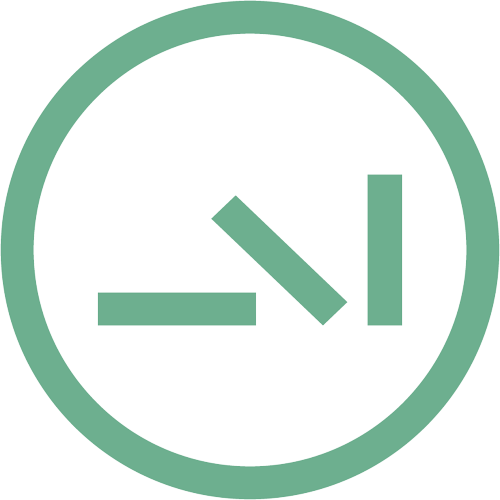

- Screenshot Homepage on 3 October 2022
- Company type: 501(c)(3) corporation
- Website type: Digital database
- Available in: English
- Headquarters: New York City, U.S.
- Country of origin: United States
- Area served: Worldwide
- Owner: Open Syllabus Inc.
- President: Joe Karaganis
- Managing director: Joe Karaganis
- Key people: David McClure (Vice-President and Secretary) (Note: McClure also serves as the project's Chief Technologist.); Amy Brand (Board Member); Dan Cohen (Board Member); Ted Byfield (Board Member)
- Industry: Educational research
- Revenue: ▲$1,942,525 (2020)
- Total assets: ▲$1,579,393 (2020)
- Employees: ▲5 (2020)
- Website: opensyllabus.org
- Commercial: No
- Registration: None
- Launched: January 2016; 10 years ago
- Current status: Active
- OCLC number: 973953893
- According to their 2020 Form 990.

The Open Syllabus Project (OSP) is an online open-source platform that catalogs and analyzes millions of college syllabi. Founded by researchers from the American Assembly at Columbia University, the OSP has amassed the most extensive collection of searchable syllabi. Since its beta launch in 2016, the OSP has collected over 7 million course syllabi from over 80 countries, primarily by scraping publicly accessible university websites. The project is directed by Joe Karaganis.

== History ==
The OSP was formed by a group of data scientists, sociologists, and digital-humanities researchers at the American Assembly, a public-policy institute based at Columbia University. The OSP was partly funded by the Sloan Foundation and the Arcadia Fund. Joe Karaganis, former vice-president of the American Assembly, serves as the project director of the OSP. The project builds on prior attempts to archive syllabi, such as H-Net, MIT OpenCourseWare, and historian Dan Cohen's defunct Syllabus Finder website (Cohen now sits on the OSP's advisory board). The OSP became a non-profit and independent of the American Assembly in November 2019.

In January 2016, the OSP launched a beta version of their "Syllabus Explorer," which they had collected data for since 2013. The Syllabus Explorer allows users to browse and search texts from over one million college course syllabi. The OSP launched a more comprehensive version 2.0 of the Syllabus Explorer in July 2019. The newer version includes an interactive visualization that displays texts as dots on a knowledge map. As of 2022, the OSP has collected over 7 million course syllabi. The Syllabus Explorer represents the "largest collection of searchable syllabi ever amassed."

== Methodology ==
The OSP has collected syllabi data from over 80 countries dating to 2000. The syllabi stem from over 4,000 worldwide institutions. Most of the OSP's data originates from the United States. Canada, Australia, and the U.K. also have large datasets.

The OSP primarily collects syllabi by scraping publicly accessible university websites. The OSP also allows syllabi submissions from faculty, students, and administrators. The OSP developers use machine learning and natural language processing to extract metadata from such syllabi. Since only metadata is collected, no individual syllabus or personal identifying information is found in the OSP database. The OSP classifies the syllabi into 62 subject fields – corresponding to the U.S. Department of Education's Classification of Instructional Programs (CIP). Additionally, the OSP assigns each text a "teaching score" from 0–100. This score represents the text's percentile rank among citations in the total citation count and is a numerical indicator of the relative frequency of which a particular work is taught. The OSP also has data on which texts are most likely to be assigned together.

The developers behind the OSP admit that the database is incomplete and likely contains "a fair number of errors." Karaganis estimates that 80–100 million syllabi exist in the United States alone. The OSP is unable to access syllabi behind private course-management software like Blackboard.

== Notable findings ==
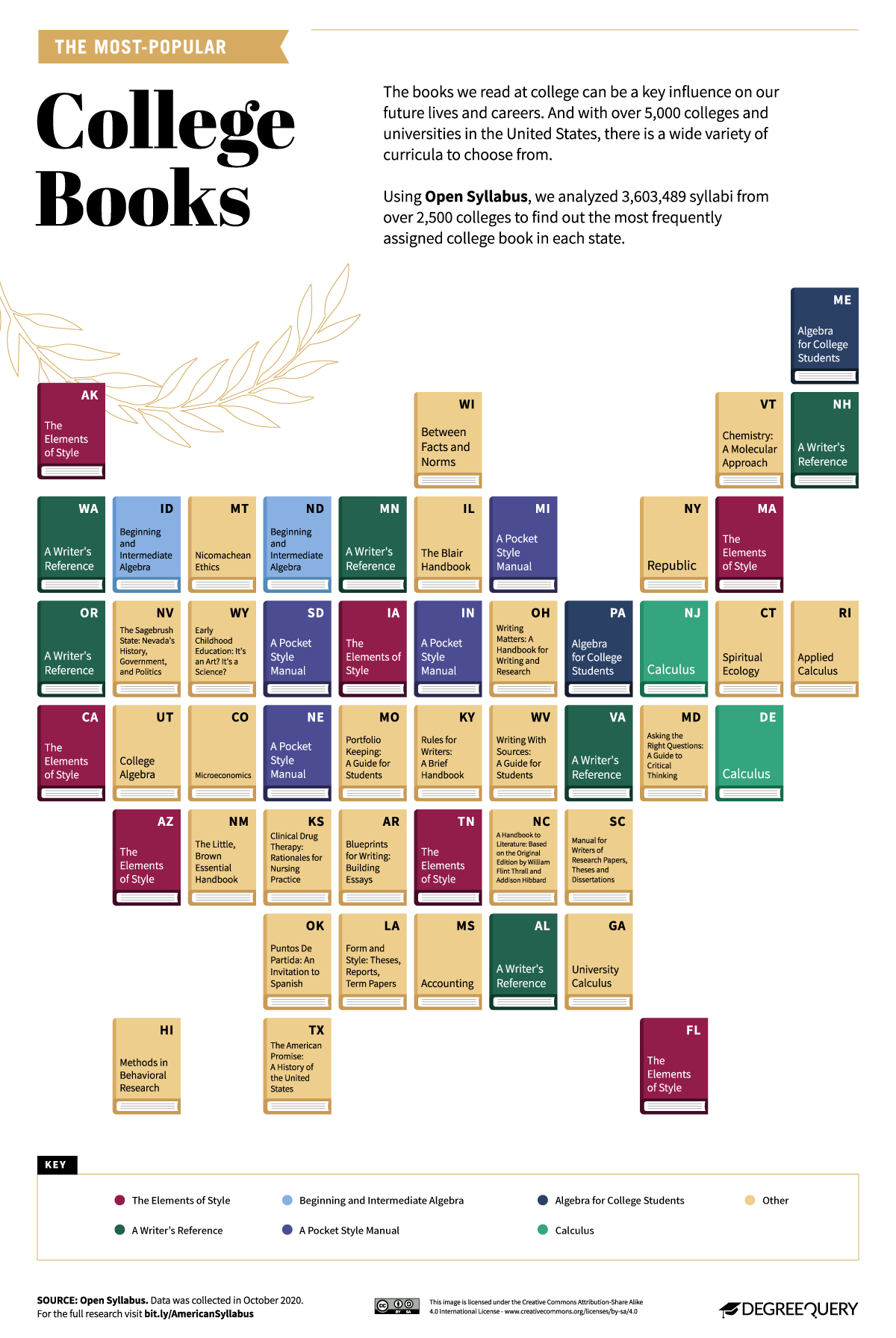
A chart, with data from the Open Syllabus Project, showing the most assigned books in college from each of the 50 U.S. states.

=== Anthropology ===
Using data from the OSP, anthropologist Laurence Ralph uncovered that black anthropologists are "woefully under-represented in (if not erased from) most anthropology syllabi." Black authors wrote less than 1 percent of the top 1,000 assigned works.

=== Economics ===
The database indicates Greg Mankiw is the most frequently cited author for college economics courses.

=== English literature ===
The OSP found that Mary Shelley's Frankenstein was the most widely taught novel in college courses. Additionally, the majority of novels published after 1945 taught in English classes were historical fiction.

=== Female writers ===
The most read female writer on college campuses is Kate L. Turabian for her A Manual for Writers of Research Papers, Theses, and Dissertations . Turabian is followed by Diana Hacker, Toni Morrison, Jane Austen, and Virginia Woolf.

=== Film ===
The most assigned film according to the OSP is the 1929 Soviet documentary film, Man with a Movie Camera. English filmmaker Alfred Hitchcock is the most assigned director in college courses.

=== History ===
Historians George Brown Tindall and David Emory Shi's America: A Narrative History is the number one assigned textbook for history, followed by Anne Moody's memoir, Coming of Age in Mississippi.

=== Philosophy ===
The most assigned texts in the field of philosophy include Aristotle's Nicomachean Ethics, John Stuart Mill's Utilitarianism, and Plato's Republic. Plato's Republic was also the second most assigned text in universities in the English-speaking world (only behind Strunk and White's Elements of Style).

=== Physics ===
David Halliday's et al. Fundamentals of Physics is the number one ranked physics textbook in the OSP's database.

=== Political science ===
Data from the OSP indicates that the dominant political science texts are written almost exclusively by white men and scholars based in the West. In the top 200 most-frequently assigned works, 15 are authored by at least one woman.

=== Public administration ===
American president Woodrow Wilson's article "The Study of Administration" was the most frequently assigned text in public affairs and administration syllabi.

== Reception ==
According to William Germano et al., the OSP is a "fascinating resource but is also prone to misrepresenting or at least distracting us from the most important business of a syllabus: communicating with students."

Historian William Caferro remarks that the OSP is a "tacit experience of sharing, but a useful one."

English professor Bart Beaty writes that, "Despite the many reservations about the completeness of its data, the OSP provides a rare opportunity for scholars to move beyond the anecdotal in discussions of canon-formation in teaching."

Media theorist Elizabeth Losh opines that "big data approaches", like the OSP, may "raise troubling questions for instructors about informed consent, pedagogical privacy, and quantified metrics."

== See also ==
- Digital preservation
- List of Web archiving initiatives
