= Michael Lythcott =

American entrepreneur and investor (born 1974)

Michael F. Lythcott
- Born: April 6, 1974 (age 52)
- Education: B.A. from University of Pennsylvania; MBA from Columbia University
- Occupations: entrepreneur investor
- Title: Founder of: PureAdvice; TrueCredit; Uplift Equity Partners; OnWax Media; STAR Industries, LLC.
- Parent: Barbara Ann Teer

Michael F. Lythcott (born April 6, 1974) is an American entrepreneur and investor who has founded several media and internet companies. He is the son of Barbara Ann Teer who founded Harlem's National Black Theatre in 1968, and the grandson of former Assistant Surgeon General George I. Lythcott.

== Early life and education ==
He completed a BA at University of Pennsylvania and MBA at Columbia University.

== Career ==
Lythcott has founded several companies, including PureAdvice, TrueCredit (a division of TrueLink), Uplift Equity Partners, OnWax Media, and STAR Industries, LLC, among others. After Truelink was sold to TransUnion in 2002, Lythcott Co-founded Uplift Equity Partners.

In 2004, while at Uplift, Lythcott formed Lythcott & Co, an incubator and holding company for his investments. In 2005, while a partner at Uplift Equity, he became the interim chairman and CEO of VAS Entertainment, a position he held until he was replaced by media scion Andrew Tow. As CEO of VAS, Lythcott executive produced several feature films, documentaries, and television shows, including the documentary Bra Boys starring Russell Crowe and Koby Abberton, the reality television show The Block for G4, and The Art of Flight starring professional snowboarder Travis Rice. While at VAS he acquired 11 media companies, including Studio 411, which he bought from Casey Wasserman's WMG.

In 2010, Lythcott and Co. partnered with the George Washington University School of Business to establish a proprietary customized MBA Program (STAR MBA). This program is specifically for professional athletes and entertainers to offer support for their future success as entrepreneurs and business owners. In 2013, Lythcott and Alex Rodriguez launched and incubated a second MBA program at the University of Miami School of Business. He retired from active involvement in these financial literacy and EMBA educational programs in 2017.

== Affiliations ==
- Board Chair, National Black Theatre,
- Board Vice Chair, Uptown Grand Central in Harlem.
