= Culture at 3 =

Culture at 3, stylized as Culture @ 3, is a call with Cultural organizations in New York City that grew out of the city's shutdown due to the COVID-19 pandemic. It is believed to be the first time the arts and cultural organizations of all genres have come together to address issues facing the cultural community.

The call is led by the CIG Chair Taryn Sacramone with Sade Lythcott, CEO of the National Black Theatre and Lucy Sexton, Executive Director of New Yorkers for Culture & Arts (NY4CA). Initially, a daily call brought together 500 participating organizations. However, as organizations reopened and their needs evolved, the call frequency was adjusted to better serve them.
