= Five on the Black Hand Side =

1973 comedy film by Oscar Williams

- Directed by: Oscar Williams
- Written by: Charlie L. Russell
- Produced by: Brock Peters; Michael Tolan
- Starring: Clarice Taylor; Leonard Jackson; Virginia Capers; Glynn Turman; Bonnie Banfield; D'Urville Martin
- Cinematography: Gene Polito
- Edited by: Michael Economou
- Music by: H. B. Barnum
- Distributed by: United Artists
- Release date: October 25, 1973
- Running time: 96 minutes
- Country: United States
- Language: English
- Budget: $200,000
- Box office: $1,367,000 (US/Canada rentals)

Five on the Black Hand Side is a 1973 African-American comedy film based on the 1969 play of the same name by Charlie L. Russell. It was shot in Downtown Los Angeles, California. Leonard Jackson appeared as John Henry Brooks. He was cast in Steven Spielberg's The Color Purple fifteen years later.

Five on the Black Hand Side was conceived as "an antidote" to the "blaxploitation" films of the era. The film's tagline was: "You've been coffy-tized, blacula-rized and super-flied – but now you're gonna be glorified, unified and filled-with-pride... when you see Five on the Black Hand Side."

== Plot ==
During the weekend of her daughter's wedding, Mrs. Gladys Ann Brooks, a meek wife (played by Clarice Taylor) and her three children—Gideon Brooks (Glynn Turman), Booker T. Washington-Brooks (D'Urville Martin), and Gail Brooks (Bonnie Banfield)—finally decide to stand up to their overbearing husband and father Mr. John Henry Brooks Jr. (Leonard Jackson) who displays retrogressive behavior.

Mrs. Brooks is tired of everybody treating her "like an old couch" and decides to leave her husband if he does not change his abusive behavior. Mr. Brooks controls every moment of his wife's life. Unlike his children, he considers himself "American" not "African". He does not agree with the fact that his daughter Gail is having an African themed wedding. His younger son Gideon does not talk to him and refuses to stay in the same room with his father. Gideon camps on the roof, instead, where he practices martial arts (by that time an important element of the Black Power movement). Mrs. Brooks joins her son on the roof in a civil rights movement after invading her husband's barbershop, where women are not allowed, where she hands Mr. Brooks a list of demands. She, for example, requires him to call her by her first name "Gladys", while Mr. Brooks insists on calling her Mrs. Brooks. Mr. Brooks finally changes his behavior and all the family members gather at Gail's and her new husband Marvin's "African" wedding.

== In pop culture ==
The relationship between the parents in this movie was parodied in a skit of the same name on the comedy series In Living Color. The film went into limited release in theaters, but helped launch the careers of Glynn Turman and Ja'net DuBois: he did films and TV, landing mostly African-American characters, leading to the role of Bradford Taylor on the TV Show A Different World and she became famous as Willona on the TV hit Good Times.

== Background ==
Five on the Black Hand Side was originally a play written by Charlie L. Russell. It was Russell's first Off-Broadway play, which was produced by American Place Theatre and directed by Barbara Ann Teer. Since the opening in 1969, the play was performed 62 times.

Russell was working as a play doctor (revised plays before production) at a theatre when he came up with the idea of Five on the Black Hand Side. First, Russell only worked out a draft, but had to finish the script when he met Luther James, a member of the Harlem Writers Guild. As Russell said himself, he wanted to "mix comedy and the political thing", as the 1960s and 1970s were an era full of political changes. He got inspired by women's liberation movement that was happening at City College. Originally, the play was named Gladys, after Mrs. Brooks' character as a reference to the Women's liberation movement.

It took Russell about six months to rewrite the play into the movie script, the film was then released in 1973. Like in the plays, the character of Mrs. Brooks was again played by Clarice Taylor. Russell knew her from The Negro Ensemble Company. As he said, "She created the part. She is a wonderful woman, great actress, great person. I really got to know her more when we did the movie."

== Themes ==
The main theme of Five on the Black Hand Side is liberation. As a new-style black comedy, it was the part of the Black Power movement.

Charlie L. Russell grew up in West Monroe, Louisiana, in the 1930s, where he witnessed many cases of racism. Together with his younger brother Bill Russell, the future Boston Celtics Hall-of-Famer, he experienced "harassment from local police, one of whom once ordered their mother to go home and remove the 'white woman' dress she was wearing, and threats from local businessmen, including a frightening moment at a gas station when the white owner held a shotgun to their father's face because he was going to leave rather than 'wait his turn' while one white customer after another was helped before him."

Russell then decided to write for an African-American audience and address black community problems. In an interview in 1973, he stated: "Yeah, I do, I write for a particular audience. I write primarily for black people, for a black audience. I write for, what I consider to be the workers, the masses of black people. I'm talking about, like, clerks, I'm talking about bus drivers, you know, working people. (...) There's a definite difference between what we call a black play and a white play and it all comes from the premise you start with, the premise of what reality is... I start from the premise that black people are oppressed in America... A black play must deal with this oppression in some way. In Five on the Black Hand Side I tried to do two things, and that was raise the level of consciousness and to unify black people."

In the movie, there is a generational gap depicted between Mr. Brooks and his children. Gideon, Gail, and Booker T. fight for African-American civil rights. They identify themselves as Africans. Gideon sings African songs in the shower and wants the family to move to Africa, Booker T. hates his "slave" name and likes to be introduced by an Arabic name "Sharif", and Gail is about to have an African wedding. Each one of them wears an afro and does not want to be a part of the system. Preston, a young barber, is also on their side and calls Mr. Brooks a “museum negro” for his conservative opinions.

The movie is about the women’s liberation movement and the civil rights movement going hand in hand. Joining the civil right movement along with her children and admitting her African roots give Mrs. Brooks strength to stand up to her husband. Despite this, her daughter Gail in the end of the movie enters into an unequal marriage, in which her husband is the head of the family.

== Women's liberation movement ==
Following the civil rights movement of the 1960s, the 1970s is known for women's liberation movement. Black women, though, had a hard time being recognized as freedom fighters in both women's liberation movement and Black Power movement.

The so called second wave feminists, according to Shelly Eversley and Michelle Habell-Pallán, fought to shape new standards "for thinking about gender, sexism, racism, sexuality, reproductive rights, religion, labor, colonialism, technology, art, music, and the environment".

In the 1970s African-American women also started to gain a louder voice in Black Power movement, which originally advised them to stay in the role of a mother and support black manhood.

In the beginning of the movie Five on the Black Hand Side, Mrs. Brooks does not seem to be able to stand up to her husband. When Mr. Brooks comes to the kitchen in the morning, she hands him a coffee right away while he does not even look at her. Mr. Brooks controls every second of Mrs. Brooks' life, saying controlling women is an art, and he even brags about it in his barbershop. He also blames his wife for not raising their children properly.

Showing how Black Power movement and women's liberation movement go hand in hand, recognizing her African roots gives Mrs. Brooks strength to stand up to her husband. With an afro and dressed like an "African queen", she invades her husband's barbershop, where women are not allowed, and hands him her list of demands yelling: "In the name of peace, self-determination and liberation, I demand that you sign mine list of demands. And they are non-negotiable!" Mrs. Brooks then joins her younger son in a civil rights movement waiting for her husband to accept the list of demands, otherwise she is determined to leave him.

== The symbol of a barbershop ==
Like in many other movies about the black community, a barbershop is a very important place for African-American men in Five on the Black Hand Side. Women are not allowed here. The barbershop is a symbol of John Henry's success: with his own business he supports his own family.

In an article "The Barbershop in Black Literature", Trudier Harris elaborates about the importance of the barbershops by saying that it is black men's second home, where they meet and talk, and the audience is always welcoming and friendly. Harris cited Joseph A. Pierce who stated that most of the barbershops look the same: "Joseph A. Pierce concludes of the 404 barbershops in 12 cities he studied that they fall in the fifty-three percent of black businesses that are located in secondary business areas—'Negro business centers almost without exception are located in these areas and are usually surrounded by large concentrations of Negro populations.' Two barber chairs are a standard feature in the usually rectangular room (small, 15 or 20 feet by 30 or 40 feet). Several straightback chairs or benches are placed along the walls for customers and noncustomers."

Opening hours of the barbershop are usually flexible due to the owner's and customer's needs. When the shop is closed without a notice, the customers are very understanding. Men can sit in on a bench for free, not standing in the way of the business. The barber welcomes the company when there are no customers. Due to Harris, "The barbershop allows for escape and retreat. (...) Barbershops in black literature also serve as public forums and information centers. They provide a setting for the discussion of political, social, and moral issues as well as the exchange of information."

Charlie L. Russell described the barbershop in Five on the Black Hand Side as a "Typical Harlem barbershop. There are two barber chairs, a jukebox, and several chairs for customers to sit in while they wait. There is a dryer, and a chair and a sink in the rear where facials are performed. There is also a closet in the rear of the shop. Pictures of famous theater and sports personalities hang on the walls."

Mrs. Brooks then invades this place so sacred to her husband Mr. Brooks and screams in his face, "In the name of peace, self-determination and liberation, I demand that you sign mine list of demands. And they are non-negotiable." As Harris wrote, "if the wife can invade this domain, and come out unharmed, she has a chance of changing John Henry's attitudes at home".

== Reception ==
After the movie's premier, A. H. Weiler wrote in The New York Times that Five on the Black Hand Side "is amiable but realistic in attempting only to solve a few problems for a middle-class black family. But by tickling the funny bone, Charlie L. Russell's adaptation of his Off Broadway play is a good deal more effective than most of the militant and violent so-called black films that are getting redundant."

Weiler continues, "Mr. Russell's script may be a basically lightweight affair, but he writes with an affection and keen perception that make his people and the issues, couched either in jive talk or straight dialogue, three dimensional and pertinent. Credit for the giggles and truths is also due Oscar Williams, who directed with professional feeling for pace and comedy."

Charlie L. Russell received several prizes for the screenplay. In 1975, he received NAACP Image Award for Best Film Script. In 1973, the Institute of International Education provided him with a grant to study African rituals and ceremonies in Nigeria for a period of three months. He also received a Rockefeller Playwright's Grant in 1975.

== Cast ==
- Clarice Taylor as Mrs. Gladys Ann Brooks
- Leonard Jackson as Mr. John Henry Brooks Jr.
- Virginia Capers as Ruby
- Glynn Turman as Gideon Brooks
- D'Urville Martin as Booker T. Washington Brooks
- Dick Anthony Williams as Preston (as Richard Williams)
- Sonny Jim Gaines as "Sweetmeat" (as Sonny Jim)
- Ja'net DuBois as "Stormy" Monday
- Bonnie Banfield as Gail Brooks
- Carl Franklin as Marvin
- Dick Anthony Williams as Preston
- Godfrey Cambridge as himself

== See also ==
- List of American films of 1973
