= Michelle Beck =

American actress based in New York City

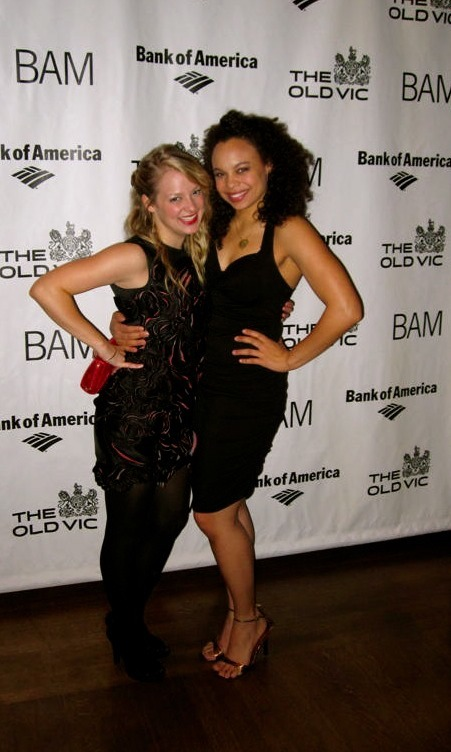
- Michelle Beck (right) with Jenni Barber at Brooklyn Academy of Music.
- Born: Billings, Montana, U.S.
- Education: State University of New York at Purchase (BFA)
- Occupation: Actress
- Years active: 2007–present

Michelle Beck is an American actress based in New York City known for her performances in Shakespeare plays and other stage works. She has also appeared in film and television.

== Early life and education ==
Born in Billings, Montana, Beck was raised in Charleston, South Carolina, and studied acting at the South Carolina Governor's School for the Arts & Humanities. She continued her university training at the State University of New York at Purchase Acting Conservatory, where she graduated magna cum laude with a BFA in acting.

== Career ==
Beck began her career at the Oregon Shakespeare Festival, where she performed in The Winter's Tale and as Roxane in Cyrano de Bergerac. She appeared as Sasha in Spinning into Butter (2007), a film about racism starring Sarah Jessica Parker.

Beck first garnered attention in 2007 as Ophelia in Hamlet at the Shakespeare Theatre Company in Washington, D.C., directed by Michael Kahn. Later that year, she worked with director Daniel Fish, playing Marianne in his Tartuffe at the McCarter Theater and Yale Repertory Theater. In 2009, Beck appeared as Viola in a Chicago Shakespeare Theater production of Twelfth Night, directed by Josie Rourke. In 2008, she reprised her role as Ophelia in Hamlet.

Beck next appeared in The Bridge Project, a joint venture between the Brooklyn Academy of Music in New York City and The Old Vic Theater in London, directed by Sam Mendes. Beck played Celia in As You Like It and Ceres in The Tempest (both in 2010). She also appeared in Shakespeare productions at The Public Theater, including Karin Coonrod's production of Love's Labour's Lost as Lady Katharine (2011) and Amanda Dehnert's Richard III as Lady Anne (2012). She played Hero in the Theatre for a New Audience's production of "Much Ado About Nothing", directed by Arin Arbus (2013).

Beck also appeared as the nurse in the 2013 LCT3 production of "A Kid Like Jake", written by Daniel Pearle and directed by Evan Cabnet at the Claire Tow Theater in Lincoln Center. Beck worked on the 2014 Broadway revival of A Raisin in the Sun at the Ethel Barrymore Theatre, starring Denzel Washington and directed by Kenny Leon, as the understudy for Beneatha. At The Pearl Theatre Company in 2014, in Uncle Vanya, a reviewer wrote: "Beck steals the show as Sonya, revealing her to be the most intelligent and sensible character in the play. She's the glue holding this house together" With Epic Theater Ensemble and National Black Theater in 2015, she played Isabella in Measure for Measure. She also played Kelly in The Sentinels by Matthew Lopez at 59E59 Theaters.

In 2014, she played Hayden in a short film adaptation of The Third Option. She played Julia in, and co-directed, the independent film Sam & Julia (2015). Her television credits include Madam Secretary and Homeland (2015).

== Filmography ==
=== Film ===
Year	Title	Role	Notes
2007	Spinning into Butter	Sasha	
2017	Ambition's Debt	Antony's Servant	

=== Television ===
Year	Title	Role	Notes
2015	Madam Secretary	Paramedic	Episode: "Face the Nation"
2015	Homeland	ICU Nurse #1	Episode: "A False Glimmer"
2018	Luke Cage	Drea Powell	3 episodes
2020	Manifest	ADA Wilcox	Episode: "False Horizon"
2021–2022	Power Book II: Ghost	Camille	4 episodes
