= Sade Lythcott =

American theater manager and producer

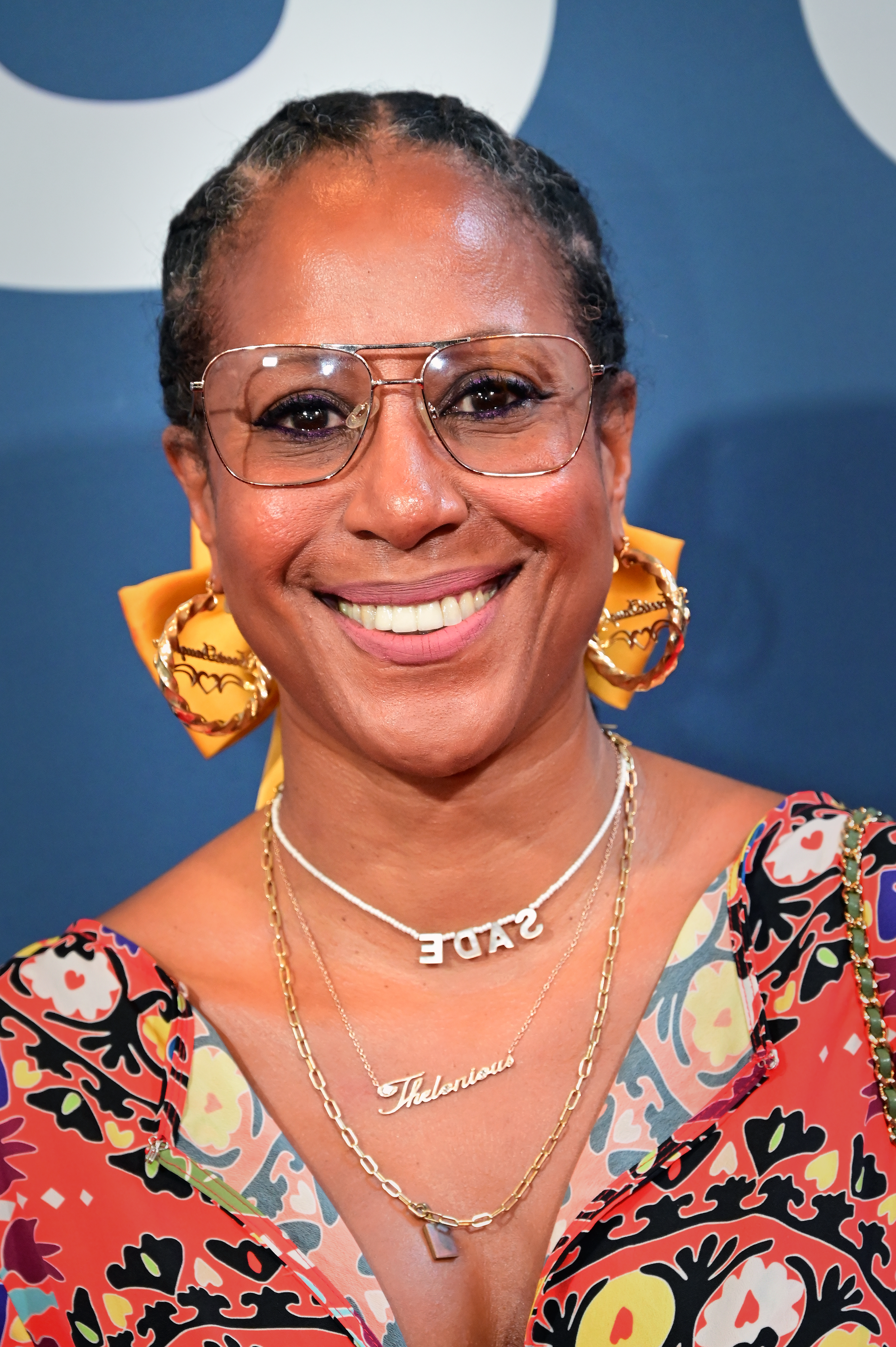
- Lythcott in 2026

Sade Lythcott is CEO of the National Black Theater in Harlem and the daughter of theater founder Barbara Ann Teer. Lythcott took on the role in 2008 and remains in the role as of 2024 despite it initially being a six-month, interim role. As of 2019, she also served as chair of the Coalition of Theatres of Color and during the COVID-19 pandemic was a co-leader of the Culture at 3 calls.

Lythcott is an NYU alumni with a bachelor's degree in art history and occasional actor who has also worked in fashion and broadcasting. As a producer, she has been nominated for both an Emmy and a Tony Award.
