= Black theatre =

Black theatre or black theater may refer to:

- Black light theatre, a staging concept using black backgrounds and black light
- Black Theatre (Sydney), an Australian Aboriginal theatre company 1972–1977
- African-American musical theater, prominent especially in New York City
- Black Theater, a 1973 spoken word record
