= Clarice Taylor =

American actress (1917–2011)

- Born: September 20, 1917; Buckingham County, Virginia, U.S.
- Died: May 30, 2011 (aged 93); Englewood, New Jersey, U.S.
- Occupations: Stage, television, film actress
- Years active: 1960–2009
- Children: 2

Clarice Taylor (September 20, 1917 – May 30, 2011) was an American stage, film and television actress. She is best known for playing Cousin Emma on Sanford and Son; Anna Huxtable, the mother of Cliff Huxtable, on The Cosby Show; and Mrs. Brooks in Five on the Black Hand Side (1973).

== Biography ==
Born in Buckingham County, Virginia but raised in Harlem, New York, Taylor was best known for her recurring role on television on The Cosby Show as Anna Huxtable, mother to Bill Cosby's character Cliff Huxtable. She was nominated for an Emmy Award in 1986 for the role. She was also a regular on The Doctors in 1968 playing Hope Stark, Nurse as Nurse Baily, recurred on Sesame Street over a thirteen year period as David's grandmother Grace, and appeared as Grady's cousin Emma on Sanford and Son.

Taylor started working in the theatre—with the American Negro Theatre—at a time when there were few opportunities for African-American actors and comedians. To support herself she followed in the footsteps of her father, Leon B. Taylor, Sr., and went to work for the U.S. Post Office. In the 1960s she got her big break that enabled her to act full-time. Taylor was one of the founding members of the Negro Ensemble Company, headquartered in New York's East Village on St. Mark's Place.

== Film and television work ==
While working with the NEC she got her first offer of a movie role in Change of Mind (1969). Her next film role was as Minnie in Otto Preminger's Tell Me That You Love Me, Junie Moon (1970). In 1971, she played Birdie in Clint Eastwood's Play Misty For Me, and appeared as Mrs McKay in Such Good Friends the same year.

In 1973, she brought a role she had pioneered off-Broadway to film, playing Gladys Brooks in Five on the Black Hand Side. Her later films included Nothing Lasts Forever (1984), Sommersby (1993), and Smoke (1995). Two of her most well-known recurring characters in television were in Sanford & Son (1972), where she played Cousin Emma, and The Cosby Show (1984), where she played Anna Huxtable, Cliff's mother.

== Stage ==
Taylor appeared in The Wiz as Addaperle, the Good Witch of the North, and in Purlie the Broadway play as Idella Landy. Her most recent performance was in a touring production of her one-woman show Moms, for which she won an Obie Award in 1987 for Best Performance by an Actress. Her last film appearance was a small role in Wayne Wang's film Smoke.

== Death ==
Clarice Taylor died in Englewood, New Jersey from congestive heart failure, aged 93. She is survived by her two adopted sons, William and James Thomas, and extended family.

== Partial filmography ==
- The New Girl in the Office (1960)
- Change of Mind (1969) - Rose Landis
- Tell Me That You Love Me, Junie Moon (1970) - Minnie
- Play Misty For Me (1971) - Birdie
- Such Good Friends (1971) - Mrs. McKay
- Five on the Black Hand Side (1973) - Mrs. Brooks
- The Torture of Mothers (1980)
- Nothing Lasts Forever (1984) - Lu
- Sommersby (1993) - Esther
- Smoke (1995) - Grandma Ethel

== See also ==
- List of human characters in Sesame Street
