= Cultural Institutions Group =

Coalition of institutions in New York City

The Cultural Institutions Group (CIG) is a coalition of institutions providing cultural and educational resources to the public in New York City that are subsidized by the city government. The group originated with the new location for the American Museum of Natural History in 1869, and as of 2025, the CIG includes 39 cultural institutions.

In the decades following the new facility for AMNH, the structure was formalized wherein New York City would provide funds for security and maintenance of the museum's physical property, while a private (generally non profit) organization would develop and maintain the museum's content and programs. By 1900, the Brooklyn Museum, Brooklyn Children's Museum, the Met, New York Botanical Garden and the Wildlife Conservation Society had joined the CIGs. The newest addition to the group is Weeksville Heritage Center, which was added in 2019. It was the first new addition in twenty years, and Brooklyn's first Black cultural center to be designated.

The organizations that comprise CIG are on city owned land and receive funding in a different manner than other cultural organizations in New York City. A city owned location does not guarantee funding, with the Seaport Museum a notable exception as of 2000. The relationship with the city is predominantly through the Department of Cultural Affairs. While the designation does not give the city a say over the museum's content, friction sometimes does arise such as with the Brooklyn Museum's 1999 show, Sensation which led to then mayor Rudy Giuliani threatening the museum's funding and location.

Among the initiatives of the group are the Culture at 3 call, launched in 2020 amid the COVID-19 pandemic, and NYC ID, which launched in 2014 to provide free and discounted access to the museums for NYC residents. In 2019, the Museum of the City of New York was home to an exhibit about the CIGs on occasion of the 150th anniversary of the coalition.

== Member organizations ==
- American Museum of Natural History
- Bronx Children's Museum
- The Bronx County Historical Society
- The Bronx Museum of the Arts
- BRIC Arts Media
- Brooklyn Academy of Music
- Brooklyn Botanic Garden
- Brooklyn Children's Museum
- Brooklyn Museum
- Carnegie Hall
- Flushing Town Hall
- Jamaica Center for Arts & Learning
- Lincoln Center for the Performing Arts
- Louis Armstrong House
- The Metropolitan Museum of Art
- MoMA PS1 Contemporary Art Center
- El Museo del Barrio
- Museum of Jewish Heritage
- Museum of the City of New York
- Museum of the Moving Image
- The New York Botanical Garden
- New York City Center
- New York Hall of Science
- The New York Public Theater
- New York State Theater:
  - New York City Ballet
  - New York City Opera
- Noble Maritime Collection
- Pregones/Puerto Rican Traveling Theater
- Queens Botanical Garden
- Queens Museum of Art
- Queens Theatre in the Park
- Snug Harbor Cultural Center
- Staten Island Botanical Garden
- Staten Island Children's Museum
- Staten Island Historical Society
- Staten Island Museum
- Staten Island Zoological Society
- The Studio Museum in Harlem
- Wave Hill
- Weeksville Heritage Center
- Wildlife Conservation Society:
  - Bronx Zoo
  - New York Aquarium
