= Coalition of Theatres of Color =

The Coalition of Theatres of Color launched in 2004 to address funding and visibility inequity among theaters of color. Two key founding figures were Ossie Davis and Ruby Dee and the inaugural groups comprised twelve ethnically specific, multicultural theatrical and cultural institutions that were more than twenty five years old but whose budgets were less than $250,000 per year. The organizers worked to achieve annual funding for the collective via the New York City Council, although funding disparities continued into the 2020s.

== Members ==
As of 2016, the member organizations included the following:

- AUDELCO
- Black Spectrum Theatre
- Billie Holiday Theatre
- Mind-Builders Creative Arts Center
- National Black Theatre
- The Negro Ensemble Company
- INTAR Theatre
- Ma-Yi Theater Company
- New Federal Theatre
- New Heritage Theatre Group
- Pan Asian Repertory Theatre
