= Ja'Net DuBois =

American actress (d. 2020)

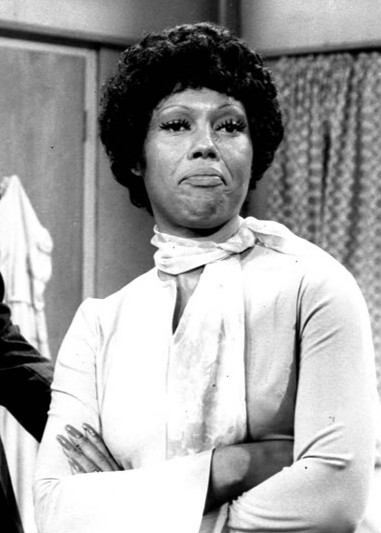
- DuBois as Willona Woods on the television series Good Times, 1976
- Born: Jeannette Theresa Dubois; August 5 Philadelphia, Pennsylvania, U.S.
- Died: February 17, 2020; Glendale, California, U.S.
- Occupations: Actress; singer
- Years active: 1960–2019
- Known for: Willona Woods – Good Times; Ma Bell – I'm Gonna Git You Sucka; Ms. Avery – The PJs
- Spouse(s): Sajit Gupta (m. 1950–?; divorced)
- Children: 4

Jeannette Theresa Dubois (August 5 (Note: DuBois' year of birth is disputed. Sources state 1938 and 1945 as years of birth.) – February 17, 2020), known professionally as Ja'Net DuBois, Ja'net DuBois, and Ja'Net Du Bois (Note: Capitalization of "n" in first name is uncertain in Good Times title card, which credits her in capital letters "JA'NET du BOIS". Last name is given as two words, with "du" lowercase.) (/dʒəˈneɪ duːˈbwɑː/), was an American actress and singer. She was best known for her portrayal of Willona Woods, the neighborhood gossip maven and a friend of the Evans family on the CBS sitcom Good Times, which aired from 1974 to 1979. DuBois additionally cowrote and sang the theme song "Movin' On Up" for The Jeffersons, which aired from 1975 until 1985. After beginning her career on the stage in the early 1960s, DuBois appeared on television shows and in films into the mid-2010s. She won two Emmy Awards for her voiceover work on the animated program The PJs.

== Biography ==
=== Early life and career ===
DuBois was born Jeannette Theresa Dubois in Philadelphia, Pennsylvania. She was the daughter of Lillian Gouedy (1910–1984) and Gordon Adelbert Dubois (1915–1960) and was raised in Amityville, New York, on Long Island.

In the early 1960s, DuBois moved to Brooklyn and began her acting career onstage, making her Broadway debut with a small role in the short-lived play The Long Dream, which ran for four days in February 1960. She appeared in the drama A Raisin in the Sun with Louis Gossett Jr., though not the original Broadway production. After appearing in the play The Blacks in October 1963, she became an understudy for the housekeeper role, portrayed by Gertrude Jeannette, in the comedy Nobody Loves an Albatross, which ran through June 1964. DuBois next appeared in the Broadway musical Golden Boy with Sammy Davis Jr., Billy Daniels, Lola Falana and Johnny Brown. DuBois portrayed Anna, the sister of Davis's character, through the entire original run from October 1964 to March 1966.

=== Career ===
DuBois's early television acting credits include the 1969 television film J.T. and as Loretta Allen on the soap opera Love of Life from 1970 until 1972, becoming one of the first African-American female regular cast members on a daytime series. DuBois's first film appearance was her portrayal of Vera in Diary of a Mad Housewife (1970). She landed the role of Stormy Monday in the 1973 comedy Five on the Black Hand Side and appeared in Lanford Wilson's play The Hot l Baltimore that same year.

During her time in the play, television producer Norman Lear watched DuBois on stage at the Mark Taper Forum and was impressed with her performance. He cast her in his CBS sitcom Good Times as Wilona Woods, the Evanses' neighbor and best friend of family matriarch Florida Evans, portrayed by Esther Rolle. DuBois appeared in the show from February 1974 until the show ended in August 1979. DuBois began the show as a costar alongside Rolle and John Amos (who departed the show in 1976). In 1977, DuBois's role became more prominent during the fifth season after Rolle had left the cast. DuBois returned to her costarring role when Rolle returned in the sixth and final season in 1978.

After Good Times ended in 1979, DuBois recorded the album Again, Ja'Net DuBois on her Peanuts and Caviar label in 1983. She appeared in former Good Times co-star Janet Jackson's 1987 "Control" music video as her mother. In 1992, she costarred with Clifton Davis in And I Still Rise, a play written and directed by Maya Angelou. DuBois co-starred in the films I'm Gonna Git You Sucka (1988) and Charlie's Angels: Full Throttle (2003), and on television in Moesha, The Steve Harvey Show, A Different World, Touched by an Angel and The Wayans Bros.

=== Other ventures and accolades ===
During the 1980s, DuBois operated the Ja'net DuBois Academy of Theater Arts and Sciences, a performing arts school for teenagers on Long Island, New York. In 1992, DuBois, Danny Glover and Ayuko Babu cofounded the Pan African Film & Arts Festival in Los Angeles. In 1995, DuBois won a CableACE award for Best Supporting Actress for her role in the Lifetime film Other Women's Children. DuBois won Emmy Awards for her voiceover work on the animated program The PJs in 1999 and 2001. DuBois, along with the other cast members of Good Times, received the Impact Icon Award at the 2006 TV Land Awards. In 2000, DuBois served as grand marshal for the North Amityville Community Parade and Festival Day in Amityville, New York.

== Personal life ==
DuBois married Sajit Gupta in 1950. According to her Brazilian consular document, DuBois was divorced from Gupta by April 1959, but another source states that she was still married in 1964. Together, DuBois and Gupta had four children: Provat Gupta, Rani Gupta, Kesha Gupta-Fields and Raj Kristo Gupta, who died of cancer in 1987 at age 36. Provat is a basketball coach based in California. In 1959, DuBois was romantically involved with actor Brock Peters.

== Death ==
DuBois died on February 17, 2020, of cardiac arrest at her residence in Glendale, California.

== Discography ==
- Movin' On Up (theme from The Jeffersons, 1975)
- Queen of the Highway (Som Livre, 1980)
- Again, Ja'Net DuBois (Peanuts & Caviar Internationale, 1983)
- Hidden Treasures (Peanuts & Caviar Internationale, 2007)

== Filmography ==
=== Film ===
Year	Title	Role	Notes
1966	A Man Called Adam	Martha	
1969	J.T.	Rodeen Gamble	Television film
1973	Five on the Black Hand Side	Stormy Monday	
1973	The Blue Knight	Celia Louise	Television film
1977	A Piece of the Action	Nellie Bond	
1981	Hellinger's Law	Dottie Singer	Television film
1983	The Tom Swift and Linda Craig Mystery Hour	Mrs. Gorman	Television film
1986	Stranded	Bettina	Television film
1987	Kids Like These	Mrs. Page	Television film
1988	I'm Gonna Git You Sucka	Ma Bell	
1990	Heart Condition	Mrs. Stone	
1990	Hammer, Slammer, & Slade	Joanne Wilson	Television film
1990	Penny Ante: The Motion Picture	Aunt	
1993	Harlan & Merleen	Maxine	Television film
1995	Magic Island	Lucretia	
1996	Sophie & the Moonhanger	Agnes	Television film
1996	Don't Look Back	Mrs. Lawson	Television film
1998	Best Friends for Life	Katie Pegues	Television film
1998	Hard Time	Lefty	Television film
1999	Hard Time: Hostage Hotel	Lefty, Logan's Assistant	Television film
2000	Waterproof	Viola Battle	
2003	Charlie's Angels: Full Throttle	Momma Bosley	
2016	She's Got a Plan	Betty Angelo	

=== Television ===
Year(s)	Title	Role	Notes
1970–72	Love of Life	Loretta Allen	unknown episodes
1972	Sanford and Son	Juanita Grismore	1 episode
1973	Shaft	Diana Richie	1 episode
1974–79	Good Times	Willona Woods	133 episodes
1974	Kojak	Paula Thomas	1 episode
1975	Caribe	Melinda Jameson	1 episode
1979	Roots: The Next Generations	Sally Harvey	1 episode
1980	The Love Boat	Evelyn Hopkins	1 episode
1981	The Facts of Life	Ethel	1 episode
1981	The Sophisticated Gents	Onetha Wiggins	TV miniseries
1989	Nearly Departed	Clerk	1 episode
1990	New Attitude	Irma	1 episode
1990	Doctor Doctor	Ella Wilkes	1 episode
1991	A Different World	Brenda Hanes	1 episode
1991	True Colors	May Freeman	1 episode
1991	Dream On	June	1 episode
1992	Beverly Hills, 90210	Arlene	1 episode
1992–93	The Golden Palace	Louise Wilson	2 episodes
1994	Sister, Sister	Mom O'Danielle	1 episode
1994	Hangin' with Mr. Cooper	Dorothy Cooper	1 episode
1995	Martin	Herself	1 episode
1991/1995	Home Improvement	Carol	2 episodes
1995	ER	Macy Chamberlain	1 episode
1997	Moesha	Mrs. Moss	1 episode
1997	Touched by an Angel	Esther Hamilton	1 episode
1996–1998	The Wayans Bros.	Grandma Ellington/Willona Woods	11 episodes
1999	Clueless	Aunt Liddy	1 episode
1999–2001	The PJs	Mrs. Florence Avery	Voice, 43 episodes
2000	The Steve Harvey Show	Delores	1 episode
2000	Everybody Loves Raymond	Dottie	1 episode
2000/2002	As Told by Ginger	Mrs. Patterson	Voice, 2 episodes
2003	Boomtown	Denise Smith	1 episode
2003	One on One	Queen Esther	1 episode
2006	Crossing Jordan	Mrs. Jones	1 episode
2007	Random! Cartoons	Mom	Voice, episode: "Samsquatch"
2007	Cold Case	Edna Johnson	1 episode
2011	G.I. Joe: Renegades	Grams Hinton	Voice
2019	Live in Front of a Studio Audience	Herself	Episode: "All in the Family and Good Times"

== Awards and nominations ==
Year	Award	Category	Series	Result
1998	NAACP Image Award	Outstanding Supporting Actress in a Drama Series	Touched by an Angel	Nominated
1999	Primetime Emmy	Outstanding Voice-Over Performance	The PJs	Won
2001	Primetime Emmy	Outstanding Voice-Over Performance	The PJs: Let's Get Ready to Rumba	Won
2006	TV Land	Image Award	Good Times	Won
