= Black Drama =

1973 spoken word album

Studio album by Barbara Ann Teer and Charlie L. Russell
- Released: January 1, 1973
- Genre: Spoken word
- Length: 33:08
- Label: Smithsonian Folkways
- Producer: Nathan W. Garner

Black Drama, sometimes referred to as Black Theater, is a two-track American spoken word record featuring two autobiographical accounts from Barbara Ann Teer and Charlie L. Russell, both leading African American figures in live theater during the 1970s. It was distributed by Smithsonian Folkways Recordings in 1973 and details their individual rises to significance in the live theatre scene of the time. It was issued via LP record on January 1, 1973. A cassette tape release of the recording was issued in 1994.

These recordings lived in relative obscurity until a segment of Teer's account was sampled by American singer Beyoncé on her 2022 song "Alien Superstar."

== Overview ==
Black Theatre has become, during the 1970's, one of the most popular expressions of black culture. Playwrights, directors and actors are interpreting black culture for audiences all over the country.

This new exposure of black drama is significant for it acts as a counterpoint to the many poorly made and exploitive movies which purport to express the only thing of value and interest in black life. The black playwrights and directors are powerful and true voices that must be heard.

On this recording, Folkways records brings to the listener the wisdom of two leading black artists - Barbara Ann Teer, Founder and Director of the National Black Theatre and Charlie L. Russell, a playwright whose work incorporates humor, political consciousness and for real black characters.

—Nathan W. Garner in the LP release's liner notes.

Russell describes his personal journey to playwriting and his experiences navigating the theatrical world as a Black artist. He talks about the part that Black theatre played in the civil rights movement and expresses his views on the value of producing art that speaks to the experiences of underrepresented groups.

Teer discusses her personal story of growing up in a home that appreciated the arts and her journey to becoming a prominent Black theatre performer. She talks about the difficulties she had as a Black woman working in a largely White field and explains formulating her idea for the National Black Theatre in which she eventually founded, a venue for Black artists to exhibit their work and express their cultural identity.

== Track listing ==
Side A

1. "Black Theater" (Charles Russell) – 12:26

Side B

1. "Black Theater" (Barbara Ann Teer) – 20:42

== Personnel ==
- Charlie L. Russell – playwright (track 1)
- Barbara Ann Teer – founder of National Black Theatre (track 2)
- Nathan W. Garner - Producer, Liner Notes
- Ronald Clyne - Designer
