= Lucy Sexton =

American performer, director and choreographer

Lucy Sexton is an American performer, director, choreographer and magazine editor who performs as Factress, and is one half of Dancenoise.

She is a Bessie Award winner, and later served as the organization's executive director before stepping down in 2020. As of 2014, she was associate artistic director at the World Trade Center Performing Arts Center. As of 2020, she's Executive Director of New Yorkers For Culture and the Arts under which she co-leads the Culture at 3 calls.

Sexton has a child with her husband Stephen Daldry and is a 1982 graduate of Ohio University.
