= I'm Gonna Git You Sucka =

1988 film by Keenen Ivory Wayans

- Theatrical release poster
- Directed by: Keenen Ivory Wayans
- Written by: Keenen Ivory Wayans
- Produced by: Eric L. Gold; Raymond Katz
- Starring: Keenen Ivory Wayans; Bernie Casey; Antonio Fargas; Isaac Hayes; Jim Brown; Ja'net Dubois
- Cinematography: Tom Richmond
- Edited by: Michael R. Miller
- Music by: David Michael Frank
- Production companies: United Artists; Front Films; Ivory Way Productions; Raymond Katz Productions
- Distributed by: MGM/UA Communications Co.
- Release date: December 14, 1988 (United States)
- Running time: 89 minutes
- Country: United States
- Language: English
- Budget: $3 million
- Box office: $13 million

I'm Gonna Git You Sucka is a 1988 American blaxploitation parody film written, directed by and starring Keenen Ivory Wayans in his directorial debut. Featured in the film are several noteworthy African-American actors who were part of the genre of blaxploitation: Jim Brown, Bernie Casey, Antonio Fargas and Isaac Hayes. It co-stars John Vernon, Kadeem Hardison, Ja'net Dubois, John Witherspoon, Damon Wayans, Clarence Williams III, Dawnn Lewis, Shawn Wayans, Marlon Wayans, and Chris Rock, and acts as the film debut of comedian Robin Harris.

The film entered a limited theatrical release on December 14, 1988, before expanding to a wide release on January 11, 1989. It was commercially successful, grossing $13 million, and received mixed reviews from critics.

== Plot ==
When soldier Jack Spade learns that his brother Junebug overdosed on gold chains and died, he returns to Any Ghetto, U.S.A, where he is met by his mother and sister-in-law, Cheryl. As he surveys the old neighborhood, Jack notices the impact that gold chains have had on his neighborhood and feels that not only should his brother's death be made right, but the entire neighborhood as well. He vows to destroy Mr. Big, the neighborhood chain lord responsible for the epidemic that claimed Junebug's life.

Jack asks for the aid of his childhood idol and local hero John Slade in planning the demise of Mr. Big's empire. Together, they form a team including Kung Fu Joe, Flyguy, Slammer, and Hammer. Mr. Big sets out to cut down the team in retaliation, which results in a variety of calamity befalling the group; Kung Fu Joe is shot over and over again by police officers while Hammer, armed to the teeth, slips on a bullet and accidentally shoots himself repeatedly. Cheryl is kidnapped by the criminals while John is blown up when slowly approaching the window in the raid. Slammer is shot in the foot that seemingly leaves only Jack to take on the gang (when approached by his mother with a shotgun, he elects to lock her in the closet). Eventually, Jack meets Mr. Big, who is shot by a still-smoldering John that leads to the end of the gold trade in the streets while both Cheryl and Jack and John and Belle embrace each other.

== Cast ==
- Keenen Ivory Wayans as Jack Spade
- Bernie Casey as John Slade
- Ja'Net DuBois as Belle Brown-Spade
- Isaac Hayes as "Hammer"
- Jim Brown as "Slammer"
- Antonio Fargas as Flyguy
- Steve James as Joe "Kung Fu Joe"
- John Vernon as "Mr. Big"
- Dawnn Lewis as Cheryl Spade
- Kadeem Hardison as Willie
- Damon Wayans as Leonard
- Kim Wayans as Nightclub Singer
- Nadia Wayans as Bar Patron
- Chris Rock as Rib Joint Customer
- Anne-Marie Johnson as "Cherry"
- Eve Plumb as Kalinga's Wife
- Tony Cox as Wayne Evans
- Hawthorne James as Sam "One-Eyed Sam"
- Clarence Williams III as Kalinga
- David Alan Grier as Newsman
- Robin Harris as The Bartender
- Marlon Wayans and Shawn Wayans as Pedestrians
- Gary Owens as Pimp of the Year Pageant Announcer
- Michael Conn as Officer
- Ariana Richards as Little Girl
- John Witherspoon as Reverend
- Lawrence Parker as himself
- Derrick Jones as himself
- Robert Townsend (uncredited)
- Peggy Lipton (uncredited)
- Clu Gulager as Lieutenant Baker

== Background ==
The film was written and directed by first-time director Keenan Ivory Wayans. The inspiration behind the film came from Wayans, who is a fan of blaxploitation films, and his childhood spent growing up watching these films as they made up the majority of black films made during the 1970s. Sitting with friends and making fun of the genre struck the idea for the film in Wayans. Before making I’m Gonna Git You Sucka, Wayans spent five years earning credentials for films such as Hollywood Shuffle and Eddie Murphy Raw. Eddie Murphy suggested the concept of a blaxploitation parody and its title. Once Wayans earned enough credibility to have his film picked up by a studio and a budget of $3 million, Wayans filmed his debut feature film in 32 days. It grossed a total of $3 million in the box office in the first month of the film's release.

== Critical reception ==
I'm Gonna Git You Sucka has an approval rating of 65% on Rotten Tomatoes from 31 reviews. The site's critical consensus reads "I'm Gonna Git You Sucka puts a satirical spin on '70s nostalgia with a comedy whose somewhat scattershot laughs are often offset by pure energetic silliness."

I’m Gonna Git You Sucka received critical receptions that were wide-ranging and numerous in viewpoint. The film opened to rave responses from the black community, who felt the film captured the era of blaxploitation films from the 1970s. Black audience members were thrilled to attend the screening of a movie filled with black actors about a black film genre. Critics also noted Wayans’ ability to satirically capture the trope of the "Buck" in blaxploitation film: the white man's notion of the all-powerful brutal black man.

In her analysis of the film, Harriet Margolis wrote that this is not because "[Jack] consciously chooses to reject his mother’s values as that he wants to establish his own based on the macho heroic values he learned during the heyday of blaxploitation films."

Historian Robert Sklar wrote, "The [blaxploitation film] movement quickly developed into a phenomenon not of an African-American audience but of a specific subgroup, a segment of a segment: young urban males,” so often the perspective and narratives of young black women were left out or included as the background in many of these films during the 1970s.

Critics of the film argued that the film not only failed at producing humor in its use of black stereotypes, but generally was not funny. Chicago Sun-Times film critic Roger Ebert wrote I’m Gonna Git You Sucka is "a comedy that feeds off the blaxploitation movie, and although, like all good satires, it is cheerfully willing to be offensive, it is almost completely incapable of being funny." There was also a concern about the perception of the film from white moviegoing audiences. The film's villain, Mr. Big, is not only a white man, but a white man responsible for the deterioration of an inner city black community.

== Television pilot ==
On December 15, 1990, the hour-long television pilot titled Hammer, Slammer, & Slade was shown on ABC-TV. It was directed by Michael Schultz.

Isaac Hayes (Hammer), Jim Brown (Slammer), and Bernie Casey (Slade) continued in their parts from the movie I'm Gonna Git You Sucka. Also returning were Ja'Net DuBois and Steve James. Although Keenen Ivory Wayans wrote the pilot, and he served as the executive producer, he did not appear in this pilot. Instead, the character of Jack Spade was portrayed by Eriq La Salle. Fast-talking Lennie, played by Damon Wayans in the film, was played by Bentley Kyle Evans, while his sidekick Willie, played by Kadeem Hardison in the film, was played by a then-unknown Martin Lawrence.

Hammer, Slammer, & Slade was not sold to any TV network, but it was shown several times in syndication.

== Home media ==
In 2001, I'm Gonna Git You Sucka was released on DVD and in 2010, it was digitized in High Definition (1080i) and released on MGM HD. In 2016, Kino Lorber released the film on Blu-ray.

== Music ==
- "I'm Gonna Git You Sucka" – The Gap Band
- "If Ever a Love There Was" – Four Tops featuring Aretha Franklin
- "Clean Up Your Act" – Jermaine Jackson
- "Magic Man" – Jennifer Holliday
- "He's a Flyguy" – Curtis Mayfield featuring Fishbone
- "This Beat Is Military" – K-9 Posse
- "Two Can Play the Game" – Too Nice
- "Jack of Spades" – Boogie Down Productions
- "You're So Cute" – The Gap Band
- "Grazing in the Grass" – The Friends of Distinction

== See also ==
- Hollywood Shuffle (1987)
- Black Dynamite (2009)
