= Dan Cohen (academic) =

American historian

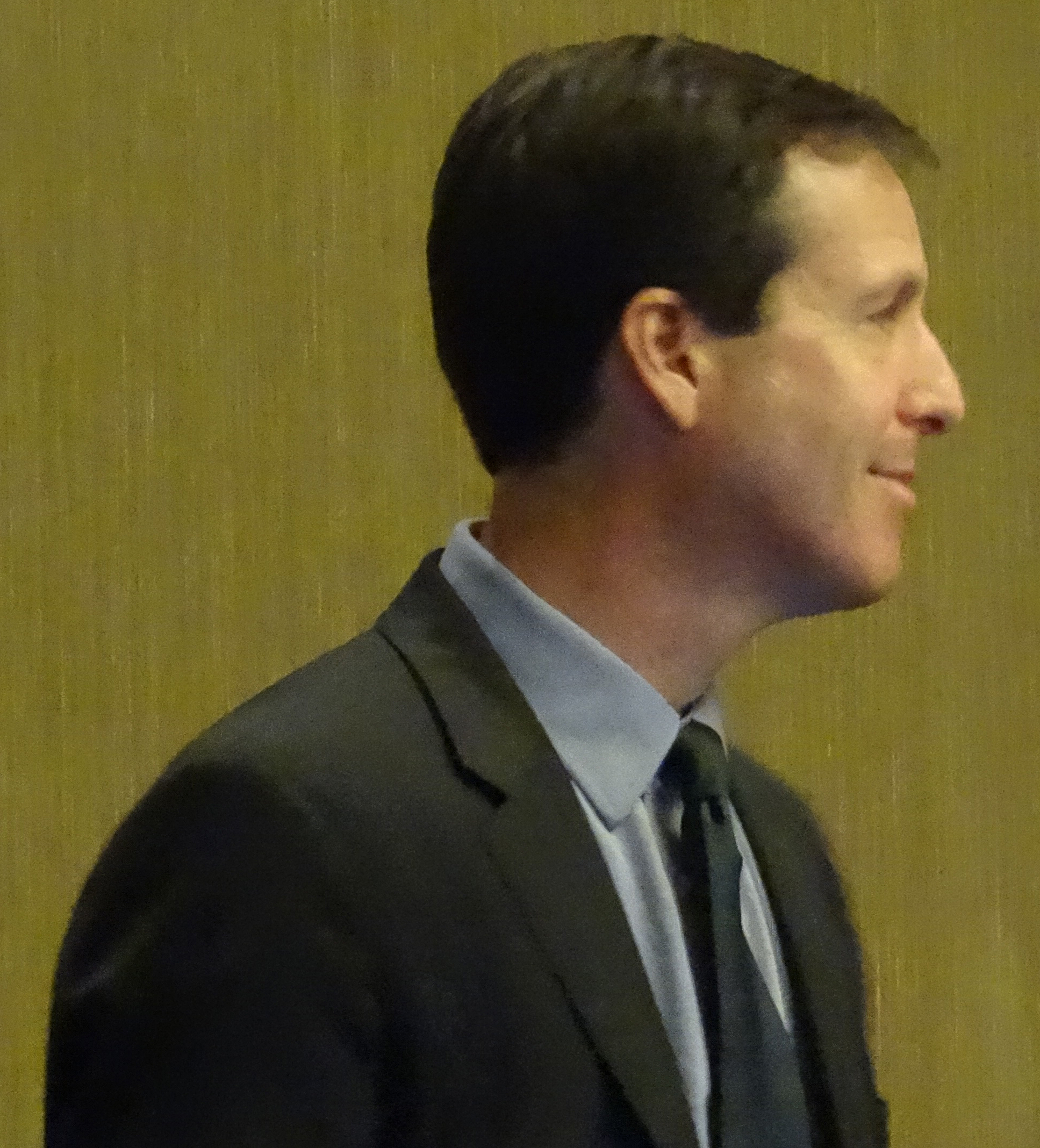
- Cohen in 2014
- Born: Daniel J. Cohen
- Occupation: Historian

Academic background
- Education: Princeton University; Harvard University; Yale University

Daniel J. Cohen is an American historian. As of June 1, 2017, he is serving as dean of libraries and vice provost for information collaboration at Northeastern University. He was the Founding Executive Director of the Digital Public Library of America (DPLA). He was the director of the Roy Rosenzweig Center for History and New Media for 12 years, until leaving his position for the DPLA in 2013. His research work has focused around digital history and abstract mathematics being used in Victorian society to explain spirituality. In 2012 he was named one of the Chronicle for Higher Education's Tech Innovators.

He was raised in the Boston area. As a teenager he was named one of the 20 best high school students in New England. He participated in the International Math Olympiad in 1985. Cohen earned his bachelor's degree in religion from Princeton University, his master's degree in the history of religion in the Modern West from Harvard University, and his doctorate in history from Yale University. He studied math while he was at Princeton. He started working for Roy Rosenzweig in 2001. He is a contributing writer to The Atlantic and Wired.

== Bibliography ==
- Cohen, Daniel J. and Roy Rosenzweig. "Digital History: A Guide to Gathering, Preserving, and Presenting the Past on the Web". Philadelphia: University of Pennsylvania Press (2005). ISBN 0812219236
- Cohen, Daniel J. Equations from God: Pure Mathematics and Victorian Faith. Baltimore: Johns Hopkins University Press (2007). ISBN 0801885531
