= Kathryn Petralia =

American entrepreneur

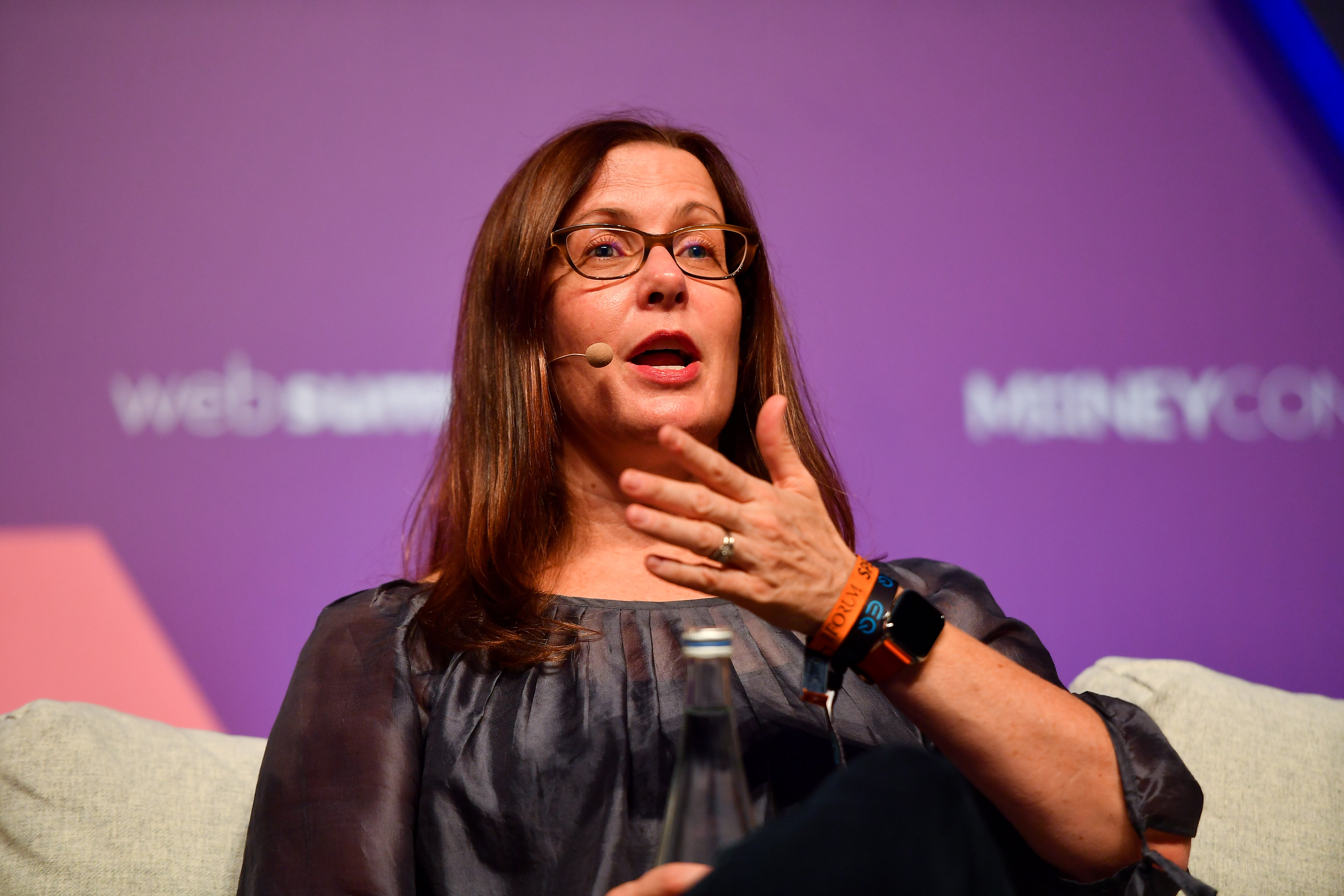
Petralia in 2018

Kathryn Petralia is an American entrepreneur who is the co-founder and COO of Kabbage.

In November 2017, Forbes said that she was the 98th most powerful woman in the world. In December 2017, she was listed as 1 of 42 women a list of successful women in technology in TechCrunch.

== Early life ==
Kathryn Petralia was born on August 17, 1970. At nine, she was given a TRS-80 computer by her parents and she developed an interest in technology. She was an English major and earned a B.A. degree in English literature from Furman University in Greenville, South Carolina.

== Career ==
=== Startups ===
Beginning in the early 1990s, she began working at companies focused on "technology, payments and e-commerce." She became involved in "alternative lending" in the late 1990s. She also launched a west coast commerce startup in the mid-1990s. Early on she was involved with US Web. She was director of strategy for Visionary Systems. Early on, she was a vice president and co-founder of WorthKnowing.com, which was sold to CompuCredit and TransUnion. Afterwards, she spent seven years in corporate development with CompuCredit, As a corporate development executive with CompuCredit Corporation (now Atlanticus), she was in charge of directing efforts regarding "entering new markets" and developing products.

She was the vice president of strategy for Revolution Money in St. Petersburg, Florida.

=== Kabbage ===
In 2008, she co-founded Kabbage with Marc Gorlin and Rob Frohwein. The business began in May 2011. In 2015, the Kabbage platform was extended to large banks including Santander. She is Kabbage's head of operations and has been its chief operating officer.

== Personal life ==
She and her husband have two children and live in Atlanta.
