= Virginia Uldrick =

Teacher of music, speech, and drama

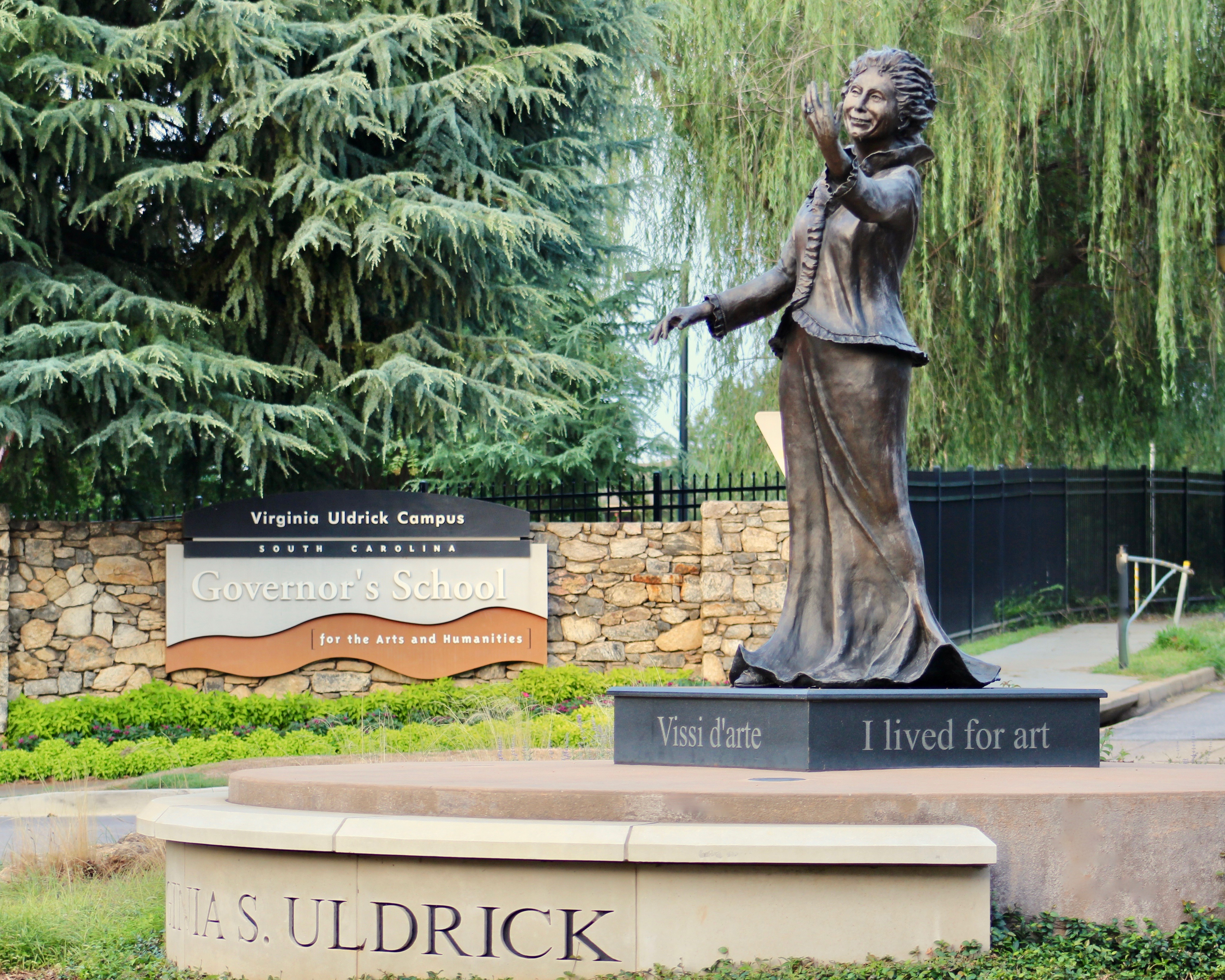
Statue of Virginia S. Uldrick outside the entrance to the Governor's School.

Virginia Short Uldrick (January 7, 1929 – November 15, 2017) was a teacher of music, speech, and drama and the founder and first president of the South Carolina Governor's School for the Arts & Humanities, a public residential high school in Greenville, South Carolina.

Virginia Short was born in 1929, a few blocks from the current location of the Governor's School. Intending to become an opera singer, Short majored in voice at the Greenville Woman's College of Furman University and later earned a master's degree in music education at the University of South Carolina. She completed additional graduate work at Columbia University and Peabody Conservatory. In 1988, Uldrick was awarded honorary doctorates by Furman University and Columbia College.

Following her marriage to construction executive Marion Uldrick, she taught in public schools and, despite sometimes debilitating illness, she became a vigorous advocate of arts education in Upstate South Carolina. In the 1960s, Uldrick founded the "Singing Christmas Tree," which for more than 20 years annually featured high school students singing in a towering Christmas-tree-like structure. In 1974, she founded the Fine Arts Center of the School District of Greenville County, and in 1981, she first supervised a six-week summer Governor's School. In 1999, when she was 70, she assumed leadership of the new nine-month residential school, the creation of which she had urged on state political leaders for more than twenty years. Uldrick retired in 2003.

In 1981 Uldrick was awarded the Elizabeth O’Neill Verner Award of the South Carolina Arts Commission, and in 1985, Governor Richard Riley presented Uldrick with the Order of the Palmetto. In 2014, a statue of Uldrick—the first statue of a woman erected in Greenville—was placed near the entrance of the Governor's School. Sculpted by South Carolina artist Zan Wells, the statue included on its base the first words of Uldrick's favorite aria, "Vissi d’Arte” (“I lived for art.”) from Puccini’s opera Tosca. Following her death, Uldrick's pastor called her a "classic Type-A personality who pressed for not just the good but the best."
