= Druanne White =

American lawyer

South Carolina 10th Circuit Solicitor
- In office 2000–2004

Personal details
- Education: Furman University; University of South Carolina School of Law (JD)

Military service
- Allegiance: United States
- Branch/service: United States Marine Corps
- Rank: Captain

Druanne Dykes White (born c. 1960) is an American trial lawyer based in South Carolina. She was a prosecutor for the state for more than 11 years, and was then elected to a four-year term as solicitor for the Tenth Judicial Circuit, serving from 2000 to 2004. She has since returned to private practice.

== Early life and education ==
White earned her undergraduate degree at Furman University, and her J.D. degree at the University of South Carolina School of Law.

== Career ==
After law school, White served in the United States Marines Corps as a Judge Advocate General's Corps officer for a few years. She was hired as a state prosecutor, serving in this position for more than 11 years. In 1999, she was elected as solicitor (the equivalent of a district attorney) for the Tenth Judicial Circuit, where she served a four-year term (2000–2004).

During her time as prosecutor, White became one of the foremost experts on capital murder cases in the United States. She was invited to testify as an expert witness to the U.S. Senate Judiciary committee on June 10, 2002. She testified in the matter of “Reducing the Risk of Executing the Innocent: The Report of the Illinois Governor's Commission on Capital Punishment”, along with other experts in the field, including author Scott Turow, Donald Hubert, and Professor Larry Marshall (Northwestern University School of Law).

White taught the Career Prosecutors Course at the College of the National District Attorneys Association in Alexandria, Virginia, which is attended by prosecutors from around the country.

=== Stephanie Carter ===
Among White's notable trials as prosecutor was that known for its victim, Stephanie Carter, a four-year-old girl who died at the hands of her father and stepmother after suffering physical abuse for a year. After Carter's father pleaded guilty, White prosecuted her stepmother and won a conviction.

White subsequently co-authored a state bill entitled Stephanie's Law, to make it easier for law enforcement to protect children in South Carolina from abuse. Among other provisions, it requires classification of suspected child abuse cases immediately as "unfounded" or "indicated", and allows reopening of cases upon the receipt of additional information.

== Defense Attorney ==
After losing a bid for re-election as Tenth Circuit Solicitor to challenger Chrissy Adams, White opened her own law practice. As a defense attorney, White has helped to gain acquittal in two cases of women accused of murder, arguing successfully that they had been acting in self-defense.

=== April McCullough ===
McCullough was charged with shooting and killing her 32-year-old boyfriend, Scotty Fowler, in February 2005. She claimed that he had had a history of committing domestic violence against her. The jury acquitted McCullough, convinced by White's argument that Fowler had abused her client and McCullough killed him in self-defense.

=== Cynthia Marchbanks ===
On September 8, 2006, 23-year-old Cynthia Marchbanks and 22-year-old Amber Robey, who were childhood friends, argued. Marchbanks fled to her home, and Robey charged in. Afraid, Marchbanks fired her .45 caliber pistol at Robey, killing her with a shot to the chin. Robey was 6 months pregnant and her baby was delivered early by emergency Caesarean section in an attempt to save it. The baby died 40 days later.

White defended Marchbanks and won her acquittal of murder in a jury trial. She was believed to have killed her pregnant neighbor in self-defense, after an argument escalated.

== Honors ==
- 2000 - elected Prosecutor of the Year by the South Carolina Solicitor's Association.
- 2003 - Governor Mark Sanford appointed White to a 4-year term on the South Carolina Prosecution Commission, which coordinates the state's prosecution of capital cases.
- 2006 - Sanford awarded White the Order of the Palmetto, South Carolina's highest civilian honor.
