= Kabbage =

Online financial technology company

Kabbage Inc.
- Website type: Financial services
- Dissolved: 2020
- Successor: American Express Business Blueprint
- Owner: American Express
- Creators: Rob Frohwein; Kathryn Petralia; Marc Gorlin
- Revenue: ▲$200 million(2017)
- Website: kabbage.com
- Launched: February 12, 2009; 17 years ago
- Current status: Redirected

Kabbage was an online financial technology company based in Atlanta.

The company provided unsecured loans and funding directly to small businesses and consumers through an automated lending platform. In 2020, the company was acquired by American Express and its mobile app was rebranded as American Express Business Blueprint.

== History ==
Kabbage launched and began providing loans in May 2011. In 2012, it opened its San Francisco office and subsequently raised $30 million in Series C financing. Beginning in February 2013, the company expanded internationally, entering the United Kingdom and raising further debt financing. Between 2014 and 2017, the company raised a further $435M in equity funding, and $970M in debt financing.

At its peak, Kabbage lent over $1B each year to small businesses. On October 16, 2020, Kabbage was acquired by American Express and was subsequently rebranded as American Express Business Blueprint.

In October 2022, Kabbage d/b/a K Servicing (an entity which was not acquired by American Express) filed for Chapter 11 bankruptcy following a report by the United States Congress which suggested it might have facilitated fraudulent Paycheck Protection Program payouts during the COVID-19 pandemic but the allegations are, as of yet, unsubstantiated.

== Purpose ==
Kabbage provided small businesses with debt facilities. In March 2020, Kabbage suspended lending services for active and new customers in favor of offering loans to U.S. businesses through the PPP (Paycheck Protection Program) introduced as part of the Trump administration's COVID-19 economic stimulus package.
