= South Carolina Governor's School for the Arts & Humanities =

South Carolina Governor's School for the Arts and Humanities

Location
- 15 University Street; Greenville, South Carolina 29601; United States; 34.843159°N 82.401562°W

Information
- Type: Public boarding school
- Established: 1999 (27 years ago)
- Founder: Virginia Uldrick
- School district: Governor's School for the Arts and Humanities
- CEEB code: 410914
- NCES School ID: 450390401580
- President: Cedric Adderley
- Dean: Jennifer Thomas
- Grades: 10–12
- Enrollment: 242 (max. capacity)
- Campus size: 8.5 acres (34,000 m^{2})
- Campus type: Urban
- Colors: Black, dark blue, teal, and yellow
- Accreditation: ACCPAS; Accredited 2004; Renewed 2013
- School fees: As of 2019–2020: $3,450 (food services) $150 (enrollment)
- Tuition: Free
- Website: www.scgsah.org

The South Carolina Governor's School for the Arts & Humanities (SCGSAH) is a boarding school for the arts located in Greenville, South Carolina, United States. Founded in 1999 by Virginia Uldrick, the high school program provides pre-professional training in creative writing, dance, drama, film, music and visual arts to sophomores, juniors and seniors, in a master-apprentice, arts-centered community. The Governor's School also offers arts-intensive summer programs for 7th-through-11th-grade students.

As one of the state's three Governor's Schools, enrollment is eligible to any South Carolina student with selection based on application to individual arts areas and auditions for most programs. High school study consists of academic coursework that meets the requirements of the South Carolina high school diploma, studio practice with professional artist-faculty members, and a humanities-focused component integrated throughout the academic year. Tuition for the nine-month high school is free; financial assistance is available to offset the required purchase of a high school meal plan and a residence hall fee.

As a part of its mission, the Governor's School serves as an arts resources to all teachers and students in South Carolina, offering comprehensive outreach programs designed to bring together artists, educators, community organizations and schools.

== History ==
The South Carolina Governor's School for the Arts began as a state-supported five-week program hosted by Furman University in Greenville, South Carolina. Its creation was driven by Virginia Uldrick, a music educator and district official who had served as the first director of Greenville's Fine Arts Center arts magnet school begun by Greenville District Superintendent J. Floyd Hall in the 1970s. Uldrick, along with businessman Arthur Magill, first proposed the idea of a statewide summer arts program to Governor James Edwards in 1979; the request was denied based on a Governor's School summer program already in place at the College of Charleston. A second proposal with the support of Uldrick, Magill, and Hall was submitted in 1980 with Governor Richard Riley issuing an executive order creating the program in October of that year.

The inaugural session on 1 July 1981 accommodated students in drama, visual arts, and creative writing. Studies in music and dance would be added later on in the second and fourth summers. Enrollment was limited to 260 students; an Outreach Program located in Orangeburg County and offshoot Academy and Dance programs expanded offerings around the state in the late 1980s.

By 1990, two feasibility studies had been conducted on the concept of adding a year-round residential program. Bill 4036 sponsored by David Wilkins in support of such a program was presented to the South Carolina House of Representatives in 1993, but it was not passed until 15 June 1994. After taking effect in 1995, a legislative study committee formed by Governor Carroll Campbell carried out the bill's action of determining "the desirability and feasibility of providing funding, location, and access for a year-round governor's school for the arts and humanities." Uldrick and her staff formulated the school's accessibility plan for students of South Carolina while committee leader Senator J. Verne Smith investigated proposals to host the school. Out of the five entities expressing interest—Aiken, the Unified Alliance for the Governor's School of Greenville, Newberry, Union, and USC-Spartanburg—Greenville was the unanimous committee vote to be the location for the new school.

The Greenville campus broke ground on 11 May 1998 after land, money, and a design for the campus had been secured. The school's 8.5 acres overlooking the Reedy River in Greenville's West End were donated in a joint arrangement with both the City of Greenville and Greenville County as negotiated by Greenville developer Bob Hughes and attorney C. Thomas Wyche. Meanwhile, in the two years leading up to construction, a capital campaign co-chaired by Governor's School for the Arts Foundation board members Minor Mickel Shaw and Mary Rainey Belser raised a total of $14.5 million in private sector donations to secure the state's agreement of $12 million in funding. The final necessary component—the school's design—was settled through an architectural competition coordinated by Hughes and state entities, with Greenville-based firm Freeman & Major Architects being awarded the contract for their concept of a Tuscan village.

The school opened on 5 September 1999 with a class of 125 students housed in its dormitory on campus. The arts-academic complex planned for the rest of the campus remained in progress after the school's opening and was not finished until January of the following year. A second phase of construction completed the original campus setting with the addition of a gymnasium, science wing, additional classrooms, and faculty offices.

== Campus ==
The campus, named in Uldrick's honor, is situated on an east-west bluff immediately south of Falls Park on the Reedy in downtown Greenville. Its land, along with the Greenville County Square complex to its south, once comprised the men's campus of Furman University before being razed for redevelopment in 1958. In the context of the city, construction of the school in 1998 fulfilled a long-standing objective of Greenville's downtown revitalization as the desire for a Governor's School for the Arts had been enumerated in strategic planning led by former mayor Max Heller from as early as 1987. Placement of the school in the West End in proximity to venues like the Peace Center for the Performing Arts was also noted in reinforcing the area's arts and entertainment identity.

Original campus
Initial plans by Freeman|Major Architects drew inspiration from Italian architecture and built around the idea of a European artist village. The main complex, oriented around a communal courtyard and amphitheater facing north, contains a variety of arts studios, administrative offices, and academic classrooms generally organized into departmental centers (e.g., the Hartness Guinn Center for Music, the John and Genevieve Sakas Center for Drama, the Dorothy Peace Ramsaur Center for Academics, etc.). Performance spaces such as the Margaret Reynolds Smith Recital Hall and the Sakas Theatre are integrated into the building and provide for on-campus events; visual arts exhibitions are also available through the Lipscomb Family Foundation Gallery located within the campus as well. The campus is also served by the John I. Smith Charities Library which holds a collection of over 20,000 items, a computer lab, and a production room. The dormitory, named in honor of J. Verne Smith, exists as a separate structure at the east end of the campus with housing for a maximum of 242 students.

Renovations and additions
After its initial phases of construction in 1998, the physical campus remained relatively unchanged. Dormitory renovations updating student lounges and residential staff facilities took place in 2008, but new structural expansion of the main complex would not take place until 2013 upon construction of a new administrative wing at the front of the campus. In May 2018, the school broke ground on the last remaining land available for expansion to accommodate a two-story, 10,000 square foot building for the music department to house studios, practice rooms, large ensemble spaces and humidity-controlled instrument storage space.

== Admissions and curriculum ==
Admission to the high school program is based on a combined application and audition process per artistic discipline of interest in the academic year preceding entry. Specific audition requirements vary by arts area but collectively engage components such as portfolio review, workshop or performance settings, and interviews to evaluate artistic ability and potential. South Carolina students are generally eligible to apply in their tenth-grade year, though with some exceptions: Consideration for sophomore entry is allowed in the areas of dance and music, and music students may apply for senior entry through application during the junior year.

Students attending SCGSAH continue completing the educational requirements towards a South Carolina high school diploma. The school offers core subject areas—English, mathematics, sciences, social studies, and foreign languages—at College Preparatory (CP), Honors, and Advanced Placement (AP) levels. Academic periods are scheduled in the morning with afternoon class hours dedicated to arts instruction within the discipline of enrollment. Upon graduation, students who have completed all academic, arts, and humanities requirements graduate with a South Carolina high school diploma as well as a South Carolina Governor's School for the Arts and Humanities Scholars Diploma in their arts discipline.

=== Creative writing ===
Courses in creative writing are led by professional writers in practicing literary forms and genres such as creative nonfiction, fiction, poetry, and screenwriting. Subsequent classes in each focus area continue individual critiques, work development, and exposure to established writers while approaching new structures and elements.

=== Dance ===
Study in dance involves multi-year development of ballet technique based on a variety of classical ballet training systems such as Vaganova method, Cecchetti method, and that of the Royal Academy of Dance. Training in pointe or men's technique and Variation is also undertaken, progressing to choreography and styles taught in Ballet Repertoire courses; pas de deux classes are added selectively at the culmination of training. In the same span, student dancers also gain experience with modern and contemporary dance repertoire with additional courses in pilates, improvisation, and specific dance-relevant seminars—historical dance, nutrition, dance-related careers, etc.—included within the curriculum.

=== Drama ===
Dramatic training at the school is organized through continuous coursework in acting, voice and speech development, and auxiliary topics such as movement studies, theatre history, and professional preparation. Acting class integrates the Michael Chekhov technique and perspectives from and components of the work of Viola Spolin, Uta Hagen,Tawnya Pettiford-Wates, Augusto Boal, and other practitioners. The semester culminates in the rehearsal and performance of selected scenes. Previous presentations have included works such as "Master Harold"...and the Boys by Athol Fugard, John Patrick Shanley's Doubt, and Shakespeare's The Tempest with the department also collaborating with the school's Outreach program to provide these performances to local schools visiting the campus.

=== Music ===
The music curriculum consists of several courses—year-long units of theory and music history, and possible study of twentieth-century music and/or music technology—complementing programs of individual and ensemble applied music. Instrumental and vocal students within the department take weekly, hour-long individual lessons along with master classes and group seminars while also participating in the school's larger string, wind, and/or sinfonia orchestral performance ensembles as appropriate. All music students are enrolled in the school's choir as part of the ensemble component; vocalists additionally participate in chamber choir and opera/musical theater workshop courses offered by the department. Classes in conducting, jazz ensemble, introductory piano, contemporary music, and music technology are also available in the junior and senior years.

=== Visual arts ===
Studio practices in the school's visual arts program are coordinated through four semesters of study in art principles, visual elements, and their applications in a variety of media. The junior foundation year begins with two-dimensional and three-dimensional design courses with instruction also in graphic and motion design. Additional material introductions take place in the second semester as classes include painting, sculpture, a continuation of motion design, and nine-week units in ceramics, metals, photography, and printmaking. More advanced studies—animation, etching and relief techniques, wheel-throwing, bronze casting, architecture and environmental design, etc.—proceed in the senior year elective options, culminating in a fourth-semester thesis and area of concentration. Drawing is prominent as a continuous component throughout the program, with practice in both observational drawing and figure-based work integrated into the curriculum. Similar to the other arts areas, relevant coursework such as AP or Honors art history, career and portfolio preparation, and a class emphasizing the usage of visual language is also required of students in addition to studio instruction.

=== Film ===
The newest program, Film, is split into the junior and senior years. The juniors focus on gaining a basic understanding in many aspects of film: screenwriting, editing, cinematography, directing, and sound. The seniors, along with more advanced classes, spend part of the year developing 4 short films, acting as the creative heads of the project.

=== Humanities ===
The school includes an integrated humanities curriculum alongside the arts and academic studies with specific inquiry to the interactions between and among the arts, artists, and society in connection to eras of Western culture. The component is carried out through readings, written responses, group discussion, and special projects including a PechaKucha presentation developed during the senior spring semester.

== Additional programs ==
The residential high school program of the South Carolina Governor's School for the Arts and Humanities exists as part of a schedule of year-round arts education offered by the school.

=== Outreach ===
Supported by the same funds that established the 1981 Summer Honors Program, the Outreach Program was "created to ensure fair and equal access to all Governor's School programs" and began in 1988 as a series of weekend workshops supporting students in small school districts and rural areas underserved in the arts. These Saturday workshops and masterclasses originally included dance and arts opportunities that would eventually give rise to the Preparatory Dance and Academy programs. As the scope and schedule of Governor's School programs developed through the high school's early years, so did the role and priorities of Outreach as its functions ran parallel to the continued recruitment, admission, and development of students with artistic potential across the state. As of 2019, the Outreach Department based on the Greenville campus continues to offer workshops, guest artist experiences, professional learning opportunities for teachers, and other outreach opportunities around South Carolina. During 2019, over 19,500 individuals from 29 counties in SC participated in 158 outreach experiences.

=== Summer Academy Program ===
The Academy Program began in 1990 as part of the Governor's School's recurring weekend programming before expanding into a two-week residential experience in 1992. Originally focused on serving as a Summer Honors preparatory program for rising tenth-grade students from outreach locations, enrollment was limited to select areas from South Carolina (i.e., excluding Aiken, Greenville, Lexington, Richland, and Spartanburg counties) through the late 1990s. Plans for expanded access existed as early as 1998, but implementation of the Academy's current availability to students from all counties was not recorded until 2002. Converse College in Spartanburg, South Carolina served as the host campus for at least thirteen years before the program and its studies in creative writing, drama, music, and visual arts were housed in Greenville.

=== Summer Dance Program ===
With instruction in dance incorporated into Summer Honors in the mid-1980s, a three-week Dance Preparatory Program for middle school students (completing grade six, seven, or eight) was already in place by the first official school record in 1997. Expansion of training to five weeks in ballet and modern dance occurred in the following year, and the program became available to rising tenth-grade students by 2003. The current Summer Dance program is now available to rising seventh- to twelfth-grade dancers and offers five weeks of study in classical ballet based on Vaganova technique.

=== Summer Discovery Program ===
The two-week residential Discovery Program was established in 2005 as an introductory opportunity for intensive arts study in the school's non-dance arts disciplines. It is sequentially prior to Academy, as students are eligible to apply only during their eighth-grade year. With the addition of animation to the high school visual arts curriculum in 2014, the school also established a concurrent two-week Discovery Animation program in the summer of 2015.In an effort to serve more students, the Discovery Program was replaced with the Arts Odyssey program in 2019, a one-week program for rising 8th and 9th grade students.

=== Arts Odyssey Program ===
The summer Arts Odyssey program was established in 2019, replacing the Discovery Program, to serve more students in the state. Two one-week sessions provide an immersive arts experience for rising eight and ninth-grade students who choose to concentrate in creative writing, drama, music and visual arts. Students apply to this program, but are not required to audition.

=== Teacher Institutes ===
The Arts Teacher as Artist Institute (Teacher's Institute) is a week-long guided studio program held on campus for attending arts educators in the early summer. The Institute has been in place since 2004 with USC-Upstate acting as the sponsoring institution of record since 2010. A similar program, the Graduate Internship for Arts Educators (or the Graduate Studies/Intern Program), preceded the Institute through 2003 with coursework allowing graduate credit hours in gifted education and/or technology and curriculum development.

== Achievements and recognition ==
Since its establishment, SCGSAH has been repeatedly recognized for its educational programs. The school has been awarded twelve South Carolina Department of Education Palmetto Gold Awards since 2002, and is a three-time recipient of the state's Elizabeth O'Neill Verner Governor's Award for the Arts for its Summer Honors (1986–1987), Outreach (1992–1993), and high school programs (2001). It was named as one of sixteen US National Service-Learning Leader Schools by the Corporation for National and Community Service in 2002 and has ranked nationally—as high as 26th by The Daily Beast website and 59th in Newsweek magazine—in lists of best public high schools in the United States. The school has been accredited by the Accrediting Commission for Community and Precollegiate Arts Schools (ACCPAS), with initial accreditation in 2004 and successful renewal in 2013.

Additional SCGSAH honors in the arts include the Youth America Grand Prix (YAGP) Regional Award for Outstanding School in both 2002 and 2003 and the YAGP Outstanding School Award at the New York YAGP Finals in 2004. The school's ensembles have performed on programs such as NPR's classical showcase From the Top and in settings such as St. Peter's Basilica at the Vatican for the 500th anniversary of the Cappella Giulia in 2013. Student accomplishments during the school's history include selection for national ensembles or intensive-study programs including the National High School Honors Orchestra and the National Symphony Orchestra's Kennedy Center Summer Music Institute, juried exhibition selection at the National K-12 Ceramic Exhibition, publication in The Kenyon Review, and awards such as the Helsinki International Ballet Competition Young Talent Prize and the YAGP Senior Division Grand Prix and Outstanding Artistry awards. Governor's School students have been recognized in other national competitions such as those held by the Music Teachers National Association (MTNA), the National Association of Teachers of Singing (NATS), the National YoungArts Foundation, and the Alliance for Young Artists & Writers. Past achievements include the Senior Brass National Winner, the NATS Mid-Atlantic Top Prize, twelve student/alumni award-winners in the 2015 YoungArts competition, and regional and national success in the annual Scholastic Awards with distinctions including multiple Portfolio Gold Medal winners in creative writing and American Visions Medals in the visual arts.

SCGSAH students have been named Presidential Scholars in the Arts (Note: Including, based on Annual Reports, 1 in 2008, 2 in 2010, 2 in 2011, 2 in 2012, and 1 in 2013) and have received selective designations including Scholastic National Student Poet and Davidson Institute Fellow based on the merits of their artistic work. The school's first graduating class accumulated over $5.6 million in scholarship offers in 2001; by 2018, the year's graduating class had received over $32 million and reached a cumulative school total of over $337 million in scholarship offers since the school's founding. Governor's School graduates have continued on to a variety of post-secondary programs with institutions including schools such as Rhode Island School of Design, The Juilliard School, the University of Minnesota Actor Training Program in conjunction with the Guthrie Theater, Eastman School of Music, and the Peabody Conservatory.

== Notable figures ==
Residential high school alumni, listed by discipline of enrollment and final year of study or graduation:

- Michelle Beck (Drama, 2001) – actress and singer
- Nicole Beharie (Drama, 2003) – Emmy Award-nominated actress; 42, Sleepy Hollow
- Danielle Brooks (Drama, 2007) – Academy Award, Emmy Award, Tony Award-nominated, Grammy Award winning actress - Orange is the New Black, The Color Purple
- Susan Heyward (Drama, 2001) – actress; Vinyl, The Purple Lights of Joppa Illinois
- Whitney Huell (Dance, 2004) – company dancer, Kansas City Ballet
- Patina Miller (Drama, 2002) – Tony Award-winning actress and singer; Sister Act, Pippin, The Hunger Games: Mockingjay – Part 1 and Part 2
- Teyonah Parris (Drama, 2005) – actress; Mad Men
- Joseph Phillips (Dance, 2001) – 2002 USA International Ballet Competition Junior Gold Medalist; former corps de ballet, ABT; principal dancer, State Primorsky Opera and Ballet Theater
- Jacolby Satterwhite (Visual Arts, 2004) – multimedia artist featured in the 2014 Whitney Biennial
- Wrenn Schmidt (Drama, 2001) – actress; Boardwalk Empire
- Seph Stanek (Music, Voice, 2004) – American singer, actor, and television producer; principle company member of the New York Gilbert and Sullivan Players (NYGASP); appeared on Broadway in My Love Letter to Broadway; served as a duet partner in concert for Kristin Chenoweth; produced televised specials for ABC (I'm Coming Home, executive produced by Whoopi Goldberg) and PBS (Angels Among Us: Christmas with the Tabernacle Choir); featured in multiple Off-Broadway musical productions; and performed in 25+ benefit concerts for Broadway Cares/Equity Fights AIDS, including Broadway Backwards, Gypsy of the Year, and The Easter Bonnet Competition.
- Travis Lamont Ballenger (Drama, 2004) - Tony Award-winning producer, Almost Famous, MJ The Musical Founder, The Leadership Project

Founding alumni (Summer Honors Programs attendees between 1981 and 2000)

- Phillip Boykin – actor; Tony Award nominee for Porgy and Bess
- Todd Haberkorn – voice actor
- Joseph Young – Assistant Conductor of the Atlanta Symphony Orchestra; Music Director of the Atlanta Symphony Youth Orchestra

Presidents

- 1999–2003: Virginia S. Uldrick
- 2003–2007: Donald W. Beckie
- 2007–2015: Bruce R. Halverson
- 2015–current: Cedric Adderley

== See also ==
- South Carolina Governor's School for Science and Mathematics
