= Barbara Ann Teer =

American actress (1937–2008)

- Born: June 18, 1937; East St. Louis, Illinois, U.S.
- Died: July 21, 2008 (aged 71); Harlem, U.S.
- Education: University of Illinois, Urbana-Champaign
- Occupations: Writer, producer, teacher, actress
- Known for: Founder of the National Black Theatre

Barbara Ann Teer (June 18, 1937 – July 21, 2008) was an American writer, producer, teacher, actress and social visionary. In 1968, she founded Harlem's National Black Theatre, the first revenue-generating black theater arts complex in the U.S.

== Early life ==
Teer was born in East St. Louis, Illinois, to Fred L. and Lila B. Teer, well known as dedicated educators and community leaders. Early in her life, Barbara demonstrated extraordinary gifts and talents. At 15, she graduated from Lincoln High School in East St. Louis. At 19, she graduated magna cum laude with a bachelor's degree in dance education from the University of Illinois, Urbana-Champaign, and immediately travelled to study dance with Antoine Decroaux in Paris, France, and with Mary Wigman in Berlin, Germany. Her sister, Frederika Teer, was a Congress of Racial Equality (CORE) Field Secretary (organizer) in the north and mid-South from 1960. She and Genevieve Hughes were the first women to hold the title.

== Career in the theatre ==
Following her international travels, Teer came to New York City, where she pursued a career as a professional dancer. She studied with Alwin Nikolais at the Henry Street Playhouse and Syvilla Fort (Katherine Dunham Technique). She toured with the Alvin Ailey Dance Company, Louis Johnson Dance Company and the Pearl Bailey Las Vegas Revue. In 1961, Teer made her Broadway debut as dance captain in the Tony Award-winning musical Kwamina, which was choreographed by Agnes de Mille. Teer performed in the film version of Ossie Davis's stage play Purlie Victorious.

After a knee injury in 1962, Teer switched her primary artistic focus from dance to theatre. She studied with notable actors including Sanford Meisner, Paul Mann, Lloyd Richards, and Phillip Burton. Teer crafted a lucrative and successful acting career, receiving numerous accolades, including a Drama Desk Award and several Obie Awards. Between 1961 and 1966, she continued to perform on and off-Broadway, as well as in television and film.

Teer grew disillusioned with the negative stereotypes she came across in her quest for responsible acting roles, making an exception to appear in the 1969 motion picture Slaves. In 1963, she co-founded The Group Theatre Workshop with Robert Hooks, which later became the Negro Ensemble Company. Arguing for independence from the white-dominated mainstream, she wrote in a 1968 article in The New York Times:

We must begin building cultural centers where we can enjoy being free, open and black, where we can find out how talented we really are, where we can be what we were born to be and not what we were brainwashed to be, where we can literally 'blow our minds' with blackness.

== National Black Theatre ==
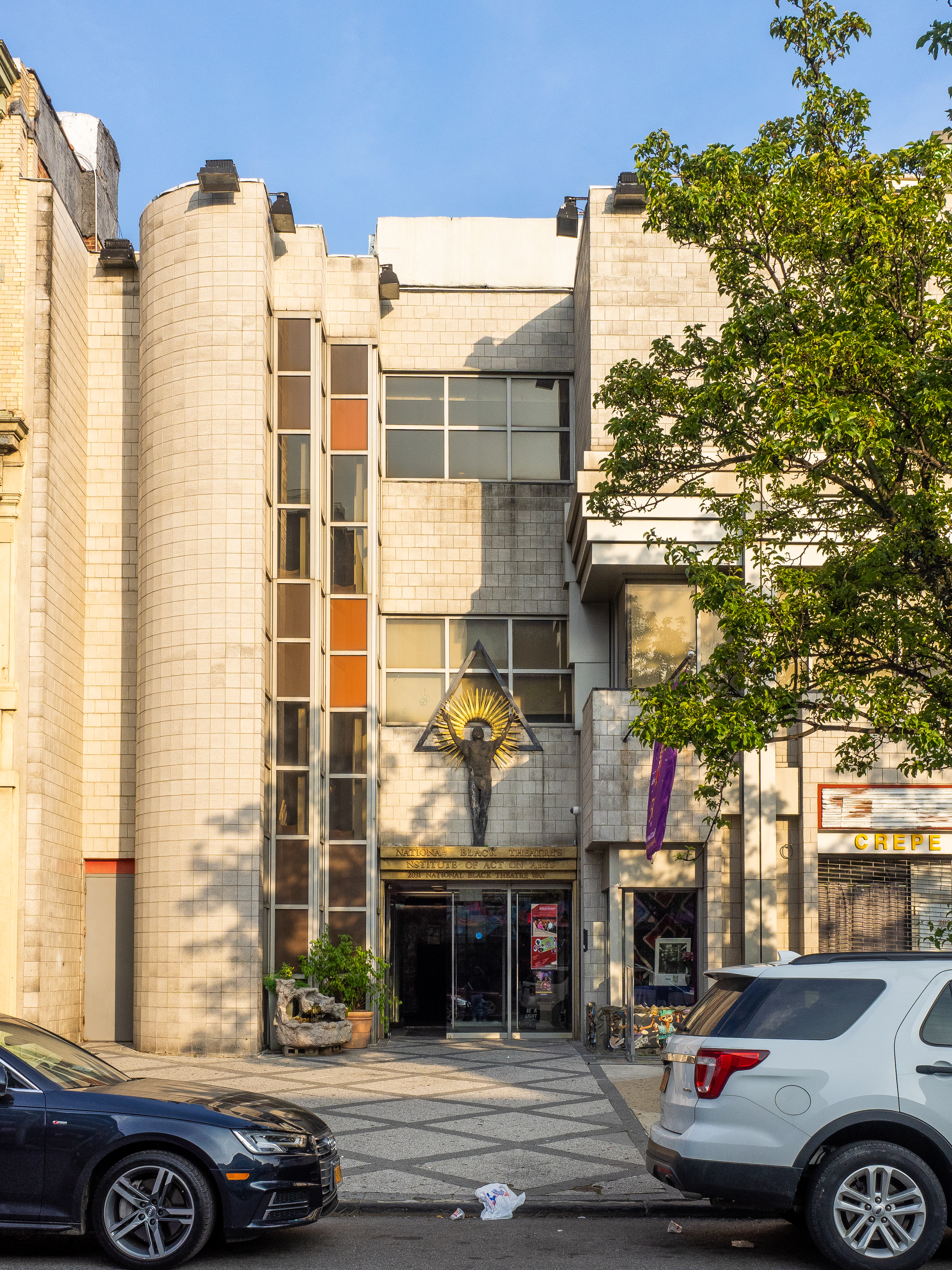
Front entrance of the original National Black Theater, founded by Teer.

In 1968, with the emerging cultural consciousness of the African experience, Teer decided to found a new theatrical institution committed to cultural transformation, social change, and historical innovation within African-American communities. Leaving a career, and following in the activist footsteps of her older sister Fredrica (who had been an organizer with Eldridge Cleaver and Stokley Carmichael), Teer founded the National Black Theatre (NBT).

=== Methodology ===
In addition to her role as a pioneer of Black theatre that reached beyond America, she developed a methodology taught exclusively at the National Black Theatre called "TEER: The Technology of Soul."

=== Schools and cadre trainings ===
In 1974, Teer founded the Children's School for the Development of Intuitive and God-Conscious Art (CSDIG).

Teer wrote, directed and produced ritualistic revivals (plays) and interactive artistic reviews.

=== Real estate ===
She purchased a city block of property in Central Harlem on a major business corridor at 125th Street and Fifth Avenue. The National Black Theatre was the sponsoring developer for a 64,000 square feet (5,900 m^{2}) real estate project that became the first revenue-generating Black Theatre Arts Complex in the country.

== Personal life ==
Teer had an early marriage to actor Godfrey Cambridge (1962–65). After that union ended, she had two children with Michael Adeyemi Lythcott: Michael F. "Omi" Lythcott and Barbara A. "Sade" Lythcott, CEO of the National Black Theatre.

Teer died in Harlem of natural causes on July 21, 2008, aged 71.

== See also ==
- Black Drama
