= National Black Theatre =

Community-based organisation in Harlem, New York

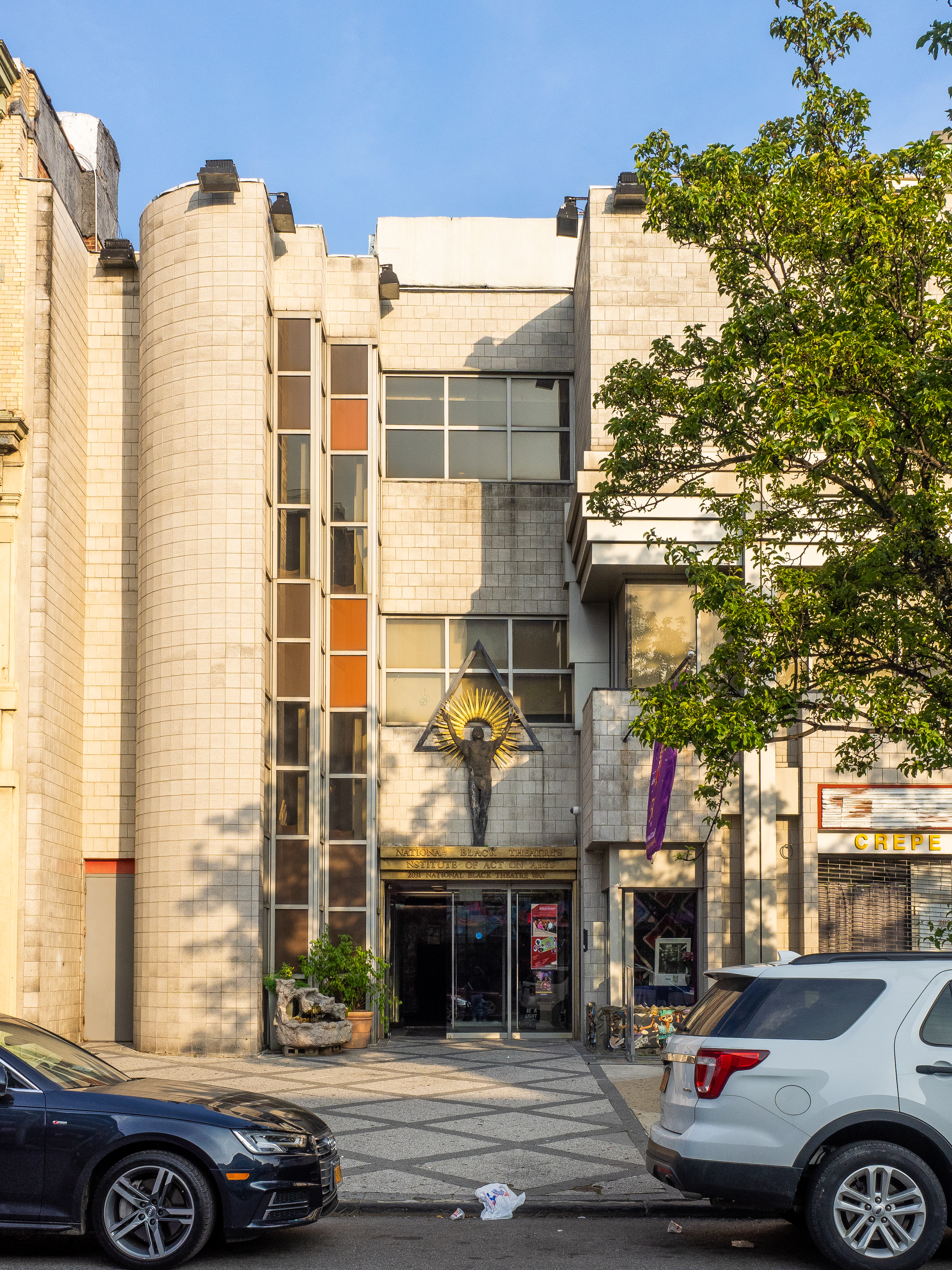
- Entrance (2019)
- Formation: 1968
- Founder: Barbara Ann Teer
- Type: Theatre group
- Location: Harlem, New York
- Artistic director: Jonathan McCrory
- Website: nationalblacktheatre.org

The National Black Theatre (NBT) is a non-profit cultural and educational corporation, and community-based theatre company located on 5th Avenue in Harlem, New York.

== History ==
The National Black Theatre (NBT) is a non-profit cultural and educational corporation, and community-based theatre company born out of the civil rights movement to tell the stories of black theatre that did not often have a home in mainstream theatre. Based in the Harlem neighborhood of the New York City borough of Manhattan, NBT was founded in 1968 by actress, director, producer, Dr. Barbara Ann Teer.

Teer founded the NBT with a goal of creating a "massive cultural and artistic movement to create people culturally literate". She viewed the African-American community as one that was in desperate need of an African cultural education. The company committed itself to representing and establishing "a black theatrical standard -- a standard based on black lifestyle".

Teer turned the theatre into a cultural incubator that provided shows and workshops to help promote respect for the African ancestry and for black self-expression. The NBT produced plays that were dedicated to raising the consciousness of the African-American community by crafting a distinct departure from White theatrical conventions. As Teer wrote in a critical essay, "You cannot have a theatre without ideology, without a base from which all of the forms must emanate and call it Black, for it will be the same as Western theatre, conventional theatre, safe theatre".

Notable productions performed at the NBT included Ritual, Change! Love Together! Organize! A Revival, Five on the Black Hand Side, The Believers, Softly Comes a Whirlwind, Whispering in Your Ear, and A Soul Journey into Truth. Distinguished artists that have performed at the NBT include Nina Simone, Maya Angelou and Nikki Giovanni.

After Teer died in 2008, her daughter Sade Lythcott took over as CEO and to this day continues her leadership over the theatre. It is one of the longest continually operating Black theatres in the United States.

Once Sade Lythcott took over the role as CEO, one of the first challenges that was faced was the threat of the foreclosure of the theatre. NBT was involved in various disagreements in regards with surrounding business including with the Applebee's franchise. These disputes had since been resolved. The disputes has resulted in an over $10 million debt including their previous debts but was relieved when Baltoro Capital Management took over in the spring of 2012. Since then, the management company has promised to keep the theatre rent-free even if the building was ever sold.

=== Buildings ===
While the theatre originally rented its space on 127th and East 125th Streets, Teer purchased the 8,000 square foot theatre in 1969 at 9 East 125th street. In 1982, the NBT expanded to a 64,000 square foot complex that housesd two theatres, classrooms, and an African and Nigerian art gallery.

In 2002, Barbara Ann Teer sold 49 percent of the property to Nubian Partners, which operated multiple retail outlets within the building. In April 2009, Nubian Partners signed a lease with Apple-Metro which is an Applebee's Franchisee. The franchise was planning to take on a lease in the building the National Black Theatre was located. Ms. Teer brought forth the case in early 2008, shortly before her death, arguing that Applebee's did not promote the cultural integrity mission that the theatre promoted. This was a condition she included when she signed the real estate partnership agreement with Nubian in 2002 when the theatre was threatened by foreclosure. Justice Walter B. Tolub, a judge for the New York County Supreme Court (Civil), ruled that leasing part of the building to Applebee's would be violating the contract between the two parties, National Black Theatre and Nubian Partners. On the afternoon of 15 July 2009, the State Supreme Court justice ruled that the Applebee's chain is not allowed to move into the building with the National Black Theatre.

In 2021, the theatre announced that it would replace its building with a twenty-one-story one that contained housing, retail and a new theatre space that will open in 2024.

== Awards and recognition ==
Over the course of more than 300 productions, the National Black Theater has earned more than 45 AUDELCO Black Theatre Excellence Awards, and continues to be an institution of African-American theater.

By 1986, the theatre was recognized as one of the most important arts institutions in America by President Ronald Reagan. Former New York State Governor Mario Cuomo acknowledged The National Black Theatre as "one of New York State’s greatest cultural treasures and resources and a cornerstone for the revitalization of 125th Street".

== See also ==
- The Ensemble Theatre
- Barbara Ann Teer
