= Lucasta =

Lucasta can refer to:

Surname

- Anna Lucasta (play)
- Anna Lucasta (1949 film)
- Anna Lucasta (1958 film)

Given name

- Lucasta Miller, English writer and literary journalist
- Lucasta, subject of the 1649 poem To Lucasta, Going to the Warres
- Lucasta, character in Tanner Hall (film)
