= Anna Lucasta =

Anna Lucasta may refer to:

- Anna Lucasta (play), a 1944 Broadway play by Philip Yordan
- Anna Lucasta (1949 film), an adaptation of the play directed by Irving Rapper, starring Paulette Goddard
- Anna Lucasta (1958 film), an adaptation of the play directed by Arnold Laven, starring Eartha Kitt and Sammy Davis Jr.
