= American Negro Theatre =

Community theater group in New York City

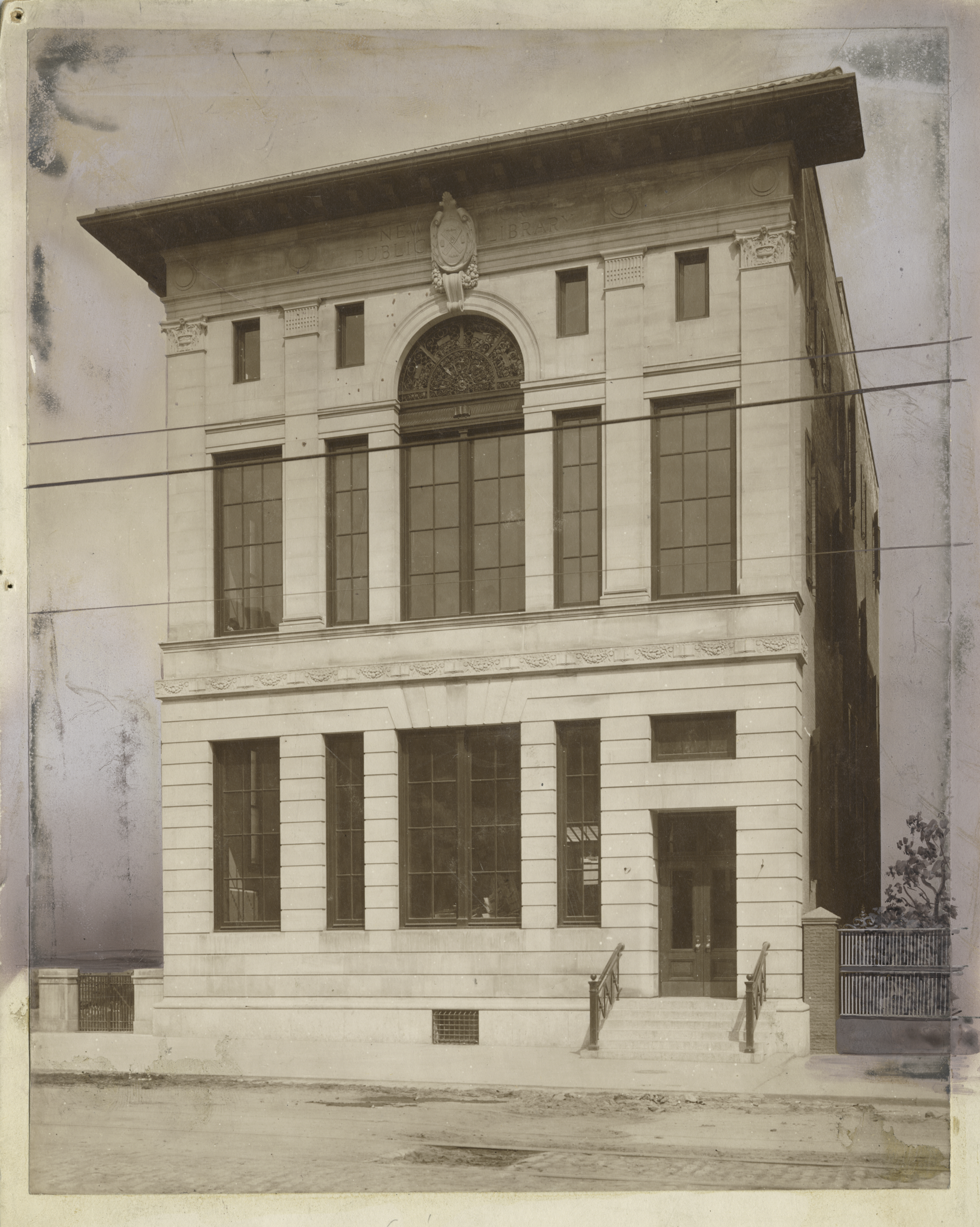
- Harlem's Little Library Theatre in the 135th Street branch of the New York Public Library hosted ANT's early performances.
- Formation: 1940
- Dissolved: 1951
- Type: Theatre group
- Purpose: A people's theatre for Black drama
- Location: New York City
- Members: Sidney Poitier, Harry Belafonte, Ruby Dee and Ossie Davis
- Artistic director(s): Abram Hill, Frederick O'Neal and John O’Shaughnessy

The American Negro Theatre (ANT) was co-founded on June 5, 1940, by playwright Abram Hill, actor Austin Briggs-Hall Sr., and actor Frederick O'Neal. Determined to build a "people's theatre", they were inspired by the Federal Theatre Project's Negro Unit in Harlem and by W. E. B. Du Bois' "four fundamental principles" of Black drama: that it should be by, about, for, and near African Americans.

The ANT produced 12 original Black plays and seven adaptations of non-Black work for tens of thousands of primarily Black audiences in its first nine years. The Black playwrights whose work the company produced included Countee Cullen (One Way To Heaven), Theodore Browne (Go Down Moses and Natural Man), Owen Dodson (Garden of Time), Alvin Hill (Walk Hard) and Curtis Cooksey (Starlight).

In addition to their theatre productions, the ANT also produced a weekly radio program in 1945, with a repertoire that spanned Shakespeare, Dickens and opera. It also ran the Studio Theatre school of drama under the leadership of Osceola Archer, one of the first Black actresses on Broadway. Many of her students later had careers in the performing arts, including television comediennes Helen Martin (Good Times and 227), Emmy-winning Isabel Sanford (All in the Family and The Jeffersons), and Clarice Taylor (Sanford and Son and The Cosby Show); stage and screen couple Ossie Davis and Ruby Dee, movie actor Sidney Poitier, and singer-actor Harry Belafonte. In a 1996 interview with Cornel West, Belafonte described how the American Negro Theatre opened his eyes to how "magical" theatre was. Belafonte said that he saw his first show in the ANT when he was given two tickets as a gratuity when working as a janitor's assistant for Clarice Taylor, who was in the play that night.

Aside from teaching, Archer also directed plays for the ANT, most notably a 1948 command performance for First Lady Eleanor Roosevelt of an integrated production of Katherine Garrison Chapin's play Sojourner Truth, featuring Belafonte and actress Jill Miller. Within the next few years, however, the ANT folded, a victim of repeated financial shortfalls and in-fighting over its mission in the wake of its Anna Lucasta success, for which its lead actress Alice Childress gained a Tony nomination for playing the title character.

Theatre arts scholar Jonathan Shandell counts ANT's expansion of the "repertoire to include canonical black playwrights, use of a predominantly black cast and crew in all productions, and ... community outreach efforts, such as the free Uptown Shakespeare performances at Marcus Garvey Park" among its most important legacies. The assessment of the curators of the Schomburg Center for Research in Black Culture at New York Public Library, which hosted ANT's 75th Anniversary in 2016 explained the ANT's importance by pointing out that ANT "sought to push the boundaries of black theatre ... experimenting with modernist theatrical tropes, and producing ambitious, original works by Black playwrights. Ultimately, the American Negro Theatre became one of the most influential black theater organizations of the 1940s," while also cultivating a generation of professional Black actors, directors and other artists in the performing arts who continue to influence the culture today.

== History ==
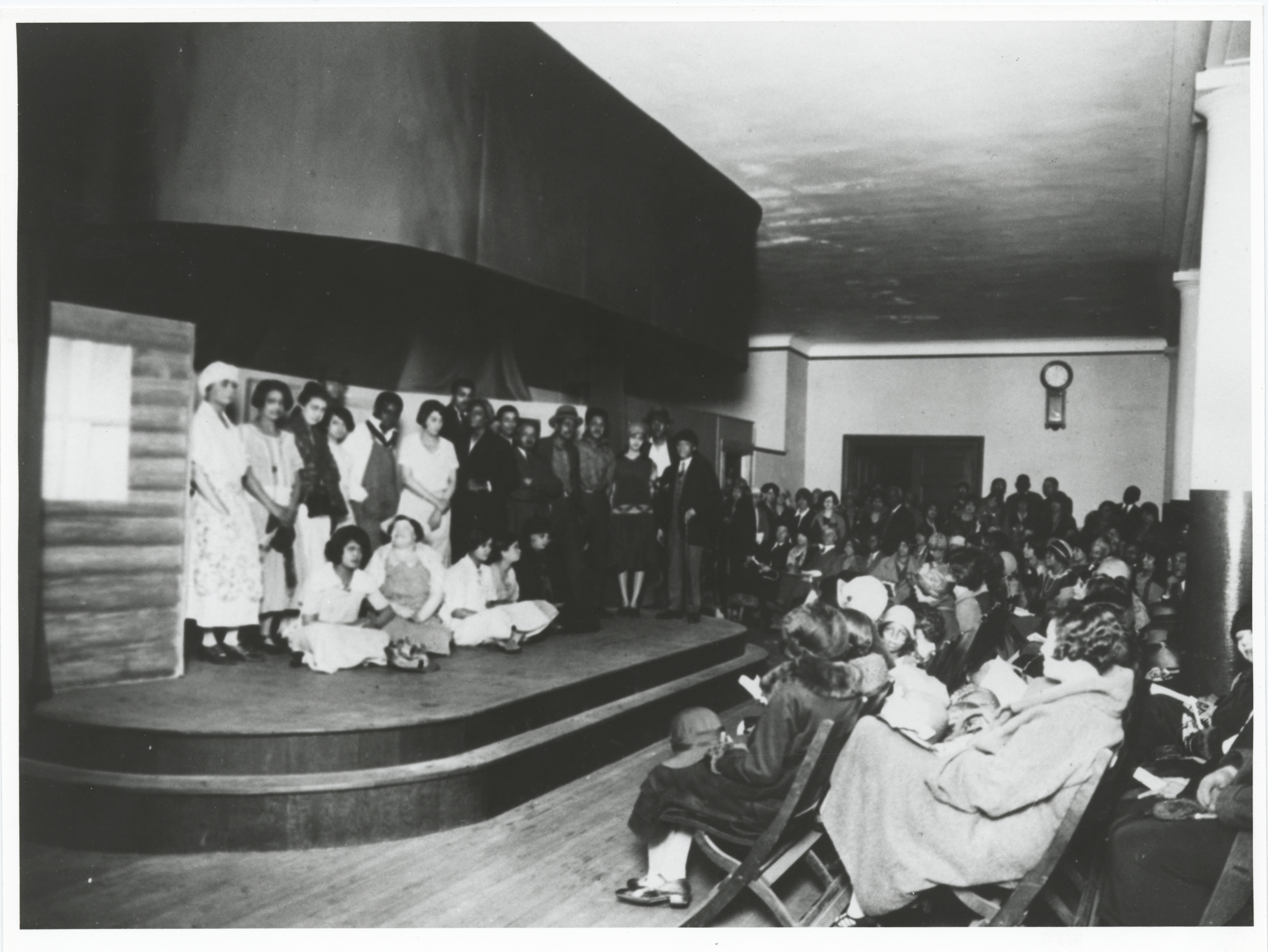
Photo of a 1926 performance of the Little Library Theatre at the 135th Street Branch of the New York Public Library.

Hill and O'Neal quickly garnered support for the American Negro Theatre, which they dubbed the ANT to reinforce the idea of a hard-working interdependent community, by assembling several of their theatre friends, including: Howard Augusta, James Jackson, Virgil Richardson, Claire Leyba, Jefferson D. Davis, Vivian Hall, Austin Briggs-Hall, Stanley Green, Fanny McConnell, and Kenneth Manigault. Together, they organized ANT "as a cooperative, and all members shared in the expenses and profits. The theatre's business model was parallel to its artistic policy of ensemble acting in lieu of individual leading roles."

Hill approached librarians at the public library on 135th Street in Harlem, the Harlem Branch of the New York Public Library, to start producing his plays. The librarians granted Hill and the ANT permission to use their 150-seat Little Library Theatre basement stage. The first show they produced Hits, Bits, and Skits opened on July 17, 1940.

The first major play that the ANT put into rehearsal was On Strivers' Row, which Hill put into rehearsal after it had done so well with the Rose McClendon Players, who also held performances in Harlem. On Strivers' Row ran for five months and, in March 1941, Hill moved it to the Apollo Theater, where it ran for a week, as a musical with the lyrics of Don Burley, the music of J. P. Johnson, and the choreography of Leonard Harper.

In 1944, the ANT submitted a proposal to the General Education Board of Rockefeller Center, explaining that their objectives were to develop (1) an Art, (2) a Vital Theatre and (3) Pride and Honor, and requesting funding for the salaries of the company's officers. The proposal resulted in a $22,000 grant-in-aid. These objectives were also printed on programs for ANT productions.

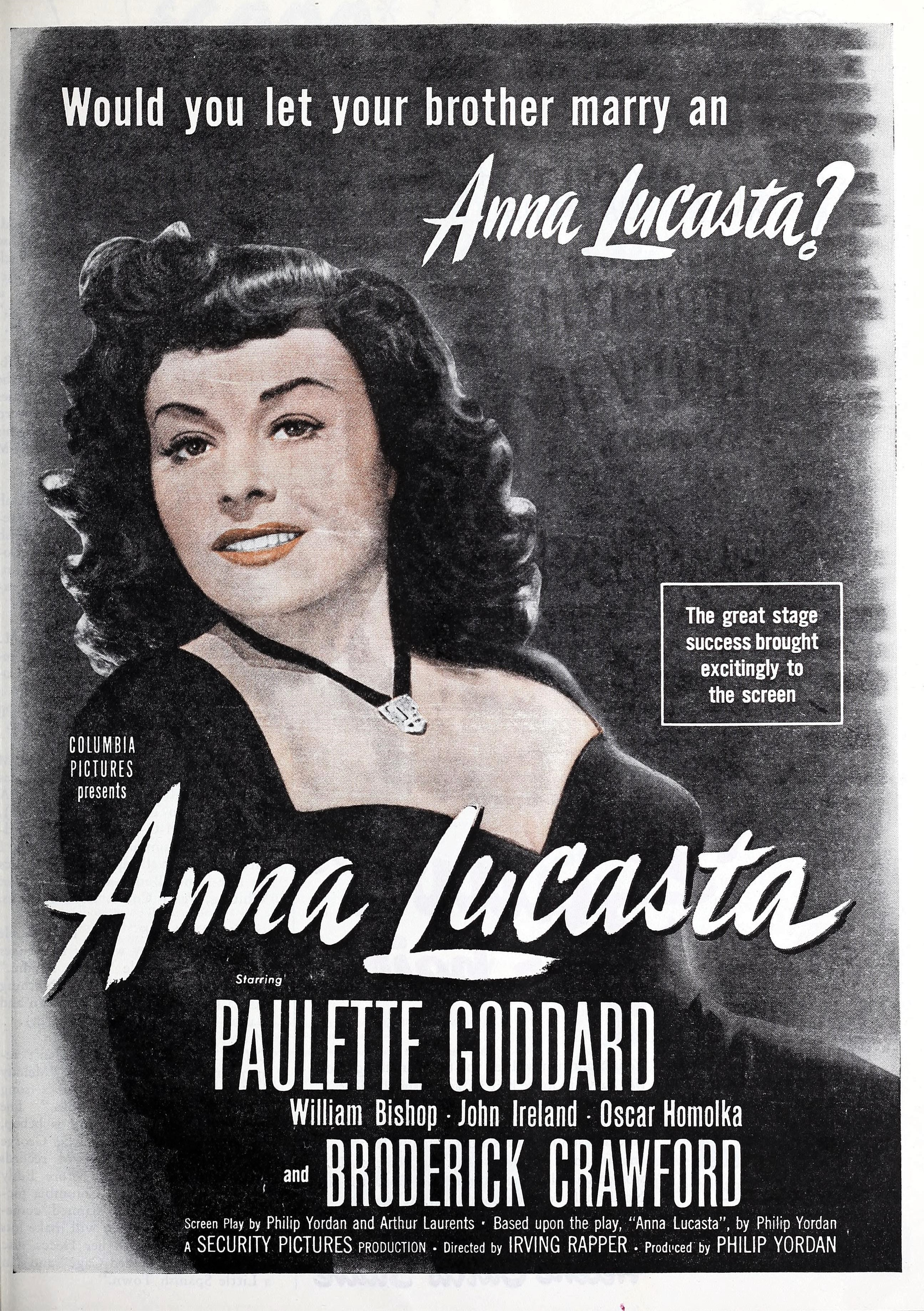
Although the 1949 film Anna Lucasta was inspired by ANT's Broadway hit, it relied on the original 1936 Polish-American play to justify its all-white cast. Another film was released under the same title in 1958, with an all-Black cast.

The company's most successful production Anna Lucasta ultimately led to its demise. Anna Lucasta, which was inspired by Eugene O'Neil's Anna Christie, was "originally conceived as the story of a sordid, impoverished Polish family in a small Pennsylvania town," but Yordan could not find a company to perform it, so he rewrote it to feature a Black family, and it was performed by the ANT in 1944.

According to a notice in the Brooklyn Eagle on March 30, 1944, the sets for that initial production were designed by the American realist painter Michael Lenson, but that has not been verified. Five weeks later, the play opened on Broadway where it launched the career of Ruby Dee and scored star Alice Childress the first Tony nomination for a Black actress.

Nine New York newspaper dailies reviewed the show. They all raved and producers instantly started fighting over who would get the rights to the play. Yordan agreed to sign a Dramatists Guild contract that would make Hill the co-author of Anna Lucasta. This gave Hill a five percent author's royalty.

The ANT itself received few royalties for Anna Lucasta, and the next three ANT plays to appear on Broadway were not successful. As a result, divisions developed within the company, with many determined to repeat the success of Anna Lucasta, at the cost of their earlier emphasis on a "people's theatre", and Hill's own break with the company. From then on, the ANT only featured plays from established white playwrights, and young actors viewed the ANT as a means to break into Broadway productions.

== Mission ==
The ANT had a four-part mission:

1. To develop a permanent acting company trained in the arts and crafts of the theatre that also reflected the special gifts, talents, and attributes of African Americans.
2. To produce plays that honestly, and with integrity, interpreted, illuminated, and criticized contemporary Black life and the concerns of the Black people.
3. To maintain an affiliation with, and provide leadership for, other Black theatre groups throughout the nation.
4. To utilize its resources to develop racial pride in the theatre, rather than racial apathy.

== Constitution ==
When the ANT was first founded in 1940, the group created a 30-page constitution for themselves that reflected the ideals of the Federal Theatre Project. The constitution also drew upon W. E. B. Du Bois's belief that African-American theatre should be by, about, for, and near African Americans.

According to the constitution:

A People's theatre is a very valuable institution. it provides the finest outlet for class emotions that can be organized. It serves as a spur to citizen ambition provides a partly self-supporting source of work and income, and a healthy kind of occupational therapy on a national scale for thousands. Unhappily, we have been trained to think of the theatre mostly in terms of commercial enterprise that is too expensive when it is worthy, and too cheap and boring when it is not. We know it too frequently as an investment for gambling show men, or as a playground for dilettantes and escapists who are unable to withstand the hard realities of life. We need a people's theatre which shall in effect be a national theatre. The people who want a theatre will have to organize it and pay a part of the expense for both its creation and support. Realizing the reluctance of the people to assume this responsibility, the essential burden of stimulating the development of such a project rests upon the shoulders of those individuals who are willing to assume this obligation, those who feel sincerely the call in a genuine quest for the content of theatre art, and by their talent, industry, and profound respect for a theatre they shall create.

== Stage productions ==
- Hits, Bits, and Skits (1940)
- On Strivers' Row by Abram Hill (1940)
- Natural Man by Theodore Browne (1941)
- Three Is a Family by Phoebe Ephron and Henry Ephron (1943)
- Anna Lucasta by Philip Yordan and Abram Hill (1944)
- Garden of Time by Owen Dodson (1945)
- Henry Christophe by Dan Hammersmith (1945)
- Home Is the Hunter by Samuel Kootz (1946)
- Angel Street by Patrick Hamilton (1946)
- Juno and the Paycock by Seán O'Casey (1946)
- You Can't Take It with You by Moss Hart and George Kaufman (1946)
- The Peacemaker by Kurt Unkelbach (1946)
- Tin Top Valley by Walter Carroll (1947)
- The Later Christopher Bean by Sidney Howard (1947)
- Rope by Eugene O'Neill (1947)
- The Show Off by George Kelly (1947)
- Rain by John Colton and Clemence Randolph(1947)
- The Washington Years by Nat Sherman (1948)
- Almost Faithful by Harry Wagstaff Gribble (1948)
- Sojourner Truth by Katherine G. Chaplin (1949)
- Riders to the Sea by John Millington Synge (1949)
- Freight by Kenneth White (1949)

== Notable graduates ==
- Osceola Macarthy Adams
- Harry Belafonte
- Alice Childress
- Alvin Childress
- Ossie Davis
- Ruby Dee
- Roger Furman
- Maxwell Granville
- William Greaves
- Gordon Heath
- Earle Hyman
- Rosetta LeNoire
- Helen Martin
- Sidney Poitier
- Isabel Sanford
- Hilda Simms
- Clarice Taylor

== Gallery ==
(Selection was limited by availability.)

Actress-director Osceola Archer, n.d.

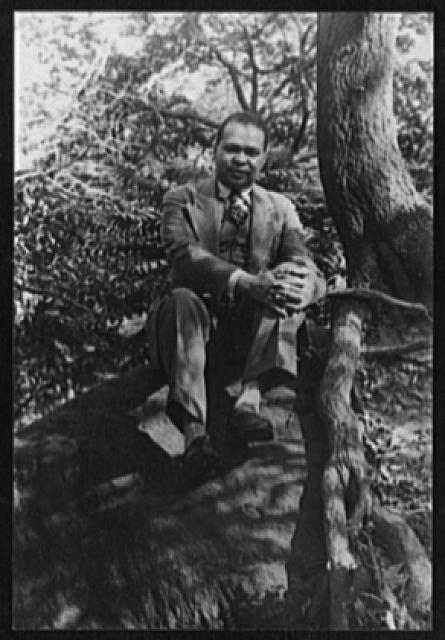
Playwright Countee Cullen in 1948.

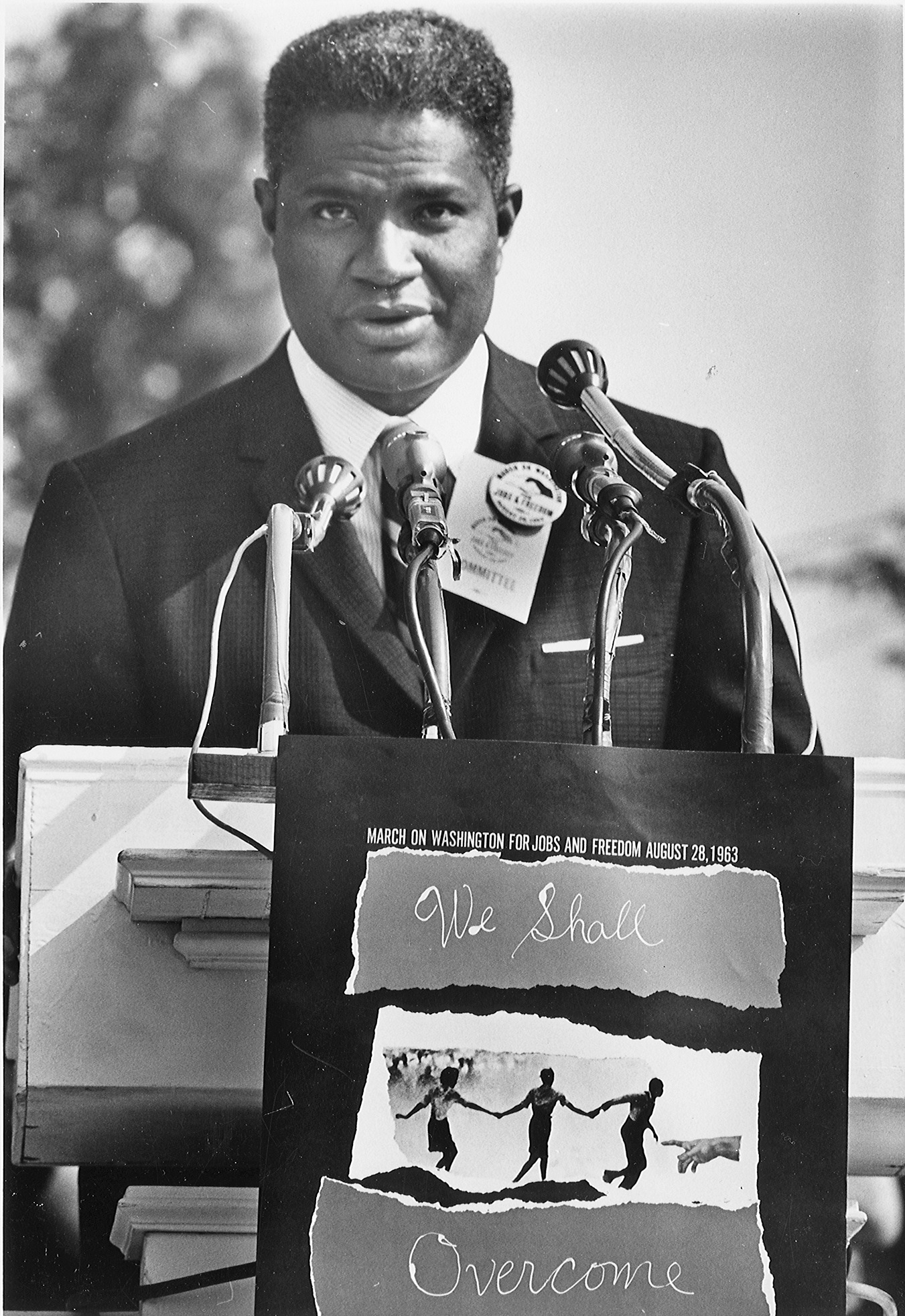
Actor Ossie Davis in 1963.

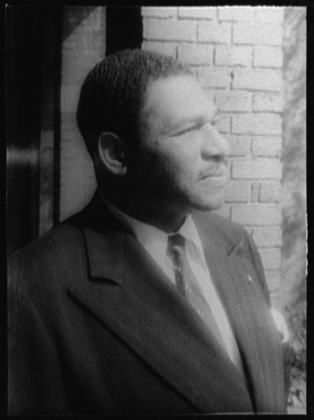
Actor Frederick O'Neal in 1958.

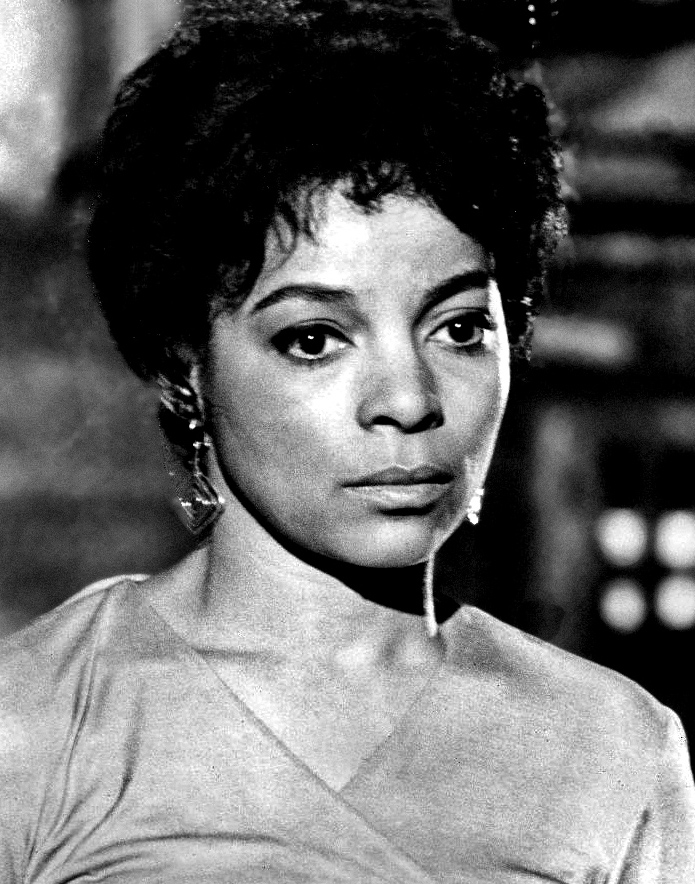
Actress Ruby Dee in 1972.

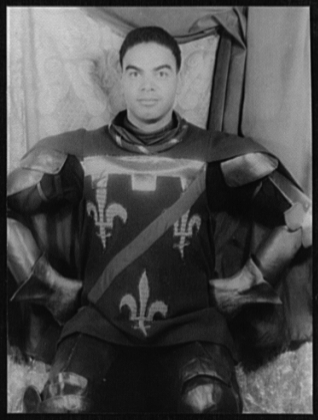
Actor Earle Hyman in 1956.

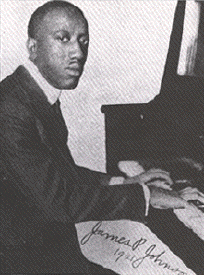
Composer James P. Johnson in 1921.

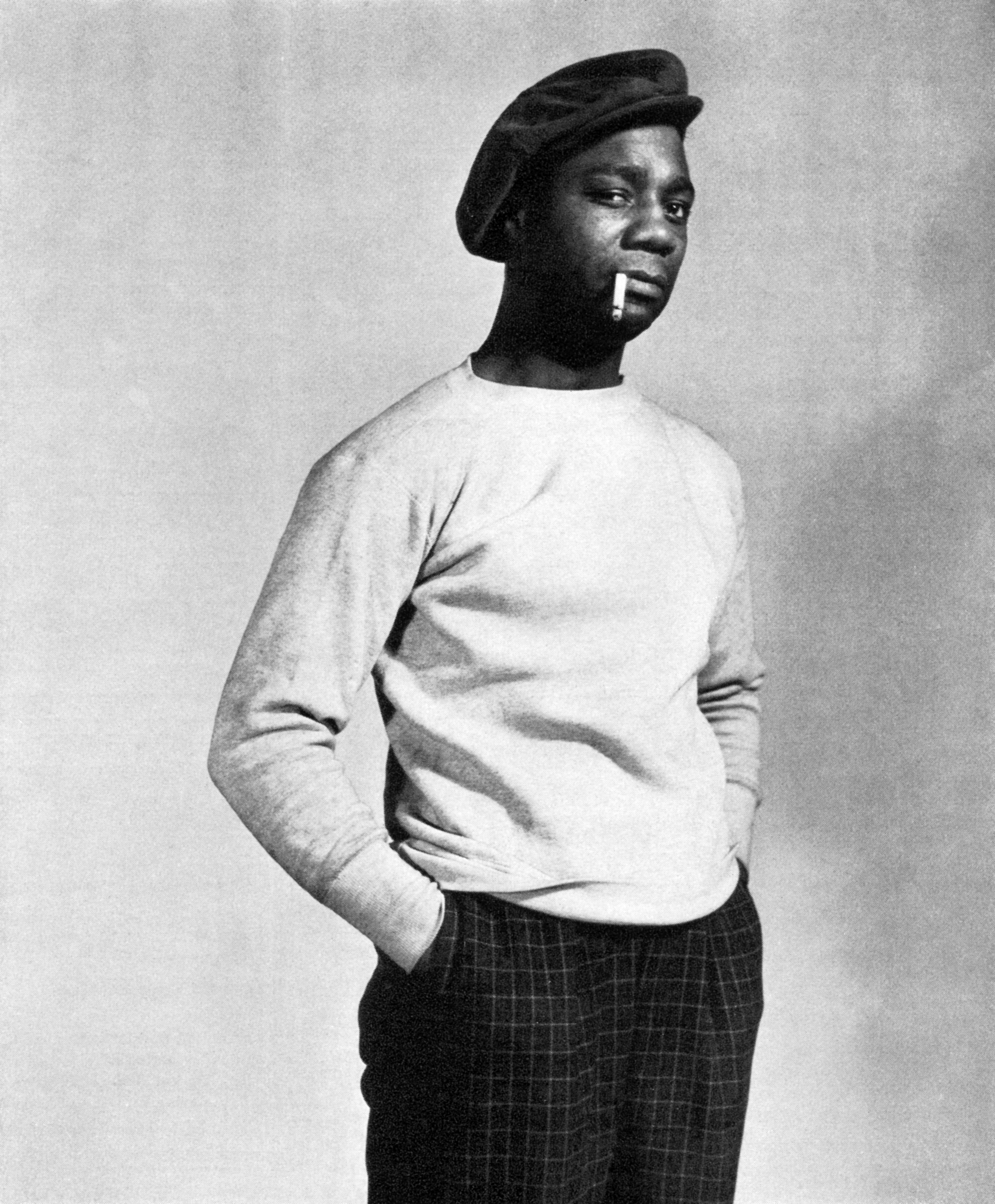
Actor Canada Lee in 1941.

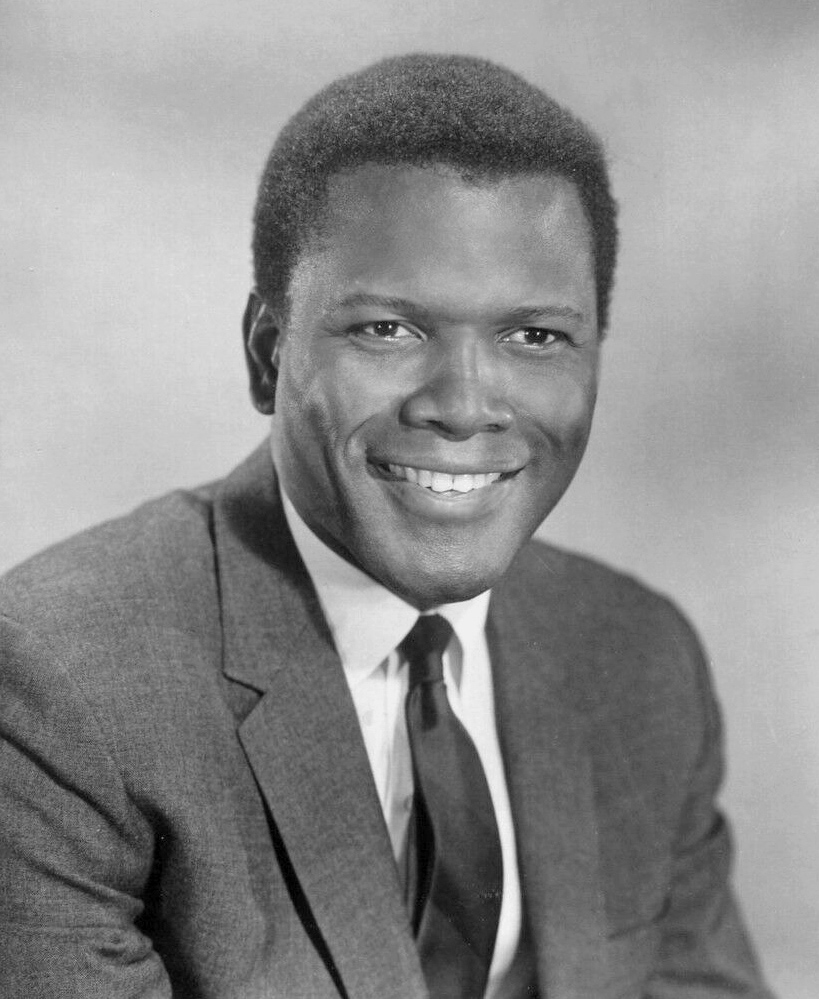
Actor Sidney Poitier in 1968.

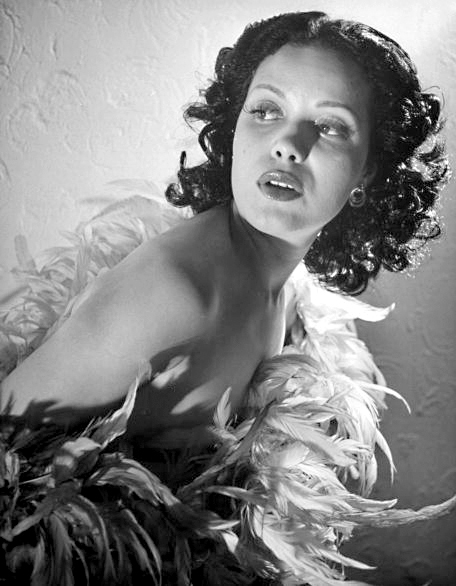
Actress Hilda Sims in 1944.

== Archives ==
- Classix: A living library of rarely seen Black classic plays
- The New York Public Library's Schomburg Center for Research in Black Culture

== See also ==
- Apollo Theater
- Black Arts Movement
- Chitlin' Circuit
- Classical Theatre of Harlem
- Coalition of Theatres of Color
- Coordinating Council for Negro Performers
- The Frogs (an association for Black theater professionals)
- Harlem Renaissance
- Harlem Repertory Theatre
- Lafayette Theatre (Harlem)
- National Black Theatre
- Negro Actor's Guild of America
- Negro Ensemble Company
- New Federal Theatre
- New Heritage Theatre Group
- Paul Robeson Theatre at the Store Front Museum
- Theater companies of the Harlem Renaissance

== Bibliography ==
- Hill, Errol G., and James V. Hatch, A History of African American theatre. United Kingdom: Cambridge University Press, 2003. ISBN 9780521624435
- Hill, Errol, ed. The Theatre of Black Americans. Vol. 2. Englewood Cliffs, NJ: Prentice-Hall, 1980. Print. Twentieth Century Views. ISBN 978-0139127250
- Belafonte, Harry, Interview of Harry Belafonte by Cornel West, June 3, 1996, in Restoring Hope: Conversations on the Future of Black America. Sealey, Kelvin Shawn (ed.), Boston, MA: Beacon Press, 1997. ISBN 978-0807009437
