= Memphis Bound =

1945 American musical

- A New Musical Comedy
- Music: Arthur Sullivan, Don Walker
- Lyrics: W. S. Gilbert, Clay Warnick, Don Walker
- Book: Albert Barker, Sally Benson, W. S. Gilbert
- Setting: "The present" (1945), near Calliboga, Tennessee
- Basis: H.M.S. Pinafore by Gilbert and Sullivan
- Premiere: May 24, 1945: Broadway Theatre

Memphis Bound (usually styled Memphis Bound!) is a 1945 American musical based on the Gilbert and Sullivan opera H.M.S. Pinafore. The score was adapted and augmented by Don Walker and Clay Warnick, with a libretto credited to Albert Barker and Sally Benson, "with gratitude to W. S. Gilbert and Sir Arthur Sullivan." The original production starred an all-black cast including Bill "Bojangles" Robinson, Avon Long, Billy Daniels, Ada Brown, and Sheila Guyse.

== Plot ==
An all-African-American touring company is traveling to Memphis on a showboat, the Calliboga Queen. When the boat is run aground in Tennessee, the company mounts a production of Gilbert and Sullivan's H.M.S. Pinafore to raise funds to get it unstuck. Much of the musical consists of a play within a play, as the company presents a musically updated version of the Gilbert and Sullivan opera; the boat pilot (played by Bill Robinson in the original production) takes a major role as Sir Joseph Porter, First Lord of the Admiralty. Another actor (Avon Long in the original) sings and dances the role of Captain Corcoran, while the part of Josephine goes to an Andrews Sisters-style trio of women from the company chorus (Sheila Guyse, Ida James, and Thelma Carpenter)—each had been promised the role, so they join forces and play it simultaneously. The police arrest the company for performing without a license, and the case is taken to court in a scene involving excerpts from another Gilbert and Sullivan work, Trial by Jury.

== Productions ==
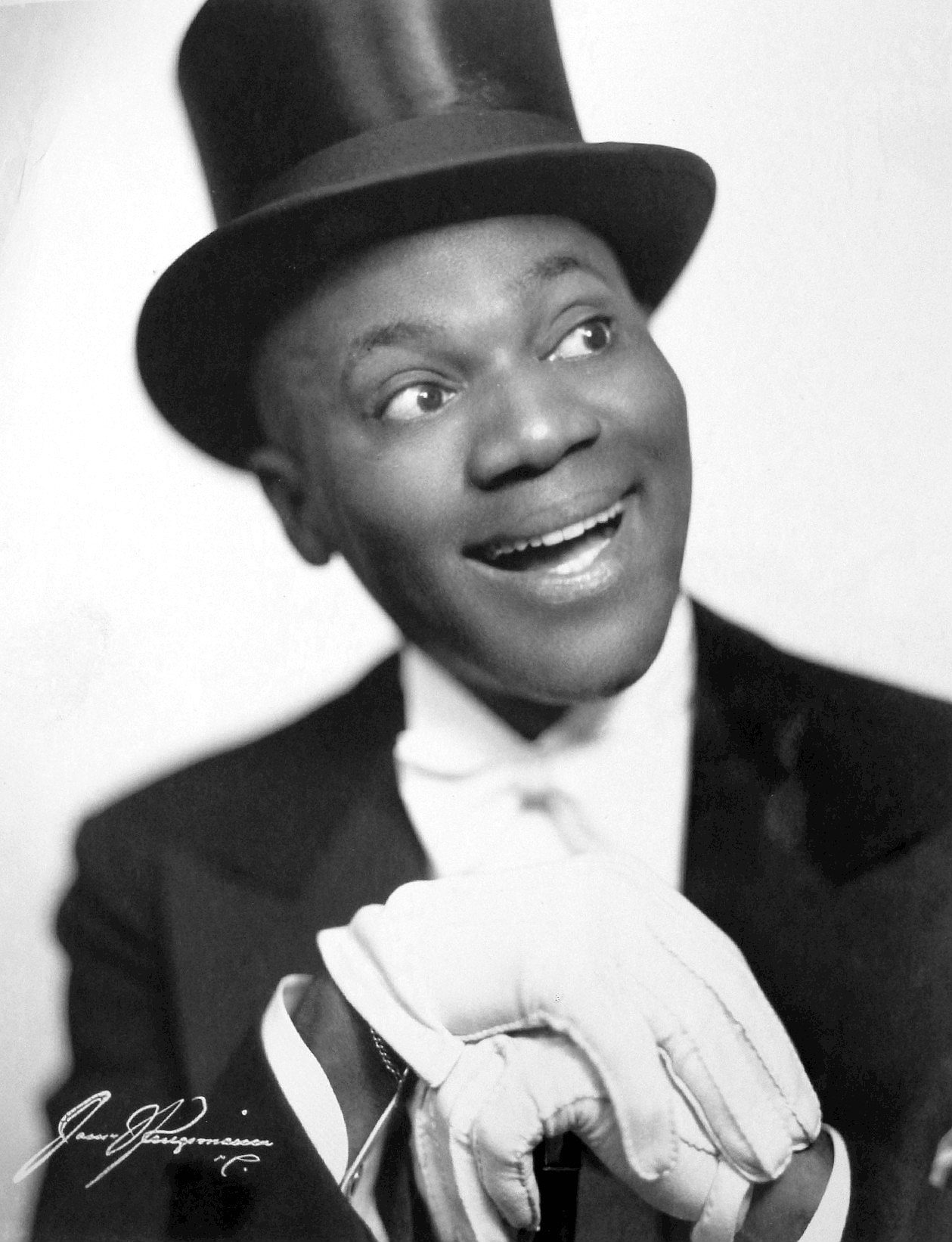
Bill Robinson in 1942

The show was given a pre-Broadway tryout at the Colonial Theatre in Boston, Massachusetts, early in May 1945. The production gave top billing to Bill Robinson and Avon Long. The show then opened at the Broadway Theatre on May 24, 1945.

In 1939, Robinson had starred as the Lord High Executioner in Mike Todd's musical The Hot Mikado, based on Gilbert and Sullivan's The Mikado (another updated version, The Swing Mikado, opened on Broadway almost simultaneously). Memphis Bound marked his return to Broadway, in another vehicle based on Gilbert and Sullivan. John Wildberg, who had successfully presented Philip Yordan's Anna Lucasta with an African-American cast on Broadway the previous year, was producer; Robert Ross directed, assisted by Eva Jessye, with Vinton Freedley credited for "personal supervision" of the show. Memphis, one of numerous Second World War-era Broadway musicals created by white production teams for black casts, was the last such show to appear during the war.

Most of the score was derived from the Gilbert and Sullivan original; the vocal arrangements and updated lyrics were by Clay Warnick, while the orchestrations and score were adapted by Don Walker. The show also included four original songs by Warnick and Walker—"Big Old River," "Stand Around the Bend," "Old Love and Brand New Love," and "Growing Pains"—written in a pastiche of existing styles. (In the show billing, Walker was credited with the new music, and Warnick and Walker shared credit for the new lyrics.) "Growing Pains," an original duet for Robinson and 8-year-old actor Timothy Grace, was strongly flavored by a Duke Ellington sound, while the Gilbert and Sullivan material was arranged as swing music with a boogie-woogie edge.

Robinson interpolated his specialty, a dance on stairs, as a high point of the show. Avon Long, known for playing Sportin' Life in the 1942 Broadway production of Porgy and Bess, provided additional solo dancing, using a full-body movement style contrasting with Robinson's foot-based work.

== Reception ==
John Chapman of the New York Daily News gave the Broadway production a rave review, saying "It has been too many years since I have seen a musical with the zip, the stomp, and the whoosh of Memphis Bound. … It's good-naured as a puppy, and frequently very smart." Wilella Waldorf of the New York Post was more critical of the book, commenting that though the adaptation of H.M.S. Pinafore was "interesting musically and often very funny," the show as a whole was inconsistent, with "no uniform pattern … set for the travesty." Life magazine's anonymous critic highlighted the contributions of Robinson and H.M.S. Pinafore, noting with amusement that both were 67 years old, but added that when neither were featured onstage, "the show gets very dreary." Bob Francis of Billboard magazine similarly praised the Pinafore segments and the stars over the original elements of the book, commenting: "If two actors could put Memphis over for a smash, it should be Robinson and Long. Unfortunately, the task is too heavy for a two-man job." Critics widely praised Robinson's performance and especially his dancing.

During its run, Memphis moved from the Broadway to the Belasco Theatre. It closed on June 23, 1945, after 36 performances, losing money on its original investment. The show was hampered in part due to competition from Hollywood Pinafore, a George S. Kaufman musical comedy drawing on exactly the same Gilbert and Sullivan material. However, Kaufman's version, which opened exactly a week after Memphis, was a much more pronounced critical failure.

"The Nightingale, The Moon and I," one of the numbers closely based on the Gilbert and Sullivan originals, was recorded in the 1990s for the compilation album Life's a Funny Present.

== Notes ==
=== Sources ===
- Dietz, Dan (2015), The Complete Book of 1940s Broadway Musicals, Lanham, Maryland: Rowman & Littlefield, ISBN 9781442245280
- Francis, Bob (June 2, 1945), "Memphis Bound", Billboard, vol. 52, no. 22, pp. 34, 59
- Hischak, Thomas S. (2009), Broadway Plays and Musicals: Descriptions and Essential Facts of More Than 14,000 Shows Through 2007, Jefferson, North Carolina: McFarland & Co., ISBN 9780786453092
- Jones, John Bush (2003), Our Musicals, Ourselves: A Social History of the American Musical Theatre, Hanover: Brandeis University Press, ISBN 9780874519044
- Life magazine (June 25, 1945), "'Memphis Bound': 'Pinafore' and 'Bojangles', both 67 years old, liven Negro musical", Life, vol. 18, no. 26, pp. 57–62
- Mordden, Ethan (1999), Beautiful Mornin': The Broadway Musical in the 1940s, New York: Oxford University Press, ISBN 9780195128512
- Suskin, Steven (1990), Opening Night on Broadway: A Critical Quotebook of the Golden Era of the Musical Theatre, Oklahoma! (1943) to Fiddler on the Roof (1964), New York: Schirmer Books
