= Attles =

Attles is a surname. Notable people with the surname include:

- Al Attles (1936–2024), American basketball player and coach
- Joseph Attles (1903–1990), American actor
