= Philip Yordan =

American screenwriter and producer (1914–2003)

- Yordan in 1988
- Born: April 1, 1914; Chicago, Illinois, U.S.
- Died: March 24, 2003 (aged 88); La Jolla, California, U.S.
- Education: University of Illinois; Chicago-Kent College of Law
- Occupations: Writer; film producer
- Years active: 1946–1994
- Children: 5

Philip Yordan (April 1, 1914 – March 24, 2003) was an American screenwriter, film producer, novelist and playwright. He was a three-time Academy Award nominee, winning Best Story for Broken Lance (1954).

During the 1950s and 1960s, Yordan acted as a front for blacklisted writers although his use of surrogate screenwriters predates the McCarthy era. His actual contributions to the scripts he is credited with writing is controversial and he was known to some as a credit-grabber.

== Early life and education ==
Philip Yordan was born to Polish Jewish immigrants on April 1, 1914, in Chicago. From a young age he had taken an interest in writing. As a teenager, he ran a mail-order beauty supply business out of the family basement. Yordan was an avid fan of detective stories; he contemplated a career as a writer. After graduating from high school, he acted at the Goodman Theatre, before earning degrees from both University of Illinois and Chicago-Kent College of Law.

A common anecdote in Hollywood was that he hired someone else to go through law school for him using his name to get the degree without having to do any of the work, however Yordan himself denied it.

== Career ==
=== Theatre ===
He became dissatisfied with a legal career. He started working at the Goodman Theatre as an actor and began writing stories. He decided to pursue writing, eventually becoming a playwright. He said "I enjoyed reading, and thought that I would write because I hated the idea of a job, of having to go down to an office. The magazine Esquire rejected some short stories with the comment, "Your prose is stilted, but your dialogue is excellent. Why don't you try writing plays?"

Yordan's first play, Any Day Now, a comedy about a family of Polish Americans was staged at a small off-Broadway theatre in 1941. Critic Axel Storm called it "a very bad play very well written and the author will probably get something telling off his chest sooner or later. He's worth watching." Director William Dieterle saw the play and invited Yordan to Hollywood to work on a project Dieterle was making about the history of jazz. By the time Any Day Now was produced Yordan had also written the plays Get off the Earth, Anna Lucasta and Joe Macbeth.

In Los Angeles Yordan did some uncredited writing on The Devil and Daniel Webster (1941), directed by Dieterle, and then was credited as co writer on the jazz project, Syncopation (1942), directed by Dieterle at RKO. He was paid $40 a week.

Yordan served for a few months in the army, worked briefly at Columbia Pictures as a staff writer and a play of his The Honest Gambler was given a short run at a theatre in 1943.

In 1937 Yordan had written a play based on Eugene O'Neill's Anna Christie, adapted to be about a Polish American family and titled Anna Lucasta. Later he found out that Abram Hill had rewritten the same play for the American Negro Theater in New York. The lighter, more comedic production had received critical accolades. Yordan received financial backing and signed an agreement with Hill and producer John Wildberg. Anna Lucasta was revised with a gala opening at the Mansfield Theatre on August 30, 1944. It was a tremendous success, running for a record 957 performances and leading to two film adaptations. Yordan had hired several writers to rewrite Anna Lucasta before the play premiered on Broadway. In 1947, Lee Richardson, Antoinette Perry and Brock Pemberton sued Yordan for not paying them. The American Negro Theater was contracted to receive five percent of all production rights and two percent of the subsidiary rights for Anna Lucasta if the play went on the road with a different cast, however they received considerably less than that for the Broadway show and none at all for the tour or any of the films. When Anna Lucasta went to Broadway, the new production retained only a few of the ANT actors.

Yordan returned to theatre to work on a musical version of The Honest Gambler called Windy City. It toured out of town but shut in Chicago before it reached New York. He wrote a play Road to the Noonday Sun which was not producer. Thereafter Yordan focused his attention on Hollywood.

=== King Brothers and Nero Films ===
Yordan wrote a script for King Brothers Productions, Dillinger, a biopic of gangster John Dillinger. The King Brothers considered this was too expensive for them to produce, so they suggested he write something less expensive. He came up with a melodrama, The Unknown Guest (1943).

The Kings liked his work and hired Yordan to write Johnny Doesn't Live Here Anymore (1944) and When Strangers Marry (1944), although Dennis Cooper wrote the first draft which Yordan then rewrote. They all did well enough for Yordan to be able to make Dillinger (1945). Reportedly, he wrote the script with William Castle and Robert Tasker, neither of whom received any credit. The screenplay earned Yordan an Oscar nomination, a first for Monogram Pictures. He was paid $1,500 for the script plus a third of the profits.

Yordan wrote Woman Who Came Back (1945) for Republic Pictures and Whistle Stop (1946) for producer Seymour Nebenzal's Nero Films, starring Ava Gardner. Yordan was an associate producer on the latter; he was paid $50,000 plus fifty percent of the profits. He did uncredited work on Why Girls Leave Home (1945). The King Brothers used him again for Suspense (1946), a big budget vehicle for Monogram. He wrote The Chase (1946) for Nebenzal/Nero. In 1946 it was estimated he earned a million dollars.

In the 1940s Yordan wrote a play Joe MacBeth, which he adapted into a script which came close to being made several times. It did not reach the screen until 1955.

Yordan wrote several subsequent movies for the Kings including Bad Men of Tombstone (1949), Drums in the Deep South (1951), and Mutiny (1952).

According to Patrick McGilligan, Yordan thrived in Hollywood.

It was the perfect jungle for expression of his genius at supplying the demand. In short order, he became known among producers as a bravura "spitballer," that is, one who can talk a good script (and one has only to meet Yordan to appreciate how spellbinding is his vernacular). He became a much-sought-after script doctor and coarse dialogue specialist, often arriving at the 11th hour to contribute the famed lightning-quick "Yordan touch." A lot of his work went uncredited.

=== Producer ===
Yordan was producer on Whistle Stop (1946) which he wrote.

In 1947 Yordan and Mike Frankovich announced they had formed their own company, originally called Yordan Enterprises. The first film adaption in 1949 was produced by Yordan with a Polish American family as in his original version. The other, made in 1958 had an all-black cast as the American Negro Theater production, and starred Eartha Kitt, Sammy Davis Jr., and Henry Scott. Only Yordan retained a writing credit for both films.

In 1948 Yordan formed a company with actor Bob Cummings and Eugene Frenke called United California Productions. This was a separate entity to Yordan Enterprises. United California announced various projects but wound up soon after the failure of its first and only movie, Let's Live a Little.

In 1949, Yordan announced he would write and produce The Big Blonde based on a story by Dorothy Parker. Irving Lerner was going to direct. It was not made – the rights to the story went to Mark Robson's company.

Yordan Enterprises was eventually renamed Security Pictures. Security Pictures made The Big Combo (1955), a co-production with the company of star Cornel Wilde; Yordan wrote the script and produced with Sidney Harmon.

Yordan was a writer-producer for The Harder They Fall (1956) directed by Mark Robson.

For Security Pictures he produced The Wild Party (1956) and wrote Four Boys and a Gun (1957). He and Harmon bought Man on Spikes but it was not made. In 1956 he was reportedly working on a script for Mario Lanza and Anthony Mann that was not made. He provided the story for Street of Sinners (1957) for Security as well as Man in War (1957) and God's Little Acre (1958). Yordan adapted Little Man Big World by W. R. Burnett for Robert Ryan to star for Security, but the film was not made. In 1957 Security and Milton Sperling purchased the King Studios. He wrote and produced Day of the Outlaw (1959) at Security

In 1959 Yordan and Harmon announced they would make four films for Columbia. They were going to start with a World War II story, Kingdom of Man. The films were not made. Yordan produced the TV series Assignment: Underwater (1960–61). He also made some uncredited contributions to the script of The Time Machine (1960).

=== Major studios ===
Yordan's first credit for a major studio was House of Strangers (1949) which he adapted from a Jerome Weidman novel for Fox. Yordan had been fired by producer Sol C. Siegel after an incomplete first draft which Siegel felt wasn't working. Yordan's unfinished script was rewritten by director Joseph L. Mankiewicz, who replaced Yordan's dialogue with his own. He directed the film using his own revised screenplay. When the Screen Writers Guild decided that it should be listed as a shared credit, Mankiewicz angrily refused to split and Yordan was awarded sole credit.

For Walter Wanger he did The Black Book (1949). He did some uncredited work on Panic in the Streets (1950) and No Way Out (1950), both for Fox. He wrote Edge of Doom (1950) for Sam Goldwyn, based on a story by Goldwyn. He did Detective Story (1951) for William Wyler at Paramount and provided the story (along with Sidney Harmon) for Mara Maru (1952) at Warners. Detective Story earned Yordan an Oscar nomination.

Yordan adapted Houdini (1953) for Paramount and Blowing Wild (1953) for Warner Bros. In 1953 he sold The Men from Earth to Milton Sperling.

Yordan wrote The Man from Laramie (1955) for James Stewart and director Anthony Mann, the last film Stewart and Mann made together. Yordan wrote Conquest of Space (1955) for Haskin and did another for Mann, The Last Frontier (1955).

In 1955, he won an Academy Award for Broken Lance. It was a remake of 1949's House of Strangers, and he did not write single word. He won his Oscar for Best Original Story for material in the story files that had formed the basis for House of Strangers, salvaged, provided a Western context, and refurbished by producer-writer Michael Blankfort.

Yordan produced and adapted Budd Schulberg's novel The Harder They Fall (1956), which was directed by Mark Robson.

In February 1955 Jerry Wald of Columbia announced they would make a film based on the Krakatoa explosion written by Yordan, under Yordan's new contract with Columbia. The film would not be made until over a decade later. In January 1957 he sold a story Diamond in the Rough to Jerry Wald.

At Fox Yordan wrote No Down Payment (1957), The Bravados (1958) and The Fiend Who Walked the West (1958) (a remake of Kiss of Death). He wrote The Bramble Bush (1960) for Warners.

=== Front for blacklistees ===
Yordan struck a deal with screenwriter Ben Maddow who was having difficulty getting work because of the left-wing associations. They were to split the money down the middle, with Yordan assuming sole credit. Maddow wrote Man Crazy which Yordan and Sidney Harmon produced for Security Pictures and The Naked Jungle which was directed by Byron Haskin at Paramount.

Maddow would go to write several scripts for him including Men in War (1957) and possibly God's Little Acre (1958) as well as Yordan's only novel, Man of the West on which the 1957 film Gun Glory (1957) was based. (Yordan disputed the screenwriter' contribution to God's Little Acre.)

Although he also spoke well of Yordan, in an interview Maddow once remembered his anger and astonishment at passing through England and discovering a Penguin edition of Man of the West for which he had not been compensated.

Yordan received sole credit for Johnny Guitar (1954) for Republic Pictures, which became a major cult film, although it is unclear how much Yordan actually contributed to the final script. Ben Maddow claimed to have written the entire Johnny Guitar screenplay, but recanted after seeing the picture years later. Roy Chanslor, the author of the original novel and a prolific screenwriter himself, also wrote a screenplay draft.

=== End of Hollywood career ===
In 1960, he wrote and produced Studs Lonigan (1960), although blacklisted writers Arnaud D'Usseau and Bernard Gordon did much of the actual writing. In February 1960, Yordan was announced as screenwriter for Bryna Productions' spectacle film Montezuma, though Dalton Trumbo, who had worked on several scripts for the independent film company, was later revealed as the actual writer.

In the late 1950s, Yordan got two scripts mixed up and delivered a Fox script to producer Milton Sperling at Warner Bros., dropping the Warners script off to Darryl F. Zanuck at Fox. As the writer was under contract to Fox, Zanuck threatened to blackball Yordan at all the major studios. In 1959 Sperling fired Yordan when the screenwriter delivered his script for The Rise and Fall of Legs Diamond (1960). Yordan's secretary claimed that she had written it. Confronted by Sperling, Yordan argued that she had taken down his words and been given a bonus for her work however he had admitted enough to warrant his dismissal from the project Sperling then hired a new writer. Yordan then did uncredited writing on Murder by Contract and The Lost Missile.

Columbia studio head Sam Briskin hired Yordan, provided he keep an office on the lot and that his authorship of any scripts would be guaranteed. However, Yordan allegedly continued to shuttle scripts around town and rarely appeared at Columbia. Caught violating the terms of his contract, Yordan was forced to return the $25,000 he had already been paid. He was barred from Columbia, as well as nearly every other studio in Hollywood.

=== Europe ===
Unable to work in Hollywood, Yordan found opportunity in Spain with independent producer Samuel L. Bronston. Yordan's association with Bronston began when he worked on the $10 million epic King of Kings (1961), directed by Nicholas Ray. Bronston engaged him to fix the script for the film and Yordan then hired Ray Bradbury to write the voice-over narration, used an anonymous Italian writer for the script. He retained sole writing credit on the finished film.

Yordan stayed with Bronston to write El Cid (1961) for Mann, although it is more likely the actual scripting was done by blacklistees Ben Barzman and Bernard Gordon. Yordan was also announced as writing a script for Bronston about the building of the Eiffel Tower.

Yordan was credited on The Day of the Triffids (1963) but he was a "front" for Bernard Gordon. He continued to work regularly for Bronston: 55 Days at Peking (1963), directed by Ray and Guy Green, with Yordan producing, contributing ideas and being a script front for Gordon (based on a story Yordan had developed for Jerry Wald); The Fall of the Roman Empire (1964), directed by Mann; and Circus World (1964), directed by Henry Hathaway (mostly written by Gordon).

Both 55 Days at Peking and The Fall of the Roman Empire were box-offices failures and Bronston declared bankruptcy. In addition to the production company's immense production costs and expense accounts, Yordan and producer Michael Waszynski were reportedly diverting large sums for their own purposes.

In 1963 Security Pictures announced they would make ten films for Allied Artists over two and a half years, including The Tribe That Lost Its Head; Gretta, based on a book by Erskine Caldwell; a Western called Bad Man's River; and a science fiction film Crack in the World. Many of these were not made. For Security Pictures, Yordan produced The Thin Red Line (1964) and Crack in the World (1965).

Security combined with Cinerama to make Battle of the Bulge (1965), which he produced; Custer of the West (1967) and Krakatoa: East of Java (1968) which he produced. Gordon recalled collaborating on the first draft of the Bulge script with Yordan, a first during their lengthy association Gordon and Julian Zimet wrote Custer of the West

Security went on to make The Royal Hunt of the Sun (1969), which Yordan wrote and produced. He wrote and produced Captain Apache (1971) with Sperling, and wrote Bad Man's River (1971).

=== Final films ===
Yordan returned to the US in the 1970s. His later credits include Brigham (1977) (which he co-produced), Cataclysm (1980), The Dark Side to Love (1984), Night Train to Terror (1985), Cry Wilderness (1987) (also co produced), Bloody Wednesday (1987) (which he co produced), and The Unholy (1988). His final scripts included Marilyn Alive and Behind Bars (1992), and Dead Girls Don't Tango (1992).

== Accolades ==
- Nominated for an Academy Award for Best Writing, Screenplay for Detective Story (1951), and for Best Writing, Original Screenplay for Dillinger (1945).
- Won an Academy Award for Best Writing, Motion Picture Story for Broken Lance (1954), a remake, reset in the West, of the House of Strangers, which was credited solely to Yordan but written in large part by the film's director Joseph L. Mankiewicz who refused to share a co-writing credit.
- Won a 1952 Edgar Award for Best Motion Picture Screenplay, for Detective Story (along with credited cowriter Robert Wyler, and Sidney Kingsley, the author of the original stage play).

== Personal life ==
He was married four times. He was married to actress-turned-casting director Marilyn Nash from 1946 to 1952, and to actress Faith Clift from 1964 to 2003.

=== Political views ===
Yordan was self-described as 'apolitical'. He claims to never have read a newspaper until he was 50, and his use of Hollywood blacklistees was believed to be not out of political commitment but because "he got the better people cheaper".

He reportedly once told screenwriter Bernard Gordon that "It's Jews like you who ruined the motion picture industry with this anti-hero shit."

However Yordan also claimed "In all my pictures there is the theme of the loneliness of the common man. But he has an inner resource that allows him to survive in society. He doesn't cry, he doesn't beg, he doesn't ask favours. He lives and dies in dignity."

== Death ==
Yordan died in La Jolla, California on March 24, 2003, at the age of 88. Upon his death he was survived by his fourth wife, five children, and two grandchildren.

== Appraisal ==
Producer Milton Sperling later said "Don’t let anyone tell you he couldn’t write. He could write exceedingly well. . . . He had a kind of Jungian memory of film, a kind of collective unconscious, a memory bank that would work for him in any given situation. He could have been one of the best writers. He had ability, no question about it. But his greed overcame his creative talent."

Bernard Gordon said "He wasn't a great writer. But he knew how to put the kind of showmanship material into films that made them financially successful and popular."

Eddie Muller wrote "What made Yordan's scripts distinctive was his sometimes subtle, sometimes subversive, way of twisting genre conventions to keep things lively and unpredictable. His screenplays for 'The Chase,' 'Johnny Guitar' and 'The Big Combo' are quirky to the point of outrageousness. If the premise was slight, you could trust Yordan to goose it with plenty of 'business'."
