= The Model and the Marriage Broker =

1951 film by George Cukor

- Directed by: George Cukor
- Written by: Charles Brackett; Richard L. Breen; Walter Reisch
- Produced by: Charles Brackett
- Starring: Jeanne Crain; Scott Brady; Thelma Ritter
- Cinematography: Milton R. Krasner
- Edited by: Robert L. Simpson
- Music by: Cyril J. Mockridge
- Distributed by: Twentieth Century-Fox
- Release date: December 30, 1951 (Los Angeles)
- Running time: 103 minutes
- Country: United States
- Language: English
- Box office: $1.15 million (U.S. rentals)

The Model and the Marriage Broker is a 1951 American romantic comedy film directed by George Cukor, produced by Charles Brackett and starring Jeanne Crain, Scott Brady and Thelma Ritter. The film was nominated for an Academy Award for Best Costume Design.

== Plot ==
Through her company called Contacts and Contracts, Mae Swasey works to bring couples together. She also frequently plays pinochle with her friend Doberman, a businessman who rents space in the same office building. Her struggles with the business aspects of her company are compounded when the marriage plans of her client Ina to radiographer Matt Hornbeck end in disaster and Ina's mother refuses to pay a $500 commission.

Mae's purse is accidentally swapped for a lookalike by fashion model Kitty Bennett. Searching for something to identify its owner, Mae reads a letter from Kitty's boyfriend apologizing for failing to mention that he is married, although he wants to continue to see her. When Mae and Kitty meet to exchange purses, Kitty rejects Mae's advice to dump her boyfriend. Kitty later visits Mae to apologize and seek relationship advice. When the boyfriend arrives during a rain storm to collect Kitty, Mae sends him away and convinces Kitty to stay at her place to keep her from him. In the morning, Mae fools Kitty to believe that Kitty may have swallowed an earring in her omelette, a pretense to have Kitty meet Matt.

Kitty and Matt fall in love, but when Kitty learns how Mae orchestrated their introduction and is pressuring Matt to propose, she ends their budding romance and excoriates Mae. Badly shaken, Mae leaves for a health spa to collect her thoughts. Before she can depart, Mae is ambushed by middle-aged woman Emmy Swasey, whom Mae has been trying to avoid. Twenty years earlier, Emmy stole Mae's husband, and now that she is recently widowed and lonely, Emmy wants Mae to find her a man. Mae declines, rattled by Kitty's harsh display.

Not knowing that Mae has left town, Kitty goes to her office to apologize. While there, she meets Mae's socially awkward client Mr. Johannson, who needs relationship help. Doberman, who is also seeking Mae, tells Kitty how badly she had hurt Mae. Before she can leave Mae's office, Kitty meets attractive and wealthy Canadian bachelor Dan Chancellor and schemes to pair him with Mae.

When Mae returns, she meets Dan and a romance begins. She reconciles with Kitty but learns that meeting Dan was Kitty's attempt at matchmaking. Mae realizes that she will never be lonely as long as she has people to help, but she would be very lonely stuck with Dan in Canada. Mae then realizes that Emmy would be a natural match for Dan and plots to bring them together. Matt and Kitty reunite and plan to marry. At Mae's office, Doberman offers himself as a suitor as they play pinochle.

== Cast ==
- Jeanne Crain as Kitty Bennett
- Scott Brady as Matt Hornbeck
- Thelma Ritter as Mae Swasey
- Zero Mostel as George Wixted
- Michael O'Shea as Doberman
- Helen Ford as Emmy Swasey
- Frank Fontaine as Hjalmer Johannson
- Dennie Moore as Bea Gingras
- John Alexander as Mr. Perry
- Jay C. Flippen as Dan Chancellor
- Nancy Kulp as Hazel Gingras
- Kathryn Card as Mrs. Kuschner
- Maudie Prickett as Delia Seaton
- Ken Christy as Mr. Kuschner
- Shirley Mills as Ina Kuschner

== Production ==
Screenwriter Walter Reisch later said: "[The film] worked like a million dollars. Fox production head Darryl Zanuck loved the picture so much that I don't think he eliminated one frame. I don't remember one marginal note in a script of 140 pages. We came in on budget, and Cukor's work was lovely, sensitive. We had a big success, and the reason The Model and the Marriage Broker didn't score an even bigger success was because it came just at the start of the age of CinemaScope and color, and that story certainly did not lend itself to CinemaScope and color. It was very intimate ... But when it was finished ... Zanuck was so involved in CinemaScope and had put so much money and publicity into CinemaScope that he simply treated this picture as a stepchild."

== Reception ==
In a contemporary review for The New York Times, critic Bosley Crowther wrote:

There is nothing particularly funny, so far as this reviewer can see, about a clumsy, unfortunate person who has to operate through a frankly commercial match-maker to find someone to wed. Such misfits, in our estimation, are less humorous than just plain sad. And that is why ·our enthusiasm ... is less than it might well be if there weren't so much emphasis on such persons at the outset of this film. ... Mr. Brackett and his coauthors are no slouches with the funny words. They have written some truly sparkling dialogue for Miss Ritter and the rest. ... But, as usual, it is Miss Ritter who runs away with the show, particularly when she is able to get free of the undertow. Her wised-up air, her cynicism disguising a heart of gold, her barrel-house voice, her sudden radiance have never been better employed. If all of this well-intended picture were as good as it finally gets, it would be—Well what's l the use of dreaming? It's a pleasure, in short, withal.

Critic Edwin Schallert of the Los Angeles Times wrote: "Were it not for somewhat dilatory approach to a slight story, The Model and the Marriage Broker might have arrived on the screen with a brighter aspect than it offers. Not that this film is negligible as a humorous excursion, but it is long drawn out for its subject, and too fitful in its humor. The Model and the Marriage Broker is designed for laughs, which should justify its popular acceptance, even though it is not wholly satisfying."
