= Georgia Burke =

African-American actress, active 1928–1960s

- Born: Georgia Burke; February 27, 1878; La Grange or Atlanta, Georgia
- Died: November 28, 1985 (aged 107); Manhattan, New York City
- Occupation: Actress
- Years active: 1928 – 1960s

Georgia Burke (February 27, 1878 — November 28, 1985) was an American actress who had performed on television, radio, and Broadway theatre between 1928 and the 1960s. In 1934 Burke made her debut in Broadway in They Shall Not Die, and in 1944 she won a Donaldson Award as the third choice for Best Supporting Actress in Edward Chodorov's play, Decision. Burke had performed in the 1952 U.S. State Department-sponsored international production of Porgy and Bess and had taken a role as a nurse in the radio program When a Girl Marries, which had been broadcast for 18 years. She had also performed in the 1944 Broadway production of Anna Lucasta and its second film counterpart in 1958.

Burke has been credited as one of the early appearances of the "stereotyped humorous black maid" in entertainment since her appearance in the radio soap opera Betty and Bob.

She died in 1985 at the age of 107, at the De Witt Nursing Home in Manhattan.

== Early life and career ==
Burke was born on February 27, 1878, in La Grange or Atlanta, Georgia, to a minister and a nurse. She attended Claflin University and New Orleans University and worked as a public school teacher in Wilson, North Carolina. Due to a slapping incident by superintendent Charles L. Coon against another teacher, Burke, along with other coloured teachers at the school, protested the incident by resigning from her teaching position and continued teaching at another school. Burke later moved to New York City, where she attended Columbia University in 1929.

During a visit to Lew Leslie's first rehearsal of Blackbirds of 1928, a friend of Burke's urged her to sing St. Louis Blues in front of the rehearsal cast, and—upon hearing her voice—Leslie persuaded her to join the choir for Blackbirds of 1928. She was given a year's leave from teaching but never returned to her teaching career.

== Filmography ==
=== Television ===
- The Big Story
- Hallmark Hall of Fame: The Little Foxes (1956)
- ABC Theater - If You Give a Dance, You Gotta Pay the Band

=== Film ===
- Anna Lucasta

=== Theatre ===
- Blackbirds of 1928
- Decision - 1944
- The Grass Harp
- Porgy and Bess
- Five Star Final
- Savage Rhythm
- Anna Lucasta
- In Abraham's Bosom
- Old Man Satan
- They Shall Not Die
- Mamba's Daughters
- Cabin in the Sky
- No Time for Comedy
- Interlock
- The Sun Field
- Mandingo
- Tambourines to Glory
- The Wisteria Trees

=== Radio ===
- John Henry: Black River Giant
- When a Girl Marries
- New World A-Comin'
