= Virgil J. Richardson =

Virgil J. Richardson (December 14, 1916 - May 15, 2004) was a Tuskegee Airman and an actor working in both the United States and Mexico. He was a founding member of the American Negro Theatre.

== Biography ==
Richardson was born on December 14, 1916 in Center Point, Arkansas and was later raised in Texarkana, Texas. He graduated from Dunbar High School and went on to Wiley College where he was encouraged to go into acting.

Richardson moved to New York in 1937 where he pursued acting. He studied at the New Theatre School and was a student of Doris Sorrell. His first job was as an understudy for Canada Lee in Big White Fog. Richardson became involved with the American Negro Theatre (ANT) as a founding member He played in the ANT production of On Stravers Row and in 1940, took over Lee's part in Big White Fog. ANT also had a radio show on WNEW where Richardson played several roles.

Richardson was drafted into the United States Army in 1941. In 1942, he was part of the largest-to-date class to graduate from the Tuskegee Army Air Field. In 1944, Richardson was awarded an Air Medal. He flew 63 combat missions during his tour of duty and was discharged from the military in 1945. He shortly returned to New York to pursue acting again.

After the ANT disbanded in 1949, Richardson continued to work in radio. In the summer of 1950, he first came to Mexico, arriving in Acapulco first and moving to Mexico City. In Mexico, he found a refreshingly different take on racial relations, compared to the United States.

He had roles in Tarzan and Sheena films that were shot in Mexico City. In 1966, he had a speaking role in Su Execlencia.

Richardson returned to the United States in 1997, settling in West Columbia, Texas. He died on May 15, 2004.
