= Osceola Archer =

American actress and fashion designer (1890–1983)

- Born: Osceola Marie Macarthy; June 13, 1890; Albany, Georgia, U.S.
- Died: November 20, 1983 (aged 93); New York, New York, U.S.
- Education: Howard University, B.A.,1913; New York University M.A., 1936
- Occupations: Actress, drama teacher, theatre director, fashion designer
- Years active: 1913–1970s

Osceola Marie Adams (née Macarthy; June 13, 1890 – November 11, 1983), known professionally as Osceola Archer, was an American actress and fashion designer who was one of the first Black actresses to appear on Broadway in Between Two Worlds in 1934. She was director of some three dozen productions at the Putnam County Playhouse, about which actor Carl Harms noted she was likely also the first African-American director of summer stock.

Adams was known as one of the Howard University student co-founders of the Delta Sigma Theta sorority. It was founded the same year as the women's 1913 suffragette march on Washington, which Adams attended.

== Performing arts ==
A one-time clothing designer at Chicago's J. Reinhardt firm, Adams' passion for the performing arts led to her graduate degree in the field, nearly 25 years after she completed college, as well as a career as an actress that spanned radio, film and television and, above all, theatre. Her stage performances included work at the National Theater in The Crucible and Ring Around the Moon, appearances in a New York Shakespeare Festival production and multiple Broadway productions including The Emperor Jones with Paul Robeson, Arthur Miller's Broadway version of The Crucible, and such plays as The Guide, Debut, the Cat Screams, Panic and Between Two Worlds.

As the Director of the Studio Theatre School at the American Negro Theatre (ANT), Adams taught students like Sidney Poitier and Harry Belafonte. That experience was complemented by her nearly decade-long involvement with the Putnam County Playhouse, during which Adams directed nearly three dozen plays, alongside Lee Marvin, Isabel Sanford and Mike Nichols. For all that, the capstone of her directing career may have been a 1948 command performance of Sojourner Truth at the ANT for First Lady Eleanor Roosevelt in 1948.

In 1973, Delta Sigma Theta created "The Osceola" to recognize distinguished achievement in the Arts in Adams' honor and, in 1978, the Audelco Recognition Awards honored her as an "Outstanding Pioneer"on behalf of the Black community in the performing arts.

Adams appeared on radio, television, film and, of course, theatre throughout her career, but in her last decade she turned to commercials, which she continued to perform in until age 88.

== Howard University ==
Adams was a leader in Howard's Dramatic Club where she matriculated as part of Howard University's Class of 1913, and also studied ancient Greek and philosophy.

On January 13, 1913, she was one of 22 women who co-founded the Alpha chapter of Delta Sigma Theta sorority at Howard University. As documented in the Suffragists in Washington, D.C.: The 1913 Parade and the Fight for the Vote, Adams and her 21 co-founders attended the suffragette march, paving the way for future Black political activism despite their confinement to a segregated section during the event.

A closer look at the facts determined that only the seniors of sorority marched and did so as the women of Howard University. Mary Church Terrell, best known as an advocate for women’s rights was made an honorary member of Delta Sigma Theta in 1919 and marched as a woman in the college section.

After graduation, Adams and co-founder Marguerite Young Alexander helped form a chapter in Chicago, Illinois. She also later served as national treasurer. The organization has since formed "713 chapters and a membership of 100,000 college women. It devotes much of its energy to community service programs."

Adams is also known for "promoting equal opportunity for blacks and other minorities," in Actors Equity, and her work with the American Theatre Wing of the Stage Door Canteen during World War II. Delta Sigma Theta later named an award in her honor, for members who contributed to the arts and drama.

After graduating from Howard, Osceola married Numa Pompilius Garfield Adams, a chemistry professor, member of Alpha Phi Alpha, and the first African-American Dean of Howard Medical School. They moved to Chicago in 1921. She also taught at Bennett College. Osceola later moved to New York City where she taught at the American Negro Theatre for nine years, and served as director of the Putnam Country Theater in New York City.

== Teaching ==
- 1937–1939, Teacher of Dramatic Arts & Director College Theatre, Bennett College for Women, Greensboro, NC
- 1941–1946, Acting Teacher, Director, Studio Theatre training program, American Negro Theatre, NYC
- 1953–1955, Teacher of Acting, American Theatre Wing, NYC

== Awards and honors ==
- The Citation of American Wing War Services for outstanding service at the New York Stage Door Canteen.
- The United Seaman's Service Citation in recognition of devoted service during World War II.
- "The Osceola" an award created in her honor by the Delta Sigma Theta in recognition of distinguished achievement in the Arts.
- The Audelco Recognition Awards honored her as an "Outstanding Pioneer" on behalf of the Black community in the performing arts.

== Personal life ==
Born to a life insurance executive in Albany, Georgia, Adams was of European, Native American, and Black American heritage. She attended schools in Albany, Georgia including Albany Normal School, a predecessor to Albany State University, and then attended Fisk University's Preparatory School. She graduated from Howard University in 1913. More than 20 years later, at the urging of her husband, she went back to school for a master's degree in dramatic studies at New York University, graduating in 1936. Four years later, he died, and she returned to the theatre full time.
