= Harlem Repertory Theatre =

Theatre company

- HRT Promo
- Founder: Keith Lee Grant
- Resident Theatre: Tato Laviera Theatre
- Location: 240 E 123rd St, New York, NY
- Years Active: 2004 -

The Harlem Repertory Theatre (colloquially known as Harlem Rep) is a non profit professional theater company in Harlem. It was founded in 2004 by Keith Lee Grant, a theatre professor at City College with a goal of making theatre accessible to the Harlem community. They primarily seek to present shows that explore issues of class and race.

== History ==
In 2004, the Harlem Repertory Theatre was founded by Keith Lee Grant, a former Broadway performer and City College of New York (CCNY) professor, with funding support from CCNY. Its original home was Aaron Davis Hall on the CCNY campus in Harlem, where it performed for seven summer seasons. At this venue, the Harlem Repertory Theatre performed Hair, The Wiz, Vodu (a new musical theatre piece), Bye Bye Birdie, West Side Story, Cabaret, Dreamgirls, Tambourines to Glory, Dutchman, and As You Like It. In 2009, Harlem Rep collaborated with the Theater for the New City on Flahooley.

In 2010, Harlem Rep was forced to move off campus, which also cost the company its primary source for funding. It moved to the 133rd Street Arts Center, a 70-seat, second-floor theatre, with the assistance of Grant taking out a personal loan from his retirement fund to keep the company going. It was at this venue that Harlem Rep's production of Dreamgirls ran and received AUDELCO awards in a number of categories. After two seasons, the building was condemned, and Harlem Rep was forced to move again.

In 2013, the company moved to a larger space in the Tato Laviera Theatre in East Harlem, which became their permanent home. Among the productions at their East Harlem home are: A Raisin in the Sun (2017), Harburg & Saidy's Jamaica (2017), The Wizard of Oz (2019), and Sweet Charity (2019). Harlem Rep's production of Jamaica was the first New York production of the show since its original 1957 Broadway production.

== Awards ==
Year	Award	Production	Category	Nominee	Result
2008	AUDELCO	Ain't Misbehavin'	Best Performer in a Musical	Michael J	Nominated
2008	AUDELCO	Ain't Misbehavin'	Best Performer in a Musical	Danyel Fulton	Nominated
2008	AUDELCO	Ain't Misbehavin'	Best Performer in a Musical	Alexandra Bernard	Nominated
2008	AUDELCO	Ain't Misbehavin'	Best Choreographer of a Musical	Keith Lee Grant	Nominated
2008	AUDELCO	Ain't Misbehavin'	Best Director of a Musical	Keith Lee Grant	Nominated
2008	AUDELCO	Ain't Misbehavin'	Best Musical Production	-	Nominated
2009	AUDELCO	The Wiz	Best Performer in a Musical	Michael J	Nominated
2009	AUDELCO	The Wiz	Best Performer in a Musical	Danyel Fulton	Nominated
2009	AUDELCO	The Wiz	Best Performer in a Musical	Alexandra Bernard	Nominated
2009	AUDELCO	The Wiz	Best Choreographer of a Musical	Keith Lee Grant	Won
2009	AUDELCO	The Wiz	Best Director of a Musical	Keith Lee Grant	Won
2009	AUDELCO	The Wiz	Best Musical Production	-	Nominated
2012	AUDELCO	Dreamgirls	Outstanding Performance in a Musical – Male	Oscar Aguirre	Nominated
2012	AUDELCO	Dreamgirls	Best Musical Director	Andrew Araango	Nominated
2013	AUDELCO	Dreamgirls	Outstanding Performance in a Musical – Female	Dion Millington	Won
2013	AUDELCO	Dreamgirls	Best Director of a Musical	Keith Lee Grant	Won
2013	AUDELCO	Dreamgirls	Musical Production of the Year	-	Won
2016	AUDELCO	In The Heights	Best Revival	-	Nominated
2017	AUDELCO	A Raisin in the Sun	Best Revival	-	Nominated
