= Dennie Moore =

American actress (1902–1978)

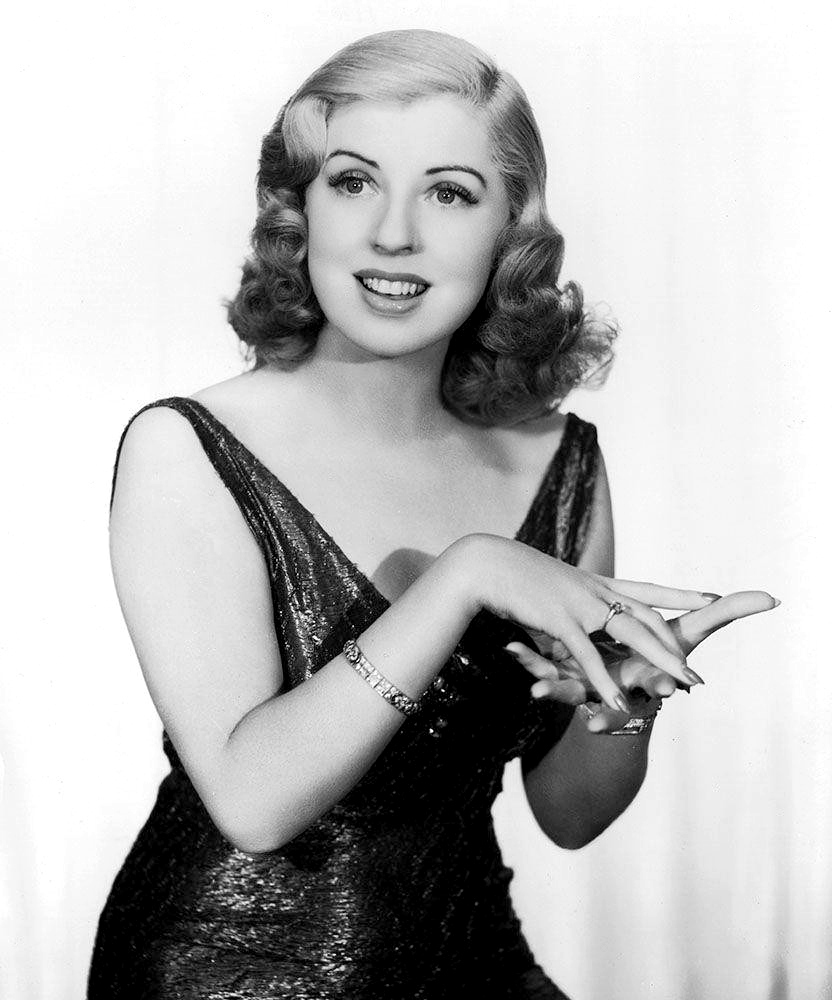
- Moore in the 1930s
- Born: Florence Moore; December 30, 1902; New York City, U.S.
- Died: February 22, 1978 (aged 75); New York City, U.S.
- Occupation: Actress
- Years active: 1927–1957

Dennie Moore (born Florence Moore; December 30, 1902 – February 22, 1978) was an American film and stage actress.

== Early life ==
Moore was born in New York City on December 30, 1902, to immigrant parents of Scottish and Irish descent. She was raised in Hell's Kitchen in Manhattan. Her brother, Joe Moore, was an Olympic champion speed skater, and she had two step-sisters and one step-brother. She received six years of schooling.

== Career ==
In the late 1920s, she decided to pursue an acting career, using the name Dennie Moore to avoid confusion with the actress Florence Moore. Starting in 1927, she appeared on Broadway in such plays as A Lady in Love, The Trial of Mary Dugan, Cross Roads, Torch Song, Twentieth Century, Phantoms, Conflict, Anatol, and Jarnegan. She also appeared in productions in Chicago, Illinois and London, England.

In 1935, Moore arrived in Hollywood and made her screen debut in an uncredited but substantial role in the Cary Grant-Katharine Hepburn film, Sylvia Scarlett for RKO Radio Pictures. She was primarily a freelance actress and floated between Metro-Goldwyn-Mayer and Warner Bros. Studios. In the course of her film career, she appeared in twenty-two films between 1935 and 1951, including Boy Meets Girl (1938), The Women (1939), Saturday's Children (1940), Dive Bomber (1941), and Anna Lucasta (1949).

By the mid-1940s, Moore found herself getting less work in Hollywood, but more parts on the New York stage. In 1951, she made her last screen appearance as Mrs. Bea Gingras in The Model and the Marriage Broker. Moving back to New York City, she made one final performance onstage, creating the role of Mrs. Van Daan in The Diary of Anne Frank. In 1957, she retired from acting at the age of 55.

== Later life and death ==
In 1977, David Ragan wrote in Who's Who in Hollywood that Moore "is retired, lives alone at an excellent hotel on Park Avenue, and is in her late 60s".

Moore died of natural causes at age 75 on February 22, 1978, in her Manhattan apartment. She left no immediate survivors. She was cremated and her ashes scattered off her balcony.

== Stage appearances ==
- A Lady in Love (1927)
- The Trial of Mary Dugan (1927)
- Jarnegan (1928–1929)
- Conflict (1929)
- Cross Roads (1929)
- Phantoms (1930)
- Torch Song (1930)
- Anatol (1931)
- East Wind (1931)
- The Man Who Reclaimed His Head (1932)
- The Great Magoo (1932)
- Twentieth Century (1932–1933)
- Man Bites Dog (1933)
- The Pursuit of Happiness (1933–1934)
- Say When (1934–1935)
- Swing Your Lady (1936–1937)
- Hitch Your Wagon (1937)
- In Clover (1937)
- Ah, Wilderness! (1941)
- Johnny on a Spot (1942)
- Over 21 (1944)
- Seven Lively Arts (1944–1945)
- Star-Spangled Family (1945)
- The Rat Race (1949–1950)
- The Diary of Anne Frank (1955–1957)

== Filmography ==
Year	Title	Role	Notes
1935	Sylvia Scarlett	Maudie Tilt – the Maid	Uncredited
1936	Meet Nero Wolfe	Mazie Gray	
1937	Angel	Emma MacGillicuddy Wilton	
1937	The Perfect Specimen	Clarabelle	
1937	Submarine D-1	Arabella	
1938	Mystery House	Annette	
1938	Cowboy from Brooklyn	Abby Pitts	
1938	Boy Meets Girl	Miss Crews	
1938	Secrets of an Actress	Miss Blackstone	
1939	The Adventures of Jane Arden	Teenie Moore	
1939	I'm from Missouri	Kitty Hearne	
1939	Bachelor Mother	Mary	
1939	These Glamour Girls	Mavis – Jane's Roommate	Uncredited
1939	The Women	Olga	
1939	No Place to Go	Mrs. Harriet Shafter	
1939	Eternally Yours	Waitress	Uncredited
1940	Saturday's Children	Gertrude Mills	
1940	Women in War	Ginger	
1941	Dive Bomber	Mrs. James	
1949	Anna Lucasta	Blanche	
1951	The Model and the Marriage Broker	Mrs. Bea Gingras	(final film role)
