= Hilda Simms =

American actress (1918–1994)

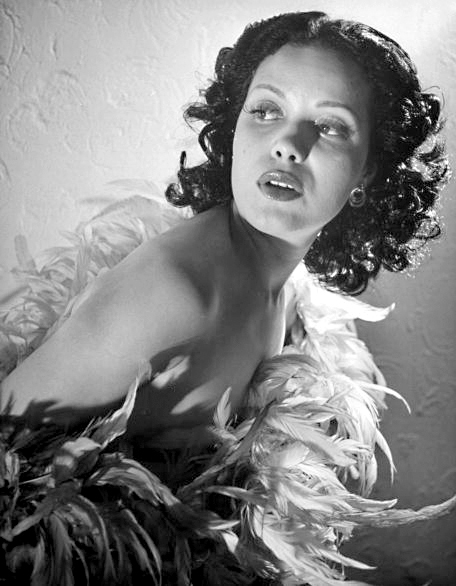
- Simms in 1944
- Born: Hilda Moses; April 15, 1918; Minneapolis, Minnesota, U.S.
- Died: February 6, 1994 (aged 75); Buffalo, New York, U.S.
- Other name: Julie Riccardo
- Years active: 1943–1963
- Notable work: Anna Lucasta
- Spouses: William Simms (m. 1941; div. 1941) Richard Angarola (m. 1948)

Hilda Simms (née Moses; April 15, 1918 – February 6, 1994) was an American stage actress, best known for her starring role on Broadway in Anna Lucasta.

== Early years ==
Hilda Simms was born Hilda Moses in Minneapolis, Minnesota, one of 9 siblings. She was the daughter of Emile and Lydia Moses, Roman Catholics of Creole descent. She graduated from South High School in Minneapolis.

When Simms starred in the critically acclaimed Broadway hit Anna Lucasta, her mother Lydia refused to attend the play on Broadway, stating that she would not watch her daughter play a prostitute as she didn't raise her that way. Simms and her siblings were raised devout Catholics in Minneapolis and walked several miles to school each morning to attend the Basilica of St. Mary on the outskirts of Minneapolis.

Before becoming an actress, Simms planned to be a teacher. She studied dramatics at the University of Minnesota before lack of funds forced her to leave.

== Career ==
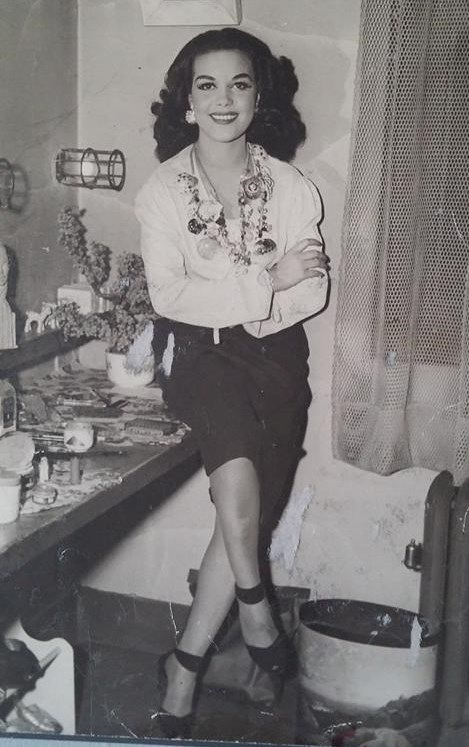
Hilda Simms backstage on Broadway

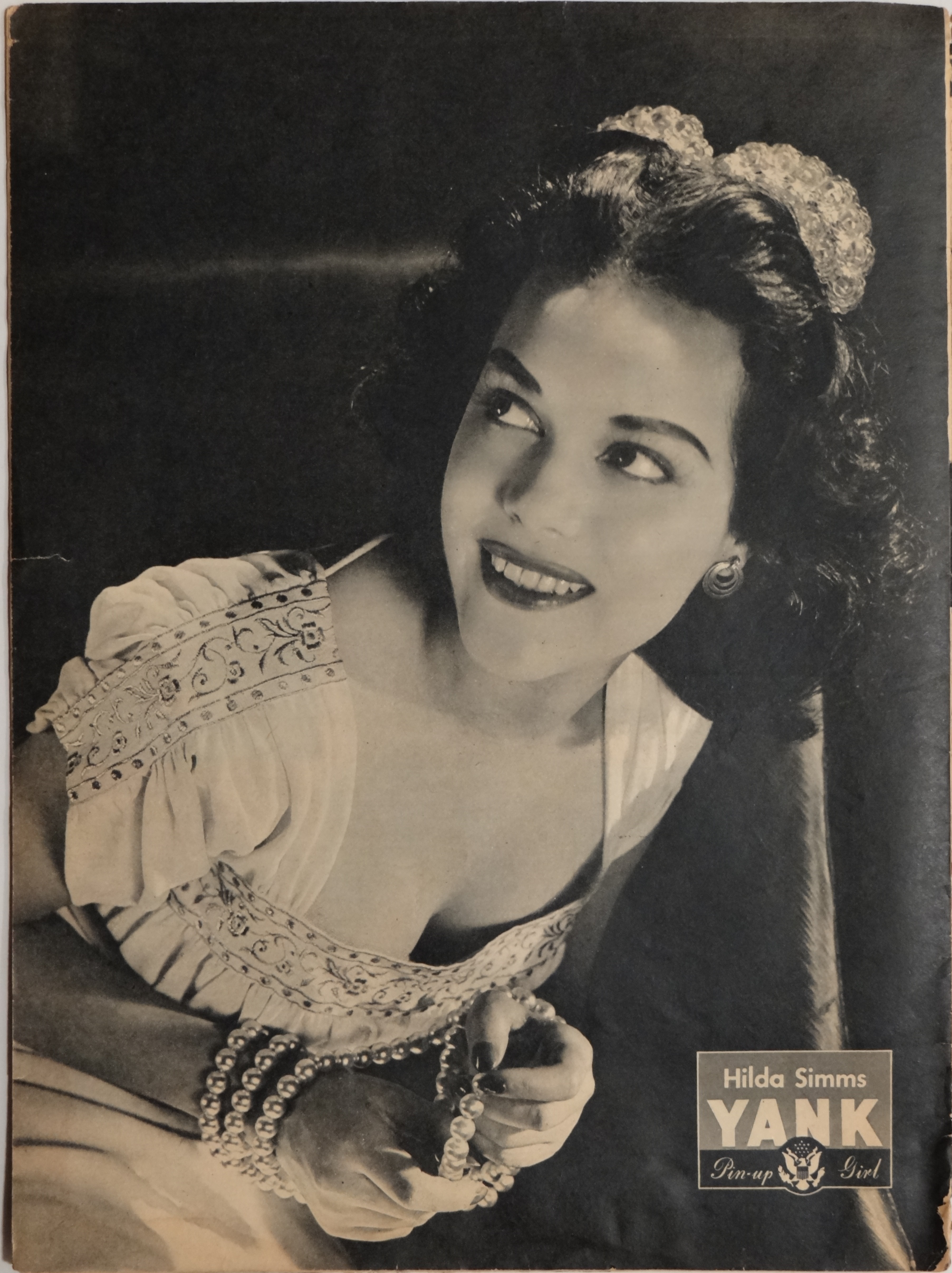
Hilda Simms in Yank, the Army Weekly (February 1945)

Simms relocated to New York, acting in radio dramas and becoming a member of the American Negro Theater, where she gained professional acting experience. There she worked on sound effects, props and publicity while learning her new craft. In New York she met and married William Simms and adopted his surname. That marriage ended in divorce, although she kept Simms as her professional name.

In 1943, Simms debuted in the title role of Philip Yordan's play, Anna Lucasta. Yordan had originally written the play for an all-white cast, but the show made a huge splash when the American Negro Theater produced it. The production moved to Broadway in 1944 where it became an early drama featuring African American actors in work that explored themes unrelated to race. When the play toured abroad, Simms continued playing in Anna Lucasta while enjoying a singing career in Paris nightclubs under the name Julie Riccardo.

During the British tour of the play in 1947, Simms met and married veteran American actor Richard Angarola. The couple returned to the States in the 1950s and Simms embarked on a promising film career that was cut short.

In 1950, Simms received critical acclaim in London when she performed in a revival of The Gentle People at the Embassy Theatre.

Her first role was as co-star to heavy-weight boxing champion Joe Louis. She played the boxer's wife in The Joe Louis Story (1953). In 1954, she featured as the sympathetic coatcheck girl Anne in Black Widow, a CinemaScope thriller by Nunnally Johnson. However, just as her career seemed to gearing up, she became a victim of the Hollywood blacklist.

The United States Department of Justice denied her passport in 1955 and canceled her scheduled 14-week USO tour of the Armed Forces in Europe, even though she had entertained troops and made War Bond tours during World War II. The Defense Department decision was based on speculation about her affiliation with the Communist Party in the late 1930s and early 1940s. That decision caused her dozens of lost opportunities and any chance of a film career evaporated. In 1960, she wrote an article titled "I'm No Benedict Arnold", which told her side of the story.

In 1958, she portrayed Blanche Du Bois in an off-Broadway production of A Streetcar Named Desire. She had the same role with an otherwise all-white cast the following year in a summer stock production of Streetcar at the Peninsula Playhouse in Fish Creek, Wisconsin.

Simms created a one-woman show targeted at college and university audiences in the fall of 1959. Her plans featured her "readings of love letters of famous courtesans and the world's greatest poetry." She hoped that the performances would lead to development of a repertory company composed of approximately a dozen Black professional actors.

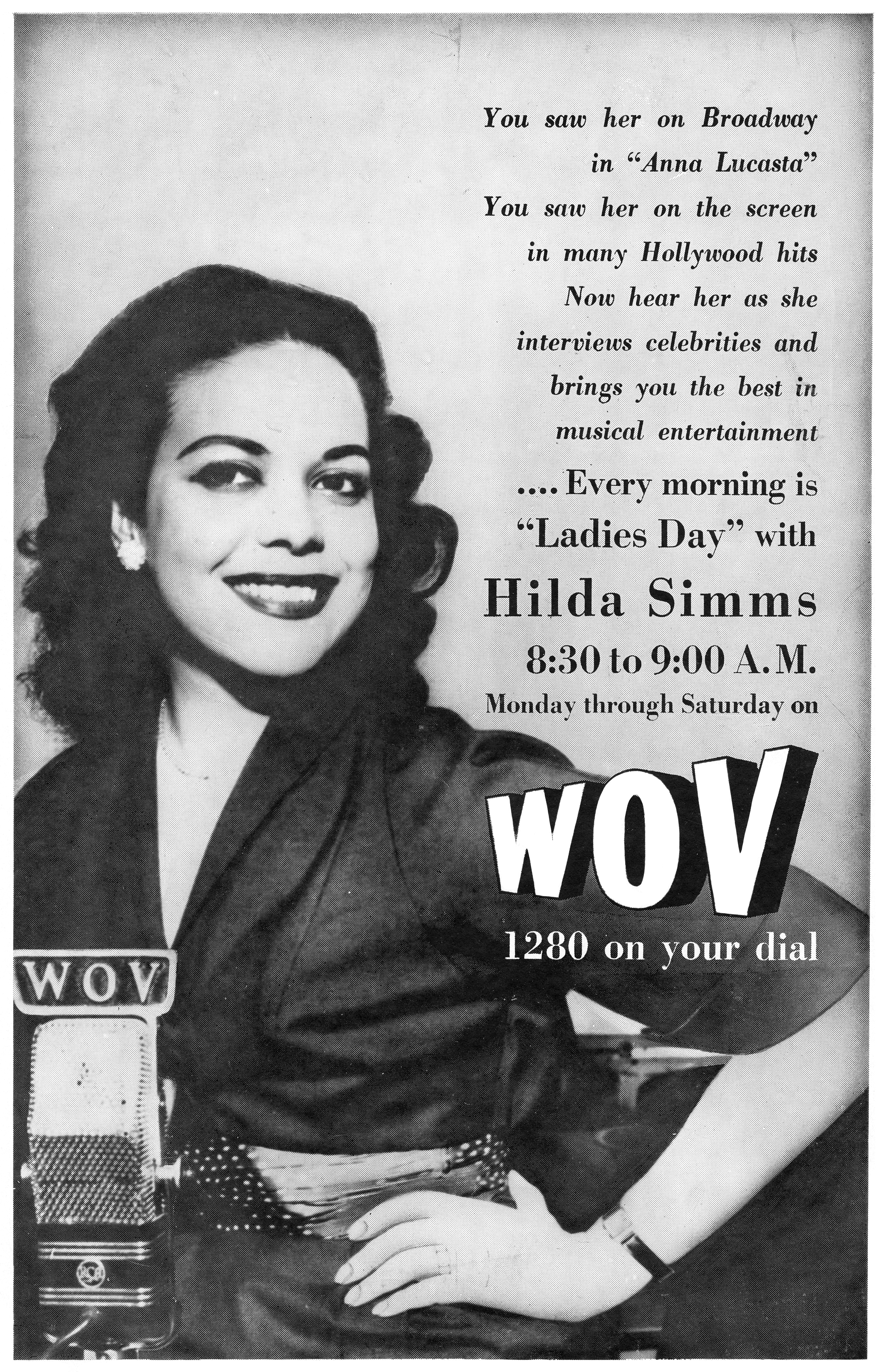
Advertisement for Simms' morning radio show, Ladies Day, in New York City

Simms continued her stage career in such productions as The Madwoman of Chaillot. Her other Broadway performances were in The Cool World (1960) and Tambourines to Glory (1963). She portrayed Miss Ayres on the television series The Nurses, and hosted her own radio show, titled Ladies Day, on New York City's WOV. She narrated, along with Frederick O'Neal, the educational record "Great Negro Americans", written and produced by Alan Sands. She also became an active participant in political movements and served as the creative arts director for the New York State Human Rights Commission. She eventually fulfilled her original dream of becoming a teacher and earned a master's degree in education from the City College of New York.

== Death ==
Hilda Simms died in Buffalo, New York, aged 75, from pancreatic cancer.

== See also ==
- Pin-ups of Yank, the Army Weekly
