= Carl Hall (singer) =

American actor and singer

Carl Hall (June 24, 1934 - September 28, 1999) was an American singer, actor, and musical arranger.

== Background ==
Carl Henry Carldwell was born on June 24, 1934, in Pittsburgh, Pennsylvania, the son of Carl and Jessie M. (Johnson) Carldwell. He was raised in the West End of Pittsburgh, Pennsylvania. Because of a reticence to talk about his age, his birthdate was not known to the public until after his death.

By November 1950 when his Social Security number was issued, he was also known as Carl Hall.

== Career ==
Hall got his start in music singing in church, as well as performing with choral groups at Herron Hill Junior High and Schenley High School. After graduating he was recruited as a member of Raymond Rasberry's acclaimed Ohio-based, gospel group, "The Rasberry Singers", recording on the American Savoy Records label. He had become the ensemble's lead singer by the time they released a single for Vee-Jay Records. Hall left the group to serve in the U.S. Army but by 1962, having demobbed, he was singing in nightclubs.

Hall also recorded a series of soul music singles in the 1960s and 1970s, starting with an unsuccessful period in 1964 with Mercury Records where one of his producers was Quincy Jones. A cover of the Frankie Laine track "I Believe" was released under the name C. Henry Hall. He was to be renamed Carl Henry Hall on his second Mercury single, "Summertime" and by 1965 he was billed as Carl Hall on "My Baby's So Good," co-produced by Jones. None of these made an impression on the charts, so by 1967 he and the label parted ways.

He then joined forces with leading New York R&B producer, Jerry Ragovoy - impressed with Hall's four-octave range to the extent that he helped him secure a contract with the Warner Brothers/Reprise subsidiary label, Loma Records. Together they cut the now much sought-after tracks, "You Don't Know Nothing About Love" / "Mean It Baby" (November 1967) and "I Don't Want to Be Your Used to Be" / "The Dam Busted" (Spring 1968), using a strong gospel-inspired style. Lack of promotion from Loma ensured neither did well, with the company subsequently going out of business months after the latter failed to hit. Ragovoy also produced another single on Atlantic in 1972 and then the following year, a now in-demand track called "What About You" on Columbia. He co-wrote and co-produced his final single for small NYC label, Martru in 1987.

Later in his career, as a session vocalist, Carl Hall can be found on the Lou Courtney classic “What Do You Want Me To Do” and various tracks by Stephanie Mills.

He performed in theatre over three decades, beginning with Tambourines to Glory, a gospel-based musical, in 1963. Hall also appeared on Broadway in the stage production of the musical The Wiz, among other shows.

== Death ==
He died in New York City on September 28, 1999.
