= Tambourines to Glory =

1963 gospel play

Tambourines to Glory is a gospel play with music by Langston Hughes and Jobe Huntley which tells the story of two female street preachers who open a storefront church in Harlem. The play premiered on Broadway in 1963.

== Background ==
Hughes began writing Tambourines to Glory: A Play with Songs in July 1956, and later that year turned it into a novel, which was published by John Day in 1958.

== Production ==
The play opened on Broadway at the Little Theatre November 2, 1963 and closed on November 23, 1963. The playbill for the 1963 premiere makes reference to the "gospel singing play" being adapted from Hughes' novel.

The opening night cast featured a who's who of African-American performers, including:

- Joseph Attles
- Louis Gossett Jr.
- Micki Grant
- Robert Guillaume
- Carl Hall
- Rosalie King
- Rosetta LeNoire
- Theresa Merritt Hines
- Clara Ward
- Judd Jones
- Hilda Simms
- Thelma Carpenter (standby)

== Reception ==
The musical was generally well-received but generated some criticism from certain segments of the black intelligentsia, who felt that the themes of corruption and hypocrisy mocked the black church. Howard Taubman, in his review in The New York Times wrote: "The leading players are supported by an ensemble overflowing with energy and a zest for song. Like their play, they'd all be more usefully employed if they had more gospel songs to sing and less story to tell."
