= Abram Hill =

American dramatist

Abram Hill, also known as Ab Hill, (January 20, 1910 – October 13, 1986) was an American playwright, author of On Strivers Row, Walk Hard, Talk Loud and several other plays; and a principal figure in the development of black theatre from Atlanta, Georgia.

Although best known for his literary work On Strivers Row, Hill's most fundamental accomplishment was his part in founding American Negro Theater (ANT) alongside Frederick O'Neal, and members of the McClendon Players.

== Biography ==
=== Early years and education ===
Abram Hill was born in Atlanta, Georgia, on January 20, 1910, and spent half of his childhood there. At the age of seven he appeared in a Morehouse College Theatre production. In 1925, the family moved to Harlem, New York, and at 13 years of age Hill attended De Witt Clinton High School. After completing high school, he enrolled at City College of New York for two years and subsequently graduated with a B.A. from Lincoln University, Pennsylvania, in 1937; before graduating he secured a job in drama with the CCC (Civilian Conservation Corps), where he directed productions with male youths. He majored in Theater Arts at Lincoln, and after graduating was hired as an assistant in the university's drama department.

Hill returned to New York a year later and joined the Federal Theater Project as a script reader. While working in this group, he wrote his plays Stealing Lightning and Hell's Half Acre. These plays would later be produced by the Unity Players of the Bronx, which eventually helped him earn the Theresa Helbrun Scholarship at the New School for Social Research, studying under John Gassner and Erwin Piscator. His work mostly comprised reading plays for production. He wrote some of his own plays during this period, including On Strivers' Row, Walk Hard, and Liberty Deferred.

=== American Negro Theater ===
In 1939 the Federal Theater Project was shut down, and Hill then teamed up with Frederick O'Neal and a group of other drama artists to form American Negro Theater (ANT) in Harlem. Hill and O'Neal believed that mainstream theater not only had few opportunities for Black actors, but that it also encouraged a hostile competitive relationship between the artists — each striving to be the only "star". By contrast, ANT was interested in showing the Black community their own power, with directors, writers, technicians, and actors being equally important. Their stated mission was: "to break down the barriers of Black participation in the Theater; to portray Negro life as they honestly saw it; [and] to fill the gap of a Black Theater which did not exist." They hoped to establish a company as a platform for African-American artists that would provide opportunities not available to them on Broadway, creating an accessible space where they could perform regularly. In June 1940, ANT got off to a promising start, and became one of the most prominent and successful black theaters. From 1940 to 1950, ANT put on 20 plays, more than half of which were original. During the company's years of operation, 50,000 people attended ANT plays.

Interviewed shortly before his death, Hill recalled how he brought Harlem residents into the theater. "We sent a wagon up and down the streets of Harlem with somebody beating a drum.... We passed out handbills on the street corners. And we had a family night. We let in five members of the family for a dollar."

After leaving ANT in 1948, he continued working both as a director, with the Lincoln University Players in the early 1950s, and as a teacher of English in New York schools. Abram Hill died in Harlem at the age of 76 in 1986.

== Legacy ==
An exhibition entitled The 75th Anniversary of the American Negro Theatre was opened at the Schomburg Center for Research in Black Culture in 2015.
