= John Wildberg =

American lawyer and theater producer

John J. Wildberg (September 4, 1902 – February 8, 1959) was an American copyright attorney who later became a theatre producer.

He was born Jacques Wildberg in New York, NY, the eldest son of Jacob and Joan Wildberg. His fourth marriage, to novelist Ursula Parrott in 1934 (her third), ended in June 1938 on the grounds of his intolerable cruelty.

Wildberg's most successful show, Anna Lucasta, was produced in 1944. Together with Cheryl Crawford, he co-produced the first revivals of Porgy and Bess (1942) and One Touch of Venus (1943).

In 1950 his fifth wife took an overdose of sedatives and died in bed next to him.

Wildberg had various business ventures in London, England, and moved there in 1951. He died there on February 8, 1959, and was cremated in Golders Green Crematorium.

== Selected productions ==
- A Woman's a Fool - to Be Clever, October 18, 1938 - October 1938
- Porgy and Bess, January 22, 1942 - September 26, 1942 (co-producer)
- Porgy and Bess, September 13, 1943 - October 2, 1943 (associate producer)
- One Touch of Venus, October 7, 1943 - February 10, 1945 (co-producer)
- Porgy and Bess, February 7, 1944 - April 8, 1944
- Anna Lucasta (all-black cast), August 30, 1944 - November 30, 1946
- Memphis Bound, May 24, 1945 - June 23, 1945
- Anna Lucasta, September 22, 1947 - October 18, 1947
- Black Chiffon, September 27, 1950 - January 13, 1951
