= Joseph Attles =

American actor (1903–1990)

- Born: April 7, 1903; James Island, South Carolina
- Died: October 29, 1990 (aged 87); Charleston, South Carolina
- Occupations: Stage, film actor

Joseph Attles (April 7, 1903 – October 29, 1990) was an American character actor of the legitimate theater, vaudeville and motion pictures.

Attles was born on April 7, 1903, in James Island, South Carolina. Prior to becoming a full-time performer, he was a postal clerk and a singer in the choir at Abyssinian Baptist Church in New York.

Attles's Broadway credits included Blackbirds of 1928 (1928), Kwamina (1961), Tambourines to Glory (1963), and A Cry of Players (1968). When he was not in a current play, he held other jobs, including being a waiter in a dining car on the Pennsylvania Railroad.

Attles died of prostate cancer on October 29, 1990, in Charleston, South Carolina.

== Theatre ==
- Tambourines to Glory
- John Henry - 1940
- Porgy and Bess -1953
- Jericho-Jim Crow
- King Lear - 1969
- The Last of Mrs. Lincoln - 1973
- Bubbling Brown Sugar - 1977

== Filmography ==
Year	Title	Role	Notes
1968	For Love of Ivy	Doorman	
1970	The Liberation of L.B. Jones	Henry	
1971	The Pursuit of Happiness	Holmes	
1971	Going Home	Bible Man	
1972	Across 110th Street	Mr. Jessup	
1974	The Taking of Pelham One Two Three	Angry Man	
1974	The Gambler	Singer in Park	(final film role)
