= Anna Lucasta (1949 film) =

1949 film by Irving Rapper

- Directed by: Irving Rapper
- Screenplay by: Philip Yordan; Arthur Laurents
- Based on: the play Anna Lucasta by Philip Yordan
- Produced by: Philip Yordan
- Starring: Paulette Goddard; William Bishop; John Ireland; Oskar Homolka; Broderick Crawford
- Cinematography: Sol Polito
- Edited by: Charles Nelson
- Music by: David Diamond
- Color process: Black and white
- Production company: Security Pictures
- Distributed by: Columbia Pictures
- Release date: July 11, 1949
- Running time: 86 minutes
- Country: United States
- Language: English
- Box office: $1.7 million (rentals US/Canada)

Anna Lucasta is a 1949 American film noir drama film directed by Irving Rapper and starring Paulette Goddard, William Bishop, John Ireland, Oscar Homolka, and Broderick Crawford.

== Plot ==
When the Lucasta family in Pennsylvania receives a message that a friend's son Rudolf is coming to town to find a wife, they see a chance to make some money. The friend of the family, Mr. Strobel, will send $4,000 to accompany Rudolf. The family decides on trying to "sell" one of their own daughters, Anna, to Rudolf. The only one opposed to the idea is her alcoholic father, Joe. His daughter Stella's husband Frank (Anna's brother-in-law) persuades Joe to agree by beating him.

Anna is considered a black sheep of the family, living in Brooklyn and working in a bar called Noah's Ark for a living. She is attracted to a sailor named Danny Johnson, and when he tells her he has saved up enough money to go ashore, she believes he will ask her to marry him. But he doesn't. When Anna is asked by the family to return home, she reluctantly does so, having no other plausible alternative. Rudolf isn't as gullible as the family had thought. He is an educated man who plans to work hard on the family land to make it prosper while working as a teacher in a school. He takes an instant liking to Anna, but her father tries to persuade him he could do better. Angry with her father, she goes to a local bar for a drink.

Rudolf joins Anna in the bar and they end up having dinner together. Rudolf proposes to her the next day, but she doesn't give him an answer. On the farm she is reminded of when she used to live there when she was younger, and scolded by her father for kissing a boy, which caused her to leave her home. Haunted by these bad memories, she goes to the train station to leave town. Rudolf follows her once again, and persuades her to stay and marry him. He gives her the $4,000 he has with him, but the money is stolen by her family before their wedding.

When Rudolf and Anna are about to get married, sailor Danny arrives and asks for her. Joe talks to him and then goes to Anna and threatens to ruin Rudolf's reputation by disclosing details about Anna's previous life. Joe demands that Anna leave town with Danny immediately. Anna sees no other alternative than to leave with Danny and goes back to Brooklyn. But Rudolf doesn't give up. He tracks her down to Brooklyn and eventually discovers the bar where she works. He waits but she doesn't turn up, so instead he leaves a message that her father Joe has died and leaves.

When Anna arrives to the bar she gets the message and tries to contact him. She finds that he has left his hotel already, and loses all hope of reconciliation. When she leaves the bar after work, Rudolf is outside waiting for her.

== Cast ==
- Paulette Goddard as Anna Lucasta
- William Bishop as Rudolf Strobel
- John Ireland as Danny Johnson
- Oscar Homolka as Joe Lucasta
- Broderick Crawford as Frank
- Will Geer as Noah
- Gale Page as Katie
- Mary Wickes as Stella
- Whit Bissell as Stanley
- Lisa Golm as Theresa
- James Brown as Buster
- Dennie Moore as Blanche
- Anthony Caruso as Eddie

== Production ==
Irving Rapper wanted Susan Hayward in the lead but says Paulette Goddard "produced a letter promising her the part and it was too late for anyone to get out from under; we'd all signed to do it."

== Reception ==
The film earned theatrical rentals of $1.7 million in the US and Canada.

== See also ==
- List of American films of 1949
- Hilda Simms, who starred in the Broadway version
- Anna Lucasta (1958 film version with Eartha Kitt and Sammy Davis Jr.)
