= Anna Lucasta (1958 film) =

1958 film by Arnold Laven

- Directed by: Arnold Laven
- Written by: Philip Yordan
- Produced by: Sidney Harmon
- Starring: Eartha Kitt; Sammy Davis Jr. Henry Scott
- Cinematography: Lucien Ballard
- Edited by: Richard C. Meyer; Robert Lawrence
- Music by: Elmer Bernstein (Lee Osborne music editor)
- Production company: Longridge Enterprises
- Distributed by: United Artists
- Release dates: November 26, 1958 (Chicago); January 16, 1959 (New York City); February 1959 (U.S.)
- Running time: 97 minutes
- Country: United States
- Language: English
- Budget: $400,000

Anna Lucasta is a 1958 American drama film directed by Arnold Laven and written by Philip Yordan. It stars Eartha Kitt, Sammy Davis Jr., and Henry Scott. It is a remake of the 1949 film noir version (directed by Irving Rapper and starring Paulette Goddard), which itself was an adaptation of the 1936 stage play.

== Plot ==
At the family home in Los Angeles, patriarch Joe Lucasta learns that his friend Otis has sold a farm in Alabama, distributing the proceeds to his children. Otis' son Rudolph is bringing his share to California, where Otis hopes that Joe can find a wife for Rudolph. Joe's son Stanley and son-in-law Frank hope to get the money by being the ones to find Rudolph a wife. Though uninterested in the money, Joe's wife Theresa suggests youngest daughter Anna, whom Joe put out of the house sometime earlier. Theresa believes Anna is good and sees a chance for her to get a fresh start. Stanley, Frank, and Frank's wife Stella who's also Anna's and Stanley's sister regard Anna as a "slut", but will try to make her seem respectable to deceive Rudolph. Joe objects to their designs on Rudolph's money and to Anna returning, as he also holds her in low regard. Eventually, Frank browbeats Joe into going to Anna's last known whereabouts, a dockside cafe in San Diego, to bring her home.

The cafe is Anna's regular haunt, as she leads a day-to-day existence seducing sailors for meals, drinks and board. As the cafe is closing, she has no place to spend the night. Just then, Danny Johnson arrives looking to renew his acquaintance with Anna. His naval enlistment ending, he asks her to move in with him, though he's uninterested in marriage. As Anna parties with Danny, Joe arrives and asks her to come home. Anna consents, but after her arrival, Joe angrily rebuffs her efforts to rebuild their relationship.

Soon thereafter, Rudolph arrives in town. Having expected Rudolph to be a rube, Frank is disappointed to discover that he's a college graduate, unlikely to be fooled by Anna's guise of respectability. Furthermore, Rudolph's only interest is getting a job, the search for a wife having been more his father's concern than his own. When Rudolph meets Anna, however, he's smitten and they begin a romance. Anna tells him of her ejection from the household - Joe had become angrier than she'd ever seen a person when boys took interest in her (but later it appears he was unnaturally jealous), so he falsely accused her of promiscuity and threw her out. After she confesses the truth of her life in San Diego Rudolph says that he still loves her, and Anna agrees to marry him.

As Anna is alone in the family home after the wedding, Danny arrives, responding to her letter asking him to come. She informs him that after sending the letter, she fell in love and got married. Danny protests, but Anna is insistent and he surrenders. As Danny is leaving, Joe comes home, declaring his intention to break up Anna's relationship with Rudolph. Anna begs Joe to allow her to begin a new life and be happy. Danny sticks up for Anna, offering to beat up Joe to prevent him from disrupting her marriage. But Joe says that he's ruined Rudolph's job opportunity by informing the employer about Anna's past. He says that he'll do the same any place Rudolph seeks work. As Anna breaks down into tears and Joe flies into a rage, Danny pulls Anna away and takes her out of the house.

Danny and Anna head back to San Diego and spend days partying before deciding to move to Brazil. Danny needs time to raise money for ship's passage, but Anna wants to leave immediately and remembers she has money at the Lucasta home. When she and Danny return to retrieve it while the family is at church, they find Joe on his deathbed. While Danny goes to call a doctor, Anna stays with Joe as he deliriously addresses her as though she were a little girl, calling her his "angel" as he had before their relationship soured. Joe implores Jesus to watch over Anna, who is so overwhelmed that she's unable to respond to him before he dies.

Danny observes Anna weep inconsolably over Joe and looks at a joyful picture of the two of them during Anna's childhood. He then quietly exits the house. As he's about to drive away, he smiles upon seeing the family, including Rudolph, returning from church. As Danny drives off, Rudolph notices him and realizes that Anna is in the house. He excitedly rushes past the others and runs inside.

== Cast ==
- Eartha Kitt as Anna Lucasta
- Sammy Davis Jr. as Danny Johnson
- Frederick O'Neal as Frank
- Henry Scott as Rudolph Slocum
- Rex Ingram as Joe Lucasta
- Alvin Childress as Noah
- James Edwards as Eddie
- Rosetta LeNoire as Stella
- Isabel Cooley as Katie Lucasta
- Georgia Burke as Theresa Lucasta
- Claire Leyba as Blanch
- John Proctor as Stanley Lucasta
- Charles Swain as Lester
- Isaac Jones as Police officer
- Wallace Earl Laven as Secretary

== Production ==
The film was shot at Samuel Goldwyn Studio from early May through early June 1958.

It was Davis's first dramatic feature film role. He played Danny, a minor role in the original stage play, but the part was expanded to capitalize on his fame. Kitt claimed that Henry Scott was the actor who played opposite her and that Davis was there to sing the soundtrack.

Kitt's deal gave her a percentage of the film earnings.

== Reception ==
According to Robert Osborne, the film was unsuccessful at the box office after United Artists gave it little promotion and only a limited release.

== Film credits ==
Additional film credits:

- Music: Elmer Bernstein (composer); Sammy Cahn (composer); Lee Osborne (music editor)
- Art Director: John S. Poplin Jr.
- Graphic Artist: Charles White
- Visual Effects: Jack Rabin and Louis DeWitt (special photography effects); Irving Lerner (montage conceived by)
- Make up: Ted Coodley (makeup artist) and Helene Parrish (hairstylist)
- Costume-wardrobe: Virginia Dey (wardrobe stylist); Sophia Stutz (women’s wardrobe); Norman Martien (men’s wardrobe)
- Art Department: Lyle B. Reifsnyder (set dresser); Richard Rubin (prop master)
- Sound: Jack Solomon
- Film Production (main): Leon Chooluck (production supervisor); James Yarbrough (script supervisor)
