= Anna Lucasta (play) =

1944 play written by Philip Yordan

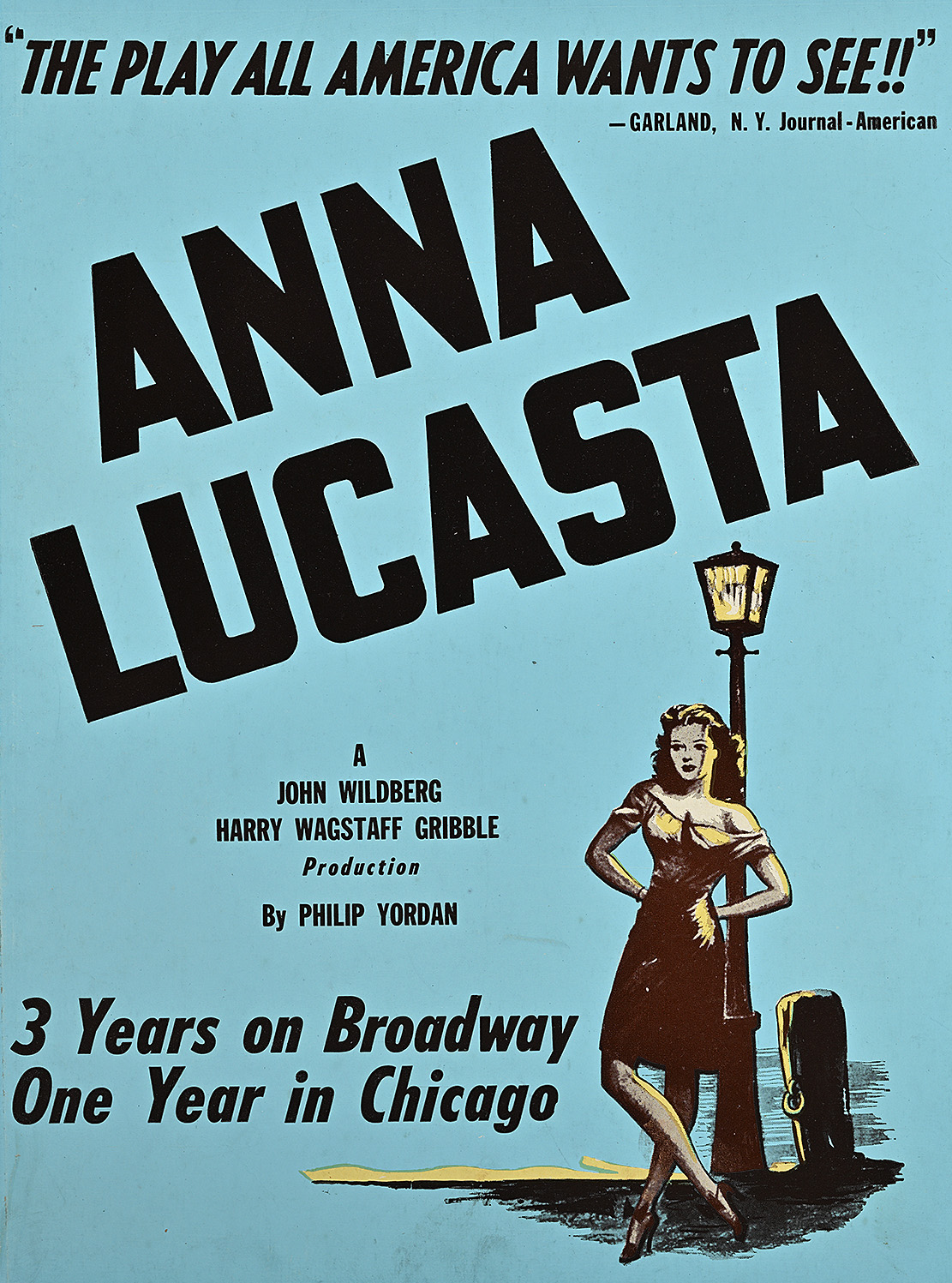
- Poster from a circa 1947 touring production of the play
- Original language: English
- Written by: Philip Yordan
- Characters: Anna; Joe; Rudolf; Danny; Noah; Theresa; Stella; Blanche; Frank; Eddie
- Setting: The Lucasta living room in Pennsylvania and Noah's Bar in Brooklyn, in early 1941.

Premiere
- Date: June 16, 1944
- Place: Library Theatre, 103 West 135th Street, Harlem, New York City

Anna Lucasta is a 1944 American play by Philip Yordan. Inspired by Eugene O'Neill's Anna Christie, the play was originally written about a Polish American family. The American Negro Theatre director Abram Hill and director Harry Wagstaff Gribble adapted the script for an all African American cast, and presented the first performance on June 16, 1944. The play moved from Harlem to Broadway's Mansfield Theatre, running August 30, 1944 – November 30, 1946. The Broadway cast included Hilda Simms, Canada Lee, and Alice Childress.

== History ==
The play Anna Lucasta was a breakthrough for writer Philip Yordan, who went on to a prolific career as a screenwriter. The story of a prostitute who struggles for respectability is similar to that of Eugene O'Neill's Anna Christie. Originally titled Anna Lukaska, Yordan's three-act drama was conceived as being about a Polish-American woman and her predatory family. When he was unable to find a Broadway producer for the play, Yordan offered it to the American Negro Theatre. Company founder Abram Hill obtained the rights and adapted it for an African-American cast.

First produced in Harlem, it went on to become the first Broadway play with an all-black cast in a drama unrelated to race. The play ran for more than two years—a rare achievement at that time—and it was adapted twice for film. Anna Lucasta cast member Alice Childress was inspired to write the Obie Award-winning drama, Trouble in Mind (1955), based on her experiences in the production.

According to Ben Maddow, Yordan based the script on "this B-girl that he knew from a Chicago bar whom he was tremendously in love with... The only person he ever expressed any tenderness for." He said Yordan optioned the play to Sidney Harmon who had produced Men in White and he found a black theatre group willing to do the play.

== Synopsis ==
A girl making her way through life as a prostitute seeks forgiveness from her family. The Lucastas, working-class people in a coal mining town, are selfish people whose daughter, Anna, has left home to lead what they consider a "life of shame" in the city. Rudolf, the son of a friend, comes to visit them on the suggestion of his father. He has several hundred dollars in his pocket and is eager to marry. The family decides that the youth is a hick, but there is a chance to marry off Anna "respectably". However, Rudolf turns out to be rather attractive and has graduated from an agriculture college. When Anna returns home, she is fascinated by him and the two fall in love, though she is still in love with her sailor boyfriend Danny. Anna gradually awakens to find out what it means to be treated by a kind young man. For Anna is not a degenerate, but a high spirited girl driven from home by her father's puritanical cruelty. Without telling Rudolf about her past, she agrees to marry him. But on her wedding day, Danny shows up. Anna, believing that a life with Rudolf is impossible, returns to her old haunts in the city. Rudolf realizes he loves Anna more deeply, and sets out to find her. He makes her realize his love for her and they go off together.

== Productions ==
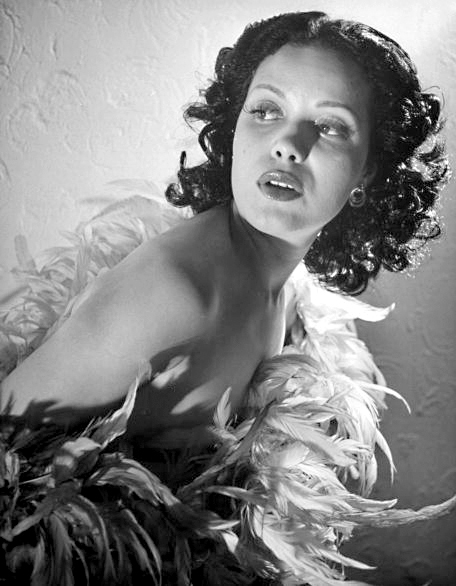
Hilda Simms as Anna Lucasta

The play was originally produced by American Negro Theatre Company. It was first presented at the Library Theatre in the basement of the 135th Street Branch of the New York Public Library now known as the Schomburg Center for Research in Black Culture. The cast worked during the day, rehearsed after work, and were kicked out by the janitor at 11 p.m.

Directed by Harry Wagstaff Gribble, Anna Lucasta premiered June 16, 1944, at the Library Theatre, 103 West 135th Street, with the following cast:

- Lionel Monagas as Noah
- Alvin Childress as Joe
- Earle Hyman as Rudolf
- Letitia Toole as Catherine
- Alberta Perkins as Theresa
- Frederick O'Neal as Frank
- Betty Haynes as Stella
- John Proctor as Stanley
- Hilda Moses Simms as Anna
- Alice Childress as Blanche
- Martin Slade as Eddie
- Billy Cumberbatch as Danny
- Buddy Holmes as Lester

Produced by John Wildberg, Anna Lucasta transferred from Harlem to Broadway, opening August 30, 1944, at the Mansfield Theatre with the following cast:

- Alvin Childress as Noah
- George Randol as Joe
- Earle Hyman as Rudolf
- Theodora Smith as Katie
- Georgia Burke as Theresa
- Frederick O'Neal as Frank
- Rosetta LeNoire as Stella
- John Proctor as Stanley
- Hilda Simms as Anna
- Alice Childress as Blanche
- Hubert Henry as Eddie
- Canada Lee as Danny
- John Tate as Lester

Notably among the later casts of Broadway performances was Ruby Dee, making her Broadway debut as Anna.

"With the arrival of Anna Lucasta on Broadway," wrote Life magazine, "the 1944–45 theater season had its first worthwhile drama." The magazine praised the top-flight cast, particularly Hilda Simms in her professional debut, but expressed disappointment at the "weak Broadway ending" that had been substituted for the "stinging honesty" of the version of the play seen in Harlem, which ended in Anna's suicide.

Though many biographies list Alice Childress as having received a Tony Award nomination for her starring performance, this information appears to be inaccurate as the Tony Awards did not begin until 1947, some years after the production. The production closed on November 30, 1946, after 957 performances, and then made an extensive tour of the US and Europe. A limited-run return engagement opened at the National Theatre on September 22, 1947.

Anna Lucasta was produced in London in 1947 at His Majesty's Theatre. The cast list is as follows:

- Edith Whiteman as Katie
- Betty Haynes as Stella
- Georgia Burke as Theresa
- John Proctor as Stanley
- Frederick O'Neal as Frank
- Emmett Babe Wallace as Eddie
- Reginald Fednerson as Noah
- Claire Leyba as Blanche
- Eddie Banks as Officer
- Hilda Simms as Anna
- John Tate as Danny
- Kenneth Freeman as Lester
- Earle Hyman as Rudolf

The production was an inspiration for independent black British theatre groups as remarked by the actor Pauline Henriques, one of the understudies in the London production. Another production in Paris starred Paulette Goddard and a white cast.

However, the ANT did not get to enjoy the success of Anna Lucasta. The two copies of the Hill-Yordan-Wildberg contracts filed with the Dramatists Guild could not be found. Hill had to renegotiate his entire contract. At first, Wildberg, the producer, refused to discuss it but Yordan said he would take care of it. Just before the Broadway opening, Hill threatened an injunction. Wildberg said he would pay 2 percent of the Broadway production. Hill took it before the ANT committee and explained it. Eight of the company of members were in the Broadway show and three of them are on the committee. They were also under contract with Wildberg, who offered no additional rights from a possible film and no radio rights. He offered only 2 percent of the Broadway show. The committee voted to accept it. The producer said Hill's percentage was included in the 2 percent for ANT. Hill claimed his "lost" contract called for 10 percent of the writing share. He battled for six months. Finally, the producer said, instead of money, they'd produce Hill's drama, Walk Hard, on Broadway. Hill decided that rather than risk losing everything if the play failed, he would take a fee of $25,000 for his writing efforts.

== Reception ==
The 1944 production was critically acclaimed particularly for presenting a story that does not condescend African-Americans and performances from an all African-American cast. The Daily News wrote, “Anna Lucasta is a first rate drama. Acted by a company of colored actors players who are a joy to watch… it had first nighters cheering.” The Baltimore wrote, “It is not only a first rate drama, top-notch theatre, with some of the finest acting, both dramatic and comedic, that has ever been seen on Broadway. But it is the first American play designed for an all colored cast to treat of colored life without a certain amused condescension… the first play of colored life to recognize the fact that colored person are individuals with the same problems, ways of living, speech, and point of views as the whites....” The New York Times and The New York Sun praised the performances of Hilda Simms, who plays Anna, and Canada Lee, who plays Danny. The New York Times writes, “Hilda Simms is a wonderful young lady who also understands what to do with the part...in a small role, Canada Lee, normally a star in his own right, but helping out his friends at this time and acting in a way that made him a star." The New York Sun wrote, "Canada Lee, an asset to any play, brings his vigorous playing to any scene..."

The one critical remark about the production was that the acting surpassed the script. Variety wrote, “Play was spotty but the performances are excellent." The Herald Tribune also wrote, “The acting warrants better material…” and The New York Sun also wrote, "Put 'Anna Lucasta' down as a credible presentation of a spotty and uncertain play." Even the director of the production, Harry Wagstaff Gribble, felt like it was not a perfect play but the forefront of what the future could hold for African-American actors in the theatre and it accomplished some of the ideas that he wanted to do with black theatre and how to represent African Americans as individuals.

== Adaptations ==
Two films were made based on the original Yordan play. A 1949 film directed by Irving Rapper and starring Paulette Goddard, was released by Columbia Pictures. A 1958 film directed by Arnold Laven and produced by Sidney Harmon was released by United Artists. The film starred Eartha Kitt in the title role and Sammy Davis Jr. as Danny Johnson.
