= The Day of the Triffids (disambiguation) =

The Day of the Triffids is a novel by John Wyndham.

The title may also refer to:

- The Day of the Triffids (film), the 1962 film version
- The Day of the Triffids (1981 TV series), the 1981 television version
- The Day of the Triffids (2009 TV series), the 2009 television version

== See also ==
- Triffid
- The Night of the Triffids
- Trifid (disambiguation)
