= List of fictional plants =

This list of fictional plants describes invented plants that appear in works of fiction.

== In fiction ==
=== In J. R. R. Tolkien's Middle-earth ===
- Aeglos: A plant similar to a gorse, named for the Elvish 'snow-thorn'
- Athelas: A healing plant with long leaves (also known as Kingsfoil or asëa aranion).
- Elanor: A small star-shaped yellow flower from Tol Eressëa and Lothlórien.
- Mallorn: A huge tree with green-and-silver leaves turning golden in autumn and remaining so till spring, upon which the Elves of Lothlórien housed.
- Nimloth: The White Tree of Númenor, a seedling of Celeborn, a seedling of Galathilion, created in the image of Telperion.
- Niphredil: A small white flower from Doriath and Lothlórien.
- Pipe-weed: "A strain of the herb nicotiana" (tobacco); varieties mentioned include Longbottom Leaf, Old Toby, Southern Star (grown in the Shire) and Southlinch, from Bree.
- Oiolairë: An evergreen fragrant tree highly esteemed by the Númenóreans.
- Simbelmynë: A white flower that grew in Gondolin and Rohan (also known as Evermind and Alfirin).
- Two Trees of Valinor: Magic trees that illuminated the Blessed Realm in ancient times.

=== In J. K. Rowling's Harry Potter series ===
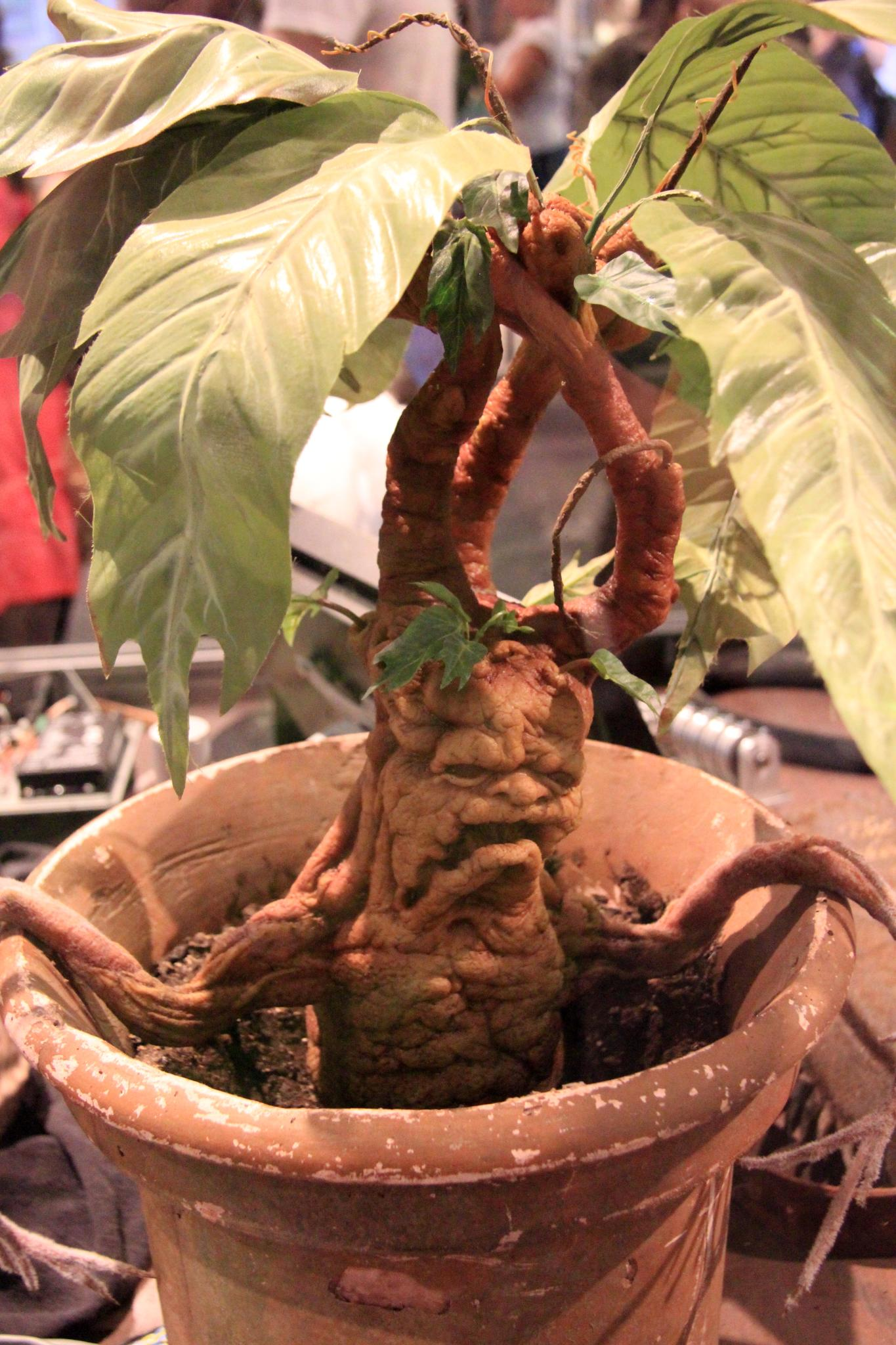
A Mandrake prop on display at Warner Bros. Studio Tour London: The Making of Harry Potter.

- Gurdyroot: A plant that resembles a green onion. It is the basis for a foul-tasting purple infusion brewed by the Lovegoods to fend off Gulping Plimpies. Considered not very original by gardening expert Charles Elliott, depending on a funny name for effect.
- Mandrake: Tubers that look like babies when young. Their screams can kill when fully grown. A potion made from mature mandrakes can reverse petrification.
- The Whomping Willow: A tree with animate, club-like branches hiding a secret passageway.

=== In Brandon Sanderson's Cosmere Series ===
On the planet Roshar (The Stormlight Archive)

- Firemoss: A red-brown moss that, when activated by rubbing between the thumb and forefinger, releases wisps of smoke that create feelings of euphoria when inhaled and is used as a recreational drug. Firemoss is highly addictive, limiting its medicinal use, though it is sometimes used to reduce cranial swelling and offer pain relief.
- Knobweed: Like most of the plants found on Roshar, knobweed has adapted to survive the planet's harsh storms. The reed-like stalk anchors itself directly to stone and the frond found at the top of the stalk has the ability to contract and retreat into the stalk during storms for protection. Knobweed reproduces by releasing fluffy pappuses that carry seeds into the air. The milky white sap found inside knobweed stems is a natural and highly valuable antiseptic used in the field and by established apothecaries.
- Prickletac: Prickletac plants are the colonies of much smaller living buds. As each generation of buds dies it converts to a hard, stony material which the next generation builds upon. Prickletac's reproductive system is based on this oddity – when a 'limb' grows too large it breaks off and falls to the ground, scattering living buds. Also known as Twisted Spine.
- Rockbuds: Rockbud is both a general term for several shelled plants on Roshar, including Lavis Polyps, Vinebuds, and Prickletac Shrubs, and the proper name for a specific plant. The true Rockbud plant is a shelled plant containing lengthy tendrils that reach out to lap up water (and occasionally animal blood). The size of fully grown rockbuds depends largely on climate. In colder climates they grow no larger than a human fist, while rockbuds in warm climates can grow to the size of a barrel. Rockbuds are harvested for consumption, limited medicinal uses, and paper making.
- Shalebark: A class of stony, fanlike plants often used for decoration and landscaping.

On the planet Nalthis (Warbreaker)

- Tears of Edgli: Vibrantly colored flowers that grow only in the temperate T'Telir climate. Highly valuable both economically and magically.

On the planet First of the Sun (Sixth of the Dusk);

- Unnamed Telepathic Trees: Many flora and fauna on this planet communicate with a form of natural telepathy. Certain unnamed plants living on the islands that make up the Pantheon send false thoughts of wounded or frightened animals to attract predators, which often fight and leave victims dead near enough to the tree to provide nutrition. These plants are not directly carnivorous.

On the planet Taldain (White Sand series)

- Dorim vines: Dorim vines live under the sand that covers most of Taldain's Dayside continent, reaching down to the water table where they fill themselves with water as a defensive mechanism against predators – the hard shells of many of the continents animals is dissolved by contact with water. Pouring water onto sand draws nearby vines out of the ground.

=== In Rebecca Yarros's Empyrean Series ===
==== In Fourth Wing ====
Sources:

- Fonilee Berries: The berries are purple in color but a light lavender color when unripe. They are found on a single vine near Iakabos River. Violet uses these berries against her first sparring opponent, Oren Seifert by sprinkling a dried powder of unripe berries on his scrambled eggs for breakfast. This causes him to experience nausea and limiting his ability to fight.
- Leighorrel mushrooms: Prior to her second fight, Violet put these mushrooms into the lunch of her opponent. This causes her opponent to experience hallucinations, making it difficult to concentrate on the fight, allowing Violet to win
- Zihna (root): Violet uses the root of this plant on her third opponent, causing him to experience numbness and making him unable to fight. These roots are found near the ravine.
- Tarsilla leaves: For Violet's fourth match, she puts Tarsilla leaves in her opponents tea prior to fighting. These leaves cause her opponent to experience blurry vision, making it difficult to fight.
- Carmine tree (bark): Violet puts the bark of the carmine tree in her opponents canteen to win her fifth sparring match. The bark causes extreme sickness similar to food poisoning, with nausea and sluggishness. Due to being in the canteen, the entire squad becomes ill, not just her opponent.
- Walwyn fruit peels: Prior to what would be her sixth match, Violet puts the fruit peels into the icing of her opponent breakfast, Rayma Corrie. These peels diminish coordination and balance when eaten. However, due to a mistiming, her opponent ends up going to the Healers and this fight does not occur.

=== Other ===
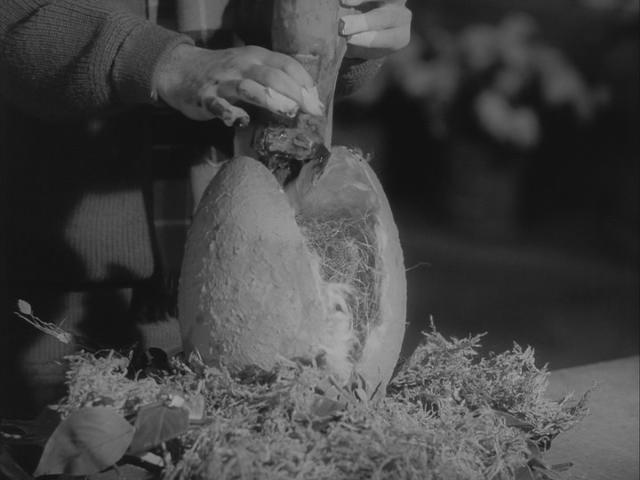
Audrey Jr. being fed in The Little Shop of Horrors (1960)

- Audrey Jr.: A human-eating plant in the 1960 film The Little Shop of Horrors
  - Audrey II: A singing, fast-talking alien plant with a taste for human blood in the stage show Little Shop of Horrors and the 1986 film of the same name.
- Avern: A deadly plant used for dueling, found in Gene Wolfe's fantasy novel Shadow of the Torturer.
- Bat-thorn: A plant, similar to wolfsbane, offering protection against vampires in Mark of the Vampire.
- Biollante: A kaiju created using Godzilla and plant DNA.
- Bush of many uses: A bush native to Vergon 6 in Futurama.
- Cactacae: A sentient, cactus-like species from China Miéville's Bas-Lag series.
- Dyson tree: A hypothetical genetically engineered plant capable of growing on a comet, suggested by the physicist Freeman Dyson.
- Flower of Life: A flower featured in some anime and manga series, such as Super Dimension Cavalry Southern Cross, Robotech, and Nurse Angel Ririka SOS.
- G'Quan Eth: A plant indigenous to the Narn homeworld, used as incense in religious ceremonies from Babylon 5. It is ritually burned as incense, and its seeds are a narcotic for Centauri when dropped in alcohol.
- Inkvine: A creeping plant that is used as a whip in the Dune universe.
- Integral Trees: Enormous trees from the science-fiction novel The Integral Trees by Larry Niven. They are 100 kilometers long and have a leafy "tuft" at each end oriented in opposite directions forming an ∫, the integral symbol.
- Kite-Eating Tree: A tree featured in the comic strip Peanuts.
- Krynoid: An extraterrestrial carnivorous plant in episode "The Seeds of Doom" from Doctor Who.
- Lyekka: A plant able to take the form of humans, usually a woman, in the TV-series Lexx.
- Mariphasa lupina lumina (Wolf Flower): A rare selenotropic, phosphorescent plant found only in the mountains of Tibet from Werewolf of London.
- The Mendacity Tree: A tree that grows when lies are whispered to it, and bears hallucinogenic fruit, in Frances Hardinge's novel The Lie Tree.
- Night Crawlers: Carnivorous and prehistoric plants that appear in the 1966 movie The Navy vs. the Night Monsters
- Plant Men of Barsoom: A race of humanoid plants from the Martian novels of Edgar Rice Burroughs
- Re-annual plants: Plants in Terry Pratchett's Discworld series which flower and grow before their seed germinates.
- Red weed: A red Martian plant appearing in The War of the Worlds.
- Sapient pearwood: A rare species of plant in Terry Pratchett's Discworld series. When sapient pearwood is crafted into an item, the product gains a semblance of magical life and becomes devoted to the owner.
- Snake vine: A dusky, variegated vine originating from The Sword of Truth. Its bite contains deadly tooth-like thorns that burrow into the skin and eventually kill the victim.
- Serenna veriformans: A fictional species of prehistoric fern tree that appears in the Jurassic Park franchise, its toxic spores being a major plot point in the original novel.
- Sukebind: A fictional flower in the novel Cold Comfort Farm by Stella Gibbons.
- Tesla trees: Large trees from the planet Hyperion in Hyperion Cantos. They store up electricity inside their body during certain seasons, releasing all of it in huge arcs of lightning from their crown.
- Tree-of-Life: The ancestor of yams, with similar appearance and taste, from Larry Niven's Known Space novels.
- Triffids: Carnivorous plants which possess a whip-like poisonous sting as well as mobility by three foot-like appendages, from the novel The Day of the Triffids (1951) by John Wyndham. They subsequently appeared in three different radio series (1958, 1968, 2001), a film (1962), a TV series (1981), a 2001 sequel novel by Simon Clark, and a two-part loose TV adaptation in 2009.
- Weirwood: A species of tree significant in George R. Martin's fantasy universe A Song of Ice and Fire.
- Nightlock: A fatally poisonous plant significant in Suzzane Collins' The Hunger Games series.

=== In Dungeons & Dragons ===
The role-playing game Dungeons & Dragons has a number of, according to Charles Elliott "not-very-ingenious", imaginary plant species, as well as "a taxonomy of fungal horrors", which Ben Woodard considers eerie not only for their poisonous nature, but because many have the ability to move.

- Basidirond: A giant multi-stemmed fungus creature.
- Hangman tree: A tree that will attempt to strangle anyone who ventures under it.
- Kelpie: A shape-shifting mass of animate seaweed that can imitate a woman or other creatures, and drowns its victims.
- Myconid: A "race of [man-sized] sentient fungus creatures", "some of which pack a mean punch", and which have the "ability to spray poisons that can disable their foes".
- Oaken defender: An enormous disk-shaped plant that lives in dryad groves and assists in their defense.
- Obliviax: A black moss that steals memories from intelligent creatures. The obliviax appeared on Geek.com's list of "The most underrated monsters of Advanced Dungeons & Dragons", because ingesting the moss can transfer the memories, an "interesting" concept which lends itself to "Christopher Nolan-esque adventures that will be both universally applauded and terribly confusing at the same time.".
- Phantom fungus: A dangerous subterranean plant that grapples victims with tentacles.
- Shambling mound: An atrocious plant-like creature, also called a shambler.
- Shrieker: Ambulatory fungus, which "can be used as cheap alarm systems for Underdark societies, but they possess no combat abilities of their own. The only thing a shrieker can do is shriek". Scott Baird of Screen Rant ranked the Shrieker among the weakest monsters in the game.
- Tendriculos: An enormous, savage, sentient plant resembling a huge, tangled shrubbery.
- Treant: Sentient, humanoid trees who protect forests from antagonists.
- Vegepygmy: A "mold man", a former human transformed by russet mold.
- Wood woad: A creature resembling big, burly, bestial men made entirely of wood and bark bearing, but without foliage.
- Yellow musk creeper: A creeping plant that drains the intelligence of its victims, killing them or turning them into "yellow musk zombies" under the plant's control.

=== In Monty Python's Flying Circus ===
The following plants appear in the David Attenborough sketch of the last Monty Python episode.

- Angolan sauntering tree (Amazellus robin ray).
- Gambian sidling bush.
- Puking Tree of Mozambique.
- The Turkish little rude plant.
- Walking tree of Dahomey (Quercus nicholas parsonus).

=== In Avatar ===
In the Avatar franchise, plants on Pandora have evolved according to the characteristics of their environment, which has a thicker atmosphere than Earth. Pandoran plants can communicate via a phenomenon called 'signal transduction'.

=== In video games ===
Video games frequently feature fictional plants as items that can be collected by the player, or occasionally appear as non-player characters.

- The Monster Hunter series has multiple fictional flowers and plants that can be gathered by the player character, including nulberries, might seeds, flowferns, and dragonstrike nuts.
- The titular plants from the Plants vs. Zombies series, which are used to defeat zombie enemies.
- Many of the titular Plant-element Monsters from the My Singing Monsters series, e.g. Potbelly.
- In The Legend of Zelda series, plants play a significant role. In many games, bomb flowers allow Link to explode rocks and obstacles. In Breath of the Wild and Tears of the Kingdom, Link can collect plants that grant him buffs when cooked. The Great Deku Tree, the guardian of the Korok Forest, is a recurring character in the franchise.
- Broc Flower: A medicinal plant appearing in the Fallout series.
- Various Pokémon species are Grass-type or based on plants. Prominent Grass-type Pokémon include the starter Pokémon Bulbasaur and Sprigatito, Floragato, and Meowscarada.
- Candypop Bud: A flower found in the Pikmin series. They transform Pikmin thrown into them into a certain color.
- Chuck the Plant: A plant found in several of LucasArts' games.
- Elowan: A race of plant-like creatures in Starflight computer game.
- Fire Flower: A flower from the Mario series that transforms Mario into Fire Mario.
- Flowey: A sentient flower who is one of the main antagonists of Undertale.
- Flowery: a flower turned humanoid in the dark world who serves as the main antagonist of Chapter 5 in Deltarune.
- The Seven Colored Flowers: flowers turned humanoid who serve as minibosses in Deltarune.
- Genesis trees: Trees located in the world of Legaia from the video game Legend of Legaia. They can keep a large area free of the Mist.
- Laganaphyllis simnovorii: A carnivorous cow-like plant found in The Sims series of games, commonly known as the Cowplant.
- Lunar Tears, from the Nier series.
- Nirnroot: A rare, alchemical plant from The Elder Scrolls series.
- Plantera: A massive pink flower from the game Terraria, resembling a venus flytrap.
- Piranha Plant: Plants with mouths from the Mario series, often depicted as sentient. An individual Piranha Plant appears as a playable DLC character in Super Smash Bros. Ultimate.
- Supox utricularia: A race of kind, sentient plant creatures from the Star Control series.
- Sylvari: A race of sapient plant people in the MMO Guild Wars 2, available as a playable race.
- Wumpa Fruit: A collectible fruit in the Crash Bandicoot franchise.
- Xander Root: A medicinal plant appearing in the Fallout series.
- Fool Eater: Carnivorous plant that snaps at any creature that comes close in the game Hollow Knight.

=== In comics ===
- Appearing in DC Comics, the Black Mercy is an extraterrestrial plant used a weapon by the supervillain Mongul. Described by Mongul as "something between a plant and an intelligent fungus", the Black Mercy attaches itself to its victims in a form of symbiosis, and feeds on their aura. The organism is telepathic and reads its victim's heart's desire, immersing them in an illusory world in which their actual surroundings are hidden.
- The Cotati are a plant-like species from the Marvel Comics universe who originate from the same planet as the Kree.

== In mythology ==
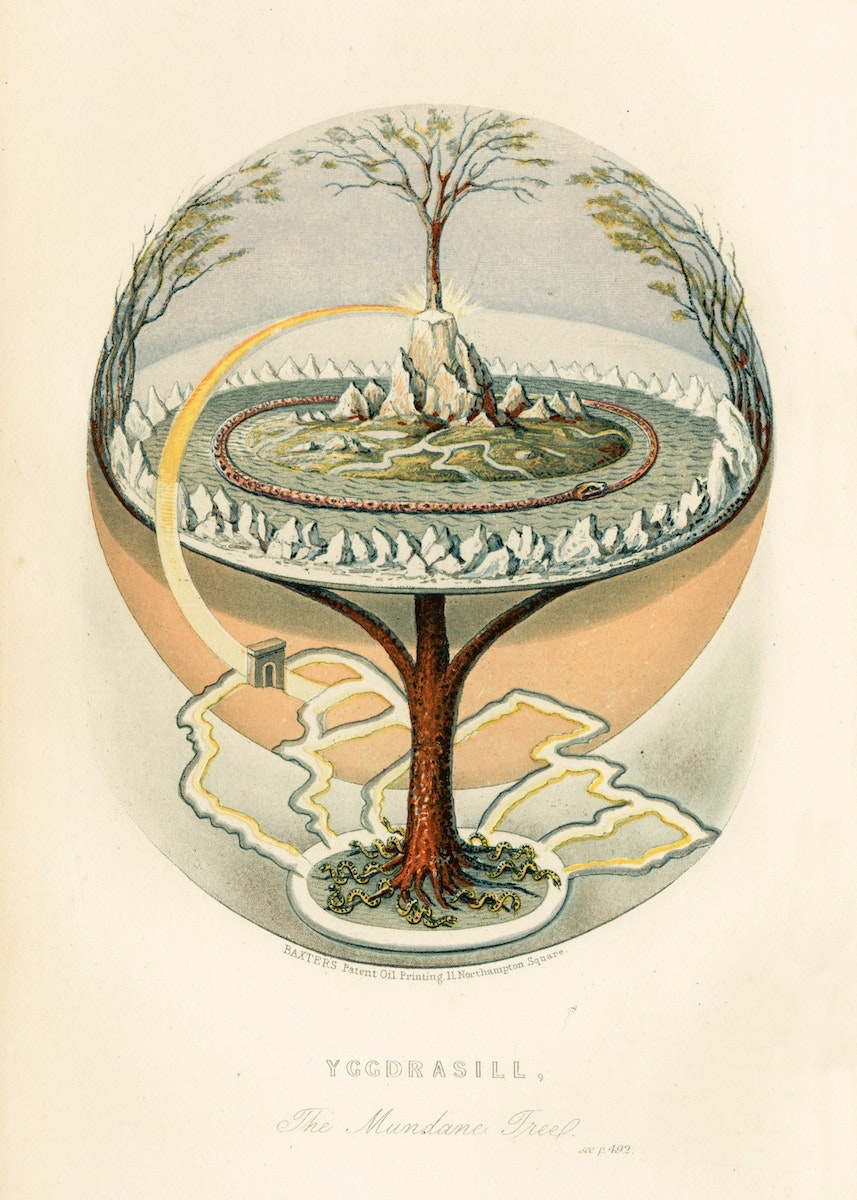
An 1847 illustration of the world tree Yggdrasil, by Oluf Bagge

- Aglaophotis: A type of Peony said to be magical.
- Austras koks: A tree which grows from the start of the Sun's daily journey across the sky in Latvian mythology.
- Barnacle tree: A mythical tree believed in the Middle Ages to have barnacles that opened to reveal geese. The story may have started from goose barnacles growing on driftwood.
- Fern flower: A magic plant in Baltic mythology thought to only bloom one night, sought by lovers.
- Lotus tree: A plant in Greek mythology bearing a fruit that causes pleasant drowsiness.
- Moly: A magic herb in Greek mythology with a black root and white blossoms.
- Raskovnik: A magic plant in Serbian mythology which can open any lock.
- Vegetable Lamb of Tartary: A mythical plant supposed by medieval thinkers to explain the existence of cotton.
- Yggdrasil: The world tree of Norse mythology.

== Hoaxes ==
- Man-eating plant: A fictitious tree in the forests of Madagascar that possesses mobile, ensnaring stems.
- Spaghetti tree: A tree from which spaghetti is harvested. It was an April Fool's Day joke launched by the BBC TV programme Panorama in 1957.

== See also ==
- Talking trees
- Tree (mythology)
- World tree
- Tree of life (disambiguation)
