= Overgrowth (novel) =

2025 horror novel by Mira Grant

- Author: Seanan McGuire, writing as Mira Grant
- Language: English
- Genre: Horror; science fiction
- Publisher: Tor Nightfire
- Publication date: 24 Apr 2025
- Publication place: United States
- Pages: 480
- ISBN: 9781837840946

Overgrowth is a 2025 science fiction horror novel by Seanan McGuire, writing under the pen name Mira Grant. The novel focuses on an alien invasion by a species of sentient carnivorous plants.

== Plot ==
A seed pod hidden inside a comet crashes to Earth, releasing alien plant life that begins to grow unnoticed. Meanwhile, Caroline Miller gives birth to a baby girl named Anastasia. When Anastasia is three years old, she wanders into the woods near her home and is eaten by one of the alien plants. The plant grows an identical copy of the little girl. Three days later, the duplicate arrives back home and informs Caroline that the real Anastasia has been replaced. Caroline dismisses this as a child's fantasy.

By 2031, an adult Stasia lives in Seattle with roommates Lucas and Mandy. She has spent decades informing her friends and acquaintances that she is an alien and that an invasion is coming. Some people dismiss her as quirky, while others consider her delusional. Stasia has recurrent dreams about a forest full of alien plant life. One day, NASA and the ISS confirm that they have received alien signals, indicating that Stasia's story is true.

Lucas dismisses the news as a hoax, while Mandy is more credulous. Stasia calls her long-distance boyfriend Graham, a scientist who has always believed her claims. Stasia and Graham travel to Maine. They are harassed by the TSA due to Stasia's claim of being an alien, but are allowed to continue their journey. On the plane, Stasia enters her dream forest. There, she meets a man named Jeff, another alien. When she awakens, plant-like material begins to grow through the skin of her arm.

In Maine, they meet Toni, the scientist who first identified the alien signal. Toni believes in the invasion because she was almost killed by an alien flower as a child. The police arrive to search for Stasia; the group is rescued by Jeff. Like Stasia, Jeff has a compulsion to tell everyone about his alien origins, indicating that this is an intentional feature of the alien advance scouts.

During their return flight, Stasia is apprehended by federal agents and taken to a holding facility. NASA scientists experiment on Stasia; the skin of her arm becomes progressively more plant-like. Mandy and Lucas infiltrate the facility and help Stasia escape.

The alien armada arrives. A scout ship crashes into the desert. Stasia is taken to the dream forest, where she meets an alien called First. First explains their life cycle to Stasia. The species is carnivorous, and the invasion is intended to provide a food source for the armada. They send seed pods to planets with sentient life, where the advance scouts take the form of the dominant species in order to ensure a more efficient extermination. Once enough scouts have sprouted, they create the dream forest, which summons the armada. The fleet then harvests the planet by killing its population before moving on to the next target world.

Stasia's group is attacked by a squad of humans. Lucas is killed. Stasia, Mandy, and Graham are brought before the Vice President of the United States in order to parley. Stasia plans to offer terms of surrender to humanity. As they begin negotiations with the Vice President, First arrives, revealing that there was never any plan for surrender.

Earth is harvested. Some humans are offered the chance to become plant-people like Stasia; most are eaten. Stasia reveals that she has been narrating the story to Graham, who has been consumed by a seed pod and is waiting to be reborn.

== Reception ==
Becky Spratford of Library Journal called the novel "bleak and unflinching, discomfitingly forcing readers to contemplate their own lives, choices, and places in the universe." Spratford called the novel "Grant's version" of Invasion of the Body Snatchers. The review concluded that it is "another engaging, existentially terrifying, and thought-provoking SF-tinged horror novel." James Gardner of Booklist gave the novel a starred review, stating that the nearly 500-page plot "slithers along briskly" and praising Stasia's character as "awkwardly charming and ultimately relatable". Gardner concluded that the novel is "a humorously horrifying apocalypse that shows off the best aspects of emotional (and human) storytelling." Cheyenne MacDonald of Engadget called the novel "a thrilling sci-fi horror story that's also at times lighthearted and funny."

Tony Jones of Horror DNA compared the book to both Invasion of the Body Snatchers and The Day of the Triffids, stating that "Triffids are wallflowers in comparison to what is heading towards Earth!" Jones praised the focus on the novel's characters, opining that "Overgrowth is not a smash-bang-wallop sort of story and is more concerned with the big questions of what it means to be human (but there is still some walloping)." The review concluded that the novel "is significantly more than just an alien invasion story; it’s a deeply imaginative and thoughtful exploration of identity, belonging, and the immensely powerful and dangerous unknown which might lurk in the stars."

Publishers Weekly called the novel "uneven" and "a rare miss from Grant." The review wrote that the worldbuilding was lush and the buildup suspenseful, but that the pacing flagged after the invasion began. The review also criticized the characterization, writing that the portrayal of Anastasia's transgender boyfriend Graham was particularly disappointing.
