= Trifid =

Trifid is Latin for "split into three parts" or "threefold" and may refer to:

- Trifid (journal), a Czech-language periodical
- Trifid Nebula in the constellation Sagittarius
- Trifid cipher, a fractionated cipher

== Distinguish from ==
- Triffid, a fictional dangerous mobile plant in the 1951 novel The Day of the Triffids by John Wyndham
- The Triffids, a popular Australian band named for the plant

== See also ==
- The Day of the Triffids (disambiguation)
