= The Day of the Triffids (film) =

1963 British film by Steve Sekely and Freddie Francis

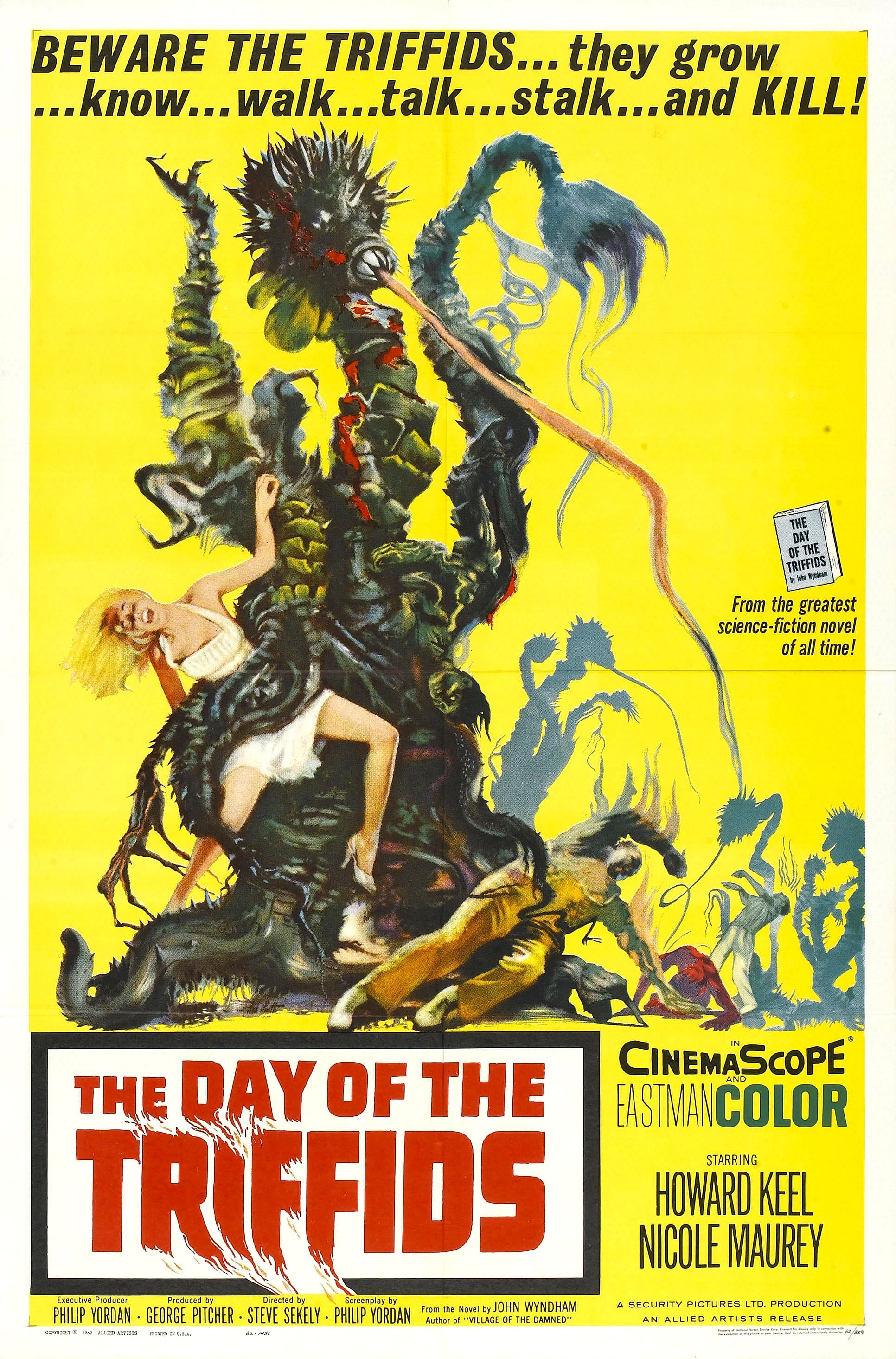
- US film poster by Joseph Smith
- Directed by: Steve Sekely (Note: Additional scenes directed by an uncredited Freddie Francis)
- Written by: Bernard Gordon (Note: Fronted by Philip Yordan)
- Produced by: George Pitcher
- Starring: Howard Keel; Nicole Maurey; Janette Scott; Kieron Moore; Mervyn Johns
- Cinematography: Ted Moore
- Edited by: Bill Lewthwaite; Spencer Reeve (sup.)
- Music by: Ron Goodwin; Johnny Douglas
- Production company: Security Pictures Ltd.
- Distributed by: Rank Organisation (UK)
- Release dates: 27 March 1963 (Kitchener, premiere); 2 May 1963 (UK)
- Running time: 93 minutes
- Country: United Kingdom
- Language: English

The Day of the Triffids is a 1963 British apocalyptic science-fiction horror film directed by Steve Sekely, loosely based on John Wyndham's 1951 novel of the same name. It stars Howard Keel, Nicole Maurey, Janette Scott, Kieron Moore and Mervyn Johns. The film was produced by Security Pictures and released in the UK by the Rank Organisation on 12 May 1963.

== Plot ==
A meteor shower blinds most of the world's population and spreads spores that cause triffid plants to become animated. Bill Masen, an American merchant marine, escapes the catastrophe after spending the night in a hospital with his eyes bandaged. At a railway station, he meets Susan, an orphaned schoolgirl who also avoided the blinding. They flee the chaotic streets and set off in an abandoned car to reach Masen's ship, but are attacked by a triffid along the way when the car becomes stuck and barely escape.

Elsewhere, scientist Tom Goodwin and his wife Karen, isolated in a lighthouse, learn of the global disaster via radio. After a triffid invades their lighthouse and is apparently killed, they discover the plants can regenerate themselves. They barricade themselves in and begin searching for a way to stop them.

Masen and Susan reach the docks and, after hearing troubling news over the radio, travel by boat to France. There they meet Christine Durant, who leads them to a château sheltering blind survivors. During a supply run with Mr Coker, a worker at the castle, they discover dozens of the plants and Coker is killed by one. Later, escaped convicts invade the château, allowing triffids to overrun it during the chaos. Only Bill, Susan and Christine survive, fleeing in a prison bus.

As they head toward the American naval base in Cádiz, they encounter a blind couple, Luis and Teresa de la Vega, and help her deliver a baby boy. Luis tells Masen that the Cadiz base has been evacuated by submarine since those who were underwater did not get blinded by the meteor shower. Masen gets de Vega's radio transmitter, which relays news of a final naval evacuation in Alicante. That night, after deciding to leave in the morning, he tries to electrify the villa's fence, but it fails due to weak electrical current. When triffids attack, Masen fends them off with a makeshift flamethrower and uses a noisy clown car to lure them away so the others can escape. He is then rescued by a naval dinghy.

Back at the lighthouse, triffids break in, forcing Tom and Karen to retreat upstairs. In a last-ditch effort, Tom turns a salt-water fire hose on the plants, causing them to dissolve in clouds of green smoke. He realizes that seawater is lethal to triffids and kills the rest of the plants in the lighthouse.

In the final scene, the narrator declares that humanity has triumphed over the triffids by turning to the very element that gave it life: the sea. Survivors from the submarine disembark and head to a church to give thanks for their survival.

== Cast ==
- Howard Keel as Bill Masen
- Nicole Maurey as Christine Durant
- Janina Faye as Susan
- Janette Scott as Karen Goodwin
- Kieron Moore as Tom Goodwin
- Mervyn Johns as Mr Coker
- Ewan Roberts as Dr Soames
- Alison Leggatt as Miss Coker
- Geoffrey Matthews as Luis de la Vega
- Gilgi Hauser as Teresa de la Vega
- John Tate as Captain of SS Midland
- Carole Ann Ford as Bettina
- Arthur Gross as Plane radioman
- Colette Wilde as Nurse Jamieson
- Ian Wilson as Greenhouse watchman
- Victor Brooks as Poiret
- Peter Dyneley as the narrator (voice, uncredited)

== Production ==
=== Development ===
The option to the film rights of Wyndham's novel were obtained by Albert R. Broccoli and Irving Allen in 1956, who hired longtime Hammer contributor Jimmy Sangster, to adapt it. In his autobiography, Sangster claimed he was paid for the script (which was reportedly very faithful to the original novel), but never heard back from the producers. By 12 September 1957 the trade paper Daily Film Renter reported that The Day of the Triffids "was to have been filmed by Warwick", indicating Warwick's involvement had ended by that point.

A six-month option was sold to John Temple-Smith's Major Productions Ltd. in June 1959. Temple-Smith was acting on behalf Orbit Films Ltd., one of Sydney Box's production companies. The only film completed under the Orbit banner was Subway in the Sky, with two other films by the same group of producers being made by other Box companies. In August 1959, it was reported that Orbit, with an American partner Philip Yordan's Security Pictures, had offered the lead to Fred MacMurray. However, Box suffered a cerebral haemorrhage and withdrew from all his film and television projects, most of which were cancelled outright or adopted by other production companies. John Temple-Smith had already resigned from Orbit to work on other Box projects, and with Box no longer available to back the 'Triffids' project, Yordan exercised Major's option to purchase the film rights for five years.

In January 1960, Frank and Maurice King of King Brothers Productions signed a co-production agreement dated 6 January with Security Pictures to film The Day of the Triffids. The partnership was made public in June 1960, when Kinematograph Weekly reported that the Kings would make the film from a Yordan script after completing Gorgo.

During this period, a screenplay was prepared for the Kings by Robert L. Richards, who had previously contributed to Gorgo. The King–Security partnership proved brief. By an agreement of termination dated 11 July 1960, the parties ended the contract after the Kings expressed dissatisfaction with Yordan's screenplay and Yordan rejected Richards' revision. The letter states: "Phil Yordan and I have at all times been desirous of having you conclude definite production plans with us. You have informed me that you are not satisfied with Yordan's screenplay, and Yordan has rejected the revision and rewrite of the screenplay by Robert Richards." Under its terms King Brothers were released from all further obligations.

Richards's screenplay is notable for introducing the concept that seawater is lethal to triffids, any water being used in the previous Yordan script. After the release of the film, Richards claimed his material had been appropriated and sought redress from the Kings, Yordan and Allied Artists.

In August 1960, Bernard Gordon was hired by Yordan to re-write the screenplay. Gordon remained anonymous due to his Hollywood blacklist status, and Yordan was credited on-screen, a practice known as "fronting" which Yordan was known to use. Gordon's credit was later restored by the Writers Guild of America.

In August 1961 Security Pictures lined up distribution for The Day of the Triffids, with the Rank Organisation handling the United Kingdom and Allied Artists taking the Western Hemisphere. Using those distribution contracts as collateral, the company obtained a $1.23 million production loan from the Bank of America. With the financing in place, Security finalized its agreement with Rank to produce the film at Shepperton Studios.

=== Principal photography ===
Production began in September 1961. It was the first British film for director Steve Sekely, who had been involved with the project for over two years, having initially suggested Yordan as a production partner to Nasht. Howard Keel recalled Sekely as "a lovely man with a thick Hungarian accent and a habit of offering a direction and walking away from you, so you caught very little of what he said. But somehow you knew what he wanted. We all loved him and his humor."

Keel said, "The script was awful and was rewritten by the producer and his wife, which only made it worse." Keel said filming was cut short as the producers ran out of money before they had the chance to film the climax of the film, a sequence where the triffids are lured to their death in the sea. According to correspondence held in the John Wyndham Archive, Sekely wrote to Wyndham that these sequences were filmed by a second unit in Spain [using doubles for the principal actors], headed by uncredited producer Bernard Glasser, as Sekely's directorial duties were confined to his work in England.

The film was shot in CinemaScope and Eastmancolor.

=== Re-editing and reshoots ===
After Allied Artists head Steve Broidy viewed an initial cut of the film and expressed dissatisfaction, Yordan travelled to London with Gordon to address the problem. Along with Glasser, and editor and production troubleshooter Lester Sansom, they reviewed the existing footage and concluded that new material would be required to bring the film up to feature length.

Much of the triffid sequences filmed in Spain were judged to be unusable. The rejected material included both the triffid effects shots and most of the film's original climax, so the replacement footage had to provide a new conclusion to the film.

Gordon later recalled that Yordan blamed the producer and director for the film running short, although Glasser stated that the primary cause was the removal of effects sequences that proved technically unsuccessful or too expensive to complete. Glasser explained that the mechanical limitations of the triffid models meant that much of the action called for in the script could not be realised, forcing schedule changes and deletions. He also noted that Yordan was constrained by the need to spend most of the budget in the United Kingdom in order to qualify for a government subsidy under the Eady Plan. Glasser stated that this was not the fault of director Steve Sekely.

To fill the gaps created by the excisions, Yordan commissioned Gordon to devise a replacement storyline that could be filmed without recalling the original cast, who were considered too expensive to bring back. Gordon produced a treatment for a lighthouse-based subplot involving only two characters, designed to be integrated with the existing footage and to supply the missing climax. The screenplay for these sequences was written by Jon Manchip White from Gordon's treatment, although Yordan had given White the impression that he had written the story himself.

The resulting material ran for approximately twenty minutes. The additional scenes were directed by Freddie Francis and filmed over three weeks, from Monday 24 September to Wednesday 3 October 1962, on Stage 6, at MGM-British Studios. Francis recalled, "We didn’t make it a good film, but at least we made it acceptable to the people who were going to put money in."

In addition to the lighthouse material and model shots of the lighthouse, some second-unit footage was shot in Cornwall by Glasser. In August 1962 Glasser said "I am pleased with the film now. But it's an experience I'll be happy to forget."

== Comparisons to source material ==
Although the film retained some basic plot elements and characters from the original novel, it is not a particularly faithful adaptation: "It strays significantly and unnecessarily from the book and is less well regarded than the BBC's intelligent (if dated) 1981 TV serial". Unlike in the novel, the triffids arrive from a meteor shower, some of the action is moved to France and Spain, and an important character, Josella Playton, is deleted. Most seriously, the screenplay supplies a simplistic solution to the triffid problem: salt water dissolves them and "the world was saved".

== Release ==
The Day of the Triffids premiered in Kitchener, Canada on 27 March 1963. It was released to cinemas in the United States on 27 April. Regional engagements began earlier in Texas, with the Rialto Theatre in Refugio advertising screenings for 28–30 March 1963, and the Cherokee Theatre in Rusk advertising the film as part of a double bill on 4–5 April 1963. In the United Kingdom it was released by the Rank Organisation in early May 1963 on the Odeon circuit, double-billed with The Legion's Last Patrol; engagements began on 2 May.

=== Restoration and rights status ===
After the film's initial run, the rights to the picture reverted to producer Philip Yordan, who eventually transferred them to screenwriter Bernard Gordon and his business partner, Richard Rosenfeld. In an effort to generate quick income from the picture, they sold non-exclusive home video rights to a number of discount VHS labels.

This move incensed film restoration expert Mike Hyatt, who had been a fan of the picture since his youth. Hyatt was able to obtain the well-worn original negative from Gordon, while Rosenfeld, still short of money, sold Hyatt the North American theatrical and home video rights. Hyatt then began an arduous and decades-long effort to restore the film, resorting to manually using a jeweler's loupe and a needle to pick specks of dirt out of the emulsion side of the negative. Hyatt eventually had an interpositive struck from the restored negative which in 2010 was shown at the Museum of Modern Art in New York City. By the fall of 2014, Hyatt had obtained the majority of the worldwide rights to the film and had planned to arrange a 4K digital scan of the negative. The status of the project was unclear when Hyatt died in February 2024.

Following Hyatt's death, Dutch label Ignite Films, which had announced a photochemical restoration of the film in 2009 and held international rights to the title, announced a UK Blu-ray edition. The release was first reported on Blu-ray.com in November 2025, with coverage noting it was "Presumably, this is the restoration that Mike [Hyatt] worked on for many years". The film was subsequently listed on Amazon.co.uk as The Day of the Triffids [Blu-ray] from Ignite Films with a release date of 14 December 2026,

== Reception ==
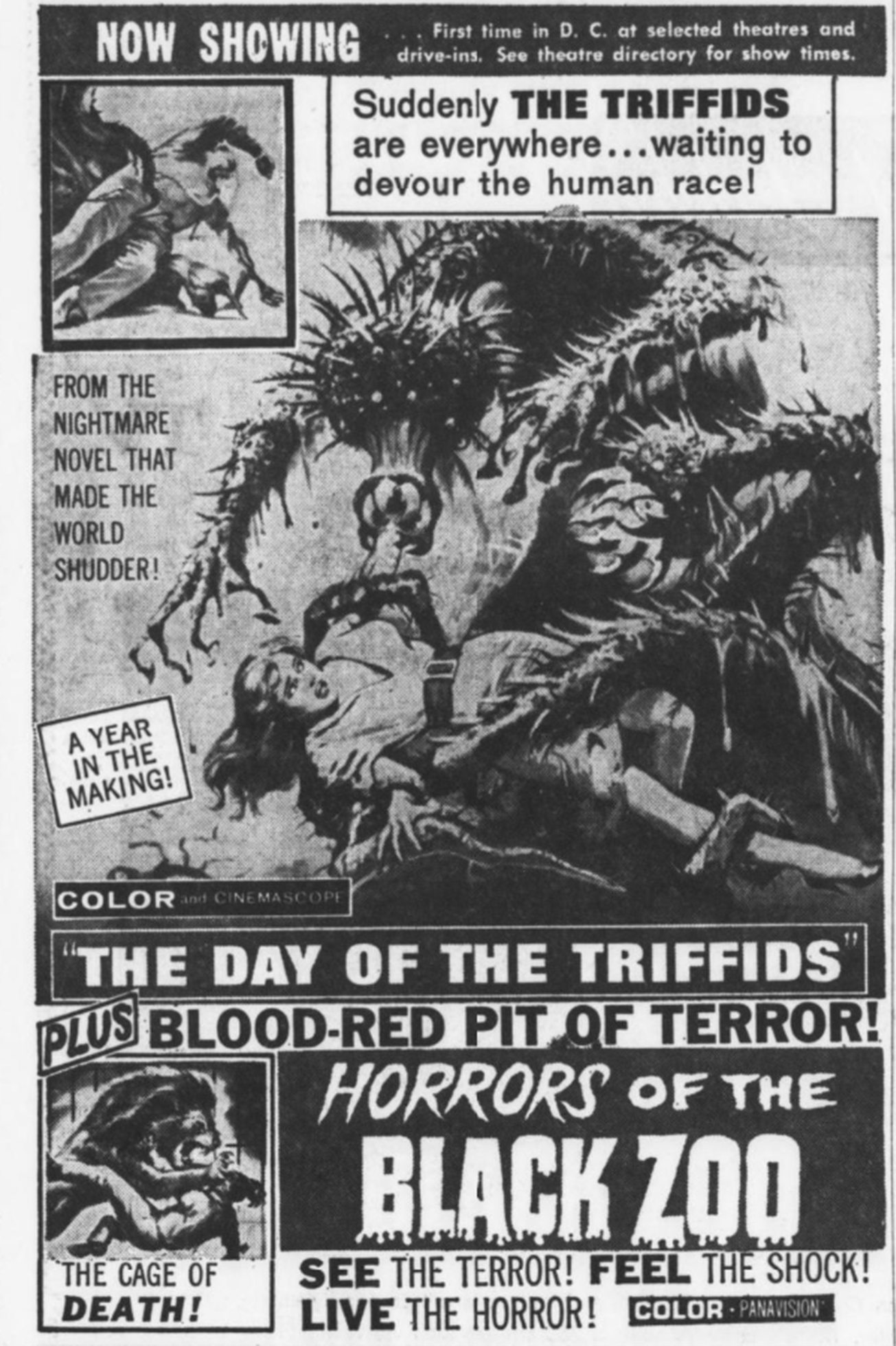
Theatrical advertisement from 1963 as double feature with Horrors of the Black Zoo

=== Box office ===
Glasser later remarked that the film performed well commercially for Allied Artists.

=== Critical response ===
Simon Clark, author of The Night of the Triffids, stated in an interview:

The film version is enjoyable, luring the effective-looking Triffids away with music from an ice-cream van and some other good action scenes. The Triffids' death-by-seawater climax is weak and contrived though. But it would still rank in my all-time top 100 films.

Halliwell's Film Guide claimed the film was a "rough and ready adaptation of a famous sci-fi novel, sometimes blunderingly effective and with moments of good trick work".

Filmink argued "It’s a shame that when Rank finally dipped its toe in sci-fi waters... the result was such a mess.... People love this movie, but we don’t think even its most rabid fans would call it well made."

At the film review aggregator website Rotten Tomatoes, the film holds an approval rating of 79% based on 19 reviews, with a weighted average rating of 6.4/10.

== See also ==
- Chromolaena odorata
- The Day of the Triffids (1981 TV series)
- The Night of the Triffids, a 2001 sequel to Wyndham's book by Simon Clark
- The Day of the Triffids (2009 TV series)
