= Julia Joyce =

British actress (born 1998)

- Born: 14 June 1998 (age 26)
- Occupation(s): Film and television actress, singer- songwriter

Julia Joyce (born 14 June 1998) is a British actress, known for her appearance as a younger version of Billie Piper's characters in Doctor Who ("Father's Day") and Mansfield Park, as well as for a role in Ruby in the Smoke. She is also the younger sister of the actress, model and Petits Filous advert star Lucy Joyce; Julia later went on to become the face of Petits Filous in her own right.

== Filmography ==
=== Film ===
| Year | Film | Role | Notes |
|---|---|---|---|
| 2006 | January 2nd | Jodie | |
| 2006 | Sally Lockhart Mysteries: The Ruby in the Smoke | Young Sally | Television film |
| 2007 | Mansfield Park | Young Fanny | Television film |
| 2007 | Who Killed Mrs De Ropp? | Jane | Television film |
| 2008 | Speed Racer | Blonde Pack Leader | |
| 2008 | The Long Walk to Finchley | Carol Thatcher | Television film |

=== Television ===
| Year | Film | Role | Notes |
|---|---|---|---|
| 2003 | Prime Suspect | Lukic's Daughter | Episode: "The Last Witness: Part 2" |
| 2005 | Life Isn't All Ha Ha Hee Hee | Janet's Child | Miniseries |
| 2005 | Doctor Who | Young Rose | Episode: "Father's Day" |
| 2006 | Casualty | Rachel Dryver | Episode: "Abide with Me" |
| 2007 | Waking the Dead | Kate | Episode: "Mask of Sanity" |
| 2007 | Lewis | Izzie Mallory | Episode: "Expiation" |
| 2008 | Casualty | Beth Elizabeth Grey | Episode: "Have a Go, Hero" |
| 2009 | Torchwood | Holly Frobisher | Series 3 regular; 5 episodes |
| 2009 | Doctors | Alice Rose | Episode: "Once Upon a Time" |
| 2009 | The Day of the Triffids | Imogen | Episode: "Part 2" |
