= Lance Dann =

British sound artist, audio drama producer, presenter, and writer

- Education: Goldsmiths' College, Bath Spa University
- Known for: Podcasting; audio drama
- Awards: Sony Radio Academy Awards (2)

Lance Dann is a British sound artist, audio drama producer, presenter, and writer. He has worked for international theatre and radio since 1994.

== Early life and education ==
Lance Dann studied radio at Goldsmiths' College and gained his doctorate at Bath Spa University in 2011.

== Career ==
Dann is the founder of radio art group Noiseless Blackboard Eraser (1994–2007) and former associate member of The Wooster Group.

As a radio artist he has worked extensively with composer Rohan Kriwaczek on a series of works for BBC Radio 3, BBC Radio 4 and independent stations internationally. Their collaborations included a long-running series of live radio performances and a trilogy of experimental plays for radio (If on a Summer Night a Listener..., Ho! Ho! The Clown is Dead and Glowboys). Between 1996 and 2000 he worked with The Wooster Group as producer of a sequence of plays for BBC Radio 3 (The Emperor Jones, Phèdre and The Peggy Carstairs Report). He worked as sound designer for the company during the development of To You the Birdie and through performances of House/Lights. In 1999 he recorded two documentaries with Yoko Ono for BBC Radio 3, the first time she'd spoken at length to the British media for over 20 years. In 2001 he wrote a serialisation of John Wyndham's The Day of the Triffids for the BBC WorldService. His 2009 transmedia audio series The Flickerman was serialised on ABC National Radio (Australia), VPRO (Holland) and WFMU (New York). His work in radio and theatre has earned a number of awards including two Sony Radio Academy Awards, a Prix Marulić and in 2014 his independently produced drama The Hungry Earth was nominated for a Radio Academy Production Award.

In 2017 he created the multi-part audio drama series Blood Culture which won the Gold Award for Best Drama Producer and the Bronze Award for Best Sound Designer at the 2018 Audio Production Awards, the Silver Award for Fiction at the 2018 British Podcast Awards, was nominated for a Radio Academy ARIAS award, and was for nominated for a BBC Audio Drama Award. Between 2021 and 2023 he series produced three series of The Rez, a children’s audio and multimedia project, the podcast parts of which were distributed by Gen Z-Media and Wondery. The series won him the Gold Award for Best Entertainment Producer and the Silver Award for Best Comedy Producer at the 2021 Audio Production Awards, a Bronze British Podcast Award, a Bronze ARIAS award for drama, a Bronze Signal Award, and a Bronze Lovie (it was also nominated at the Webby Awards, and the British Podcast Awards). In 2022 he created and produced The Day the Earth Didn't Die, a comedy drama series distributed by Audible.

Dann has also presented documentaries and podcasts for the BBC and other audio networks, these include the 2017 Radio 4 documentary Art in Miniature and the 2020 Radio 3 documentary Diorama Drama.

With Martin Spinelli he co-authored Podcasting: The Audio Media Revolution, the first critical analysis of the emergent form of podcasting. It was published by Bloomsbury Academic in 2019, and was a finalist of the American Association of Publishers Prose Awards.
