= Security Pictures =

Security Pictures was a film production company of Philip Yordan and Sidney Harmon.

The company began in 1947 as Yordan Enterprises, with Mike Frankovich in partnership with Yordan. It was renamed Security Pictures. The initial production was Anna Lucasta in 1949. This was based on Philip Yordan's hit Broadway play, and Yordan co-wrote the script and producer.

By 1952 Harmon and Lerner were working for Security Pictures on the film Man Crazy, which Yordan and Harmon wrote and produced, and Lerner directed. In 1954 Security co produced The Big Combo with the company of Cornel Wilde.

In 1956 Security Pictures signed an eleven picture contract with United Artists starting with The Wild Party. The two most successful movies of the company, Men in War and God's Little Acre, were directed by Anthony Mann. The company became famous for giving work to many victims of the Hollywood blacklist including Ben Maddow and Bernard Gordon. Harmon produced another version of Anna Lucasta but it was made for Longridge Enterprises. In 1959 Security signed a four picture deal with Columbia.

Security Pictures shifted to Europe in the 1960s, being mostly based in Spain. In 1963 Security Pictures announced they would make ten films for Allied Artists over two and a half years, including The Tribe That Lost Its Head; Gretta, based on a book by Erskine Caldwell; a Western called Bad Man's River; and a science fiction film Crack in the World. Some of these were not made. Among those that were made were The Thin Red Line.

The company wound up in the late 1960s and Yordan went to work for Benmar Productions.

== Select films ==
- Anna Lucasta (1949) - distributed by Columbia
- Man Crazy (1953) - distributed to 20th Century Fox
- The Big Combo (1955) - co production with Theodora, released by Allied Artists
- The Wild Party (1956) aka Step Down to Terror - released by United Artists
- Four Boys and a Gun (1957) - released by United Artists
- Men in War (1957) - released by United Artists
- Street of Sinners (1957) - released by United Artists
- God's Little Acre (1958) - released by United Artists
- Island Women (1958) - released by United Artists
- Day of the Outlaw (1959) - released by United Artists
- Studs Lonigan (1960) - released by United Artists
- Day of the Triffids (1963) - released by Allied Artists and Rank
- The Thin Red Line (1964) - released by Allied Artists
- Crack in the World (1965) - released by Paramount
- The Battle of the Bulge (1965)
- Custer of the West (1967) - released by Cinerama
- The Royal Hunt of the Sun (1969) - released by Cinerama
