= Troy Glasgow =

British actor

- Born: Waterloo, London, England
- Occupation: Actor
- Years active: 2001–present

Troy Glasgow is a British actor.

== Career ==
Troy Glasgow was born in Waterloo, London. He attended the BRIT School in 2001 and graduated in 2003. Whilst there he gained small roles in British television shows such as The Bill, Doctors and Holby City. He gained his first lead role in the Channel 4 one off drama Sex, footballers and videotape. After stints at the National Theatre, Birmingham Rep theatre and a cameo appearance in the 2008 film Adulthood, and played Trife's cousin Jehvon, who is seeking revenge on Noel Clarke's character Sam Peel for killing Trife. He went on to appear in Skins, Doctor Who and The Day of the Triffids.

== Filmography ==
=== Television ===
Year	Television Show	Role	Other notes
2002	Out of Control	Justin	TV film
2002	Babyfather	Friend 1	
2003	Doctors	Curtis Hooper	
2004	Sex, Footballers and Videotape	Jason Gill	(TV movie)
2005	Judge John Deed	Mono Simmons	
2005	Mr Harvey Lights a Candle	Maurice	
2005	Crossing Bridges	Bro	
2005	Holby City	Todd Nixon	
2006	The Bill	Ashley Morgan	
2006	Shoot The Messenger	Warren	
2007	Y Pris	Jamal	
2008	M.I.High	Mr B / Reginald Lacey	
2008	Ashes to Ashes	Ska Boy	
2008	Skins	Ace	
2008	Genie In The House	Felix	
2009	The Day of the Triffids	Troy	
2010	Doctor Who	Angelo	
2011	Londons Burning	Lee	TV film

=== Films ===
Year	Film	Role	Other notes
2008	Adulthood	Jehvon (Trife's cousin)	
2013	World War Z	Marine	Argus Sailors

== Theatre ==
In 2008 Troy originated the role of Tobias Rich in the world premiere of Harper Regan at the National Theatre by British playwright Simon Stephens alongside Lesley Sharp as Harper Regan.
