= Men in War =

1957 film by Anthony Mann

- Original film poster
- Directed by: Anthony Mann
- Written by: Philip Yordan
- Based on: Day Without End (Combat); 1949 novel by Van Van Praag
- Produced by: Sidney Harmon; Anthony Mann (uncredited)
- Starring: Robert Ryan; Aldo Ray
- Cinematography: Ernest Haller
- Edited by: Richard C. Meyer
- Music by: Elmer Bernstein
- Production company: Security Pictures
- Distributed by: United Artists
- Release date: January 26, 1957
- Running time: 102 minutes
- Country: United States
- Language: English
- Box office: $1.5 million (US)

Men in War is a 1957 black-and-white American war film about the Korean War directed by Anthony Mann and starring Robert Ryan and Aldo Ray as the leaders of a small detachment of American soldiers cut off and desperately trying to rejoin their division. The events of the film take place on one day; 6 September 1950. The picture was based on a 1949 World War II novel of the Normandy campaign Day Without End by Van Van Praag that was retitled Combat in 1951. Made soon after the end of the Korean War, which was still very much in the minds of the American public.

Some sources claim that credited screenwriter Philip Yordan was actually fronting for the blacklisted Ben Maddow. The Pentagon refused any cooperation with the producer and condemned the film for its depiction of a US Army unit without discipline.

Most of the same cast and crew made God's Little Acre the following year.

== Plot ==
On 6 September 1950, an isolated and exhausted platoon of the 24th Infantry Division is cut off. In addition to losing radio contact, the platoon is harassed by unseen North Korean infiltrators who silently kill the Americans and take their weapons. Platoon leader Lieutenant Benson has only vague instructions to reach a certain hill to link up with American forces.

The patrol stops a jeep driven by Staff Sergeant "Montana" and shell-shocked passenger "the Colonel" from the First Cavalry Division. The Colonel is unable to speak and is tied to his seat. After the Battle of the Nakdong River, where "our men fell like rain", the tough experienced Montana decided he and his colonel, whom he treats like his father, have had enough of the war. Benson commandeers their jeep for his platoon's equipment and the battle-fatigued Corporal Zwickley.

The platoon makes its way towards the hill. Montana disobeys Benson by instinctively shooting a surrendering North Korean sniper, who turns out to have a concealed weapon inside his hat. Sergeant Killian is killed while covering the rear after absentmindedly filling his helmet net with flowers. Montana takes his place and feigns fatigue, luring the infiltrators into the open, where he kills them.

The cynical Montana transforms the platoon back into a military formation while also curing Zwickley's neurosis by slapping him around. The platoon successfully carries on through sniper attack, artillery barrage, and land mines during which Platoon Sergeant Lewis panics and is killed.

When they reach the hill, they find it held by the North Koreans. Montana shoots three enemy soldiers disguised as Americans after a North Korean prisoner is used as bait and killed by his own side. Benson and his men launch an attack, but Montana and the colonel sit it out. The colonel comes to his senses, joins the assault, and is killed. Shamed, Montana joins Benson. They use grenades and a flamethrower to destroy a pillbox and a machine-gun nest.

Only Benson, Montana, and Sergeant Riordan survive. When American reinforcements arrive, Montana produces a container of medals that the colonel meant to award his men. Benson calls the roll of the men in his platoon in alphabetic order (including those killed in the attack) as Montana throws the medals to the dead on the slope of the hill.

== Cast ==
- Robert Ryan as Lieutenant Benson
- Aldo Ray as Staff Sergeant Joseph R. "Montana" Willomet
- Robert Keith as the Colonel
- Phillip Pine as Sergeant Riordan (as Philip Pine)
- Nehemiah Persoff as Sergeant First Class Nate Lewis
- Vic Morrow as Corporal James Zwickley
- James Edwards as Staff Sergeant Killian
- L. Q. Jones as Staff Sergeant Samuel Davis
- Scott Marlowe as Private Meredith
- Adam Kennedy as Private Maslow
- Race Gentry as Private Haines
- Walter Kelley as Private First Class Ackerman
- Anthony Ray as Private Penelli
- Robert Normand as Private Christensen
- Michael Miller as Private Lynch
- Victor Sen Yung as North Korean Prisoner / Sniper

== Production ==
Unable to get tanks and military extras from the Pentagon, Mann and composer Bernstein concentrated on the landscape, Bronson Canyon. Enemy soldiers are rarely seen, and the isolation of the platoon is conveyed strongly. Mann had previously made film noirs in the late 1940s and Westerns in the early to mid-1950s and combined elements of both in his first war film.

Phil Yordan later recalled he wrote the film at 150 pages then Mann "went through the script, he reduced it to eighty-two pages. He threw out all the dialogue. Of course, I put all of the dialogue back in to get Aldo Ray and Robert Ryan to play it. I said to him, "What am I going to do if you send them this script? They won't show up!"

I wanted to tell a story of the detail of war. The detail of war is what all the soldiers went through: that they had sand in their boots; that their gun jammed; that they took off their helmets at the wrong time; that they had to walk through forests of mines; or walk through bombardments. I was interested only in the foot soldier. Nobody knows why they have to take such and such a hill. They just are told to take it. So I lived with the guys, and I wanted to tell the story through tiny personal incidents. I used simple people – and did it all in twenty-four days. Actually, we had two units working side by side. I think it did come off."

— Director Anthony Mann interviewed in Screen, July/October 1969
