= Emma Relph =

British actress

Emma Relph is a British actress, best known for her role of Jo in The Day of the Triffids. She trained at the Central School of Speech and Drama. She is the daughter of Michael Relph and half-sister of Simon Relph. She now works as a professional astrologer and counsellor, teaches Kundalini yoga and Curative Astrology, and is a leader of Dances of Universal Peace.

Relph appeared in the music video for "Penthouse and Pavement" by Heaven 17.

== Filmography ==
- The Day of the Triffids (1981)
- From a Far Country (1981)
- The Professionals (1983)
- Chessgame (1983)
- Eureka (1983)
- Screen Two: In the Secret State (1985)
- Bulman (1985)
- The Witches (1990)
