= The Day of the Triffids (2009 TV series) =

2009 British television drama series

- Genre: Horror; Post-apocalyptic science fiction
- Written by: Patrick Harbinson
- Directed by: Nick Copus
- Starring: Dougray Scott; Joely Richardson; Brian Cox; Vanessa Redgrave; Eddie Izzard; Jason Priestley; Jenn Murray; Julia Joyce
- Country of origin: United Kingdom
- Original language: English
- No. of episodes: 2

Production
- Producers: Michael Preger; Stephen Smallwood
- Running time: 90 minutes / episode
- Production company: Power / Prodigy Pictures
- Budget: $15,000,000 (estimated)

Original release
- Network: BBC One; BBC HD
- Release: 28 December – 29 December 2009

The Day of the Triffids is a drama made in 2009. It is a loose adaptation of John Wyndham's 1951 eponymous novel. The novel had been adapted in 1962 as a theatrical film and by the BBC in a 1981 series.

== Plot ==
=== Part one ===
In an alternate version of contemporary Great Britain, triffids are large carnivorous plants capable of vicious and intelligent behaviour, equipped with venomous stingers that they use to stun their prey before feeding on them. Bill Masen (Dougray Scott), whose mother was killed by a triffid in the 1970s, explains how the oils the triffids produce came to be used as a new alternative fuel, putting an end to climate change. Triffids are kept in warehouses all over the world. Some people protest against the treatment of the plants. One of these activists (Ewen Bremner) breaks into a compound for male triffids outside London and is arrested.

Bill is injured by an undeveloped plant in the attempt, having given his safety goggles to another worker, Lucy (Nora-Jane Noone), a security officer and friend. Lucy rushes him to the hospital. With his eyes covered in bandages, he misses a massive solar eruption which occurs that night, the bright light of which is seen all over the world. The rays prove to be more dangerous than first thought, as they suddenly intensify to a horrific brilliance and more than 95 per cent of the world's population is blinded.

An aircraft heading toward London crashes when the solar storm blinds the pilots and all but one of the passengers on board. The sole-sighted man (Eddie Izzard) barricades himself in the toilet and covers himself with life vests. Narrowly surviving the crash, the man takes the name Torrence, after the destroyed Westminster road. Back at the hospital, Bill regains his sight but has no idea of how the world has changed overnight. Chaos reigns in the streets, with many of the blind struggling to find their way. Bill saves Radio Britain personality Jo Playton (Joely Richardson) from a throng of desperate blind citizens who have realised that she can see and are trying to use her as a guide.

Jo was in the London Underground at the time of the solar flare and was not blinded. The pair team up to find out what has happened, but Bill's only concern is the triffids, knowing that the catastrophe must have caused the electricity at the compounds, the only thing keeping the populace safe, to fail. Bill and Jo soon spot a signal from a university tower, a message to sighted people. Upon arrival, they find that a group of surviving members of the civil service and armed forces has been assembled to continue the human race as best it can. Bill is angered by how little warning there is of the encroaching triffids. He attempts to escape but is captured by Coker (Jason Priestley), who uses him to round up survivors and supplies for the cause, oblivious to the disaster that is about to unfold.

=== Part two ===
Bill and Coker are nearly killed during a late-night attack by a group of triffids. Fearing the worst is yet to come they travel on foot to a new religious colony run by Durrant (Vanessa Redgrave), now the Mother Superior. Despite its secluded location, Bill is aware that the triffids may return, and worse, could reproduce faster thanks to a cluster of beehives. He decides to leave for Shirning, hoping to find his estranged father Dennis (Brian Cox) and a solution to stop the triffids. Outside the church, he finds the body of Father Thomas, sacrificed by Durrant to the triffids. He returns in anger and surprises Durrant, who leaves the colony and insists that the society will collapse without her.

During his journey to Shirning, Bill meets two orphaned but sighted girls, Imogen (Julia Joyce) and Susan (Jenn Murray), who almost kill him with potshots in the process. The three arrive but are ambushed by a mysterious figure, who reveals himself as Dennis. Upon returning to Shirning House, protected from triffid attacks by a powerful electric fence, Bill is reunited with Jo, who narrowly escaped Torrence's men the night before. Dennis reveals to Bill his plan to stop the triffids, intending to genetically engineer a new species to neutralise the old one. Though Bill finds the idea absurd, he agrees to retrieve the last part of the experiment, a male triffid head.

Finding the head during a daring break into an abandoned plantation, the new triffid proves to be a success. At the same time, Coker drops some papers off at the house, which explains that a colony had been established on the Isle of Wight. Dennis' examination of his wife's triffid recordings causes the growing triffid to react, attacking him with its stinger. Bill attempts to free his father, firing at the triffid through its head. With Dennis dead and the subject destroyed, the group has no option but to leave for the Isle of Wight.

Before they can leave, Torrence arrives at the house with a group of men, looking for the solution to the triffids but Bill refuses to tell him the plan. Torrence threatens to kill the group if he doesn't find a new scheme by the next morning. Bill plans an escape, using the same recordings that killed his father to draw in more triffids as a diversion. Their plans are nearly thwarted by one of the soldiers, a rookie cadet named Troy (Troy Glasgow), who defects to them by faking their deaths to Torrence. The inactive fence is destroyed by the triffid swarm, trapping everybody in the house and grounds but one of the girls picks up an old folk mask from Bill's old things, causing him to remember something from 30 years previous. He was told that if you drip triffid poison into your eyes through the slots in the mask, the liquid will not blind you, but it will make the plants think you are one of them. Realizing that this is the solution they've been looking for, he administers the treatment to himself, Jo, Troy, Susan, and Imogen. It allows them to pass through the triffids unharmed, but Torrence and his remaining forces are eventually overwhelmed and killed.

The family is next seen on the Isle of Wight after settling into the colony. With the group protected from the triffids by the Solent, Bill still wonders about eventually returning to the mainland and questions the moral of how the world was blind even when our eyes were open.

== Cast ==
- Dougray Scott as Bill Masen
- Joely Richardson as Jo Playton
- Jason Priestly as Coker
- Eddie Izzard as Torrence
- Brian Cox as Dennis Masen
- Vanessa Redgrave as Durrant
- Jenn Murray as Susan
- Julia Joyce as Imogen
- Lizzie Hopley as Hilda
- Troy Glasgow as Troy
- Ewen Bremner as Walter Strange
- Shane Taylor as Osman
- Adam Sinclair as Ashdown
- Genevieve O'Reilly as Michelle Beadley

== Production notes ==
In November 2008, it was announced that the BBC had commissioned Power and Prodigy Pictures to produce a new version of the story; the drama was screened on 28 and 29 December 2009, starring Dougray Scott as Bill Masen, Joely Richardson as Jo Playton, Brian Cox as Dennis Masen, Vanessa Redgrave as Durrant, Eddie Izzard as Torrence, Jason Priestley as Coker, Jenn Murray as Susan, Ewen Bremner as Walter Strange, Shane Taylor as Osman, Troy Glasgow as Troy, Adam Sinclair as Ashdown, Lizzie Hopley as Hilda and Julia Joyce as Imogen. It was produced by Michael Preger, Stephen Smallwood and directed by Nick Copus (EastEnders, The 4400). The script was by Patrick Harbinson, who has also written episodes of the British dramas Soldier Soldier and Heartbeat, and the American series ER and Law & Order.

=== Filming locations ===
Cobstone Windmill at Ibstone, Buckinghamshire appears briefly as Masen approaches the village where he meets Susan and Imogen. Masen then descends Cobstone Hill into Turville where the scenes in which he meets Susan and Imogen were filmed. The two girls are seen living at the Bull & Butcher, the public house of the same name in Turville. Shirning, the house used by Bill Masen's father, is Groombridge Place near Tunbridge Wells in Kent. This location was earlier used in the 2005 production of Pride and Prejudice. The scenes based in a religious community were filmed at the Hospital of St Cross in Winchester. The scenes in a pub taken over by Coker and his team were filmed at The Cockpit, St Andrew's Hill, near St Paul's Cathedral, London.

== Home media ==
The series was released on DVD on 1 February 2010 in the United Kingdom. The Blu-ray Disc release followed on 22 February. It was shown in Canada on Showcase in February 2011 and subsequently released on DVD.
