= Simon Clark (novelist) =

British horror novelist

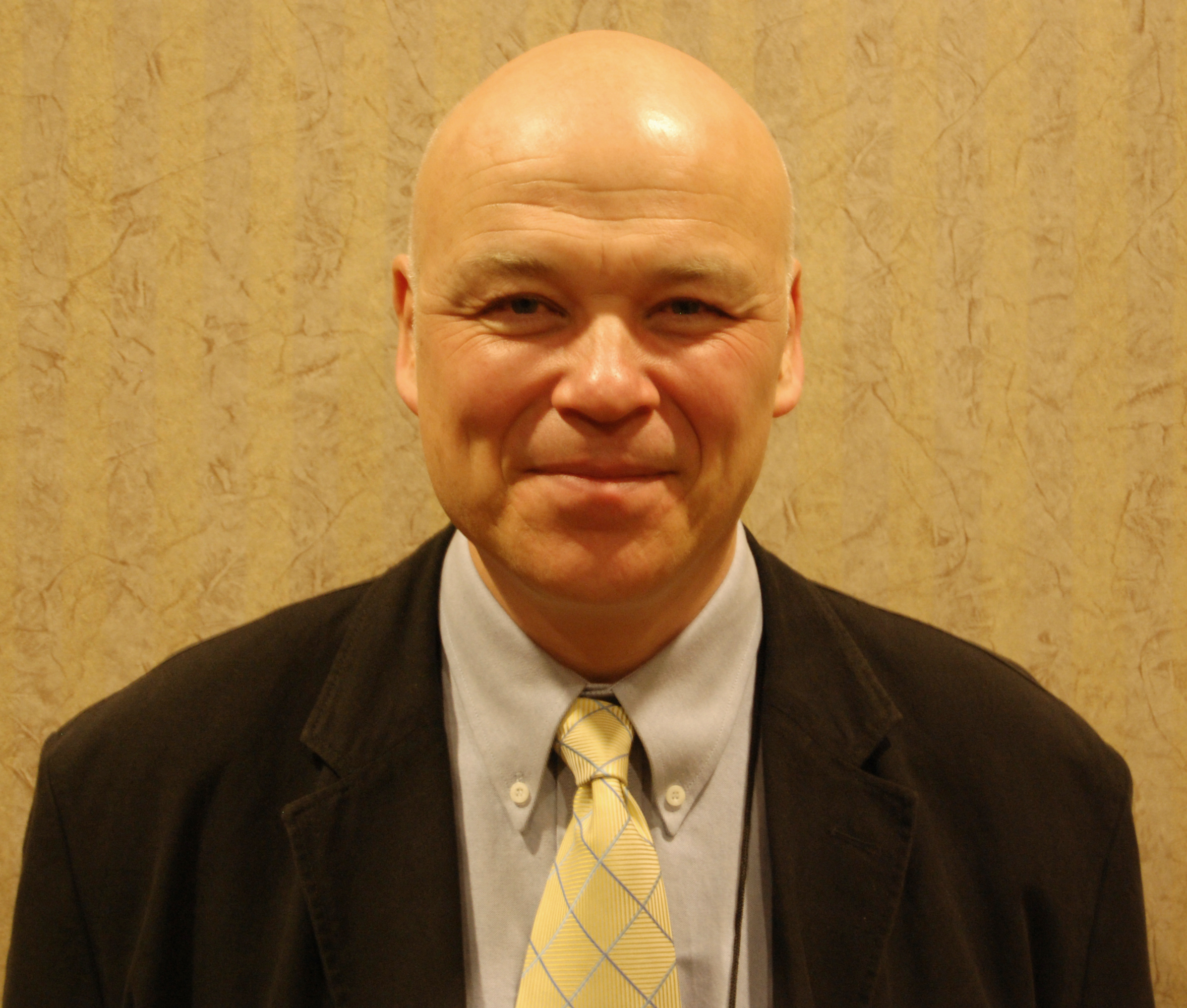
- Clark at the 2008 World Horror Convention in Salt Lake City, Utah
- Born: 20 April 1958 (age 68); Doncaster, England
- Writing career
- Genre: Horror novel
- Notable work: The Night of the Triffids

Simon Clark (born 20 April 1958) is a horror novelist from Doncaster, England. He is the author of the novel The Night of the Triffids, the novella Humpty's Bones, and the short story Goblin City Lights, which have all won awards.

Most of his stories are based in Yorkshire, his home county. He also uses a technique that he calls "The Art of Wandering". The idea for Goblin City Lights arose from wandering in a London graveyard. His other novels include Blood Crazy, recently extrapolated into a series, On Deadly Ground (Formerly King Blood), the Vampyrrhic series, Cold Legion and Sherlock Holmes: Lord Of Damnation.

== Biography ==
Simon Clark was born on 20 April 1958 in Doncaster, England. He is married and has two children.

Clark began his career writing stories for fanzines. One of these was the semiprozine Back Brain Recluse (BBR). His first published collection of stories was Blood And Grit, published by BBR in 1990. In 1994 an editor named Nick Austin at Hodder Headline bought both Nailed by the Heart and Blood Crazy. An agent agreed to represent Clark. At this point, Clark decided to become a full-time writer.

After his seventh novel had been published in England, the American publisher Leisure Books republished his first book, Nailed by the Heart. Clark's first book for the American market, Darkness Demands, was set in the small English village of Skelbrooke, South Yorkshire. Clark has also written prose material for U2 in the fan magazine Propaganda.

== Major works ==
=== Vampyrrhic novels ===
One of Clark's most popular novels, Vampyrrhic, has been followed by several sequels. Clark has said that he is not a fan of vampire novels. In the 1990s it was his view that vampires were becoming romantic, attractive figures. His intention in writing the book was to make the vampire loathsome, repellent, and ultra-violent again.

=== The Night of the Triffids ===
The Night of the Triffids is Clark's sequel to The Day of the Triffids by John Wyndham. His agent contacted the trustees of Wyndham's estate, who agreed to the proposal.

=== Doctor Who ===
Clark's Doctor Who novella, The Dalek Factor, was published by Telos Publishing just before the rights to publish Doctor Who were reacquired by the BBC. Around the same time, Clark was commissioned by the BBC to write a story for the second series of an animated Doctor Who series starring Richard E. Grant. This is the Doctor known as the Shalka Doctor. Three episodes were written before the commission was cancelled due to the imminent return of the live television series.

=== Blood Crazy Series ===
In August 2023, Clark signed a three-book deal with Darkness Visible Publishing, run by author Roger Keen, which inaugurated the Blood Crazy Series.

The first book is a republication of the original novel, first published by Hodder and Stoughton in 1995. It concerns nineteen-year-old Nick Aten, caught up in a maelstrom when the entire adult population becomes murderously unhinged and is driven to annihilate every young person below the age of twenty. The second book, Blood Crazy: Aten in Absentia, features a new community and their struggles with a mystery illness, together with the emergence of curious personality changes to the ‘Creosotes’ (the murderous adults), which pose unknown threats. The third book, Blood Crazy: Aten Present, sees the return of Nick and other favourite characters, who are caught up in a new apocalypse as the transformed adults wreak havoc on a greater scale.

Blood Crazy was republished in September 2023, Blood Crazy: Aten in Absentia is published in December 2023, and Blood Crazy: Aten Present will appear early in 2024.

== Awards ==
In 2001 Clark was selected as a Writer Guest of Honor at the World Horror Convention.

In 2002 he won the British Fantasy Award for best short story, "Goblin City Lights", and best novel for The Night of the Triffids. "Goblin City Lights" originally appeared in Urban Gothic: Lacuna and Other Trips (2001), published by Telos Publishing. Clark said that the story first started when he wandered into a London graveyard, which he cites in an article, "The Art of Wandering", as a good example of his technique.

In 2011 he won the British Fantasy Award for best novella for Humpty's Bones.

== Adaptations and other broadcasts ==
Clark's story "Six Men with Fire", a story about a picket-line during the UK miner's strike of 1984–1985 was read by Paul Copley on Morning Story on BBC Radio 4, on 27 July 1988.

A Big Finish Productions audio adaptation of The Night of the Triffids was released in September 2014. It stars Sam Troughton as David Masen.

== Bibliography ==
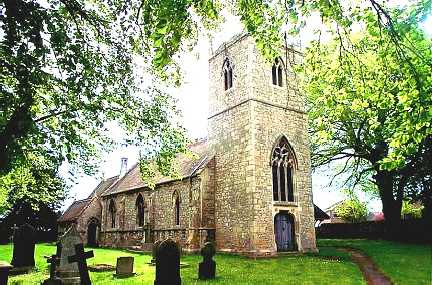
Churchyard at Skelbrooke

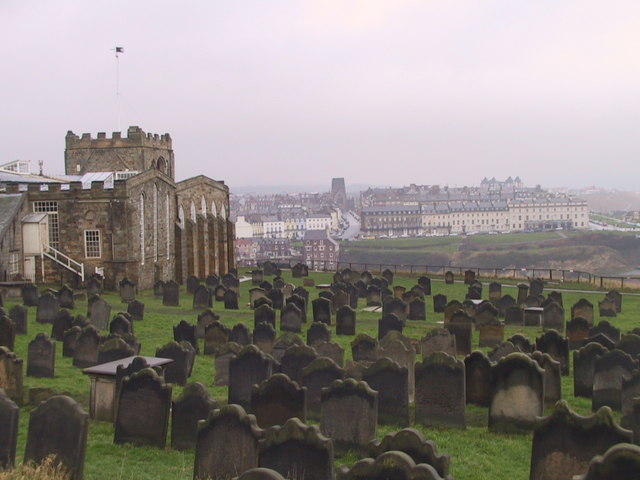
Graveyard in Whitby

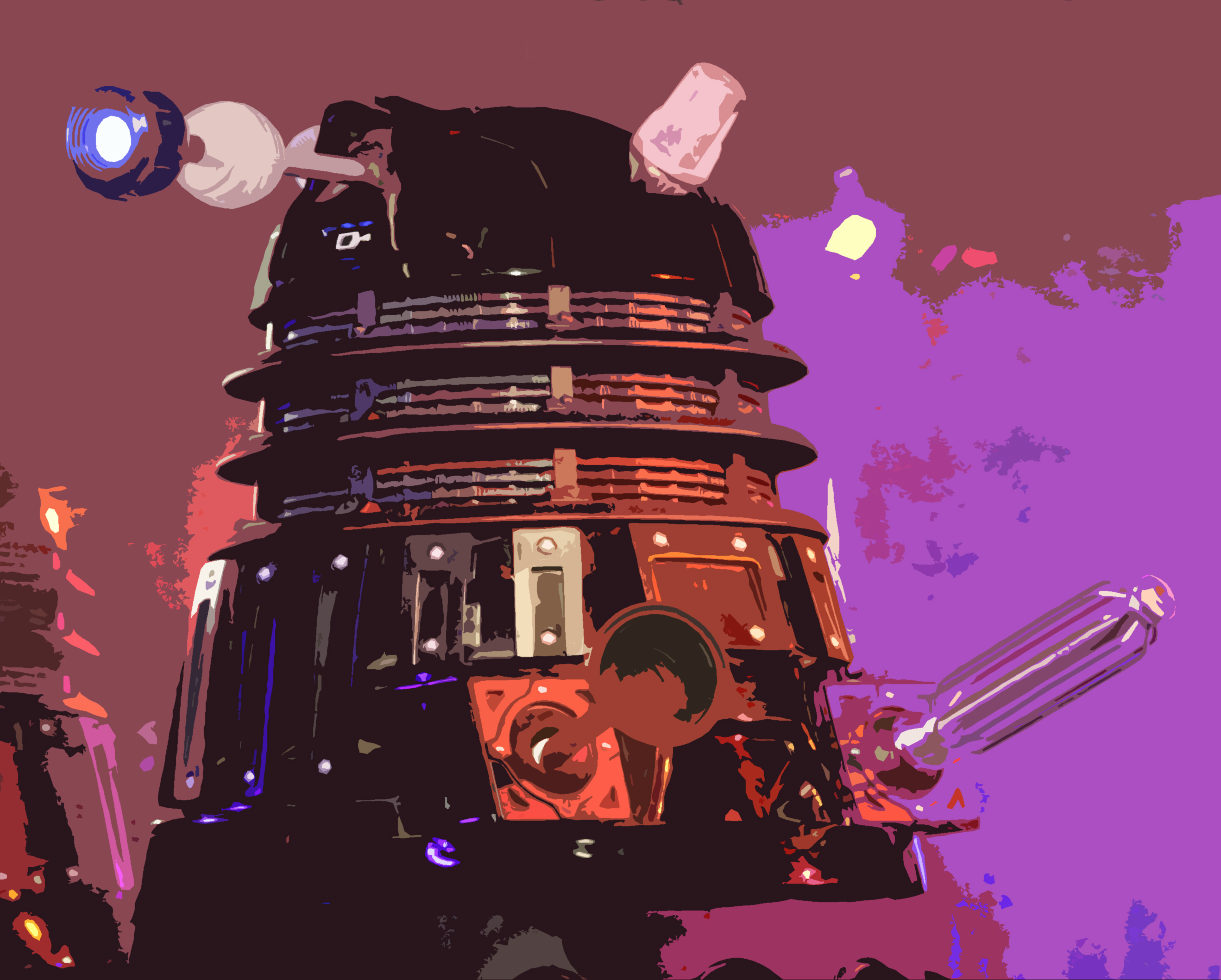
Dalek

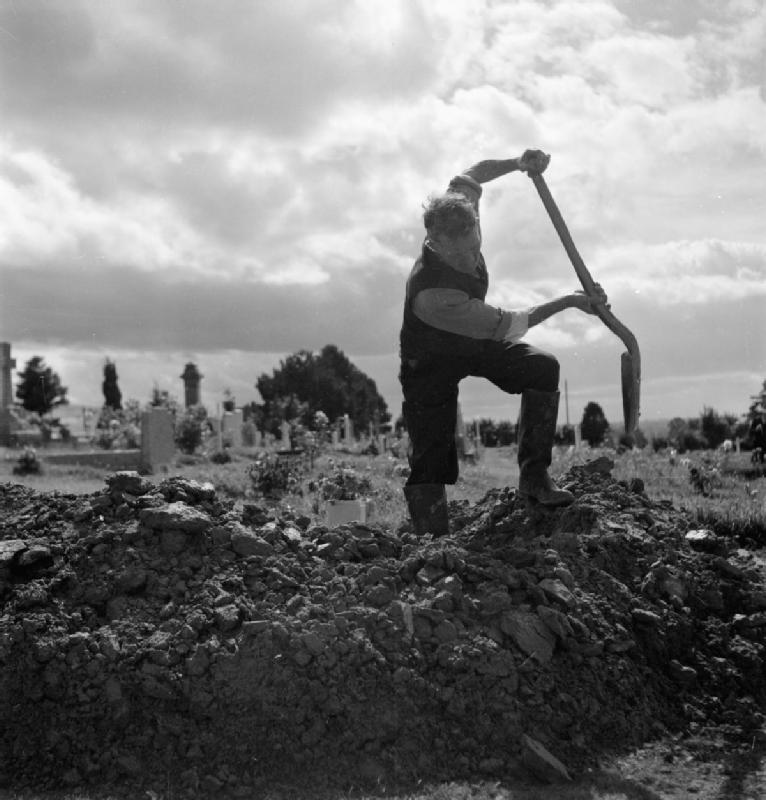
Gravedigger

=== Novels ===
- His Vampyrrhic Bride (2012) Severn House Publishers, ISBN 978-0-7278-8184-7
- Ghost Monster (2009) Leisure Books, ISBN 978-0-8439-6179-9
- Vengeance Child (2009) Severn House Publishers, ISBN 978-0-7278-6705-6
- Whitby Vampyrrhic (2009) Severn House Publishers, ISBN 978-0-7278-6831-2
- The Midnight Man (2008) Severn House Publishers, ISBN 978-1-84751-061-7
- Lucifer's Ark (2007) Severn House Publishers, ISBN 978-1-84751-039-6
- This Rage of Echoes (2007) Robert Hale Ltd, ISBN 978-0-7090-8533-1
- Death's Dominion (2006) Robert Hale Ltd, ISBN 978-0-7090-8189-0
- London Under Midnight (2006) Severn House Publishers, ISBN 978-0-7278-6398-0
- The Tower (2005) Robert Hale Ltd, ISBN 978-0-7090-8002-2
- In This Skin (2004) Robert Hale Ltd, ISBN 978-0-7090-7655-1
- Vampyrrhic Rites (2003) Hodder Headline, ISBN 978-0-340-81941-8
- Stranger (2002) Robert Hale Ltd, ISBN 978-0-7090-7224-9
- Darkness Demands (2001) Leisure Books, ISBN 978-0-8439-4898-1
- The Night of the Triffids (2001) Hodder Headline, ISBN 978-0-340-76601-9
- Judas Tree (1999) Hodder Headline, ISBN 978-0-340-73914-3
- The Fall (1998) Hodder Headline, ISBN 978-0-340-69611-8
- Vampyrrhic (1998) Hodder Headline, ISBN 978-0-340-69609-5
- King Blood (1997) Hodder Headline, ISBN 978-0-340-66062-1
- Darker (1996) Hodder Headline, ISBN 978-0-340-66060-7
- Blood Crazy (1995) Hodder Headline, reissued by Leisure Books, 2001, ISBN 978-0-8439-4825-7
- Nailed by the Heart (1995) Hodder Headline, reissued by Leisure Books, 2000, ISBN 978-0-8439-4713-7

=== Novellas ===
- Butterfly (2010) Cemetery Dance Publications, ISBN 978-1-58767-159-3
- Humpty's Bones (2010) Telos Publishing, ISBN 978-1-84583-859-1
- This Ghosting Tide (2009) Bad Moon Books, ISBN 978-0-9821546-2-5
- Stone Cold Calling (2008) Tasmaniac Publications, ISBN 978-0-9803868-4-4
- She Loves Monsters (2006) Necessary Evil Press, ISBN 978-0-9753635-4-6
- Doctor Who: The Dalek Factor (2004) Telos Publishing, ISBN 978-1-903889-30-5

=== Collections ===
- Blood and Grit 21 (2011) BBR Solutions Ltd ASIN B0060734AK
- The Gravedigger's Tale (2010) Robert Hale Ltd ISBN 978-0-7090-9119-6
- Midnight Bazaar – A Secret Arcade of Strange and Eerie Tales (2007) Robert Hale Ltd ISBN 978-0-7090-8344-3
- Hotel Midnight (2005) Robert Hale Ltd ISBN 978-0-7090-7819-7
- Salt Snake and Other Bloody Cuts (1999) Silver Salamander ASIN B000FNS0FO
- Blood & Grit (1990) BBR Books ISBN 978-1-872588-03-2

== Critical reactions ==
Reviewers at Publishers Weekly have given Clark's works mixed reviews. The reviewer of Darker said it was "disappointing" and hoped Clark would do better next time. The reviewer of Whitby Vampyrrhic called the novel a "cookie-cutter story of an English town infested by the undead".

However, His Vampyrrhic Bride was described as "romantic without being soppy or sentimental", and "a palate cleanser for horror readers tired of the same old blood-suckers". The Night of the Triffids was said to be "a crafty continuation" of The Day of the Triffids, being "more literary than many books of its ilk" and a "truly enjoyable voyage". The reviewer for Death's Dominion wrote that "all the monster-burning, skull-crushing, village-razing, castle-raiding fun ... make for a satisfying son of Frankenstein".
