= The Day of the Triffids =

1951 novel by John Wyndham

- First edition hardback cover
- Author: John Wyndham
- Language: English
- Genre: Science fiction, post-apocalyptic science fiction
- Publisher: Michael Joseph
- Publication date: December 1951
- Publication place: United Kingdom
- Media type: Print (hardback & paperback)
- Pages: 304 (first edition, hardback)
- ISBN: 0-7181-0093-X (first edition, hardback)
- OCLC: 152201380

The Day of the Triffids is a 1951 post-apocalyptic novel by the English science fiction author John Wyndham. After most people in the world are blinded by an apparent meteor shower, an aggressive species of plant starts killing people. Although Wyndham had already published other novels using other pen name combinations drawn from his real name, this was his first novel published as "John Wyndham".

The story has been made into the 1963 feature film of the same name, three radio drama series (in 1957, 1968 and 2001) and two television series (in 1981 and 2009). It was nominated for the International Fantasy Award in 1952, and in 2003 the novel was listed on the BBC's survey The Big Read. It is the inspiration for the 2002 film 28 Days Later. In 2021, the novel was one of six classic science fiction novels by British authors selected by the Royal Mail to feature in a series of UK postage stamps.

== Summary ==
External image
- Day of the Triffids postage stamp, 2021

The protagonist is Bill Masen, a biologist who has made his living working with triffids—tall, venomous, carnivorous plants capable of locomotion. Due to his background, Bill suspects they were bioengineered in the Soviet Union and accidentally released into the wild. Because of the excellent industrial quality of an oil produced by and obtained from the triffids, there is heavy triffid cultivation around the world.

The narrative begins with Bill in hospital, his eyes bandaged after having been splashed with triffid poison from a stinger. During his recovery he is told of an unexpected green meteor shower. The next morning, he learns that the light from the unusual display has rendered any who watched it blind. (Later in the book, Bill speculates that the "meteor shower" may have been orbiting satellite weapons, triggered accidentally.) After unbandaging his eyes he finds the hospital in chaos, with staff and patients without sight. He wanders through a chaotic London full of blind inhabitants and meets wealthy novelist Josella Playton, whom he rescues after discovering her being forcibly used as a guide by a blind man. Intrigued by a single light on top of the Senate House in an otherwise darkened city, Bill and Josella discover a group of sighted survivors led by a man named Beadley, who plans to establish a colony in the countryside. They decide to join the group.

The polygamy implicit in Beadley's scheme for rebuilding society appalls some group members, especially the religious Miss Durrant. However, before these plans can be put in place, a man named Wilfred Coker stages a fire at the university and kidnaps a number of sighted individuals, including Bill and Josella. They are each chained to a blind person and assigned to lead a squadron of the blind, collecting food and other supplies, all the while beset by escaped triffids and rival scavengers.

Soon Bill's followers begin to fall sick and die of an unknown disease. When he wakes one morning to find the survivors have left him, he returns to the Senate House to seek Josella, but his only lead is an address left behind by Beadley's group. Joined by a repentant Coker, Bill drives to the address, a country estate called Tynsham in Wiltshire. He finds part of the Beadley group, now led by Durrant, who eventually tells him that Beadley went to Dorset a few days before he arrived; there has been no sign of Josella. Bill and Coker decide to follow Beadley, finding small groups of blind and sighted people along the way. Eventually, they decide to separate, Coker returning to help at Tynsham, while Bill heads for the Sussex Downs after remembering a remark Josella made about friends she had there.

En route, Bill rescues a young sighted girl named Susan, whom he finds trapped alone at home, while her young brother lies dead in the garden, killed by a triffid. He buries the boy and takes Susan with him. A few days later, during a night of heavy rain, they see a faint light in the distance. Upon reaching it, they discover Josella and her friends.

The survivors attempt to establish a self-sufficient colony in Sussex with some success, but are constantly under threat from the triffids, which mass around the fenced exterior. Several years pass, until one day a representative of Beadley's faction lands a helicopter in their yard and reports that his group has established a colony on the Isle of Wight. Durrant's talk of Dorset was a deliberate attempt to throw Bill off on his journey to find Beadley. While Bill and the others are reluctant to leave their own settlement, the group decide to see the summer out in Sussex before moving to the Isle of Wight.

Their plans are hurried by the arrival of an armoured car of the militaristic representatives of a self-appointed, despotic government. Bill recognises the leader as a ruthless young man he had encountered on a scavenging expedition in London, whom he had watched cold-bloodedly kill one of his own group who had fallen ill. The latter plans to give Bill a large number of blind people for whom to care and use on the farm as slave labour; he will also take Susan as hostage. Feigning agreement, Bill's group throw a party, during which they encourage the visitors to get drunk. Creeping out of the house whilst the visitors are fast asleep, they disable the armoured car by pouring honey into the fuel tank and drive through the gates, leaving them open for the triffids to pour in. The novel ends with Bill's group on the Isle of Wight, determined one day to destroy the triffids and reclaim their world.

== Publication history ==
In the United States, Doubleday & Company holds the 1951 copyright. A condensed version of the book also was serialized in Collier's magazine in January and February 1951. An unabridged paperback edition was published in the late 1960s, in arrangement with Doubleday, under the Crest Book imprint of Fawcett Publications World Library.

== Influences ==
Wyndham frequently acknowledged the influence of H. G. Wells' The War of the Worlds (1897) on The Day of the Triffids— Wells's working title had been The Day of the Tripods.

The triffids are related, in some editions of the novel, to brief mention of the theories of the Soviet agronomist Trofim Lysenko, a proponent of Lamarckism who eventually was thoroughly debunked. "In the days when information was still exchanged Russia had reported some successes. Later, however, a cleavage of methods and views had caused biology there, under a man called Lysenko, to take a different course" (Chapter 2). Lysenkoism at the time of the novel's creation was still being defended by some prominent international Stalinists.

During the Blitz, Wyndham was a fire watcher and later member of the Home Guard. He witnessed the destruction of London from the rooftops of Bloomsbury. He described many scenes and incidents, including the uncanny silence of London on a Sunday morning after a heavy bombardment, in letters to his long-term partner Grace Wilson. These found their way into The Day of the Triffids.

== Critical reception ==
The book has been praised by other science fiction writers. Karl Edward Wagner cited The Day of the Triffids as one of the thirteen best science fiction horror novels. Arthur C. Clarke called it an "immortal story". Anthony Boucher and J. Francis McComas praised it, saying: "rarely have the details of [the] collapse been treated with such detailed plausibility and human immediacy, and never has the collapse been attributed to such an unusual and terrifying source". Forrest J Ackerman wrote in Astounding Science Fiction that Triffids "is extraordinarily well carried out, with the exception of a somewhat anticlimactic if perhaps inevitable conclusion".

Brian Aldiss coined the disparaging phrase cosy catastrophe to describe the subgenre of post-war apocalyptic fiction in which society is destroyed save for a handful of survivors, who are able to enjoy a relatively comfortable existence. He singled out The Day of the Triffids as an example and described Triffids as "totally devoid of ideas". However, some more recent critics have argued against this view. Margaret Atwood wrote: "one might as well call World War II—of which Wyndham was a veteran—a 'cozy' war because not everyone died in it".

John Clute commented that the book was regularly chosen for school syllabuses, as it was "safe". Robert M. Philmus called it derivative of better books by H. G. Wells. Groff Conklin, reviewing the novel's first publication, characterised it as "a good run-of-the-mill affair" and "pleasant reading ... provided you aren't out hunting science fiction masterpieces".

== Cultural impact ==
According to director Danny Boyle, the opening hospital sequence of The Day of the Triffids inspired Alex Garland to write the screenplay for 28 Days Later (2002).

The 2012 short story "How to Make a Triffid" by Kelly Lagor includes discussions of the possible genetic pathways that could be manipulated to engineer the triffids.

== Themes ==
=== Science and technology ===
The Day of the Triffids touches on mankind's advances in science and technology as a possible contributor to the collapse of society that is depicted in the novel.

I saw them now with a disgust that they had never roused in me before. Horrible alien things which some of us had somehow created, and which the rest of us, in our careless greed, had cultured all over the world, One could not even blame nature for them.

— Bill Masen, in The Day of the Triffids

In a master's thesis titled Social Critique in the Major Novels of John Wyndham: Civilization's Secrets and Nature's Truths, Michael Douglas Green writes about other scientific contributions to the novel's apocalypse:

The apocalypse in The Day of the Triffids is not merely a result of the creation of the triffids, however. It is instead, a sort of compound disaster; the triffids only gain free rein after another man-made horror—a satellite—goes awry. The narrator describes the advent of a sort of orbital missile (not utterly unlike an ICBM) developed in both the East and West carrying not only atomic weapons but also "such things as crop diseases, cattle diseases, radioactive dusts, viruses, and infections not only of familiar kinds, but brand-new sorts recently thought up in laboratories, all floating around up there."

— Social Critique in the Major Novels of John Wyndham: Civilization's Secrets and Nature's Truths, pp. 28–29

=== Post-World War II British politics ===
Critics have highlighted the parallels between the triffids and the decolonization that took place in Europe after 1945. In an essay titled "The Politics of Post-Apocalypse: Ideologies on Trial in John Wyndham's The Day of the Triffids", literary critic Jerry Määttä writes:

It could be argued that one of the reasons why John Wyndham's The Day of the Triffids reached such a vast audience is that it can be read as a symbolic negotiation of the British situation in the first few years after the Second World War. Elsewhere, I have also suggested that the curiously under-analysed triffids could be read as distorted metaphors for the colonised peoples of the British Empire—then in the middle of the process of decolonisation—coming back to haunt mainland Britain, much as the Martians did in H. G. Wells' The War of the Worlds (1898), one of Wyndham's main influences.

— The Politics of Post-Apocalypse: Ideologies on Trial in John Wyndham's The Day of the Triffids 13.2, "The Politics of Post-Apocalypse: Ideologies on Trial in John Wyndham's The Day of the Triffids"

Robert Yeates, in his essay "Gender and Ethnicity in Post-Apocalyptic Suburbia", proposes another connection to colonialism:

The title The Day of the Triffids shows a colonial role reversal of this kind in which humanity is no longer the most powerful species, and Masen remarks that it is "an unnatural thought that one type of creature should dominate perpetually."

— "Gender and Ethnicity in Post-Apocalyptic Suburbia", p. 112

At the time of the novel's writing there was an emerging welfare state in Great Britain after the formation of the Attlee ministry. Coker's forced shackling of sighted people to the blind echoes the sentiments that some middle-class British citizens felt in the wake of the changes introduced by the Labour party after their 1945 election victory.

=== Loss of identity ===
The novel frequently brings into question the utility of individualism during the apocalypse. Colin Manlove highlights this phenomenon in his essay "Everything Slipping Away: John Wyndham's The Day of the Triffids":

Simultaneous with this process, people lose their identities. Part of this comes from the fact that all now exist in a shared situation, the catastrophe: no longer can one be an agronomist, a doctor, a farmer, a novelist, but only one more individual up against the triffids, one only real distinction being if one is sighted.

== Adaptations ==
=== Film adaptations ===
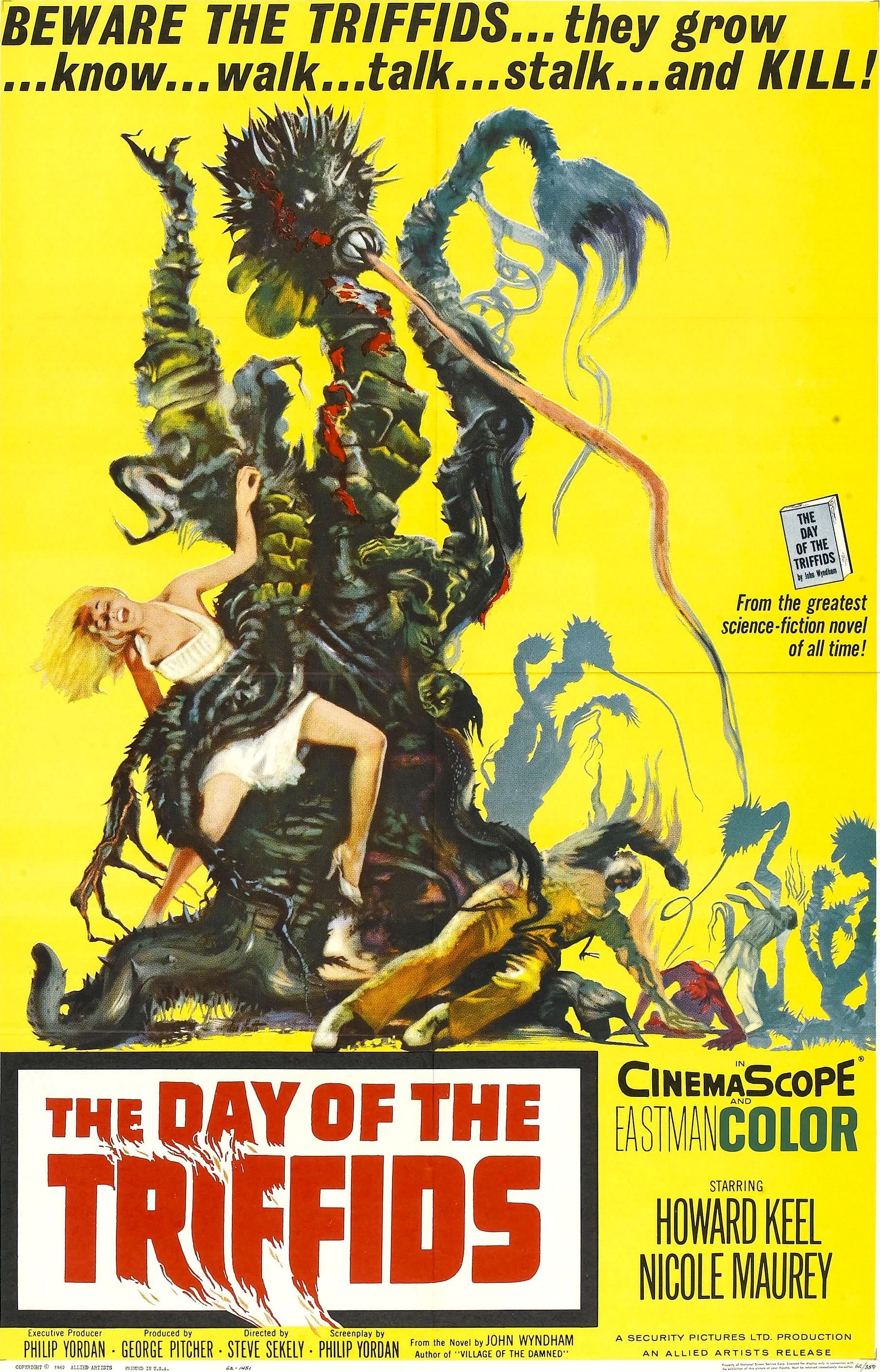
The Day of the Triffids film poster (1962)

- London-based film producers Albert R. Broccoli and Irving Allen purchased the film rights and in 1956 hired Jimmy Sangster to write the script. Sangster believed that Wyndham was one of the best science fiction novelists writing at the time and felt both honoured and "a little bit intimidated" that he was about to "start messing" with Wyndham's novel. Sangster claims he was paid for his work, but never heard from the producers and the film was not made. He later said that he did not think that his script was good.
- A British cinematic version, directed by Steve Sekely, with a screenplay by Bernard Gordon, was filmed on location in Spain and released in July 1962. Not in agreement with the novel, it suggested that the triffids arrived on Earth via spores from the meteor shower.
- In September 2010, Variety announced that a 3-D film version was being planned by producers Don Murphy and Michael Preger.
- The anime film Crayon Shin-chan: My Moving Story! Cactus Large Attack! (2015) had a similar setting with Triffids replaced by killer cacti.

=== Stage adaptations ===
- A stage adaptation directed by Jay James-Moody premiered at the New Theatre in Sydney, Australia in July 2026.

=== Game adaptations ===
- Prázdninová škola Lipnice, a non-profit organisation that pioneered experiential education summer camps in Czechoslovakia in the 1980s, developed an outdoor game based on the story.
- The Italian version of the 1983 Advanced Dungeons & Dragons "Shambling Mound" Fantasy Adventure Figure by TSR, Inc. named the creature Il Trifido dinoccolato "The slouching Triffid."
- An article in issue 53 of the magazine Dragon, released in 1981, contains mechanics for triffids as monsters in Advanced Dungeons & Dragons 1st edition. The article is titled "Ways of the Triffids, The" and was written by Mark Nulver.

=== Print adaptations ===
- Marvel Comics adapted the story in the magazine Unknown Worlds of Science Fiction (1975).

=== Radio adaptations ===
Character	1957	1968	2001
Bill Masen	Patrick Barr	Gary Watson	Jamie Glover
Josella Playton	Monica Grey	Barbara Shelley	Tracy-Ann Oberman
Coker	Malcolm Hayes	Peter Sallis	Lee Ingleby
Col. Jacques	Arthur Young	Anthony Vicars	Geoffrey Whitehead
Michael Beadley	John Sharplin	Michael McClain	
Ms. Durrant	Molly Lumley	Hilda Krisemon	Richenda Carey
Dr. Vorless	Duncan McIntyre	Victor Lucas	
Susan	Gabrielle Blunt	Jill Cary	Lucy Tricket
Denis Brent	Richard Martin	David Brierly	
Mary Brent	Shelia Manahan	Freda Dowie	
Joyce Tailor	Margot Macalister	Margaret Robinson	
Torrence	Trevor Martin	Hayden Jones	

- There were readings of the novel in 1953 (BBC Home Service – 15 × 15 minutes, read by Frank Duncan)
- Giles Cooper adapted the novel in six 30-minute episodes for the BBC Light Programme, first broadcast between 2 October and 6 November 1957. It was produced by Peter Watts.
- A second version of Cooper's adaptation, for BBC Radio 4, was first broadcast between 20 June and 25 July 1968. It was produced by John Powell, with music by David Cain of the BBC Radiophonic Workshop.
- It was adapted in Germany in 1968 by Westdeutscher Rundfunk (WDR) Köln (Cologne), translated by Hein Bruehl. Most recently, it was re-broadcast as a four-episode series on WDR5 in January 2008.
- It was adapted in Norway in 1969 by Norsk Rikskringkasting (NRK), translated by Knut Johansen, and most recently re-broadcast as a six-episode series on NRK in September and October 2012. The Norwegian version is also available on CD and iTunes.
- There were readings of the novel in 1971 (BBC Radio 4 – 10 × 15 minutes, read by Gabriel Woolf)
- A 20-minute extract for schools was first broadcast on BBC Radio 4 on 21 September 1973, adapted and produced by Peter Fozzard.
- There were readings of the novel in 1980 (BBC Radio 4/Woman's Hour – 14 × 15 minutes, read by David Ashford)
- An adaptation by Lance Dann in two 45-minute episodes for the BBC World Service was first broadcast on 8 and 22 September 2001. It was directed by Rosalind Ward, with music by Simon Russell. Episode 2 was originally scheduled for 15 September 2001, but was rescheduled due to the September 11 attacks. Each episode was followed by a 15-minute documentary on the book.
- There were readings of the novel in 2004 (BBC Radio 7 – 17 × 30 minutes, read by Roger May)

=== Television adaptations ===
- A six-episode (each episode 30 minutes in length) television serial version was produced by the BBC in 1981 and repeated first on UKGold in the early 1990s (as 3x50 minute episodes, as it was edited for international sales) then on BBC Four in 2006, 2007, 2009 and 2014. It starred John Duttine as Bill Masen and was fairly faithful to the novel, albeit moving the timeline to a then-contemporary setting, with Triffid oil being farmed as an energy-saving fuel additive.
- In December 2009, the BBC broadcast a new version of the story, written by ER and Law & Order writer Patrick Harbinson. It stars Dougray Scott as Bill Masen, Joely Richardson as Jo Playton, Brian Cox as Dennis Masen, Vanessa Redgrave as Durrant, Eddie Izzard as Torrence and Jason Priestley as Coker. An estimated 6.1 million people viewed the first episode. In this version the Triffids originally evolved in Zaire, and their oil is used as an alternative fuel, averting global warming. The elements of repopulating the Earth and the plague were overlooked in this adaptation; another difference in the plot was that the Earth was blinded by a solar flare rather than a meteor shower.
- Amazon Studios announced a planned television series adaptation of the novel with Johan Renck set to direct and executive produce for Angry Films.

== Sequels ==
Simon Clark wrote a sequel The Night of the Triffids (2001). This is set 25 years after Wyndham's book, and focuses on the adventures of Bill Masen's son David, who travels to New York. Big Finish Productions adapted it as an audio play in 2014. The dramatisation featuring Sam Troughton was later broadcast on BBC Radio 4 Extra in June 2016.

Simon Gould published The Land of the Triffids in 2016, continuing the story of Christina Schofield, picking up where Simon Clark's The Night of the Triffids left off. However, as of 2023, the book is unavailable for purchase and has not been dramatised in any form.

In 2020, English science fiction and fantasy author John Whitbourn published a sequel, titled The Age of the Triffids. Set in the Isle of Wight "Colony" in the lead-up to the Millennium, it details the rallying of survivors from across Britain for one last attempt to defeat the triffid threat. For copyright reasons, the book is not for sale outside Canada and New Zealand.
