= The Night of the Triffids =

2001 novel by Simon Clark

- Cover of first edition (hardcover)
- Author: Simon Clark
- Language: English
- Genre: Science fiction
- Publisher: Hodder & Stoughton
- Publication date: 2001
- Publication place: United Kingdom
- Media type: Print (Hardcover & Paperback)
- Pages: 406
- ISBN: 0-340-76600-X
- OCLC: 45327422
- Preceded by: The Day of the Triffids

The Night of the Triffids is a science fiction novel by British writer Simon Clark, published in 2001. It is a sequel to John Wyndham's 1951 novel The Day of the Triffids. Clark has been commended for his success at mimicking Wyndham's style, but most reviewers have not rated his creation as highly as the original work. Clark's book is written in the first person and narrated by David Masen, the son of Wyndham's protagonist.

== Plot summary ==
The story begins on the Isle of Wight, 25 years after the events from The Day of the Triffids. The community there has thrived, primarily by refining triffid oil into fuel.

One morning, a solar blackout occurs and triffids once again besiege the island. Pilot David Masen (son of Bill and Josella Masen from The Day of the Triffids) takes to the skies to investigate the cause of the blackout; however, even after taking his plane into the atmosphere as high as it can go, he finds that there is no end to the absolute darkness.

On David's descent, he loses communication with the control tower and is forced to make a crash landing on a floating island populated by triffids. There, he meets an orphaned young girl, Christina, who has been surviving on her own in the wild since she was a young child, primarily because she is immune to triffid stings. The pair are rescued by an American ship that takes them to Manhattan Island in New York City.

Manhattan, a secure and self-contained community like the one on the Isle of Wight, appears at first glance to be a utopia seemingly untouched by the triffid catastrophe. David quickly falls in love with his tour guide, Kerris Baedekker, who is one of the hundreds of daughters of General Fielding, the primary ruler of the city. David divulges to General Fielding that the Isle of Wight has a considerable fleet of aircraft, which, using triffid oil for fuel, can fly much farther than the Manhattan fleet, which runs on wood alcohol.

Just before David is set to return home to the Isle of Wight, he is kidnapped by a rebel group known as the Forresters. However, David ends up siding with them when they reveal that Fielding is actually a terrible dictator named Torrence, an old enemy of David's father, and that he keeps Manhattan prosperous by using the black and blind citizens as slaves, unbeknownst to the rest of the population. The Forresters further reveal that Torrence is planning to attack the Isle of Wight in order to steal their triffid oil refining machinery and that he intends to create a race of soldiers immune to triffid poison by harvesting Christina's ovaries and implanting them into all the viable women in Manhattan.

In order to rescue Christina and Kerris from Torrence's headquarters in the Empire State Building, the Forresters unleash thousands of triffids into the city, some as gigantic as sixty feet tall. Unfortunately, Torrence and his guards manage to fend off the attacks and capture David and his group. However, Torrence is defeated when thousands of slaves arrive, released from their slave camps during the triffid attack, and persuade the soldiers to turn on the dictator.

At the end of the story, the great blackout is revealed to have been caused by interstellar dust blotting out the Sun. However, humanity continues to survive. Up to 25 percent of the population is immune to triffid stings, due to repeated exposure to small amounts of the plant's poison when consuming triffids for food.

== Literary significance and criticism ==
Comments on The Night of the Triffids include:

"Clark scores fairly high in pastiching Wyndham's style, at least."
"Wyndham did hit notes of poetry and grim beauty more often than Clark does"
"Overall, The Night of the Triffids is a fine work of fiction that will keep any sci-fi/horror fan happy"
"It fails, however, in its main aim, that of supplying a worthy follow-up to one of the classics of British science fiction."

== Awards ==
The Night of the Triffids won the August Derleth Award in 2002.

== Adaptations ==
On June 19, 2014 Big Finish Productions announced an audio drama adaptation of The Night of the Triffids, released in September 2014. Big Finish's production was broadcast on BBC Radio 4 Extra on June 29, 2016.

== Sources ==
- Clark, Simon (October 2001). The Night of the Triffids (1st ed.). London: Hodder & Stoughton. ISBN 0-340-76600-X.
