= The Day of the Triffids (1981 TV series) =

1981 British television drama series

- Title card
- Genre: Science fiction drama
- Based on: The Day of the Triffids by John Wyndham
- Written by: Douglas Livingstone
- Directed by: Ken Hannam
- Starring: John Duttine; Emma Relph; Maurice Colbourne; Stephen Yardley; Gary Olsen
- Country of origin: United Kingdom
- No. of episodes: 6

Production
- Producer: David Maloney
- Running time: 26 minutes (per episode)

Original release
- Network: BBC One
- Release: 10 September – 15 October 1981

The Day of the Triffids is a British science fiction drama serial which was first aired by BBC Television in 1981. An adaptation by Douglas Livingstone of the 1951 novel by John Wyndham, the six half-hour episodes were produced by David Maloney and directed by Ken Hannam, with original music by Christopher Gunning.

== Plot ==
In late 20th century Great Britain, a spectacular meteor shower unexpectedly renders most of humanity blind, leading to the collapse of society overnight. Unaware of this, Bill Masen (John Duttine) has retained his sight due to being in hospital with his eyes bandaged at the time of the shower. Bill works on a triffid farm, where the mobile and carnivorous plants are cultivated for their oil with their deadly stings retained, which improves the oil quality. Prior to the story, Bill was stung by a plant and even though he was wearing protective clothing, some of the poison got into his eyes. In the hospital he tentatively removes the bandages and gradually discovers the catastrophe around him.

Bill rescues Josella "Jo" Playton (Emma Relph) from her blind captor and learns that she was asleep during the meteorite shower and thus kept her sight. They encounter a small band of sighted survivors who have decided to leave London and establish a community elsewhere to begin rebuilding civilisation. They are initially opposed by sighted Jack Coker (Maurice Colbourne), who wants them to stay in London and help the blind, not abandon them. When the others reject his scheme, he and a few sighted helpers capture some of the group, including Bill and Jo. He assigns each to a different group of the blind. Bill is handcuffed to two of his charges to prevent him leaving them.

The triffids get loose and run amok amongst the helpless blind population, slaughtering and feeding on them. Between the triffids and a mysterious deadly disease, most of Bill's group eventually die; the rest scatter. Bill starts searching for Jo and teams up with Coker, who admits his plan did not work as he had hoped. They drive through the English countryside and encounter part of the group that had left London. The group had split after a disagreement over morality: the ones who stayed behind, led by Miss Durrant (Perlita Neilson), refused to accept that polygamy was necessary to repopulate the world. After more fruitless searching, Coker decides to return to Miss Durrant's community.

Bill meets a young sighted girl, Susan, and she accompanies him. Finally, he recalls that Jo had spoken of a place belonging to her friends in the Sussex Downs. There he is reunited with her and after erecting a protective fence around the farm to keep out the triffids, they settle down and start raising a family. Six years pass, and one day Coker shows up in a helicopter. Miss Durrant's group had been wiped out by the disease but the other faction had secured the Isle of Wight and exterminated the local triffid population. With the situation gradually deteriorating where they are, Bill, Jo and the blind friends who own the farm, as well as the children, prepare to join them.

Before they can leave, several uniformed men arrive in an armoured car the next day; they are part of an organisation that is setting up a feudal society, with the sighted as the new aristocracy. In their setup, one sighted person is in charge of ten of the blind. They plan to assign more blind people to Bill and Jo, and take Susan away to learn how to care for others. Bill gets the soldiers drunk and sabotages their armoured vehicle. Early the next morning, Bill and the rest of the group make their escape and drive away, leaving the gates open for the besieging triffids as they approach the soldiers.

== Cast ==
=== Major characters ===
- John Duttine as Bill Masen
- Emma Relph as Josella Payton
- Maurice Colbourne as Jack Coker

=== Minor characters ===
- Stephen Yardley as John
- Gary Olsen as Torrence
- Lorna Charles as Susan (teenaged)
- Emily Dean as Susan (young)

== Production ==
=== The Triffid plants ===
A triffid was operated by a man crouched inside, cooled by a fan installed in its neck; the 'clackers' were radio controlled. The gnarled bole, based on the ginseng root, was made of latex with a covering of sawdust and string while the neck was fibreglass and continued down to the floor, where it joined with the operator's seat. The plant was surmounted by a flexible rubber head, coated with clear gunge.

After the end of the production, one was displayed for a while in the Natural History Museum in London; they were designed by Steve Drewett who worked there. Copies of the props later were fellow guests at a cocktail party with Angus Deayton during an episode of Alexei Sayle's Stuff (see "External Links" below).

=== Filming locations ===
Some of the locations used in the series, such as the University of London's Senate House, corresponded to those specified in the book. Many of the locations used during filming can be located by studying the street names and other signs which appear in the show. For example, Jo's family home appears to be 2 Heath Side, which is adjacent to Hampstead Heath in London NW3. Jo's car breaks down at the junction of Remington Street and Nelson Place in Islington in episode 2, and Jo and Bill first meet yards away from that location in a stairwell on the Theseus Estate, before running along Theseus Walk in episode 3.

== Critical reception ==
The British Film Institute's Screenonline wrote, "This remains a compelling and understated thriller. As with the same year's classic The Nightmare Man (BBC), it represents serious and unsentimental science fiction with John Duttine, in particular, excelling as the battling and bewildered protagonist, struggling to survive in a blind, brutal world. Critic David Pringle termed the original novel 'a very enjoyable catastrophe', and to the production team's credit the same can be said of this involving and intelligent adaptation."

== Home media ==
The series was released on DVD in the UK on 4 April 2005 and in Australia on 6 June 2005. A US DVD (through BBC Home Video) was released on 1 October 2007. A Blu-ray of the series was released on 7 September 2020 in the UK.

== Broadcast ==
The series was repeated on BBC1 (7 March 1984 – 11 April 1984), Satellite channel UK Gold screened the series in 1996, 2004 and 2005 and the Sci-Fi channel broadcast the series in 2006. BBC Four has also screened the series in 2006, 2009 and 2014.

ABC Television co-funded the production, showing it in May 1982 as three 50-minute episodes then repeating it in 1983 as a single movie-length transmission and again in 1987 in the 50-minute format.

During 2014 it was streaming in the US on Hulu, but as of 2024, it is now on the streaming service Pluto TV.

The series was shown in New Zealand in the 1980s on TVNZ.
