= Lu Ann Simms discography =

- Studio albums: 1
- EPs: 2
- Compilation albums: 2
- Singles: 30

Lu Ann Simms (July 11, 1932 – September 21, 2003) was an American singer. She was signed to and released pop 45s on Columbia Records between 1952 and 1957, Jubilee Records between 1957 and 1960 (in addition to her sole LP), Top Rank Records in 1960, Vee-Jay Records in 1963, and Wand Records in 1965. She also released a handful of children's records on Columbia Records between 1953 and 1955. Her recordings were licensed by such record labels as Philips Records and Coronet Records for release outside the United States.

Simms also managed the music publishing estate of her late first husband, Loring Buzzell, which included the firms Calyork Music, Inc., Colby Music, Ltd., and Hecht-Lancaster & Buzzell Music, Inc., the last of which she initially renamed Hecht & Buzzell Music, Inc. (after the departure of partner Burt Lancaster), and then later in 1965 to Colby Music, Inc.

== Pop releases ==
=== Albums ===
Title	Orchestra/Backing band credit	Release date	Record label	Ref.
At Separate Tables	Dave Terry and His Orchestra	January 1959	Jubilee Records (JLP 1092)	

=== Singles ===
A-Side	B-Side	Orchestra/Backing band credit	Release date	Record label	Ref.
"When It's Just About September"	"Puppy Love"	Percy Faith and His Orchestra	August 1952	Columbia Records (39841)	
"Red Is for Roses"	"It's the End of the Line"	Percy Faith and His Orchestra	October 1952	Columbia Records (39890)	
"The Best Time"	"Moving Away"	Percy Faith and His Orchestra	January 1953	Columbia Records (39928)	
"I Wouldn't Want It Any Other Way"	"Hand-Me-Down Heart"	Percy Faith and His Orchestra	May 1953	Columbia Records (39991)	
"I Won't Be Home No More"	"You Could Be My Love"	Percy Faith and His Orchestra	September 1953	Columbia Records (40084)	
"For Now and Always"	"Be Patient, My Darling"	Percy Faith and His Orchestra	September 1953	Columbia Records (40087)	
"The Best Time"	"Moving Away"	Percy Faith and His Orchestra	September 1953	Philips Records (B 21013 H)	
"Baubles, Bangles and Beads"	"Fini"	Percy Faith and His Orchestra	November 1953	Columbia Records (40127)	
"I Won't Be Home No More"	"You Could Be My Love"	Percy Faith and His Orchestra	January 1954	Philips Records (B 21135 H)	
"For Now and Always"	"Be Patient, My Darling"	Percy Faith and His Orchestra	January 1954	Philips Records (B 21137 H)	
"Junior Prom"	"Bing! Bang! Boom!"	Percy Faith and His Orchestra	April 1954	Columbia Records (40216)	
"Junior Prom"	"Bing! Bang! Boom!"	Percy Faith and His Orchestra	July 1954	Philips Records (B 21306 H)	
"Boy Wanted"	"You Can't Measure My Love"	Percy Faith and His Orchestra	September 1954	Columbia Records (40297)	
"I Wanna Hug You, Kiss You, Squeeze You"	"I Might Drop Around in Your Dreams"		January 1955	Columbia Records (40430)	
"Red Roses and Little White Lies"	"Convicted"		November 1955	Columbia Records (40606)	
"Red Roses and Little White Lies"	"Convicted"		November 1955	Philips Records (B 21810 H)	
"Nosey"	"Love Me As Though There Were No Tomorrow"	Percy Faith and His Orchestra	February 1956	Columbia Records (40659)	
"Hi-Lili, Hi-Lo"	"Golden Roses and Silver Bells"	David Terry and His Orchestra	August 1956	Columbia Records (40748)	
"The Same Two Lips"	"Matchin' Kisses"	Jimmy Carroll and His Orchestra	March 1957	Columbia Records (40855)	
"The Same Two Lips"	"Matchin' Kisses"	Jimmy Carroll and His Orchestra	May 1957	Coronet Records (KS/KP 137)	
"Run, Don't Walk"	"The Still Small Voice"	Jimmy Carroll and His Orchestra	June 1957	Columbia Records (40937)	
"The Cha-Lypso"	"I Remember Marcellino"	Ray Martin	October 1957	Jubilee Records (5302)	
"The Cha-Lypso"	"I Remember Marcellino"	Ray Martin	December 1957	Reo Records (8196X)	
"The Mooch"	"Bye Um Bye"		March 1958	Jubilee Records (5321)	
"Harbor Lights"	"Felipé"	David Terry and His Orchestra	July 1958	Jubilee Records (5335)	
"The Mooch"	"Bye Um Bye"		August 1958	Prestige Records (PSP 1125)	
"Image of You"	"Blue Jay"	Billy Mure	March 1959	Jubilee Records (5370)	
"Maybe"	"Do I Really Love You"	Billy Mure	June 1959	Jubilee Records (5373)	
"After"	"Just About"		February 1960	Jubilee Records (5383)	
"Mark My Words"	"One Boy, Two Girls"	Milton DeLugg	May 1960	Top Rank International (RA 2046)	
"Treat Him Nicely"	"Promise Me Anything (But Give Me Love)"		July 1963	Vee-Jay Records (547)	
"If It's Gonna Happen"	"After the Party"		July 1965	Wand Records (196)	

=== Extended plays ===
A-Side	B-Side	Orchestra/Backing Band Credit	Release date	Record label	Ref.
"Junior Prom" / "Puppy Love"	"Moving Away" / "The Best Time"	Percy Faith and His Orchestra	1954	Columbia Records (B 1860)	
"Separate Tables" / "There Will Never Be Another You"	"You're Getting to Be a Habit with Me" / "Oh That Kiss"	Dave Terry and His Orchestra	October 1958	Jubilee Records (1092)	

=== Compilations albums ===
Title	Release date	Record label	Ref.
Now and Always	April 22, 2008	Flare Records (ROYCD 272)	
The Columbia Records Anthology (1952–1957)	February 8, 2019	Columbia Records	

=== Various artist compilations ===
Release title	Song title	Orchestra/Backing band credit	Release date	Record label	Ref.
Arthur Godfrey's TV Calendar Show	"Rockaway Beach"	Archie Bleyer	March 1953	Columbia Records (CL 521)	
Christmas with Arthur Godfrey and All the Little Godfreys	"Here Comes Santa Claus (Down Santa Claus Lane)"	Archie Bleyer	October 1953	Columbia Records (CL 540 / B 348 / C 348)	
A Visit to New York with Arthur Godfrey and All the Little Godfreys	"Sunday in the Park"	Will Roland	April 1955	Columbia Records (CL 653 / B 500)	
Godfrey and His Friends	"Boy Wanted"	Percy Faith and His Orchestra	1956	Columbia Records (CL 2514)	
Kismet	"Baubles, Bangles and Beads"	Percy Faith and His Orchestra	January 1956	Philips Records (429091 BE)	
American Vocal Parade I	"Moving Away"	Percy Faith and His Orchestra	March 1956	Philips Records (B 07642 R)	
American Vocal Parade III	"The Best Time"	Percy Faith and His Orchestra	March 1956	Philips Records (B 07644 R)	
Nightclub Visit	"Be Patient, My Darling"	Percy Faith and His Orchestra	March 1956	Philips Records (B 07718 R)	
StereoSonic Vocal Sampler	"Separate Tables" / "You'll Never Know"	Dave Terry and His Orchestra	May 1959	Jubilee Records (SSJLP 802)	
Jubilee Surprise Party Vol. 1	"There Will Never Be Another You"	Dave Terry and His Orchestra	May 1959	Jubilee Records (SDJLP 1107)	
How to Stuff a Wild Bikini	"If It's Gonna Happen"		July 1965	Wand Records (WD 671)	

== Junior releases ==
This section documents releases that were made for children.

=== Singles ===
A-Side	B-Side	Orchestra/Backing band credit	Release date	Record label	Ref.
"The Little Rag Doll (With the Shoe Button Eyes)"	"Sandy, The Sandman"	Percy Faith and His Orchestra	August 1953	Columbia Records (J 169)	
"I Dreamt That I Was Santa Claus"	"I Just Can't Wait 'Til Christmas"	Percy Faith and His Orchestra	September 1953	Columbia Records (J 170 / 40089)	
"The Little Rag Doll (With the Shoe Button Eyes)"	"Sandy, The Sandman"	Percy Faith and His Orchestra	December 1953	Philips Records (B 21138 H)	
"I Dreamt That I Was Santa Claus"	"I Just Can't Wait 'Til Christmas"	Percy Faith and His Orchestra	December 1953	Philips Records (B 21143 H)	
"Happy Little Island"	"Cat 'N Mouse"	Percy Faith and His Orchestra	January 1954	Columbia Records (J 188)	
"Dance of the Candy Dolls"	"The 'Who Is It?' Song"	Percy Faith and His Orchestra	April 1954	Columbia Records (J 190)	
"Happy Little Island"	"Cat 'N Mouse"	Percy Faith and His Orchestra	November 1954	Philips Records (B 21420 H)	
"La La Lu"	"The Siamese Cat Song"	Mitch Miller and His Orchestra	March 1955	Columbia Records (J 226 / 40467)	
"La La Lu"	"The Siamese Cat Song"	Mitch Miller and His Orchestra	1957	Coronet Records (KK 021)	

=== Compilations ===
Release title	Song title	Orchestra/Backing band credit	Release date	Record label	Ref.
A First Christmas Record For Children	"I Just Can't Wait 'Til Christmas"	Percy Faith and His Orchestra	October 1957	Columbia Records (CL 1027)	
Songs About Cats and Dogs	"Cat 'N Mouse" / "The Siamese Cat Song"	Percy Faith and His Orchestra / Mitch Miller and His Orchestra	June 1958	Columbia Records (CL 1142)	

== Featured or guest releases ==
This section documents releases for which Simms provided backing vocals.

=== Albums ===
Main artist/Band credit	Release title	Song title	Release date	Record label	Ref.
Disco Tex and His Sex-O-Lettes	Disco Tex & The Sex-O-Lettes Review	"Around the World"	March 1975	Chelsea Records (CHL 505)	
Nancy Nevins	Nancy Nevins		May 1975	Tom Cat Records (BYL 1 1063)	
The Bob Crewe Generation	Street Talk		November 1976	Elektra Records (7E 1083)	
The Eleventh Hour	Hollywood Hot		March 1976	20th Century Records (T 511)	

=== Singles ===
Main Artist/Band credit	Song title	Release date	Record label	Ref.
King Guion and the Double Rhythm Orchestra	"Pagan Love Song"	November 1952	Coral Records (60891)	
The Bob Crewe Generation	"Street Talk"	February 1976	20th Century Records (TC 2271)	
The Bob Crewe Generation	"Street Talk"	February 1976	Philips Records (6162 072)	
