= Hecht-Lancaster & Buzzell Music =

American music publishing company

- Industry: Music
- Founded: January 1955
- Founder: Burt Lancaster; Harold Hecht; Loring Buzzell
- Defunct: 1960
- Headquarters: 729 7th Avenue, New York, New York, United States
- Key people: Lu Ann Simms
- Products: Music Publishing
- Parent: Norma Productions; Cromwell Music; Colby Music
- Divisions: Leigh Music; Hecht-Lancaster & Buzzell Music; Calyork Music; Colby Music; Calyork Records; Maine Records; Hecht & Buzzell Music

Hecht-Lancaster & Buzzell Music, Inc. (sometimes referred to as Hecht-Lancaster-Buzzell Music Publishing, and later known as Hecht & Buzzell Music, Inc. and Colby Music, Inc.) was an American music publishing company founded by film producer Harold Hecht, his brother-in-law Loring Buzzell, and Hecht's business partner, actor/producer Burt Lancaster.

Hecht-Lancaster & Buzzell Music was solely associated with the American Society of Composers, Authors and Publishers (ASCAP). The three partners also founded the music publishing company Calyork Music, Inc. (sometimes referred to as Calyork Music Corporation or Calyork Music Publishing), which was solely associated with Broadcast Music, Inc. (BMI).

Hecht, Lancaster, and Buzzell also briefly operated their own record labels, Calyork Records and Maine Records, which were active in the late 1950s. Hecht-Lancaster & Buzzell Music, Calyork Music, Calyork Records, and Maine Records were divisions of Hecht and Lancaster's film production corporation Norma Productions.

Compositions published by Hecht-Lancaster & Buzzell Music and Calyork Music have been recorded by dozens of artists and have in turn been released by such record labels as Columbia Records, Warner Bros. Records, MGM Records, ABC-Paramount Records, Capitol Records, London Records, United Artists Records, Decca Records, Mercury Records, RCA Victor Records, Jubilee Records, Coral Records, Top Rank Records, Date Records, Kapp Records, Apollo Records, Everest Records and Cabot Records; as well as their own imprints Calyork Records and Maine Records.

== History ==
=== Origin, Cromwell Music association, and Leigh Music ===
Following World War II, Hollywood's Golden Age started to fade. After a 1948 ruling that major studios could no longer own theater houses and thereby monopolize production, distribution, and exhibition, things changed greatly. More room was awarded to independent producers, and fewer relied on long-term deals with major studios. Talent agent Harold Hecht and actor Burt Lancaster formed Norma Productions, a film production company, in the summer of 1947. But income in the movie business box office, although far from poor, continued to dwindle, because of stiff competition from radio and television. By the mid-1950s most households owned a television, and the producers who could afford it started producing shows for that market. A similar situation was happening in the music business, as most households owned at least one phonograph. All the major studios either bought out existing record labels or started their own. The studios also began exploiting the soundtrack album, which had before then mostly been an M-G-M musical fad, but caught on with all types of films in the mid-1950s.

In January 1955, Hecht-Lancaster Productions, by then the leading independent film production unit in Hollywood, announced that it was extending its operations into music publishing, entering into a partnership with Howie Richmond's Cromwell Music, Inc. company. The contacts were made through Loring Bruce Buzzell, Hecht's brother-in-law (the brother of his first wife, Gloria Joyce Buzzell), who worked for Richmond at Cromwell Music. Loring and Gloria's father, Samuel Jesse Buzzell, had been a music patent attorney, and their uncle, Edward Buzzell, was a successful film director. Both Hecht and Buzzell had worked for Irving Mills' Mills Music, Inc. company earlier in their careers. Buzzell was also a field man for the American Society of Composers, Authors and Publishers (ASCAP) and in July 1954 married singer Lu Ann Simms (née Lu Ann Ciminelli), who got her big break performing on the Arthur Godfrey show and had since then released a series of successful singles through Columbia Records.

Hecht-Lancaster Productions first published the music from their film Marty in April and June 1955 through Cromwell Music. This gave way for a series of interpretations by various artists of Marty's theme song. Hecht-Lancaster Productions' next film soundtrack, The Kentuckian, composed by Bernard Herrmann, was published through Frank Loesser's publishing company, Frank Music, Inc. It is unknown what kind of deal Hecht and Lancaster worked out with Frank Loesser, or if Herrmann had a publishing deal directly with Loesser.

In June 1956, it was announced that Hecht, Lancaster, and Buzzell had formed their own music publishing company, Leigh Music, Inc., which would be co-publishing music from their 1956 film Trapeze with Cromwell Music. The name of the company was based on Buzzell's daughter Cynthia Leigh Buzzell (Hecht and Lancaster frequently named their companies after their children). On July 6, 1956, the title song, Trapeze, was co-published through Cromwell Music and Leigh Music. By the second song co-published, Lola's Theme, on August 24, 1956, Leigh Music had been renamed Hecht-Lancaster & Buzzell Music, Inc. The new company was listed under the same address as Cromwell Music: 151 West 46th Street, New York City. Lola's Theme also received various interpretations and singles.

In mid-July 1956, the Hollywood-based Record Releasing Corporation approached Hecht-Lancaster Productions regarding a music deal, though no information surfaced as to future plans.

=== Hecht-Lancaster & Buzzell Music and Calyork Music publishing companies ===
The new company remained silent for the next six months, until a press announcement was made in March 1957. By then, Hecht-Lancaster Productions had made James Hill a full partner in the company and changed its name to Hecht-Hill-Lancaster Productions, which was a subsidiary of Norma Productions, but Hill was not included in the music venture. The announcement revealed that Harold Hecht, Loring Buzzell and Burt Lancaster had formed a publishing company with plans to publish the scores of Hecht-Hill-Lancaster Productions films and non-film-related pop music.

Two separate publishing firms were announced in the March 1957 press release. Hecht-Lancaster & Buzzell Music, Inc. was to be solely associated with ASCAP, while Calyork Music, Inc. was to work exclusively with BMI (Calyork Music's CAE/IPI number is 4901911). The name Calyork was a combination of California, where Hecht and Lancaster were based, and New York, where Buzzell was based and where Hecht and Lancaster were originally from. The partners intended to alter between the companies for each release, starting with the soundtrack to Hecht-Hill-Lancaster Productions' The Bachelor Party through Hecht-Lancaster & Buzzell, and then the soundtrack to Sweet Smell of Success through Calyork. Both Hecht-Lancaster & Buzzell Music and Calyork Music were under the umbrella of Norma Productions.

In the summer of 1957, Howie Richmond announced that he was interested in acquiring overseas distribution of the Hecht-Lancaster & Buzzell soundtracks.

=== Notable releases and success ===
The soundtrack to Hecht-Lancaster Productions' film Trapeze was released by Columbia Records in June 1956 (catalog CL 870), to a degree of success. But it was the film's and soundtrack LP's theme song, Lola's Theme, that became a radio favorite. It spanned three successful singles interpreted by different bands; in June 1956 Columbia Records released a Muir Mathieson Orchestra version featuring Lola's Theme on the A-side and Mike and Lola's Love Theme on the B-side (catalog Columbia 40725). This was followed in July by a Coral Records release of Steve Allen's version featuring Lola's Theme on the A-side and Conversation (on the Telephone) on the B-side (catalog Coral 61681). Later that same month, a third single was released by Mercury Records of Ralph Marterie and His Orchestra's version featuring Lola's Theme on the A-side and Yes Sir, That's My Baby on the B-side (catalog Mercury 70197).

Hecht-Lancaster & Buzzell Music and Calyork Music went on to publish songs for every future Norma Productions (and its subsidiary companies) films. Their films include The Bachelor Party and Sweet Smell of Success in 1957, Run Silent, Run Deep and Separate Tables (which was nominated for an Academy Award for Best Music, Scoring of a Dramatic or Comedy Picture) in 1958, Cry Tough, The Rabbit Trap, Take a Giant Step and Summer of the Seventeenth Doll in 1959 and finally, The Unforgiven in 1960.

It is now practically impossible to know all of the various interpretations of songs copyrighted and published by Hecht-Lancaster & Buzzell Music and Calyork Music, as some may only have been performed live with no documentation, others may have been recorded but not released, while others may have been recorded and released but did not chart. However, most of the movie soundtracks have been well discussed, even in negative criticism. The company's first official single, the theme song from The Bachelor Party, was composed and performed by Alex North but was not successful. Theme Song from The Bachelor Party appeared on the B-side of an RCA Victor Records 7" showcasing Alex North's theme for Playhouse 90 on the A-side (catalog Victor 6896).

The company's second offering, which featured music from Sweet Smell of Success, was extremely well received and was also of significant importance in the soundtrack category. Sweet Smell of Success marked the first time that a film had two different soundtracks, each featuring completely different music. Thus, Sweet Smell of Success spanned two soundtrack LPs and two promotional singles. The first soundtrack LP was released in July 1957 by Decca Records (catalog DL 8610) and featured the jazz score composed by Elmer Bernstein. That same month, the lead single was released by Decca Records with the songs The Street and Toots Shor's Blues (catalog Decca 30379). The second soundtrack LP featured music composed and performed by the Chico Hamilton Quintet, who also appeared in the film. Decca Records released this LP in August 1957 (catalog DL 8614) and promoted it with a single by Mark Murphy featuring Goodbye Baby on the A-side and The Right Kind of Woman on the B-side (catalog Decca 30390).

In October 1958 the Clifton Productions film (a subsidiary of Norma Productions) Separate Tables yielded three singles of its theme song. The first was performed by Vic Damone, released by Columbia Records (catalog Columbia 41287); the second was by Eydie Gormé, released by ABC-Paramount Records (catalog ABC 9971); and the third was by Lu Ann Simms, released by Jubilee Records (catalog Jubilee 1092). The Columbia Records single became Damone's best-selling record.

Hecht-Lancaster & Buzzell Music's most significant song was May You Always, composed by Dick Charles and Larry Markes in the fall of 1958. It was first recorded by the McGuire Sisters, who were friends of Lu Ann Simms and had worked with her on the Arthur Godfrey show and attended Simms and Buzzell's wedding. The version recorded by the McGuire Sisters, released by Coral Records (catalog Coral 62059), peaked at number 11 on Billboard's Hot 100 chart on January 26, 1959, and became the best-selling record of 1959; the song also became the second-best-selling sheet music in the United States and a top ten in Britain. Other artists who have recorded the song include Vince Hill and Ken Dodd, both for EMI, The Kays for Gala Records, Barbara Cook for DRG Records, John Warren, Joe "Mr Piano" Henderson and The Jean-Ettes, all for Pye Records, Maureen Evans for Embassy Records, Carol Williams for Melcot Music, Anita Bryant for Columbia Records, Tammy Jones and Bobby Vinton, both for Epic Records, Page Morton for M-G-M Records, Dave Garroway and Sandy Stewart for Dick Charles Recording, Harry Harrison for Amy Records, The Gatlin Brother for Branson Entertainment, Eddy Arnold for RCA-Victor Records, Ian McNabb for This Way Up, The Mills Brothers for Dot Records, Johnny Gilbert for Janel Records, Deep River Boys for Fontana Records, Jack Scott for Jade Records, and Dorothy Squires for Esban Records.

The theme song from The Unforgiven, titled "The Unforgiven – The Need for Love", was composed by Dimitri Tiomkin with lyrics by Ned Washington and was very successful with many recordings by popular artists in the early 1960s. It was recorded by Don Costa, Tito Rodríguez and Roy Liberto, all three for United Artists Records, The McGuire Sisters for Coral Records, Clyde Otis for Mercury Records, Ronnie Hilton and Gloria Lasso, both for His Master's Voice, The Wally Stott Orchestra And Chorus for Pye Records, Ron Goodwin and His Orchestra for Parlophone Records, Jackie Gleason for Capitol Records, Earl Bostic and Leon Pops Orchestra, both for King Records, Franck Pourcel for Pathé, Robert Jeantal and Michel Clement, both for Philips Records, François Deguelt, Max Jaffa and Norrie Paramor, both for Columbia Records, Helmut Zacharias for Polydor Records, The Clebanoff Strings for Mercury Records, Petula Clark for Disques Vogue, Frank Chacksfield for Ace of Clubs Records, Lew Douglas for Carlton Records, The Medallion Strings for Medallion Records, Jesse Crawford for Decca Records, and Gino Mescoli for Vesuvius Records.

Hecht-Lancaster & Buzzell Music also had fruitful collaboration with songwriters Kenny Jacobson and Rhoda Roberts, from whom they published and copyrighted over thirty songs. Some of these included "Just for Two" and "Somebody Loses, Somebody Wins", both recorded by Jaye P. Morgan for M-G-M Records, "Run, Don't Walk", "The Mooch" and "Bye Um Bye", all three recorded by Lu Ann Simms for Columbia Records and Jubilee Records, "Baby, Je Vous Aime", "Crazy Dreamer", "That's All That Matters" and "The Wonder of It All", all four recorded by Bobby Miller for Jubilee Records and Apollo Records, "Midnight Blue" and "This Could Be the Night", both recorded by Herb Corey for Top Rank Records, "Easy Does It", recorded by Johnny Mathis for Columbia Records, "I'll Be Waitin'", recorded by Kenny Rankin for Decca Records, "Didja Mean Whatcha Said?", recorded by Steve Karmen for Mercury Records, "Made for Each Other", recorded by Don Rondo for Jubilee Records, "Lovable", recorded by Jill Corey for Columbia Records, "Have Another", recorded by Lou Monte for RCA-Victor Records, "Bye Um Bye" recorded by Margaret Imlau for Decca Records, "This Could be the Night", recorded by The Arena Twins for Kapp Records, and "Cafe of Blue Mirrors" and "Ragamuffin's Holiday", both recorded by Ken Colby for Maine Records.

=== Calyork Records and Maine Records ===
Little documentation has been found about Calyork Records and Maine Records, two record labels that Hecht, Lancaster and Buzzell operated together. Most independent record labels of the era pressed records in extremely limited quantities and were only sent to radio disk jockeys and magazine representatives, in the hope of creating enough buzz to secure a major record label re-release for the outing. In most cases, the independent record labels of the era used their releases as portfolios or demos to shop to the major record labels. As such, few copies of Calyork Records or Maine Records releases have survived.

The only known release by Calyork Records is from 1958; the two songs featured on the disk were published on April 15, 1958. The 45 RPM 7" vinyl credits Calyork Records with the two songs published to Calyork Music as a Lou Bartel Production (songwriter and producer). It features the songs Anxiously Waiting and She Flipped Me performed by doo wop band The Flipteens. The record also indicates that it is a "Promotion Record" and a "Sample Copy Not For Sale". The address of the record label listed 729 7th Avenue, New York City as its headquarters, which was where the Hecht-Lancaster & Buzzell Music offices were then located, having moved out of Howard S. Richmond's office at 151 West 46th Street in New York City. The record was manufactured by United Artists Records, which had a pressing plant in the same building as the Hecht-Lancaster & Buzzell companies.

The only known release by Maine Records, also known as Maine Record Company, is from 1959. Maine Records was named after the State of Maine, where Buzzell had gone to university (he also named another company, Colby Music, after his alma mater). In March 1959, Maine Records released a 45 RPM 7" vinyl by Ken Colby featuring the songs Cafe of Blue Mirrors and Ragamuffin's Holiday, two songs already published by Hecht-Lancaster & Buzzell Music. The record was manufactured and distributed by Jubilee Records.

=== Colby Music and overseas licensing ===
Buzzell, Hecht and Lancaster initially had to work out a licensing deal for their published songs to be legally available outside the United States and collect royalties for their songwriters. Buzzell worked out a tie-up deal with Howard S. Richmond's British-based subsidiary Essex Music, Ltd. Records and sheet music released in the United Kingdom were listed as from Essex Music, Ltd. Ultimately, Hecht, Lancaster and Buzzell founded their own British imprint, Colby Music, Ltd. The name of the company came from Buzzell's alma mater Colby University. Colby Music was also extended to several other European countries, which were each represented by local firms. In Germany, Colby Music was represented by Julian Aberbach, while in Sweden the Scandinavian rights were licensed to Multitone Musikförlag by its New York representative Claes Dahlgren.

=== Demise ===
Calyork Music's final known registry is listed on September 23, 1958, with three Steve Karmen songs. Although the copyrights and royalty collections remained active, no new works were published under that company, with Hecht-Lancaster & Buzzell Music taking on all new publishing. The Hecht and Lancaster Companies started having interpersonal issues in early 1959, resulting in an announced hiatus from the film business in April 1959. In July 1959 Harold Hecht and Gloria Buzzell separated. This may have caused friction between Hecht and the Buzzell family. Both of these factors played against Hecht-Lancaster & Buzzell Music.

On October 20, 1959, Loring Buzzell suffered a fatal heart attack. Following this, few additional songs were published by Hecht-Lancaster & Buzzell Music. The exceptions include the theme songs for the Hecht-Hill-Lancaster Productions film Summer of the Seventeenth Doll and four songs co-written by widowed Lu Ann Simms and family friend Jaye P. Morgan. The final material published by the firm was Dimitri Tiomkin's soundtrack of the Hecht-Hill-Lancaster Productions film The Unforgiven, which was filled under the modified company name Hecht & Buzzell Music, Inc., as the film production company had dissolved by then and the three partners had gone their separate ways. Hecht & Buzzell Music was managed by Harold Hecht and Lu Ann Simms.

Simms took over the publishing companies following her husband's death and continued after Hecht's exit. By 1961, Calyork Music and Hecht & Buzzell Music's addresses were listed as 119 West 57th Street, New York City, which was Irvin Feld's business address, who also administered other notable music publishing firms like Desilu Music Corp. Calyork Music remained intact through BMI and continued to be administered by Feld. Hecht & Buzzell Music was however renamed, yet again, around 1965, this time to Colby Music, Inc., which made it easier to relate the company its existing British and European venture Colby Music, Ltd. Colby Music's address was listed care of Samuel Jesse Buzzell (Loring's father), 460 Park Avenue, New York. A deal was made with Richmond's Essex Music, Inc. to administer Colby Music, Inc. Many of the songs that had been previously recorded were re-issued on discs with updated publishing credits to Colby Music, which continues to administer the songs through ASCAP.

== Published works ==
This list was compiled from the Catalog of Copyright Entries, Music from 1955 to 1960. It is believed to be incomplete.

- Composer legend: a = arrangement, l = lyrics, m = music, w = words

Date	Song	Composer	Catalog number	Publisher	Associated Film
April 21, 1955	Hey, Marty	Harry Warren (m) & Paddy Chayefsky (w)	EP89219	Cromwell Music	Marty
June 10, 1955	Saturday Night Mambo	Roy Webb (m)	EP90516	Cromwell Music	Marty
June 29, 1956	Lola's Theme	Malcolm Arnold (m)	EU442973	Cromwell Music	Trapeze
June 29, 1956	Mike and Lola's Love Theme	Malcolm Arnold (m)	EU442974	Cromwell Music	Trapeze
July 6, 1956	Trapeze	Paul Elie (m) & Johnny Burke (l)	EP100758	Cromwell Music / Leigh Music	Trapeze
August 24, 1956	Lola's Theme	Malcolm Arnold (w, a) & Al Stillman (l)	EP101709	Cromwell Music / Hecht-Lancaster & Buzzell Music	Trapeze
April 1, 1957	Ragamuffin's Holiday	Kenny Jacobson (m)	EU472529	Hecht-Lancaster & Buzzell Music	
April 1, 1957	While the City Sleeps	Kenny Jacobson (m)	EU472528	Hecht-Lancaster & Buzzell Music	
April 3, 1957	Cheek to Chico	Chico Hamilton (m) & Fred Katz (m)	EU476352	Calyork Music	Sweet Smell of Success
April 3, 1957	Goodbye Baby	Chico Hamilton (m) & Fred Katz (m)	EU476352	Calyork Music	Sweet Smell of Success
April 3, 1957	Sidney's Theme	Chico Hamilton (m) & Fred Katz (m)	EU476351	Calyork Music	Sweet Smell of Success
April 26, 1957	Run, Don't Walk	Kenny Jacobson (m) & Rhoda Roberts (w)	EU475523	Hecht-Lancaster & Buzzell Music	
May 3, 1957	The Forest and the Sea	Kenny Jacobson (m, w)	EU476246	Hecht-Lancaster & Buzzell Music	
May 10, 1957	Green Silk Pajamas	Joe Marsala (w) & Guy Wood (m)	EU477347	Hecht-Lancaster & Buzzell Music	
May 22, 1957	No Place to Rest	Kenny Jacobson (m) & Rhoda Roberts (w)	EU478793	Hecht-Lancaster & Buzzell Music	
May 22, 1957	If I Were the Judge and the Jury	Don Marsh (m, w)	EU478773	Calyork Music	
May 31, 1957	Theme from The Bachelor Party	Alex North (m)	EP109947	Hecht-Lancaster & Buzzell Music	The Bachelor Party
July 3, 1957	Goodbye Baby	Chico Hamilton (m) & Fred Katz (m) & William Engvick (l)	EP110121	Calyork Music	Sweet Smell of Success
July 5, 1957	The Street	Elmer Bernstein (m)	EU484174	Calyork Music	Sweet Smell of Success
July 5, 1957	Tangerine Peel	Elmer Bernstein (m)	EU484173	Calyork Music	Sweet Smell of Success
July 5, 1957	Toots Shor's Blues	Elmer Bernstein (m)	EU484172	Calyork Music	Sweet Smell of Success
July 5, 1957	Tropical Island Mood	Elmer Bernstein (m)	EU484171	Calyork Music	Sweet Smell of Success
July 29, 1957	I'll Be Waitin'	Kenny Jacobson (m) & Rhoda Roberts (w)	EU486778	Hecht-Lancaster & Buzzell Music	
July 31, 1957	Crazy Dreamer	Kenny Jacobson (m) & Rhoda Roberts (w)	EU487130	Hecht-Lancaster & Buzzell Music	
August 6, 1957	My Haunted House	Kenny Jacobson (m) & Rhoda Roberts (w)	EU487896	Hecht-Lancaster & Buzzell Music	
August 6, 1957	Puppet on a String	Kenny Jacobson (m) & Rhoda Roberts (w)	EU487895	Hecht-Lancaster & Buzzell Music	
September 9, 1957	Who Can I Believe	Vance Packard (m, w)	EU492147	Calyork Music	
September 18, 1957	Didja Mean Whatcha Said?	Kenny Jacobson (m) & Rhoda Roberts (w)	EU493353	Hecht-Lancaster & Buzzell Music	
October 16, 1957	Run Silent, Run Deep	Kenny Jacobson (m)	EU496941	Hecht-Lancaster & Buzzell Music	Run Silent, Run Deep
October 24, 1957	Made for Each Other	Kenny Jacobson (m) & Rhoda Roberts (w)	EU497986	Hecht-Lancaster & Buzzell Music	
November 8, 1957	Dark Hazard	Anthony Tamburello (m)	EU499877	Calyork Music	
November 8, 1957	Goblin's Gavotte	Anthony Tamburello (m)	EU499875	Calyork Music	
November 8, 1957	Lady of Fashion	Anthony Tamburello (m)	EU499876	Calyork Music	
November 8, 1957	Mama's Song	Anthony Tamburello (m) & Marianina Miraglis (m)	EU499874	Calyork Music	
November 8, 1957	March Forth	Anthony Tamburello (m)	EU499878	Calyork Music	
November 8, 1957	Naughty Nautical	Anthony Tamburello (m)	EU499879	Calyork Music	
November 8, 1957	Theme for Radio	Anthony Tamburello (m)	EU499880	Calyork Music	
November 12, 1957	Darts	Fred Elton (m, w)	EU500258	Hecht-Lancaster & Buzzell Music	
November 19, 1957	So This Is How It Ends	Kenny Jacobson (m) & Rhoda Roberts (w)	EU501184	Hecht-Lancaster & Buzzell Music	
November 19, 1957	Cross Country Tour	Anthony Tamburello (m)	EU501117	Calyork Music	
November 19, 1957	'Sembly	Anthony Tamburello (m)	EU501115	Calyork Music	
November 19, 1957	So This Is Love	Anthony Tamburello (m)	EU501116	Calyork Music	
November 19, 1957	Waltz for Jane	Anthony Tamburello (m)	EU501118	Calyork Music	
November 22, 1957	You're the Prettiest Thing	Jane Douglas White (m) & Sydney Shaw (w)	EU501545	Hecht-Lancaster & Buzzell Music	
November 22, 1957	Post and Horn Gallop	Anthony Tamburello (m)	EU501554	Calyork Music	
November 22, 1957	Roundelay	Anthony Tamburello (m)	EU501555	Calyork Music	
December 18, 1957	That's All That Matters	Kenny Jacobson (m) & Rhoda Roberts (w)	EU504584	Hecht-Lancaster & Buzzell Music	
December 18, 1957	The Wonder of It All	Kenny Jacobson (m) & Rhoda Roberts (w)	EU504584	Hecht-Lancaster & Buzzell Music	
February 12, 1958	I Don't Want to Do a Thing but Love You	Jane Douglas White (m) & Sydney Shaw (w)	EU511228	Calyork Music	
February 12, 1958	Whispering Campaign	Jane Douglas White (m) & Sydney Shaw (w)	EU511227	Calyork Music	
February 17, 1958	Made for Each Other	Kenny Jacobson (m) & Rhoda Roberts (w)	EP116677	Hecht-Lancaster & Buzzell Music	
March 20, 1958	Now, Down to Earth	Kenny Jacobson (m) & Rhoda Roberts (w)	EU515896	Hecht-Lancaster & Buzzell Music	
March 21, 1958	Bye Um Byee	Kenny Jacobson (m) & Rhoda Roberts (w)	EU516234	Hecht-Lancaster & Buzzell Music	
March 21, 1958	The Mooch	Kenny Jacobson (m) & Rhoda Roberts (w)	EU516236	Hecht-Lancaster & Buzzell Music	
March 21, 1958	Lovable	Kenny Jacobson (m) & Rhoda Roberts (w)	EU516235	Hecht-Lancaster & Buzzell Music	
April 4, 1958	Be on the Lookout	Jane Douglas White (m) & Sydney Shaw (w)	EU517932	Calyork Music	
April 4, 1958	Time Will Tell	Jane Douglas White (m) & Sydney Shaw (w)	EU517931	Calyork Music	
April 15, 1958	Anxiously Waiting	Lou Bartel (m, w)	EU519508	Calyork Music	
April 15, 1958	She Flipped Me	Lou Bartel (m, w)	EU519507	Calyork Music	
April 23, 1958	Chum-Bam-Bele	Fred Elton (m, w) & Clint Ballard Jr. (m, w)	EU521044	Calyork Music	
April 24, 1958	Separate Tables	Harry Warren (m) & Harold Adamson (w)	EU521155	Hecht-Lancaster & Buzzell Music	Separate Tables
April 29, 1958	Easy Does It	Kenny Jacobson (m) & Rhoda Roberts (w)	EU521783	Hecht-Lancaster & Buzzell Music	
May 7, 1958	Ring Around the Moon	Don Marsh (m, w)	EU523275	Hecht-Lancaster & Buzzell Music	
May 9, 1958	Baby, Je Vous Aime	Kenny Jacobson (m) & Rhoda Roberts (w)	EU523617	Hecht-Lancaster & Buzzell Music	
June 4, 1958	Jackanapes	Anthony Tamburello (m)	EU527764	Calyork Music	
June 6, 1958	Just About	Don Marsh (m, w) & Nancy Lee Marsh (m, w)	EU528079	Calyork Music	
June 10, 1958	Green Jeans	Kenny Bowers (m, w)	EU528485	Calyork Music	
June 10, 1958	Help!	Kenny Bowers (m, w)	EU528486	Calyork Music	
June 12, 1958	Valse Viennese	Anthony Tamburello (m)	EU529893	Calyork Music	
July 1, 1958	Someone Else's Ring	Steve Karmen (m, w)	EU531431	Calyork Music	
July 1, 1958	Zoom Zoom	Steve Karmen (m, w)	EU531432	Calyork Music	
July 18, 1958	Foolishly Young	Horace Linsley (m, w)	EU533818	Hecht-Lancaster & Buzzell Music	
August 15, 1958	Run Silent, Run Deep	Kenny Jacobson (m)	EP121980	Hecht-Lancaster & Buzzell Music	Run Silent, Run Deep
September 19, 1958	Good Time Charlie	Fred Elton (m, w)	EU542450	Hecht-Lancaster & Buzzell Music	
September 23, 1958	I Found Love	Steve Karmen (m, w)	EU543067	Calyork Music	
September 23, 1958	Oh! Oh!	Steve Karmen (m, w)	EU543068	Calyork Music	
September 23, 1958	Watchin' and Waitin'	Steve Karmen (m, w)	EU543066	Calyork Music	
October 7, 1958	Smile for the People	Fred Elton (m, w)	EU544914	Hecht-Lancaster & Buzzell Music	
October 20, 1958	Easy Does It	Kenny Jacobson (m) & Rhoda Roberts (w)	EP123982	Hecht-Lancaster & Buzzell Music	
October 22, 1958	Separate Tables	Harry Warren (m) & Harold Adamson (l)	EP123983	Hecht-Lancaster & Buzzell Music	Separate Tables
November 14, 1958	May You Always	Dick Charles (m, w) & Larry Markes (m, w)	EU550467	Hecht-Lancaster & Buzzell Music	
December 18, 1958	May You Always	Dick Charles (m, w) & Larry Markes (m, w)	EP125691	Hecht-Lancaster & Buzzell Music	
January 26, 1959	After	Dick Charles (m, w) & Larry Markes (m, w)	EU559562	Hecht-Lancaster & Buzzell Music	
January 26, 1959	Dream Girl / Dream Boy	Kenny Jacobson (m) & Rhoda Roberts (w)	EU559561	Hecht-Lancaster & Buzzell Music	
January 26, 1959	Motherless Child	Jerry Fielding (m, a, w)	EU559560	Hecht-Lancaster & Buzzell Music	
February 26, 1959	Zeitgeist – Cafe of Blue Mirrors	Kenny Jacobson (m)	EU564334	Hecht-Lancaster & Buzzell Music	
March 12, 1959	Only Wishful Thinking	Horace Linsey (m, w), Bill Eisenhauer (m, w) & Pat Noto (m, w)	EU566792	Hecht-Lancaster & Buzzell Music	
March 17, 1959	Don't Try to Make Me Smile Tonight	Gloria Shayne (m, w) & Noel Paris (m, w)	EU567450	Hecht-Lancaster & Buzzell Music	
March 18, 1959	Somebody Loses, Somebody Wins	Kenny Jacobson (m) & Rhoda Roberts (w)	EU567735	Hecht-Lancaster & Buzzell Music	
March 24, 1959	Enthusiasm	Fred Elton (m, w)	EU568550	Hecht-Lancaster & Buzzell Music	
May 11, 1959	Have Another	Kenny Jacobson (m) & Rhoda Roberts (w)	EU576234	Hecht-Lancaster & Buzzell Music	
May 21, 1959	Just for Two	Kenny Jacobson (m) & Rhoda Roberts (w)	EU577817	Hecht-Lancaster & Buzzell Music	
June 1, 1959	That's the Way I Am	Gloria Shayne (m, w)	EU579267	Hecht-Lancaster & Buzzell Music	
June 10, 1959	Cinderella	Jim Palmer (m/w) & Anthony Tamburello (m, w)	EU580518	Hecht-Lancaster & Buzzell Music	
June 16, 1959	Smile for the People	Fred Elton (m, w)	EP131071	Hecht-Lancaster & Buzzell Music	
June 26, 1959	Absence	Laurindo Almeida (m)	EU582858	Hecht-Lancaster & Buzzell Music	Cry Tough
June 26, 1959	The Big Town	Laurindo Almeida (m)	EU582853	Hecht-Lancaster & Buzzell Music	Cry Tough
June 26, 1959	Club Caballeros	Laurindo Almeida (m)	EU582855	Hecht-Lancaster & Buzzell Music	Cry Tough
June 26, 1959	Luna De Miel	Laurindo Almeida (m)	EU582852	Hecht-Lancaster & Buzzell Music	Cry Tough
June 26, 1959	Mambo a la Teen	Laurindo Almeida (m)	EU582857	Hecht-Lancaster & Buzzell Music	Cry Tough
June 26, 1959	Mambo Sin Mayores Consecuencias	Laurindo Almeida (m)	EU582859	Hecht-Lancaster & Buzzell Music	Cry Tough
June 26, 1959	Nena	Laurindo Almeida (m)	EU582862	Hecht-Lancaster & Buzzell Music	Cry Tough
June 26, 1959	The Old Man's Mambo	Laurindo Almeida (m)	EU582854	Hecht-Lancaster & Buzzell Music	Cry Tough
June 26, 1959	Sarita's Mambo	Laurindo Almeida (m)	EU582856	Hecht-Lancaster & Buzzell Music	Cry Tough
June 26, 1959	Stool Pigeon	Laurindo Almeida (m)	EU582851	Hecht-Lancaster & Buzzell Music	Cry Tough
June 26, 1959	The Suspense Cha-Cha	Laurindo Almeida (m)	EU582860	Hecht-Lancaster & Buzzell Music	Cry Tough
June 26, 1959	Trece Perros	Laurindo Almeida (m)	EU582861	Hecht-Lancaster & Buzzell Music	Cry Tough
July 9, 1959	Midnight Blues	Kenny Jacobson (m) & Rhoda Roberts (w)	EU584540	Hecht-Lancaster & Buzzell Music	
July 9, 1959	This Could Be the Night	Kenny Jacobson (m) & Rhoda Roberts (w)	EU584541	Hecht-Lancaster & Buzzell Music	
July 21, 1959	The Rabbit Trap Theme	Jack Marshall (m)	EU586203	Hecht-Lancaster & Buzzell Music	The Rabbit Trap
July 29, 1959	Growing Up	Kenny Jacobson (m) & Rhoda Roberts (w)	EU587262	Hecht-Lancaster & Buzzell Music	
September 3, 1959	Take a Giant Step	Jay Livingston (m, w) & Ray Evans (m, w)	EP133495	Hecht-Lancaster & Buzzell Music	Take a Giant Step
October 16, 1959	Does She, or Doesn't She?	Jerry Alters (m) & Don Meyer (w)	EU598106	Hecht-Lancaster & Buzzell Music	
October 20, 1959	I'll Always Remember	Dick Charles (m, w) & Larry Markes (m, w) & Murray Kane (m, w)	EU596288	Hecht-Lancaster & Buzzell Music	
December 9, 1959	Ben Bernard Theme No. I	Benjamin Frankel (m)	EU604954	Hecht-Lancaster & Buzzell Music	Summer of the Seventeenth Doll
December 9, 1959	Ben Bernard Theme No. II	Benjamin Frankel (m)	EU604953	Hecht-Lancaster & Buzzell Music	Summer of the Seventeenth Doll
December 11, 1959	I Care	Jaye P. Morgan (m, w) & Lu Ann Simms (m w)	EU605544	Hecht-Lancaster & Buzzell Music	
December 11, 1959	If Something's Gonna Happen Let It Happen	Jaye P. Morgan (m, w) & Lu Ann Simms (m, w)	EU605543	Hecht-Lancaster & Buzzell Music	
December 11, 1959	Love Has Gone	Jaye P. Morgan (m, w) & Lu Ann Simms (m, w)	EU605546	Hecht-Lancaster & Buzzell Music	
December 11, 1959	Somewhere There's a Rainbow	Jaye P. Morgan (m, w) & Lu Ann Simms (m, w)	EU605545	Hecht-Lancaster & Buzzell Music	
March 23, 1960	The Unforgiven – The Need for Love	Dimitri Tiomkin (m) & Ned Washington (l)	EP139141	Hecht & Buzzell Music	The Unforgiven

== Partial list of releases ==
Though Hecht, Lancaster and Buzzell briefly operated the record labels Calyork Records and Maine Records, the majority of the recordings made from their published songs have been released on vinyl, cassette, CD and digitally through other record labels. This list is an attempt to document the company's efforts.

Legend:

≈ Cromwell Music publishing

† Hecht-Lancaster & Buzzell Music publishing

¤ Calyork Music publishing

‡ Hecht & Buzzell Music publishing

=== Singles ===
Date	Record label	Catalog number	Artist	A Side	B Side	Ref.
May 1955	MGM Records	MGM 11981	Dave (Tico) Robbins Quintette	"Silvana Mangano Mambo"	"Saturday Night Mambo" ≈	
May 1955	MGM Records	K11970	The Naturals	"Marty" ≈	"The Jitterbug Waltz"	
June 1955	Coral Records	Coral 61425	Les Brown Orchestra	"Something's Gotta Give"	"Saturday Night Mambo" ≈	
June 1955	Columbia Records	Columbia 40513	The Chappaqua High School Kids	"Marty" ≈	"East Side, West Side"	
June 1956	Columbia Records	Columbia 40725	Muir Mathieson Orchestra	"Lola's Theme" ≈	"Mike and Lola's Love Theme" ≈	
July 1956	Coral Records	Coral 61681	Steve Allen	"Lola's Theme" ≈	"Conversation (on the Telephone)"	
July 1956	Mercury Records	Mercury 70197	Ralph Marterie and His Orchestra	"Lola's Theme" ≈	"Yes Sir, That's My Baby"	
April 1957	RCA Victor Records	Victor 6896	Alex North Orchestra	"Theme from Playhouse 90"	"Theme from The Bachelor Party" †	
June 1957	Columbia Records	Columbia 40937	Lu Ann Simms	"Run, Don't Walk" †	"The Still Small Voice"	
June 1957	Cabot Records	Cabot 104	Danny Davis	"I Wonder Why" †	"To Mend My Broken Heart"	
July 1957	Decca Records	Decca 30390	Mark Murphy	"Goodbye Baby" ¤	"The Right Kind of Woman"	
July 1957	Decca Records	Decca 30379	Elmer Bernstein	"The Street" ¤	"Toots Shor's Blues" ¤	
1957	Decca Records	Decca 30485	Kenny Rankin	"Saturday After the Game"	"I'll Be Waitin'" †	
October 1957	Mercury Records	Mercury 71208	Steve Karmen	"How Soon"	"Didja Mean Whatcha Said?" †	
December 1957	Jubilee Records	Jubilee 5313	Don Rondo	"Made for Each Other" †	"What a Shame"	
1958	Calyork Records	none	The Flipteens	"Anxiously Waiting" ¤	"She Flipped Me" ¤	
April 1958	Jubilee Records	Jubilee 5321	Lu Ann Simms	"The Mooch" †	"Bye Um Bye" †	
April 1958	Decca Records	Decca 30641	Jack Pleis Orchestra	"Run Silent Run Deep" †	"Gigi"	
April 1958	Columbia Records	Columbia 41161	Jill Corey	"Sweet Sugar Lips"	"Lovable" †	
July 1958	Date Records	Date 1004	The Temples	"Whispering Campaign" ¤	"I Don't Want to Do a Thing But Love You" ¤	
1958	Decca Records	Decca 9–30562	Merv Griffin with The Spellbinders	"Introduce Me to the Gal"	"You're the Prettiest Thing" †	
1958	Jubilee Records	Jubilee 5329	Bobby Miller	"Baby, Je Vous Aime" †	"Crazy Dreamer" †	
October 1958	Columbia Records	Columbia 41287	Vic Damone	"We Kiss in a Shadow"	"Separate Tables" †	
October 1958	ABC-Paramount Records	ABC 9971	Eydie Gormé	"Separate Tables" †	"The Voice in My Heart"	
October 1958	Jubilee Records	Jubilee 1092	Lu Ann Simms	"Separate Tables" † / "There Will Never Be Another You"	"You're Getting to be a Habit with Me" / "Oh That Kiss"	
November 1958	Coral Records	Coral 62059	McGuire Sisters	"May You Always" †	"Achoo-Cha Cha (Gesundheit)"	
November 1958	Mercury Records	Mercury 71386	Steve Karmen	"Watchin' and Walkin'" ¤	"Oh! Oh!" ¤	
January 1959	London Records	London 45–1848	Mantovani	"Separate Tables" †	"Under Paris Skies"	
February 1959	Warner Bros. Records	Warner Bros. 5036	Margaret Ann and the Ja Da Quartette	"My Cutey's Due at Two to Two Today"	"Good Time Charlie" †	
March 1959	Maine Records	Maine 6000	Ken Colby	"Cafe of Blue Mirrors" †	"Ragamuffin's Holiday" †	
March 1959	Columbia Records	Columbia 41360	Jill Corey	"Love Will Find Out the Way"	"Dream Boy" †	
April 1959	Coral Records	Coral 62108	Lillian Briggs	"Rag Mop"	"Smile for the People" †	
June 1959	RCA Victor Records	Victor 7554	Lou Monte	"Pistol Packin' Mama"	"Have Another" †	
July 1959	MGM Records	MGM 12815	Jaye P. Morgan	"Somebody Else Is Taking My Place"	"Somebody Loses, Somebody Wins" †	
August 1959	Capitol Records	Capitol 4259	Tommy Sands	"I'll Be Seeing You"	"The Way I Am" †	
September 1959	ABC-Paramount Records	ABC 10046	Johnny Nash	"But Not for Me"	"Take a Giant Step" †	
October 1959	Decca Records	Decca 30981	Margaret Imlau	"Bye Um Bye" †	"No No Baby"	
October 1959	Top Rank Records	Top Rank 2018	Herb Corey	"Midnight Blues" †	"This Could Be the Night" †	
January 1960	Kapp Records	Kapp 315	The Arena Twins	"Jimbalay'a"	"This Could Be the Night" †	
February 1960	Apollo Records	Apollo 3854	Bobby Miller	"That's All That Matters" †	"The Wonder of It All" †	
February 1960	Jubilee Records	Jubilee 5383	Lu Ann Simms	"After" †	"Just About" ¤	
March 1960	United Artists Records	UA 221	Don Costa	"Theme from The Unforgiven (The Need for Love)" ‡	"Streets of Paris"	
April 1960	Coral Records	Coral 62196	McGuire Sisters	"Theme from The Unforgiven (The Need for Love)" ‡	"I Give Thanks"	
May 1960	Mercury Records	Mercury 71628	Clyde Otis	"Theme from The Unforgiven" ‡	"It's So Much Fun"	
1960	His Master's Voice	His Master's Voice POP756	Ronnie Hilton	"Theme from The Unforgiven" ‡	"The Girl I Used to Know"	
1960	Pye Records	7N.15271	The Wally Stott Orchestra And Chorus	"Theme from The Unforgiven" ‡	"Mr. Lucky"	
1960	Parlophone Records	45-R 4663	Ron Goodwin and His Orchestra	"Theme from The Unforgiven" ‡	"Theme from Ben Hur"	

=== LPs ===
Date	Record label	Catalog number	Artist	Title	Song(s)	Ref.
June 1956	Columbia Records	CL 870	Malcolm Arnold	Trapeze ≈	All	
June 1957	Decca Records	DL 8610	Elmer Bernstein	Music from the Sound Track Sweet Smell of Success ¤	All	
July 1957	Decca Records	DL 8614	Chico Hamilton Quintet	The Chico Hamilton Quintet Plays Jazz Themes Recorded for the Sound Track of the Motion Picture Sweet Smell of Success ¤	All	
January 1959	Everest Records	LPBR 5018	Anthony Tamburello	Music Tailored To Your Taste... ¤	All	
January 1959	Jubilee Records	JLP 1092	Lu Ann Simms	At Separate Tables †	"Separate Tables"	
1959	M-G-M Records	E 3774	Jaye P. Morgan	Slow and Easy	"Just for Two"	
November 1959	Capitol Records	ST 1263	Laurindo Almeida	Happy Cha Cha Cha †	All	
March 1960	United Artists Records	UAL 4068 / UAS 5068	Dimitri Tiomkin	The Unforgiven ‡	All	
July 15, 1963	Columbia Records	CS 8844	Johnny Mathis	Johnny †	"Easy Does It"	
