= Summer of the Seventeenth Doll (1959 film) =

1959 film by Leslie Norman

- Directed by: Leslie Norman
- Written by: John Dighton
- Based on: the play by Ray Lawler
- Produced by: Leslie Norman
- Starring: Ernest Borgnine; Anne Baxter; Angela Lansbury; John Mills
- Cinematography: Paul Beeson
- Edited by: Gordon Hales
- Music by: Benjamin Frankel
- Production company: Hecht-Hill-Lancaster (Australia) Proprietary Limited
- Distributed by: United Artists
- Release dates: 3 December 1959 (Australia); 1 October 1961 (US)
- Running time: 94 min.
- Countries: Australia; United Kingdom; United States
- Language: English

Summer of the Seventeenth Doll (U.S. title: Season of Passion) is a 1959 Australian-British film directed by Leslie Norman and starring Ernest Borgnine, Anne Baxter, John Mills and Angela Lansbury. It was written by John Dighton based on the 1955 Ray Lawler play Summer of the Seventeenth Doll. It has been called "one of the most frustrating movies ever made in Australia" because "it had terrific source material, the backing of a Hollywood studio, a decent group of filmmakers" but the result was critically and commercially underwhelming.

== Plot ==
Queensland sugarcane cutters Roo and Barney spend the off season in Sydney each year, seeing their girlfriends. For sixteen years Roo has spent the summer with barmaid Olive, bringing her a kewpie doll, while Barney romances Nancy. In the seventeenth year, Barney arrives to find that Nancy has married; however Olive has arranged a replacement, manicurist Pearl. Roo has had a bad season, losing his place as head of the cane cutting team to a younger man, Dowd.

Barney tries to smooth things over between Roo and Dowd, who falls for Bubba, a girl who has grown up with the cane cutters. Barney leaves to work with Dowd. We learn that Dowd has proposed to Bubba, and she now intends to go with him to Queensland. Roo proposes to Olive, who is devastated by this, refusing his proposal and demanding that Roo return their lives to the way they were. Roo leaves, and we see him next saying farewell to Barney and the other cane cutters, along with Bubba, as they board the train for Queensland. Roo then returns to the bar where Olive is working, and the pair are shown laughing together as Roo drinks his beer.

== Cast ==
- Ernest Borgnine as Roo
- Anne Baxter as Olive
- John Mills as Barney
- Angela Lansbury as Pearl
- Vincent Ball as Dowd
- Ethel Gabriel as Emma
- Janette Craig as Bubba
- Deryck Barnes as Bluey
- Alan García as Dino
- Tom Lurich as The Atom Bomber
- Dana Wilson as The Bomber's Daughter
- Frank Wilson as Vince

== Play ==
Summer of the Seventeenth Doll is a pioneering Australian play written by Ray Lawler and first performed at the Union Theatre in Melbourne, Australia on 28 November 1955. The play is almost unanimously considered by scholars of literature to be the most historically significant in Australian theatre history, openly and authentically portraying distinctly Australian life and characters. It was one of the first truly naturalistic "Australian" theatre productions.

== Development ==
The play premiered in London in 1957 and was a big hit. Film rights were purchased by Hecht Hill Lancaster (HHL) in July 1957 for a reported US$300,000 (or £134,000). The play had reportedly been recommended to Harold Hecht of HHL by Laurence Olivier, who directed the London production.

HHL announced the film would be part of a 12-picture slate to be released through United Artists; other films included Take a Giant Step, The Unforgiven, The Rabbit Trap and Cry Tough. In its announced planning Doll would star Burt Lancaster and Rita Hayworth who had just successfully paired in HHL's Separate Tables, a film which coincidentally featured Australian Rod Taylor, a perfect fit were initial considerations to proceed for the young buck Dowd.

In January 1958 it was announced the lead roles would be played by Lancaster, Rita Hayorth and possibly James Cagney. "Cagney will be ideal for the smaller of the two men in the story," said Lancaster. He has read the play and likes it enormously." Lancaster did add that "It is a little early yet and we have made no cast iron plans. We intend to recruit nearly all other players from Australian acting ranks. The size of the American crew to go to Australia has to be worked out. We have to find out the Australian union situation on this." John Huston and Carol Reed were listed as possible directors.

The play debuted on Broadway on 22 January 1958 but only ran 29 performances.

=== Casting ===
According to John Mills, Carol Reed was going to direct with Burt Lancaster to play Roo and Mills as Barney. However, after the play flopped on Broadway, Mills said that HHL lost enthusiasm, cut the budget, including removing large scale cane cutting sequences. Eventually Leslie Norman (who had previously produced Eureka Stockade and Bitter Springs and directed The Shiralee in Australia) directed and Ernest Borgnine played the lead. Mills wanted to drop out but was persuaded to stay on by Carol Reed who pointed out it was a good part. In addition to Lancaster, Hayworth, who was married to producer James Hill, was also dropped in September 1958, and replaced by Anne Baxter. The reason given for the dropping of Lancaster and Hayworth was that the filming dates had been brought forward and interfered with their other commitments. Borgnine later said "as far as the accent is concerned, I will be giving the essence of an Australian accent, but the performance will be for the entire world, not just Australia."

Vincent Ball says his involvement with the film began when John Mills asked Ball to help his daughter Juliet Mills, who was testing for the part of Bubba, with her Australian accent. John Mills then asked Ball to help him with Mills' Australian accent. The producers enquired about Ball's availability; he sent on some footage from A Town Like Alice and Ball was cast in the role. "When Burt Lancaster dropped out the budget went right down," said Ball.

The one member of the original stage production to repeat her performance for the film was Ethel Gabriel. Her fee was $750 a week for two weeks.

The part of Bubba was given to local actor Janette Craig, who worked regularly on television and radio. She was cast on the first day of filming. Dana Wilson, who was in The Shiralee had a part especially written for her as the daughter of an amusement park wrestler.

=== Script ===
HHL assigned the adaptation to John Dighton, who had just written The Devil's Disciple for the company. He was working on the script in January 1958. Dighton travelled to Australia with his wife to research the script, arriving 3 March 1958 (at which time the film was still to star Lancaster). Dighton told the press he was not sure why he had been given the job of writing the script but assured Australian journalists "We will probably have to change the more abstruse terms but I intend to stick as closely as I possibly can to the original story. I want to talk to as many Australians as possible, particularly cane cutters and barmaids."

Dighton told the press in April 1958 that:

I intend to stick to the play as closely as possible. The two barmaids and the old woman are good characters, but a little more colour is needed in the development of the relationship between the two cane-cutters. In its construction Lawler's play runs downhill all the way. This, I feel, was a weakness. I intend to give the film version what I regard as a necessary build-up to a dramatic peak in the middle.

Leslie Norman later claimed "I want to keep it Australian, but unfortunately the Americans said they couldn't understand the Australian accent and I had to cut out all the Australianisms. That picture broke my heart. ... What buggered him [John Dighton] - and me - was cutting out the Australianness and giving it a more upbeat ending. It is one of the best plays I have ever seen, but I can't say I'm happy with the film."

The film was criticised by some fans of the play, whose complaints were rooted in several criticisms:

- The "Americanization" of the text, in particular the casting of American actor Borgnine, who played his character (Roo) with an American accent. Others have thought the film was a recruiting film for migrants with the Englishman John Mills as Barney and Alan Garcia as Dino, an Italian friend and fellow cane cutter who does not feature in the play. The female leads are played by Anne Baxter and Angela Lansbury, though the film features many Australian actors.
- The change of location from Melbourne to Sydney. The film is set in Sydney and shows the characters enjoying themselves against the glamorous backdrop of Bondi Beach and Luna Park Sydney rather than the rather more subdued action within the confines of the then working-class Melbourne suburb of Carlton shown in the play.
- The drastic changes to key plot points, in particular the alternate, "happy", ending. This alternate ending was considered by some to indicate a serious misunderstanding of the play and its message. The alternate ending may be seen as an attempt to make the film an international success at the box office, with the producers hoping for critical acclaim similar to the working class urbanism found with Borgnine's Marty.
- The restructuring of the play including adding a scene where Roo takes part in a wrestling match at Luna Park and where Dowd agrees to serve under Roo.

Another account claimed the film's flaws "lay in three main areas: a) unsexy male stars, b) weird combination of accents, and c) script."

Norman felt the play flopped in the US due to unfamiliarity with Australian slang. He said two versions of certain scenes were made, one for American audiences the other for Australian audiences. For instance, American scenes would refer to "dames" while Australian ones who refer to "sheilas". "In this way we hope to make the film a success in both countries," said Norman, who arrived in Australia on 9 December 1958.

== Shooting ==
Sydney Sun Herald 1 Feb 1959 p 41

Shooting began on 29 December 1958, in Sydney at Pagewood Studios. There were some location scenes filmed at Luna Park Melbourne and Bondi Beach. For one scene, Sydney residents on the shore were asked to leave their lights burning to provide a romantic backdrop to the action. Leslie Norman put an advertisement in the local newspaper thanking people for doing this.

The canecutting scenes were shot along the Tweed River. Filming wound up in February 1959.

Borgnine said he found Australians very friendly. "The Australian accent is putting us in the nuthouse," Baxter told Hedda Hopper. "Put Boston Irish, midwest American, cockney British and tropical ginger in the mixmaster and you've got Australian."

Mills says he spent hours using tapes to get the Australian accent right. Notes came back from HHL during filming that they found his accent unintelligible but Mills refused to change it.

On 16 January, a fire swept through a film vault at Pagewood Studios doing more than £500,000 worth of damage but no film stock from the movie was in the vault.

During filming Anne Baxter met Australian farmer Randolph Galt and they fell in love and later married.

The film was blacklisted by a British film union because not enough British people worked on it. There were eight British people who worked on the film, including Norman. These were suspended by the union who complained not enough British personnel worked on the film (the union wanted twelve). (There were between 70 and 80 Australian technicians on the movie.)

== Release ==
=== Australia ===
The film's world premiere was held on 2 December 1959 at Hoyt's Century, Sydney, in front of the Governor of New South Wales, Sir Edward Woodward. The film went into general release the following day.

=== United Kingdom and Ireland ===
It was also shown in the United Kingdom and Ireland in its original print. It was shown at the London Pavilion on March 19, 1960, after which it was favorably reviewed in Variety.

=== USA ===
Although announced in November 1960, the film was delayed from its American release by distributors United Artists because it felt the Australian accent would be too difficult to understand by American audiences. The company took over the production (as Hecht-Hill-Lancaster Productions had dissolved in 1959) and re-dubbed much of the Australian dialect with American voice actors in December 1960. The picture was also retitled Season of Passion for the American market. A June 1961 release was announced, but it was only released in October 1961.

The film was later paired as a double bill with The Happy Thieves (which was produced by James Hill, one of the three partners in Hecht-Hill-Lancaster Productions) when it showed in New York in 1961.

== Reception ==
=== Critical ===
Lindsay Browne of the Sydney Morning Herald said "tenderness has gone... in the screen version... the film runs efficiently and eventfully according to its own approach and somehow rather emptily too."

Colin Bennett of The Age said it "disappoints" and "lacks a heart... How much better an Australian company and Australian actors could have handled the whole thing, if they had a chance." This critic wrote a longer piece on this issue the following week.

Variety wrote that the film "emerges as a lusty, hearty pic with comedy skillfully balancing the poignancy. With several standout performances from stellar names. it should be an instant click in most situations."

The Monthly Film Bulletin wrote: "None of the essential ingredients of the play – Olive's character, the attitude of the cane-cutters, Australia itself – are ever fully revealed by Leslie Norman's loose direction. ... it is the conception that is at fault. Too much crispness and freshness obtrudes upon what should be stale, foolish and pathetic; nowhere is this more apparent than in the ending, which mars the genuine misery of the penultimate scene by tagging on an upbeat finale."

According to Sight and Sound "the first third" of the film was "a near disaster – slow, incoherent, dead" but then it improved.

Other English reviews were poor, a fact reported in Australian newspapers.

The New York Times called it "an interesting, off beat movie ... that is decidedly worth seeing."

According to Filmink magazine, casting Borgnine "put the movie behind the eight ball from the beginning. The core of The Doll is the fact that Roo and Olive have sex so hot that for five months of the year that they can’t stop thinking about it for the other seven months – and, sorry, we don’t get that from Ernest Borgnine and Anne Baxter." The magazine also argued that the accents of Borgnine, Baxter and Mills "are so distracting that it damages the film" but that the main damage was done by the script, whose flaws include "a twelve-minute sequence of people being happy that has nothing to do with the play", the loss of more vital scenes, the reduction of importance of Barney, Pearl and Emma, and the ending, stating "An incredibly powerful, albeit depressing, ending that is true to the characters has been replaced by an ending that is depressing but has no power and is not true to the characters."

=== Box office ===
In May 1960 Britain's Kinematograph Weekly reported the film "hasn't been much of a success [at the box office]. The lowlife Australian comedy melodrama is, as most bookers feared, not quite to our taste."

According to a history of United Artists, the film was one of four movies by Hecht Hill Lancaster – the others were The Rabbit Trap, Cry Tough and Take a Giant Step – that all went over budget as a group by $500,000 and all the films lost money. This, along with the poor box office performance of other HHL films like The Devil's Disciple, resulted in HHL being ultimately wound up.
