= Sweet Smell of Success (disambiguation) =

Sweet Smell of Success may refer to:

- Sweet Smell of Success, a 1957 film noir drama
- Sweet Smell of Success (soundtrack), the score of the 1957 film, composed by Elmer Bernstein and Chico Hamilton
- Sweet Smell of Success (song), a 2001 song by American rock band Tomahawk
- Sweet Smell of Success (musical), a 2002 musical based on the 1957 film
- Sweet Smell of Success – Best of the Epic Years, a 2003 compilation album by English rock band the Stranglers
- "Sweet Smell of Success" (Alvin and the Chipmunks), a 1986 television episode
