= Sweet Smell of Success (soundtrack) =

Soundtrack to the 1957 film of the same name

- Elmer Bernstein sound track cover art

Soundtrack album by Elmer Bernstein/Chico Hamilton Quintet
- Released: June 12 & July 12, 1957
- Genre: Film score
- Label: Decca; DL 8610 & DL 8614
- Producer: Hecht, Hill & Lancaster

Elmer Bernstein chronology
Fear Strikes Out (1957)	Sweet Smell of Success (1957)	The Tin Star (1957)

Chico Hamilton Quintet chronology
Chico Hamilton Quintet (1956)	Sweet Smell of Success (1957)	South Pacific in Hi-Fi (1958)

Jazz Themes Cover
- Chico Hamilton Quintet sound track cover art

Sweet Smell of Success is the soundtrack to the 1957 Hecht-Hill-Lancaster Productions film of the same name. The music from the film was released by Decca Records in June 1957 on two separate long play records; one featuring Elmer Bernstein's score, the other with Chico Hamilton Quintet's music.

== Production and release ==
The film score was composed, arranged and conducted by Elmer Bernstein, but the picture also featured jazz themes performed and recorded by the Chico Hamilton Quintet. The music was published and copyrighted through producers Harold Hecht and Burt Lancaster's own music publishing company, Calyork Music, which was affiliated with BMI. Calyork Music's third partner, Loring Buzzell, was responsible for securing the release of the music on soundtrack albums through Decca Records. It was a landmark event in the soundtrack industry; the first film to have two separate soundtracks, each featuring completely different music. One LP featured Bernstein's score, the other LP featured Hamilton's band.

Sweet Smell of Success spanned two soundtrack LPs and two promotional singles. The first soundtrack LP was released in July 1957 by Decca Records (catalog DL 8610) and featured the jazz score composed by Elmer Bernstein. That same month, the lead single was released by Decca Records with the songs "The Street" and "Toots Shor's Blues" (catalog Decca 30379). The second soundtrack LP featured music composed and performed by the Chico Hamilton Quintet, who also appeared in the film. Decca Records released this LP in August 1957 (catalog DL 8614) and promoted it with a single by Mark Murphy featuring "Goodbye Baby" on the A-side and "The Right Kind of Woman" on the B-side (catalog Decca 30390).

The liner notes of the 2008 compact disc reissue state that the Bernstein score was recorded on June 12, 1957, and the Hamilton tracks on July 12, 1957, but that is inaccurate. The same reissue also omits one of the Hamilton tracks from the disc. The film premiered June 27, 1957, so the music had already been long-recorded. The dates provided in the compact disc liner notes most likely reflect the original LP release dates, which coincide with mentions in Billboard magazine.

== Critical reception ==
Professional ratings
Review scores
Source	Rating
Allmusic	4.5/5 stars
The Guardian	4/5 stars

In a retrospective review, Allmusic's Blair Sanderson noted, "The soundtrack to Alexander Mackendrick's 1957 motion picture Sweet Smell of Success combines orchestral music by the versatile Elmer Bernstein and modern jazz by the Chico Hamilton Quintet, including numbers performed in the film's club scenes. Both provide a moody backdrop to the cynical showbiz drama and intersect at several key points through the use of a common theme, the tune 'Goodbye Baby'." More specifically about Bernstein's music, he wrote of the film score composer employing "richly dissonant big band sonorities and nocturnal urban blues in his score, and much of his music has the hard-edged, gritty sound that was associated with big city life in the 1950s. Hamilton's exploratory improvisations and Bernstein's studio orchestrations make this a highly sophisticated film score".

In a 2008 review for The Guardian, John L. Walters called the soundtrack compilation "the sonic equivalent of a well-mixed Manhattan: seven cool cues by drummer Chico Hamilton's adventurous band, and 14 orchestral blasts by Elmer Bernstein".

== Track listing ==
=== Music from the Sound Track Sweet Smell of Success ===
Credits are adapted from the album's liner notes.

Side 1
No.	Title	Writer(s)	Length
1.	"The Street (Main Title)"	Bernstein	2:40
2.	"Hot Dogs and Juice (Goodbye Baby)"	Hamilton; Katz	2:28
3.	"Sidney and Susie"	Bernstein	2:46
4.	"Hunsecker's Price"	Bernstein	1:55
5.	"Tropical Island Mood"	Bernstein	2:42
6.	"The Smear"	Bernstein	1:36
7.	"Toots Shor's Blues"	Bernstein	2:48

Side 2
No.	Title	Writer(s)	Length
8.	"Nite Spot Rock"	Bernstein	1:57
9.	"Susie's Problem"	Bernstein	2:10
10.	"Hunsecker Operates (Goodbye Baby)"	Hamilton; Katz	1:31
11.	"Goodbye Baby Blues"	Hamilton; Katz	3:33
12.	"The Trap Is Sprung"	Bernstein	2:04
13.	"Love Scene (Susan – The Sage)"	Hamilton; Katz	3:35
14.	"Out of Darkness"	Bernstein	3:45
Total length:			35:36

=== The Chico Hamilton Quintet Plays Jazz Themes Recorded for the Sound Track of the Motion Picture Sweet Smell of Success ===
Credits are adapted from the album's liner notes.

Side 1
No.	Title	Writer(s)	Length
1.	"Goodbye Baby"	Hamilton; Katz	5:00
2.	"Cheek to Chico"	Hamilton; Katz	2:10
3.	"Susan (The Sage)"	Hamilton; Katz	2:30
4.	"Sidney's Theme"	Hamilton; Katz	1:55
5.	"Jonalah"	Hamilton; Katz	2:12
6.	"Jam"	Hamilton; Katz	1:46
7.	"Night Beat"	Hamilton; Katz	2:19

Side 2
No.	Title	Writer(s)	Length
8.	"Concerto of Jazz Themes from the Soundtrack of Sweet Smell of Success"	Hamilton; Katz	16:29
Total length:			34:24

== Personnel ==
Credits are adapted from the album's liner notes.

The Elmer Bernstein Orchestra

Featured on the first LP's tracks 1, 3–9, 12 & 14

- Martin Ruberman – flute
- Pete Candoli – trumpet
- Ted Nash – alto saxophone
- Lloyd Ulyate – trombone
- Mitchell Lurie – clarinet
- Gordon Schoneberg – oboe
- Jack Marsh – bassoon
- David Frisina – viola
- Armand Kaproff – cello
- John Crown
- John Williams – piano
- Lee Perrin – timpani
- Shelly Manne – drums
- Jack Hayes, Leo Shuken – orchestration

The Chico Hamilton Quintet

Featured on the first LP's tracks 2, 10, 11 & 13 and on the second LP's tracks 1–8

- Chico Hamilton – drums
- Paul Horn – tenor saxophone, alto saxophone, flute, clarinet
- Fred Katz – cello
- John Pisano – guitar
- Carson Smith – bass
