= Lu Ann Simms =

American singer (1933–2003)

- Also known as: Lu Ann Buzzell; Lu Ann Stolt
- Born: Lucille Anne Ciminelli; July 11, 1932
- Origin: Rochester, New York, United States
- Died: September 21, 2003 (aged 71) Los Angeles, California, United States
- Genres: Pop
- Occupations: Singer; music executive
- Instrument: Singing
- Years active: 1935–1989
- Labels: Columbia; Philips; Jubilee; Coronet; Top Rank; American International; Vee-Jay; Wand
- Resting place: Westwood Village Memorial Park, Westwood, California, United States
- Education: Our Lady of Mercy School for Young Women
- Height: 5"
- Spouses: Loring Buzzell (m. 1954; died 1959); Casper Stolt (m. 1961–1968)
- Children: 2
- Relatives: Edward Buzzell (uncle-in-law); Harold Hecht (brother-in-law)

Lu Ann Simms (born Lucille Anne Ciminelli; July 11, 1932 – September 21, 2003) was an American singer well known in the 1950s. A performer since the age of three, she became an overnight star in 1952 after winning first place on the singing contest Arthur Godfrey's Talent Scouts; she subsequently joined the Arthur Godfrey cast and appeared on his radio and television programs Arthur Godfrey Time, Arthur Godfrey and His Friends, The Arthur Godfrey Digest, and King Arthur Godfrey and His Round Table. She was also featured on the daytime Robert Q. Lewis show, and also appeared when Lewis was substituting for Godfrey.

== Career ==
Born in Rochester, New York, to father Aldridge Ciminelli and mother June Fox, Simms gave her first public performance on Rochester's WHEC radio aged three, singing "When You Wore a Tulip", which went down well with the audience. She attended Ss. Peter and Paul School, before continuing to Our Lady of Mercy High School. While a teenager, she sang at The Barn, also known as Gannett Youth Club, an alcohol-free venue for young people in Henrietta, every Saturday night. Simms also sold records in the Columbia Music & Appliance Store, where she earned $35 a week.

When Simms visited relatives in New York City, she got her break, appearing on Arthur Godfrey's Talent Scouts. From 1952 to 1955, Simms appeared on radio and television six days a week, at times for a total of eight separate weekly broadcasts, all with CBS for Godfrey and for Robert Q. Lewis. Her television fame was such that a doll was made in her image with her name.

Simms released a series of highly successful pop 45s on Columbia Records between 1952 and 1957, Jubilee Records between 1957 and 1960 (in addition to her sole LP), and Top Rank Records in 1960. Her recordings were licensed by such record labels as Philips Records and Coronet Records for release outside the United States. In February 1953, she scored her first and only Billboard chart hit with "Moving Away", which reached No. 30, accompanied by Percy Faith & His Orchestra.

Her stardom was short-lived, lasting only a brief eight years, mainly due to a series of personal tragedies. In October 1955, Godfrey unexpectedly fired her from his program after she gave birth to her first daughter; Simms was simultaneously dropped from her CBS radio and television contract, after serving only three of the seven years contracted. Simms nevertheless remained signed to the CBS subsidiary Columbia Records, honoring the full duration of her separate five-year recording contract. Simms' first husband, Loring Buzzell, then became her manager and secured for her a three-year recording contract at Jubilee Records. Buzzell, however, died from a sudden heart attack in 1959, a mere three months before the birth of their second daughter, a hardship from which Simms never fully recovered.

Though Simms never retired, she was only sporadically active afterward, with each of her appearances perceived by the press and fans as a series of comebacks. In late 1959, Simms began managing her late husband Buzzell's music publishing estate, which included the firms Calyork Music, Inc., Colby Music, Ltd. and Hecht-Lancaster & Buzzell Music, Inc., the last of which she initially renamed Hecht & Buzzell Music, Inc. (after the departure of partner Burt Lancaster), and then later, in 1965, Colby Music, Inc.

Through her father, Al Simms, general manager of American International Records, the record-label division of film production company American International Pictures, Simms became affiliated with the beach party film craze of the mid-1960s. She was commissioned to record several tunes intended for soundtracks of "beach party" features for American International Pictures, but her tracks were often re-recorded by the stars of the films. Some of the music she recorded was ultimately released on 45s by Vee-Jay Records and Wand Records, and appeared on some of the films' soundtrack LPs. In the 1970s, she worked as assistant to songwriter and record producer Bob Crewe at Far Out Productions, contributing backing vocals to a handful of folk and disco music concept albums.

== Personal life and death ==
Simms was first married to music publisher and record label executive Loring Buzzell, co-founder of Hecht-Lancaster & Buzzell Music and Calyork Music, and was a close personal friend of Merv Griffin, The McGuire Sisters and Jaye P. Morgan. The wedding of Simms and Buzzell took place in New York City in 1954, with two thousand people present, including celebrities. She was widowed on October 20, 1959, when he had a heart attack, aged 32. The couple had two daughters, Cindy and Lauren Beth, the latter being born in January 1960, after her father's death. In January 1985, Lauren died suddenly at the age of just 24.

In 1961, Simms married childhood sweetheart Casper Stolt and moved to Los Angeles, California, but the relationship ended in a divorce before the end of the decade.

Simms died of cancer in Hollywood, California, on September 21, 2003, aged 71.
