= Harry Kleiner =

American screenwriter (1916–2007)

- Born: September 10, 1916. Tiflis, Russian Empire
- Died: October 17, 2007 (aged 91); Chicago, Illinois, U.S.
- Known for: Screenwriter, producer

Harry Kleiner (September 10, 1916 – October 17, 2007) was an American screenwriter and producer best known for his films at 20th Century Fox.

== Select filmography ==
- Fallen Angel (1945)
- The Dark Corner (1946) - uncredited
- The Street with No Name (1948)
- Red Skies of Montana (1952)
- Kangaroo (1952) - he travelled to Australia to work on the film
- Salome (1953)
- Miss Sadie Thompson (1953)
- King of the Khyber Rifles (1953)
- Carmen Jones (1954)
- House of Bamboo (1955)
- The Violent Men (1955)
- Cry Tough (1957) - also producer
- The Rabbit Trap (1959) - producer only
- The Garment Jungle (1959) - and producer
- Ice Palace (1960)
- A Fever in the Blood (1961)
- Bus Stop (1962) (TV series)
- The Virginian (1965) (TV series)
- Fantastic Voyage (1966)
- Bullitt (1968)
- Le Mans (1971)
- Judgment: The Trial of Julius and Ethel Rosenberg (1974) (TV film)
- Extreme Prejudice (1987)
- Red Heat (1988)
