= Coronet Records =

Similarly named record labels

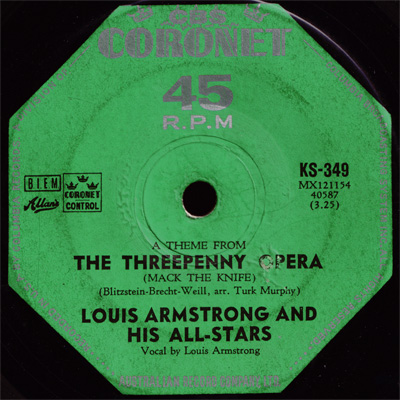
Louis Armstrong's "Mack The Knife", with octagonal label

Coronet Records is the name of at least three different record companies.

One was based in San Francisco in the 1940s and was responsible for the first recordings of Dave Brubeck. Brubeck's Coronet Records disbanded when it couldn't pay its bills and its recordings were taken over by what became Fantasy Records.

The second, a division of Premier Albums, issued a wide range of inexpensive LP records in the 1950s and 1960s in the United States. It re-released archival material from The Four Lovers, which eventually provoked a lawsuit in 1966 from Bob Gaudio and Nick Massi when the label used their images and likenesses to misportray the records as being from The Four Seasons.

The third was a record label in Australia, based in Sydney. It operated from the early 1950s until around 1962 and was recognizable by its octagonal label. Until early 1960 Coronet was the principal house label of the ARC, releasing material licensed from international labels, primarily CBS Records in the U.S., as well as material recorded by Australian artists. In 1960 ARC was taken over by CBS Records (although the company continued to trade as ARC until the late 1970s) and the Coronet label was phased out in January 1963 in favour of the new CBS Australia label, which used the CBS/Columbia "walking eye" logo.

== See also ==
- List of record labels
