= Hecht-Hill-Lancaster =

American film production company

Hecht-Hill-Lancaster was a production company formed by the actor Burt Lancaster in association with his agent, Harold Hecht, and James Hill. In 1948 Lancaster and Hecht formed Norma Productions (named after Lancaster's second wife, Norma Anderson), which later became Hecht-Lancaster. Hill joined in the mid-1950s. The company produced some of the most notable American films of the 1950s.

In 1956 they renewed their deal with United Artists. In late 1957 they announced they would make ten films worth $14 million in 1958.

== Filmography ==
- Kiss the Blood Off My Hands (1948), N
- The Flame and the Arrow (1950), N
- Ten Tall Men (1951), N
- The First Time (1952), N
- The Crimson Pirate (1952), N
- His Majesty O'Keefe (1954), N
- Apache (1954), HL
- Vera Cruz (1954), HL
- Marty (1955), HL
- The Kentuckian (1955), HL
- Trapeze (1956), HL
- The Bachelor Party (1957), HHL
- Sweet Smell of Success (1957), HHL
- Run Silent, Run Deep (1958), HHL
- Cry Tough (1958), C
- Separate Tables (1958), HHL
- Take a Giant Step (1959), HHL
- The Rabbit Trap (1959), C
- Summer of the Seventeenth Doll (1959), HHL
- The Devil's Disciple (1959), HHL
- The Unforgiven (1960), HHL
- The Young Savages (1961), HHL
- Birdman of Alcatraz (1962), HHL/N

Key
HL = Hecht-Lancaster
HHL = Hecht-Hill-Lancaster
N = Norma Productions
C = Canon Productions

=== Unmade films ===
- Bandoola
- Colonel Redl
- First Love
- The Dreamers
- Tall Dark Man
- The Hitchhiker
- The Catbird Seat
- Tell It on the Drums
- The Rock Cried Out
- Kimberley
- Blaze of the Sun
