= The Rabbit Trap =

1959 film by Philip Leacock

- Film poster
- Directed by: Philip Leacock
- Written by: JP Miller
- Based on: TV play by JP Miller
- Produced by: Harry Kleiner
- Starring: Ernest Borgnine
- Cinematography: Irving Glassberg
- Edited by: Ted Kent
- Music by: Jack Marshall
- Production companies: Hecht-Hill-Lancaster Productions; Cannon Productions; Anne Productions
- Distributed by: United Artists
- Release date: 1959
- Running time: 72 minutes
- Country: United States
- Language: English

The Rabbit Trap is a 1959 American drama film directed by Philip Leacock based on a 1955 Goodyear Television Playhouse teleplay by JP Miller.

== Plot ==
Since leaving the army ten years ago, Eddie has been working hard without any promotion, never missing a day of work and having only three weeks holiday in his ten years with his construction firm. The day after, Eddie and his wife Abby and son Duncan are granted a two-week holiday. They spend it in a mountain cabin. On the first day, Eddie and Duncan place a rabbit trap out in the countryside for the sheer joy of feeding and releasing him. Eddie is called back to work the next day, leading to arguments with Abby who insists that Eddie should remain on holiday. Eddie fears being left behind in promotion if he endangers his reputation for reliability.

Upon returning home, Duncan realizes they left the trap set and a rabbit could be trapped inside. Duncan breaks his piggy bank and returns to the mountains by himself to save the rabbit and tries to take the bus to Deep Springs to save the rabbit.

In the midst of this, his Dad gets a promotion and Judy kisses the owner of the construction firm and gives her one-week notice.

Eddie decided that it is more important to bring his son back to check the rabbit trap than his promotion and quits.

== Cast ==
- Ernest Borgnine: Eddie Colt
- David Brian: Everett Spellman
- Bethel Leslie: Abby Colt
- Kevin Corcoran: Duncan Colt
- June Blair: Judy
- Christopher Dark: Gerry
- Jeanette Nolan: Judy's mother
- Russell Collins: Hughie
- Don Rickles: Mike O'Halloran
