= Cry Tough (film) =

1959 film

- Theatrical release poster
- Directed by: Paul Stanley
- Written by: Harry Kleiner
- Based on: the novel Cry Tough by Irving Shulman
- Produced by: Harry Kleiner
- Starring: John Saxon; Linda Cristal; Joseph Calleia
- Cinematography: Irving Glassberg; Philip H. Lathrop
- Edited by: Frederic Knudtson
- Music by: Laurindo Almeida
- Production companies: Hecht-Hill-Lancaster Productions; Cannon Productions; Anne Productions
- Distributed by: United Artists
- Release date: August 1959
- Running time: 83 minutes
- Country: United States
- Language: English-Spanish

Cry Tough is a 1959 American film noir crime drama film noir directed by Paul Stanley written by Harry Kleiner, starring John Saxon, Linda Cristal and Joseph Calleia.

The screenplay of the film is based on the novel of the same name by Irving Shulman. However, in the transition from print to film the Jewish Brooklyn gang of the novel became a Puerto Rican gang in Spanish Harlem.

== Plot ==
A young Puerto Rican-American named Miguel (played by John Saxon) returns to his home in a poor section of Harlem, determined to leave his life of gang involvement behind. However, his father (played by Joseph Calleia) still sees him as a hoodrat delinquent, which motivates Miguel to prove he can change. As he struggles to resist the temptation of returning to crime and earn his father's respect, he also tries to win over Sarita (played by Linda Cristal), an undocumented immigrant. Torn between his past and his desire for a better future, Miguel must decide which path he will take.

== Cast ==
- John Saxon as Miguel Antonio Enrico Francisco Estrada
- Linda Cristal as Sarita
- Joseph Calleia as Senor Estrada
- Harry Townes as Carlos Mendoza
- Don Gordon as Incho
- Perry Lopez as Toro
- Frank Puglia as Lavandero
- Penny Santon as Señora Estrada
- Brick Sullivan as Police Car Driver
- Fred Aldrich as Street Extra

== Production ==
Produced by Harry Kleiner under Canon Productions, Anne Productions Inc., the film was based on Shulman's novel, which was originally set to be produced by Mort Briskin for Morjay Productions, Inc., and released by RKO Radio Pictures, Inc. However, Hecht-Hill-Lancaster purchased the story from Shulman in 1955.

  	In 1958 Harry Kleiner completely rewrote Shulman's "mid-depression novel about a Jewish family in Brooklyn." Kleiner had spent two weeks in Spanish Harlem interviewing a multitude of locals on all aspects of life there to gather an authentic perspective. The producers borrowed John Saxon and Linda Cristal from Universal for the film. 
   Cry Tough marked the screen's first attempt at depicting "second generation Puerto Ricans in Manhattan." Cry Tough was television director Paul Stanley's first attempt at theatrical filmmaking, and also marked the first of two films made by producer Harry Kleiner under his Canon Productions banner.

== Response to the Film ==
The public opinion of Cry Tough was mixed. With The New York Times' Bosley Crowther accusing John Saxon of doing a Marlon Brando impersonation, it confused "the ethnic factor", as well as the film's portrayal of Hispanic identity. After Cry Tough, Paul Stanley returned to episodic television and did not attempt another feature until Cotter (1973), an Irish production.
