= Burt Lancaster =

American actor (1913–1994)

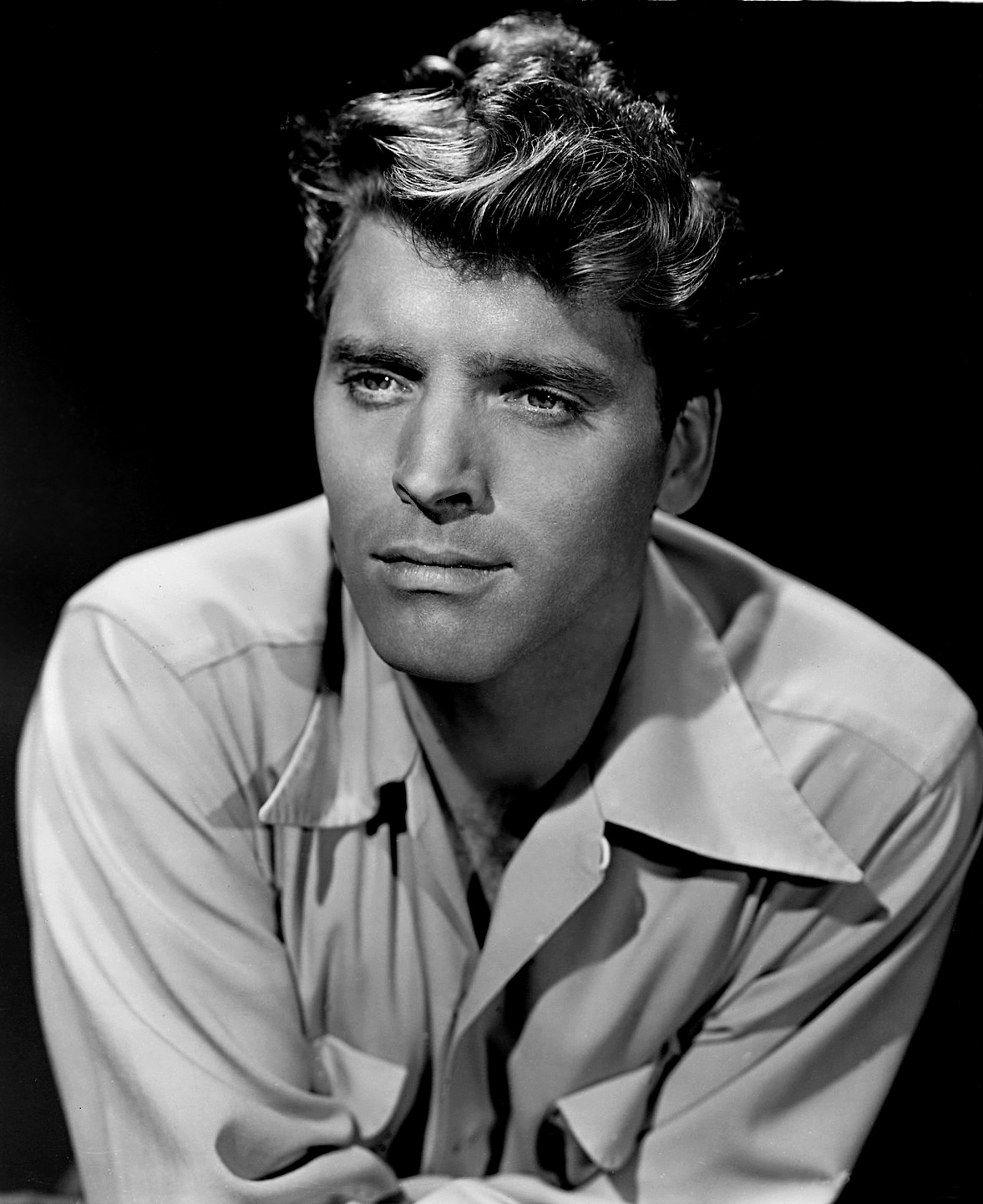
- Lancaster in Desert Fury in 1947
- Born: Burton Stephen Lancaster; November 2, 1913; New York City, U.S.
- Died: October 20, 1994 (aged 80); Los Angeles, California, U.S.
- Resting place: Pierce Brothers Westwood Village Memorial Park and Mortuary
- Occupations: Actor; film producer
- Years active: 1935–1991
- Political party: Democratic
- Spouses: June Ernst (m. 1935; div. 1946) Norma Anderson (m. 1946; div. 1969) Susan Martin (m. 1990)
- Children: 5; including Bill
- Military career
- Allegiance: United States
- Branch: United States Army
- Service years: 1943–1945
- Rank: Technician fifth grade
- Unit: 21st Special Services Division
- War: World War II

Burton Stephen Lancaster (November 2, 1913 – October 20, 1994) was an American actor. Initially known for playing tough characters with tender hearts, he went on to achieve success with more complex and challenging roles over a 45-year career in films and television series. Lancaster was a four-time nominee for the Academy Award for Best Actor (winning once), and he also won two BAFTA Awards, one Golden Globe Award for Best Lead Actor, one Silver Bear, one Volpi Cup and two David di Donatello awards. The American Film Institute ranks Lancaster as #19 of the greatest male stars of classic Hollywood cinema.

Lancaster performed as a circus acrobat in the 1930s. At the age of 32 and after serving in World War II, he landed a role in a Broadway play and drew the attention of a Hollywood agent. His appearance in film noir The Killers in 1946 with Ava Gardner was a critical success and launched both of their careers. In 1948, Lancaster starred alongside Barbara Stanwyck in the commercially and critically acclaimed film Sorry, Wrong Number, where he portrayed the husband to her bedridden invalid character. In 1953, Lancaster played the illicit lover of Deborah Kerr in the military drama From Here to Eternity. A box office smash, it won eight Academy Awards, including Best Picture, and landed a Best Actor nomination for Lancaster.

Later in the 1950s, he starred in The Rainmaker (1956) with Katharine Hepburn, earning a Best Actor Golden Globe nomination, and in 1957 he starred in Gunfight at the O.K. Corral (1957) with frequent co-star Kirk Douglas. During the 1950s, his production company Hecht-Hill-Lancaster was highly successful, with Lancaster acting in films such as: Trapeze (1956), a box office smash in which he used his acrobatic skills and for which he won the Silver Bear for Best Actor; Sweet Smell of Success (1957), a dark drama now considered a classic; Run Silent, Run Deep (1958), a World War II submarine drama with Clark Gable; and Separate Tables (1958), a hotel-set drama which received seven Oscar nominations.

In the early 1960s, Lancaster starred in a string of critically successful films, each in very disparate roles. Playing a charismatic con-man religious revivalist in Elmer Gantry in 1960 won him the Academy Award and the Golden Globe for Best Actor. Lancaster played a Nazi war criminal in 1961 in the all-star war crimes trial film Judgment at Nuremberg. Playing a bird expert prisoner in Birdman of Alcatraz in 1962, he earned the BAFTA Award for Best Foreign Actor and his third Oscar nomination. In 1963, Lancaster traveled to Italy to star as an Italian prince in Visconti's epic period drama The Leopard. In 1964, he played a US Air Force general who, opposed by a colonel played by Kirk Douglas, tries to overthrow the President in Seven Days in May. Then, in 1966, he played an explosives expert in the western The Professionals. Although the reception of his 1968 film The Swimmer was initially lackluster upon release, in the years after it has grown in stature critically and attained a cult following.

In 1970, Lancaster starred in the box-office hit, air-disaster drama Airport. In 1974, he starred in another Visconti film, Conversation Piece. He experienced a career resurgence in 1980 with the crime-romance Atlantic City, winning the BAFTA for Best Actor and landing his fourth Oscar nomination. Starting in the late 1970s, he also appeared in television mini-series, including the award-winning Separate but Equal with Sidney Poitier. He continued acting into his late 70s, until a stroke in 1990 forced him to retire; four years later he died from a heart attack. His final film role was as Moonlight Graham in Field of Dreams (1989).

== Early life ==
Lancaster was born on November 2, 1913, in New York City, at his parents' home at 209 East 106th Street, the son of Elizabeth (née Roberts) and mailman James Lancaster. Both of his parents were Protestants of working-class background. All four of his grandparents were immigrants from the province of Ulster, Ireland. His maternal side was from Belfast. Lancaster grew up in East Harlem, New York City. He developed a great interest and skill in gymnastics while attending DeWitt Clinton High School, where he was a basketball star. Before he graduated from DeWitt Clinton, his mother died of a cerebral hemorrhage. Lancaster was accepted by New York University with an athletic scholarship, but dropped out.

== Circus career ==
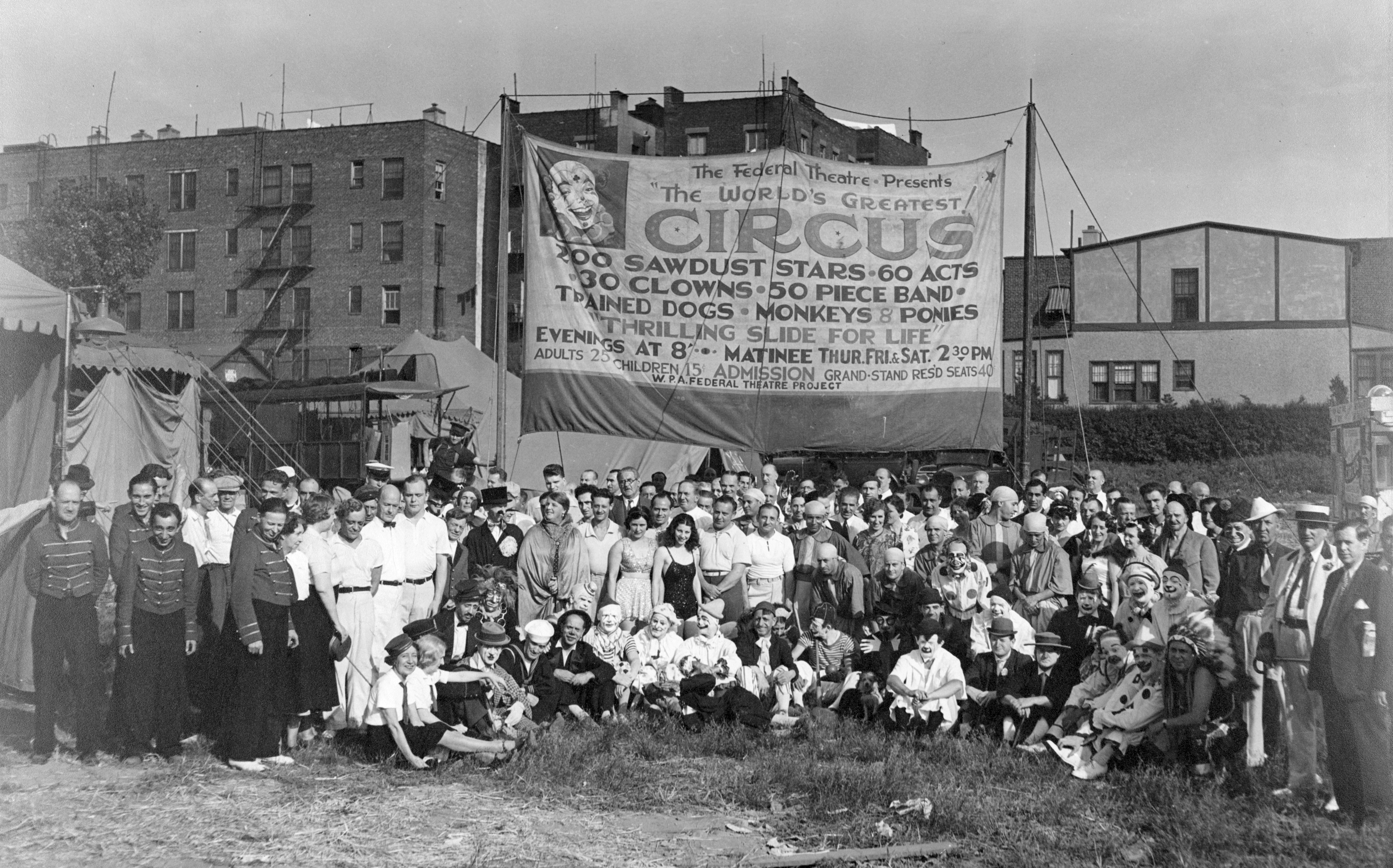
Group portrait of the Circus Unit of the WPA Federal Theatre Project, with Lancaster standing at the back

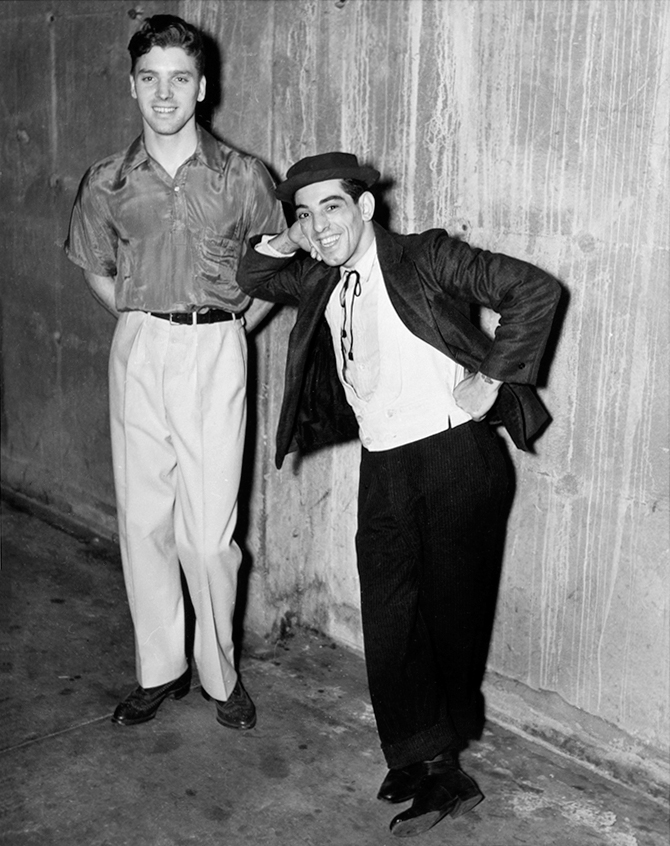
Lancaster and Nick Cravat performing with the Federal Theatre Project Circus (1935–38)

At the age of 9, Lancaster met Nick Cravat with whom he developed a lifelong partnership. Together, they learned to act in local theatre productions and circus arts at Union Settlement, one of the city's oldest settlement houses. In the 1930s, they formed the acrobat duo Lang and Cravat and soon joined the Kay Brothers circus. However, in 1939, an injury forced Lancaster to give up the profession, with great regret. He then found temporary work, first as a salesman for Marshall Field's and then as a singing waiter in various restaurants.

== World War II service ==
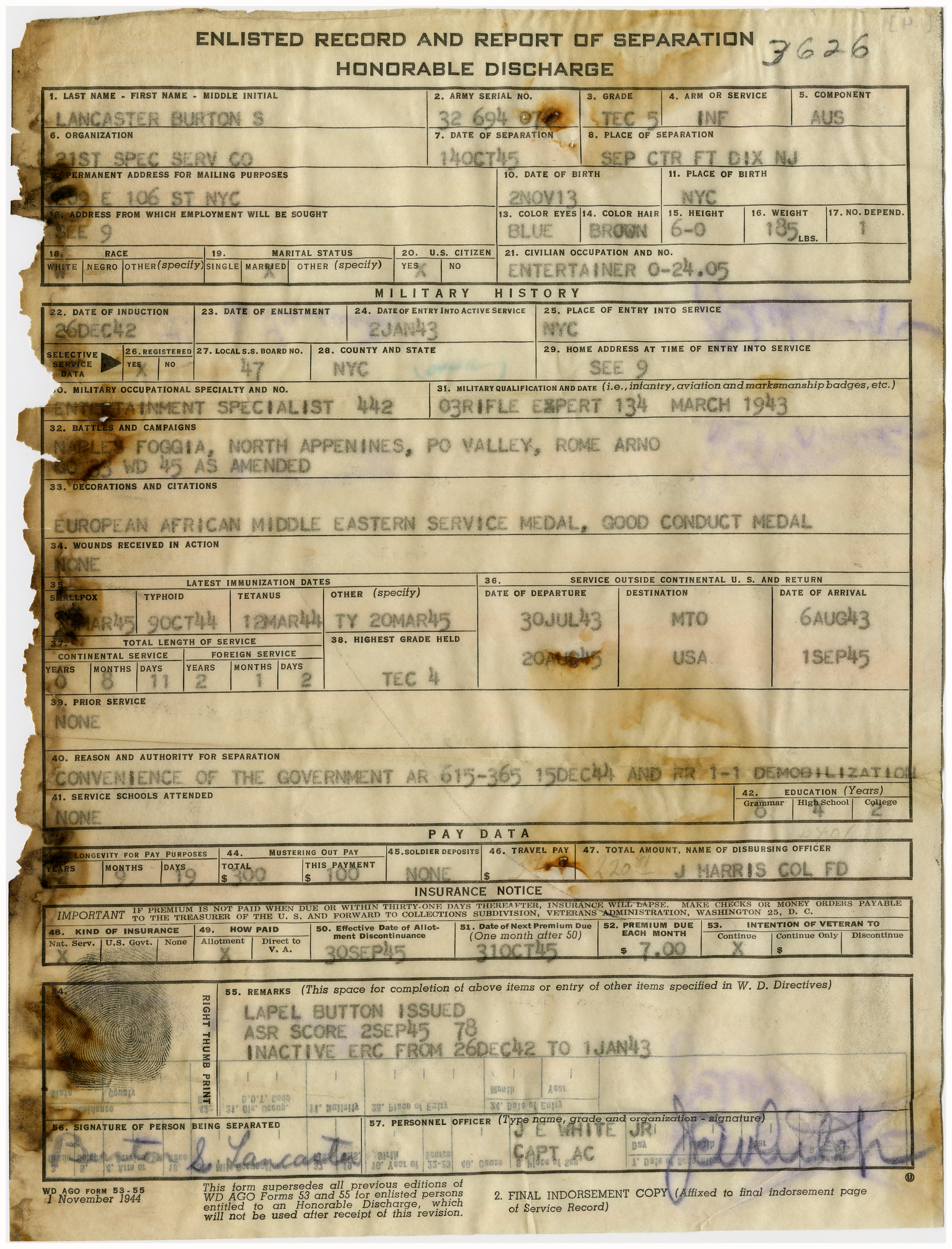
1945 Military discharge form saved from the 1973 National Personnel Records Center fire

After the United States entered World War II, Lancaster joined the United States Army in January 1943 and performed with the Army's 21st Special Services Division, one of the military units organized to follow the troops on the ground and provide USO entertainment to maintain morale. He served in the Fifth Army in Italy under General Mark Clark from 1943 to 1945. He was discharged in October 1945 as an entertainment specialist with the rank of technician fifth grade.

== Acting career ==
=== Broadway ===
Lancaster returned to New York after his Army service. Although initially unenthusiastic about acting, Lancaster was encouraged to audition for a Broadway play by a producer who saw him in an elevator while he was visiting his then-girlfriend at work. The audition was successful and Lancaster was cast in Harry Brown's A Sound of Hunting (1945). The show ran for only three weeks, but his performance attracted the interest of a Hollywood agent, Harold Hecht. Lancaster had other offers but Hecht promised him the opportunity to produce their own movies within five years of hitting Hollywood.

Through Hecht, Lancaster was brought to the attention of producer Hal B. Wallis. Lancaster left New York and moved to Los Angeles. Wallis signed him to a non-exclusive eight-movie contract.

=== Hal Wallis ===
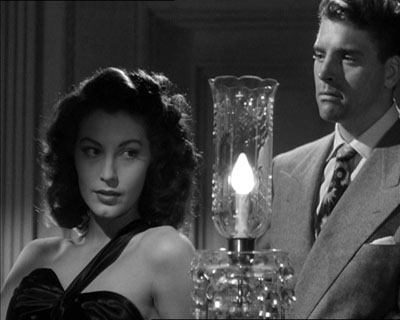
With Ava Gardner in The Killers, 1946

Lancaster's first filmed movie was Desert Fury for Wallis in 1947, where Lancaster was billed after John Hodiak and Lizabeth Scott. It was directed by Lewis Allen.

Then producer Mark Hellinger approached him to star in 1946's The Killers, from the Ernest Hemingway short story, which was completed and released prior to Desert Fury. Directed by Robert Siodmak, it was a great commercial and critical success and launched Lancaster and his co-star Ava Gardner to stardom. It has since come to be regarded as a classic.

Hellinger used Lancaster again on Brute Force in 1947, a prison drama written by Richard Brooks and directed by Jules Dassin. It was also well received. Wallis released his films through Paramount, and so Lancaster and other Wallis contractees made cameos in Variety Girl in 1947.

Lancaster's next film was a thriller for Wallis in 1947, I Walk Alone, co-starring Lizabeth Scott and a young Kirk Douglas, who was also under contract to Wallis. Variety listed it as one of the top grossers of the year, taking in more than $2 million.

In 1948, Lancaster had a change of pace with the film adaptation of Arthur Miller's All My Sons, made at Universal Pictures with Edward G. Robinson. His third film for Wallis was an adaptation of Sorry, Wrong Number in 1948, with Barbara Stanwyck.

=== Norma Productions ===
Hecht kept to his promise to Lancaster to turn producer. The two of them formed a company, Norma Productions, and did a deal with Universal to make a thriller about a disturbed G.I. in London, Kiss the Blood Off My Hands in 1948, with Joan Fontaine and directed by Norman Foster. It made a profit of only $50,000, but was critically acclaimed.

Back in Hollywood, Lancaster made another film noir with Siodmak, Criss Cross, in 1949. It was originally going to be produced by Hellinger and when Hellinger died, another took over. Tony Curtis made an early appearance.

Lancaster appeared in a fourth picture for Wallis, Rope of Sand, in 1949.

Norma Productions signed a three-picture deal with Warner Bros. The first was 1950's The Flame and the Arrow, a swashbuckler movie, in which Lancaster drew on his circus skills. Nick Cravat had a supporting role and the film was a huge commercial success, making $6 million. It was Warners' most popular film of the year and established an entirely new image for Lancaster.

Lancaster was borrowed by 20th Century Fox for Mister 880 in 1950, a comedy crime romance film with Edmund Gwenn. MGM put him in a popular Western, Vengeance Valley in 1951, then he went to Warners to play the title role in the biopic Jim Thorpe – All-American, also in 1951.

=== Halburt ===
Norma signed a deal with Columbia Pictures to make two films through a Norma subsidiary, Halburt. The first film was 1951's Ten Tall Men, where Lancaster was a member of the French Foreign Legion. Robert Aldrich worked on the movie as a production manager.

The second was 1952's The First Time, a comedy which was the directorial debut of Frank Tashlin. It was meant to star Lancaster but he wound up not appearing in the film – the first of their productions in which he did not act.

=== Hecht-Lancaster Productions ===
In 1951, the actor/producer duo changed the company's name to Hecht-Lancaster Productions. The first film under the new name was another swashbuckler: 1952's The Crimson Pirate, directed by Siodmak. Again, co-starring Nick Cravat, it was extremely popular. Taking the premise of The Flame and the Arrow a step further, it allowed the pair to, not only emphasise the absurdity of the story with more spectacle and comical situations but to demonstrate they were able to perform their own circus skills-based stunts without relying on stuntmen quite as much as most Hollywood stars. As if to downplay this, Lancaster himself speaks to the audience in the opening scene over footage of Lancaster performing a dangerous rope swing from one of his pirate ship's masts to the other. "…in a pirate world, believe only what you see." The footage is then reversed to show a near impossible backwards swing to the first mast again, from which he proclaims "No, believe HALF of what you see."

Lancaster changed pace once more by doing a straight dramatic part in 1952's Come Back, Little Sheba, based on a Broadway hit, with Shirley Booth, produced by Wallis and directed by Daniel Mann.

Alternating with adventure films, he went into South Sea Woman in 1952 at Warners. Part of the Norma-Warners contract was that Lancaster had to appear in some non-Norma films, of which this was one.

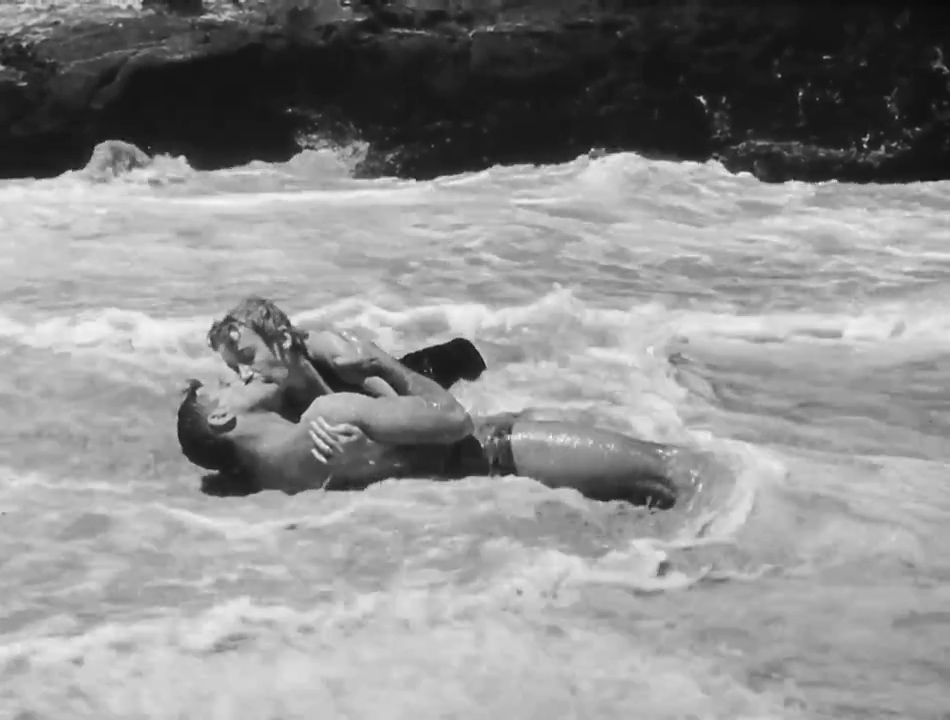
With Deborah Kerr in From Here to Eternity, 1953

In 1954, for his own company, Lancaster produced and starred in His Majesty O'Keefe, a South Sea island tale shot in Fiji. It was co-written by James Hill, who would soon become a part of the Hecht-Lancaster partnership.

=== United Artists ===
Hecht and Lancaster left Warners for United Artists, for what began as a two-picture deal, the first of which was to be 1954's Apache, starring Lancaster as a Native American.

They followed it with another Western in 1954, Vera Cruz, co-starring Gary Cooper and produced by Hill. Both films were directed by Robert Aldrich and were hugely popular.

United Artists signed Hecht-Lancaster to a multi-picture contract, to make seven films over two years. These included films in which Lancaster did not act. Their first was Marty in 1955, based on Paddy Chayefsky's TV play starring Ernest Borgnine and directed by Delbert Mann. It won both the Best Picture Oscar and the Palme d'Or award at Cannes and Borgnine an Best Actor Oscar. It also earned $2 million on a budget of $350,000. Vera Cruz had been a huge success, but Marty secured Hecht-Lancaster as one of the most successful independent production companies in Hollywood at the time. Marty star Borgnine was under contract to Hecht-Lancaster and was unhappy about his lack of upcoming roles, especially after only receiving some seven lines in 1957's Sweet Smell of Success and half of his normal pay for Marty. He eventually sued for breach of contract to gain back some of this money in 1957.

Without Hill, Hecht and Lancaster produced The Kentuckian in 1955. It was directed by Lancaster in his directorial debut, and he also played a lead role. Lancaster disliked directing and only did it once more, on 1974's The Midnight Man.

Lancaster still had commitments with Wallis, and made The Rose Tattoo for him in 1955, starring with Anna Magnani and Daniel Mann directing. It was very popular at the box office and critically acclaimed, winning Magnani an Oscar.

=== Hecht-Hill-Lancaster ===
In 1955, Hill was made an equal partner in Hecht-Lancaster, with his name added to the production company. Hecht-Hill-Lancaster (HHL) released their first film Trapeze in 1956, with Lancaster performing many of his own stunts. The film, co-starring Tony Curtis and Gina Lollobrigida, went on to become the production company's top box office success, and United Artists expanded its deal with HHL.

In 1956, Lancaster and Hecht partnered with Loring Buzzell and entered the music industry with the music publishing companies Leigh Music, Hecht-Lancaster & Buzzell Music, Calyork Music and Colby Music and the record labels Calyork Records and Maine Records.

The HHL team impressed Hollywood with its success; as Life wrote in 1957, "[a]fter the independent production of a baker's dozen of pictures, it has yet to have its first flop ... (They were also good pictures.)." In late 1957, they announced they would make ten films worth $14 million in 1958.

Lancaster made two films for Wallis to complete his eight-film commitment for that contract: The Rainmaker (1956) with Katharine Hepburn, which earned Lancaster a Golden Globe nomination for Best Actor; and Gunfight at the O.K. Corral (1957) with Kirk Douglas, which was a huge commercial hit directed by John Sturges.

Lancaster re-teamed with Tony Curtis in 1957 for Sweet Smell of Success, a co-production between Hecht-Hill-Lancaster and Curtis' own company with wife Janet Leigh, Curtleigh Productions. The movie, directed by Alexander Mackendrick, was a critical success but a commercial disappointment. Over the years it has come to be regarded as one of Lancaster's greatest films.

HHL produced seven additional films in the late 1950s. Four starred Lancaster: Run Silent, Run Deep (1958), a Robert Wise directed war film with Clark Gable, which was mildly popular; Separate Tables (1958) a hotel-set drama with Kerr and Rita Hayworth (who married James Hill), which received an Oscar nomination for Best Picture and Oscar awards for lead actor David Niven and supporting actress Wendy Hiller, and was both a critical and commercial success; The Devil's Disciple (1959), with Douglas and Laurence Olivier, which lost money (and saw Lancaster fire Mackendrick during shooting); and the Western The Unforgiven (1960), with Audrey Hepburn, which was a critical and commercial disappointment.

Three were made without Lancaster, all of which lost money: The Bachelor Party (1957), from another TV play by Chayefsky, and directed by Delbert Mann; Take a Giant Step (1959), about a black student; and Summer of the Seventeenth Doll (1960), from an Australian play, shot on location in Australia and Britain. Lancaster was originally announced as the lead for Doll but did not appear in the final film.

The Hecht-Hill-Lancaster Productions company dissolved in 1960 after Hill ruptured his relationship with both Hecht and Lancaster. Hill went on to produce a single additional film, The Happy Thieves, in a new production company, Hillworth Productions, co-owned with his wife Rita Hayworth.

=== Hecht and Lancaster ===
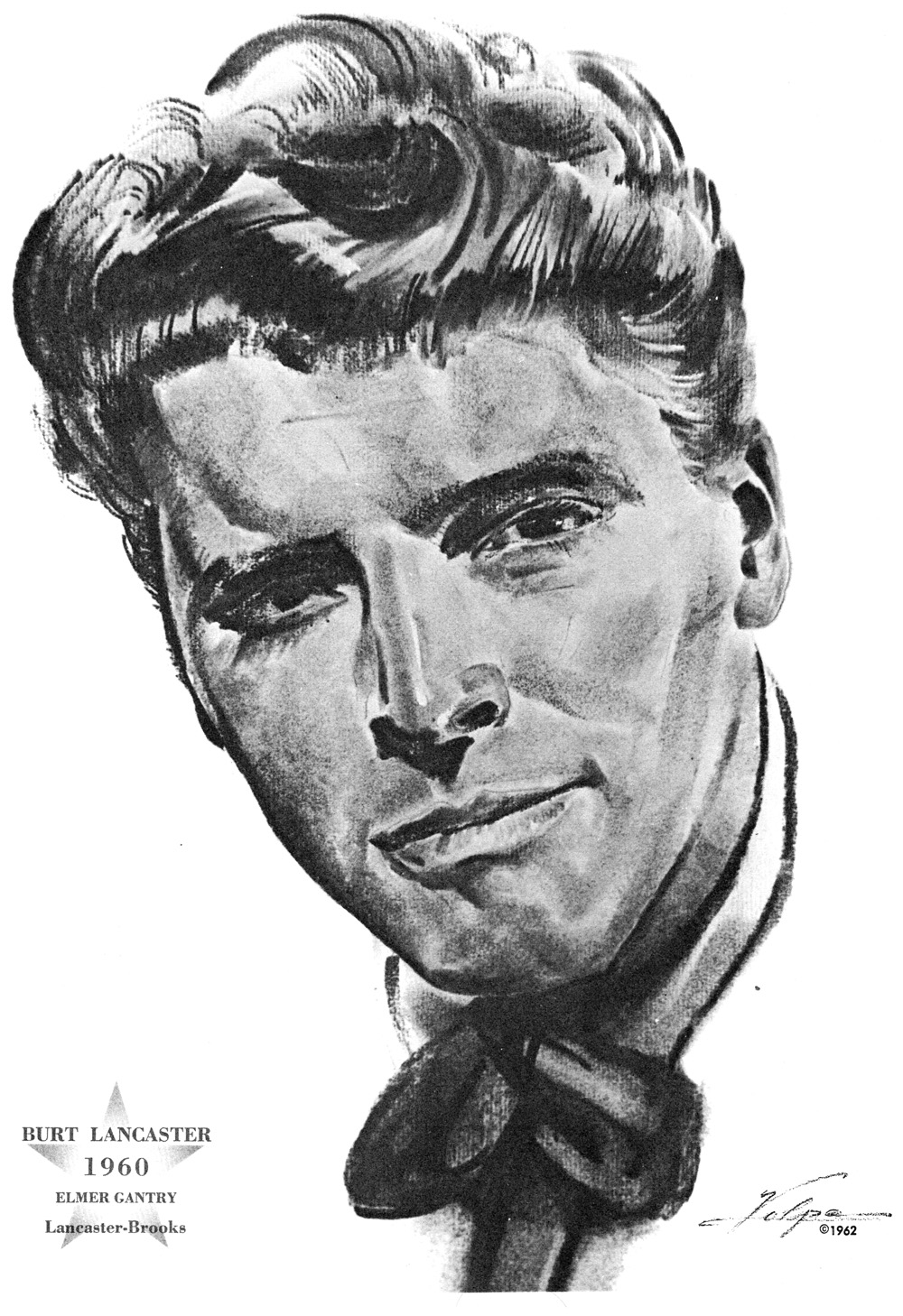
A drawing of Lancaster after he won an Oscar for Elmer Gantry, 1960. Artist: Nicholas Volpe

Lancaster played the title role in Elmer Gantry (1960), written and directed by Richard Brooks for United Artists. The film received five Academy Award nominations, including Best Picture and Best Actor. Lancaster won the 1960 Academy Award for Best Actor, a Golden Globe Award, and the New York Film Critics Award for his performance.

Hecht and Lancaster worked together on The Young Savages (1961), directed by John Frankenheimer and produced by Hecht. Sydney Pollack worked as a dialogue coach.

Lancaster starred in Judgment at Nuremberg (1961) for Stanley Kramer, alongside Spencer Tracy, Richard Widmark and a number of other stars. The film was both a commercial and critical success, receiving eleven Oscar nominations, including Best Picture.

He then did another film with Hecht and Frankenheimer (replacing Charles Crichton), Birdman of Alcatraz (1962), a largely fictionalized biography. In it he plays Robert Stroud, a federal prisoner incarcerated for life for two murders, who begins to collect birds and over time becomes an expert in bird diseases, even publishing a book. The film shows Stroud transferred to the maximum security Alcatraz prison where he is not allowed to keep birds and as he ages he gets married, markets bird remedies, helps stop a prison rebellion, and writes a book on the history of the U.S. penal system, but never gets paroled.

The sympathetic performance earned Lancaster a Best Actor Oscar nomination, a BAFTA Award for Best Actor, and a Golden Globe nomination for Best Actor in a Dramatic Role. Hecht went on to produce five films without Lancaster's assistance, through his company Harold Hecht Films Productions between 1961 and 1967, including another Academy Award winner, Cat Ballou, starring Lee Marvin and Jane Fonda.

=== Collaborations with younger filmmakers ===
Lancaster made A Child Is Waiting (1963) with Judy Garland. It was produced by Kramer and directed by John Cassavetes.

He went to Italy to star in The Leopard (1963) for Luchino Visconti, co-starring Alain Delon and Claudia Cardinale. It was one of Lancaster's favorite films and was a big hit in France but failed in the US (though the version released was much truncated).

He had a small role in The List of Adrian Messenger (1963) for producer/star Kirk Douglas, and then did two for Frankenheimer: Seven Days in May (1964), a political thriller with Douglas, and The Train (1964), a World War Two action film (Lancaster had Frankenheimer replace Arthur Penn several days into filming).

Lancaster starred in The Hallelujah Trail (1965), a comic Western produced and directed by John Sturges which failed to recoup its large cost.

He had a big hit with The Professionals (1966), a Western directed by Brooks and also starring Lee Marvin.

In 1966, at the age of 52, Lancaster appeared nude in director Frank Perry's film The Swimmer (1968), in what the critic Roger Ebert called "his finest performance". Prior to working on The Swimmer, Lancaster was terrified of the water because he did not know how to swim. In preparation for the film, he took swimming lessons from UCLA swim coach Bob Horn. Filming was difficult and clashes between Lancaster and Perry led to Sydney Pollack coming in to do some filming. The film was not released until 1968, when it proved to be a commercial failure, though Lancaster remained proud of the movie and his performance.

=== Norlan Productions ===
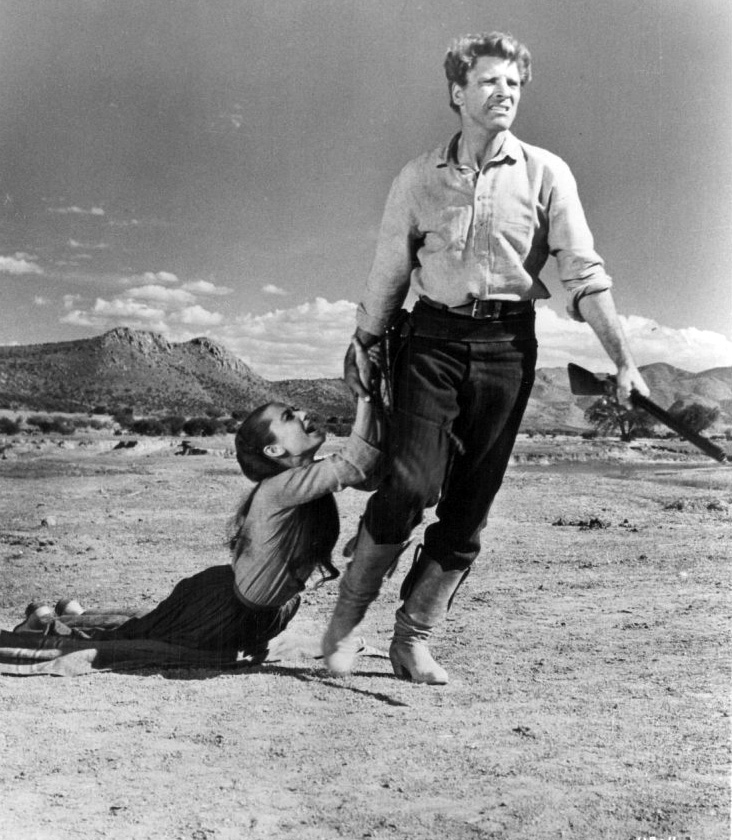
With Audrey Hepburn in The Unforgiven, 1960

In 1967, Lancaster formed a new partnership with Roland Kibbee, who had already worked as a writer on five Lancaster projects: Ten Tall Men, The Crimson Pirate, Three Sailors and a Girl (in which Lancaster made a cameo appearance), Vera Cruz, and The Devil's Disciple.

Through Norlan Productions, Lancaster and Kibbee produced The Scalphunters in 1968, directed by Sydney Pollack.

Lancaster followed it with another film from Pollack, Castle Keep in 1969, which was a big flop. So was The Gypsy Moths, for Frankenheimer, also in 1969.

=== 1970s ===
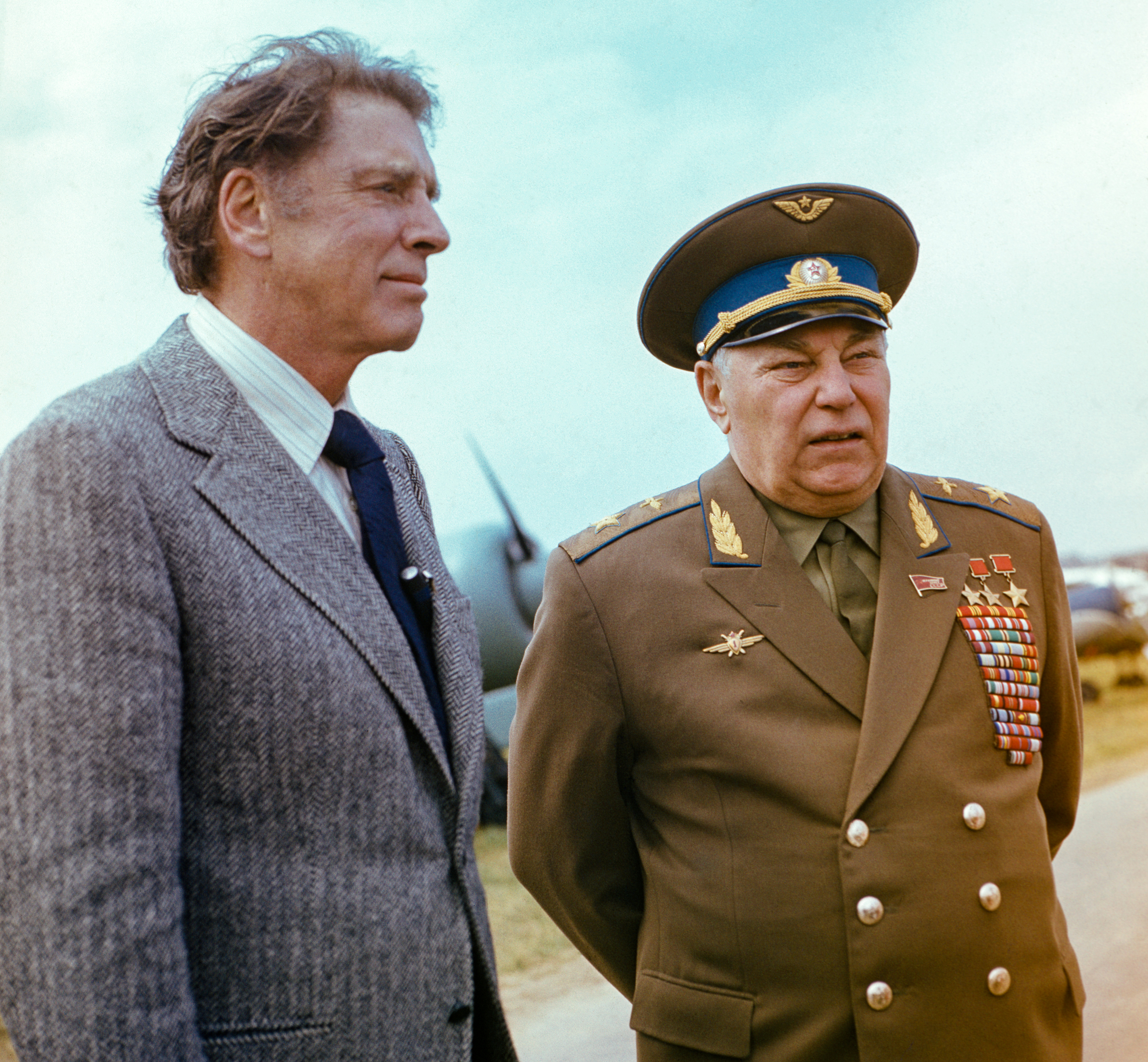
With Soviet fighter pilot Alexander Pokryshkin during documentary filming "The Unknown War", episode 9 War in the Air. Moscow, USSR, 1978, photo: Leo Medvedev

Lancaster had one of the biggest successes of his career with Airport in 1970, starring alongside Dean Martin, George Kennedy, Van Heflin, Helen Hayes, Maureen Stapleton, Barbara Hale, Jean Seberg, and Jacqueline Bisset. The Ross Hunter film received nine Academy Award nominations, including one for Best Picture. It became one of the biggest box-office hits of 1970 and, at that time, reportedly the highest-grossing film in the history of Universal Pictures.

He then went into a series of Westerns: Lawman in 1971, directed by Michael Winner; Valdez Is Coming in 1971, for Norlan; and Ulzana's Raid in 1972, directed by Aldrich and produced by himself and Hecht. None were particularly popular but Ulzana's Raid has become a cult film.

Lancaster did two thrillers, both 1973: Scorpio with Winner and Executive Action.

Lancaster returned to directing in 1974 with The Midnight Man, which he also wrote and produced with Kibee.

He made a second film with Visconti, Conversation Piece in 1974 and played the title role in the TV series Moses the Lawgiver, also in 1974.

Lancaster was one of many well-known actors in the international ensemble cast of 1975's film 1900, directed by Bernardo Bertolucci, and he had a cameo in 1976's Buffalo Bill and the Indians, or Sitting Bull's History Lesson for Robert Altman.

He played Shimon Peres in the TV movie Victory at Entebbe in 1977 and had a supporting role in The Cassandra Crossing in 1976. He made a fourth and final film with Aldrich, Twilight's Last Gleaming in 1977, and had the title role in 1977's The Island of Dr. Moreau.

Lancaster was top-billed in Go Tell the Spartans in 1978, a Vietnam War film; Lancaster admired the script so much that he took a reduced fee and donated money to help the movie to be completed. He was in Zulu Dawn in 1979.

=== 1980s ===
Lancaster began the 1980s with a highly acclaimed performance alongside Susan Sarandon in Atlantic City in 1980, directed by Louis Malle. The film received five Oscar nominations, including Best Picture and a Best Actor nomination for Lancaster.

He had key roles in Cattle Annie and Little Britches in 1981, The Skin in 1982 with Cardinale, Marco Polo, also in 1982, and Local Hero in 1983.

By now, Lancaster was mostly a character actor in features, as in The Osterman Weekend in 1983, but he was the lead in the TV movie Scandal Sheet in 1985.

He was in Little Treasure in 1985, directed by Alan Sharp, who had written Ulzana's Raid; On Wings of Eagles for TV in 1986, as Bull Simons; 1986's made for TV Barnum starred him in the title role; Tough Guys reunited him on the big screen with Kirk Douglas in 1986; Fathers and Sons: A German Tragedy (in German Väter und Söhne – Eine deutsche Tragödie) in 1986 for German TV; 1987's Control made in Italy; Rocket Gibraltar in 1988, and The Jeweller's Shop in 1989.

His first critical success in a while was Field of Dreams in 1989, in which he played a supporting role as Moonlight Graham. He was also in the miniseries The Betrothed in 1989.

=== Later career ===
Lancaster's final performances included TV miniseries The Phantom of the Opera (1990); Voyage of Terror: The Achille Lauro Affair (1990) as Leon Klinghoffer based on the 1985 MS Achille Lauro hijacking incident; and Separate But Equal (1991) with Sidney Poitier.

=== Frequent collaborators ===
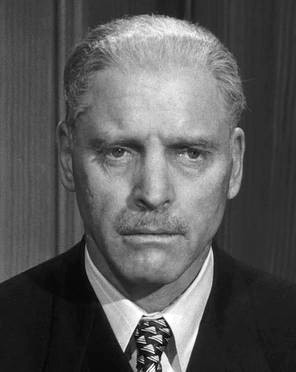
In Judgment at Nuremberg, 1961

Lancaster appeared in a total of seventeen films produced by his agent, Harold Hecht. Eight of these were co-produced by James Hill. He also appeared in eight films produced by Hal B. Wallis and two with producer Mark Hellinger. Although Lancaster's work alongside Kirk Douglas was known as that of a successful pair of actors, Douglas, in fact, produced four films for the pair, through his production companies Bryna Productions and Joel Productions. Roland Kibbee also produced three Lancaster films, and Lancaster was also cast in two Stanley Kramer productions.

==== Kirk Douglas ====
Kirk Douglas starred in seven films across the decades with Burt Lancaster: I Walk Alone (1948), Gunfight at the O.K. Corral (1957), The Devil's Disciple (1959), The List of Adrian Messenger (1963), Seven Days in May (1964), Victory at Entebbe (1976) and Tough Guys (1986), which fixed the notion of the pair as something of a team in the public imagination. Douglas was always billed under Lancaster in these movies but, with the exception of I Walk Alone, in which Douglas played a villain, their roles were usually more or less the same size. Both actors arrived in Hollywood at about the same time, and first appeared together in the fourth film for each, albeit with Douglas in a supporting role. They both became actor-producers who sought out independent Hollywood careers.

==== John Frankenheimer ====
John Frankenheimer directed five films with Lancaster: The Young Savages (1961), Birdman of Alcatraz (1962), Seven Days in May (1964), The Train (1964), and The Gypsy Moths (1969).

==== Other repeat collaborators ====
He was directed four times by Robert Aldrich, three times each by Robert Siodmak and Sydney Pollack, and twice each by Byron Haskin, Daniel Mann, John Sturges, John Huston, Richard Brooks, Alexander Mackendrick, Luchino Visconti, and Michael Winner.

Roland Kibbee wrote for seven Lancaster films. Lancaster used makeup veteran Robert Schiffer in twenty credited films, hiring Schiffer on nearly all of the films he produced.

== Political activism ==
Lancaster was a vocal supporter of progressive and liberal political causes. He frequently spoke out in support of racial and other minorities. As a result, he was often a target of FBI investigations. He was named in President Richard Nixon's 1973 "Enemies List".

A vocal opponent of the Vietnam War, he helped pay for the successful defense of a soldier accused of "fragging" (i.e., murdering) another soldier during war-time. In 1968, Lancaster actively supported the presidential candidacy of anti-war Senator Eugene McCarthy of Minnesota, and frequently spoke on his behalf during the Democratic primaries.

Lancaster was also active in anti-death penalty activism. He campaigned heavily for George McGovern in the 1972 United States presidential election.

In 1985, Lancaster joined the fight against AIDS after fellow movie star Rock Hudson contracted the disease. Lancaster delivered Hudson's last words at the Commitment to Life fundraiser at a time when the stigma surrounding AIDS was at its height.

Of his political opinions, frequent co-star Tony Curtis said: "Here's this great big aggressive guy that looks like a ding-dong athlete playing these big tough guys and he has the soul of—who were those first philosophers of equality?—Socrates, Plato. He was a Greek philosopher with a sense that everybody was equal."

Actor and SAG president Ed Asner said he showed everybody in Hollywood "how to be a liberal with balls".

=== Hollywood Ten ===
In 1947, Lancaster reportedly signed a statement release by the National Council of Arts, Sciences and Professions (NCASP) asking Congress to abolish the House Un-American Activities Committee (HUAC). He was also a member of the short-lived Committee for the First Amendment, formed in support of the Hollywood Ten. He was one of 26 movie stars who flew to Washington in October 1947 to protest against the HUAC hearings. The committee's Hollywood Fights Back broadcasts on ABC Radio Network were two 30-minute programs that took place on October 27 and November 2, 1947, during which committee members voiced their opposition to the HUAC hearings. Many members faced blacklisting and backlash due to their involvement in the committee. Lancaster was listed in anti-communist literature as a fellow traveler.

=== Civil rights movement ===
He and his second wife, Norma, hosted a fundraiser for Martin Luther King Jr. and the Student Diversity Leadership Conference (SDLC) ahead of the historic March on Washington in 1963. He attended the march, where he was one of the speakers. He flew in from France for the event, where he was shooting The Train, and flew back again the next day, despite a reported fear of flying.

On August 28, 1963, at the March on Washington Lancaster "read the speech that James Baldwin was supposed to make," because (as Malcolm X said in a speech delivered in Detroit at the King Solomon Baptist Church in late 1963) "they wouldn't let Baldwin get up there because they know Baldwin is liable to say anything."

=== ACLU ===
In 1968, Lancaster was elected to serve as chairman of the Roger Baldwin Foundation, a newly formed fund-raising arm of the American Civil Liberties Union of Southern California. His co-chairs were Frank Sinatra and Irving L. Lichtenstein. In October 1968, he hosted a party at his home to raise money for the ACLU to use for the defense of the more than four hundred people arrested at the 1968 Democratic National Convention. Throughout the years, he remained an ardent supporter and a fundraiser for the organization.

While serving as a member of the five-person ACLU Foundation executive committee, he cast the key vote to retain Ramona Ripston as executive director of the Southern California affiliate, a position she would build into a powerful advocacy force in Los Angeles politics. Ripston later recalled: "There was a feeling that a woman couldn't run the ACLU foundation, nor have access to the books. The vote finally came down to two 'yes' and two 'no.' Who had the deciding vote? Burt. He had a scotch or two and finally he said, 'I think she should be executive director.' I always loved him for that."

When President George H. W. Bush derided Democratic candidate Michael Dukakis as a "card-carrying member of the ACLU", Lancaster was one of the supporters featured in the organization's first television advertising campaign stating: "I'm a card-carrying member of the ACLU" and "No one agrees with every single thing they've done. But no one can disagree with the guiding principle—with liberty and justice for all.'" He also campaigned for Michael Dukakis in the 1988 United States presidential election.

== Personal life ==
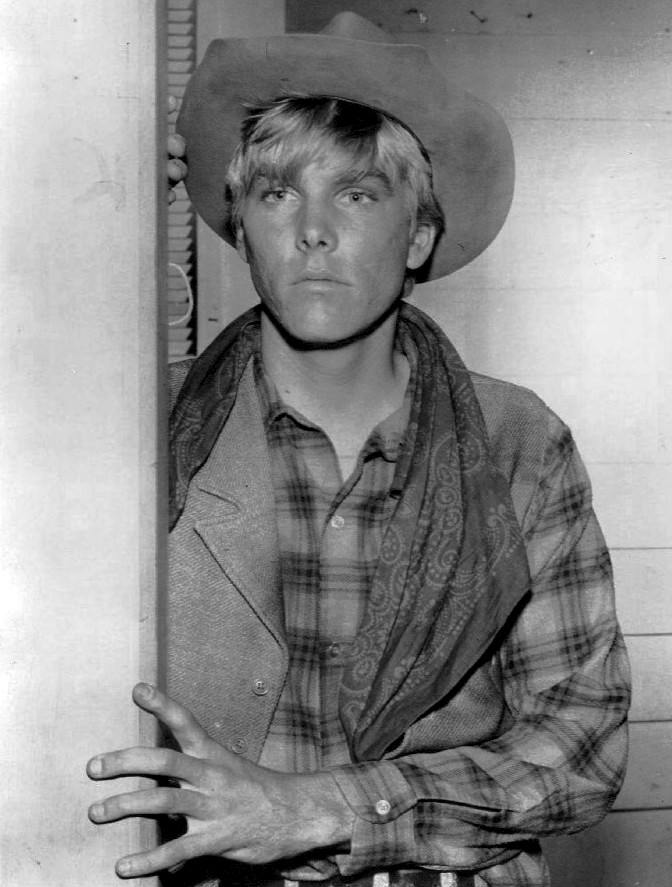
Lancaster's son Bill in The Big Valley, 1967. He later became a screenwriter.

=== Marriages and relationships ===
Lancaster guarded his personal life and attempted to keep it private despite his stardom. He was married three times and had five children.

His first marriage was to June Ernst, a trapeze acrobat. Ernst was the daughter of a renowned female aerialist and an accomplished acrobat herself. After they were married, he performed with her family and her until their separation in the late 1930s. When they divorced is unclear. Contemporary reports listed 1940, but subsequent biographers have suggested dates as late as 1946, delaying his marriage to his second wife.

He met second wife Norma Anderson (1917–1988) when the stenographer substituted for an ill actress in a USO production for the troops in Italy. Reportedly, on seeing Lancaster in the crowd on her way to town from the airport, she turned to an officer and asked, "Who is that good-looking officer and is he married?" The officer set up a blind date between the two for that evening. They married in 1946. Norma was active in political causes with an entire room in their Bel Air home devoted to her major interest, the League of Woman Voters, crammed with printing presses and all the necessary supplies for mass mailings.

She was a life-long member of the NAACP. The couple held a fundraiser for Martin Luther King Jr. and the Southern Christian Leadership Conference ahead of the 1963 March on Washington. All five of his children were with Anderson, including Bill. It was a troubled marriage. The pair separated in 1966, and divorced in 1969.

In 1966, Lancaster began a long-term relationship with hairdresser Jackie Bone, who worked on The Professionals. The relationship was tempestuous, with Bone once smashing a wine bottle over Lancaster's head at a dinner with Sydney Pollack and Peter Falk. Reportedly, they eventually split up after her religious conversion, which Lancaster believed he could not share with her.

His third marriage, to Susan Martin, lasted from September 1990 until his death in 1994.

According to biographer Kate Buford in Burt Lancaster: An American Life, Lancaster was devotedly loyal to his friends and family. Old friends from his childhood remained his friends for life.

==== Possible affairs ====
Some media outlets and authors have written that Lancaster was bisexual, and had relationships with both men and women. Friends said he claimed he was romantically involved with Deborah Kerr during the filming of From Here to Eternity in 1953. However, Kerr stated that while there was a spark of attraction, nothing ever happened. He reportedly had an affair with Joan Blondell.

In her 1980 autobiography, Shelley Winters claimed to have had a two-year affair with him, during which time he was considering separation from his wife. In his Hollywood memoirs, friend Farley Granger recalled an incident when Lancaster and he had to come to Winters' rescue one evening when she had inadvertently overdosed on alcohol and sleeping pills. She broke up with him for "cheating on her with his wife" after she heard reports of his wife's third or fourth pregnancy.

=== Religion ===
Despite his Protestant background and upbringing, Lancaster identified as an atheist later in life.

=== Later years ===
As Lancaster reached his 60s, he began to be affected by cardiovascular disease. In January 1980, he had complications from a routine gall bladder operation (that he barely survived). In 1983, following two minor heart attacks, he underwent an emergency quadruple coronary bypass. He continued to act, however, and to engage in public activism. In 1988, he attended a congressional hearing in Washington, DC, with former colleagues who included James Stewart and Ginger Rogers to protest against media magnate Ted Turner's plan to colorize various black-and-white films from the 1930s and 1940s. On November 30, 1990, when he was 77, a stroke left him partially paralyzed and largely unable to speak, ending his acting career.

== Death ==
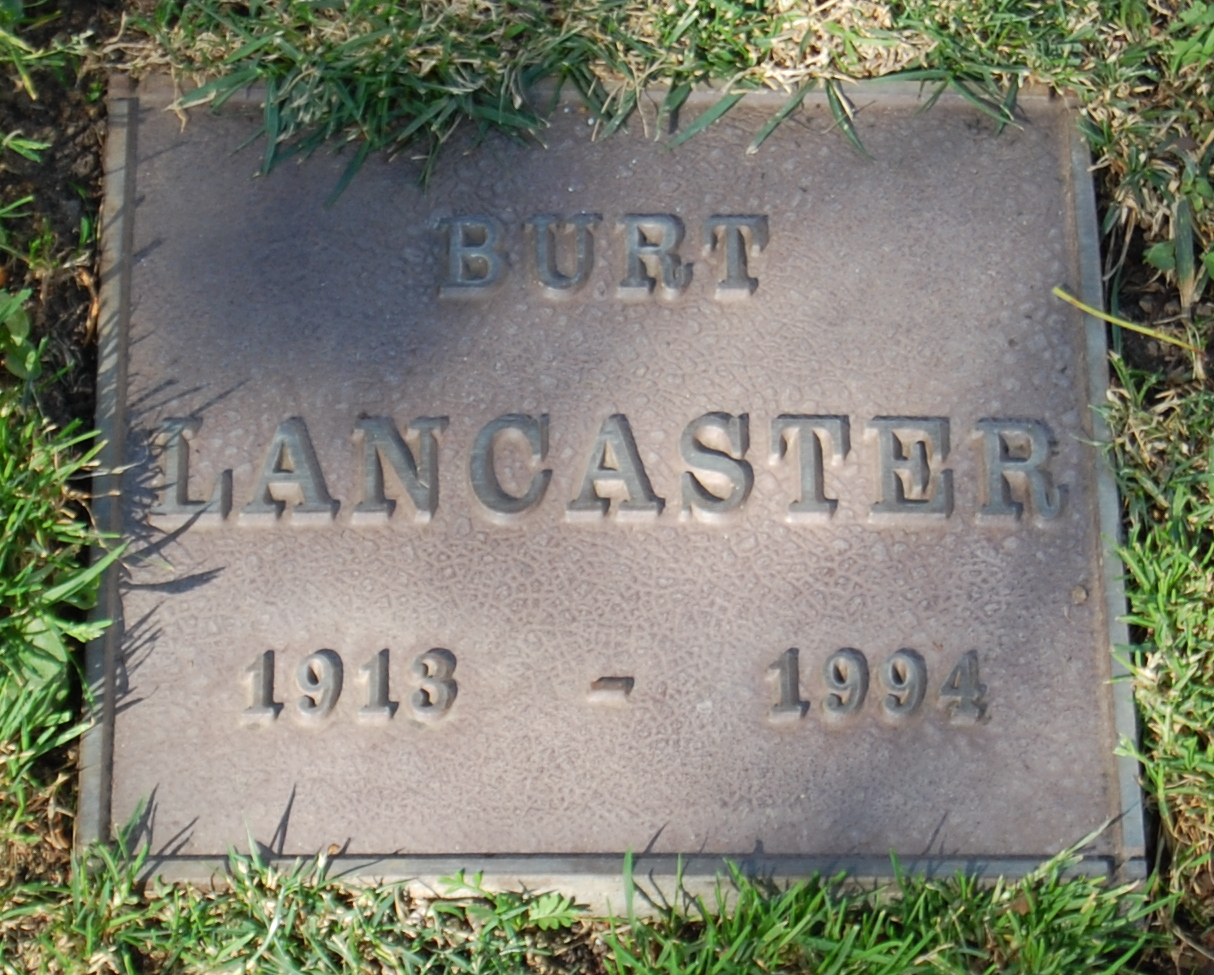
Lancaster's plaque under an oak tree in Westwood Memorial Park where his ashes were scattered

Lancaster died at his apartment in Century City, Los Angeles, after having a third heart attack at 4:50 am on October 20, 1994, age 80. His body was cremated, and his ashes were scattered under a large oak tree in Westwood Memorial Park, which is located in Westwood Village, California. A small, square ground plaque amid several others, inscribed "Burt Lancaster 1913–1994", marks the location. As he had requested, no memorial or funeral service was held for him.

== Legacy ==
The centennial of Lancaster's birth was honored at New York City's Film Society of Lincoln Center in May 2013 with the screening of 12 of the actor's best-known films, from The Killers to Atlantic City.

Lancaster has a star on the Hollywood Walk of Fame, at 6801 Hollywood Boulevard.

In 1999, he was included as the 19th male actor in the list AFI's 100 Years...100 Stars which honored the greatest screen legends of the American film history.

In November 2026, he was recognized as Turner Classic Movies Star of the Month.

== Filmography and awards ==
Lancaster was nominated for the Oscar for Best Actor in a Leading Role in 1954 for From Here to Eternity, in 1961 for Elmer Gantry, in 1964 for Birdman of Alcatraz, and in 1982 for Atlantic City. He won the Oscar in 1961. Lancaster's leading role in Luchino Visconti's 1963 canonical The Leopard began a series of roles with important European art film directors that included roles in Bernardo Bertolucci's 1900 and Louis Malle's Atlantic City as well as Visconti's Conversation Piece.

=== Box office ranking ===
For a number of years exhibitors voted Lancaster among the most popular stars:

Year	US Rank	UK Rank
1950	16th	
1951	25th	
1952	24th	
1953	17th	
1954	13th	7th
1955	16th	
1956	4th	3rd
1957	15th	3rd
1958	20th	
1960	19th	
1961	11th	
1962	10th	

=== In other media ===
Spanish music group Hombres G released an album named La cagaste, Burt Lancaster (You messed up, Burt Lancaster) in 1986.

Thomas Hart Benton painted a scene from The Kentuckian as part of the film's marketing. Lancaster posed for the painting, also known as The Kentuckian.

== See also ==
- List of atheists in film, radio, television and theater
- List of actors with Academy Award nominations
- List of actors with more than one Academy Award nomination in the acting categories
- List of Golden Globe winners
- List of people from Harlem
