= Loring Buzzell =

American music publisher and record label executive

- Born: Loring Bruce Buzzell; October 3, 1927; Long Beach, New York, U.S.
- Died: October 20, 1959 (aged 32); New York City, U.S.
- Resting place: Mount Ararat Cemetery, East Farmingdale, New York
- Education: Colby College (BA)
- Occupations: Music publisher, music executive
- Years active: 1948–1959
- Known for: Calyork Music; Calyork Records; Colby Music; Hecht-Lancaster & Buzzell Music; Leigh Music; Maine Records
- Spouse: Lu Ann Simms (m. 1954–1959)
- Children: 2
- Relatives: Edward Buzzell (uncle); Harold Hecht (brother-in-law)

Loring Bruce Buzzell (October 3, 1927 – October 20, 1959) was an American music publisher and record label executive. Together with film producer Harold Hecht and actor Burt Lancaster, he formed a series of music publishing imprints in the middle and late 1950s. His music publishing companies, Hecht-Lancaster & Buzzell Music, Calyork Music, Leigh Music and Colby Music, were responsible for copyrighting, publishing and promoting the soundtracks and theme songs from such notable films as Marty, Trapeze, The Kentuckian, Sweet Smell of Success, Separate Tables, Cry Tough, Take a Giant Step and The Unforgiven. Buzzell's companies also published "May You Always", the recordings of which by The McGuire Sisters for Coral Records and Joan Regan for His Master's Voice, became the top-selling records and the second-best-selling sheet music in the United States and the United Kingdom for 1959. Calyork Records and Maine Records were two independent record labels operated by Buzzell in partnership with Hecht and Lancaster.

Prior to his association with Hecht and Lancaster, Buzzell managed several Howard Spencer Richmond music publishing imprints, including Hollis Music, Ludlow Music, Folkways Music Publishers, Dartmouth Music and Cromwell Music. While working for Richmond, Buzzell published and promoted such hits as "Early Autumn", written by Woody Herman, Ralph Burns and Johnny Mercer and recorded by Jo Stafford and Paul Weston for Columbia Records, Georgie Auld for Coral Records and Ted Heath and Lita Roza for London Records; "Longing for You", written by Władysław Daniłowski and Bernard Jansen and recorded by Les Baxter for Capitol Records, Teresa Brewer for London Records, George Cates for Coral Records, Larry Clinton for Broadway Records, Vic Damone for Mercury Records, Sammy Kaye for Columbia Records, Russ Morgan for Decca Records and Tommy Tucker for M-G-M Records; "The Thing", written by Charles Randolph Grean and recorded by Phil Harris for RCA-Victor Records; and "A Guy Is a Guy", written by Oscar Brand and recorded by Doris Day for Columbia Records, Ella Fitzgerald for Decca Records and Peggy Taylor for Mercury Records.

Earlier in his career, Buzzell was a contact man for Jack Mills and Irving Mills' music publishing company, Mills Music, and a field man for the performance rights organization the American Society of Composers, Authors and Publishers. Buzzell was married to popular singer Lu Ann Simms, whom he managed towards the end of his life. Buzzell died prematurely at the age of 32 in October 1959 from a heart attack.

== Early life ==
=== Family ===
Loring Bruce Buzzell was born on October 3, 1927, in Long Beach, New York to Samuel Jesse Buzzell (1891–1979) and Alma Virginia Wanner (1896–1974). He was of German, Irish, French and Jewish ancestry. Loring Buzzell had two siblings: an older sister Gloria Joyce Buzzell (born August 3, 1923) and a younger sister Barbara Ann Buzzell (born September 15, 1936). The Buzzell family of five lived in a Victorian house located at 607 Lafayette Boulevard in Long Beach, New York. They had a private tennis court and lived only a few properties away from the waterfront at the north-end of their street.

Buzzell's father Samuel was an important figure in the New York music industry and entertainment community. He graduated from New York University School of Law and was principally known in his profession as a theatrical, music patent and copyright counselor-at-law, and also served as a business incorporation agent. Samuel helped Jack Mills and Irving Mills form their music publishing company, Jack Mills, Inc., in 1919; the company was renamed Mills Music, Inc. in 1921. Samuel was not only the Mills brothers' company attorney, he was also their partner, business manager and secretary of several of their enterprises, including Jack Mills, Inc., Mills Music, Inc., Mills Music Corporation, their agency Mills Artists, Inc., and their British and European division Mills British, Ltd. Samuel was still one of the three company owners and share-holders (along with president Jack Mills and vice-president Irving Mills) when the Mills Music conglomerate was sold in early 1965, leading to his retirement. Some of the artists that were represented by Samuel include Duke Ellington, Cab Calloway, Leroy Anderson, Hoagy Carmichael and Mitchell Parish.

Buzzell's father was also on the board of directors, as President of Long Beach Hospital, from the summer of 1940 until he resigned from the post on November 20, 1941, to focus exclusively on the music business. Buzzell's paternal uncle (Samuel's brother) was Edward Buzzell (1985–1995), a noted stage actor and entertainer who moved to Hollywood and became a film and television director.

Buzzell's older sister Gloria moved to Los Angeles, California in the 1940s and, through her uncle Edward Buzzell, secured employment as an executive assistant in Metro-Goldwyn-Mayer's story department. On November 1, 1947, she married talent agent and film producer Harold Hecht in Las Vegas, Nevada; they had three children. Gloria and Hecht separated on July 18, 1959 and were officially divorced on June 28, 1961. Gloria was married a second time on July 12, 1963, to Franklin M. Desser, an attorney from New York City. She and Desser moved out of Beverly Hills, California and the couple took an apartment on the East Side in New York City.

Buzzell's younger sister Barbara remained in New York and married Eugene S. Stein in 1959. She was married a second time in 1970 to George J. Tamaro, giving birth to a son named Loring Paul Tamaro, named in memory of her brother, on March 26, 1971.

=== Education ===
Buzzell first attended Central School, and later Long Beach Junior Senior High School in Long Beach, New York, before switching to the Cheshire Academy, a college-preparatory school in Cheshire, Connecticut. In 1944, he enrolled at Colby University in Waterville, Maine. "Buzz", as he was quickly nicknamed, played in Colby University's varsity football team, the White Mules, and was known for owning several Ford automobiles. He was an officer of the Alpha Tau Omega, Gamma Alpha Chapter fraternity, a member of the International Relations Club, and on the staff of the school's White Mule magazine. He graduated with the Class of 1948 earning a bachelor's degree in history.

== Career ==
=== ASCAP and Mills Music (1948–1950) ===
After graduating from Colby University in 1948, Buzzell landed a job as a field man for performance rights organization American Society of Composers, Authors and Publishers. In March 1949, he was hired by music publishing company Mills Music, Inc. as a contact man in their professional department. It is likely that his father helped him get the job, since he was an officer in the company. Buzzell worked at Mills Music for about twenty months. Some of his duties while working in the music publishing industry included finding new songs to publish and copyright, signing exclusive song-writing deals with songwriters, securing the recordings of the songs by notable musicians and record labels, and getting the songs out to the public through sheet music.

=== Richmond organization (1950–1955) ===
In late October 1950, Buzzell began working for music publisher Howard Spencer Richmond. The switch from Mills Music to Richmond's organization was a surprise to the press, who were well-acquainted with an ongoing lawsuit between to the two publishers over the public domain composition "Tzena, Tzena, Tzena", emphasized by the fact that Buzzell's father, Samuel Jesse Buzzell, was legally representing the Mills Music company. The lawsuit wound up dragging out until August 1954.

Richmond was well-established in the music business but had only acquired full ownership of his first music publishing company, Cromwell Music, Inc., earlier that year, in February 1950. Cromwell Music, affiliated with ASCAP, had originally been founded in June 1949 by several partners, including lyricist Carl Sigman and disk jockey Gene Rayburn. By the time that Richmond hired Buzzell in October 1950, he was launching his fourth music publishing imprint, Hollis Music, Inc., affiliated with Broadcast Music, Inc. Buzzell was put to work as Professional Manager of Hollis Music, directly under Richmond who was Owner and General Professional Manager. On January 2, 1951, Al Brackman took position as the new General Professional Manager of Hollis Music.

Some of the compositions published and recorded through Hollis Music with Buzzell on staff include "The Thing", written by Charles Randolph Grean and recorded by Phil Harris for RCA-Victor Records; "Don't Cry", written by Edith Piaf, with lyrics translated from French by Eddie Constantine, and recorded by Don Cherry for Decca Records; "The Roving Kind", written by Jessie Cavanaugh and Arnold Stanton and recorded by The Weavers for Decca Records and Guy Mitchell for Columbia Records; "Botch-a-Me", written by Luigi Astore and Riccardo Morbelli, with lyrics translated from Italian by Eddie Y. Stanley, and recorded by Rosemary Clooney for Columbia Records; "Charlie Is My Darling", written by Fred Royal and Wellesley Roberts, and recorded by Lisa Kirk for RCA-Victor Records and Russ Morgan for Decca Records; "Green Acres and Purple Mountains", written by Mack Wolfson and recorded by Gordon MacRae for Capitol Records; and "Until Yesterday", written by Giuseppe Fucilli and William Engvick and recorded by Tony Bennett for Columbia Records.

In January 1951, only four months after joining Richmond's firm, Buzzell was appointed head of exploitation for Richmond's newly renamed imprint Ludlow Music, Inc. (formerly named Spencer Music, Inc.), as well as for Richmond's newly acquired Folkways Music Publishers, Inc. By March 1954, Buzzell had been promoted to General Professional Manager of Ludlow Music. Some of the compositions published and recorded through Ludlow Music and Folkways Music Publishers with Buzzell on staff include "A Guy Is a Guy", written by Oscar Brand and recorded by Doris Day for Columbia Records, Ella Fitzgerald for Decca Records and Peggy Taylor for Mercury Records; "Longing for You", written by Władysław Daniłowski and Bernard Jansen and recorded by Les Baxter for Capitol Records, Teresa Brewer for London Records, George Cates for Coral Records, Larry Clinton for Broadway Records, Vic Damone for Mercury Records, Sammy Kaye for Columbia Records, Russ Morgan for Decca Records and Tommy Tucker for M-G-M Records; "So Long, It's Been Good to Know Yuh", written by Woody Guthrie and recorded by The Weavers for Decca Records; "On Top of Old Smoky", written by Pete Seeger and recorded by The Weavers and Terry Gilkyson for Decca Records and Burl Ives for Columbia Records; "Song of the Dreamer", written by Memphis Evans Curtis and recorded by Eddie Fisher for RCA-Victor Records and Johnnie Ray for Columbia Records; "I Want a Hippopotamus for Christmas", written by John Rox and recorded by Gayla Peevey for Columbia Records; "Oh, That'll be Joyful", written by Jack McVea and Jake Porter and recorded by The Four Lads for Columba Records, Jesse Stone for Atlantic Records, Morey Amsterdam and Francey Lane for M-G-M Records and Bobby Wayne and Gene Baylos for Mercury Records; "Band of Gold", written by Jack Taylor and Bob Musel and recorded by Don Cherry for Columbia Records; "O-Sho-Be-Do-Be", written by Joe Carroll and Billy Graham and recorded by Dizzy Gillespie for Dee-Gee Records; and "My Girl", written by Charles Freed and recorded by Frank Sinatra for Columbia Records and Tommy Edwards for M-G-M Records.

In March 1951, Richmond formed another imprint, Dartmouth Music, Inc. mainly for the purpose of accommodating foreign compositions to be published in the United States. Dartmouth was eventually linked to ASCAP in July 1951 and Richmond installed Buzzell as Professional Manager of the company. By March 1952, Buzzell had been promoted to General Professional Manager of Dartmouth Music. Some of the compositions published and recorded through Dartmouth Music with Buzzell on staff include "Christmas Roses", written by Joan Whitney, Alex Kramer and Hy Zaret and recorded by Jo Stafford and Frankie Lane for Columbia Records; "Swedish Rhapsody", written by Hugo Alfvén and recorded by Percy Faith for Columbia Records; "This Too Shall Pass", written by Ervin Drake and Jimmy Shirl and recorded by Doris Day for Columbia Records; "Nearer My Love to Me", written by Ervin Drake and Jimmy Shirl and recorded by Jo Stafford for Columbia Records; "I'm the King of Broken Hearts", written by Fred Tobias and Jerry Tobias and recorded by Tony Bennett for Columbia Records; and the theme song of the film I Am a Camera, "Why Do I?", written by Ralph Siegel and Carl Sigman.

By July 1952, Buzzell had been named Professional Manager of Cromwell Music, Inc. and by September 1952, he was already promoted to General Professional Manager of the same imprint. Some of the compositions published and recorded through Cromwell Music with Buzzell on staff include "Early Autumn", written by Woody Herman, Ralph Burns and Johnny Mercer and recorded by Jo Stafford and Paul Weston for Columbia Records, Woody Herman for Mars Records, Georgie Auld for Coral Records and Ted Heath and Lita Roza for London Records; "I Believe", written by Ervin Drake, Irvin Graham, Jimmy Shirl and Al Stillman and recorded by Jane Froman for Capitol Records and Frankie Lane for Columbia Records; "Carolina Moon", written by Joe Burke and Benny Davis; "Honky Tonk Sweetheart", written by Carmen Lombardo and Sonny Clapp and recorded by Guy Lombardo for Decca Records; and the soundtrack to Indiscretion of an American Wife, composed by Alessandro Cicognini and released as a 10" vinyl LP by Columbia Records.

Buzzell also scooped a major signing when he inked his brother-in-law Harold Hecht's film production company, Hecht-Lancaster Productions, to a soundtrack publishing deal with Cromwell Music in December 1954. At the time, Hecht-Lancaster Productions, a subsidiary of Harold Hecht and Burt Lancaster's Norma Productions, was the largest and most successful independent film production company in Hollywood. Cromwell Music published the soundtrack and theme songs to Hecht-Lancaster Productions' 1955 film Marty, which went on to win an Academy Award for Best Picture. The film's first theme song, "Hey, Marty", was written by Harry Warren and Paddy Chayefsky and was recorded by The Naturals for M-G-M Records and The Chappaqua High School Kids for Columbia Records. Marty's second theme song, "Saturday Night Mambo", was written by Roy Webb (the film's score composer) and recorded by the Dave "Tico" Robbins Quintette for M-G-M Records and Les Brown for Coral Records. Hecht-Lancaster Productions' next film soundtrack, for The Kentuckian, was composed by Bernard Herrmann and originally published through Frank Loesser's music publishing company, Frank Music, Inc. Richmond later picked up the copyright renewals and re-issues of the soundtrack were published through Cromwell Music.

=== Managing Lu Ann Simms (1954–1959) ===
In October 1955, after exactly five years of working for Richmond, Buzzell left the music publishing firms to manage his wife Simms. Buzzell had slowly begun to manage his wife's business affairs in late 1954, helping with the promotion of her Columbia Records releases. During her maternity leave and pregnancy, from March to October 1955, he handled all of her music-related affairs, and when her doctor gave her the go-ahead to return to work, after the birth of their first daughter Cynthia, Buzzell decided to take up the position full-time.

Simms was still signed to her five-year recording contract with Columbia Records when Buzzell became her manager. Once that contract expired in 1957, he negotiated for her a three-year recording contract with Jubilee Records. Jubilee Records released Simms' sole LP, At Separate Tables, as well as six 45s and an EP.

=== Hecht-Lancaster & Buzzell companies (1956–1959) ===
In the spring of 1956, Buzzell reunited with his brother-in-law, Harold Hecht, to discuss the score publishing of Hecht-Lancaster Productions' new film Trapeze. It is likely that had Buzzell still been employed by Howard S. Richmond, Hecht-Lancaster Productions' future film soundtracks would have continued to be solely published through Cromwell Music, under the existing agreement. However, Hecht and Lancaster were trying to gain more independence and enjoyed the freedom of having their own companies.

The press announced in June 1956 that Hecht, Lancaster and Buzzell had formed a new music publishing company named Leigh Music, Inc., tied to ASCAP. The company was named after Buzzell's daughter, Cynthia Leigh Buzzell, a trend well-used in the Hecht and Lancaster company structure. The partners would name several of their film production imprints after their own children: Hecht's Alma Productions, Steven Productions and Jeffrey Productions, and Lancaster's Norma Productions (after his wife), James Productions, Joanna Productions, Sheila Productions, Susan Productions and William Enterprises. The instrumental score to Trapeze, composed by Malcolm Arnold, had already been copyrighted and published earlier that month, solely through the established Cromwell Music deal, as Leigh Music had not yet been set up and equipped to handle the proper exploitation. The recording of the score, conducted by Muir Mathieson, was the first Hecht-Lancaster Productions / Norma Productions film to have a soundtrack LP, released by Columbia Records in early June 1956. Columbia Records also issued a 45 single that same month, with the songs "Lola's Theme" and "Mike and Lola's Love Theme", taken straight from the LP. In July 1956, "Lola's Theme" was released on two more 45 singles; one from a recording by Steve Allen's orchestra for Coral Records, the other from a recording by Ralph Marterie's orchestra for Mercury Records.

Leigh Music's proper debut was the co-publishing (with Cromwell Music) and copyrighting of an adaptation of the film's theme song, "Trapeze", composed by Paul Elie with lyrics by Johnny Burke, dated July 6, 1956. When the company filed the paperwork for their second publishing, on August 24, 1956, for a new version of Arnold's "Lola's Theme" with lyrics by Al Stillman, Leigh Music, Inc.'s name had been quietly changed to Hecht-Lancaster & Buzzell Music, Inc. Leigh Music and Hecht-Lancaster & Buzzell Music setup its office at 151 West 46th Street in New York City, where the Richmond companies were also based.

Hecht-Lancaster & Buzzell Music remained relatively quiet for the next six months. It was not until a press release went out in March 1957 that Leigh Music's new name, Hecht-Lancaster & Buzzell Music, was announced to the public, along with news of the creation of their second imprint, Calyork Music, Inc., to be tied with BMI. Two months before, Hecht-Lancaster Productions had officially been renamed Hecht-Hill-Lancaster Productions, welcoming screenwriter and producer James Hill as a partner; Hill was nevertheless not included in the pair's music industry ventures. The music companies setup their new offices at 729 7th Avenue in New York City, where several companies linked to Hecht-Hill-Lancaster Productions were also headquartered; United Artists, which was exclusively financing and distributing all Hecht-Hill-Lancaster Productions films, took up six floors in the building, which included their United Artists Television and United Artists Records divisions. Bernard M. Kamber, Hecht-Hill-Lancaster Productions' New York Office Executive Assistant, Director of Public Relations, and National Director of Advertising and Publicity, also had an office in the building.

Without Richmond and Cromwell Music, Buzzell took charge of nearly everything related to Hecht-Lancaster & Buzzell Music and Calyork Music. The next order of business, in early 1957, was the copyrighting and publishing of The Bachelor Party's score, Hecht-Hill-Lancaster Productions' new film. The score was composed by Alex North and published by Hecht-Lancaster & Buzzell Music. RCA-Victor Records issued a 45 single featuring "Theme from The Bachelor Party" in April 1957.

Buzzell next took care of the music from Sweet Smell of Success, a film co-produced by Hecht-Hill-Lancaster Productions and Curtleigh Productions (Tony Curtis and Janet Leigh's film production company). The film fared poorly at the box office when initially released, but later became a cult classic. The film's soundtrack, however, was immediately well-received and was a landmark in the soundtrack industry; it was the first film to have two separate soundtracks, each featuring completely different music. All of the music from Sweet Smell of Success was published and copyrighted by Calyork Music, Hecht-Hill-Lancaster Productions' only film soundtrack to be affiliated with BMI, and was released through a promotional tie-in with Decca Records in June 1957. The first soundtrack LP featured the jazz score composed by Elmer Bernstein, while the second soundtrack LP featured the music composed and performed by the Chico Hamilton Quintet, a band which appears in the film. Decca Records also issued two 45s in promotion of the LPs: the first featured the songs "The Street" and "Toots Shor's Blues", taken straight from Bernstein's soundtrack; the second featured the song "Goodbye Baby", composed by Chico Hamilton and Fred Katz, with lyrics by William Engvick, and recorded by Mark Murphy.

Hecht-Hill-Lancaster Productions' next film soundtrack, Run Silent, Dun Deep, was composed by Franz Waxman and published by Hecht-Lancaster & Buzzell Music. A tie-in theme song (not featured in the film) was composed by Kenny Jacobson and recorded by Jack Pleis and his orchestra for release by Decca Records in April 1958. Also in 1958, Buzzell published one of Hecht-Lancaster & Buzzell Music's most successful songs, "Separate Tables", written by Harry Warren and Harold Adamson and tied to Hecht-Hill-Lancaster Productions' film Separate Tables. This one did appear in the film, alongside David Raksin's score, the latter of which was nominated for an Academy Award for Best Music, Scoring of a Dramatic or Comedy Picture at the 31st Academy Awards ceremony on April 6, 1959. Recordings of Warren and Adamson's title song were made by Vic Damone (which became Damone's best-selling record), Victor Silvester, and Jacqueline Boyer, all three for Columbia Records, Eydie Gormé for ABC-Paramount Records, Mantovani for London Records, Lilian Terry for Compagnia Generale del Disco, The Clebanoff Strings for Mercury Records, Len Mercer for Discografica Editrice Tirrena, the Everest Concert Orchestra for Everest Records, Golden Guinea Strings for Pye Records, and Lu Ann Simms for Jubilee Records. Simms also titled her sole full-length album At Separate Tables.

Another successful soundtrack album published by Hecht-Lancaster & Buzzell Music was Cry Tough, a Hecht-Hill-Lancaster Productions subsidiary picture, produced through Cannon Productions and Anne Productions. The score was composed and performed by Brazilian guitarist Laurindo Almeida and received a twelve-song LP treatment from Capitol Records in November 1959, under the title Happy Cha Cha Cha. Jack Marshall composed the soundtrack to two Hecht-Hill-Lancaster Productions' films, The Rabbit Trap and Take a Giant Step, both published through Hecht-Lancaster & Buzzell Music. The latter had a theme song written by Jay Livingston and Ray Evans, which was performed by the film's star Johnny Nash for an ABC-Paramount Records 45 single. Hecht-Lancaster & Buzzell Music also published and copyrighted the film scores from Hecht-Hill-Lancaster Proprietary Limited's Summer of the Seventeenth Doll, composed by Benjamin Frankel, and Hecht-Hill Lancaster Films' The Devil's Disciple (co-produced by Kirk Duglas' Brynaprod), composed by Richard Rodney Bennett; neither soundtrack received general releases outside the film.

The final film score which Buzzell worked on prior to his death was Hecht-Hill-Lancaster Productions' last movie, The Unforgiven. Because the film was released six months after his passing, the publishing and copyrights were done through Hecht & Buzzell Music, which was overseen by Lu Ann Simms. The film's score was composed by Dimitri Tiomkin and given an LP treatment by United Artists Records in March 1960. A theme song, "The Unforgiven – The Need for Love", was composed by Tiomkin with lyrics by Ned Washington and was very successful with many recordings by popular artists. It was recorded by Don Costa, Tito Rodríguez and Roy Liberto, all three for United Artists Records, The McGuire Sisters for Coral Records, Clyde Otis for Mercury Records, Ronnie Hilton and Gloria Lasso, both for His Master's Voice, The Wally Stott Orchestra And Chorus for Pye Records, Ron Goodwin and His Orchestra for Parlophone Records, Jackie Gleason for Capitol Records, Earl Bostic and Leon Pops Orchestra, both for King Records, Franck Pourcel for Pathé, Robert Jeantal and Michel Clement, both for Philips Records, François Deguelt, Max Jaffa and Norrie Paramor, both for Columbia Records, Helmut Zacharias for Polydor Records, The Clebanoff Strings for Mercury Records, Petula Clark for Disques Vogue, Frank Chacksfield for Ace of Clubs Records, Lew Douglas for Carlton Records, The Medallion Strings for Medallion Records, Jesse Crawford for Decca Records, and Gino Mescoli for Vesuvius Records. Costa's version peaked to number 27 on Billboard's Hot 100 chart on July 4, 1960, and was number 22 on Billboard's Honor Roll of Hits chart on July 11, 1960.

Buzzell originally negotiated a licensing deal with Howard S. Richmond's company Essex Music, Ltd. to handle the Hecht and Lancaster soundtracks, as well as other Hecht-Lancaster & Buzzell Music compositions in the United Kingdom. But by 1959, he had set up his own imprint, Colby Music, Ltd. The new company was named after Buzzell's alma mater, Colby University. After Buzzell's death, Simms renamed Hecht-Lancaster & Buzzell Music, Inc. to Hecht & Buzzell Music, Inc., in 1960, and then again later, in 1965, to Colby Music, Inc. Calyork Music, Inc. did not change name.

Some of the non film-related compositions that Buzzell published and had recorded through Calyork Music include fifteen songs composed by jazz pianist Anthony Tamburello, most of which were recorded and released on the Everest Records LP Music Tailored To Your Taste... in January 1959, five songs written by Steve Karmen, two of which were recorded by Karmen for the Mercury Records 45 single "Watchin' and Walkin'" / "Oh! Oh!" in November 1958, "Just About", written by Don Marsh and Nancy Lee March and recorded by Lu Ann Simms for Jubilee Records, "Who Can I Believe", written by Vance Packard, "Chum-Bam-Bele", written by Fred Elton and Clint Ballard Jr. and recorded by Enid Mosier for Decca Records, and "Anxiously Waiting" and "She Flipped Me", written by Lou Bartel and recorded by The Flipteens for Calyork Records – Hecht, Lancaster and Buzzell's own independent record label. Calyork Records was briefly operated by the team as a way to shop releases hoping to get picked up for repress by major record labels. The records were manufactured in-house by United Artists Records, located in the same building.

The most notable non film-related compositions that Buzzell published and had recorded through Hecht-Lancaster & Buzzell Music was "May You Always", in the fall of 1958, composed by Dick Charles with lyrics by Larry Markes. It was first recorded by The McGuire Sisters, who were close friends of Buzzell and Simms, for Coral Records, and Joan Regan for His Master's Voice. The McGuire Sisters' version peaked to number 11 on Billboard's Hot 100 chart on January 26, 1959, number 15 on the UK Singles chart on July 5, 1959, and became the best-selling record of 1959, while the Joan Regan version peaked to number 9 on the UK Singles chart on July 5, 1959. The song also became the second-best-selling sheet music in the United States and a top ten best-seller sheet music in Britain for 1959. Other artists who have recorded the song include Vince Hill and Ken Dodd, both for EMI, The Kays for Gala Records, Barbara Cook for DRG Records, John Warren, Joe "Mr Piano" Henderson and The Jean-Ettes, all for Pye Records, Maureen Evans for Embassy Records, Carol Williams for Melcot Music, Anita Bryant for Columbia Records, Tammy Jones and Bobby Vinton, both for Epic Records, Page Morton for M-G-M Records, Dave Garroway and Sandy Stewart for Dick Charles Recording, Harry Harrison for Amy Records, The Gatlin Brother for Branson Entertainment, Eddy Arnold for RCA-Victor Records, Ian McNabb for This Way Up, The Mills Brothers for Dot Records, Johnny Gilbert for Janel Records, Deep River Boys for Fontana Records, Jack Scott for Jade Records, and Dorothy Squires for Esban Records. Charles and Markes later composed the song "After" especially for Lu Ann Simms, who recorded it for Jubilee Records.

Hecht-Lancaster & Buzzell Music also had a fruitful collaboration with songwriters Kenny Jacobson and Rhoda Roberts, from whom they published and copyrighted over thirty songs. Some of these included "Just for Two" and "Somebody Loses, Somebody Wins", both recorded by Jaye P. Morgan for M-G-M Records, "Run, Don't Walk", "The Mooch" and "Bye Um Bye", all three recorded by Lu Ann Simms for Columbia Records and Jubilee Records, "Baby, Je Vous Aime", "Crazy Dreamer", "That's All That Matters" and "The Wonder of It All", all four recorded by Bobby Miller for Jubilee Records and Apollo Records, "Midnight Blue" and "This Could Be the Night", both recorded by Herb Corey for Top Rank Records, "Easy Does It", recorded by Johnny Mathis for Columbia Records, "I'll Be Waitin'", recorded by Kenny Rankin for Decca Records, "Didja Mean Whatcha Said?", recorded by Steve Karmen for Mercury Records, "Made for Each Other", recorded by Don Rondo for Jubilee Records, "Lovable", recorded by Jill Corey for Columbia Records, "Have Another", recorded by Lou Monte for RCA-Victor Records, "Bye Um Bye" recorded by Margaret Imlau for Decca Records, "This Could be the Night", recorded by The Arena Twins for Kapp Records, and "Cafe of Blue Mirrors" and "Ragamuffin's Holiday", both recorded by Ken Colby for Maine Records – another of Hecht, Lancaster and Buzzell's independent record labels. Maine Records, sometimes credited as Maine Record Company, was named after the State of Maine, where Buzzell attended university. Records released by Maine Records were manufactured and distributed by Jubilee Records.

Other notable songs that Buzzell published through his company include "The Way I Am", written by Gloria Shayne and recorded by Tommy Sands for Capitol Records, four songs co-written by Lu Ann Simms and Jay P. Morgan: "I Care", "If Something's Gonna Happen Let It Happen", "Love Has Gone" and "Somewhere There's a Rainbow", half a dozen songs written by Fred Elton, including "Smile for the People", recorded by Lillian Briggs for Coral Records, and "Good Time Charlie", recorded by The Ja Da Quartte for Warner Bros. Records, "Green Silk Pajamas", written by Joe Marsala and Guy Wood and "Motherless Child", written by Jerry Fielding.

== Personal life ==
=== Marriage to Lu Ann Simms ===
Buzzell first met Lu Ann Simms (née Lucille Ann Ciminelli on July 11, 1932) in late 1952, after being introduced by a mutual friend in the hallway of a production studio. About six months earlier, on April 21, 1952, Simms, a department store music counter sales girl from Rochester, New York, had won a singing contest on Arthur Godfrey's radio and television program Arthur Godfrey's Talent Scouts. She was quickly signed to a seven-year contract with Columbia Broadcasting System for television, radio and their record label division Columbia Records. Buzzell and Simms met just when Columbia Records was releasing her first single in September 1952, featuring the songs "When It's Just About September" and "Puppy Love", and she began appearing as a regular on Godfrey's radio and television programs on CBS every week.

The two of them originally exchanged casual pleasantries but it was not until the winter of 1953 that an interest of attraction sparked. Simms mentioned wanting to see Broadway's new play Kismet at the Ziegfeld Theatre and Buzzell showed up a few days later with a pair of tickets. The couple became engaged on Easter Sunday, April 18, 1954, and were hoping for a simple, quiet wedding at St. Sebastian Roman Catholic Church in New York City. The following day, April 19, 1954, after Simms had appeared on her weekday morning show, Arthur Godfrey Time, she and Buzzell drove out to Coney Island to have their Monday afternoon lunch – hot dogs at Nathan's Famous. They then spent the rest of the evening together driving around the country. Meanwhile, the news of their engagement was revealed to the public by Godfrey on his Monday night program, Arthur Godfrey's Talent Scouts, a coast-to-coast program broadcast on both radio and television. Buzzell and Simms were bombarded with phone calls, telegrams and letters from fans congratulating them, and by April 20, 1954, every newspaper in the country was carrying the news.

The wedding took place on July 24, 1954, from 11 to 11:15 A.M., at St. Raphael's Church in New York City with Franciscan Father Reverend Robert Perrella performing the ceremony. Although Buzzell was Jewish, the wedding ceremony was held in Catholic faith in order to please the Italian-American Ciminelli family. 1,500 friends and relatives overfilled the church, with such notable guests as Merv Griffin, The McGuire Sisters and Frank Parker. Griffin later claimed in interviews that he was best-man at the couple's wedding, but he was in fact one of the four ushers; the best man was Buzzell's childhood friend Alan Peppe, while Griffin ushered with Buzzell's other friend Frank Rohr and Simms' brothers Donald and John Ciminelli. The maid of honor was Buzzell's sister Barbara Ann. Buzzell and Simms' wedding was highly publicized, with newspaper, radio and television coverage spanning roughly three weeks, from the week prior to the week following. The event was so anticipated by fans, who gathered to fill the street, that a police detail was called to keep the crowds back from the church and allow the married couple's limousine to drive away after the ceremony. The wedding was professionally photographed in 3-D color pictures by Norman Shaver and Glenn Conrad of the Shaver Photography Studio. The newlyweds delayed their honeymoon to Hawaii until September 1954 in order to accommodate Simms' appearances on Godfrey's program.

=== Children ===
Buzzell and Simms had two children: Cynthia "Cindy" Leigh Buzzell (born September 11, 1955) and Lauren Beth Buzzell (born January 14, 1960).

When Simms announced the expectancy of her first child in January 1955, the news was immediately picked up by newspapers, radio stations and television broadcasts from coast to coast. She went on maternity leave from the Godfrey show in March 1955, planning to return by the end of the year. In September 1955, when Cynthia was born at the Doctors Hospital in New York City, pictures and news of the parents and baby were again circulated everywhere. Merv Griffin was appointed Cynthia's godfather. In the late 1970s, Cynthia married Geoffrey Charles Kielas.

Lauren was also born at the Doctors Hospital in New York City, but three months after Buzzell's death. Her birth was also covered by the media from coast to coast. Lauren died at 24 years, on January 6, 1985. The funeral services were held on January 8, 1985, at the Westwood Village Mortuary Chapel in Westwood, Los Angeles, California. Lauren was cremated and her ashes are held in a columbarium at Westwood Memorial Park; Simms' ashes were later rested in the same plot.

=== Friendship with Merv Griffin ===
In the summer of 1954, Buzzell became acquainted with singer and actor Merv Griffin. Griffin had been living in California for several years but decided to spend the summer of 1954 in New York City. He landed a job as the host of a television show titled Summer Holiday for CBS-TV; a summer replacement for Jane Froman's U.S.A. Canteen and Jo Stafford's The Jo Stafford Show. Griffin needed a place to stay and wound up moving in with Buzzell as his new roommate. The two had a lot in common and became instant friends, and Buzzell introduced Griffin to all of New York City's popular musicians and music executives. Griffin also co-wrote the song "Hot-Cha-Cha" with Sydney Shaw, and had it published via Dartmouth Music, where Buzzell was General Manager. Griffin recorded the song and it was released as a single by Columbia Records in early 1955.

Buzzell was already engaged to Lu Ann Simms at the time he met Griffin, with a wedding date set for July 24, 1954. Griffin later claimed in interviews that he was best man at their wedding, but was in fact one of the four ushers. After the wedding (roughly two months following his arrival in the city), Griffin moved into a different apartment in the same building so that Simms could move in with Buzzell; he remained life-long friends with the couple. When the couple had their first child, Cynthia Leigh Buzzell, born September 11, 1955, Griffin was named her godfather. Griffin later recorded the song "You're the Prettiest Thing" (written by Sydney Shaw and Jane Douglas White) in 1958, which was published by Hecht-Lancaster & Buzzell Music, and was released as a single by Decca Records.

=== Death ===
Buzzell had been complaining of chest pains but assumed that they were due to a stomach ulcer, for which he had been hospitalized two years prior. He awoke just before dawn on the morning of October 20, 1959, in severe pain, whereupon Simms called his physician. Buzzell died in his Manhattan apartment from a myocardial infarction at 5 A.M. that day, only two weeks after his 32nd birthday. Newspapers erroneously reported that he was 37 years old in that day's news, but later obituaries carried his correct age (32).

The funeral services were held on October 22, 1959, at the Universal Funeral Chapel in New York City. Although he was married in a Catholic ceremony, Buzzell was interred in his family plot at the Jewish Mount Ararat Cemetery in East Farmingdale, New York. Simms continued looking after Buzzell's music publishing companies after his death. Calyork Music, Inc. and Colby Music, Ltd. remained intact but Simms renamed Hecht-Lancaster & Buzzell Music, Inc. to Hecht & Buzzell Music, Inc., and later to Colby Music, Inc.

Buzzell was survived by his mother, Alma Virginia Wanner, who died at 78 years on November 27, 1974, and his father, Samuel Jesse Buzzell, who died at 87 years on July 9, 1979. His second daughter, Lauren Beth Buzzell, died at 24 years, a week before her 25th birthday, on January 6, 1985. His widow, Lu Ann Simms, remarried on October 15, 1961, to Casper Stolt, a liquor salesman from Rochester, New York, and later died at 71 years on September 21, 2003. His older sister, Gloria Joyce Buzzell Hecht Desser, died at 82 years on December 12, 2004, while his younger sister, Barbara Ann Buzzell Stein Tamaro, died at 82 years on May 16, 2019.
