= Soldier's show =

Theatrical presentation designed by the United States Army's Special Services Division

A soldier's show or blueprint special was a theatrical presentation designed by the United States Army's Special Services Division for the purpose of team building and improving morale for soldiers during World War II. According to Arthur Loesser, brother to songwriter Frank Loesser, blueprint specials were the brainchild of Harry Salter, orchestra conductor for 1920s and 1930s radio programs and the inventor of Name That Tune.

Often written by Tin Pan Alley songwriters and radio comedy writers, the soldier's shows were pre-packaged musical reviews distributed to local army camps, complete with orchestral arrangements, scripts for skits and jokes, stage directions, costume designs, scenery diagrams "all pre-cooked and provided with directions for serving." As opposed to USO Camp shows, often presented by professionals and special services entertainment units, the blueprint special was designed so that the local soldiers themselves built the scenery, cobbled together costumes, played the instruments and performed for each other.

Hi, Yank! by Frank Loesser and Pvt. Arnold M. Auerbach with dances by Pvt. Jose Limon is an example of a popular 1944 blueprint special. Loesser and Auerbach assisted Captain Ruby Jane Douglas mount an all-Women's Army Corps show entitled P.F.C. Mary Brown, based on Loesser's previous wartime hit First Class Private Mary Brown from the review "About Face".

While visiting North Africa, Dwight D. Eisenhower went backstage and praised the performers: "You are entertaining soldiers. You are not fighting with guns - but your job is just as important. As long as you are doing your job well . . . you will be rendering a service, and a great one, to your fellow soldiers and your country"

In 2017, director Tom Ridgely adapted works from four soldier's shows into a limited run showing of "Blueprint Specials", performed in New York City at the Intrepid Sea, Air & Space Museum.
