= List of awards and nominations received by Anne Murray =

The following is a list of awards won by country-pop singer Anne Murray. Anne Murray is the winner of four Grammy Awards (including one in the pop category), three CMA Awards, and also has countless Juno Awards, American Music Awards, etc.

== Awards by year ==
=== 1971 ===
- RPM Awards - Best Produced Single: "Snowbird"
- RPM Awards - Best Produced MOR Album: Honey, Wheat & Laughter

=== 1972 ===
- RPM Awards - Female Vocalist of the Year
- RPM Awards - Best Produced MOR Album: Talk It Over in the Morning

=== 1973 ===
- RPM Awards - Female Vocalist of the Year
- RPM Awards - Best Produced MOR Album: Brian Ahern: Annie
- ACTRA Award - Best Variety Performance: Straight, Clean and Simple

=== 1974 ===
- RPM Awards - Female Vocalist of the Year
- RPM Awards - Pop Music Album of the Year: Danny's Song
- Grammy Award - Best Female Country Vocal Performance: "Love Song"
- Country Music Association of Great Britain Awards - Country Female Vocalist of the Year

=== 1975 ===
- Juno Award - Female Vocalist of the Year
- Juno Award - Country Female Vocalist of the Year

=== 1976 ===
- Juno Award - Country Female Vocalist of the Year

=== 1978 ===
- Grammy Award - Best Female Pop Vocal: "You Needed Me"
- Academy of Country Music - Song of the Year: "You Needed Me"

=== 1979 ===
- Juno Award - Female Vocalist of the Year
- Juno Award - Children's Album of the Year: There's a Hippo in My Tub
- Juno Award - Recording Engineer: Let's Keep It That Way
- RPM Big Country Awards - Top Country Female Singer
- RPM Big Country Awards - Canadian Country Artist of the Year

=== 1980 ===
- Grammy Award - Best Female Country Vocal Performance: "Could I Have This Dance"
- Juno Award - Female Vocalist of the Year
- Juno Award - Country Female Vocalist of the Year
- Juno Award - Album of the Year: New Kind of Feeling
- Juno Award - Single of the Year: "I Just Fall in Love Again"
- RPM Big Country Awards - Best Country Album: I'll Always Love You

=== 1981 ===
- Juno Award - Female Vocalist of the Year
- Juno Award - Country Female Vocalist of the Year
- Juno Award - Album of the Year: Greatest Hits
- Juno Award - Single of the Year: "Could I Have This Dance"

=== 1982 ===
- American Music Awards - Female Country Singer
- Juno Award - Female Vocalist of the Year
- Juno Award - Country Female Vocalist of the Year

=== 1983 ===
- Grammy Award - Best Female Country Vocal Performance: "A Little Good News"
- Juno Award - Country Female Vocalist of the Year

=== 1984 ===
- Juno Award - Country Female Vocalist of the Year
- Canadian Country Music Association - Single of the Year: "A Little Good News"
- Country Music Association - Single of the Year: "A Little Good News"
- Country Music Association - Album of the Year: A Little Good News

=== 1985 ===
- American Music Awards - Favorite Country Video Single: "A Little Good News"
- American Music Awards - Favorite Country Female Video Artist
- Juno Award - Country Female Vocalist of the Year
- Country Music Association - Vocal Duo of the Year: Anne Murray and Dave Loggins
- RPM Big Country Awards - Top Country Female Vocalist
- RPM Big Country Awards - Best Country Single: "Nobody Loves Me Like You Do" (with Dave Loggins)

=== 1986 ===
- Juno Award - Country Female Vocalist of the Year
- Canadian Country Music Association - Single of the Year: "Now and Forever (You and Me)"
- Canadian Country Music Association - Song of the Year: "Now and Forever (You and Me)"
- RPM Big Country Awards - Top Country Female Vocalist

=== 1987 ===
- RPM Big Country Awards - Top Country Female Vocalist
- RPM Big Country Awards - Best Country Single: "Now and Forever (You and Me)"

=== 1988 ===
- RPM Big Country Awards - Top Country Female Vocalist

=== 1990 ===
- East Coast Music Awards - Video of the Year: "If I Ever Fall in Love Again" (with Kenny Rogers)

=== 1993 ===
- Gemini Awards - Best Performance in a Variety Show: Country Gold

=== 2025 ===
- Juno Awards - Lifetime Achievement Award

== Other achievements ==
- 1975 - Officer of the Order of Canada
- 1975 - Country Music Hall of Fame Walkway of Stars
- 1976 - Honorary Doctor of Letters from University of New Brunswick
- 1978 - Honorary Doctor of Letters from Saint Mary's University
- 1980 - Star on the Hollywood Walk of Fame at 1750 Vine Street
- 1984 - Companion Of The Order Of Canada
- 1993 - Induction into the Canadian Music Hall of Fame
- 1995 - Governor General's Performing Arts Award
- 1997 - Canadian Association of Broadcasters Hall of Fame Award
- 1998 - Star on Canada's Walk of Fame
- 2001 - East Coast Music Association Director's Special Achievement Award
- 2002 - Induction into the Canadian Country Music Association Hall of Fame
- 2002 - Awarded the Order of Nova Scotia
- 2002 - Honorary Canadian Tourism Ambassador
- 2002 - Resorts' Entrance to the Stars on the Boardwalk, Atlantic City, NJ
- 2002 - Ranked #24 on CMT's 40 Greatest Women in Country Music
- 2006 - Canadian Songwriters Hall of Fame Award
- 2007 - Likeness of Anne Murray featured on Canada Post stamp
- 2008 - Howie Richmond Hitmaker Award
- 2009 - Honorary degree from the University of Prince Edward Island.
- 2025 - Juno award Lifetime achievement award
