= Song of the Women's Army Corps =

United States Army marching song

The "Song of the Women's Army Corps" is a United States Army marching song written by Jane Douglass White, (Note: At the time of the original composition, White was as yet unmarried, and copyrighted the song as Ruby Jane Douglass.) with lyrics by White and fellow soldier Camilla Mays Frank. Originally written during World War II as "The WAAC is in Back of You" by White before her induction into the service, the song's lyrics were adapted later by White and Frank to better reflect post-war women's army service, and was adopted by the Women's Army Corps (Note: The Women's Army Corps was originally created in May 1942 as an auxiliary corps (WAAC) and was incorporated fully into army active service (WAC) on 1 July, 1943. This article will use the abbreviation WAAC to refer to the auxiliary before 1 July 1943 and use the abbreviation WAC to refer to the corps after that date.) as its official song in 1951.

== "The WAAC is in Back of You" ==
Bristow, Oklahoma schools vocal music supervisor Ruby Jane Douglass was driving from the U.S. Army recruiting center in Oklahoma City in August 1942. According to Douglass, the clicking of the car's tires against the road surface made a rhythmic martial marching sound, like a song. Inspired by her induction into the new Women's Army Auxiliary Corps that day, when Douglass got home that evening, she wrote the song.

== "The WAC is a Soldier Too" ==
As a newly promoted WAAC second officer in the army's Special Services branch, Douglass was sent to New York City to discuss Tin Pan Alley's musical contributions to inspire WAC morale. She was unimpressed with professionally written tunes like "I'm Wacky Over Something in Khaki" and "I'm Doing the WAAC WAAC WAAC Walk." One composition made her feel "so ill I tore it up and put it in our permanent file." (Note: Presumably, the trash bin) Unsurprisingly, Douglass preferred her own song and while in New York arranged for its copyright and publication as "The WAAC is a Soldier Too".

== "Song of the Women's Army Corps" ==
After the war's end, the corps was continued in active service. In 1948, the Women's Armed Services Integration Act granted women permanent status in the regular and reserve forces of all service branches. The Women's Army Corps looked for an official song, similar to the army's "The Army Goes Rolling Along" and the navy's "Anchors Aweigh." The previous versions of White's tune lyrics weren't considered applicable to a peacetime WAC. Douglass, now using her married name, Jane Douglass White, worked by mail with fellow WAC veteran Camilla Mays Frank to update the lyrics. In 1951, their latest revision "Song of the Women's Army Corps" was accepted by the corps as its official anthem, and on March 21, 1951, the newly constituted 14th Army Band (WAC) debuted the song on the Mutual Broadcast System to a national audience. When creating the 1954 film Francis Joins the WACS, the official song was chosen to play under the opening credits, a women's chorus singing the revised lyrics.
