= Jane Douglass White =

American musician and army officer

- Jane Douglass White at her piano in 1981
- Born: Ruby Jane Douglass; April 19, 1919; Coffeyville, Kansas, US
- Died: April 26, 2008 (aged 89)
- Burial place: Williamson Memorial Gardens, Franklin, Tennessee
- Other names: Jane White, Jane Douglass, Jane D. White, J. D. White
- Education: BFA, 1939 University of Oklahoma; MA Columbia University
- Occupations: WAC officer, songwriter, musician
- Years active: 1940–1998
- Spouse: Gail C. White (m. 1948; died 2006)

Jane Douglass White (April 14, 1919 – April 26, 2008), born Ruby Jane Douglass (sometimes spelled Douglas), was an American Women's Army Corps officer, music educator and songwriter. A University of Oklahoma graduate, she wrote several songs during World War II to promote the corps; Captain Douglass was selected in 1944 to command the first all-woman Special Service company.

Before the war, Douglass taught vocal music in the Bristow, Oklahoma public schools. One of her songs, originally entitled "The WAAC is in Back of You", was adapted after the war into the official "Song of the Women's Army Corps". She was awarded a master's degree at Columbia University, while she studied piano with Anton Bilotti. After marriage, she changed her name to Jane Douglass White, becoming a prolific songwriter and music director for stage and television. A song she co-wrote with Sidney Shaw, "Love is a Gamble" was recorded by such artists as Eartha Kitt and Johnny Mathis.

She was an assistant producer with Harry Salter for the 1950s edition of television's Name That Tune and afterwards became a well-known Christian music entertainer. Douglass served as a musical director for Charles Colson's Prison Fellowship program.

== Early life ==
Born in Coffeyville, Kansas, Ruby Jane Douglass grew up in a musical family with an older brother who could play anything "by ear." By the age of five, Ruby Jane was taking music lessons and singing with her family at the Presbyterian church. Before college, she had acquired training and experience in voice, piano, and electric organ. Douglass graduated the University of Oklahoma in 1939 where she was a member of the Alpha Omicron chapter of the Kappa Alpha Theta sorority and president of the Mu Kappa chapter of Mu Phi Epsilon professional music fraternity. As a part of the "Debs in Swing Trio" she and two fellow Thetas entertained fellow Sooners at university alumni events. She was hired by the Bristow Public Schools after graduation and became supervisor of the district's vocal music department. By January 1941, she had copyrighted her first musical composition, "I Wished on a Star".

== Military career ==
After the attack on Pearl Harbor, Douglass volunteered for the new Women's Army Auxiliary Corps (WAAC) and was commissioned third officer. Inspired by the martial rhythm of the clicking of her car tires as she drove home from the induction center in Oklahoma City she wrote her first military song, "The WAAC is in Back of You". During basic training, Douglass taught her fellow WAACs the song, and soon it became a company favorite. According to one source, WAAC commander Col. Oveta Culp Hobby enjoyed hearing the song sufficiently to recognize Douglass, appointing her to the Special Services branch of the army.

After completing training at Fort Des Moines Provisional Army Officer Training School, Douglass was assigned to the new Daytona Beach, Florida, women's training camp, On January 4, 1943, the war department announced Douglass's promotion to second officer, the equivalent to first lieutenant. Douglass several times was sent to New York City, involved in writing "There'll be a New Style Bonnet at the Easter Parade" and "Something New Has Been Added to the Army," two new songs for a soldier's show, a musical review for WAC performances, entitled P.F.C. Mary Brown, a WAC musical revue. She wrote music and lyrics for several songs, assisted by Arthur Altman, Privates Frank Loesser and Hy Zaret. The book for the musical was written by Private Arnold M. Auerbach, Lieutenants Bob Eastright and Jack Hill. Choreography for the musical was provided by Private José Limón.

On September 22, 1943, Douglass was promoted to captain. After promotion, Douglass was made chief of Special Services branch, second WAC training center, Daytona Beach. She compiled and edited the official WAC songbook and expressed an interest in taking a special services unit overseas. Douglass's original WAC composition was published in 1943 as "The WAC is a Soldier Too".

Before the move of the Daytona training facility to Fort Oglethorpe in January 1944, Douglass wrote "Farewell Daytona Beach". In summer 1944 Douglass was one of a group of Special Services WACs ordered to duty in Italy and France, directly entertaining troops and teaching those troops the songs, dances and patter of "blueprint specials." While in Paris, her group worked with former actress Madeleine Carroll distributing music and gifts to local children. On a visit to Saint-Cloud, Douglass and her WACs were themselves honored with music, played by the French on instruments previously hidden from the Nazis during the occupation:

We stood at attention while the French flag was raised and the band played La Marseillaise. Then they raised Old Glory, and the band played probably the worst version of The Star-Spangled Banner that I have ever heard. They had no music and played it by ear. But they made a noble effort and as the tears streamed down my cheeks, I knew that I had never been more proud to be an American.

— Jane Douglass White, 2002,

Returning to Fort Oglethorpe, Douglass was chosen to command the all-female 1st WAC Special Services Company. After getting final approval from Lieutenant Colonel Anna W. Wilson, Douglass began the process of selecting the five officers and 109 soldiers who would compose the unit. For her work in France, Captain Douglass was awarded the Legion of Merit from the War Department.

== Songwriting career ==
After returning to Oklahoma to visit family, Douglass moved to New York City where she wrote songs and studied for her master's degree at Columbia University. During her time in New York, she was introduced to classical pianist Anton Bilotti and after audition asked him to coach her on piano technique. She discovered that her musicianship and wartime experiences gave her confidence to perform in New York City venues; she was quickly hired as the dining room pianist at the Park Sheraton Hotel. Douglass was a featured performer at the Cafe Maurice in 1948.

Bilotti's brother-in-law, recently discharged army master sergeant Gail White met and befriended the ex-captain Douglass. In spring of 1948, the two army veterans co-wrote and published a song together, entitled "Do We?"; White and Douglass said "I do" to each other weeks later, getting married at New York City's Fifth Avenue Presbyterian Church. Later in 1948 Douglass changed her professional name to Jane Douglass White, becoming a member of the American Society of Composers, Authors and Publishers.

White's songwriting career took off when she was asked by the Department of the Army to revise the lyrics of her popular march "The WAC is a Soldier Too" for peacetime use. Working by mail with fellow WAC veteran Camilla Mays Frank to adjust lyrics, the song was adopted by the army as the official "Song of the Women's Army Corps" in 1951. In 1953, popular Hollywood movie star Francis the Talking Mule was utilizing White's and Frank's official corps march in the opening credits of the newest release Francis Joins the WACS.

Several of the songs she co-wrote with Sydney Shaw were published in 1958 by actor Burt Lancaster, producer Harold Hecht, and publisher Loring Buzzell via their music publishing companies Hecht-Lancaster & Buzzell Music and Calyork Music. Two of these, "Whispering Campaign" and "I Don't Want to Do a Thing but Love You" were recorded by The Temples for a single released Date Records in July 1958. "You're the Prettiest Thing" was recorded by Merv Griffin and The Spellbinders for a single released by Decca Records.

== Theater career ==
In 1969 White was operating the Grist Mill Playhouse, an Actor's Equity theater company, in Andover, New Jersey.

== Janet and Jane ==
In 1972, White partnered with mezzo soprano Janet Baird Weisiger to form the duo "Janet and Jane." The two toured the United States playing and singing Christian music; they recorded three albums together and in 1976 were averaging ten concert performances a month. By 1980, White was managing Messiah Music, a small Christian music publisher.

In 1991 White was still active in Prison Fellowship, Charles Colson's prison ministries program. White was providing seminar programs for the incarcerated and their families.

Gail and Jane White would remain married for 58 years until his death in 2006.

== Selected works ==
=== Compositions ===
- "The WAAC is in Back of You" as Ruby Jane Douglass (1943)
- "Do We" as Jane Douglass with Gail C. White (1948)
- "Song of the Women's Army Corps" with Camilla Mays Frank (1951)
- "Empty Words" as Jane Douglass with Jimmy Gayle (1951)
- "Happy Polka" as Jane Douglass with Jimmy Gayle (1951)
- "Look in the Mirror" as Jane Douglass with Abe L. Laufe (1951)
- "Ruby Lips" as Jane Douglass with Jimmy Gayle (1951)
- "I Wish I Had a Penny" with Camilla Mays Frank (1953)
- "It's the Fashion" with Thomas Henry O'Malley (1953)
- "Sea in a Shell" as Jane Douglass with Ruth Hughes Aarons (1953)
- "Have a Heart" as Jane Douglass with Thomas Henry O'Malley (1953)
- "I'll Be Good to You" as Jane Douglass with Thomas Henry O'Malley (1953)
- "Say Hey (The Willie Mays Song)" with Dick Kleiner (1954) recorded by The Treniers with Willie Mays, Quincy Jones producing
- "French Poodle" recorded by Sam Butera and the Witnesses
- "Blue Jean Blues" with Richard Kleiner (1957) recorded by Sharon Strauss
- "Joanie" (1957)
- "New Orleans Madness" (1957)
- "Be on the Lookout" with Sydney Shaw (1958)
- "The Garden" with Ruth Eby (1958)
- "I Don't Want to Do Anything But Love You" with Sydney Shaw (1958)
- "Time Will Tell" with Sydney Shaw (1958)
- "Whispering Campaign" with Sydney Shaw (1958) recorded by The Temples in 1958
- "Love is a Gamble" with Sydney Shaw (1959) recorded by Johnny Mathis, recorded by Eartha Kitt
- "(You're the) Purtiest Thing" recorded by Merv Griffin, recorded by Sharon Strauss
- "Lover's Quarrel" with Sharon Strauss (1961)
- "Three Guesses" with Linda Sampson (1961)
- "Groovy" as Jane D. White (1963) recorded by Dick Watson, produced by Jane D. White
- "Julius" (1963)
- "Be on the Lookout (for the Woman)" with Sydney Shaw (1963) recorded by Dick Watson, produced by Jane D. White
- "Tipsy Gypsy from P'Kipsie" as J.D. White with Jay Rio, recorded by Jane D. White and the Hollywoods
- "Alas! ...No Gas" (1963) recorded by Jane White
- "Black and White and Read All Over Blues" with Mike Strauss (1963)
- "William" (1963)
- "Ring Around Rosie" (1963)
- "Tex, The Cowboy Santa Claus" as Jane Douglas White (1963)
- "How I Love My Love" with Sidney Shaw and Michael Edwards (1968)
- Songs of Joy and Praise As Sung By Janet and Jane with Janet Weisiger (1973), ten songs, Messiah Music
- "I Surrender" (1981)
- "The Shepherd Evangelist Pastoral Counselor Blues : (The Pastor's Song)" (1991)

=== Musicals ===
- Guardian Angel, a musical comedy in two acts and 12 scenes, music by Jane Douglass White, book and lyrics by Burton Crane (1955)
- Anyone for Love? a musical comedy in two acts, music by Jane Douglass White, book and lyrics by Burton Crane (1956)
- The Easter Yegg with Thomas Henry O'Malley (1997)
- The Christmas Caper : Where is the Love? a mini musical with Thomas Henry O'Malley (1997)
