= Joan Regan =

English singer (1928–2013)

- Born: Joan Eileen Bethell; 19 January 1928; Romford, Essex, England
- Died: 12 September 2013 (aged 85) London, England
- Genres: Traditional pop
- Occupations: Singer, actress
- Instrument: Vocals
- Years active: 1953–2013
- Labels: Decca, emi Pye, Nectar
- Spouse(s): Dick Howell (m. 1946; union dissolved); 3 children Harry Claff (m. 1957-1963; divorced); 1 child Martin Cowan (m. 1966)

Joan Regan (born Joan Eileen Bethell; 19 January 1928 – 12 September 2013) was an English traditional pop singer, popular during the 1950s and early 1960s.

== Biography ==
Joan Eileen Bethell was born in West Ham, Essex, on 19 January 1928, the youngest of six children born to Joseph Bethell and Katherine E. Hartnett, whose marriage was registered in March 1916. The family was of at least partial Irish Catholic descent. Joan suffered from rheumatic fever as a child, which left her with a damaged mitral valve, although this did not cause problems until she was in her seventies.

Regan married an American serviceman, Dick Howell, a friend of her brothers who met in the Navy. She and Howell married on her birthday in January 1946. For a time they lived in Burbank, California. They had three children, one of whom died at an early age. The marriage eventually broke down. Regan, a Catholic, was able to obtain a legal dissolution, rather than a divorce. Before becoming a singer, Regan worked at a number of jobs, including re-touching photographs. Her successful singing career began in 1953, when she made a demo record of "Too Young" and "I'll Walk Alone". The demo came to the attention of Bernard Delfont, and that helped her sign a recording contract with Decca Records.

She had a number of Top 40 hits for the label, many of them were cover versions of American hits. Among them were Teresa Brewer's "Ricochet", "Till I Waltz Again with You", and "Jilted", Doris Day's "If I Give My Heart to You" and Jill Corey's "Cleo and Me-O" and "Love Me to Pieces".

Beginning on 18 November 1953, she became the resident singer on BBC producer Richard Afton's television series Quite Contrary. Afton later replaced Regan with Ruby Murray as resident vocalist, beginning with the show on 23 June 1954. She appeared on the Six-Five Special, and was given her own BBC television series, Be My Guest, which ran for four series starting in 1959.

After being knocked out by a descending safety curtain during her first appearance in variety, she developed her act to include impressions of Judy Garland, Gracie Fields and Anna Neagle, the latter of whom she bore a facial resemblance to. In the late 1950s, she appeared several times at the London Palladium, including the Royal Command Performance in 1955 and also in the show Stars in Your Eyes with Cliff Richard, Russ Conway, and Edmund Hockridge which ran for a six-month season at the Palladium in 1960. In 1958, she appeared as herself in the film Hello London.

On leaving Decca in 1958, she signed with EMI's His Master's Voice label, where she had a Top 10 hit with a cover version of the McGuire Sisters' "May You Always". Two years later, she left EMI for Pye Records, and had two minor record successes ("Happy Anniversary" and "Papa Loves Mama").

In July 1957, she married her second husband, Harry Claff, who was the joint general manager and box office manager at the Palladium. In November that year, the Daily Herald reported Regan was to have a baby in February 1958, seven months after the wedding. After receiving "abusive and wounding letters from people who were personally unknown to her", Regan successfully sued the newspaper for libel; her daughter, Donna, was actually born in April 1958. Claff and Regan divorced in 1963 after Claff was sentenced to prison for embezzlement of £62,000. He served five years in prison. His defence was that he had only "borrowed" some money from the London Palladium, where he was box office manager, and would have paid it back. By this time, Regan's hits had dried up, and she suffered a nervous breakdown.

Regan married her third and last husband, Martin Cowan, a medical doctor, at Caxton Hall, London on 12 September 1966. After Cowan's retirement, they moved to Florida in 1982.

In the United States, Regan recorded two singles for Columbia (one of which, "Don't Talk To Me About Love", went on to become a Northern soul favourite). In 1984, she slipped in the shower, hit her head on the tiles and suffered a brain haemorrhage. After an emergency operation, she was left paralysed and speechless. Her recovery, which entailed much physical and speech therapy, was aided by her miming to her old records. It took many months of treatment before she regained the ability to sing.

In 1988, she returned to the UK where, with the help and encouragement of Russ Conway, who had been her rehearsal pianist in the early 1950s, she returned to the stage. She recorded for Nectar Records from 1989 to 1996, for whom she recorded a single, "You Needed Me", and two albums, The Joan Regan Collection and Remember I Love You.

== Later life and death ==
Regan continued singing, entertaining and supporting her charities, including the Not Forgotten Association, until she was 84. She died on 12 September 2013, at the age of 85.

== Discography ==
=== Albums ===
- The Girl Next Door (Decca, 1954)
- Just Joan (Decca, 1956)
- Joan and Ted (with Edmund Hockridge) (Pye-Nixa, 1961)
- The World of Joan Regan (Decca, 1976)
- Remember I Love You (Nectar Music, 1996)
- The Best of Joan Regan (Pulse, 1999)
- The Best of Joan Regan (Spectrum Music, 2001)
- Soft Sands – Decca Singles (Vocalion, 2004)

=== Singles ===
Year	Single	Peak chart positions		
Year	Single	AUS	UK	US
1953	"Till They've All Gone Home" b/w "I'll Always Be Thinking of You"	—	—	23
1953	"The Long Way" b/w "Rag-a-Bone Man"	—	—	—
1953	"Ricochet" (with the Squadronaires) b/w "Merry-Go-Rounds and Swings"	—	8	—
1954	"Red, Red, Red" b/w "Tani"	—	—	—
1954	Someone Else's Roses" b/w "The Love I Have for You"	—	5	—
1954	"Cleo and Me-o" (with Dickie Valentine) b/w "Pine Tree, Pine Over Me"	—	—	—
1954	"I'll Travel with You" b/w "Jil Ted"	—	—	—
1954	"If I Give My Heart to You" b/w "Faded Flowers"	—	3	—
1954	"Wait for Me, Darling" (with the Johnston Brothers) b/w "Two Kinds of Tears"	—	18	—
1954	"This Ole House" (with the Keynotes) b/w "Can This Be Love?"	—	—	—
1955	"Prize of Gold" b/w "When You're in Love"	21	6	—
1955	"Open Up Your Heart and Let the Sunshine In" (with Rusty Regan) b/w "If You Learn to Love Each Other"	—	19	—
1955	"Don't Be Afraid of Love" b/w "Danger! Heartbreak Ahead"	—	—	—
1955	"Just Say You Love Her" b/w "Nobody Danced with Me"	—	—	—
1955	"The Shepherd Boy" b/w "The Rose and the Flame"	—	—	—
1955	"Croce di Oro" b/w "Evermore" (US); "Love and Marriage" (UK)	—	—	55
1956	"Don't Take Me for Granted" b/w "The Boy with the Magic Guitar"	—	—	—
1956	"Honestly" b/w "I'd Never Leave You Baby" (with the Johnston Brothers)	—	—	—
1956	"Sweet Heartaches" b/w "Second Fiddle"	—	—	—
1956	"Gone" b/w "Make Me a Child Again"	—	—	—
1957	"Nearer to Me" b/w "Cross My Ever-Loving Heart"	—	—	—
1957	"Wonderful! Wonderful!" b/w "Speak for Yourself John"	—	—	—
1957	"Good Evening Friends" (with Max Bygraves) b/w "7½ Cents"	—	—	—
1957	"Love Me to Pieces" b/w "Soft Sands"	—	—	—
1958	"I May Never Pass This Way Again" b/w "Breezin' Along with the Breeze"	—	—	—
1958	"Love Like Ours" b/w "Take Me in Your Arms"	—	—	—
1959	"May You Always" b/w "Have You Ever Been Lonely?"	—	—	—
1959	"May You Always" b/w "Who's Afraid (Not I, Not I, Not I)"	—	9	—
1959	"Happy Anniversary" b/w "So Close to My Heart"	—	29	—
1960	"If Only You'd Be Mine" b/w "O Dio Mio"	—	—	—
1960	"Papa Loves Mama" b/w "When You Know Someone Loves You"	—	29	—
1960	"One of the Lucky Ones" b/w "My Thanks to You"	—	47	—
1960	"Must Be Santa" b/w "Will Santa Come to Shanty Town"	—	42	—
1961	"How Wonderful to Know" b/w "(Ting-a-Ling) It Must Be Spring"	—	—	—
1961	"We Who Are in Love (Nous les Amoureux)" b/w "My Foolish Heart"	—	—	—
1961	"Surprisin'" b/w "In the Arms of My Love"	—	—	—
1962	"Most People Get Married" b/w "Don't Let Me Stand in Your Way"	—	—	—
1963	"Wand'ring Boy" b/w "Golden Dreams'"	—	—	—
1966	"Don't Talk to Me About Love" b/w "I'm No Toy"	—	—	—
1967	"No One Beside Me" b/w "A Love So Fine"	—	—	—
1989	"You Needed Me" b/w "Together Again"	—	—	—
"—" denotes releases that did not chart or were not released.

=== Songs ===
Regan recorded a number of other songs, including "It's a Big, Wide, Wonderful World" and "That Old Feeling".

== See also ==
- List of artists under the Decca Records label
