= Devil's Elbow =

Devil's Elbow or Devils Elbow may refer to:

== Geography ==
=== Australia ===
- Devil's Elbow (Murray River), a bend in the Murray River, New South Wales
- Devil's Elbow, formerly on the Mount Barker Road, South Australia

=== Canada ===
- Devil's Elbow (Stikine River), in British Columbia
- Devil's Elbow Ski Area, Ontario, a ski areas in Canada

=== United Kingdom ===
- Devil's Elbow, Isle of Man, a hairpin road bend
- Devil's Elbow, a double-hairpin road bend in the Cairnwell Pass, Scotland
- Devil's Elbow, the final corner at Mallory Park racing circuit in England
- Devil's Elbow, a turning on the A169 road, beside the Hole of Horcum in North Yorkshire
- Devil's Elbow, a corner on the B6105 road north of Glossop, Derbyshire, in England

=== United States ===
- Devils Elbow, Michigan, an unincorporated community in Grand Traverse County
- Devils Elbow, Missouri, an unincorporated community in Pulaski County
- Devil's Elbow State Park, Heceta Head, Oregon

== Music ==
- Devils Elbow, a 2007 album by The Mess Hall
- Devil's Elbow (Doug Kershaw album), 1972, and its title track
- "Devil's Elbow", 2013 song by Nick Warren

== Other uses ==
- The Devil's Elbow, a 1951 novel by Gladys Mitchell
