= Here Come the Yankees =

New York Yankees fight song

"Here Come the Yankees" is the official fight song of the New York Yankees baseball team.

It has been the official team anthem since 1967, when it was composed by Bob Bundin and Lou Stallman. Bundin and Stallman were associated at the time with Columbia Records, whose then-owner, the media conglomerate CBS, was also the parent company of the Yankees. It was recorded by the Sid Bass Orchestra and Mitch Miller's Sing Along with Mitch Chorus. The instrumental version airs at the top of all Yankees radio broadcasts and was also used on Yankee telecasts until 1990 and when WCBS2 had the Yankees in 2002 and 2003 seasons during the end broadcast.

Since 2024, an instrumental version of the song has been played during the YES Network's "Name That Yankee" segment, which replaced the daily in-game trivia questions on the broadcast.
