= Jilted (song) =

"Jilted" is a popular song with music by Dick Manning and lyrics by Robert Colby, published in 1954.

== Teresa Brewer recording ==
Teresa Brewer recorded the biggest-selling version on December 29, 1953. This recording was released by Coral Records as catalog number 61152. It first reached the U.S. Billboard chart on April 14, 1954, lasting nine weeks and peaking at number 14 on the Best Seller chart and number 6 all together.

== Other 1954 recordings ==
Other 1954 recordings were made by Diana Decker, Red Foley and by the UK based singers Alma Cogan and Joan Regan.
