= Sid Bass (songwriter) =

American songwriter (1913–1993)

Sid Bass (January 22, 1913 – June 19, 1993) was an American arranger, composer, conductor and songwriter who was most successful in the 1960s.

== Biography ==
Bass was born in New York City and studied music at New York University. He spent three years in the Army Air Corps, conducting bands that played for hospital patients, at Officers' Club events, and radio shows.

In 1950, Bass was named musical director of Jubilee Records, arranging for The Orioles, The Four Tunes, The Dominoes, The Collegians and others. Bass also wrote or co-wrote such songs as "The Old Soft Shoe", "Greatest Feeling in the World", and "Pine Tree, Pine over Me".

In February 1961, he became Carlton Records musical director, arranger, and conductor. After working for Muzak he was hired as a staff composer by RCA. He also recorded a number of albums for RCA, many appearing on their low-budget "Vik" label. One highlight of Bass' work was his orchestration of Gale Garnett's 1964 hit album My Kind of Folk Songs. Working alongside producer Andy Wiswell, Bass' efforts also yielded Garnett's top 5 hit "We'll Sing in the Sunshine" (which she also wrote) that same year.

In 1962 Bass also received arranging credits for the first two Four Seasons' hits "Sherry" and "Big Girls Don't Cry" as well as their Christmas LP Seasons Greetings. Bass also conducted and arranged songs of Staff Sergeant Barry Sadler, including the hit song "The Ballad of the Green Berets". In 1963 he arranged and conducted for Jaco Pastorius’ father Jack Pastorius; they recorded “I Really Love You (Bossa Nova)” and “Please Don’t Love Me” for 711 Records.

In 1967, Sid Bass and his orchestra, together with Mitch Miller's Sing Along with Mitch Chorus recorded the "Here Come the Yankees" theme that's still played before each New York Yankee radio broadcast.
