= Rusty and Doug =

Country and cajun music duo

Rusty & Doug
- Rusty and Doug Kershaw, 1950s

Background information
- Origin: Louisiana, United States
- Genres: Country, bluegrass
- Years active: 1953–1959; 1961–1963
- Labels: Feature; Hickory; RCA Victor; Mercury; Princess
- Past members: Doug Kershaw; Rusty Kershaw

Rusty & Doug were an American country music and cajun music duo composed of Doug Kershaw (born January 24, 1936) and his younger brother, Rusty Kershaw (February 2, 1938 – October 23, 2001).

The two recorded for Hickory Records between 1955 and 1961, charting five times on the Hot Country Songs charts. They also performed on the Louisiana Hayride and Wheeling Jamboree. They became members of the Grand Ole Opry in the 1950s.

The duo broke up in 1959 as both brothers entered the United States Army, but reunited between 1961 and 1963. Doug continued as a solo artist.

Rusty Kershaw died of a heart attack on October 23, 2001, at the age of 63.

== Singles ==
Year	A-side	B-side	Peak chart Positions	
Year	A-side	B-side	US Country	US Bubbling
1954	"It’s Better To Be A Has Been (Than Be A Never Was)"	"No, No, It's Not So"	—	—
1955	"So Lovely Baby"	"Why Cry for You"	14	—
1955	"Look Around (Take a Look At Me)"	"Can I Be Dreaming"	—	—
1956	"Let's Stay Together"	"Honey, Honey"	—	—
1956	"Hey, You There" (with Wiley Barkdull)	"Your Crazy, Crazy Heart"	—	—
1956	"Mister Love" (with Wiley Barkdull)	"I'll Understand"	—	—
1957	"Going Down the Road" (with Carolee Cooper)	"You'll See"	—	—
1957	"Love Me to Pieces"	"I Never Had the Blues"	14	—
1957	"Dream Queen"	"Take My Love"	—	—
1958	"Why Don't You Love Me"	"Hey Mae"	—	—
1958	"Hey Sheriff"	"Sweet Thing (Tell Me That You Love Me)"	22	—
1958	"We'll Do It Anyway"	"It's Too Late"	—	—
1959	"Kaw-Liga" (with Wiley Barkdull)	"Never Love Again"	—	—
1959	"Dancing Shoes" (with Wiley Barkdull)	"I Like You (Like This)	—	—
1959	"The Love I Want" (with Wiley Barkdull)	"Oh Love"	—	—
1961	"Louisiana Man"	"Make Me Realize"	10	4
1961	"Diggy Liggy Lo"	"Hey Mae"	14	—
1962	"Cheated Too"	"So Lovely Baby" [re-recording]	—	—
1962	"Cajun Joe (The Bully of the Bayou)"	"Sweet Sweet Girl to Me"	—	—
1963	"My Uncle Abel	"Pirogue (Pero)"	—	—
1963	"Cajun Stripper"	"Half the Time"	—	—
1964	"Cleopatra"	"Malinda"	—	—
1964	"St. Louis Blues"	"I Can't See Myself"	—	—
1965	"I'd Walk a Country Mile (For a Country Girl)"	"I Haven't Found It Yet"	—	—
1965	"It Takes All Day (Just to Get Over Nite)"	"The Sooner You Go (I Can Cry)"	—	—
1966	"Little Papoose"	"Sweet Genevieve"	—	—
