= Robert Colby =

American writer and theatrical producer (1922–1987)

Robert Colby (July 7, 1922 – March 10, 1987) was an American songwriter, music publisher and theatrical producer. Among his songs were "Jilted" and "Free Again". He composed the music and lyrics for the 1962 Off-Broadway musical Half-past Wednesday, based on the fairy tale Rumpelstiltskin. He produced the 1968 Paul Mauriat hit recording of "Love is Blue".
