= Doug Kershaw =

American singer-songwriter

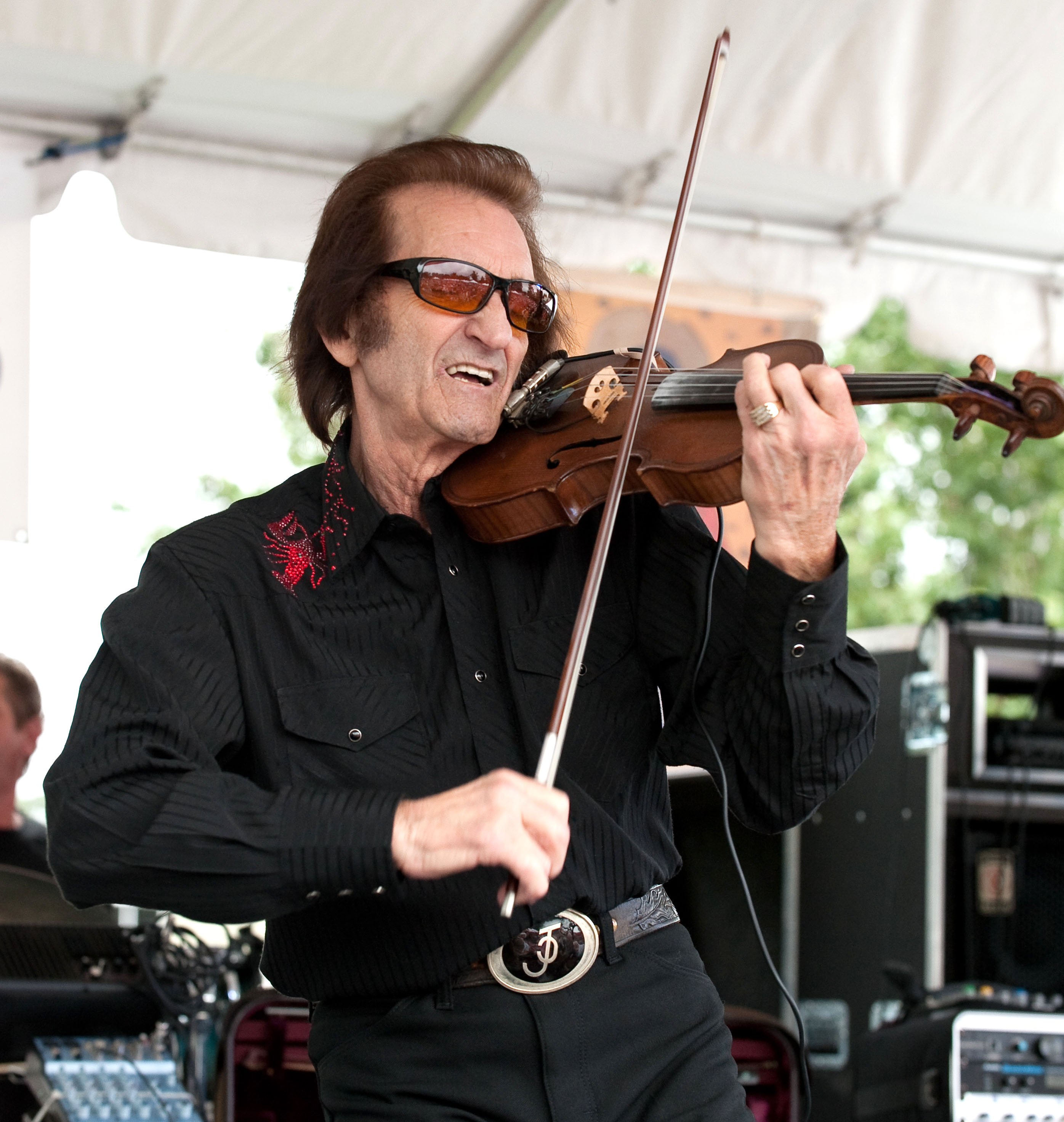
- Doug Kershaw playing the fiddle at the 2009 Festivals Acadiens et Créoles.

Background information
- Born: Douglas James Kershaw; January 24, 1936 (age 90); Cameron Parish, Louisiana, U.S.
- Origin: Louisiana
- Genres: Cajun music, country, folk, bluegrass
- Occupations: Musician, songwriter
- Instruments: Vocals, fiddle, cajun accordion, guitar
- Years active: 1948–present

Douglas James Kershaw (born January 24, 1936) is an American fiddle player, singer, and songwriter from Louisiana. Active since 1948, he began his career as part of the duo Rusty and Doug, along with his brother, Rusty Kershaw. He had an extensive solo career that included 15 albums and singles that charted on the Hot Country Songs charts. He is also a member of the Louisiana Music Hall of Fame, being inducted in 2009.

== Early life ==
Born in an unincorporated community called Tiel Ridge in Cameron Parish, Kershaw spoke Louisiana French and did not learn English until the age of eight. By that time, he had mastered the fiddle, which he played from the age of five, and was on his way to teaching himself to play 28 instruments. His first gig was at a local bar, the Bucket of Blood, where he was accompanied by his mother on guitar.

Kershaw became interested in Cajun music during parties his parents would host on the family's houseboat in Louisiana, where he first heard Cajun bands playing the music.

== Doug and Rusty ==
Doug grew up surrounded by Cajun fiddle and accordion music. After teaching his brother, Rusty, to play guitar, he formed a band, the Continental Playboys, with Rusty and older brother Nelson "Peewee" Kershaw in 1948. With the departure of Peewee from the group, in the early 1950s, Rusty and Doug continued to perform as a duo. In 1955, when Kershaw was 19, Rusty and he performed on the Louisiana Hayride KWKH radio broadcast in Shreveport. The two also performed at the WWVA Jamboree (later renamed Jamboree U.S.A.), in Wheeling, West Virginia.

Although the brothers initially sang in French, J. D. "Jay" Miller, owner of the Feature Records label, persuaded them to incorporate songs in English into their repertoire. In 1955, Doug and Rusty recorded their first single, "So Lovely, Baby". Released on the Hickory label, the tune went to number 14 on the country music charts. Later that same year, Doug and Rusty were invited to become members of the Louisiana Hayride cast. The Kershaws appeared on the Grand Ole Opry in Nashville, Tennessee, and became regular members of the Opry cast the following year. Despite the demands of his music career, Doug enrolled in McNeese State University, in Lake Charles, Louisiana, where he earned an undergraduate degree in mathematics. At the peak of their early career, in 1958, Doug and Rusty both enlisted in the United States Army. They devoted their attention to the military until their discharge three years later.

== "Louisiana Man" and solo career ==
After fulfilling their military obligation, the two brothers recorded "Louisiana Man", an autobiographical song that Doug had written while in the Army. The song not only sold millions of copies, but also over the years has come to be considered a standard of modern Cajun music. The song was eventually covered by more than 800 artists.

Three albums were released by the duo on Hickory Records, only one being released before they split up. The first was Rusty and Doug Sing Louisiana Man (LPM 103) in 1961. Kershaw (Genus Cambarus) (LPS 163) was released in 1972 and was a double LP. Louisiana Man (HR 4506) was the final Hickory album, released in 1974. By 1964, the brothers had elected to go their separate ways. Another three years passed before Kershaw signed a songwriter's contract with BMI, in 1967.

In June 1969, Kershaw made his first network-television appearance on the debut of the Johnny Cash Show. After watching Kershaw's Johnny Cash Show performance as an eight-year-old boy, Mark O'Connor became inspired to learn to play the fiddle. He capped the year with a week-long engagement at the New York City's Fillmore East as opening act for Eric Clapton's Derek and the Dominos. While it seemed to many rock and pop fans that Kershaw had appeared out of nowhere, he had already sold more than 18 million copies of the records he had made in the early '60s with his brother, Rusty. "Louisiana Man" had been a top-10 country hit in 1961 and its follow-up, "Diggy Liggy Lo", had done almost as well. His performance in front of a national audience led to Warner Bros. Records signing him to a long-term contract. In July 1969, he performed at the Newport Folk Festival along with Joni Mitchell, Arlo Guthrie, Ramblin' Jack Elliott, Big Mama Thornton, and Mimi Fariña, among others. Newcomers that year were Don McLean, James Taylor, and Jerry Jeff Walker. In November 1969, "Louisiana Man" was broadcast back to Earth by the crew of the Apollo 12 Moon mission. Beyond the southern venues, Kershaw became widely known in mainstream America as he played at major urban concert halls.

In 1970, Kershaw contributed a violin part to Arlo Guthrie's record single "Alice's Rock and Roll Restaurant."

In 1971, Kershaw had an acting and musical cameo, appearing briefly as a sort of "clairvoyant" desert fiddler in the film dubbed the first "electric" Western film titled Zachariah, starring Don Johnson and John Rubinstein.

Kershaw's playing was featured in the Richard Brooks 1971 film Dollars.

In 1972, Kershaw played electric fiddle in Grand Funk Railroad's "Flight of the Phoenix" off their LP Phoenix.

== Later life ==
Despite the success of his solo career, Kershaw was plagued by depression and sorrow. His father had committed suicide when Kershaw was only seven. Marrying his wife, Pam, at the Houston Astrodome on June 21, 1975, Kershaw began raising his own family that included five sons – Douglas Jr, Victor, Zachary, Tyler, and Elijah. Tyler played drums in his band, and managed his shows, as well.

In 1978, Kershaw appeared briefly as a fiddler in the film Days of Heaven.

Kershaw rebounded with his biggest-selling hit, "Hello Woman", which reached the country music top 40. By 1984, Kershaw's battle with drug and alcohol abuse came to a close and his previously erratic behavior changed for the better.

In 1988, he recorded a duet, "Cajun Baby", with Hank Williams, Jr., that became a top-50 country hit. Kershaw released a French-language album, Two-Step Fever, in 1999, and Michael Doucet of BeauSoleil is featured on the duet "Fievre de Deux Etapes". Hot Diggity Doug was released in mid-2000 and Still Cajun After All These Years followed in early 2001, in which Kershaw was joined on tour by his eldest grandson Josh Kershaw on guitar. His brother Rusty died on October 23, 2001.

Kershaw formerly owned and operated the Bayou House, a restaurant in Lucerne, Colorado, but parted ways with his partners in 2007 due to his displeasure with management and ambiance.

In 2009, Doug was inducted into the Louisiana Music Hall of Fame.

Doug's third cousin is country music star Sammy Kershaw.

== Discography ==
=== Albums ===
Year	Album	Chart Positions			Label
Year	Album	US Country	AUS	CAN	Label
1969	The Cajun Way	—	—	—	Warner Bros.
1970	Spanish Moss	—	—	86	Warner Bros.
1971	Doug Kershaw	—	—	—	Warner Bros.
1972	Swamp Grass	—	—	—	Warner Bros.
1972	Devil's Elbow	—	—	—	Warner Bros.
1973	Douglas James Kershaw	—	—	—	Warner Bros.
1974	Mama Kershaw's Boy	14	—	—	Warner Bros.
1975	Alive & Pickin'	32	95	—	Warner Bros.
1976	Ragin' Cajun	44	—	—	Warner Bros.
1977	Flip, Flop & Fly	47	—	—	Warner Bros.
1978	The Louisiana Man	—	—	—	Warner Bros.
1979	Louisiana Cajun Country	—	—	—	Starfire
1981	Instant Hero	—	—	—	Scotti Bros.
1989	Hot Diggidy Doug	—	—	—	BGM
1989	The Best of Doug Kershaw	—	—	—	Warner Bros.

=== Singles ===
Year	Single	Chart Positions		Album	Label
Year	Single	US Country	CAN Country	Album	Label
1967	"Ain't Gonna Get Me Down"	—	—	single only	K-Ark
1969	"You Fight Your Fight (I'll Fight Me)"	—	—	The Cajun Way	Warner Bros.
1969	"Diggy Liggy Lo"	70	1	The Cajun Way	Warner Bros.
1970	"Orange Blossom Special"	—	9	Spanish Moss	Warner Bros.
1970	"Natural Man"	—	—	Doug Kershaw	Warner Bros.
1971	"Mama Said Yeah"	—	—	Doug Kershaw	Warner Bros.
1971	"Play, Fiddle, Play"	—	—	Doug Kershaw	Warner Bros.
1972	"My Sally Jo"	—	—	Devil's Elbow	Warner Bros.
1972	"Jamestown Ferry"	—	—	Devil's Elbow	Warner Bros.
1974	"Mama's Got the Know How"	77	83	Mama Kershaw's Boy	Warner Bros.
1974	"Nickel in My Pocket"	—	—	Mama Kershaw's Boy	Warner Bros.
1974	"All You Want to Do Is Make Kids"	—	—	single only	Warner Bros.
1974	"Louisiana Sun"	—	—	single only	Pacemaker
1976	"It Takes All Day to Get Over Night"	76	—	Ragin' Cajun	Warner Bros.
1976	"House Husband"	—	—	Ragin' Cajun	Warner Bros.
1977	"I'm Walkin'"	96	—	Flip, Flop & Fly	Warner Bros.
1977	"You Won't Let Me"	—	—	Flip, Flop & Fly	Warner Bros.
1978	"Marie"	—	—	The Louisiana Man	Warner Bros.
1981	"Hello Woman"	29	—	Instant Hero	Scotti Bros.
1981	"Instant Hero"	—	—	Instant Hero	Scotti Bros.
1982	"Keep Between the Ditches"	—	—	The Dukes Of Hazzard (Various Artists)	Scotti Bros.
1985	"My Toot-Toot" (with Fats Domino)	—	—	Hot Diggidy Doug	Toot Toot Recordz
1988	"Cajun Baby" (with Hank Williams, Jr.)	52	—	Hot Diggidy Doug	BGM
1989	"Boogie Queen"	66	—	Hot Diggidy Doug	BGM

== Notes ==
1. This recording of "Louisiana Sun" dates from the 1960s, and likely features an uncredited Rusty Kershaw.
2. Promo copies exist with a re-recording of the song as "Don't Mess With My Popeye's", done specially for the fast food chain.

== Relevant reading ==
- Kershaw, Doug, and Cathie Pelletier. The Ragin' Cajun: Memoir of a Louisiana Man. United States: Mercer University Press, 2019.
