= Dick Kleiner =

American columnist

Richard Arthur Kleiner (March 9, 1921 – February 13, 2002) was an American columnist whose breezy question-and-answer column about Hollywood celebrities, "Ask Dick Kleiner", appeared in hundreds of newspapers across the country. He was also a published book author, songwriter and voice actor.

Kleiner wrote about Broadway for fifteen years, then switched to covering Hollywood in 1964. He was syndicated by Newspaper Enterprise Association. Over the next 25 years, he interviewed thousands of stars and would-be stars. His books included Please Don't Shoot My Dog: The Autobiography of Jackie Cooper and The Two of Us, with Tony Martin and Cyd Charisse.

Kleiner wrote the lyrics for "Say Hey -- The Willie Mays Song" (with Jane Douglass White's music) and Pearl Bailey's "It'll Get Worse". He also provided the voice of one of the rats in The Secret of NIMH.

== Personal life ==
Although Kleiner retired from his other duties in 1989, he continued the column until December 2001. He died two months later, aged 80. He was survived by his wife Hortensia ("Chicki") and their three children.

== See also ==
- List of newspaper columnists
