= Pine Tree, Pine over Me =

Song

"Pine Tree, Pine over Me" is a popular song written by Roy Jordan, Sid Bass, and Jimmy Brewster. It was published in 1953.

The best-selling version in the United States was a recording by Johnny Desmond, Eileen Barton, and The McGuire Sisters on Coral Records (catalog number 61126). The song spent one week on the Cash Box magazine Best-Selling Records chart, at #27 on March 13, 1954. The flip side was "Cling to Me".

The best-selling version in the United Kingdom was a duet by Dickie Valentine and Joan Regan.

== Recorded versions ==
- Molly Bee
- Johnny Desmond, Eileen Barton, and The McGuire Sisters
- Bob Gibson
- Dickie Valentine and Joan Regan
