= Love Me to Pieces =

Single by Jill Corey
- B-side: "Love"
- Released: June 24, 1957
- Recorded: 1957
- Genre: Traditional pop
- Length: 1:55
- Label: Columbia
- Songwriter(s): Melvin Endsley

Jill Corey singles chronology
"Let It Be Me" (1957)	"Love Me to Pieces" (1957)	"Fascination" (1957)

"Love Me to Pieces" is a popular and country song. It was written by Melvin Endsley and was published in 1957.

The song was recorded by a number of country music singers, including Janis Martin, Kitty Wells and Rusty & Doug. Their version went to number 14 on the country music charts in 1957.

On the pop music side, the biggest hit version in the United States was by Jill Corey, who took it to number 11 on the Pop charts, with Joan Regan covering it in the United Kingdom.
