= May You Always =

1958 popular song by Larry Markes and Richard Charles Krieg

"May You Always" is a popular song by Larry Markes (lyrics) and Dick Charles (pseudonym of Richard Charles Krieg), published in 1958.

The biggest hit version in the United States was by the McGuire Sisters where it peaked at No. 11 on the Billboard Hot 100. In the United Kingdom, Joan Regan took her version to No. 9 in the UK Singles Chart.

== Cover versions ==
The song has also been covered by: Bobby Vinton, Maureen Evans, the Lennon Sisters, Anita Bryant, Barbara Cook, David Carroll, and Ian McNabb.
