= The McGuire Sisters =

American singing trio

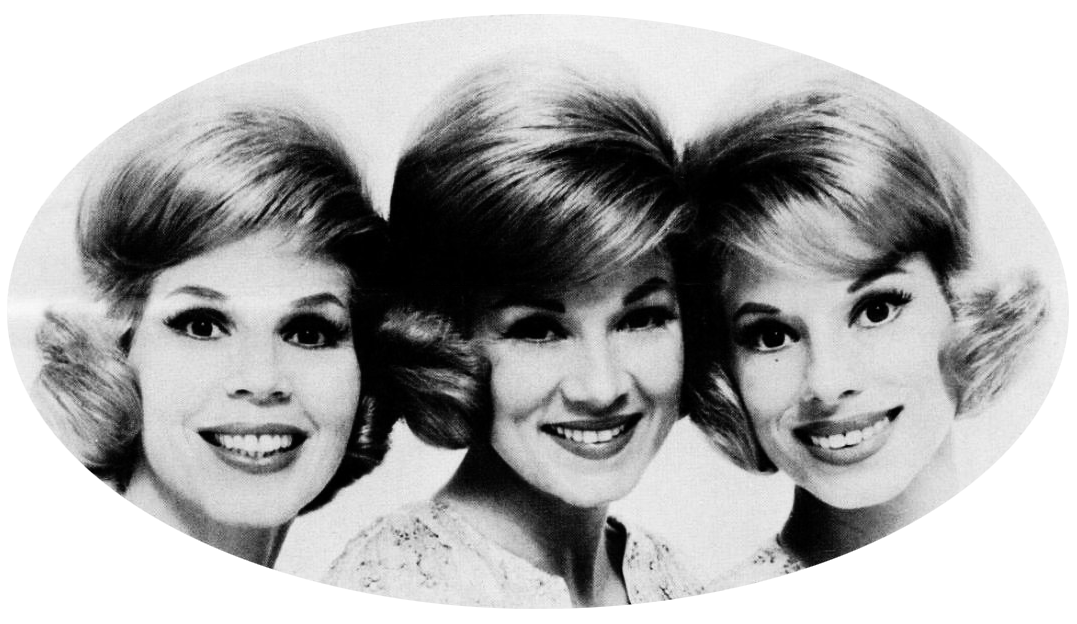
- The McGuire Sisters in 1964

Background information
- Origin: Middletown, Ohio, U.S.
- Genre: Traditional pop
- Years active: 1952–1968; 1986–2004
- Past members: Christine McGuire; Dorothy "Dottie" McGuire; Phyllis Jean McGuire

The McGuire Sisters were a close-harmony singing trio in American popular music. The group was composed of sisters Christine (July 30, 1926 – December 28, 2018), Dottie (February 13, 1928 – September 7, 2012), and Phyllis (February 14, 1931 – December 29, 2020) McGuire. Among their most popular songs are "Sincerely" and "Sugartime", both number-one hits.

== Early years ==
The McGuire sisters were born to Asa and Lillie (Fultz) McGuire in Middletown, Ohio, and grew up in Miamisburg near Dayton. Their mother, Lillie, was a minister of the Miamisburg First Church of God, where, as children, they sang in church at weddings, funerals, and revivals. When they started singing in 1935, the youngest sister, Phyllis, was four years old. Eventually, they sang at occasions outside church, and by 1949 were singing at military bases and veterans' hospitals, performing a more diverse repertoire than they had in church.

== Career in show business ==
The McGuire Sisters signed with Coral Records in 1952. In the same year, they appeared on Arthur Godfrey's Talent Scouts, and Godfrey hired them for his other shows, where they remained for seven years. The November 1953 issue of Cosmopolitan called them "Godfrey's Merry McGuires". The majority of their recordings for Coral Records (1953-1964) were overseen by arranger/conductor Dick Jacobs. The sisters often were compared to the Andrews Sisters. Maxene Andrews said in an interview with Joe Franklin on WOR (AM) radio in 1979, "The McGuire Sisters were fine once they stopped imitating the Andrews Sisters." While working on the Godfrey show, the McGuires befriended singer Lu Ann Simms and attended her wedding to music publisher Loring Buzzell in July 1956. Buzzell's music publishing firm, Hecht-Lancaster & Buzzell Music (co-owned by Harold Hecht and Burt Lancaster) provided two songs for the McGuire Sisters, "May You Always", which became the best-selling 45 and sheet music of 1959, and "Theme from The Unforgiven (The Need for Love)", which became another big hit in 1960.

The McGuire Sisters were the Mystery Guests on the May 29, 1955 airing of What's My Line? Fred Allen guessed who they were. They appeared again as the Mystery Guests on July 16, 1961, and then on April 8, 1962, immediately after their mother had appeared as a contestant. In 1958, their mother appeared as a guest challenger on the television game show To Tell the Truth. In December 1958 they appeared and performed as themselves in Season 4, Episode 11 of The Phil Silvers Show, "Bilko Presents the McGuire Sisters".

The McGuire Sisters and the Andrews Sisters met several times during their careers. Phyllis credited Patty, Maxene, and LaVerne Andrews during a television interview with Maxene in the 1990s, hosted by Sally Jessy Raphael, saying that her sisters and she met the Andrews Sisters in New York in the early 1950s and received important advice. The McGuires moved when they sang, often executing dance routines in lavish production numbers on countless television specials. The Andrews Sisters performed similarly in films in the 1940s, and were the first female vocal group to move when they sang, rather than just standing at a microphone. The sisters had mimicked that style, as well as those of the Mills Brothers and the Dinning Sisters ever since they were young, when they would perform short shows for family and friends in their parents' living room. Phyllis McGuire recounted that she and her sisters did not know any popular songs when they became famous, only the hymns taught to them by their mother. The trio imitated other singing groups long before their success.

They performed for five Presidents of the United States: Richard Nixon, Gerald Ford, Jimmy Carter, Ronald Reagan, and George H. W. Bush. They also performed for Queen Elizabeth II. In London they performed a set for the Royal Variety Performance of 1961.

During the 1960s, the sisters maintained a busy television schedule, making frequent appearances on popular variety programs hosted by Ed Sullivan, Dean Martin, Danny Kaye, Milton Berle, Andy Williams, Perry Como, and Red Skelton. The trio was dressed and coiffed identically, and performed synchronized body movements and hand gestures with military precision. Their recordings of "Sincerely", "Picnic", and "Sugartime" all sold more than one million copies.

== End to the group's public appearances ==
They retired from public appearances in 1968, giving their last performance that year on The Ed Sullivan Show. Phyllis McGuire continued to perform solo for a time. The demise of the group is often attributed to Phyllis' long-standing personal relationship with mobster Sam Giancana (although for years she claimed that their friendship was strictly platonic), which reportedly led to the group's blacklisting.

During one of his 1960s court appearances for which Phyllis was subpoenaed, Giancana told reporters outside the courthouse, "Phyllis knows everything" about the rumored unethical behaviors of John F. Kennedy and his brother Robert. Giancana was shot in 1975 by an unknown gunman thought to be Dominic "Butch" Blasi, his closest confidante and right hand man of sorts.

Giancana asked CIA cut-out Robert Maheu to place a wire in Phyllis' room, as he suspected her of having an affair with comedian Dan Rowan. Although Maheu acquiesced, the device was not planted because the agent who had been given the task of planting it was arrested. Attorney General Robert F. Kennedy prohibited the prosecution of the agent and Maheu, who was soon linked to the wire attempt, at the CIA's request.

Phyllis resided for decades in a famously showcased mansion in Las Vegas, boasting its own beauty parlor, a swan moat, and a replica of the Eiffel Tower which actually rose through the home's roof. When asked by Barbara Walters during a 1980s ABC-TV 20/20 interview from within the mansion if any of the money to build the lavish home came from Giancana, Phyllis denied the suggestion, claiming that she invested heavily in oil when the sisters were at the height of their popularity. In the same interview, she acknowledged that her relationship with Giancana was in fact a love affair, saying, "When I met him, I did not know who he was, and he was not married, and I was an unmarried woman. And according to the way I was brought up, there was nothing wrong with that. And I didn't find out until sometime later really who he was, and I was already in love."

The sisters reunited in 1986, performing at Toronto's Royal York Hotel for the first time since their retirement. Numerous nightclub engagements followed in Las Vegas, Atlantic City, and New York City's Rainbow & Stars, showcasing the group and Phyllis' impersonations of Peggy Lee, Judy Garland, Pearl Bailey, Ethel Merman, and even Louis Armstrong. Additionally, in 1986, the sisters were celebrity panelists on The New Hollywood Squares in the lower center square, with the episodes airing from Oct 20 to Oct 24.

Singing their greatest hits as part of their act, they were also featured performing specialty numbers such as the frantic "I Love a Violin", the a cappella "Danny Boy", and a segment during which Phyllis retired backstage as Christine and Dorothy shared the spotlight playing a concert arrangement of "The Way We Were" on twin pianos. Other highlights in the act were a comical Trinidad-flavored tune, a soft rendering of "Memory" from Broadway's Cats, and a "Money Medley", which they also performed live on the Jerry Lewis MDA Telethon in 1994. Since then, the sisters had made occasional public appearances together, including in 2004, when they reunited to perform in a PBS special Magic Moments: Best of '50s Pop. The sisters' command of their vocal cords and harmonious blend, perhaps the most impressive of any trio before or since, had not significantly diminished.

After their careers wound down, they opened a restaurant in Bradenton, Florida, calling it McGuire's Pub.

== Legacy ==
They were inducted into the National Broadcasting Hall of Fame in 1994, and in 2001, they were inducted into the Vocal Group Hall of Fame. They also have been inducted into the Coca-Cola Hall of Fame and the Headliners' Hall of Fame. They were inducted into the Hit Parade Hall of Fame in 2009. AllMusic said: "The mere mention of the name the McGuire Sisters evokes images of '50s America and comfortable, white middle-class life and aspirations. Their work was the perfect musical embodiment of the popular white culture of the period, of a piece with Snooky Lanson and Gisele MacKenzie on Your Hit Parade, and Dwight Eisenhower's America. They even came from a place called Middletown."

== Family ==
Christine was married six times. Her first marriage to Harold Ashcraft (1942 until August 16, 1950) she had two children, Herold and Asa. Christine later married John Henry Teeter (December 30, 1952 until December 18, 1962), Robert Hugh Spain (December 12, 1967 until 1970), Guy Marks (from 1975 until unknown), George Rosenfeld (from ?? until his death on August 23, 1996), and David Mudd (2002 until his death on August 19, 2011). All the latter marriages remained childless.

Christine's grandson, Army Cpl. Evan Asa Ashcraft, aged 24, was killed in Iraq in 2003, when the convoy he was traveling in came under fire.

On July 30, 1951, Dorothy married Sgt. John Henry Brown, whom she divorced on January 9, 1956. During their childless marriage, Dorothy was romantically linked with singer Julius La Rosa. On December 6, 1958, she married Lowell James Williamson, with whom she had two sons, Rex and David.

In November 1952, Phyllis married Cornelius (Neal) Anthony Burke Van Ells. They divorced in 1956. She had no children.

== Deaths ==
On September 7, 2012, Dorothy McGuire died at her son's home in Paradise Valley, Arizona, after suffering from Parkinson's disease and age-related dementia; she was 84. Dorothy's husband of 54 years, Lowell Williamson, died six months later on February 25, 2013, after sustaining a fractured back from a fall; he was 89.

Christine McGuire died in Las Vegas, Nevada, on December 28, 2018, at the age of 92. No cause of death was given.

Phyllis McGuire, the last surviving member of the trio, died at her estate in Las Vegas, Nevada, on December 29, 2020, of natural causes; she was 89.

== Discography ==
Year	Single (A-side, B-side) Both sides from same album except where indicated	Chart positions				Album
Year	Single (A-side, B-side) Both sides from same album except where indicated	US	CB	US AC	UK	Album
1953	"Picking Sweethearts" b/w "One, Two, Three, Four"	—	—	—	—	Non-album tracks
1953	"Toodle-Ooh Siana" b/w "Miss You"	—	—	—	—	Non-album tracks
1953	"Where Good Times Are" b/w "Hey, Mister Cotton Picker"	—	—	—	—	Non-album tracks
1953	"Are You Looking for a Sweetheart" b/w "You'll Never Know Till Monday"	—	—	—	—	Non-album tracks
1954	"Uno, Due, Tre (The Italian Square Dance)" b/w "Lonesome Polecat" (from Musical Magic)	—	—	—	—	Non-album tracks
1954	"Pine Tree, Pine over Me"	26	27	—	—	Non-album tracks
1954	"Cling to Me"	—	49	—	—	Non-album tracks
1954	"Goodnight, Sweetheart, Goodnight" b/w "Heavenly Feeling" (Non-album track)	7	8	—	—	By Request
1954	"Muskrat Ramble" (see below) b/w "Not As a Stranger" (Non-album track)	—	—	—	—	By Request
1954	"Muskrat Ramble"	10	9	—	—	By Request
1954	"Lonesome Polecat"	28	33	—	—	Musical Magic
1954	"Christmas Alphabet" b/w "Give Me Your Heart for Christmas"	25	34	—	—	Greetings from the McGuire Sisters
1955	"Sincerely"	1	2	—	14	By Request
1955	"No More"	17	—	—	20	By Request
1955	"Open Up Your Heart (and Let the Sun Shine In)" b/w "Melody of Love"	—	—	—	—	By Request
1955	"The Naughty Lady of Shady Lane" b/w "Hearts of Stone" (non-album track)	—	—	—	—	By Request
1955	"It May Sound Silly"	11	14	—	—	Chris, Phyllis, Dottie
1955	"Doesn't Anybody Love Me?"	flip	—	—	—	Musical Magic
1955	"Something's Gotta Give"	5	4	—	—	Chris, Phyllis, Dottie
1955	"Rhythm 'n Blues"	flip	32	—	—	Teenage Party
1955	"Kiss Me and Kill Me with Love" b/w "If It's a Dream"	—	—	—	—	Non-album tracks
1955	"He" b/w "If You Believe"	10	4	—	—	Greetings from the McGuire Sisters
1955	"Give Me Love"	95	30	—	—	Non-album track
1955	"Sweet Song of India"	—	34	—	—	Chris, Phyllis, Dottie
1955	"Be Good to Me"	—	46	—	—	Teenage Party
1955	"My Baby's Got Such Lovin' Ways"	—	40	—	—	Teenage Party
1955	"I'd Like to Trim a Tree with You" b/w "The Littlest Angel"	—	—	—	—	Greetings from the McGuire Sisters
1956	"Missing" b/w "Tell Me Now" (non-album track)	44	36	—	—	Musical Magic
1956	"Picnic"	13	20	—	—	Chris, Phyllis, Dottie
1956	"Delilah Jones"	37	36	—	24	Chris, Phyllis, Dottie
1956	"Weary Blues"	32	42	—	—	Sugartime
1956	"In the Alps"	63	—	—	—	Sugartime
1956	"Ev'ry Day of My Life"	37	33	—	—	Chris, Phyllis, Dottie
1956	"Endless"	52	36	—	—	Chris, Phyllis, Dottie
1956	"Goodnight, My Love, Pleasant Dreams" b/w "Mommy" (from Children's Holiday)	32	23	—	—	Musical Magic
1957	"Kid Stuff" b/w "Without Him"	—	36	—	—	Musical Magic
1957	"Blue Skies" b/w "He's Got Time" (from Greetings from the McGuire Sisters)	—	—	—	—	Do You Remember When
1957	"Please, Don't Do That to Me" b/w "Drownin' in Memories"	—	—	—	—	Teenage Party
1957	"Beginning to Miss You" b/w "Rock Bottom"	—	—	—	—	Teenage Party
1957	"Around the World In 80 Days" b/w "Interlude"	73	—	—	—	Sugartime
1957	"Kiss Them for Me" b/w "Forgive Me"	—	—	—	—	Sugartime
1957	"Santa Claus Is Comin' to Town" b/w "Honorable Congratulations"	—	—	—	—	Greetings from the McGuire Sisters
1957	"Sugartime" b/w "Banana Split"	1	7	—	14	Sugartime
1958	"Ding Dong" b/w "Since You Went Away to School"	25	43	—	—	Sugartime
1958	"Volare" b/w "Do You Love Me Like You Kiss Me"	80	—	—	—	May You Always
1958	"Sweetie Pie" b/w "I'll Think of You"	—	—	—	—	May You Always
1959	"May You Always" b/w "Achoo-Cha-Cha"	11	21	—	15	May You Always
1959	"Summer Dreams"	55	64	—	—	Sugartime
1959	"Peace"	85	97	—	—	May You Always
1959	"Red River Valley" b/w "Compromise" (Non-album track)	—	—	—	—	Showcase
1959	"Some of These Days" b/w "Have a Nice Weekend" (Non-album track)	—	—	—	—	Showcase
1960	"Livin' Dangerously" b/w "Lovers Lullaby"	97	—	—	—	Non-album tracks
1960	"Theme from The Unforgiven (The Need for Love)" b/w "I Give Thanks" (Non-album track)	—	—	—	—	Showcase
1960	"The Last Dance" b/w "Nine o'Clock" (Non-album track)	99	—	—	—	Showcase
1960	"To Be Loved" b/w "I Don't Know Why (I Just Do)"	—	—	—	—	Showcase
1961	"Just for Old Time's Sake" b/w "Really Neat" (Non-album track)	20	17	—	—	Just for Old Time's Sake
1961	"Tears on My Pillow" b/w "Will There Be Space in a Space Ship" (Non-album track)	59	55	12	—	Showcase
1961	"Just Because"	99	96	—	—	Showcase
1961	"I Do, I Do, I Do"	—	tag	—	—	Showcase
1961	"I'm Just Taking My Time" b/w "I Can Dream, Can't I?" (Non-album track)	—	—	—	—	Subways Are for Sleeping
1962	"Sugartime Twist" b/w "More Hearts Are Broken That Way"	107	130	—	—	Showcase
1962	"Mama's Gone, Goodbye" b/w "I Really Don't Want to Know"	—	—	—	—	Songs Everybody Knows
1963	"Summertime (Is the Time for Love)" b/w "Cordially Invited"	—	—	—	—	Non-album tracks
1964	"Now and Forever" b/w "Never"	—	—	—	—	Non-album tracks
1964	"Candy Heart" b/w "Dear Heart"	—	—	—	—	Non-album tracks
1964	"Ticket to Anywhere" b/w "I'll Walk Alone"	—	—	—	—	Non-album tracks
1966	"Truer Than You Were" b/w "Grazia"	—	—	30	—	Right Now!

=== Phyllis McGuire solo singles ===
Year	Single (A-side, B-side)	Chart positions			Album
Year	Single (A-side, B-side)	US	CB	US AC	Album
1964	"I Don't Want to Walk Without You" b/w "That's Life"	79	85	13	Non-album tracks
1964	"Just a Little Lovin'" b/w "You Don't Have the Heart to Tell Me"	—	—	—	Non-album tracks
1965	"Run to My Arms" b/w "Someone Else Is Taking My Place"	—	—	—	Non-album tracks
1966	"My Happiness" b/w "Vaya con Dios"	—	—	—	Phyllis McGuire Sings

== In popular culture ==
The McGuire Sisters, and most especially Phyllis McGuire, who lived in Las Vegas, were the subjects of the 1995 HBO movie Sugartime, which depicted a romantic relationship between Phyllis and mobster Sam Giancana. Giancana was played by actor John Turturro, and Phyllis was played by actress Mary-Louise Parker.

The Robert Altman film Come Back to the Five and Dime Jimmy Dean (1982) prominently features the music of the McGuire Sisters. Their number one single, "Sincerely", is lip-synced by the film's stars Cher, Karen Black and Sandy Dennis as "The Disciples of James Dean."

"Join the Club", the second episode of the sixth season of The Sopranos, references both the McGuire Sisters and Sam Giancana.
