= Broadway Records (1947) =

American record label founded in 1947

Broadway Records was a record label founded in 1947. Vincent Puccio Sr. founded the new label in Los Angeles. His brother, Gasper, played a key role in the early years and went on to found Houston Records in 1958. The Broadway disc label was maroon with silver script. Sometimes "Value" appeared under the cursive "Broadway". Value Hit Parade Tunes was another label owned by Puccio. Both labels were found on millions of 78s, 45s, and LPs. By 1989, with the emergence of the compact disc, Broadway Records was out of business. Both catalogues were sold to 108th Street Records.

It was unrelated to the previous record company of the same name.

== See also ==
- List of record labels
