= Herman Clebanoff =

American concert violinist and conductor

Herman Clebanoff (May 2, 1917 – January 13, 2004) was an American concert violinist and conductor.

== Background ==
Herman Clebanoff was born on May 2, 1917, in Chicago, Illinois, to his Russian immigrant parents. Starting violin lessons at the budding age of five, Clebanoff was seen as a child prodigy. Two years after receiving musical lessons, he had his first recital. Clebanoff's musical talents expanded throughout high school, when he acted as first chair violinist in a plethora of string quartets. Clebanoff was also an accomplished concertmaster. By the young age of 20, Clebanoff had already achieved the status of Concert Master for the Chicago Civic Orchestra's, as well as being the Chicago Symphony's youngest member.

== Personal life ==
Clebanoff met Helen Margolyne while he was part of the Illinois Symphony. She was a soprano with the Chicago Civic Opera. Clebanoff and Margolyne married in 1940, just years before the United States would enter the Second World War. Clebanoff and Margolyne have two daughters; Barbara Nufeld and Carol Zamir; a son, Jerry; six grandchildren, and six great-grandchildren. Clebanoff gave violin lessons to his granddaughter, Jennifer, who attended Boston University for medical school. Because of the distance and business, Jennifer would call Clebanoff and play violin over the phone. He would critique her and offer advice.

== Music career ==
Herman Clebanoff has been described as a passionate musician. His son, Jerry, stated, "He was a driven person. He didn't play to making a living. He played because he was passionate about it" (Chicago Times). In 1939, Clebanoff joined the Illinois Works Progress Administration, or WPA, Symphony. Clebanoff took this opportunity to play to a wide and varied group of audiences. Although he took a leave of absence in 1943 to work for the New Orleans Orchestra, Clebanoff returned to Chicago in 1945, where he produced a string orchestra of his own: The Clebanoff Strings. Many pieces were created in collaboration with this orchestra. In 1958 he issued his first LP with Mercury "Moods in Music" featuring musette and his "echoing" violin to great success. He then recorded several marvelous film themes LPs with songs such as: Secret Love (featured in "Calamity Jane"), "Song from "Raintree County", "Wild Is the Wind", "A Certain Smile", and "The High and The Mighty." Clebanoff's music inspired a global following due to his unique style and superb musicianship. Clebanoff also worked with other a musicians including fellow Chicagoan Caesar Giovannini, a superb pianist, and Wayne Robinson as arrangers. Clebanoff is known for his love of creating and producing new music as well. By the mid-1960s Clebanoff's music had shifted from strict film and classic pop music to more modern popular music (pop) with limited success. He left Mercury and recorded only one album for Decca... the superb "Once Upon a Summertime."

Clebanoff is known for his interest in creating new pieces. He frequently made time to create these pieces despite the chaos going on around him. "Two weeks after we moved, he recorded a record in Paris. He loved the opportunity to go other places" Jerry Clebanoff said (Chicago Tribune).

== Musical works ==
1958	Moods in Music	Mercury
1959	Songs from Great Films	Mercury
1959	Clebanoff Plays Songs from Great Operettas	Mercury
1960	Clebanoff Plays Great Songs of the Continent	Mercury
1960	Love Themes from Great Films	Mercury
1960	Today's Best Hits	Mercury
1961	King of Kings and 11 other great movie themes	Mercury
1962	Strings Afire	Mercury
1962	Accent on Strings	Mercury
1963	Today's Best Hits	Mercury
1963	Lush, Latin & Bossa Nova Too!	Mercury
196_	The World's Great Waltzes	Mercury
1964	Country Music For People Who Don't Like Country Music	Mercury
1964	Strings Afire in Spain	Mercury
1964	A Film Concert By The Clebanoff Strings, Orchestra & Chorus	Mercury
1964	Teen Hits played the Clebanoff way	Mercury
1967	Like Paganini	Mercury
1974	Besame Mucho (EP)	JVC
