= Devil's Elbow (Doug Kershaw album) =

Studio album by Doug Kershaw
- Released: 1972
- Recorded: The Sound Shop, Nashville, Tennessee
- Label: Warner Bros.
- Producer: Buddy Killen

Doug Kershaw chronology
Swamp Grass (1972)	Devil's Elbow (1972)	Douglas James Kershaw (1973)

Devil's Elbow is a 1972 album by Doug Kershaw.

== Reception ==
The album was received as a swing towards psychedelic music. Stereo Review did not welcome Kershaw's move from Cajun fiddler to Nashville singer.

== Track listing ==
1. "Super Cowboy" (Joe Allen)
2. "Devil's Elbow" (Don Wayne)
3. "Get a Little Dirt on Your Hands" (Bill Anderson)
4. "Jamestown Ferry" (Bobby Borchers, Mack Vickery)
5. "Billy Bayou" (Roger Miller)
6. "Lou'siana Sun" (Doug Kershaw)
7. "You Don't Want My Love" (Roger Miller)
8. "Honky Tonk Wine" (Mack Vickery)
9. "Fisherman's Luck" (Doug Kershaw)
10. "Sally Was a Good Old Girl" (Harlan Howard)
11. "I Like Babies" (Doug Kershaw, Don Wayne)
12. "(Had Not Been For) My Sally Jo" (Doug Kershaw, Buddy Killen)

== Personnel ==
- Doug Kershaw - fiddle
- Jimmy Colvard, Johnny Christopher, Troy Seals - guitar
- Curly Chalker, Stu Basore - pedal steel
- Joe Allen, Tommy Cogbill - bass
- Bobby Emmons, Bobby Woods - keyboards
- Charlie McCoy - harmonica, tuba
- Bill Ackerman, Jerry Carrigan, Karl Himmel, Kenny Malone - drums
- Buddy Killen - percussion, arrangements
- The Jordanaires, Millie Kirkham - backing vocals

Technical

- Ernie Winfrey - engineer
- Ed Thrasher - art direction
- Kevin Smart - cover photography
