= Howie Richmond =

American music industry executive (1918–2012)

- Born: Howard Spencer Richmond; January 18, 1918; Queens, New York, United States
- Died: May 20, 2012 (aged 94) Rancho Mirage, California, US
- Occupations: Music publisher, music industry executive
- Years active: 1935–1990s
- Label: The Richmond Organization (TRO)

Howard Spencer Richmond (18 January 1918 — 20 May 2012) (Note: Howie Richmond used the pseudonyms "Jessie Cavanaugh," "Paul Campbell," and "Joel Newman" as a composer, arranger, and lyricist for published music.) was an American music publisher and music industry executive. He established The Richmond Organization, Inc. (TRO), one of the largest independent music publishing organizations in the world, and had a hand in commercializing and promoting many pop, folk and rock songs beginning in the 1940s.

== Life and career ==
=== Early life and public relations career (1918–1945) ===
Richmond was born in Queens, New York. His father, Maurice Richmond, was a music publisher (at Paull-Pioneer Music) and distributor. Richmond attended the Loomis Chaffee School from 1931 to 1935, graduating in 1935, and thereafter, the University of Pennsylvania. He began working in the music business in 1935, soon establishing his own press office in New York City to publicize clients who included Glenn Miller, Frank Sinatra, Dinah Shore, the Andrews Sisters, and Woody Herman. During World War II he served in the Army Air Corps, before helping Buddy Robbins to establish the Robbins Artist Bureau, later known as the American Artists Bureau.

=== Entry into music publishing (1945–1949) ===
In late June 1949, Richmond teamed up with H. Z. Roland, lyricist Carl Sigman, disk jockey Gene Rayburn and British musician Billy Whitlock to form a music publishing company. The purpose of the new venture was to publish Sigman and Rayburn's new lyrics to the song "Scotch Hot, Hopscotch Polka", which had been composed and recorded in England by Whitlock for British Decca Records. Richmond was not originally one of the partners in the company, but was brought in to handle the publicity. Named Cromwell Music, Inc., the company setup in an office at 119 West 57th Street in New York and affiliated itself with the performance rights organization American Society of Composers, Authors and Publishers. "Hop-Scotch Polka" was officially published on July 6, 1949 and was quickly recorded by Guy Lombardo for Decca Records, Art Mooney for M-G-M Records, The Three Suns for RCA-Victor and Bill Gale for Columbia Records; it was a hit.

In September 1949, Bob Baumgart was hired as Cromwell Music's East Coast contact man. In October 1949, Bob Stern was hired as West Coast contact man and Saxie Dowell for the Midwest, based in Chicago. In November, Lucky Wilber replaced Bob Stern for West Coast representation. Cromwell Music followed up with the No. 1 hit "Music! Music! Music!", written by Stephan Weiss (Note: Stephan Rudolph Weiss (17 August 1899 Vienna, Austria – 13 August 1984 Zürich, Switzerland); also spelled Stefan Weiß.) and Bernie Baum, and recorded by Teresa Brewer.

=== Founding of Cromwell Music and early successes (1949–1951) ===
In early February 1950, Richmond bought out H. Z. Roland's and Carl Sigman's interests in Cromwell Music and became sole owner of the firm. Richmond rapidly expanded the company and formed several other publishing imprints, affiliated with both ASCAP and BMI. In June 1950, he formed his second music publishing company, Spencer Music, Inc. (the company name was his middle name), and affiliated with Broadcast Music, Inc. He named Peter Kameron as professional manager and Lucky Wilber as West Coast representative of Spencer Music. He also moved his offices to a bigger location at 129 West 52nd Street in New York.

=== Expansion of affiliated publishing companies (1950–1953) ===
In September 1950, Richmond formed his third music publishing company, Warwick Music, Inc., affiliated with ASCAP. Only a month later, however, Warwick Music, Inc. was renamed Essex Music, Inc. due to the existence of another already existing, unrelated Warwick Music, Inc. music publishing firm. In October 1950, he formed his fourth music publishing company, Hollis Music, Inc., which was affiliated with BMI. Loring Buzzell, former employee of Irving Mills' Mills Music, Inc., was named professional manager in charge of Hollis Music. In December 1950, Richmond co-acquired the music publishing company, Folkways Music Publishers, Inc., with Pete Seeger and other members of The Weavers (credited as Paul Campbell). Folkways Music Publishers was tied to BMI and assigned to professional manager Peter Kameron (who also managed The Weavers) and West Coast representative Lucky Wilber.

=== International ventures and new imprints (1953–1956) ===
Also in December 1950, Richmond welcomed Al Brackman (Note: Al Brackman (né Alexander Brackman; 1912–1992) graduated from James Madison High School in Brooklyn in June 1929. He was a nephew of the artist Robert Brackman (1898–1980). Through his aunt Betty Brackman Lottman (1902–1988) — who married George Dewey Lottman (1899–1942), lyricist of "Anchors Aweigh" — he was also a cousin of the author Herbert Lottman (1927–2014) and the film editor Evan A. Lottman (1931–2001).) as general professional manager of Hollis Music and general manager of all BMI affiliates, the later officially stepped into the position on January 2, 1951. In January 1951, Richmond renamed Spencer Music, Inc. to Ludlow Music, Inc. In March 1951, Richmond formed another imprint, Dartmouth Music, Inc. mainly for the purpose of accommodating foreign compositions in the United States. Dartmouth was eventually linked to ASCAP in July 1951 and Richmond placed Loring Buzzell as general professional manager of the company. Also in 1951, the Richmond firms moved to an even bigger office, located at 666 Fifth Avenue, Midtown Manhattan. In March 1951, Richmond began working on establishing music publishing firms in the United Kingdom and Europe. In September 1951, he went abroad intending to form Cromwell Music, Ltd., based in London, England, and Éditions Cromwell, based in France, but the companies stalled.

In 1952, Richmond formed his own record label, Mars Records, which was co-operated with musician Woody Herman. In April 1952, Richmond formed a country music publishing imprint named Melody Trails, Inc., tied with BMI. Melody Trails officially launched in September 1952 and was based in Nashville, Tennessee and managed by Vic McAlpin. In 1953, the companies moved to yet another bigger headquarters, located at 151 West 46th Street, New York, where they would remain for several years. In August 1955, Richmond finally formed a British imprint, Essex Music, Ltd. based in London, England to administer the publishing of songs in the British Empire and to facilitate the licensing of American songs overseas. He named David Platz as professional manager of Essex Music, Ltd., who started the job on September 1, 1955. Cromwell Music, Ltd., which had originally been planned to launch in England in 1951, was finally launched in June 1956. Platz was named general manager of Cromwell Music, Ltd. Loring Buzzell left the Richmond organization in October 1955 and went on to form his own music publishing company Hecht-Lancaster & Buzzell Music.

=== Formation of The Richmond Organization (TRO) and 1950s folk revival ===
In the late 1950s, Richmond restructured the firm under the umbrella company name of The Richmond Organization (commonly abbreviated as TRO), successfully attracting writers providing songs and record producers looking to find them. One key to Richmond's expansion was his emphasis on promoting records through radio stations and their disc jockeys, rather than on promoting songs through live performances. In the early 1950s, Richmond had particular success through promoting the songs and work of folk performers, notably Lead Belly (Huddie Ledbetter), Woody Guthrie and The Weavers, who included Pete Seeger. Richmond promoted the Weavers' version of Lead Belly's song "Goodnight Irene" by sending copies of the record to disc jockeys across the US – a technique that had not been widely used before – and the result was sales of over 250,000 sheet music copies and 500,000 records. Richmond also worked closely with Woody Guthrie, providing him with a tape recorder to record his songs, many of which subsequently became commercially successful. Another song that was successfully published and promoted by Richmond was "Kisses Sweeter Than Wine", first performed and recorded by The Weavers and later a hit for Jimmy Rodgers. The song was copyrighted in the names of Joel Newman and Paul Campbell, both pseudonyms used by Richmond, though Pete Seeger later claimed that its tune was derived from a traditional Irish melody, modified by Lead Belly, with new lyrics by Seeger and Lee Hays. Similar concerns over authorship have also been expressed in relation to "The Lion Sleeps Tonight", otherwise known as "Wimoweh", on which "Paul Campbell" is credited as co-writer.

=== Pop, folk, and rock successes of the 1960s and 1970s ===
Throughout the 1950s and 1960s, many of the pop songs published by Richmond found success. These included "I Believe", "Fly Me to the Moon", "As Long As He Needs Me", "What Kind of Fool Am I?", and "Those Were the Days", as well as songs initiated by Ledbetter, Guthrie, Seeger and others such as "If I Had a Hammer", "Rock Island Line", "We Shall Overcome" and "Turn! Turn! Turn!". He increasingly developed the company's interests outside of the United States, working with English and French songwriters such as Lionel Bart, Anthony Newley, Leslie Bricusse and Charles Aznavour. In the 1960s and 1970s, he developed links with writers such as Shel Silverstein and, through the subsidiary company Essex Music, British rock musicians including Pink Floyd, The Who, David Bowie, The Moody Blues and Black Sabbath.

=== Founding of the National Academy of Popular Music (1969) ===
In 1969, together with Johnny Mercer and Abe Olman, Richmond co-founded the National Academy of Popular Music (NAPM) and the Songwriters’ Hall of Fame to honor songwriters for their contributions to popular music. In 1983, he received the Songwriters Hall of Fame's first ever Abe Olman Publisher of the Year Award. Richmond continued as chairman of the board of The Richmond Organization and The Essex Music Group, although from the 1990s active control was in the hands of his sons, Larry and Frank Richmond.

=== Death ===
Richmond died at his home in Rancho Mirage, California, on May 20, 2012.

== Richmond Organization subsidiaries and imprints (former and current) ==
Active New York entities (as of January 2015)

- Parent company: The Richmond Organization, Inc.
- Cromwell Music, Inc.
- Cheshire Music, Inc.
- Connaught Music, Inc.
- Devon Music, Inc.
- Essex Music, Inc.
- Essex Music International, Inc.
- Folkways Music Publishers, Inc.
- Hampshire House Publishing Corp.
- Hollis Music, Inc.
- Ludlow Music, Inc.
- Melody Trails, Inc.
- Samuel Bronston Music Publishing, Inc.
- Songways Service, Inc.
- Spencer Music Corporation
- Total Music, Inc.
- Total Music Services, Inc.
- T. R. O., Inc.
- MusCadet Productions, Inc.
- Musical Comedy Productions, Inc.
- Workshop Productions, Inc.
- Worldwide Music Services, Inc.

Active New York not-for-profit corporation

- Anita B. and Howard S. Richmond Foundation, Inc. 501(c)3

Inactive California entity

- TRO-Palm Valley Music, Inc. (dissolved)

Status not known

- Dartmouth Music, Inc.
- Manchester
- Riverside Drive Music, Inc.
- Words and Music, Inc.

== People ==
- Loring Buzzell (1927–1959)
- David Platz (1929–1994)

== Bibliography ==
=== References ===
- Billboard. ISSN 0006-2510.
1. "Cromwell Now All Richmond's". Vol. 62, No. 6. February 11, 1950. p. 14 – via Google Books.
2. "Richmond Lets Bygones Be". Vol. 62, no. 44. November 4, 1950. p. 20 – via Google Books.
3. "Richmond Inks Ludlow, Hollis 50G BMI Deal". Vol. 63, no. 14. April 7, 1951. p. 11 & 40 – via Google Books.
4. "Richmond to Start Europe Pub Branches". Vol. 63, no. 37. September 15, 1951. pp. 15 & 19 – via Internet Archive.
5. "Richmond to Start Europe Pub Branches". Vol. 63, no. 37. September 15, 1951. pp. 15 & 19 – via Google Books.
6. "Buzzell Ties with Hecht & Lancaster". Vol. 69, no. 11. March 16, 1957. p. 18 – via Google Books.
- Biography Index. ("A Cumulative Index to Biographical Material in Books and Magazines"). Bea Joseph (aka Rebecca Joseph; 1899–1988); Charlotte Warren Squires (née Charlotte Eldridge Warren; 1895–1984) (eds.). New York: H.W. Wilson Company. 1953. (see Biography Index), LCCN 92-644359 (CD ROM ed.), LCCN 47-6532 (print ed.); ISSN 0006-3053, ISSN 1063-3286 (CD ROM ed.); OCLC 867588719 (all editions).
1. Vol. 2, August 1949 – August 1952: "Richmond, Howard S". p. 815.
  1. Via HathiTrust – via HathiTrust (University of Michigan).
  2. Via Internet Archive – via Internet Archive.
- Continuum Encyclopedia of Popular Music of the World (1st phase: 8 Vols.). John Shepherd (born 1947); David Horn (born 1942) (eds.). Continuum International Publishing Group. 2003. LCCN 2002-74146; ISBN 978-0-8264-6321-0, 0-8264-6321-5 (Vol. 1); OCLC 276305981 (all editions).
1. Sanjek, David (1952–2011). Vol. 1: "Media, Industry and Society". Part II, Chapter 15: "Publishing": "The Richmond Organization". pp. 590–591.
  1. Via Internet Archive (limited preview; Trinity Library).
  2. Via Google Books (limited preview).
- Cash Box. New York: Cash Box Publishing Company, Inc. – via Internet Archive (College of William & Mary Libraries, Special Collections Research Center). OCLC 55023069; ISSN 0008-7289; OCLC 1553471 (all editions).
1. "Howie Richmond Forms New BMI Firm via 'Goodnight Irene'". Vol. 11, no. 41. July 8, 1950. p. 16.
2. Full-Page Ad. Vol. 12, no. 26. March 24, 1951. p. 16.
3. "Folk and Western Roundup" – "Howie Richmond". Vol. 13, no. 45. August 2, 1952. p. 30.
4. "Platz to Head Essex Music, Ltd.". Vol. 16, no. 49. August 27, 1955. p. 30.
- Catalogue of Copyright Entries. Third Series. Library of Congress. Copyright Office. U.S. Government Printing Office – via Internet Archive (U.S. Copyright Office). Retrieved April 26, 2021. LCCN 06-35347.
1. "Unpublished Music".
  1. January–June 1950: Vol. 4, Part 5B, No. 1.
  2. January–June 1951: Vol. 5, Part 5B, No. 1.
2. "Published Music".
  1. January–June 1953: Vol. 7, Part 5A, No. 1.
    1. "Claimant Index" – "Melody Trails, Inc.". p. 471.
- Da Capo Best Music Writing 2001. Nick Hornby (guest editor), Benjamin G. Schafer (series editor). Da Capo Press. 2001. LCCN 2001-238193; ISSN 1546-4067; ISBN 978-0-3068-1066-4, 0-3068-1066-2; OCLC 45300599 (all editions); OCLC 18916883 (all editions).
1. Malan, Rian. "In the Jungle" (pp. 59–87) → Part II (of IV): "A Story About Money" (pp. 71–75).
  1. Via Internet Archive (limited preview; Kahle/Austin Foundation).
  2. Via Internet Archive (limited preview; ARChive of Contemporary Music).
- Desert Sun (The); Fessier, Bruce (21 May 2012). "Music Industry Titan, Philanthropist Howie Richmond Dies". Vol. 85, no. 218. Palm Springs, California. pp. 1 & 2 (section A). LCCN sn92-70115; OCLC 26432381 (all editions).
1. Via Newspapers.com.
2. Via ProQuest 1014424679 (U.S. Newsstream database).
- HuffPost; Sigman, Michael (May 28, 2012). "Howie Richmond (1917–2012): Music Publishing Pioneer With a Big Heart". Archived from the original on October 24, 2022.
- Malan, Rian (January 2004). Marks, David (ed.). "Where Does The Lion Sleep Tonight?". Durban, South Africa: 3rd Ear Music: Hidden Years Music Archive. Archived from the original on April 4, 2004. OCLC 870124401 (article).
1. Originally published → (May 14, 2000). "In the Jungle: Inside the Long, Hidden Genealogy of 'The Lion Sleeps Tonight' – How American Music Legends Made Millions off the Work of a Zulu Tribesman Who Died a Pauper". Rolling Stone. No. 841. pp. 54–58, 61–62, 64–66, 84–85. ISSN 0035-791X (publication).
  1. Via Rolling Stone blog. Archived from the original on November 25, 2020.
  2. Via ProQuest 2549074714 (The Rolling Stone Archive database).
- New York Times (The). LCCN sn00-61556; ISSN 0362-4331, ISSN 1553-8095 (online).
1. "Maurice Richmond Dead at 85; Music Publisher and Distributor". Vol. 114, no. 39218 (Late City ed.). June 9, 1965. p. 47 (columns 2–3, bottom).
  1. Via NYTimes blog.
  2. Via TimesMachine.
  3. Pdf via TimesMachine (PDF).
  4. Permalink via TimesMachine.
- Seeger, Pete (1993). Blood, Peter (ed.). Where Have All the Flowers Gone: A Singer's Stories, Songs, Seeds, Robberies. Bethlehem, Pennsylvania: Sing Out Corporation. p. 64. LCCN 93-8352; ISBN 978-1-8813-2201-6, 1-8813-2201-7; OCLC 28150656 (all editions).
1. Via Google Books (preview unavailable; snippet view only).
- Songwriters Hall of Fame.
1. "Exhibit: Howard S. Richmond" – "Bio". Archived from the original on November 25, 2025.
2. "Special Awards: Abe Olman Publisher Award" – "About". Archived from the original on September 5, 2025.
Richmond received the Abe Olman Publish Award in 1985.
- Variety (weekly) – via Internet Archive (Media History Digital Library). Retrieved April 26, 2021. LCCN 76-646510; ISSN 0042-2738; OCLC 5250629 (all editions).
1. "Trio Set Up Co. To Publish Odd Tune". Vol. 175, no. 8. August 3, 1949. p. 37.
2. Spencer Music Corp.'s Vertical Display Ad Promoting "Goodnight, Irene" (see "Goodnight, Irene"). Vol. 179, no. 7. July 26, 1950. p. 107.
3. "Richmond's 3D Firm to Avoid 'Bunching'". Vol. 180, no. 2. September 20, 1950. p. 43.
4. "Richmond Switches Tag". Vol. 180, no. 4. October 4, 1950. p. 48.
5. "Buzzell Pro Mgr. of New Richmond Firm". Vol. 180, no. 8. November 1, 1950. p. 43.
6. "Brackman Joins Richmond". Vol. 181, no. 3. December 27, 1950. p. 31.
7. "Millinder's Theatre Date Cross-Country Junket". Vol. 181, no. 8. January 31, 1951. p. 41.
8. "Weavers Show up at O. State Fair, but Are Nixed; Heidt Puts $ With AFM". Vol. 183, no. 12. August 29, 1951. pp. 49 & 52.
9. Dartmouth Music's Vertical Display Ad Promoting "Since My Love Has Gone". Vol. 185, no. 13. March 5, 1952. p. 57.
10. Howie Richmond Opens Fifth Firm Under BMI. Vol. 186, no. 9. May 7, 1952. p. 41.
11. "Orchestras-Music": "On the Upbeat" – "New York" – "Pete Kameron". Vol. 187, no. 7. July 23, 1952. p. 46.
12. "Indie Diskers Call Tune for Major 'Covers'". Vol. 200, no. 8. October 26, 1955. p. 40.
