= Arnold M. Auerbach =

American comedy writer

Arnold M. Auerbach (23 May 1912, in New York City, New York – 19 October 1998, in New York City, New York) was an American comedy writer, especially for radio, television and newspapers. Auerbach wrote radio and television scripts for Eddie Cantor, Milton Berle, Fred Allen, Frank Sinatra and Phil Silvers, among others. In 1946 he co-wrote the play Call Me Mister. In 1956 he shared a Primetime Emmy Award for Outstanding Writing - Comedy Series for The Phil Silvers Show. Auerbach contributed humor columns to The New York Times, and published a humorously styled novel, "Is That Your Best Offer?" (1971). He published the 1965 memoir Funny Men Don't Laugh about his collaborations with radio comedians.

Auerbach graduated from Columbia College, where he wrote for the Varsity Show, in 1932. He also received a master's degree of journalism from Columbia University.

He is named after his grandfather, rabbi Arnold Ehrlich. During the Second World War, Auerbach served in the Army Special Services division, writing skits for the musical comedy About Face.
