= Special Services (entertainment) =

Former US military entertainment branch

Special Services were the entertainment branches of the American military.

For the U.S. Army, the unit was created on July 22, 1940 by the War Department as part of the Army Service Forces. Special Services not only used its own specially trained and talented troops but also would often engage local performers. Among its activities were staging plays and stage acts, holding concerts, filming documentaries, and providing recreational opportunities for servicemen.

The Army's Special Services opened their first Recreational Officer school at Fort Meade Maryland on April 1, 1942. Special Services were one of the few Army units to be racially integrated during World War II.

Within the United States Marine Corps, the Special Services Division was the forerunner of today's Special Services Branch. It was formed on March 1, 1943, to provide morale maintaining recreational and informational services to Marine Corps personnel. As of at least 2004, the Special Services Branch was still active within the USMC.

== Roles ==
Roles within the Special Services (defined as Military Occupational Specialties) included that of Entertainment Specialist (03B), Physical Activities Specialist (03C), Crafts Specialist (03D), and Recreation Service Senior Sergeant (03Z).

== Special Service members ==
Some celebrities who served in Special Services include actors Burt Lancaster, Leonard Nimoy, Mickey Rooney, Don Knotts, and Sammy Davis Jr.; film director Anatole Litvak, bandleader Glenn Miller, tenor Mario Lanza, folk singer Peter Seeger, and baseball slugger Hank Greenberg.

Partial list

- Ian Abercrombie
- Philip Ahn
- Irwin Allen
- Keith Andes
- Desi Arnaz
- Ed Asner
- Humbert Allen Astredo
- Arnold M. Auerbach
- Albert Ayler
- Burt Bacharach
- Rey Marvin Baumel
- Harry Bellaver
- Tony Bennett
- Ken Berry
- James Best
- Joey Bishop
- Bobby Breen
- Mel Brooks
- William Browning
- Don Budge
- Red Buttons
- Sid Caesar
- Frank Capra
- Al Checco
- Dabney Coleman
- Broderick Crawford
- Bill Daily
- Vic Damone
- Philip D'Antoni
- Sammy Davis Jr.
- Bill Dickey
- Bob Dishy
- Melvyn Douglas
- Ruby Jane Douglas
- Andrew Duggan
- Clint Eastwood
- Lee Elder
- Gene Evans
- Maurice Evans
- Jamie Farr
- Bob Fosse
- Dan Frazer
- Phil Gersh
- Johnny Gilbert
- Frank Gorshin
- Dave Madden
- Carl Gottlieb
- Hank Greenberg
- Larry Hagman
- Ray Harryhausen
- John Michael Hayes
- Peter Lind Hayes
- Percy Helton
- Buck Henry
- Nat Hiken
- Sterling Holloway
- James Hong
- Rance Howard
- Jim Hutton
- Jules Irving
- Burl Ives
- David Janssen
- Werner Klemperer
- Richard Kline
- Don Knotts
- Burt Lancaster
- Mario Lanza
- Sol LeWitt
- José Limón
- Anatole Litvak
- Jerry Livingston
- Frank Loesser
- Joshua Logan
- Joe Louis
- Allen Ludden
- Mako
- Karl Malden
- Ralph Manza
- Johnny Marks
- Tony Martin
- Ron Masak
- Jody McCrea
- Don Messick
- Glenn Miller
- Roger Miller
- Martin Milner
- Rudy Ray Moore
- Howard Morris
- Jules Munshin
- Robert Nichols
- Leonard Nimoy
- Alex North
- Donald O'Connor
- Jack Paar
- Arthur Penn
- Nehemiah Persoff
- Paul Picerni
- Ted Post
- Lloyd Price
- Carl Reiner
- Bobby Riggs
- Phil Rizzuto
- Sugar Ray Robinson
- Mickey Rooney
- Mitch Ryan
- Lenny Schultz
- Pete Seeger
- Max Showalter
- Hal Smith
- Rip Taylor
- Dick Van Dyke
- Jerry Van Dyke
- Chick Vennera
- Fredd Wayne
- Hy Zaret

== In popular culture ==
On The Dick Van Dyke Show, the back story of the main character, Rob Petrie (Dick Van Dyke), included his post-war stint in Special Services, stationed in Texas near the Mexican border. A number of episodes dealt with this time period in flashbacks, showing his exploits as a boxer, how he met his future wife Laura (Mary Tyler Moore), a dancer with a touring show, their dating and wedding, and their close encounter with a Mexican divorce.
