= Jill Corey =

American popular standards singer (1935–2021)

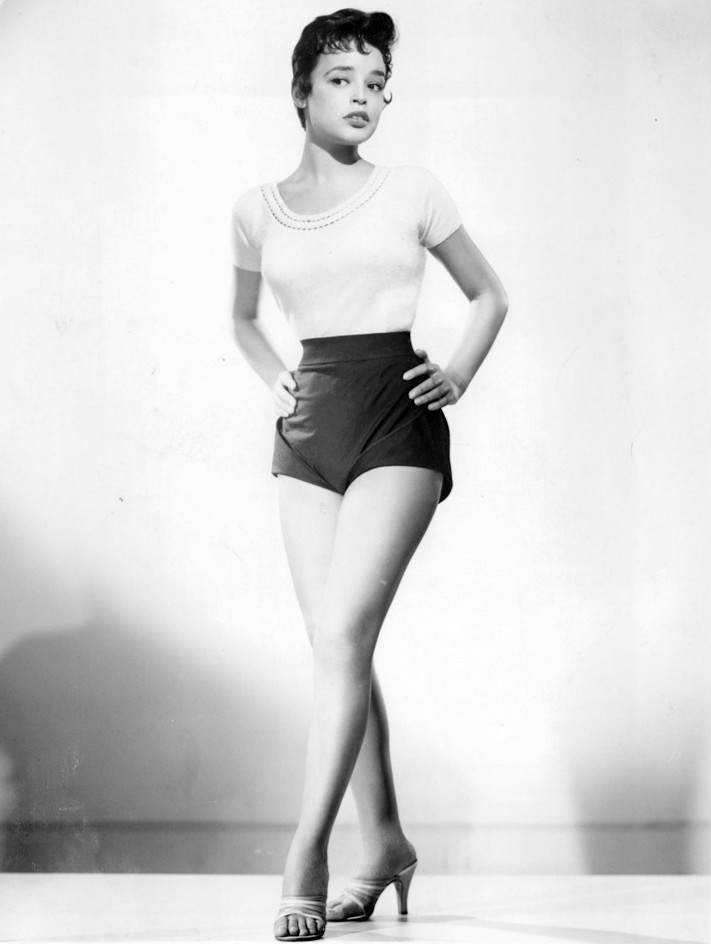
- Corey in 1955.

Background information
- Born: Norma Jean Speranza; September 30, 1935; Avonmore, Pennsylvania, U.S.
- Died: April 3, 2021 (aged 85) Pittsburgh, Pennsylvania, U.S.
- Genres: Traditional pop
- Website: jillcorey.net

Jill Corey (born Norma Jean Speranza; September 30, 1935 – April 3, 2021) was an American popular standards singer. She was discovered and signed on one day when she was 17. She went on to have her own radio shows and to star in a feature film.

== Biography ==
Italian-American, Corey was born in Avonmore, Pennsylvania, a coal mining community about forty miles east of Pittsburgh. Her father, Bernard Speranza, was a coal miner, and she was the youngest of five children. Her mother died when she was four years old.

She was a 1953 graduate of Bell-Avon High School. Corey began singing as an imitator of Carmen Miranda at family gatherings, on amateur shows in grade school, and contralto in the local church choir. At the age of 13, she began to develop her own style. She won first prize at a talent contest sponsored by the Lions Club, which entitled her to sing a song on WAVL in Apollo, Pennsylvania. This got her an offer to have her own program. By the age of 14 she was working seven nights a week, earning $5-$6 a night, with a local orchestra led by Johnny Murphy. By the age of 17 she was a local celebrity talent.

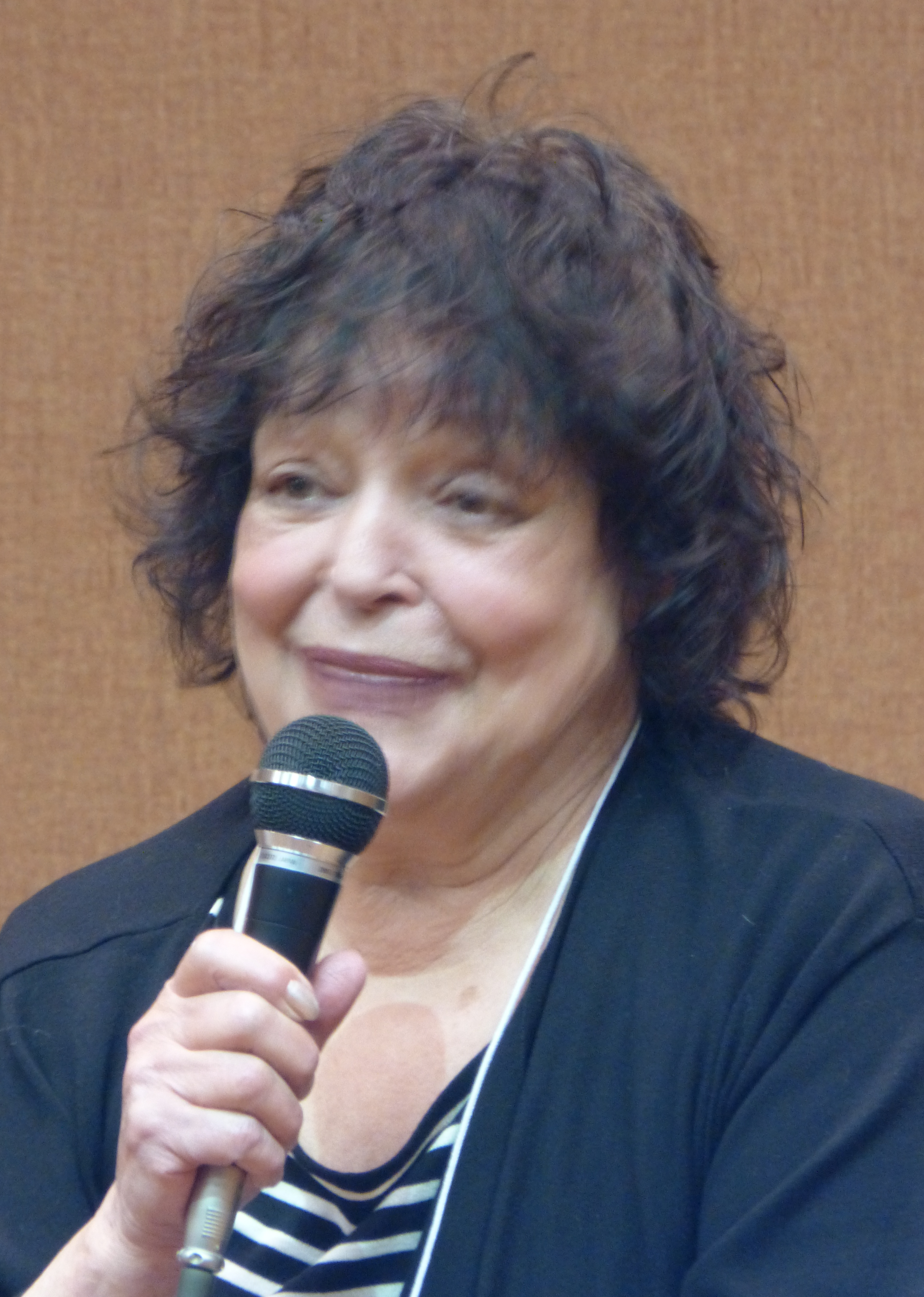
Corey in 2013

At the home of the only owner of a tape recorder in town, with trains going by in the background and no accompaniment, she made a tape recording to demonstrate her singing skills to the outside show business world. The tape came to the attention of Mitch Miller, who headed the artists & repertory section at Columbia Records. He normally received over 100 record demos a week, and this one, with a 17-year-old girl and its train background, would not have been likely to gain his attention. He telephoned her in Avonmore, and the next morning she flew to New York to be heard by Miller in a more normal studio setting. Miller had Life Magazine send over reporters and photographers, and had her audition with Arthur Godfrey and Dave Garroway. The Life photographers reenacted her signing a contract with Columbia, and all this happened in a single day, with her headed back to Avonmore that night.

Both Garroway and Godfrey called her, and it was her choice to pick one; she picked Garroway, who took the name Jill Corey out of a telephone book. Within six weeks the Life article, with a cover picture and seven pages, came out. Jill Corey became the youngest star ever at the Copacabana nightclub, where she was hit on by Frank Sinatra, and had numerous hit records. Even so, in May 1956, Billboard described Corey as a performer who "hasn't made it big" despite the amount of publicity she received.

Corey was a regular on the television variety programs Robert Q's Matinee (1950–1956), The Dave Garroway Show (1953–1954), and the 1958–1959 version of Your Hit Parade. She was co-host of Music on Ice, a variety program on NBC (1960).

She also worked on television with Ed Sullivan. In 1956 she became a regular on Johnny Carson's CBS-network comedy-variety show, replacing Carson's wife as the female singer. In addition, she had her own syndicated radio and television shows, like The Jill Corey Show hosted by the National Guard Bureau, the Jill Corey Sings radio show, and episodes of Stop the Music radio show. She also appeared at a Delta Gamma gathering in 1957, where she sang and greeted guests. She is known for her cover of a French song, "Let It Be Me", in 1957 for Columbia Records and her 1956 song, Egghead, which focuses on "failed masculinity" of an egghead. In 1959 she starred in a feature-length musical film for Columbia Pictures, entitled Senior Prom, which was co-produced by Moe Howard of The Three Stooges.

A two-CD compilation of her complete singles was released in June 2015 by Jasmine Records.

== Personal life ==
Corey suspended her career (Note: Whether she suspended her career might be questioned in light of the United Press International story about the wedding, which said, "The newlyweds will honeymoon in Hot Springs, Ark., and Bermuda where Miss Corey has singing engagements.") to marry Pittsburgh Pirates third baseman Don Hoak on December 28, 1961, in Pittsburgh. They had a daughter, Clare. Hoak died of a heart attack at age 41 after they had been married eight years. She then resumed her career in New York City.

Following the death of Hoak, she starred in plays on and off Broadway including Annie Get Your Gun, Sweet Charity, and played to a sold out crowd at Carnegie Hall in 1989.

An Associated Press article published in February 1973 pointed out the difficulties that Corey faced in attempting a comeback. "Today I don't know how to audition, how to get people interested in booking me," she said. Determined to succeed, she said, "Somehow, I'm going to find a way to tell people I'm back, and that I want to sing."

=== Death ===
Corey died on April 3, 2021, from septic shock in Shadyside Hospital, Shadyside (Pittsburgh), Pennsylvania, at age 85.

== Discography ==
=== Singles ===
- Robe of Calvary
- Minneapolis
- Cleo and Meo (with the Four Lads)
- Do You Know What Lips Are For? (with the Four Lads)
- A Good Night Kiss Is a Good Night's Work (with Percy Faith)
- One God
- He Is a Man (with Percy Faith)
- Where Are You? (with Percy Faith)
- Number One Boy . .
- I'm Not at All in Love
- Edward
- That's All I Need
- Come to Me for Everything
- Look Look (with Ray Conniff)
- Ching-Ching-a-Ling
- Nobody's Heart (with Ray Conniff)
- Cry Me a River (bigger hit for Julie London)
- First Love (with Buddy Cole)
- Wait for Tomorrow (with Buddy Cole)
- Summer Night
- Your Prayers Are Always Answered
- Let Him Know
- What Am I to Do?
- I Love My Baby (My Baby Loves Me) (US #28, 1957)
- Egghead
- Let It Be Me (US #57, 1957)
- Make Like a Bunny, Honey (US #95, 1957)
- Love Me to Pieces (her biggest hit) (US #18, 1957)
- Love
- I Feel Pretty
- How Can I Tell?
- Exactly Like You
- I Told a Lie to My Darlin'
- Give It All You've Got
- Uh Huh, Oh Yeah
- Sweet Sugar Lips
- Loveable
- Big Daddy (US #96, 1958)
- Wherefore Art Thou, Romeo?
- My Reverie 1958
- I Found a New Baby 1958
- Love Will Find Out the Way
- Dream Boy . .
- Have I Told You Lately that I Love You?
- The President Song
- Seems Like Old Times
- I Can't Hide a Mountain
- Have You Ever Been Lonely?
- I Gotta Have My Baby Back
- Lonely Life
- One Boy
- Ten Gallon Hat/Stick 'Em Up, Stuck up!
