= Burt Lancaster filmography =

Burton Stephen Lancaster (November 2, 1913 – October 20, 1994) was an American actor and producer. Initially known for playing tough guys with a tender heart, he went on to achieve success with more complex and challenging roles over a 45-year career in film and, later, television. He was a four-time nominee for the Academy Award for Best Actor (winning once), and he also won two BAFTA Awards and one Golden Globe Award for Best Lead Actor. The American Film Institute ranks Lancaster as #19 of the greatest male stars of classic Hollywood cinema.

Lancaster performed as a circus acrobat in the 1930s. After serving in World War II, the 32-year-old Lancaster landed a role in a Broadway play and drew the attention of a Hollywood agent. His breakthrough role was the film noir The Killers in 1946 alongside Ava Gardner. A critical success, it launched both of their careers. In 1953, Lancaster played the illicit lover of Deborah Kerr in the military drama From Here to Eternity. A box office smash, it won eight Academy Awards, including Best Picture, and landed a Best Actor nomination for Lancaster. In 1956, he starred in The Rainmaker, with Katharine Hepburn, earning a Best Actor Golden Globe nomination, and in 1957 he starred in Gunfight at the O.K. Corral with frequent co-star Kirk Douglas. During the 1950s, his production company, Hecht-Hill-Lancaster, was highly successful, with Lancaster acting in films such as: Trapeze in 1956, a box office smash in which he used his acrobatic skills; Sweet Smell of Success (1957), a dark drama today considered a classic; Run Silent, Run Deep (1958), a WWII submarine drama with Clark Gable; and Separate Tables (1958), a hotel-set drama which received seven Oscar nominations.

In the early 1960s, Lancaster starred in a string of critically successful films, each in very disparate roles. Playing a charismatic biblical con-man in Elmer Gantry in 1960 won him the Academy Award and the Golden Globe for Best Actor. He played a Nazi war criminal in 1961 in the all-star, war-crime-trial film, Judgment at Nuremberg. Playing a bird expert prisoner in Birdman of Alcatraz in 1962, he earned the BAFTA Award for Best Foreign Actor and his third Oscar nomination. In 1963, Lancaster traveled to Italy to star as an Italian prince in the epic period drama The Leopard. In 1964, he played a US Air Force general who, opposed by a colonel played by Kirk Douglas, tries to overthrow the president in Seven Days in May. Then, in 1966, he played an explosives expert in the western The Professionals.

In 1970, Lancaster starred in the box-office hit, air-disaster drama Airport. He experienced a career resurgence in 1980 with the crime-romance Atlantic City, winning the BAFTA for Best Actor and landing his fourth Oscar nomination. Starting in the late 1970s, he also appeared in television mini-series, including the award-winning Separate but Equal with Sidney Poitier. He continued acting into his late 70s, until a stroke in 1990 forced him to retire; four years later he died from a heart attack. His final film role was in the Oscar-nominated Field of Dreams.

== Film ==
=== As actor ===
| Year | Title | Role | Notes |
|---|---|---|---|
| 1946 | The Killers | Ole "Swede" Anderson | |
| 1947 | Brute Force | Joe Collins | |
| 1947 | Desert Fury | Tom Hanson | |
| 1947 | Variety Girl | Himself | |
| 1948 | I Walk Alone | Frankie Madison | |
| 1948 | All My Sons | Chris Keller | |
| 1948 | Sorry, Wrong Number | Henry Stevenson | |
| 1948 | Kiss the Blood Off My Hands | William Earle "Bill" Saunders | |
| 1949 | Criss Cross | Steve Thompson | |
| 1949 | Rope of Sand | Michael "Mike" Davis | |
| 1950 | The Flame and the Arrow | Dardo Bartoli | |
| 1950 | Mister 880 | Steve Buchanan | |
| 1951 | Vengeance Valley | Owen Daybright | |
| 1951 | Jim Thorpe – All-American | Jim Thorpe | |
| 1951 | Ten Tall Men | Sergeant Mike Kincaid | |
| 1952 | The Crimson Pirate | Capitan Vallo | |
| 1952 | Come Back, Little Sheba | Doc Delaney | |
| 1953 | South Sea Woman | Master Gunnery Sgt. James O'Hearn | |
| 1953 | From Here to Eternity | 1st Sergeant Milton Warden | New York Film Critics Circle Award for Best Actor; Nominated—Academy Award for Best Actor |
| 1953 | Three Sailors and a Girl | Marine | Uncredited |
| 1954 | His Majesty O'Keefe | Captain David O'Keefe / Narrator | |
| 1954 | Apache | Massai | |
| 1954 | Vera Cruz | Joe Erin | |
| 1955 | The Kentuckian | Elias Wakefield (Big Eli) | Director; Nominated—Golden Lion for Best Director |
| 1955 | The Rose Tattoo | Alvaro Mangiacavallo | |
| 1956 | Trapeze | Mike Ribble | Silver Bear for Best Actor at Berlin |
| 1956 | The Rainmaker | Bill Starbuck | Nominated—Golden Globe Award for Best Actor – Motion Picture Drama |
| 1957 | Gunfight at the O.K. Corral | Marshal Wyatt Earp | Laurel Award for Top Male Action Star |
| 1957 | Sweet Smell of Success | J.J. Hunsecker | |
| 1958 | Run Silent, Run Deep | Lieutenant Commander Jim Bledsoe | |
| 1958 | Separate Tables | John Malcolm | |
| 1959 | The Devil's Disciple | Reverend Anthony Anderson | |
| 1960 | The Unforgiven | Ben Zachary | |
| 1960 | Elmer Gantry | Elmer Gantry | Academy Award for Best Actor; Golden Globe Award for Best Actor – Motion Picture Drama; Laurel Award for Top Male Dramatic Performance; New York Film Critics Circle Award for Best Actor; Nominated—BAFTA Award for Best Actor in a Leading Role |
| 1961 | The Young Savages | ADA Hank Bell | |
| 1961 | Judgment at Nuremberg | Dr. Ernst Janning | |
| 1962 | Birdman of Alcatraz | Robert Stroud | BAFTA Award for Best Actor in a Leading Role; Volpi Cup for Best Actor; Nominated—Academy Award for Best Actor; Nominated—Golden Globe Award for Best Actor – Motion Picture Drama; Nominated—Laurel Award for Top Male Dramatic Performance |
| 1963 | A Child Is Waiting | Dr. Matthew Clark | |
| 1963 | The Leopard | Prince Don Fabrizio Salina | |
| 1963 | The List of Adrian Messenger | Animal Rights Protester (cameo) | |
| 1964 | Seven Days in May | General James Mattoon Scott | Nominated—Laurel Award for Top Male Dramatic Performance |
| 1965 | The Train | Paul Labiche | Nominated—Laurel Award for Top Male Action Performance |
| 1965 | The Hallelujah Trail | Colonel Thaddeus Gearhart | |
| 1966 | The Professionals | Bill Dolworth | |
| 1968 | The Scalphunters | Joe Bass | Nominated—Laurel Award for Top Male Action Performance |
| 1968 | The Swimmer | Ned Merrill | |
| 1969 | Jenny Is a Good Thing | Narrator | |
| 1969 | Castle Keep | Maj. Abraham Falconer | |
| 1969 | The Gypsy Moths | Mike Rettig | |
| 1970 | Airport | Mel Bakersfeld | |
| 1970 | King: A Filmed Record... Montgomery to Memphis | Himself | |
| 1971 | Lawman | Bannock Marshal Jared Maddox | |
| 1971 | Valdez Is Coming | Marshal Bob Valdez | |
| 1972 | Ulzana's Raid | U.S. Cavalry Scout McIntosh | |
| 1973 | Scorpio | Cross | |
| 1973 | Executive Action | James Farrington | |
| 1974 | The Midnight Man | Jim Slade | Co-director |
| 1974 | Conversation Piece | The Professor | David di Donatello for Best Actor; Fotogramas de Plata Award for Best Foreign Movie Performer |
| 1976 | 1900 | Alfredo Berlinghieri the Elder | |
| 1976 | Buffalo Bill and the Indians, or Sitting Bull's History Lesson | Ned Buntline | |
| 1976 | The Cassandra Crossing | Colonel Stephen Mackenzie | |
| 1977 | Twilight's Last Gleaming | General Lawrence Dell | |
| 1977 | The Island of Dr. Moreau | Dr. Paul Moreau | |
| 1978 | Go Tell the Spartans | Major Asa Barker | |
| 1979 | Zulu Dawn | Colonel Anthony Durnford | |
| 1980 | Atlantic City | Lou Pascal | BAFTA Award for Best Actor in a Leading Role; Boston Society of Film Critics Award for Best Actor; David di Donatello for Best Actor; Fotogramas de Plata Award for Best Foreign Movie Performer; Kansas City Film Critics Circle Award for Best Actor; Los Angeles Film Critics Association Award for Best Actor; National Society of Film Critics Award for Best Actor; New York Film Critics Circle Award for Best Actor; Nominated—Academy Award for Best Actor; Nominated—Genie Award for Best Performance by a Foreign Actor; Nominated—Golden Globe Award for Best Actor – Motion Picture Drama |
| 1981 | Cattle Annie and Little Britches | Bill Doolin, the Oklahoma outlaw | |
| 1981 | The Skin | General Mark Cork | |
| 1983 | Local Hero | Felix Happer | Nominated—BAFTA Award for Best Actor in a Supporting Role |
| 1983 | The Osterman Weekend | CIA Director Maxwell Danforth | |
| 1985 | Little Treasure | Delbert Teschemacher | |
| 1986 | Tough Guys | Harry Doyle | |
| 1987 | Control | Dr. Herbert Monroe | |
| 1988 | Rocket Gibraltar | Levi Rockwell | |
| 1988 | The Jeweler's Shop | The Jeweler | |
| 1989 | Field of Dreams | Dr. Archibald 'Moonlight' Graham | |

=== As producer ===
| Year | Film | Production company | Distribution Company | Awards |
|---|---|---|---|---|
| 1948 | Kiss the Blood off My Hands | Norma Productions / Harold Hecht Productions | Universal-International Pictures | |
| 1950 | The Flame and the Arrow | Norma Productions / Frank Ross Productions | Warner Brothers Pictures | Nominated—Academy Award for Best Dramatic or Comedy Score; Nominated—Academy Award for Best Color Cinematography |
| 1951 | Ten Tall Men | Norma Productions / Halburt Productions | Columbia Pictures | |
| 1952 | The First Time | Norma Productions / Halburt Productions | Columbia Pictures | |
| 1952 | The Crimson Pirate | Norma Productions | Warner Brothers Pictures | |
| 1954 | His Majesty O'Keefe | Norma Productions | Warner Brothers Pictures | |
| 1954 | Apache | Hecht-Lancaster Productions / Linden Productions | United Artists | |
| 1954 | Vera Cruz | Hecht-Lancaster Productions / Flora Productions | United Artists | |
| 1955 | Marty | Hecht-Lancaster Productions / Steven Productions | United Artists | Academy Award for Best Picture; Academy Award for Best Director; Academy Award for Best Actor in a Leading Role; Academy Award for Best Writing, Adapted Screenplay; Golden Globe Award for Best Actor – Motion Picture Drama; BAFTA Award for Best Foreign Actor; BAFTA Award for Best Foreign Actress; Bodil Award for Best American Film; Cannes Film Festival Palme d'Or; Cannes Film Festival OCIC Award; Directors Guild of America Award for Outstanding Directorial Achievement in Motion Pictures; National Board of Review Award for Best Film; National Board of Review Award for Best Actor; National Board of Review Award for Top Ten Films; New York Film Critics Circle Award for Best Film; New York Film Critics Circle Award for Best Actor; Writers Guild of America Award for Best Written American Drama; National Film Preservation Board National Film Registry; Nominated—Academy Award for Best Actor in a Supporting Role; Nominated—Academy Award for Best Actress in a Supporting Role; Nominated—Academy Award for Best Cinematography, Black-and-White; Nominated—Academy Award for Best Art Direction-Set Decoration, Black-and-White; Nominated—BAFTA Award for Best Film from any Source |
| 1955 | The Kentuckian | Hecht-Lancaster Productions / James Productions | United Artists | Nominated—Venice Film Festival Golden Lion |
| 1956 | Trapeze | Hecht-Lancaster Productions / Joanna Productions / Susan Productions | United Artists | Bambi Award for Best Actress - International; Berlin International Film Festival Silver Berlin Bear Award for Best Actor; Berlin International Film Festival Bronze Berlin Bear Award for Audience Poll; Nominated—Directors Guild of America Award for Outstanding Directorial Achievement in Motion Pictures |
| 1957 | The Bachelor Party | Hecht-Hill-Lancaster Productions / Norma Productions | United Artists | National Board of Review Award for Top Ten Films; Nominated—Academy Award for Best Actress in a Supporting Role; Nominated—BAFTA Award for Best Film from any Source; Nominated—Cannes Film Festival Palme d'Or |
| 1957 | Sweet Smell of Success | Hecht-Hill-Lancaster Productions / Norma Productions / Curtleigh Productions | United Artists | Bambi Award for Best Actor - International; National Film Preservation Board National Film Registry; Online Film & Television Association Award - Film Hall of Fame; Nominated—BAFTA Award for Best Foreign Actor; Nominated—Golden Laurel Award for Top Male Dramatic Performance; Nominated—Golden Laurel Award for Top Female Supporting Performance |
| 1958 | Run Silent, Run Deep | Hecht-Hill-Lancaster Productions / Jeffrey Productions | United Artists | Nominated—Golden Laurel Award for Top Cinematography - Black and White |
| 1958 | Separate Tables | Hecht-Hill-Lancaster Productions / Clifton Productions | United Artists | Academy Award for Best Actor in a Leading Role; Academy Award for Best Actress in a Supporting Role; Golden Globe Award for Best Actor – Motion Picture Drama; David di Donatello Award for Best Foreign Actress; Golden Laurel Award for Top Male Dramatic Performance; National Board of Review Award for Top Ten Films; New York Film Critics Circle Award for Best Actor; Sant Jordi Award for Best Foreign Actor; Nominated—Academy Award for Best Picture; Nominated—Academy Award for Best Actress in a Leading Role; Nominated—Academy Award for Best Writing, Screenplay Based on Material from Another Medium; Nominated—Academy Award for Best Cinematography, Black-and-White; Nominated—Academy Award for Best Music, Scoring of a Dramatic or Comedy Picture; Nominated—Golden Globe Award for Best Motion Picture – Drama; Nominated—Golden Globe Award for Best Actress – Motion Picture Drama; Nominated—Golden Globe Award for Best Supporting Actress; Nominated—Golden Globe Award for Best Director; Nominated—Golden Laurel Award for Top Female Dramatic Performance; Nominated—Golden Laurel Award for Top Female Supporting Performance; Nominated—New York Film Critics Circle Award for Best Film; Nominated—New York Film Critics Circle Award for Best Screenplay; Nominated—Writers Guild of America Award for Best Written American Drama |
| 1959 | The Rabbit Trap | Hecht-Hill-Lancaster Productions / Canon Productions / Anne Productions | United Artists | Locarno International Film Festival Award for Best Actor |
| 1959 | Cry Tough | Hecht-Hill-Lancaster Productions / Canon Productions / Anne Productions | United Artists | |
| 1959 | The Devil's Disciple | Hecht-Hill-Lancaster Films / Bryna Productions | United Artists | Nominated—BAFTA Award for Best British Actor |
| 1959 | Summer of the Seventeenth Doll | Hecht-Hill-Lancaster (Australia) Proprietary Limited | United Artists | |
| 1959 | Take a Giant Step | Hecht-Hill-Lancaster Productions / Sheila Productions | United Artists | Locarno International Film Festival Silver Sail Award; Nominated—Golden Globe Award for Best Supporting Actress; Nominated—Golden Globe Award for Best Film Promoting International Understanding; Nominated—BAFTA United Nations Award |
| 1960 | The Unforgiven | Hecht-Hill-Lancaster Productions / James Productions | United Artists | |
| 1960 | Elmer Gantry | Elmer Gantry Productions | United Artists | Academy Award for Best Actor in a Leading Role; Academy Award for Best Actress in a Supporting Role; Academy Award for Best Writing, Screenplay Based on Material from Another Medium; Golden Globe Award for Best Actor – Motion Picture Drama; Golden Laurel Award for Top Drama; Golden Laurel Award for Top Male Dramatic Performance; Golden Laurel Award for Top Female Supporting Performance; National Board of Review Award for Top Ten Films; National Board of Review Award for Best Actress; New York Film Critics Circle Award for Best Actor; Writers Guild of America Award for Best Written American Drama; Nominated—Academy Award for Best Picture; Nominated—Academy Award for Best Music, Scoring of a Dramatic or Comedy Picture; Nominated—Golden Globe Award for Best Motion Picture – DramaNominated—Golden Globe Award for Best Director; Nominated—Golden Globe Award for Best Actress – Motion Picture Drama; Nominated—Golden Globe Award for Best Supporting Actress; Nominated—BAFTA Award for Best Film from any Source; Nominated—BAFTA Award for Best Foreign Actor; Nominated—BAFTA Award for Best Foreign Actress; Nominated—Cahiers du Cinéma for Best Film; Nominated—Directors Guild of America Award for Outstanding Directorial Achievement in Motion Pictures; Nominated—Golden Laurel Award for Top Female Dramatic Performance; Nominated—New York Film Critics Circle Award for Best Film |
| 1961 | The Young Savages | Hecht-Hill-Lancaster Productions / Contemporary Productions | United Artists | |
| 1962 | Birdman of Alcatraz | Hecht-Hill-Lancaster Productions / Norma Productions | United Artists | BAFTA Award for Best Foreign Actor; Golden Laurel Award for Top Drama; Golden Laurel Award for Top Male Dramatic Performance; Golden Laurel Award for Top Female Supporting Performance; National Board of Review Award for Top Ten Films; Venice Film Festival Volpi Cup Award for Best Actor; Venice Film Festival San Giorgio Prize Award; Nominated—Academy Award for Best Actor in a Leading Role; Nominated—Academy Award for Best Actor in a Supporting Role; Nominated—Academy Award for Best Actress in a Supporting Role; Nominated—Academy Award for Best Cinematography, Black-and-White; Nominated—Academy Award for Best Actor in a Leading Role; Nominated—Golden Globe Award for Best Supporting Actor; Nominated—Directors Guild of America Award for Outstanding Directorial Achievement in Motion Pictures; Nominated—Writers Guild of America Award for Best Written American Drama; Nominated—Venice Film Festival Golden Lion |
| 1968 | The Scalphunters | Norlan Productions | United Artists | Nominated—Golden Globe Award for Best Supporting Actor Nominated—Golden Laurel Award for Top Male Supporting Performance; Nominated—Golden Laurel Award for Top Action Performance |
| 1971 | Valdez Is Coming | Norlan Productions / Ira Steiner Productions | United Artists | |
| 1974 | The Midnight Man | Norlan Productions | Universal Pictures | |

== Television ==
| Year | Title | Role | Notes |
|---|---|---|---|
| 1969 | Sesame Street | Himself | 3 episodes |
| 1974 | Moses the Lawgiver | Moses | Miniseries |
| 1978 | America 2-Night | Himself | Parody talk-show |
| 1978 | Victory at Entebbe | Shimon Peres | TV movie |
| 1978 | The Unknown War | Narrator | 20 episode USA-USSR archival documentary series on World War II |
| 1982 | Marco Polo | Teobaldo Visconti (Pope Gregory X) | Miniseries |
| 1982 | The Life of Verdi | Narrator (English version) | Miniseries |
| 1985 | Scandal Sheet | Harold Fallen | TV movie |
| 1985 | Circus of the Stars | Ringmaster/himself | Variety Special |
| 1986 | On Wings of Eagles | Colonel Arthur D. "Bull" Simons | Miniseries |
| 1986 | Fathers and Sons: A German Tragedy | Geheimrat Carl Julius Deutz | Miniseries |
| 1986 | Barnum | Phineas Taylor "P.T." Barnum | TV movie |
| 1989 | Cops | Narrator | Provided narration on pilot episode: "Broward County, Florida 1" |
| 1989 | The Betrothed | Cardinal Federigo Borromeo | Miniseries |
| 1990 | The Phantom of the Opera | Gerard Carriere | Miniseries; Nominated – Golden Globe Award for Best Actor – Miniseries or Television Film |
| 1990 | Voyage of Terror: The Achille Lauro Affair | Leon Klinghoffer | Miniseries |
| 1991 | Separate but Equal | John W. Davis | Miniseries |
