= Harold Hecht =

American film producer

- Born: June 1, 1907; New York City, U.S.
- Died: May 26, 1985 (aged 77); Beverly Hills, Los Angeles, California, U.S.
- Resting place: Pierce Brothers Westwood Village Memorial Park Cemetery, Los Angeles; 34.05845°N 118.44087°W
- Occupations: Film producer, dance director, talent agent
- Years active: 1923–1985
- Spouses: Gloria Joyce Buzzell (m. 1947–1960) Martine Millner (m. 1962–1974)
- Children: 6
- Relatives: Edward Buzzell (uncle-in-law); Loring Buzzell (brother-in-law; Lu Ann Simms (sister-in-law)
- Awards: Academy Award for Best Picture (1956); Palme d'Or (1955)

Harold Adolphe Hecht (June 1, 1907 – May 26, 1985) was an American film producer, dance director and talent agent. He was also, though less noted for, a literary agent, a theatrical producer, a theatre director and a Broadway actor. He was a member of the Academy of Motion Pictures Arts and Sciences and the Screen Producers Guild.

During his first stay in Hollywood in the early to mid-1930s, Hecht was one of the leading dance directors in the movie industry, working with the Marx Brothers, Mae West, Bing Crosby, Cary Grant, W. C. Fields, Gary Cooper, Maurice Chevalier and Marion Davies. In 1947, he co-founded Norma Productions, an independent film production company, with his business partner and managed actor Burt Lancaster. From 1954 to 1959, the Norma Productions subsidiaries Hecht-Lancaster Productions and later Hecht-Hill-Lancaster Productions, were the biggest and most important independent production units in Hollywood. Following the end of the Hecht-Hill-Lancaster partnership, Hecht continued as one of the top three independent producers in Hollywood, a position he shared with Stanley Kramer and the Mirisch brothers, for the next ten years.

At the 28th Academy Awards ceremony in 1956, Hecht received a Best Picture Oscar for the 1955 Hecht-Lancaster Productions film Marty. He was again nominated three years later at the 31st Academy Awards ceremony for the 1958 Hecht-Hill-Lancaster Productions film Separate Tables. The film did not win but Hecht did accept the Oscar for Best Supporting Actress in place of Wendy Hiller who could not be present. The Broadway play version of Separate Tables, produced by Hecht-Lancaster Productions, was nominated for the Best Play Award at the 11th Tony Awards ceremony in April 1957 In November 1959 Hecht was chosen by United States President Dwight Eisenhower to accompany the cultural exchange program committee in a trip to Russia when Marty was selected by the USSR as the first American film to be screened in that country since World War II.

Fourteen of Hecht's film productions (and an additional three on which he was a choreographer) have won and been nominated for several awards and prizes at various ceremonies and film festivals, including; Academy Awards, Golden Globe Award, British Academy Film Awards, Bodil Awards, Directors Guild of America Award, Writers Guild of America Award, National Board of Review Awards, New York Film Critics Circle Award, Laurel Awards, David di Donatello Award, Bambi Award and the Online Film & Television Association Award; and at the Cannes Film Festival, the Venice Film Festival and the Berlin International Film Festival. Four of the films Harold Hecht was associated with have been deemed "culturally, historically, or aesthetically significant" by the United States National Film Preservation Board and have been selected for preservation in the Library of Congress' National Film Registry; Duck Soup in 1990, Sweet Smell of Success in 1993, Marty in 1994 and She Done Him Wrong in 1996.

== Early life ==
Harold Adolphe Hecht was born on June 1, 1907, in Yorkville, New York City, to Joseph Hecht and Rose (née Loewy) Hecht. His father was born on November 17, 1882, in Austria. While employed as a sailor at the age of seventeen, he immigrated to New York City in January 1899. Once in New York he worked in construction and eventually made it up to the position of a building contractor. His mother was born on January 18, 1882, in Austria. Joseph and Rose were married in 1906 in New York City and had two children; Harold (born 1907) and Janet Hecht (b. 1910, later Janet Garfield, mother of Warren Garfield, a noted film trailer producer).

He attended PS 169, graduating in spring 1923 at the age of sixteen. Hecht is reported to have frequented the Union Settlement house on East 104th Street in East Harlem.

== Studies and Broadway career ==
Just as Hecht was looking for his vocation, the very field he wanted to be in was interviewing students for a new school. In November 1923, Richard Boleslavsky, a Russian immigrant and former student of Konstantin Stanislavsky, opened the American Laboratory Theatre, the first school in the United States to teach Stanislavski's system of acting. Hecht was among the first students accepted to attend the new school in late 1923. While there he studied and appeared in plays with Lee Strasberg (who later took Stanislavski's system and Americanized it into the method acting system), Stella Adler, Harold Clurman, Anne Revere, Lenore Romney and Francis Fergusson.

Hecht excelled at The Lab and was accepted into its Auxiliary Acting Group, granting him the privilege of appearing in the school's produced plays, while remaining under Boleslavsky's teachings beyond the two years required to graduate. While attending The Lab, Hecht appeared in The Straw Hat (October–November 1926), Big Lake (April 1927, from a story by Rollie Lynn Riggs), Much Ado About Nothing (November–December 1927), Dr. Knock (February–March 1928), Grand Street Follies (May–October 1928, with dances staged by James Cagney) and The Wild Duck (November 1928 – January 1929).

Many of The Lab's students worked on additional aspects of the plays that the school produced and Hecht was most drawn by choreography. He also worked under Boleslavsky, both in The Lab's productions and on other Broadway productions, as stage assistant. In 1929 Boleslavsky left for Hollywood and Hecht continued to attend The Lab headed by Maria Ouspenskaya and Maria Germanova.

After the American Laboratory Theatre closed in the spring of 1930, Hecht continued working on Broadway as either dancer or choreographer until late 1931. During this period he worked with Mikhail Mordkin, Martha Graham, George White and Albertina Rasch. He also worked on Les noces at the Metropolitan Opera.

== First Hollywood career ==
=== Beginning at RKO ===
In October 1931 Richard Boleslavsky invited Hecht to join him in Hollywood to choreograph the dance numbers on an upcoming project he was set to direct at RKO Radio Pictures. Chi Chi and Her Papas, a 1924 German comedic play originally written by Armin Friedmann and Fritz Lunzer under the title Sie und ihr Zimmerherr, had been translated into English by Max Steiner in a single day. Steiner also composed three original songs and the score for the film adaptation, while the movie's producer, William LeBaron, wrote the lyrics. Humphrey Pearson was brought in for additional dialogue but eventually re-wrote the entire screenplay. Chi Chi and Her Papas was to be a starring vehicle for actress Lili Damita, her third film at RKO. Her leading man was scheduled to be John Warburton, loaned out from Fox Films, with Hugh Herbert as a singing supporting character. Other supporting roles were scheduled for George Frank, Tiny Sandford and Gertrude Astor.

Hecht left by plane from New York City to Hollywood on Monday, November 2, his position on the film already confirmed. Once in California, he interviewed 200 girls and 150 men, in order to find the twelve girls and six men necessary for the dance numbers. Hecht hired Frances Grant (stage/screen name of the actress, dancer, and dance teacher Stella McCarron), fresh from assisting Larry Ceballos at Fanchon and Marco, to help him with the new routines on Chi Chi and Her Papas. But a week after Hecht's arrival, the film was put on hold. Earlier that fall, RKO had acquired the Pathé Exchange film studio and a number of issues had come of it. New studio head, David O. Selznick clashed with equally positioned Charles Rogers and similar arguments went on between producer William LeBaron and former vice-president Joseph I. Schnitzer. Not only were crew positions scheduled to be cut (as the two studios merged into a single location), but some of the pictures too were cancelled. As part of the agreement, all 20 Pathé pictures in production at the time of the acquisition were to be made at RKO's studio. However, the 16 films on RKO's production schedule were not given the same security and for a variety of reasons, Chi Chi and Her Papas was one of the few to get shut down. LeBaron had already spent $100,000 within the four weeks of pre-production but neither Selznick nor Schnitzer liked the idea of the film and felt it was too racy and non-conducive to the American taste.

A few weeks later Hecht found work in the Los Angeles theater business. LeRoy Prinz was producing and directing the Edmunt Joseph and Nat Perrin story Lucky Day with financial backing from Rodney Pantages, Arthur Silber and Harold Morehouse. Prinz had clashed with the original choreographer, Billy Grant and Hecht came in to replace him. Other crew members included Earl Dancer staging the choir with music by Otis René and Leon René and lyrics by Ben Eilleon. Lucky Day opened at the Mayan Theater in L.A. on December 27 starring Alex Lovejoy, Eddie Anderson, Alma Travers, LeRoy Broomfield and Aurora Greeley. The play was relatively successful, gaining interest from RKO as a potential property.

=== Contract choreographer at Paramount ===
In mid-March 1932 Hecht signed a one-year agreement and became a contract choreographer and dance director for Paramount Pictures. Stories exist that it was his friend Busby Berkeley who helped him get in touch with the right people at Paramount, where the two are said to have worked on films together. Hecht's first assignment at Paramount was directing two dance ensembles in the Marx Brothers' college football comedy film Horse Feathers. One of the numbers Hecht directed was I'm Against It, a scene where Groucho Marx, playing Quincy Adams Wagstaff, is first installed as the new headmaster of Huxley College. Hecht trained Groucho alongside twenty elder actors, aged 61 to 77 years old, with naturally grown beards and dressed in academic gowns. Considering that his first known assignment at Paramount Pictures was a Marx Brothers film, it is quite possible that Hecht found his way to that studio through Nat Perrin, whom he had just worked with on Lucky Day and was Groucho's close friend and collaborator. Hecht was reported to have worked on additional Marx Brothers films, though no specific titles have surfaced to confirm this (i.e.: "Hecht worked on Marx Brothers films", in plural form). If he did work on additional Marx Brothers films, the only plausible ones that were made during the remainder of his first venture in Hollywood were Duck Soup at Paramount in 1933 and A Night at the Opera at Metro-Goldwyn-Mayer in 1935. The exact shooting dates for Duck Soup have not been established, but it is known to have been filmed during the summer of 1933, after Hecht's contract at Paramount had expired. It is always possible that the studio reached out to Hecht, though no screen credits were provided for the dance numbers (no screen credits were provided for Horse Feathers either). As for A Night at the Opera, it was filmed at M-G-M Studio in the summer of 1935, during a time when Hecht was associated with the studio. However, the film gives screen credits to Chester Hale for the choreography. Whether Hale worked alone or if Hecht had any input in the film is unknown.

Following Horse Feathers, Hecht worked on Lady and Gent (at the time known under the title The Challenge), directed by Stephen Roberts and starring George Bancroft and Wynne Gibson, and Devil and the Deep, directed by Marion Gering and starring Tallulah Bankhead, Gary Cooper, Charles Laughton and Cary Grant. In June and July 1932, Hecht was loaned out from Paramount to M-G-M for the Marion Davies film Blondie of the Follies (then known under the title Good Time Girl). The film was produced by Davies who sought out Hecht herself and was directed by Edmund Goulding, who would later reunite with Hecht. The film also starred Robert Montgomery, Billie Dove and Jimmy Durante.

Immediately after Lucky Day, Hecht started working on the play Hullabaloo, which took several months of preparation. Hecht co-directed it with Paul Gerard Smith and choreographed the Gilmor Brown production. The production featured music by Ralph Rainger and lyrics by Don Hartman. Hullabaloo opened on May 26 at the Pasadena Community Playhouse and ran until June 19, with a cast featuring Sterling Holloway, Frank Atkinson, Leonard Sillman and his sister June Carroll.

In the fall of 1932, Hecht worked on another theater play, a revised and modernized version of Franz Lehár's operetta, The Merry Widow. The play was brought up to date by J. Keirn Brennan with dance numbers by Hecht and vocal numbers by H. L. Heidecker. Karl Hajos composed and conducted the 30-piece orchestra and the cast included Herbert Evans, Ruth Gillette, Alex Callam, Florinne McKinney, Franklin Record, Roland Woodruff, Diane Warfield, Paul Sauter, Rolloe Dix, William Jeffries, Harold Reeves and Evelyn Cunningham. The play opened on Monday November 14 at the Columbia Theater in California.

In late November 1932 Hecht became involved in a series of Mae West projects, which all eventually culminated into a single picture. Earlier that year Paramount had signed Mae West to a contract and the actress was eager to step up from the lower-billed role she received in her first picture, Night After Night. She was billed fourth, after George Raft, Constance Cummings and Wynne Gibson. West was working to adapt her notoriously banned play, Diamond Lil, into a film, initially titled Honky Tonk. But the censors objected and Paramount worked quickly to change a few scenes, re-title the film to Diamond Lil and tried again to get it into production. The censors objected again, Paramount went back to work and, hoping to fool the censors into thinking they were submitting an all-new film, re-titled the project Ruby Red. But the censors found far too many similarities between Ruby Red and Diamond Lil and blocked the production completely. West and Paramount decided to merge Ruby Red into another West film in the writing stages, She Done Him Wrong, using the cast and crew already hired for Ruby Red. This final version of the script made it into production. Producer LeBaron, who had left RKO to work for Paramount, hired Hecht to work on She Done Him Wrong back when it was still a separate entity from Ruby Red. Hecht was also hired for dance routines on Ruby Red. Ultimately, all of Hecht's material was merged into a single film and used on She Done Him Wrong. The film was directed by Lowell Sherman and starred West, Cary Grant, Owen Moore and Noah Beery. Hecht was interviewed by Motion Picture Magazine in 1933, in response to Mae West's media comments regarding "curvy women being the new trend", to which he answered in her favor; "Dangerous curves are not only ahead, but actually with us. Present-day chorus girls must be slightly more round and more curved than those of a few years ago. Girls with thin, boyish figures definitely are out."

Following the Mae West projects, Hecht became one of the more prominent choreographers in Hollywood and was well-in-demand at Paramount and other studios. In January 1933, Paramount scheduled Hecht for three of their upcoming features: A Bedtime Story (at the time known under the title The Way to Love), directed by Norman Taurog and starring Maurice Chevalier and Helen Twelvetrees, International House, directed by A. Edward Sutherland starring W. C. Fields, Bela Lugosi and George Burns and the highly anticipated blockbuster College Humor. College Humor, another William LeBaron production, was proclaimed by Paramount's publicity department as "the most lavish musical picture since the advent of talking pictures". The film was directed by Wesley Ruggles and starred Bing Crosby, Richard Arlen, Mary Carlisle, Jack Oakie, George Burns and Gracie Allen. In addition to working with the main stars, Hecht trained The Ox-Road Co-Eds, a group of sixty chorus line dancers, for several original music sequences. He teamed up with Jack Oakie and Boris Petroff to create a new dance, the Fraternity Stomp, which Oakie and Lorna Andre performed in the film. The new dance was well advertised in newspapers and magazines with a depiction of steps and moves for people to learn it at home.

Hecht later stated that he worked with director Frank Tuttle during his days at Paramount. Though no evidence has been found, it is likely that the film he was referring to was The Big Broadcast, starring Bing Crosby, Stuart Erwin, Leila Hyams and George Burns. The Big Broadcast was produced by Benjamin Glazer, who had written A Bedtime Story, and featured music by Ralph Rainger, who had also worked on A Bedtime Story and International House, as well as Hecht's play, Hullaballoo.

=== Loan-outs to RKO ===
Shortly before Hecht's Paramount contract expired, producer Lou Brock at RKO borrowed him to direct the dance numbers on the musical Melody Cruise (at the time known under the title Maiden Cruise). Hecht put together a number that included a line of 36 girls for the Mark Sandrich film starring Charlie Ruggles and Phil Harris. However, after two weeks of working on Maiden Cruise, Paramount recalled him claiming the RKO production had been delayed and that Hecht's work on Paramount's own International House was a priority. Dave Gould took over Hecht's work on the RKO film and received screen credits for the dance routines.

Once Hecht was free from his Paramount contract in April 1933, RKO hired him again, this time to direct the dance numbers on Bed of Roses, a film directed by Gregory La Cava starring Constance Bennett, Joel McCrea, Pert Kelton and John Halliday. For this picture, Hecht trained two hundred girls for the dances and selected the best nine to appear in the film. One number in particular, which took place at the New Orleans Mardi Gras carnival in the film, was taken on the road to help promote the picture, with the girls performing it on stage.

Meanwhile, Hecht put on a new play for the "Symphonies Under the Stars", a week-long festival beginning on July 25. Skyscrapers opened on Saturday July 29 at the Hollywood Bowl to a cast of over one hundred dancers. Hecht directed the play and choreographed the dances to music originally composed by John Alden Carpenter. Hecht refashioned the work into an eight-scene ballet with the help of Blanding Sloane, who worked on the sets, lights and made the masks, and Kay Otteson who designed the costumes. Richard Lert, husband of Vicki Baum, conducted the orchestra.

=== Freelancing at Warner Brothers, Fox and Universal ===
In October 1933, Hecht was offered opportunities to direct dance numbers at Warner Brothers, Universal Pictures, Fox Films and Columbia Pictures within a short period of time. Hecht first went to Warner Bros. to choreograph a Vitaphone Technicolor two-reeler short, produced by Gordon Hollingshead. Morocco Nights was directed by Edward Cline and starred Fuzzy Knight, Shirley Ross and future Hecht client Francis McDonald. Morocco Nights was initially to be included in Warner's Broadway Brevities but was never added.

Scheduled to make an undisclosed Columbia film in 1934 (it has not been established if this plan was fulfilled), Hecht made plans to work at Universal in October 1933 with Stanley Bergerman on I Like It That Way. The film was directed by Harry Lachman and starred Gloria Stuart and Roger Pryor. But shortly before starting production on I Like It That Way in November, Hecht instead opted to go to work on Buddy DeSylva's film Bottoms Up at Fox. The large production was directed by David Butler and starred Spencer Tracy and Pat Paterson with music and lyrics by Gus Kahn. Hecht's numbers in the picture were lauded by critics.

In January 1934, Hecht was approached by Universal again, this time for Glamour a film produced by B. F. Zeidman, directed by William Wyler and starring Constance Cummings and Paul Lukas. In May he was approached by Stanley Bergerman for another Roger Pryor film, Romance in the Rain. This time Hecht provided the dances in the film directed by Stuart Walker.

=== Film directing at M-G-M ===
Hecht is said to have worked on the Edmond Goulding film Hollywood Party (at the time known under the title Star Spangled Banquet) at Metro-Goldwyn-Mayer in March 1934, though no official credit has surfaced to confirm this. In the fall of 1934 Hecht started working on a series of shorts, which he was to direct, under the title Goonies. The shorts were to be based on errors made by college students in filing out official forms, hence making them "goonies". Hecht's new production unit, formed for the purpose of making these shorts in December 1934, was called Goonies Inc. However, the Goonies shorts were never produced, for reasons unknown.

In January 1935, Hecht and his friend Josef Berne were given the go ahead to direct their own Technicolor (using the three-strip process) short at Metro-Goldwyn-Mayer. The color process was still considered a novelty at the time, making this deal, for a new director, quite a generous one. Gypsy Night (known under the working title Song of the Gypsies) was produced by Harry Rapf from a story by Richard Goldstone. The short was filmed throughout March and April. Through cinematography and lighting Hecht and Berne "emphasized on particular colors which most effectively carried out the moods of the music in each scene", a concept that Disney somewhat recreated half a decade later in Fantasia.

The short was based on a romantic perspective of the Russian Gypsies' lives, with dance numbers by Hecht and music by Burton Lane and Harold Adamson. The cast featured Mary Jo Mathews, Perry Askam, Joseph Mario and Ilia Khmara. Gypsy Night opened on Friday, May 24, 1935, at the Capitol Theater in New York City. It was considered avant-garde by some but received generally praising reviews towards its artistic aspect.

Hecht later claimed that his initial departure from Hollywood was caused by a lack of work in the fast-paced, constantly evolving musical pictures business. His style of dances were refreshing when he arrived in 1931. But by 1935 they had been adapted and used by other choreographers and had been well-used at all the major studios.

== Return to New York and Broadway plays ==
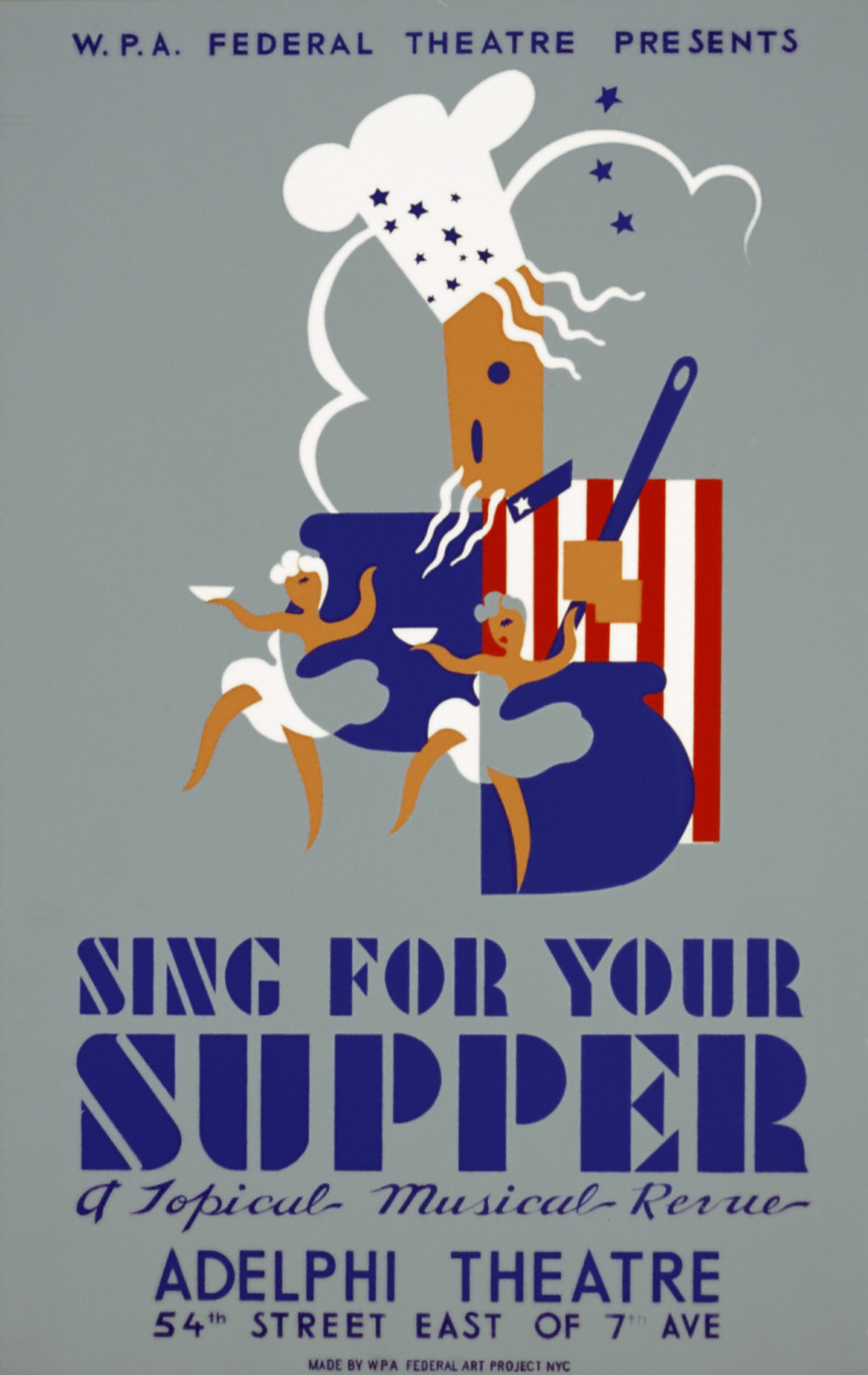
An early Harold Hecht production of Sing for Your Supper at the Adelphi Theatre, 1939. Designed by Aida McKenzie.

In November 1935, exactly four years after leaving, Hecht returned to New York City and took employment at the Summer Hotel. He was then hired by the Theatre Guild and positioned as assistant director and assistant stage manager for the Leonard Lawrence Atlas play But for the Grace of God in 1936. The play was produced by Sidney Harmon and directed by Benno Schneider. Hecht was not the original stage manager of the play and only came in through Schneider's insistence. But for the Grace of God opened on January 12, 1937, and ran for forty-two performances.

It was during this time that Hecht became a member of the Communist Party, subscribing to the Daily Worker and attending select meetings at the New York City Communist Party headquarters on 4th Avenue and the Workers Alliance of America. He also studied five hours a week, taking classes like labor studies, political economy, current events and the rise of Marxism and Leninism. Even though he had a general interest in the party, he was apparently never a devoted Communist and did not seek higher placement or positions.

In 1937 he became employed at the Federal Theatre Project and was put in charge of producing the musical revue Sing for Your Supper. It took Hecht two years to get the play together, compiling songs, lyrics, sketches, seeking out writers and hiring the cast, designing costumes, choreographing dances and other aspects of the production. Sing for Your Supper featured an elaborate cast of different ethnicity, nationalities, religious and political beliefs and Hecht showed no discrimination when hiring actors or crew members. During one of the rehearsals, on May 30, 1938, one of the African American cast members approached one of the leading ladies of the play, Viennese actress Sally Saunders, for a date. The actress was so insulted that she rushed to Hecht, asking for the man to be fired. Hecht gloriously championed the rights of blacks by responding to her "Sally, I'm surprised at you. He has just as much right to life, liberty and pursuit of happiness as you and I have". Saunders was horrified by Hecht's approval of racial equality and in August of that same year testified against him, the Federal Theater, the Workers Alliance of America and entire production of Sing for Your Supper at an anti-communist hearing in Washington, D.C. Sing for Your Supper eventually opened on either March 15 or April 24 (the date is debated) 1939 at the Adelphi Theatre. It was reasonably successful, running forty-four performances and closing on June 30. Feeling that his employment at the Federal Theatre would not be renewed after the play, Hecht left New York in either July or August 1939.

== Second trip to Hollywood ==
=== New career as literary agent ===
In either July or August 1939 Hecht returned to Hollywood and found it difficult to secure employment. He was then living with writer Roland Kibbee and the two became good friends. Kibbee later collaborated with Hecht and Lancaster as a writer for their production companies, and became an equal partner of Lancaster's post-Hecht-Hill-Lancaster Productions venture, Norlan Productions. In late 1939, after months of unemployment, Hecht was hired by Nat Goldstone as a talent agent for the Goldstone Agency. The Goldstone Agency initially dealt with actors and Hecht established for them a literary department, first becoming head of the new division and then being promoted to a partner in the company. He worked two years for the Goldstone Agency, eventually handling up to thirty-six writers. Hecht hired one of these writers, George Willner, to be his assistant. Willner later formed his own literary agency.

=== World War II service ===
Hecht enlisted in the United States Army Air Corps on August 29, 1942, in support of World War II. His army serial number was 19126700. He was promoted to the rank of staff sergeant and placed in Special Services, the entertainment department. He produced live shows for servicemen with in person appearances by some of the biggest stars of the day: including songwriter Johnny Mercer, vocalist Francis Langford, Bing Crosby, Bob Hope and personal friend, actor John Garfield. Hecht was honorably discharged on September 3, 1945.

=== Formation of the Hecht-Rantz Agency ===
After his service in World War II, Hecht returned to Hollywood with plans to head his own talent agency. In the fall of 1945 he formed the Hecht-Rantz Agency with friend and former Goldstone Agency employee, Louis Rantz. Rantz had also worked in Hollywood during the mid-1930s, as an associate producer, mostly with Metropolitan Pictures, George A. Hirliman Productions and B.F. Zeidman Productions. Hecht and Rantz set up their office at 324 South Beverly Drive, Beverly Hills, California.

During a show-going holiday in New York City in late November 1945, Lillian Schary, Dore Schary's sister, suggested to Hecht that he go see a new Broadway play at the Lyceum Theater. A Sound of Hunting, which had opened off-Broadway a couple of weeks earlier, was showcasing a brand new actor, Burt Lancaster. Hecht was immediately impressed with Lancaster's performance. He later said of that night "When I saw Burt Lancaster in A Sound of Hunting on Broadway (in 1945), I knew he had it. I don't know how you could miss it. He was so dominating, so much larger than life". Hecht attended the play many more times before it closed after twenty-three performances on December 8. When nearly all the major Hollywood studios starting coming at Lancaster with offers, his friend and co-star in the play, Sam Levene, an established stage and film actor, offered to represent him. Together they were invited to restaurants, hearing offers from David O. Selznick, 20th Century-Fox and Hal B. Wallis, who had a deal at Paramount Pictures.

Stories are told about the time Hecht was introduced to Lancaster on the last night of the play. The actor said he'd been courted by the big agencies. Hecht told him, "If you sign with a big agency, you'll be assigned to a junior agent who gets a salary, and has two dozen unknowns to find work for." Hecht opted for honesty. "I know everybody, but I have only a few clients. If you signed with me, you'd be at the top of my list and I have to eat so I'd have to keep you working". Lancaster signed with Hecht and they went out to celebrate at a restaurant. There Hecht said, "You know, I really don't like being an agent. I want to produce pictures". Lancaster replied that he wanted the same, which led to Hecht's famous retort, "Come with me and in five years maybe we can make it". The actual time was 19 months.

Through Hecht's negotiations, Lancaster signed a seven-year contract, the longest term a studio was legally allowed to keep an actor under contract at the time, with Hal B. Wallis' Paramount-financed, independent production company, Hal Wallis Productions. The exclusive contract gave Lancaster an option for one outside, independent picture a year, giving the agent/actor room to produce a yearly film, thought they initially never believed the clause would be used. A few months later, in April 1946, Hecht and Lancaster were sitting in the bar of the Barbizon-Plaza Hotel in New York City, having a last drink before Lancaster was off for the filming of The Killers for Mark Hellinger Productions. Lancaster was worried about the kind of movies he'd be getting in Hollywood when Hecht jokingly told him "Well Burt, if you don't like what you get into out there, we'll just produce our own films. That's the one way you're sure to get what you want!". Throughout the 1940s, every actor, producer and director wanted to start their own production company but few were able to accomplish it due to contractual obligations. The few that did manage to venture into productions of their own, most often did not last long enough to make an impact and rarely made more than a handful of movies.

Rantz and Hecht also managed actresses Edith Barrett, Frances Rafferty and Karen Morley and actors Roman Bohnen and Phil Brown in 1945 and 1946. In 1946 the company dissolved and Rantz formed the Louis Rantz Agency.

== Prosperity in Hollywood ==
=== Harold Hecht Productions ===
In 1946 Hecht formed his own company, Harold Hecht Productions, and set up his new office at 8747 Sunset Boulevard West in Hollywood. The new name reflected what he and Lancaster hoped to accomplish; producing movies. However, Harold Hecht Productions also had an agency division and he retained many of the actors and writers already under contract with the Hecht-Rantz Agency. Hecht also signed new talents such as actors Art Smith and Francis McDonald and writers Walter Bernstein, Roland Kibbee and Meta Rosenberg. During this time Hecht became an officer at Irving Mills' music publishing company, Mills Music Inc., though little is known of his work there. By 1947, Harold Hecht Productions was doing very well as a talent agency and Hecht started hiring staff from other noted Hollywood agencies. In May 1947, E. Henry Lewis left the Goldstone Agency to head Harold Hecht Productions' literary staff.

=== Norma Productions and Halburt Productions ===
In the summer of 1947 Hecht co-founded Norma Productions with Burt Lancaster, who named the company after his second wife, Norma Anderson. They worked out a deal with Universal-International, for whom Lancaster had already done The Killers and Brute Force, both for Mark Hellinger Productions. Hecht and Lancaster's first production was Kiss the Blood Off My Hands, a film noir based on British author Gerald Butler's best-selling novel. The movie starred Lancaster, Joan Fontaine and Robert Newton and was directed by Norman Foster, famous for the Mr. Moto crime series starring Peter Lorre, with a soundtrack by Miklós Rózsa, a noted film noir composer. Kiss the Blood Off My Hands, a co-production through Norma Productions and Harold Hecht Productions, was released in late 1948 to moderate success. Following this, Hecht worked exclusively through Norma Productions for the next ten years.

In early 1949 Norma Productions made a three-picture deal with Warner Brothers Pictures, all to be produced by Hecht and to star Lancaster. The inaugural picture was The Flame and the Arrow, a Technicolor swashbuckler directed by Jacques Tourneur. The big-budget film featured some of the biggest names from the Warner Brothers lot at the time, including Virginia Mayo (fresh from White Heat) as the leading lady and Max Steiner (famous for Casablanca and Gone with the Wind) who was hired to compose the soundtrack. The Flame and the Arrow was released in the summer of 1950 and became one of the year's top grossers, earning two nominations at the 23rd Academy Awards ceremony in March 1951; one for Best Dramatic or Comedy Score (Max Steiner), another for Best Color Cinematography (Ernest Haller).

Hecht's next production for Warner Brothers was The Crimson Pirate, another Technicolor swashbuckler starring Lancaster and Nick Cravat, a close friend since boyhood, and former acrobat who had worked with Lancaster in the circus (he had also co-starred in The Flame and the Arrow). It was directed by Robert Siodmak, written by Roland Kibbee and featured an early appearance by Christopher Lee. The Crimson Pirate was made entirely in remote locations, with filming in Ischia, an island off the Gulf of Naples, Italy and at Teddington Studios in England. Released in the fall of 1952, it also went on to be a top-grosser for Warner Brothers. Years later Hecht attempted to develop a sequel, Jolly Roger: Son of the Crimson Pirate, but this film was never made.

Before completing their contract at Warner Brothers, Hecht and Lancaster signed a two-picture deal with Columbia Pictures through the Norma Productions subsidiary, Halburt Productions. The two moderate-budget Columbia films were shot back-to-back at Columbia Studios and marked the beginning of a professional relationship between Hecht, Lancaster and Robert Aldrich, who was Hecht's assistant producer at the studio. Halburt Productions' first film, Ten Tall Men (released in late 1951) was another Technicolor adventure flick about the French Foreign Legion during the Rif War in Morocco. It was written and directed by Willis Goldbeck, co-written by Roland Kibbee and starred Lancaster, Jody Lawrance and Gilbert Roland. It also featured memorable parts by character actors George Tobias, Nick Dennis, Mike Mazurki and Robert Clary. But the real turning point was when Columbia allowed Hecht and Lancaster to produce their first film without Lancaster acting in it. The First Time (released in early 1952) was a comedy film directed by Frank Tashlin starring Robert Cummings and Barbara Hale, based on a short story by Hugo Butler and Jean Rouverol as first-time parents.

Hecht's final Warner Brothers commitment was His Majesty O'Keefe, filmed in mid-1952 but only released in early 1954. His Majesty O'Keefe was granted another large budget for remote location shooting in Technicolor. This time the crew headed to Viti Levu in the Republic of Fiji, where production costs skyrocketed. The film was directed by Byron Haskin and starred Lancaster, Joan Rice and André Morell. It was scored by Dimitri Tiomkin and was the first time that Hecht and Lancaster collaborated with writer James Hill who later became a partner in the company. In December 1952 Hecht joined the Academy of Motion Pictures Arts and Sciences.

=== House Un-American Activities Committee testimony ===
Harold Hecht's name was given to the House Un-American Activities Committee by Martin Berkeley on September 19, 1951. At the time that Hecht's name was brought up, he was in Italy working on Norma Productions' The Crimson Pirate for Warner Brothers and a subpoena for his testimony was only procured two years later. On March 23, 1953, Hecht appeared in front of the House Un-American Activities Committee, represented by his lawyer Edward Bennett Williams. Many of the writers, actors and directors that Hecht and Lancaster had worked with through Norma Productions and Halburt Productions had been named as known or suspected Communists and the Committee was eager to hear Hecht's side of the story. Hecht cooperated with the Committee on every aspect, feeling no shame about his past and answering all their questions regarding his affiliation with the Communist Party. Hecht admitted to once being a member of the Communist Party but informed the Committee that he was no longer of that state of mind. Because of his cooperation with the Committee and his testimony of known Communists from his past, Hecht was not blacklisted and was allowed to resume his position as a successful producer in Hollywood.

=== Hecht-Lancaster Productions ===
In the summer of 1953 Hecht co-founded another Norma Productions subsidiary, Hecht-Lancaster Productions, with Burt Lancaster and signed a two-picture deal with United Artists (the deal would be renegotiated and extended several times over the next few years). Their first production for UA was Apache (released in the summer of 1954), a western told from the perspective of a Native American Apache. It starred Lancaster and Jean Peters with a feature role by John McIntire and an early appearance by Charles Bronson (credited under his real name, Charles Buchinsky). Robert Aldrich was hired as director and James R. Webb wrote the script from an original novel by Paul Wellman. Apache was another box office success for the company and despite the controversy that both leading actors had striking blue eyes, the film met with the approval of Native Americans, who were consulted at private screenings prior to the opening dates.

Apache was followed by Vera Cruz, another western, based on the Mexican Revolution. This was another top-budget Technicolor picture and one of the earliest films to use the widescreen format, using the SuperScope process. Hecht's production company traveled to Mexico and filmed entirely on location, including scenes at the famous Chapultepec Castle. Robert Aldrich and James R. Webb returned as director and writer with Roland Kibbee coming in to help with the script. It starred Lancaster and Gary Cooper with featured roles by Denise Darcel, Sara Montiel, Cesar Romero, George Macready, Ernest Borgnine, Charles Bronson (again credited as Charles Buchinsky), Jack Elam and Jack Lambert. Vera Cruz became Norma Productions' top grosser and one of UA's best box office success, earning over $11 million and boosting Hecht and Lancaster to the top as Hollywood's most prominent independent producers, a position they would keep for five years. Vera Cruz was later considered as one of the potential TV shows that Hecht-Lancaster Productions was to produce and they hired a young western TV writer, Sam Peckinpah, to write a teleplay. But the pilot was never produced.

After Vera Cruz, Hecht-Lancaster Productions delivered three more successful box office films financed by UA. One of the best remembered films of the 1950s, Marty was originally a television episode on The Philco Television Playhouse. The teleplay was written by Paddy Chayefsky and directed by Delbert Mann. Hecht hired both of them to develop the story into a movie and approached Ernest Borgnine, who had never been given a starring role in a film, to play the lead. Gene Kelly's wife, Betsy Blair, won the role of the love interest, bringing her out of the HUAC blacklist. Marty was produced as a low-budget film, shot mostly on location in New York City, with a bank roll of a little over $250,000 (with an additional $100,000 for advertising and publicity).

When the film was released in the spring of 1955, and was paired with a major promotional plan, it became another top-grosser. The film won numerous awards including the Academy Award for Best Picture (Harold Hecht), the Academy Award for Best Director (Delbert Mann), the Academy Award for Best Actor in a Leading Role (Ernest Borgnine), the Academy Award for Best Writing, Adapted Screenplay (Paddy Chayefsky), the Golden Globe Award for Best Actor – Motion Picture Drama, the BAFTA Award for Best Foreign Actor, the BAFTA Award for Best Foreign Actress, the Bodil Award for Best American Film, the Palme d'Or award at the Cannes Film Festival (the first film to technically win the Palme d'Or, as the top prize had recently changed title, and also the first film to win by unanimous votes), the Cannes Film Festival OCIC Award, the Directors Guild of America Award for Outstanding Directorial Achievement in Motion Pictures, the National Board of Review Award for Best Film, the National Board of Review Award for Best Actor, the National Board of Review Award for Top Ten Films, the New York Film Critics Circle Award for Best Film, the New York Film Critics Circle Award for Best Actor, the Writers Guild of America Award for Best Written American Drama. It was also nominated for the Academy Award for Best Actor in a Supporting Role, the Academy Award for Best Actress in a Supporting Role, the Academy Award for Best Cinematography, Black-and-White, the Academy Award for Best Art Direction-Set Decoration, Black-and-White and the BAFTA Award for Best Film from any Source.

Hecht's Best Picture Oscar statue was presented to him by Audrey Hepburn. His acceptance speech is among the most memorable and most quoted; "It's very fortunate to live in a country where any man, no matter how humble his origins, can become a president, and to be part of an industry where any picture, no matter how low its budget, can win an Oscar. All of us who worked on Marty are especially fortunate for this great honor, for to us, from the very beginning, it was a labor of love. Thank you". In November 1959 Marty was the first American film to be screened in the USSR following World War II. It was personally selected by Russian politicians as part of a Soviet-American cultural exchange program, and Hecht was asked by President Eisenhower to travel to Russia for the screening of the film. In 1994 Marty was selected by the National Film Preservation Board for preservation in the Library of Congress' National Film Registry. Marty was also one of the many films considered by Hecht-Lancaster Productions to be made into a television show. An original pilot was made with Shecky Greene in the late 1950s and later (unrelated to Hecht-Hill-Lancaster Productions) with Tom Bosley. Neither were sold to the networks.

Hecht-Lancaster Productions' second film to be released in 1955 was The Kentuckian, another large-budget adventure film shot in Technicolor using the CinemaScope widescreen technology on location in the Kentucky mountains. the screenplay was written by Pulitzer Prize-winning author A. B. Guthrie Jr. from Felix Holt's novel The Gabriel Horn and was Burt Lancaster's official directorial debut. Guthrie had already famously adapted Shane in 1952 and his novel, The Big Sky, was made into a successful Western by Howard Hawks that same year. Hecht and Lancaster hired famed composer Bernard Herrmann for the soundtrack, already renowned at the time for his work with Orson Welles. Herrmann is now best remembered as a close collaborator of Alfred Hitchcock, composing the soundtracks to Psycho, Vertigo and North By Northwest. In addition to starring Lancaster, The Kentuckian featured Dianne Foster, Diana Lynn, John McIntire and was the film debut of Walter Matthau, who played the heavy. As part of its publicity, Hecht hired artist Thomas Hart Benton to paint a life-sized portrait of Lancaster and Donald MacDonald (in character), posing with their dog Faro. The painting, also known as The Kentuckian, has been exhibited at a number of museums over the years and is currently part of Los Angeles County Museum of Art's permanent collection. The film competed at the Venice Film Festival for its top prize, the Golden Lion Award.

The last film released under the Hecht-Lancaster Productions banner (prior to changing the company's name) was the massively budgeted circus film Trapeze. Also filmed in Technicolor with CinemaScope lenses, the film starred Lancaster, Tony Curtis and Italian sex symbol Gina Lollobrigida. The script went through a number of writers including James Jones (From Here to Eternity), Ernest Lehman, Ben Hecht, James R. Webb, Wolf Mankowitz and Liam O'Brien. Trapeze was shot in Paris, France with locations such as the indoor arena Cirque d'Hiver, with recently knighted director Sir Carol Reed. The film is noted for having the largest promotional allowance of the times, with a reported $2 million for publicity. It paid off and was the third best box office earner of the year. Many of its premieres featured local circus performers who were hired to parade through the streets. Though it failed to make an impact at the Academy Awards, it won several awards including the Bambi Award for Best Actress – International, the Berlin International Film Festival Silver Berlin Bear Award for Best Actor, the Berlin International Film Festival Bronze Berlin Bear Award for Audience Poll and a nomination for the Directors Guild of America Award for Outstanding Directorial Achievement in Motion Pictures.

On June 12, 1956, Hecht joined the Screen Producers Guild as their 150th member. That year he also returned to Broadway to bring English playwright Terence Rattigan's hit show Separate Tables to the American stage, with plans to turn it into a film for Hecht-Lancaster Productions. The Broadway production opened on October 25, 1956, and was highly successful, running for 332 performances at the Music Box Theatre and closing on September 28, 1957. The play was directed by Peter Glenville and starred Margaret Leighton, Eric Portman, Donald Harron, Beryl Measor, Phyllis Neilson-Terry, Helena Carroll and May Hallatt. It was nominated for seven Tony Awards at the 11th ceremony in April 1957, winning one for Margaret Leighton as Best Actress. The other nominations included Best Play (The Producers Theatre and Hecht-Lancaster Productions), Best Actor (Eric Portman), Best Featured Actor (William Podmore), two for Best Featured Actress (Beryl Measor and Phyllis Neilson-Terry) and Best Direction (Peter Glenville).

=== Hecht-Hill-Lancaster Productions ===
In 1956 Burt Lancaster announced that writer James Hill was made an equal partner in the company. The new name officially came into effect at the beginning of 1957, with Hecht-Lancaster Productions being updated to Hecht-Hill-Lancaster Productions. The first film released under the new name was The Bachelor Party (released in the spring of 1957), another Paddy Chayefsky dramatic teleplay adapted for the screen with hopes to recreate the success of Marty. Delbert Mann was hired again as director with Alex North composing the soundtrack. The film starred E. G. Marshall, Don Murray and Jack Warden with a notable featured part for actress Carolyn Jones who later portrayed Morticia Addams in the television series The Addams Family. Carolyn Jones played the role of a beatnik at a party and made a considerable impact with viewers. The Bachelor Party won a National Board of Review Award and was nominated for the Palme d'Or Award at the Cannes Film Festival, the BAFTA Award for Best Film from any Source and the Academy Award for Best Actress in a Supporting Role (for Carolyn Jones).

One of today's best remembered film from Hecht-Hill-Lancaster Productions is Sweet Smell of Success, released in late 1957. Though it was a flop at the box office when first released, it has since grown to become one of the most iconic films of the 1950s and has been referenced as a major influence for critically acclaimed directors, including Barry Levinson (who made references to it in his films Diner and Rain Man) and Martin Scorsese. The New York City-based (and filmed) drama represented Hecht and Lancaster's return to the film noir genre since their first picture, Kiss the Blood Off My Hands. It starred Lancaster and Tony Curtis (who also co-produced the film through his production company Curtleigh Productions) from a screenplay by Ernest Lehman and Clifford Odets (who was at the time under contract to Hecht-Hill-Lancaster Productions). Director Alexander Mackendrick was hired with top cinematographer James Wong Howe and composer Elmer Bernstein (fresh from working on Otto Preminger's The Man with the Golden Arm) wrote a memorable soundtrack. The film won the Bambi Award for Best International Actor and was nominated at the British Academy Film Awards for the Best Foreign Actor, the Golden Laurel Award for Top Male Dramatic Performance and the Golden Laurel Award for Top Female Supporting Performance. In 1993 it was selected by the National Film Preservation Board for preservation in the Library of Congress' National Film Registry. It also appeared on Roger Ebert's "Great Movies" list and was added to the Online Film & Television Association Hall of Fame. It was also released on DVD and Blu-ray by The Criterion Collection. In 2002 it was made into a Broadway musical by Marvin Hamlisch, Craig Carnelia and John Guare.

In early 1958 Hecht-Hill-Lancaster Productions released Run Silent, Run Deep, a black-and-white submarine war film based on the best-selling novel by highly decorated US Navy officer Edward L. Beach Jr. Directed by Robert Wise, it starred Clark Gable and Burt Lancaster with featured roles by Nick Cravat, Jack Warden and Don Rickles (in the comedian's film debut). Always hiring top personnel, the script was written by John Gay and the music was composed by Franz Waxman. Cinematographer Russell Harlan was nominated for a Golden Laurel Award for his work on the film.

The film version of Separate Tables (released in late 1958) was another major winner at the awards ceremony. The film was adapted for the screen by Terence Rattigan, John Gay and John Michael Hayes and reunited Delbert Mann for a third turn directing for Hecht. Separate Tables featured an all-star cast with David Niven, Rita Hayworth, Deborah Kerr, Burt Lancaster, Wendy Hiller, Gladys Cooper and Rod Taylor (several years before his best-remembered role in The Birds). The film was originally set to be directed by Laurence Olivier, who was to play Lancaster's role, with his wife, Vivien Leigh, in place of Hayworth. This film earned Hecht his second Academy Awards nomination for Best Picture. The film won several awards including the Academy Award for Best Actor in a Leading Role (David Niven), the Academy Award for Best Actress in a Supporting Role (Wendy Hiller, which Hecht accepted in her place as she could not be present), the Golden Globe Award for Best Actor – Motion Picture Drama, the David di Donatello Award for Best Foreign Actress, the Golden Laurel Award for Top Male Dramatic Performance, the National Board of Review Award for Top Ten Films, the New York Film Critics Circle Award for Best Actor and the Sant Jordi Award for Best Foreign Actor. It was also nominated for the Academy Award for Best Actress in a Leading Role, the Academy Award for Best Writing, Screenplay Based on Material from Another Medium, the Academy Award for Best Cinematography, Black-and-White, the Academy Award for Best Music, Scoring of a Dramatic or Comedy Picture, the Golden Globe Award for Best Motion Picture – Drama, the Golden Globe Award for Best Actress – Motion Picture Drama, the Golden Globe Award for Best Supporting Actress, the Golden Globe Award for Best Director, the Golden Laurel Award for Top Female Dramatic Performance, the Golden Laurel Award for Top Female Supporting Performance, the New York Film Critics Circle Award for Best Film, the New York Film Critics Circle Award for Best Screenplay and the Writers Guild of America Award for Best Written American Drama. That year producer James Hill and star Rita Hayworth were married.

Two limited-budget productions followed Separate Tables: The Rabbit Trap and Cry Tough, both released in 1959. The Rabbit Trap was anticipated as another box office winner, as with Marty, based on a teleplay by JP Miller who adapted his story for the film. British film director Philip Leacock was brought over for the Ernest Borgnine starrer, with Don Rickles in a featured role. But the film only made an impact at the Locarno International Film Festival where Borgnine won the award for Best Actor. Cry Tough was initially set to be a big-budget picture starring Tony Curtis (also to be co-produced by his independent production company), but it eventually starred John Saxon instead. Television director Paul Stanley made his film directorial debut and the movie was topped by one of the first "Jazz Samba" soundtracks, composed by guitarist Laurindo Almeida.

One of Hecht's most coveted film rights purchases came when he procured The Devil's Disciple from Nobel Prize-winner George Bernard Shaw's estate. Set in Colonial America, the story tells of the American Revolutionary War. Initially planned for a 1956 production, the film was to star Lancaster, Montgomery Clift and Laurence Olivier, with Olivier also directing. But Lancaster decided he didn't want to be directed by another actor. Plans were delayed and Clift's part was recast with Kirk Douglas and Olivier dropped out from directing. Instead, Alexander Mackendrick was hired as director, but he was later fired shortly after filming began. Mackendrick was replaced by future James Bond director Guy Hamilton. The film was partly shot at the famous Ealing Studios in England, from a script by Roland Kibbee and John Dighton. It also earned a BAFTA Award nomination for Best British Actor (for Olivier). While The Devil's Disciple was shooting in England, Hecht-Hill-Lancaster Productions was simultaneously producing Summer of the Seventeenth Doll in Australia. The film was based on Ray Lawler's successful dramatic play about sugarcane cutters in Australia, but was greatly re-written and Americanized by screenwriter John Dighton. It was directed by Leslie Norman and starred Ernest Borgnine (his final collaboration with Hecht and Lancaster), Anne Baxter, Angela Lansbury and John Mills. The film was released in Australia in late 1959 but was only released in the United States in late 1961, under the title Season of Passion.

A long-time supporter of racial equality, Hecht then made Take a Giant Step, a coming-of-age drama film dealing with the realities of racism in American schools. Hecht hired pop singer Johnny Nash (later immortalized by his 1972, No.1 hit single I Can See Clearly Now) to play the lead with Philip Leacock directing. Hecht-Hill-Lancaster Productions was hoping to make an impact in the film industry, while African American civil rights leaders like Martin Luther King Jr. were protesting in the streets with the same message. But the film was plagued by delays and resistance from United Artists who initially refused to finance it (it was advanced in full by Hecht-Hill-Lancaster Productions from their other films' profits), then refused to release it, and who finally shelved it after a limited distribution. Still, the film won the Silver Sail Award at the Locarno International Film Festival in Italy and was nominated for the Golden Globe Award for Best Supporting Actress, the Golden Globe Award for Best Film Promoting International Understanding and the BAFTA United Nations Award.

The Unforgiven was the last film shot during Hecht-Hill-Lancaster's status as a working and successful unit and was released in the spring of 1960, by which time the company had dissolved (prior to their limited comeback a year later). The western, filmed using the Panavision Technicolor widescreen lenses on location in Durango, Mexico, dealt with racial intolerance towards Native Americans. The film was filled with star names including director John Huston, former blacklisted writer Ben Maddow (who adapted the screenplay from a novel by Alan Le May), and actors Lancaster, John Saxon, Charles Bickford, Audie Murphy (who replaced Tony Curtis after he dropped out), Albert Salmi and Joseph Wiseman and actresses Audrey Hepburn and Lillian Gish. Production was delayed for months when Hepburn fell off a horse and injured her back.

=== Music industry venture ===
In July 1956, Hecht, his brother-in-law Loring Buzzell (brother of Hecht's first wife Gloria) and Lancaster formed two music publishing firms; Hecht-Lancaster & Buzzell Music (copyrighting exclusively through ASCAP) and Calyork Music (copyrighting exclusively through BMI). The purpose of the new venture (a subsidiary of the Hecht and Lancaster Companies/Norma Productions) was to publish and copyright songs from their films' soundtracks and license them to record labels for release in the booming business of vinyls for the home market. The compositions published through Hecht-Lancaster & Buzzell Music and Calyork Music have been released through Columbia Records, Warner Bros. Records, MGM Records, ABC-Paramount Records, Capitol Records, London Records, United Artists Records, Decca Records, Mercury Records, RCA Victor Records, Jubilee Records, Coral Records, Top Rank Records, Date Records, Kapp Records, Apollo Records, Maine Records and Cabot Records.

Hecht-Lancaster & Buzzell Music and Calyork Music also published songs from non-film related composers, who in turn had their work adapted and recorded by musicians and gained royalties. One notable non-movie hit that Hecht-Lancaster & Buzzell had was the McGuire Sisters's version of May You Always which peaked to No. 11 on the Billboard Hot 100 list in January 1959 and became the second best-selling sheet music in the United States. Some of the notable soundtracks published through Hecht-Lancaster & Buzzell Music and Calyork Music include Trapeze, Sweet Smell of Success, Cry Tough and The Unforgiven. The soundtrack to Sweet Smell of Success was quite notable and critically important as it was the first film to feature two completely different soundtracks released on LP; one with Elmer Bernstein's score, the other with Chico Hamilton's jazz band.

=== Plans after Hecht-Hill-Lancaster Productions ===
When Hecht-Hill-Lancaster Productions announced a hiatus (which eventually led to their breakup) in the spring of 1959, Hecht was approached with two offers. The first was for a major executive position at Paramount Pictures as Production Chief, succeeding Young Frank Freeman. But Hecht had enjoyed the freedom of being an independent film producer for twelve years and was reluctant to deal with a major Hollywood studio's problems. He had also been offered a similar position at Metro-Goldwyn-Mayer two years earlier, which he had not accepted for the same reason. Hecht turned down Paramount's offer and the position was eventually filled by Jack Karp.

The second proposal interested him much more. Producer Alan J. Pakula had purchased the film rights to Elliott Arnold's action novel, Flight from Ashiya, and approached Hecht to co-produce it. Hecht and Lancaster had previously purchased the screen rights to one of Arnold's Western books, Blood Brother, and came very close to turning it into a picture (it was eventually made as Broken Arrow with James Stewart). Pakula commissioned Arnold to adapt Flight from Ashiya into a screenplay while Hecht approached such stars as Clark Gable, Ronald Reagan and Tuesday Weld for the leads. But that summer Hecht became involved with other film projects that soon took on priority and it would be four years before Flight from Ashiya was filmed, with a different script and an all-new cast including Yul Brynner.

On top of promoting a backlog of Hecht-Hill-Lancaster Productions films that were coming out in 1959–1960 (The Rabbit Trap, Cry Tough, Summer of the Seventeenth Doll, The Devil's Disciple, Take a Giant Step and The Unforgiven), Hecht was busy planning future United Artists-financed films from the H-H-L unit (including The Way West). He also formed a new film production company with Canadian actor Glenn Ford. Their first film together was to be Evan Hunter's novel, A Matter of Conviction, concerning members of a Harlem street gang tried for murder (later released as The Young Savages). Glenn Ford had already starred in another Hunter adaptation, Blackboard Jungle; the film was nominated for four Oscars. Hecht was hoping that the new combo would be as successful and hired more top Hollywood personnel to work on The Young Savages; John Gay to write the screenplay and Robert Rossen to direct. But by the end of the year, Glenn Ford had left the project and in early 1960 Rossen dropped out to focus on his future Oscar-nominated film, The Hustler.

Many of the projects that Hecht worked on between 1959 and 1964 shifted back and forth between independent solo productions and Hecht-Hill-Lancaster Productions ventures. Because of a financial deficit owed to United Artists when Hecht-Hill-Lancaster Productions decided to call it quits in 1959, the three partners were obligated to make a number of films for the studio in an attempt to recoup the costs. Some of the films were to be as individuals, others were required to be under the Hecht-Hill-Lancaster Productions banner. In that manner, The Young Savages became a Hecht-Hill-Lancaster Productions film when Burt Lancaster was cast in the lead, replacing Glenn Ford, in early 1960.

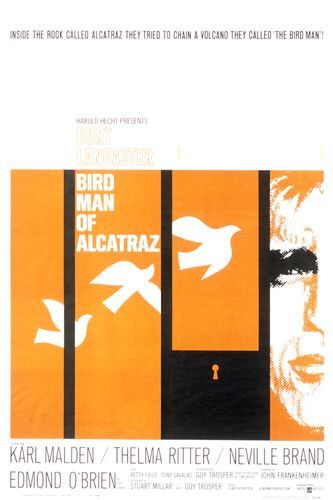
Birdman of Alcatraz film poster. Norma Productions, 1962

With Lancaster in the picture, The Young Savages headed in a new direction. Hecht hired J.P. Miller, who had worked on The Rabbit Trap and had since been nominated for an Emmy Award, and Edward Anhalt, a two-time Academy Award nominee who had won a Best Screenplay Oscar for the 1951 film Panic in the Streets, to rewrite the script. Meanwhile, Lancaster approached respected young television director John Frankenheimer who had already done a low-budget picture, The Young Stranger, a few years prior but The Young Savages has since been considered by most as his true film debut. Lancaster and Frankenheimer would make a total of five films together. In turn, Frankenheimer hired another television acquaintance, the promising young actor Sydney Pollack, as a dialogue coach for the teenage hoodlums who needed an authentic New York City accents. The Young Savages was partly filmed on location in New York City with three-time Academy Award nominated cinematographer Lionel Lindon. Lindon had won an Oscar in 1957 for his work on Around the World in Eighty Days. The cast featured Shelley Winters, who had just won an Oscar for The Diary of Anne Frank, Edward Andrews, who had just made Elmer Gantry with Lancaster and Dina Merrill, who had just finished Blake Edwards' Operation Petticoat with Cary Grant and Tony Curtis. Telly Savalas made his film debut playing the role of a tough cop, not unlike his future TV character in Kojak. The Young Savages was released in the spring of 1961 through United Artists, but unfortunately was not the success that Hecht had anticipated.

Immediately after filming wrapped on The Young Savages, Hecht and Lancaster started filming their next project. Birdman of Alcatraz was once again financed by United Artists, as part of the recoup deal. The biopic was a romanticized depiction of Robert Stroud, a life-sentenced murderer who taught himself ornithology while confined in prison, and who became an authority on bird medicine. Stroud authored a series of books on the subject and gained enough recognition that a biography of his life was accounted by Thomas E. Gaddis. Gaddis' novel was first optioned by Twentieth Century-Fox in the late 1950s but the project was strongly opposed by the prison system which did not want to dignify the public's perception of the criminal. In 1960 Hecht and Lancaster purchased the film rights and hired Guy Trosper, an Academy Award nominee, to write the screenplay. Filming began on location in San Francisco in the summer of 1960, with British director Charles Crichton. But due to disagreements with Lancaster, Crichton was fired after a mere week of shooting. Hecht and Lancaster approached Frankenheimer to take over as director. No fewer that four film editors were hired and then fired. The rough cut ran four hours. Finally, when shooting wrapped, Lancaster personally supervised the editing. The result was an acclaimed and Academy-nominated performance for his acting.

Two top cinematographers were hired to work on Birdman of Alcatraz; Burnett Guffey, who had won an Oscar in 1954 for his work on From Here to Eternity and had been nominated in 1957 for The Harder They Fall, and John Alton, who had worked with Lancaster on Elmer Gantry but was most known for the iconic film noir, The Big Combo. With Lancaster in the lead, the rest of the cast featured Karl Malden, a two-time Oscar nominee, once for A Streetcar Named Desire, another for On the Waterfront, Thelma Ritter, a five-time Oscar nominee, Telly Savalas, Neville Brand, Edmond O'Brien, an Oscar winner for The Barefoot Contessa who had appeared in Lancaster's first film, The Killers in 1946, Hugh Marlowe, who had appeared in Elmer Gantry and Whit Bissell, who had appeared in two other Lancaster films, Brute Force and Gunfight at the O.K. Corral as well as in Frankenheimer's The Young Stranger. The film also features an uncredited bit part by Len Lesser, who in the 1990s gained fame as Uncle Leo in Seinfeld. Elmer Bernstein returned to compose the soundtrack, his second collaboration with Hecht after his triumph on Sweet Smell of Success.

Birdman of Alcatraz was another major success at film festivals and award ceremonies. After its release in the summer of 1962, it was nominated for four Oscars including one for Lancaster as Best Actor in a Leading Role, one for Telly Savalas as Best Actor in a Supporting Role, one for Thelma Ritter as Best Actress in a Supporting Role and one for Burnett Guffey for Best Black-and-White Cinematography. It won three Laurel Awards, one for Top Drama, one for Top Male Dramatic Performance and one for Top Female Supporting Performance. The British Academy Film Awards gave Lancaster an award for Best Foreign Actor and the Golden Globe Awards nominated him for Best Actor in a Leading Role and Savalas for Best Supporting Actor. The Directors Guild of America Award nominated Frankenheimer for Outstanding Directorial Achievement in Motion Pictures and the Writers Guild of America Award nominated Trosper for Best Written American Drama. At the Venice Film Festival, it was nominated for its top prize, the Golden Lion, and won the Volpi Cup Award for Best Actor and the San Giorgio Prize Award. It also made the National Board of Review Awards' Top Ten Films list and was ranked number 76 on AFI's list, 100 Years…100 Cheers: America's Most Inspiring Movies.

=== Return to Harold Hecht Productions ===
Hecht's next project was originally planned for Hecht-Hill-Lancaster Productions in the late 1950s, after they bought the property from Robert Aldrich. But in early 1960 it was announced that Hecht was taking over the production of Taras Bulba, an action-adventure film that incorporated elements of war and romance. Based on Nikolai Gogol's novella of the same name, Taras Bulba tells the story of a Cossack clan in Ukraine fighting against the Poles, all while a love story develops between the son of the Cossack leader and the daughter of an aristocratic Polish family. The film was a co-production between Tony Curtis' Curtleigh Productions and Hecht's original Harold Hecht Productions, making a comeback after its first use for 1948's Kiss the Blood Off My Hands. Hecht hired J. Lee Thompson as director and Waldo Salt, who had written the script of The Flame and the Arrow in 1949 before being blacklisted, and Karl Tunberg, a two-time Oscar nominee who had just worked on megahit Ben-Hur, to write the screenplay.

The title role was first planned for Lancaster, then for Anthony Quinn and finally landed on Yul Brynner, an Academy Award winner for his role in The King and I, who would provide an authentic performance with his Gypsy background. It co-starred Tony Curtis and Christine Kaufmann, who went on to marry him after the film. Featured roles were played by Sam Wanamaker, Brad Dexter, who had appeared in Hecht's Run Silent, Run Deep and The Magnificent Seven with Brynner, Guy Rolfe, Perry Lopez and George Macready. Hecht also gave a cameo role to his soon-to-be second wife, Martine Millner, as a gypsy dancer.

The production was financed by United Artists with a budget of $3,800,000. Hecht went on location in Salta, Argentina with Eastmancolor equipped Panavision cameras, and two-time Oscar nominated cinematographer, Joseph MacDonald. After a series of delays, extensive hiring of extras for the battle scenes and post-production costs at Columbia Studios, the films' budget skyrocketed to a total of $7,000,000. Taras Bulba was released in late 1962 and featured a score by Franz Waxman, who had worked with Hecht on Run Silent, Run Deep. Waxman's soundtrack was a considerable success, surpassing the fame of the film itself. It was praised by Bernard Herrmann, considered by many to be one of Hollywood's greatest composers. Waxman's score was nominated for three awards; one at the Academy Awards for Best Music Score – Substantially Original, another at the Golden Globe Awards, for Best Original Score and a last at the International Film Music Critics Association for Best Archival Re-Recording of an Existing Score.

In late 1962 Hecht resumed work on Flight from Ashiya. By then Alan Pakula had dropped out to produce the drama film To Kill a Mockingbird. Waldo Salt continued his association with Hecht and co-wrote the screenplay with author Elliot Arnold. Oscar nominated director Michael Anderson (nominated for Around the World in Eighty Days) came on board with two cinematographers; Burnett Guffey, who had just been nominated at the Academy Awards for his work on Birdman of Alcatraz, and Joseph MacDonald, who had worked on Taras Bulba. The production was financed and distributed by United Artists on a much smaller budget of $1,800,000, but was still granted top-quality equipment of the era, including Panavision and Eastmancolor.

The story revolved around a United States Air Force Air Rescue Service mission to save Japanese civilians stranded on a lifeboat. This time the crew traveled to Rome, Italy, where Hecht and his new bride Martine Millner were to have a limited honeymoon squeezed between the shooting schedule. Most of the filming subsequently took place in Japan, in Kyoto, Tokyo, Tachikawa and Osaka. The film starred Yul Brynner, Richard Widmark and George Chakiris, who was reluctant to take the role after winning an Oscar for Best Supporting Actor in West Side Story. It also featured Suzy Parker, Shirley Knight, who had been nominated for Best Supporting Actress the year prior for The Dark at the Top of the Stairs, Danielle Gaubert and Eiko Taki, whom Hecht signed to a non-exclusive, three-picture contract with Harold Hecht Productions (the other two films on her contract were never made). Flight from Ashiya was released in the spring of 1964 to limited success.

Tony Curtis had been under contract to Universal Pictures since 1948 and his last film for the studio was up. Hecht teamed up with Curtis' new production company, Reynard Productions, to produce the romantic comedy, Wild and Wonderful (previously, Monsieur Cognac). Financed through a strictly budgeted, one-picture deal with Universal, Wild and Wonderful was Hecht's fourth and final collaboration with Curtis. It also starred Curtis' new wife, Christine Kaufmann, who signed a six-picture contract with Harold Hecht Productions; the other five films of her deal never materialized. Featured roles were played by Larry Storch, Marty Ingels, Marcel Dalio, Cliff Osmond, Fifi D'Orsay, Vito Scotti, Stanley Adams and Shelly Manne. Wild and Wonderful was based on Dorothy Crider's story, I Married a Dog. The comedic plot involves an alcoholic dog, named Monsieur Cognac, who one night escapes from his mansion in Paris to get a drink. He befriends a young musician (Curtis) and spends the night with him at locals taverns before sleeping it off at his apartment. Monsieur Cognac's owner, a rich and famous actress (Kaufmann), finds the two of them the next day and develops a love affair with Curtis, much to the opposition of her jealous dog and her controlling father.

A number of screenwriters worked on Wild and Wonderful, including Philip Rapp, Richard Powell, Larry Markes, Michael Morris and Waldo Salt. Director Michael Anderson returned to work with Hecht for a second time after Flight from Ashiya, with seven-time Academy Award nominated cinematographer, Joseph LaShelle, who had won an Oscar for Laura in 1945. The film was entirely set in Paris but because of Universal's limited budget, it became one of the few movies that Hecht was not granted permission to film on actual location. It was shot at Universal Studios with sets superbly designed by Ruby R. Levitt, an Oscar-nominated set decorator who had previously worked with Hecht on Kiss the Blood Off My Hands (also filmed at Universal Studios, in 1948). Wild and Wonderful was released in the spring of 1964 but was a box-office disappointment.

In late 1962 Hecht signed a two-picture deal with Columbia Pictures. After a series of projects fell through, Hecht decided to revive an old Hecht-Lancaster Productions property from the mid-1950s, Roy Chanselor's Western novel, The Ballad of Cat Ballou. As a Hecht-Lancaster Productions project, Cat Ballou was originally to be a comedy musical Western film starring Burt Lancaster and Tony Curtis as rival brothers. As early as 1960, Hecht worked on Cat Ballou as a solo project and was finally able to secure its production through his Columbia deal.

The plot for Cat Ballou evolves around a young woman coming back to her homestead only to find her father's farm terrorized by local gunmen. She hires the legendary Kid Shelleen to defend the farm but soon realizes that he's a washout, more interested in getting drunk. The film went through a series of screenwriters from its inception in 1956, starting with Roy Chanselor who adapted his own novel, then William Bowers, William Ludwig, Burt Kennedy, Walter Newman, Mitchell Lindemann, Frank Pierson, and finally Walter Bernstein, who agreed to write the script "to Hecht's satisfaction". That no time limit clause in his contract caused him to work for two years until Hecht said, okay, that's it. Bernstein said he would never agree to such a contract clause again.

The principal role of Kid Shelleen was offered and passed on by almost every big name star in Hollywood over its ten-year pre-production stage. After Lancaster dropped out, five other actors turned down the role, including Spencer Tracy, Kirk Douglas and José Ferrer, before Lee Marvin was offered the part. The role of Cat Ballou was also offered to a number of stars, including Natalie Wood (when Lancaster was still in the cast) and Ann-Margret (who didn't get a chance to accept it as her agent turned it down without consulting her), before Jane Fonda accepted it. The rest of the cast featured Michael Callan, Dwayne Hickman, Nat King Cole, Stubby Kaye, Tom Nardini, Jay C. Flippen, John Marley, Arthur Hunnicutt, Reginald Denny and Bruce Cabot. Cat Ballou turned out to be Nat King Cole's final film appearance as he died of lung cancer four months before it was released. The film was directed by Elliot Silverstein, who had spent the previous ten years directing television episodes, and was shot in twenty-eight days on location in Cañon City, Colorado, at the Columbia Ranch in Burbank, California and at the Gower Street Studios in Hollywood. Two-time Oscar nominee Frank De Vol composed the soundtrack with songs written by Mack David and Jerry Livingston.

Released in the summer of 1965, Cat Ballou was a huge success and earned over $20,000,000 at the box-office. It was one of the top-ten films of the year and was nominated and won a ton of awards. At the 38th Academy Awards ceremony in 1966 it was nominated for five Oscars including one for Lee Marvin who won for Best Actor in a Leading Role. Other nominated categories included Best Writing, Screenplay Based on Material from Another Medium, Best Editing, Best Music, Original Song and Best Music, Scoring of Music, Adaptation or Treatment. At the Golden Globe Awards, Marvin won for Best Actor – Motion Picture Musical or Comedy and the film was nominated for Best Motion Picture – Musical or Comedy, Best Actress – Motion Picture Musical or Comedy, Most Promising Newcomer – Male and for Best Original Song. The British Academy Film Awards too rewarded Marvin for Best Foreign Actor and nominated Nardini for Most Promising Newcomer to Leading Film Roles. The Laurel Awards was another big supporter of the film, with four Golden Laurels; one for Best Comedy, one for Top Male Comedy Performance, one for Top Female Comedy Performance and another for Top Song. The Directors Guild of America nominated Silverstein for Outstanding Directorial Achievement in Motion Pictures and the Writers Guild of America nominated Newman and Pierson for Best Written American Comedy. The New York Film Critics Circle gave Marvin an award for Best Actor. The Berlin International Film Festival Awarded the film in three categories; the Silver Berlin Bear Award for Best Actor, the Award of Special Mention and the Award for Best Feature Film Suitable for Young People and nominated Silverstein for a Golden Berlin Bear Award for Best Director.

Before Cat Ballou was even released, Hecht announced to the press an interest in producing a sequel entitled Kid Shelleen. He hoped to have Marvin and Fonda reprise their roles and was in negotiation with Bette Davis for a part. Hecht worked on various scripts and pre-production stages over the next twenty years of his life. Cat Ballou was also adapted for two separate television pilots, both in 1971. The first was for ABC and starred Lesley Ann Warren as Cat Ballou, Jack Elam as Kid Shelleen and Tom Nardini who returned as Jackson Two Bears. The ABC episode aired on September 5, 1971. The second pilot was produced at the same time by NBC and starred Jo Ann Harris as Cat Ballou, Forrest Tucker as Kid Shelleen and featured Harry Morgan as a rancher. This episode aired on September 6, 1971, the day after the ABC episode was shown. Neither pilots were picked up for production.

Hecht's final released film was adapted from A. B. Guthrie Jr.'s Pulitzer Prize-winning Western novel, The Way West. The production of The Way West marked the end of Hecht's contract with United Artists, which had already spent quite a considerable amount of money on pre-production at that point. The property had originally been purchased by Hecht-Lancaster Productions in late 1953 and Hecht spent fourteen years developing the screenplay under the financial supervision of United Artists. When announced in 1953, United Artists had granted the production unit the largest budget a Western film had ever received, with $5,000,000, advertising costs excluded. By 1959 that budget had been raised to $8,000,000.

The Way West was intended as a major box-office attraction and Hecht hired Hollywood's top names to work on the film. Over the years such stars as Burt Lancaster, Gary Cooper, James Stewart, John Wayne, Charlton Heston, Ingrid Bergman and Katharine Hepburn were all signed on for parts. A number of writers also worked on various developments, including Clifford Odets, John Twist, Marvin Borowsky, James R. Webb and Jessamyn West. The final screenplay was written by Mitchell Lindemann and Ben Maddow and the production starred Kirk Douglas, Richard Widmark and Robert Mitchum. Jack Elam, Nick Cravat, John Mitchum (Robert Mitchum's younger brother, best remembered for appearing in Clint Eastwood's Dirty Harry series), Stubby Kaye and Sally Field (making her film debut) all had featured roles.

Filmed on location in Oregon and Arizona using Panavision cameras equipped with DeLuxe color film, The Way West retold the story of pioneers who crossed the Midwest to reach the new territory of Oregon in the mid-1840s. The film was directed by Andrew V. McLaglen, an established and well-respect Western director who had done McLintock! with John Wayne, Shenandoah and The Rare Breed, both with James Stewart, The Ballad of Josie with Doris Day and Peter Graves, and Gun the Man Down with James Arness. He had also directed a number of Western television episodes on Have Gun – Will Travel with Richard Boone, Gunsmoke with James Arness, Rawhide with Clint Eastwood and Gunslinger with Tony Young. The cinematographer on The Way West was equally qualified. William H. Clothier was a two-time Oscar nominee for Westerns. He had worked on Stagecoach, The Rare Breed, Shenandoah, Cheyenne Autumn, McLintock!, The Man Who Shot Liberty Valance, The Comancheros, The Alamo, The Horse Soldiers, Gun the Man Down and Seven Men from Now. The movie was topped by Bronislau Kaper's soundtrack, a three-time Academy Award nominated composer. But even with all the star-power that Hecht had employed over the years, the film turned out to be a box-office disappointment.

After The Way West, Hecht continued working on a great many film projects and never retired from his profession. The next film he developed was The Comic, his second of the two-picture contract at Columbia Pictures. Adapted from the original story Baggy Pants by Walter Newman, The Comic was first adapted by the author in late 1965. The story dealt with a silent screen star, his rise to fame and his downfall. In the summer of 1967 Hecht approached Dick Van Dyke to star in the film and Carl Reiner to direct and co-produce it. With them on board The Comic became a joint venture between Harold Hecht Productions, Van Dyke's DFI Productions and Reiner's Acre Enterprises. Later that summer Hecht screen-tested May 1967 Playboy Playmate of the Month model, Anne Randall, for the female lead. Reiner, Van Dyke and screenwriter Aaron Ruben re-wrote the screenplay considerably over the next year and by the summer of 1968, Hecht was out of the picture. The film was eventually released in late 1969, strictly as a Reiner production, and it is currently unknown if any of Hecht's contributions remained in the final version of the film.

One of the projects that has been wrongly accredited to Hecht is Ulzana's Raid. Certain sources claim (without validating their own sources) that Hecht (as well as Burt Lancaster, who starred in the film) was an uncredited producer. Hecht's involvement was never claimed by anyone who worked on the film and the only credited production companies and producers for Ulzana's Raid are Robert Aldrich and his production company, The Associates and Aldrich Company, and Carter DeHaven and his production company, De Haven Productions. There are no records of Hecht having any input on this film, nor of his various production companies being involved. Neither are there any records of Lancaster's company, Norlan Productions, being involved in the making of the film. Though Lancaster was often noted as having a strong influence on the directing and editing of the motion pictures he appeared in, Ulzana's Raid was in fact a financial agreement between Lancaster and Universal Pictures; in exchange for Lancaster appearing in Ulzana's Raid, Universal was to finance the making of Norlan Production's film The Midnight Man. Hecht's collaboration on Ulzana's Raid is therefore a debated issue, and with no proof whatsoever to validate this claim, it is better to assume that he was not associated with the project at all.

== Personal life ==
=== Marriage to Gloria Buzzell ===
Hecht was married twice. His first marriage was to Gloria Joyce Buzzell on November 1, 1947, in Las Vegas, Nevada. Gloria Buzzell's father, Samuel Jesse Buzzell, was a theatrical and music-patent attorney and her uncle was film director Edward Buzzell. She had previously worked as an executive assistant in MGM's story department. Harold and Gloria had three children together; Steven, Duffy and Alma.

Steven Hecht, born 1948 is an attorney living in the Los Angeles area. Duffy W. Hecht, born June 1950 at the Cedars of Lebanon Hospital in Hollywood, is a producer/writer living in Carpinteria, California. Alma Hecht, born September 1955 at the Saint John's Health Center in Santa Monica was a landscape designer living in Berkeley, California. She died of adult polyglucosan body disease in May 2019. Her writings and a final note from her brothers, Steven and Duffy, can be found Alma's blog, Better Branches https://betterbranches.tumblr.com/.

Harold and Gloria separated on July 18, 1959, with Harold moving permanently into Hecht-Hill-Lancaster Productions' luxurious apartment on Wilshire Boulevard in Beverly Hills, which he had been maintaining during the couples previous arguments. On August 25, 1960, Gloria sued Hecht for divorce alleging mental and physical suffering. Other causes stated included frequent arguments and Harold's extended absence from the family home while working on film productions. Gloria demanded over $1,300,000 in community properties and full custody of their three children. The filing for divorce procedure was granted by the Santa Monica, California court on September 7, 1960, and on June 28, 1961, the divorce was finalized. Harold's estimated $2–4 million value went under appraisal while the ruling over custody of their three children was postponed for an additional 60 days. Part of the estate included original Vincent van Gogh drawing The Plain of La Crau, purchased in 1955. Additional court sessions were held in July 1961, August 1962, April 1963 and June 1963, where Gloria sued for additional alimony. The court's decision concluded that Harold would pay alimony to Gloria for 121 months (a little over 10 years) regardless of occupation or remarriages. If Harold was to pass away before the end of the ten years, his estate was to continue payments. On July 12, 1963, Gloria remarried to Franklin Desser, an attorney from New York City, and became Gloria Hecht Desser. In January 1968, Harold filed for appeal over the alimony ruling but was denied.

=== Marriage to Martine Millner ===
Hecht's second marriage was to English model-actress Martine Millner, née Margaret Truefitt. The couple took out a marriage license on Tuesday, October 30, 1962, in Los Angeles and were wed on Thursday, November 1 in San Francisco. They then embarked on a honeymoon in Rome, where part of Hecht's then production, Flight from Ashiya, was being filmed. At the time of their marriage, Millner was 26 while Hecht was 55. Millner had a cameo in Hecht's 1962 film, Taras Bulba. Harold and Martine also had three children together; Harold Jr., Adam and Rebecca.

Harold and Martine separated in September 1974, two months short of celebrating their twelve-year anniversary. This time the court ordered Harold to pay a $4,000 monthly allowance to Martine and she retained possession of the couple's $350,000 home and half of his $2,000,000 community property assets.

Harold Hecht Jr., born September 14, 1963, worked with director John Frankenheimer and is now a three-time Emmy Award-winning sports television producer.

Adam Arthur Hecht was born on August 6, 1965, at the UCLA Medical Center and worked as a tennis coach before mysteriously vanishing on July 7, 1989, from Beverly Hills, California at age 23. He has never been found, but the police do not suspect foul play and classify the case as a missing person. The story of Adam Hecht's disappearance was depicted on the American television series Unsolved Mysteries in 1990.

Rebecca was born in May 1970; her profession is a baking business.

=== Death ===
Hecht died in his home in Beverly Hills, of pancreatic cancer on May 26, 1985. It was six days before his 78th birthday. He was interred in the Westwood Village Memorial Park Cemetery in Los Angeles.

== Partial list of companies ==
Hecht has founded and co-founded a number of companies over the years.

- Goonies (1934–1935)
- Hecht-Rantz Agency (1945–1946) with Louis Rantz
- Harold Hecht Productions (1946–1985)
- Norma Productions (1947–1985) with Burt Lancaster
- Halburt Productions (1950–1952) with Burt Lancaster
- Hecht-Lancaster Productions (1953–1956) with Burt Lancaster
- William Service Company (1953–1959) with Burt Lancaster
- Hecht-Hill-Lancaster Productions (1956–1960) with Burt Lancaster and James Hill
- Hecht-Lancaster & Buzzell Music (1956–1957) with Burt Lancaster and Loring Buzzell
- Calyork Music (1957–1958) with Burt Lancaster and Loring Buzzell
- Clifton Productions (1957–1958) with Burt Lancaster and James Hill
- Hecht & Buzzell Music (1959–1960) with Lu Ann Simms
- Contemporary Productions (1960–1961) with Burt Lancaster
- The Harold Hecht Corporation (1962–1985)
- Harold Hecht Films (1964–1985)
- Harold Hecht Company (1966–1985)

== Partial list of clients and contract actors ==
This section contains a list of people who were managed partly or exclusively by Harold Hecht (through the Goldstone Agency, the Hecht-Rantz Agency or Harold Hecht Productions) and actors who signed long-term or multi-picture contracts with him or his solo production companies. It does not include actors who were under contract to Norma Productions, Hecht-Lancaster Productions or Hecht-Hill-Lancaster Productions.

- Leopold Lawrence Atlas, writer
- Edith Barrett, actress
- Walter Bernstein, writer
- Roman Bohnen, actor
- Phil Brown, actor
- Paddy Chayefsky, writer
- Daniel Fuchs, writer
- Danielle Gaubert, actress
- Christine Kaufmann, actress
- Roland Kibbee, writer
- Burt Lancaster, actor
- Isobel Lennart, writer
- Francis McDonald, actor
- Karen Morley, actress
- Frances Rafferty, actress
- Meta Reis Rosenberg, writer
- Art Smith, actor
- Eiko Taki, actress
- George Willner, writer

== Theater credits ==
=== As actor ===
- The Straw Hat (October–November 1926)
- Big Lake (April 1927)
- Much Ado About Nothing (November–December 1927)
- Dr. Knock (February–March 1928)
- Grand Street Follies (May–October 1928)
- The Wild Duck (November 1928 – January 1929)

=== As dance director/choreographer ===
- Les noces (1930)
- Lucky Day (December 1931 – 1932)
- Hullabaloo (May–June 1932)
- The Merry Widow (November 1932 – 1933)
- Skyscrapers (July 1933)
- Sing for Your Supper (April–June 1939)

=== As director ===
- Hullabaloo (May–June 1932)
- The Merry Widow (November 1932 – 1933)
- Skyscrapers (July 1933)
- But for the Grace of God (January 1937 – 1937)
- Sing for Your Supper (April–June 1939)

=== As producer ===
- Hullabaloo (May–June 1932)
- Skyscrapers (July 1933)
- Sing for Your Supper (April–June 1939)
- Separate Tables (October 1956 – September 1957)
