= The Island of Doctor Moreau (disambiguation) =

The Island of Doctor Moreau is an 1896 science fiction novel written by H. G. Wells.

The Island of Doctor Moreau may also refer to:

- The Island of Dr. Moreau (1977 film), a film adaptation of the novel with Burt Lancaster and Michael York
- The Island of Dr. Moreau (1996 film), a later film adaptation with Marlon Brando and Val Kilmer

== See also ==
- Island of Lost Souls (1932 film), an early film adaptation of the novel using a different title, with Charles Laughton and Béla Lugosi
