= The Crimson Pirate =

1952 film by Robert Siodmak

- Theatrical release poster
- Directed by: Robert Siodmak
- Written by: Roland Kibbee; Waldo Salt (first draft)
- Produced by: Norman Deming; Harold Hecht; Burt Lancaster
- Starring: Burt Lancaster; Nick Cravat; Eva Bartok; Leslie Bradley; Torin Thatcher; James Hayter
- Cinematography: Otto Heller
- Edited by: Jack Harris
- Music by: William Alwyn
- Production company: Norma Productions
- Distributed by: Warner Bros. Pictures
- Release dates: August 27, 1952 (New York); September 26, 1952 (Los Angeles)
- Running time: 105 minutes
- Country: United States
- Language: English
- Budget: $1.75 million

The Crimson Pirate is a 1952 Technicolor swashbuckler comedy-adventure film produced by Norman Deming and Harold Hecht, directed by Robert Siodmak and starring Burt Lancaster, Nick Cravat, Eva Bartok, Leslie Bradley, Torin Thatcher and James Hayter.

The film continued a long collaboration between Lancaster and acrobat Nick Cravat, and Lancaster had previously starred in Siodmak's The Killers (1946). In The Crimson Pirate, Lancaster plays a pirate captain in a marked departure from his previous portrayals of morally upright characers. The film follows a crew of outlaws in a comedic romp at the expense of the royal crown.

== Plot ==
Late in the 18th century, Caribbean pirate Captain Vallo and his crew capture a frigate of the king's navy. The ship is carrying Baron Gruda, the king's special envoy heading to the island of Cobra to crush a rebellion led by a man known as El Libre. Baron Gruda and Vallo strike an agreement: Vallo will release the baron and his crew but keep the frigate. In return, they will capture El Libre and bring him to the baron for a sizable reward.

Vallo and his crew sail to Cobra, where the captain and his lieutenant Ojo meet the island's rebels, led by Pablo Murphy and El Libre's daughter Consuelo. Vallo and Ojo learn that El Libre has been captured and is imprisoned on the island of San Pero. After sailing to San Pero, Vallo impersonates the baron and orders the prisoners released into his custody.

Consuelo is distraught to hear that Vallo intends on selling her, El Libre and the professor to Baron Gruda. Consuelo begs Vallo to accompany them, but he refuses. Vallo's first mate, Humble Bellows, overhears the conversation and turns against his captain for breaking his word. Vallo allows El Libre and Consuelo to leave, but the king's guards are waiting. El Libre is killed and Consuelo is captured. The pirates mutiny against Vallo, and Humble Bellows is elected their new captain.

Baron Gruda takes the pirates prisoner and forces Consuelo to agree to marry the governor of Cobra. Vallo intends to rescue Consuelo, but the professor convinces him to first enlist the island's cooperation. In order to defeat the well-trained and well-armed troops on Cobra, the professor instructs the rebels to build a variety of futuristic weapons, such as tanks, Gatling guns, flamethrowers, a hot-air balloon, and a submarine. On the day of the wedding, the people overthrow the governor and his guards. A massive land and sea battle ensues and the pirate ship is destroyed, the Navy ship is captured, the baron is killed, and Vallo and Consuelo are reunited, passionately kissing in the maintop as the pirates celebrate on the captured ship below.

== Cast ==
- Burt Lancaster as Captain Vallo
- Nick Cravat as Ojo
- Eva Bartok as Consuelo
- Leslie Bradley as Baron Jose Gruda
- James Hayter as Professor Prudence
- Torin Thatcher as Humble Bellows
- Frederick Leister as El Libre
- Margot Grahame as Bianca
- Noel Purcell as Pablo Murphy
- Christopher Lee as Joseph (uncredited)
- Dana Wynter as Gruda's traveling companion

== Production ==
The screenplay was written by Waldo Salt, who had worked on The Flame and the Arrow (1950), a medieval adventure film starring Burt Lancaster and directed by Jacques Tourneur. The script was rejected by producer Harold Hecht and Warner Bros. Pictures, who feared that Salt's communist ties might be unfortunate in times of the Hollywood blacklist. The final script—written by Roland Kibbee, who would work on other Lancaster movies—retained some of Salt's political theme.

Director Robert Siodmak's team included Czech cinematographer Otto Heller, British director Vernon Sewell for the second unit, American special effects artist Russell Shearman—miniature effect, underwater photography—and, for the art department, British production designer Ken Adam, costume designer Margaret Furse and art director Paul Sheriff.

The role of Captain Vallo was seen as a confirmed departure for Lancaster, who had been known for dramatic roles in black-and-white noir films like The Killers (1946), directed by Siodmak, or Sorry, Wrong Number (1948), by Anatole Litvak.

The stunts—fight choreography, acrobatics—are performed by the same team as in The Flame and the Arrow: Lancaster, Nick Cravat, and Eddie Parker. In the 1930s, Lancaster and Cravat had created an acrobatic act, working at various circuses, like the Cole Bros. Circus, before Lancaster suffered a hand injury in 1939 that ended their act.

== Reception ==
In a contemporary review for The New York Times, critic A. H. Weiler called the film "a slam-bang, action-filled Technicolored lampoon" and wrote: "Any viewer with a drop of red blood in his veins and with fond memories of the Douglas Fairbanks Sr. school of derring-do should be happy to go on this last cruise of the crimson pirate. ... Burt Lancaster is truly a picture pirate."

In a review for Variety, William Brogdon wrote: "[T]his Norma production for Warners takes off on a chimerical flight that winds up as 104 minutes of high-action entertainment."

Critic Edwin Schallert of the Los Angeles Times wrote: "As a feature that emphasizes the fabulous it goes overboard into unreality, particularly when it attempts a scientific attack on the plot complexities amid historical surroundings. ... Summed up, 'The Crimson Pirate' is a good, gaudy, robust sort of feature designed for audience enjoyment, at least that kind of audience which enjoys complete release."

== Legacy ==
Burt Lancaster and partner Nick Cravat appeared in eight other films together. Lancaster kept Cravat on his payroll for life as both a trainer and a costar. Because Cravat's character in both The Crimson Pirate and The Flame and the Arrow (1950) is mute, the belief persisted that he was mute himself, but he was given no lines of dialogue because of his thick Brooklyn accent.

In the 1970s, Lancaster attempted to make a sequel. He hired George MacDonald Fraser and later Jon Cleary to write scripts, but no film resulted from their efforts.
