= Roland Kibbee =

American film and television screenwriter and producer (1914–1984)

Roland Kibbee (15 February 1914 in Monongahela, Pennsylvania – 5 August 1984 in Encino, California) was an American screenwriter and producer. He was a frequent collaborator and friend of actor-producer Burt Lancaster.

== Career ==
Kibbee began his career writing for radio in 1931, working with Jack Lescoulie, and later collaborated with Nat Hiken, writing for the series The Grouch Club, which starred Lescoulie. After this, Kibbee worked on Fred Allen's staff and wrote for Groucho Marx, before serving in the U.S. Air Force during World War II. Following his military service, he collaborated with Joseph Fields to write the screenplay for the Marx Brothers 1946 film A Night in Casablanca.

He frequently worked on films for Burt Lancaster, including The Crimson Pirate (1952), Vera Cruz (1954), The Devil's Disciple (1959), and Valdez Is Coming (1971). For a time they teamed to form "Norlan Productions". Together they wrote, produced and directed The Midnight Man (1974).

Some of his best-known films were A Night in Casablanca (1946), The Crimson Pirate (1952), The Appaloosa (1966) and Valdez Is Coming (1971).

Prominent TV producer and writer Norman Lear also acknowledged that while he would sometimes do the opening monologues for The Tennessee Ernie Ford Show, Kibbee was in fact the show's main writer. In a 2015 interview with Variety, Lear credited both Kibbee and Hiken as his two mentors.

He also wrote for TV shows, among them The Virginian, It Takes a Thief (which he created) and Columbo.

Kibbee won Emmy awards for his work on the short-lived 1961 series The Bob Newhart Show, Columbo and Barney Miller.

He is the (uncredited) author of the final voiceover script used for the theatrical cut of Blade Runner. Previous rejected iterations were written by Hampton Fancher, David Peoples and Darryl Ponicsan.

Late in his career, Kibbee co-wrote the book for the 1976 Yul Brynner musical Home Sweet Homer, which closed on Broadway after one performance.

== HUAC Informer ==
In the early '50s, Kibbee was named as a former member of the Communist party by screenwriter Martin Berkeley along with 155 others. Kibbee had become a member in 1937, "by way of the Hollywood Anti-Nazi League and out three years later by way of the Nazi-Soviet Pact".

He was also named by his colleague and Hecht-Lancaster executive Harold Hecht. Kibbee was then required to testify before the committee which he did, believing to have mostly named those who had named him.

Kibbee broke off with Hecht but continued to work for the company on a freelance basis. He retained his friendship with Lancaster, allegedly warning to distance himself from Hecht. Lancaster had been a vocal critic of the House Un-American Activities Committee.

Kibbee is one of the interview subjects in Naming Names, the definitive history of the Hollywood Blacklist by journalist Victor Navasky. The author discovered that like many who had testified, Kibbee was mistaken and had in fact given names that were not previously known to the committee.
