= Nick Cravat =

American actor and stunt performer

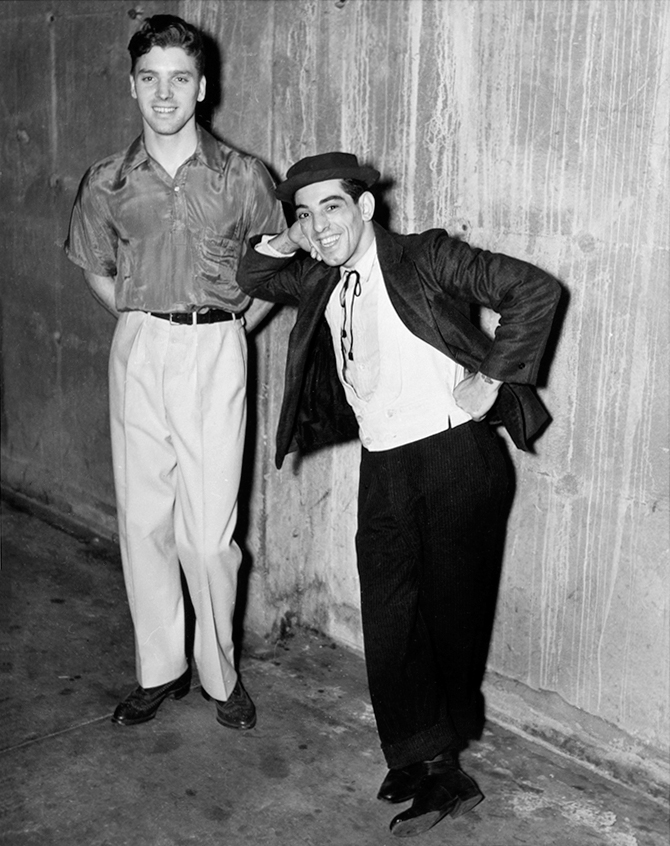
- Nick Cravat (right) with Burt Lancaster, performing as Lang and Cravat with the Federal Theatre Project Circus (1935–38)
- Born: Nicholas Cuccia; January 11, 1912; New York City, U.S.
- Died: January 29, 1994 (aged 82); Woodland Hills, California, U.S.
- Resting place: Valhalla Memorial Park Cemetery
- Occupations: Actor, stunt performer
- Years active: 1949–1977
- Spouse(s): Mae Ruth Simpkins Cuccia (?-1952; her death); Cecilia Brink
- Children: 2

William Shatner with Cravat as the gremlin (far shot, not in full costume) in The Twilight Zone episode "Nightmare at 20,000 Feet" (1963)

Nicholas Cuccia (pronounced coo-cha; January 11, 1912 – January 29, 1994), better known by his stage name Nick Cravat, was an American actor and stunt performer.

== Early life ==
Nicholas Cuccia was born in Manhattan, New York City. His real surname was Italian and considered too hard to pronounce, so he took a stage name, Cravat, from a character in a play he had seen and liked.

== Career ==
Cravat and Burt Lancaster met as youngsters at a summer camp in New York and became lifelong friends. They created an acrobatic act called Lang and Cravat in the early 1930s, and joined the Kay Brothers circus in Florida. The pair worked at various circuses and in vaudeville. In 1939, Lancaster suffered a hand injury that ended their act. They would later reunite. He co-starred with Lancaster in nine films, including The Flame and the Arrow (1950), The Crimson Pirate (1952), Run Silent, Run Deep (1958), The Scalphunters (1968) and The Island of Dr. Moreau (1977). He played a mute character in several films such as The Flame and the Arrow, The Crimson Pirate, Davy Crockett, King of the Wild Frontier (1955), and the TV series The Count of Monte Cristo, mostly because his thick Brooklyn accent would have been out of place. He also played the "gremlin" on the wing of an airplane in the 1963 Twilight Zone episode "Nightmare at 20,000 Feet".

== Personal life ==
Cravat's first wife was Mae Ruth Cuccia, also known as Arlene Cravat. He had two daughters from his second marriage, to Cecilia Brink: Marcelina "Marcy" Cravat-Overway and Christina "Tina" Cravat (a.k.a. Tina Cuccia).

Marcy Cravat is an environmental documentary filmmaker. Her debut film, Angel Azul, completed in 2014, won 12 awards. The film explores issues related to coral reefs through art activism. Dirt Rich, her second film, explores solutions to reverse the effects of global warming by re-stabilizing safe atmospheric carbon levels by returning carbon to the soil.

== Death ==
Cravat died of lung cancer in Woodland Hills, California, on January 29, 1994, at the age of 82. He was survived by his two daughters, Tina and Marcy. He is interred at North Hollywood's Valhalla Memorial Park Cemetery.

== Filmography ==
- My Friend Irma (1949) – Mushie (uncredited)
- The File on Thelma Jordon (1950) – Reporter (uncredited)
- The Flame and the Arrow (1950) – Piccolo
- Ten Tall Men (1951) – Disgruntled Riff (uncredited)
- The Crimson Pirate (1952) – Ojo
- The Veils of Bagdad (1953) – Ahmed
- King Richard and the Crusaders (1954) – Nectobanus
- 3 Ring Circus (1954) – Timmy
- Davy Crockett, King of the Wild Frontier (1955) – Busted Luck
- The Big Knife (1955) – Nick (uncredited)
- The Story of Mankind (1957) – Devil's Apprentice
- Run Silent, Run Deep (1958) – Russo
- Cat Ballou (1965) – Minor Role (uncredited)
- The Way West (1967) – Calvelli
- The Scalphunters (1968) – Yancy
- Airport (1970) – Nick Valli – Passenger (uncredited)
- Valdez Is Coming (1971) – Gang Member (uncredited)
- Ulzana's Raid (1972) – Trooper
- The Midnight Man (1974) – Gardener
- The Island of Dr. Moreau (1977) – M'Ling (final film role)
