= The First Time (1952 film) =

1952 film by Frank Tashlin

- Directed by: Frank Tashlin
- Screenplay by: Jean Rouverol; Hugo Butler; Frank Tashlin; Dane Lussier
- Based on: Story by Jean Rouverol; Hugo Butler
- Produced by: Harold Hecht
- Starring: Robert Cummings; Barbara Hale; Jeff Donnell
- Narrated by: Stuffy Singer
- Cinematography: Ernest Laszlo
- Edited by: Viola Lawrence
- Music by: Friedrich Hollaender
- Production companies: Norma Productions; Halburt Productions
- Distributed by: Columbia Pictures
- Release date: January 31, 1952
- Running time: 89 minutes
- Country: United States
- Language: English

The First Time is a 1952 American comedy drama film directed by Frank Tashlin and starring Robert Cummings, Barbara Hale and Jeff Donnell. The film was distributed by Columbia Pictures.

== Plot ==
Expectant parents Joe and Betsy Bennett eagerly await the arrival of their new baby. After the baby arrives, they discover the other side of parenting: sleepless nights, mounting expenses and little free time.

== Cast ==
- Robert Cummings as Joe Bennett
- Barbara Hale as Betsy Bennett
- Bill Goodwin as Mel Gilbert
- Jeff Donnell as Donna Gilbert
- Carl Benton Reid as Andrew Bennett
- Mona Barrie as Cassie Mayhew
- Kathleen Comegys as Florence Bennet
- Paul Harvey as Leeming
- Cora Witherspoon as Nurse Salisbury

== Production ==
The film, originally titled Small Wonder, was produced by Halburt, the production company of Harold Hecht and Burt Lancaster. Larry Parks had been cast in the leading role but was withdrawn from the project following his March 21, 1951 testimony before the House Un-American Activities Committee, during which he admitted to having been a communist. However, Columbia Pictures denied that his removal was related to his testimony and claimed that the change had been planned weeks earlier. Robert Cummings was announced as the male lead the following month.

The film entered production in late April 1951, still with the title of Small Wonder, and was completed in May. It was the first complete film directed by writer and former cartoonist Frank Tashlin.
