= The Devil's Disciple (1959 film) =

- Original window card
- Directed by: Guy Hamilton
- Screenplay by: John Dighton; Roland Kibbee
- Based on: The Devil's Disciple; 1897 play by George Bernard Shaw
- Produced by: Harold Hecht
- Starring: Burt Lancaster; Kirk Douglas; Laurence Olivier; Janette Scott
- Narrated by: Peter Leeds
- Cinematography: Jack Hildyard
- Edited by: Alan Osbiston
- Music by: Richard Rodney Bennett
- Production companies: Hecht-Hill-Lancaster Films; Brynaprod
- Distributed by: United Artists
- Release date: 20 August 1959
- Running time: 83 minutes
- Countries: United Kingdom; United States
- Language: English
- Budget: $1.5 million
- Box office: $1.8 million (est. US/ Canada rentals)

The Devil's Disciple is a 1959 film adaptation of the 1897 George Bernard Shaw play The Devil's Disciple. The Anglo-American film was directed by Guy Hamilton, who replaced Alexander Mackendrick, and starred Burt Lancaster, Kirk Douglas and Laurence Olivier. Mary Grant designed the film's costumes.

Lancaster and Douglas made several films together over the decades, including I Walk Alone (1948), Gunfight at the O.K. Corral (1957), The List of Adrian Messenger (1963), Seven Days in May (1964) and Tough Guys (1986).

== Plot ==
Richard "Dick" Dudgeon is apostate and outcast from his family in colonial Websterbridge, New Hampshire, who returns their hatred with scorn. After the death of his father, mistakenly hanged by the British as a rebel in nearby Springtown, Dick rescues his body from the gallows, where it had been left as an example to others. He leaves it for burial in the parish graveyard in Websterbridge. Dick then returns to his childhood home to hear the reading of his father's will, much to his family's dismay.

Local minister Rev. Anthony Anderson, almost arrested for trying to talk the British into taking the body down, treats Dick with courtesy, despite Dick's self-proclaimed apostasy. Dick's "wickedness," however, appalls Anderson's wife, Judith. To everyone's surprise, Dick's father left the bulk of his estate to Dick, his eldest son. His mother points out that her husband's wealth came from the large dowry she brought to the marriage, but he has left her with nothing. Cursing Dick, she then refuses to stay with him. Dick proclaims himself a rebel against the British and scorns his family as cowards for appeasing the British.

The British discover the father's grave. Anderson warns Dick that the British may arrest him for retrieving the body. He takes Dick home, thinking the British will not look for a disreputable outcast at a minister’s home. While Dick is there, Anderson is called to tend to Dick's sick mother. Dick is left alone with Anderson's wife, Judith, despite the social impropriety. Before Anderson's return, British soldiers enter Anderson's home and arrest Dick, mistaking him for Anderson. They believe Anderson illegally retrieved the body. Dick allows them to take him away without revealing his actual identity. He swears Judith to secrecy lest her husband be arrested for Dick's crime. In a state of great agitation, Judith finds her husband, who asks if Dick has harmed her. Breaking her promise to Dick, Judith reveals that soldiers came to arrest Anderson, but Dick went in his place, stunning Anderson. Anderson tells Judith to have Dick keep quiet as long as possible, to give him "more start," then rides away. Judith is unaware that Anderson has gone to seek help from Lawyer Hawkins, secretly the leader of the local rebels, to negotiate giving himself up in exchange for Dick (if Anderson just gave himself up, the British would keep them both). Judith believes her husband to be a coward and now sees Dick, whom she previously despised, as a hero. She willingly kisses Dick farewell.

Before a military tribunal, observed by General Burgoyne, Dick is skeptical about British justice, pointing out the scaffolding being built to hang him. He keeps up the pretense of being Anderson during the questioning until Judith tries to save him by revealing that he is not her husband. Regardless of the mistaken identity, Dick is insulting enough to the British to condemn himself. He sardonically states that making up their minds to hang a man puts the tribunal at a disadvantage; the accused might just as well be hanged for a sheep as a lamb. Burgoyne now sarcastically observes to the prosecutor that he is to be congratulated; despite the deplorable error in identity and the prisoner's undoubted innocence at the start of the proceedings, the prosecutor managed to provoke the accused into guilt—a forensic triumph.

Meanwhile, Anderson decides to abandon his ministry and turn rebel. In Springtown, a battle is going on. Anderson enters a house that the British have commandeered that is next to their ammunition dump. Fighting off British soldiers, Anderson sets fire to the British ammunition dump, which explodes. He then dons the clothes of a Loyalist courier carrying an urgent message from General Howe to General Burgoyne. Reaching the village where Dick is about to be hanged, he presents a safe conduct from General Phillips, whom the rebels have captured in Springtown. Terms are the withdrawal of British troops and the immediate release of Richard Dudgeon. Since Howe is still in New York and not coming for relief, Burgoyne accedes to the demands. Anderson rises in his wife's esteem, who chooses to remain with him rather than go off with Dick.

== Cast ==
- Burt Lancaster – Reverend Anthony Anderson
- Kirk Douglas – Richard "Dick" Dudgeon
- Laurence Olivier – General John Burgoyne
- Janette Scott – Judith Anderson
- Eva Le Gallienne – Mrs. Dudgeon
- Harry Andrews – Major Swindon
- Basil Sydney – Lawyer Hawkins
- George Rose – British sergeant
- Neil McCallum – Christopher (Christie) Dudgeon
- Mervyn Johns – Reverend Maindeck Parshotter
- David Horne – Uncle William
- Erik Chitty – Uncle Titus
- Allan Cuthbertson – British captain
- Percy Herbert – British lieutenant
- Phyllis Morris – Wife of Titus
- Brian Oulton – Chaplain Brudenell
- Jenny Jones – Essie
- Sheree Winton – Platinum Blond
- Steven Berkoff – British Corporal

== Production and reception ==
The play was among those by George Bernard Shaw whose film rights were purchased by Gabriel Pascal in 1938; A planned production was announced several times in the years that followed. The rights were acquired from Pascal's estate by the production company of Burt Lancaster and Harold Hecht in 1955. The film was shot at Associated British Studios in Elstree, near London, England between late July and mid-October 1958. In early August, the production company announced original director Alexander Mackendrick had been replaced by Guy Hamilton.

A.H. Weiler in The New York Times argued admirers of Shaw's "plays would be a mite confused by this copiously edited and re-written edition of his noted lampoon of American Revolutionary events and some Englishmen involved in losing a valuable colony." This adaptation "is, somewhat disappointingly, less the biting satire of the stage and more an unevenly paced comedy-melodrama leaning heavily toward action. ... Shaw's meticulous development of character and a healthy portion of his gibes and barbs are merely shadowy effects here".

== See also ==
- List of American films of 1959
- List of films about the American Revolution
- List of television series and miniseries about the American Revolution
