= The Midnight Man (1974 film) =

1974 film by Roland Kibbee

- film poster
- Directed by: Roland Kibbee; Burt Lancaster
- Screenplay by: Roland Kibbee; Burt Lancaster
- Based on: The Midnight Lady and the Mourning Man by David Anthony
- Produced by: Roland Kibbee; Burt Lancaster
- Starring: Burt Lancaster; Susan Clark; Cameron Mitchell; Morgan Woodward; Harris Yulin; Robert Quarry; Joan Lorring; Lawrence Dobkin; Ed Lauter; Mills Watson; Charles Tyner; Catherine Bach
- Cinematography: Jack Priestley
- Edited by: Frank Morriss
- Music by: Dave Grusin
- Color process: Technicolor
- Production company: Norlan Productions
- Distributed by: Universal Pictures
- Release date: June 14, 1974
- Running time: 119 minutes
- Country: United States
- Language: English

The Midnight Man is a 1974 American neo noir mystery film starring and co-directed by Burt Lancaster. The film also stars Susan Clark, Cameron Mitchell, Morgan Woodward, Harris Yulin, Robert Quarry, Joan Lorring, Lawrence Dobkin, Ed Lauter, Mills Watson, Charles Tyner and Catherine Bach.

== Plot ==
Former Chicago policeman Jim Slade is paroled from prison, where he had served time for shooting his wife's lover in their bed. He goes to live with his married friends Quartz and Judy in a small town where he has been offered a job as a night watchman at a college.

A college student is murdered and local sheriff Casey tries to pin the crime on a creepy janitor who spouts biblical revelation while hiding pornography. Slade pursues an unauthorized investigation of his own.

Natalie, the murdered student, is the daughter of Senator Clayborne, who subsequently receives blackmail letters related to tapes of her confession to a psychiatric counselor that she had an incestuous relationship with her father. Slade questions possible suspects, including the senator, Natalie's estranged boyfriend Arthur King (who declares to Slade that the generation gap "just got a little wider"), psychology professor Dean Collins and a nerdy student whose taped psychiatric rant was also stolen.

All the while, Slade is warned against overstepping his authority as a mere night watchman, no longer a cop, by his parole officer Linda Thorpe and by Quartz. A brief affair between Slade and Thorpe begins. A family of thugs led by a Ma Barker-type mother arrives, and they are revealed to be agents paid by some corrupt members of the sheriff's department to do their dirty work.

Slade realizes that the parole officer and Quartz are the perpetrators of the murder, because only Quartz could have known a certain critical clue involved in the cover-up. Sheriff Casey arrests Quartz. As they depart, Slade confronts Thorpe, who produces the stolen tapes that are hidden in her freezer.

The sheriff offers Slade an apology and a job even though Slade cannot hold a position with the law as a convicted felon.

== Cast ==
- Burt Lancaster as Jim Slade
- Susan Clark as Linda Thorpe
- Cameron Mitchell as Quartz Willinger
- Morgan Woodward as Senator Phillip Clayborne
- Harris Yulin as Sheriff Jack Casey
- Robert Quarry as Dr. Prichette
- Joan Lorring as Judy Willinger
- Lawrence Dobkin as Waldo Mason
- Ed Lauter as Leroy
- Mills Watson as "Cash"
- Charles Tyner as R.W. Ewing
- Catherine Bach as Natalie Clayborne
- Bill Lancaster as Arthur King
- Quinn Redeker as Swanson
- Eleanor Ross as Nell
- Richard Winterstein as Virgil
- William T. Hicks as Charlie
- Peter Dane as Karl Metterman
- Linda Kelsey as Betty Childress
- William Splawn as Eddie Lamar
- Susan MacDonald as Elaine
- Joel Gordon Kravitz as Lester Pearlman
- Nick Cravat as Sam, The Gardener
- Rodney Stevens as Jimmy Gill
- Weems Oliver Baskin III as The Bartender
- Jean Perkins as Nurse
- Harold N. Cooledge Jr. as Dean Collins
- Gene Lehfeldt as Casey's Driver
- William Clark as Deputy
- Elizabeth Black as The Bus Dispatcher
- Rachel Ray as Parolee
- David Garrison as The Photographer
- Hugh Parsons as The Grocery Clerk
- Lonnie Kay as The Hostess
- G. Warren Smith as The Director
- Lucille Meredith as The Radio Evangelist
- Mal Alberts as The Basketball Announcer

== Production ==
Burt Lancaster shared directing credit with Roland Kibbee, and shared writing credit with Kibbee and author David Anthony, upon whose 1969 novel The Midnight Lady and the Mourning Man the film was based. The film was not a major success and Lancaster did not consider it to be among his better work. Other than 1955's The Kentuckian, this was Lancaster's only film as a director.

The film marked the first screen appearance of future television star Catherine Bach.

The Midnight Man was filmed in Clemson and the counties of Anderson and Pickens in South Carolina. Filming began on February 13, 1973, with the opening scenes in which Jim Slade arrives by bus.

The film was released on June 10, 1974, in New York and nationwide on June 14. It premiered at the Astro III theater in Clemson on March 14, 1974, with a red-carpet ceremony.
