= National Board of Review Awards 1955 =

Annual US film awards ceremony

27th National Board of Review Awards

December 20, 1955

The 27th National Board of Review Awards were announced on December 20, 1955.

== Top Ten Films ==
1. Marty
2. East of Eden
3. Mister Roberts
4. Bad Day at Black Rock
5. Summertime
6. The Rose Tattoo
7. A Man Called Peter
8. Not as a Stranger
9. Picnic
10. The African Lion

== Top Foreign Films ==
1. The Prisoner
2. The Great Adventure
3. The Divided Heart
4. Diabolique
5. The End of the Affair

== Winners ==
- Best Film: Marty
- Best Foreign Film: The Prisoner
- Best Actor: Ernest Borgnine (Marty)
- Best Actress: Anna Magnani (The Rose Tattoo)
- Best Supporting Actor: Charles Bickford (Not as a Stranger)
- Best Supporting Actress: Marjorie Rambeau (A Man Called Peter, The View from Pompey's Head)
- Best Director: William Wyler (The Desperate Hours)
