= The Island of Dr. Moreau (1977 film) =

1977 American film directed by Don Taylor

- Original theatrical poster
- Directed by: Don Taylor
- Written by: Al Ramrus; John Herman Shaner
- Based on: The Island of Doctor Moreau by H. G. Wells
- Produced by: Skip Steloff; John Temple-Smith
- Starring: Burt Lancaster; Michael York; Nigel Davenport; Barbara Carrera; Richard Basehart; Nick Cravat
- Cinematography: Gerry Fisher
- Edited by: Marion Rothman
- Music by: Laurence Rosenthal
- Distributed by: American International Pictures
- Release date: July 13, 1977
- Running time: 98 minutes
- Country: United States
- Language: English
- Budget: $6 million
- Box office: $4 million

The Island of Dr. Moreau is a 1977 American science fiction horror film directed by Don Taylor, the second English-language adaptation of H. G. Wells' 1896 novel of the same name, following Island of Lost Souls (1932).

Starring Burt Lancaster, Michael York, Nigel Davenport, Barbara Carrera and Richard Basehart, the plot follows a scientist who attempts to convert animals into human beings. The make-up for the "Humanimals" characters was created by John Chambers.

== Plot ==
In 1911, three men are floating in a lifeboat in the middle of the Pacific Ocean following the wreck of the ship Lady Vain. One dies at sea. After seventeen days at sea, the two remaining survivors land on an island, where one is killed by animals. The last survivor, Lady Vain's engineer Braddock, is nursed back to health in the compound governed by the scientist Dr. Moreau. The other inhabitants of the compound include Moreau's associate, mercenary Montgomery; Moreau's mute, misshapen servant, M'Ling; and Maria, a young woman. Moreau warns Braddock not to leave the compound at night.

Moreau welcomes Braddock as an honoured guest and shares his library. One day, Braddock witnesses Moreau and Montgomery manhandling a chained creature who is not human; the island is home to more than just this one. They are the hybrid products of Moreau's experiments upon various species of wild animal. Moreau is injecting them with a serum containing human genetic material as part of his goal to perfect life. At times, the human-animal hybrids still have their animal instincts and do not behave like a human. This enraged Moreau; who Braddock witnessed whipping a Bear-Man for this reason. That night, Maria goes up to her room to find Braddock in it. They then consummate their mutual attraction; failing to see Moreau spying.

The following day, Braddock takes a rifle and leaves the compound, determined to see how the hybrid creatures live. He enters a cave and finds several of them. The Sayer of the Law, an Ape-Man, speaks the three laws the scientist passed on to them: no going around on all fours; no eating of human flesh; and no taking of other life. A Tiger-Man attacks Braddock; only to be captured by Montgomery. Moreau has the Tiger-Man dragged to his laboratory which the man-beasts call "the House of Pain" as punishment for breaking the law.

Braddock objects to Moreau's oppressive treatment of the man-beasts. Moreau replies by lecturing his views of compassion as a weakness and humanity's superiority over animals, and justified himself by saying how eating flesh would revert the man-beasts further and cause them to turn on humanity. He injects the Tiger-Man to humanize him further.

A Bull-Man objects to the laws, believing it is better to be an animal. In a tantrum, he kills a tiger; provoking Moreau who leads a hunt. Braddock finds it in the jungle, badly injured, where it begs him to kill it rather than return it to the lab. Braddock shoots it. This angers the man-beasts as Braddock has broken the law of killing.

Outraged by Moreau's oppression, Braddock prepares to leave the island with Maria. Moreau stops them and straps Braddock to the table in his lab. He then injects him with another serum so that he can hear Braddock describe the experience of becoming animalistic. Caged, Braddock struggles to maintain his humanity. When Montgomery objects to this treatment and threatens Moreau's life, Moreau shoots him with a pistol.

M'Ling reveals Montgomery's dead body to the man-beasts who turn on Moreau; realizing he was a fraud who was just using them. Moreau is mortally wounded at the compound's gate while trying to whip his attackers into submission. The man-beasts, overpowered by their anger, go on a rampage; seeking to wipe out humanity.

Braddock (still struggling to remain human), Maria, M'Ling, and the still-coherent and benign beastfolk servant women stave them off. Braddock resists killing Moreau, who dies of his injuries. Braddock uses the corpse as a diversion so they can escape through the compound. Eventually, the man-beasts break in and the compound is burned. In the chaos, the wild animals which Moreau kept for his experiments are turned loose and a battle ensues between them and the hybrids. Most of the man-beasts are killed by the animals or consumed by the fire, including the Sayer of the Law's. During their escape, M'Ling risks his life to save his companions from a lion and both fall into a pit trap.

Braddock and Maria float away in the lifeboat that Braddock arrived in, but are followed by the Hyena-Man, one of the last man-beasts. In the ensuing battle, Braddock kills the Hyena-Man with a broken oar. Sometime later, they see a passing ship, and the serum has worn off, returning Braddock to his full human state as Maria looks on with changed, feline eyes.

== Cast ==
- Burt Lancaster as Dr. Paul Moreau
- Michael York as Andrew Braddock
- Nigel Davenport as Montgomery
- Barbara Carrera as Maria
- Richard Basehart as Sayer of the Law
- Nick Cravat as M'Ling
- The Great John L. as Boar-Man
- Bob Ozman as Bull-Man
- Fumio Demura as Hyena-Man
- Gary Baxley as Lion-Man
- John Gillespie as Tiger-Man
- David Cass as Bear-Man

== Production ==
The film was second in American International Pictures' H. G. Wells film cycle, following The Food of the Gods (1976) and preceding Empire of the Ants (1977). The films' producers originally planned to shoot the film in either the Canary Islands or Malta, but decided on the United States Virgin Islands after its Chamber of Commerce and its Governor Cyril E. King lobbied Sandy Howard. Filming began on Saint Croix on December 13, 1976, with a $7.265 million budget.

Lancaster has been described as perfectly matching Wells' description of Moreau's physical appearance, unlike the other two actors to play the role on screen, Charles Laughton in Island of Lost Souls (1932) and Marlon Brando in The Island of Dr. Moreau (1996), both of whom were portly and had receding hair.

The fifteen actors featured as human-animal hybrids in the film required a team of 12 makeup artists who would need four hours to apply the cosmetics required for their parts and one hour to remove them. The 26 animals featured in the film were given affection training by Toni and Ralph Helfer at the Enchanted Village of Buena Park, California, and then shipped from Miami to Saint Croix. Barbara Carrera's character Maria was created for the film as the combination of the characters Lota and Ruth Thomas created by Waldemar Young and Philip Wylie for the first film adaptation of the original novel Island of Lost Souls (1932).

Carrera claims there were three or four different endings imagined, including one in which her character gave birth to a kitten. That version was favored by producer John Temple-Smith, which York flatly refused to do. Director Taylor said that he did not take it seriously and the footage was never shot.

A comic-book adaptation was released by Marvel Comics the same year. Written by Doug Moench and illustrated by Larry Hama, the comic-book adaptation had a slightly less happy ending than the film, with Maria reverting into a cat-woman just before help arrives.

== Release ==
The Island of Dr. Moreau premiered on July 13, 1977, in the United States. Lorber Films released the film under its Kino Lorber Studio Classics imprint available for the first time on Blu-ray in the U.S.

=== Critical reception ===
On review aggregator Rotten Tomatoes, The Island of Dr. Moreau holds an approval rating of 52%, based on 25 reviews. Its consensus reads: "The Island of Dr. Moreau takes a reasonably entertaining pass at adapting its classic source material, although key scenes are let down by struggles with special effects".

== See also ==
The other film versions of the novel:

- Island of Lost Souls (1932) starring Charles Laughton and Bela Lugosi.
- The Island of Dr. Moreau (1996) starring Marlon Brando and Val Kilmer. This was the least commercially and critically successful adaptation of the three with a notorious production history. This 1996 film would spawn a documentary called Lost Soul: The Doomed Journey of Richard Stanley's Island of Dr. Moreau (2014), documenting the film's turbulent production.
