= The Flame and the Arrow =

1950 film by Jacques Tourneur

- Promotional poster
- Directed by: Jacques Tourneur
- Written by: Waldo Salt
- Produced by: Harold Hecht; Frank Ross
- Starring: Burt Lancaster; Virginia Mayo
- Cinematography: Ernest Haller
- Edited by: Alan Crosland Jr.
- Music by: Max Steiner
- Production companies: Norma Productions; Frank Ross Productions
- Distributed by: Warner Bros. Pictures
- Release dates: July 7, 1950 (New York); July 21, 1950 (Los Angeles)
- Running time: 88 minutes
- Country: United States
- Language: English
- Budget: $1,608,000
- Box office: $5,626,000

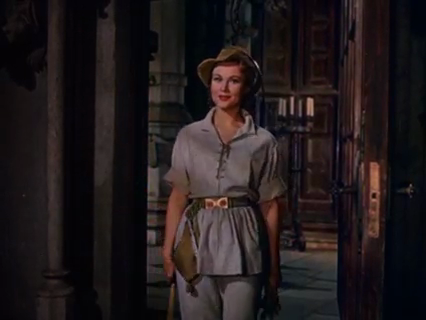
Virginia Mayo in The Flame and the Arrow

The Flame and the Arrow is a 1950 American Technicolor historical adventure film released by Warner Bros. Pictures and starring Burt Lancaster, Virginia Mayo and Nick Cravat. It was directed by Jacques Tourneur and produced by Harold Hecht and Frank Ross from a screenplay by Waldo Salt. The music score was written by Max Steiner and the cinematography was led by Ernest Haller.

== Plot ==
During the reign of Frederick Barbarossa in Lombardy, Dardo Bartoli has brought his son Rudi to the town to see Count Ulrich, known as "the Hawk", who is accompanied by his niece, Lady Anne, and his mistress, Dardo's unfaithful wife Francesca. Dardo shows his archery skills by shooting Ulrich's expensive hunting hawk from the sky. In revenge, the count orders that Dardo's son be taken to his castle. Dardo is struck by an arrow while fleeing with Rudi, who allows himself to be captured in order to draw the soldiers away.

At the palace, young Marchese Alessandro de Granazia, to whom Ulrich plans to marry Anne or political reasons, refuses to pay Ulrich's taxes. In retaliation, Ulrich orders de Granazia's arrest and confiscation of his land and property. After his rescue by Dardo, the marchese joins Dardo's band of outlaws. Dardo makes another attempt to free his son. Acting on information provided by his uncle Papa Pietro Bartoli, Dardo obtains the help of Anne's maid (one of Dardo's many lovers) to sneak into Ulrich's castle along with his best friend Piccolo, but the rescue proves unsuccessful. When they find themselves in Lady Anne's apartment, Piccolo suggests that they kidnap her instead. They take her to their secret hideout, where she tries several times to escape, but Dardo is too crafty for her.

Dardo sends a message to the count offering an exchange of prisoners, but Ulrich threatens to execute Papa Pietro unless Anne is released. Dardo and the others race to the village and rescue Bartoli. Then Dardo learns from his aunt Nonna that five more prisoners have been taken to hang in Papa's place. Dardo surrenders to save the others and is hanged in front of his son. Ulrich takes the rest of the rebels prisoner, including the marchese.

The marchese informs Ulrich that the rebels are planning an attack the next day and that Dardo is still alive; the executioner had been replaced by Dardo's friend, the Skinner. As a reward for this betrayal, Ulrich agrees to the marchese's marriage to Anne. When she learns of their plans, she warns Nonna Bartoli, with Dardo and his men hiding around the corner, and they resolve to attack immediately.

Piccolo devises a plan for entering the castle that involves the men posing as acrobats providing entertainment. The ruse works, and when they are ready, they remove their disguises and a battle ensues. During the melee, Anne warns Dardo that Ulrich has gone for his son. When Dardo finds Ulrich, he is in the company of the marchese. The count leaves Dardo and the marchese to fight. Although Dardo tries to persuade the marchese to stand aside, the marchese refuses, trusting in his swordsmanship. Dardo plunges the room into darkness, where his hunter's instinct gives him the fatal edge.

Dardo later finds his wife dead, killed by a knife in the back while trying to protect Rudi. From the ramparts, he sees the count far below holding Rudi with a dagger at his throat, using him as a human shield to effect his escape. Dardo finds a bow and uses it to kill Ulrich and frees his son. With the battle won, Dardo embraces his son and Anne together.

== Cast ==
- Burt Lancaster as Dardo Bartoli
- Virginia Mayo as Anne de Hesse
- Nick Cravat as Piccolo
- Norman Lloyd as Apollo, the troubadour
- Robert Douglas as Marchese Alessandro de Granazia
- Robin Hughes as Skinner
- Victor Kilian as Apothecary Mazzoni
- Francis Pierlot as Papa Pietro Bartoli
- Aline MacMahon as Nonna Bartoli
- Frank Allenby as Count Ulrich, "The Hawk"
- Gordon Gebert as Rudi Bartoli
- Lynn Baggett as Francesca
- Ruth Hampton as Lucrecia (uncredited)

== Production ==
In preparation for his physical role, Burt Lancaster ran three miles, worked on the bars and rings, played handball and swam each day for three months.

== Reception ==
In a contemporary review for The New York Times, Bosley Crowther wrote: "[N]ot since—well, we can't remember—have the movies had such an all-out spread of luxuriously romantic hokum as they have in this Tehcnicolored film. ... [T]he screen play, prepared by Waldo Salt, is a rich and alive accumulation of swashy adventure episodes, and Jacques Tourneur has staged it with his hand on the throttle and his tongue in his cheek. ... Taken simply as a story, it falls all over itself. The important thing is the rush of incident that flows through the picture unchecked and the gay, uninhibited spirit of roughhouse in which it is played."

Critic Edwin Schallert of the Los Angeles Times called The Flame and the Arrow "a unique example of entertainment" and wrote: "'The Flame and the Arrow' is good release entertainment, acted heartily by its large cast, with Lancaster and Cravat perpetually doing stunts of intriguing impact. The picture treats everything that happens in the lightest vein, almost to the point of satire, yet still amazingly sincere."

According to Warner Bros. records, the film earned $2,737,000 domestically and $2,889,000 foreign, making it the studio's most popular film of the year.

Warner Bros. offered $1 million to anyone who could prove that Lancaster did not perform all his stunts for the film. After someone claimed that Don Turner performed some of the stunts, Warner Bros. refused to pay, and a breach of contract claim was filed. The studio claimed that Turner did not perform the stunts within the term of the offer and it they had withdrawn the offer before the claim was filed. The appeals-court judge ruled against the claim.

== Accolades ==
The Flame and the Arrow was nominated for the Academy Award for Best Cinematography (Color) (Ernest Haller) and Best Musical Score of a Dramatic or Comedy Picture (Max Steiner), but won in neither category.
