= Valdez Is Coming =

1971 American Western film

- Theatrical release poster
- Directed by: Edwin Sherin
- Screenplay by: Roland Kibbee; David Rayfiel
- Based on: Valdez Is Coming by Elmore Leonard
- Produced by: Ira Steiner
- Starring: Burt Lancaster; Susan Clark
- Cinematography: Gábor Pogány
- Edited by: James T. Heckert; George R. Rohrs
- Music by: Charles Gross
- Production companies: Norlan Productions; Ira Steiner Productions
- Distributed by: United Artists
- Release date: April 9, 1971 (U.S.)
- Running time: 90 minutes
- Country: United States
- Language: English

Valdez Is Coming is a 1971 American Western film directed by Edwin Sherin and starring Burt Lancaster, Susan Clark, Richard Jordan and Jon Cypher. The film is based on the 1970 Elmore Leonard novel of the same name.

== Plot ==
Aging town constable Bob Valdez (Burt Lancaster) is tricked into killing an innocent African-American man by powerful rancher Frank Tanner (Jon Cypher), whose hired gun R.L. Davis (Richard Jordan) shot up the hovel where the wrongly accused man and his Indian wife were trapped. Valdez believes it would be a fair gesture to raise $200 for the widow, $100 from Tanner and the rest from others in town.

Tanner is livid at the old man's suggestion. He orders ranch hand El Segundo (Barton Heyman) and his men to tie Valdez to a heavy wooden cross and drive him into the desert. The central pole is so long that Valdez must walk bent over. He finds an oasis blocked by two trees that he repeatedly tries to ram with the ends of the cross. When it finally breaks, the jagged ends are driven into Valdez's back.

Davis finds him and cuts the ropes, freeing the unconscious man. The badly injured Valdez crawls to the ranch of his friend Diego (Frank Silvera), where he is nursed back to health. Unfortunately for Tanner, he has picked on the wrong man: Valdez is a wily, experienced Indian fighter and a marksman with a rifle. He dons his old cavalry uniform and sends Tanner a message via one of the rancher's wounded men (Héctor Elizondo): "Valdez is coming."

Valdez sneaks into the compound and, during the ensuing gun battle and his escape, kidnaps Tanner's woman, Gay Erin (Susan Clark), for whose favors it is rumored that Tanner had her husband killed. With her in restraints, Valdez proceeds to systematically do away with the men Tanner sends after him with his long-range Sharps rifle. The only one he shows mercy to is Davis, after the gunman screams, "I cut you loose! I cut you loose!" and reveals that the cut on the left wrist of Valdez concealed under his glove came when his knife slipped as he cut the ropes off.

Now he has two hostages. While hiding from Tanner's posse, Valdez realizes that Gay Erin knows who killed her husband. Valdez confronts her and she admits that it was she who killed her own husband to be with Tanner, not the other way around. He sets her free, but by now Tanner's woman is sympathetic to his cause, feeling guilty because she was the cause of all the deaths so far.

Despite Gay Erin's help, Valdez is finally surrounded and captured. Tanner and his men ride up. The men are ordered to shoot, but R.L. Davis backs off, showing he has no gun, and El Segundo calls his men aside, refusing to obey orders. That leaves Tanner to do his own dirty work—if he can.

Tanner turns out to be a coward one-on-one. Gay makes it clear she will not return to Tanner. Tanner helplessly snarls at Valdez, "I should have killed you three days ago." He calmly replies, "Or paid the $100."

== Cast ==
- Burt Lancaster as Constable Bob Valdez
- Susan Clark as Gay Erin
- Jon Cypher as Frank Tanner
- Frank Silvera as Diego
- Richard Jordan as R.L. Davis
- Phil Brown as Malson
- Barton Heyman as "El Segundo"
- Héctor Elizondo as Mexican Rider
- Ralph Brown as Beaudry
- Werner Hasselmann as Sheriff
- Lex Monson as Rincon
- Sylvia Poggioli as Segundo's Girl
- José García García as Carlos
- María Montez as Anita
- Juanita Penaloza as Indian Woman

== Production ==
The film was filmed in southern Spain in locales used by Italian filmmaker Sergio Leone in his European "spaghetti" Westerns. The desert-like terrain of this isolated region of Spain resembles the U.S. southwest and parts of Sonora, Mexico, though the vegetation is not the same.

When director Sydney Pollack was attached to the property, Lancaster was originally slated to play Frank Tanner with Marlon Brando as Valdez. These plans failed to materialize when Lancaster got involved in the 1970 movie Airport.

== Reception ==
The film received primarily mediocre to negative reviews. Vincent Canby of The New York Times praised Lancaster's on-screen presence but wrote that, "A lot of fancy flourishes, which I associate with Mr. Sherin's stage work, are apparent in the film, as in its picturesque groupings of picturesque characters, and in a musical score that's much given to comment on the action."

When the film was released to video, Ty Burr of Entertainment Weekly wrote that, "Slow and choppy, Valdez manages an astounding feat: It drains Lancaster of personality."
