= They Cracked Her Glass Slipper =

1941 novel by Gerald Butler

- Cover artwork of Jarrolds Publishing's 1941 first hardcover edition.
- Author: Gerald Butler
- Language: English
- Genre: Crime, thriller
- Set in: London
- Publisher: Jarrolds
- Publication date: 18 December 1941
- Publication place: United Kingdom
- Media type: Print
- OCLC: 557660900

They Cracked Her Glass Slipper is a 1941 crime thriller novel by English writer Gerald Butler. It is his second novel, and was published by Jarrolds Publishing on 18 December 1941. It follows the hardboiled style of his best-selling debut, Kiss the Blood Off My Hands. It is Butler's only novel (aside from his 1972 comeback, There Is a Death, Elizabeth) not to have received an American publication (Farrar & Rinehart and its successor Rinehart & Company published all his other books in the United States).

== Film adaptation ==
In 1949 it was adapted into the British film Third Time Lucky with Butler developing the screenplay from his own novel. Directed by Gordon Parry it starred Glynis Johns, Dermot Walsh and Charles Goldner.

== Publication history ==
- 18 December 1941 Jarrolds Publishing, UK, first hardcover edition
- 1944 Jarrolds Publishing, UK, hardcover edition (re-print)
- 1945 Jarrolds Publishing, UK, hardcover edition (re-print)
- 25 May 1947 Éditions du bateau ivre, France, hardcover edition under the title Cendrillon perd au jeu, translated by Jacqueline Richard (part of the Climats series)
