= Gerald Butler (writer) =

English writer and screenwriter (1907–1988)

- Butler pictured in the dust jacket of his 1951 novel Choice of Two Women
- Born: Gerald Alfred Butler; 31 July 1907; Crewe, Cheshire, England
- Died: 1 February 1988 (aged 80); Eastbourne, East Sussex, England
- Occupations: Novelist, screenwriter, chemist
- Writing career
- Period: 1940–1972
- Genres: Crime, thriller, pulp

Gerald Alfred Butler (31 July 1907 – 1 February 1988) was an English crime, thriller and pulp writer and screenwriter. He was sometimes referred to as the "English James M. Cain", and his characters were noted as amoral and hardboiled. His novels include the best-seller Kiss the Blood Off My Hands (1940), as well as They Cracked Her Glass Slipper (1941), Their Rainbow Had Black Edges (1943), Mad with Much Heart (1945), Slippery Hitch (1948), Choice of Two Women (1951), and his late career come-back There Is a Death, Elizabeth (1972). His stories have been translated and published in multiple languages, including French, Swedish, German, and Finnish.

Four of his novels were optioned by film production companies, including Warner Brothers Pictures (Slippery Hitch, unmade), Eagle-Lion Films (Kiss the Blood Off My Hands, unmade), Charles K. Feldman Group Productions (Kiss the Blood Off My Hands, unmade), Norma Productions / Harold Hecht Productions / Universal-International Pictures (Kiss the Blood Off My Hands, 1948), Anglofilm / General Film Distributors (They Cracked Her Glass Slipper, made as Third Time Lucky, 1949), and RKO Radio Pictures (Mad with Much Heart, made as On Dangerous Ground, 1951). In addition to adapting his own novel for the screenplay of Third Time Lucky, Butler also wrote the screenplay for the Anglofilm / Columbia Pictures movie The Fatal Night (1948), adapted from Michael Arlen's short story, "The Gentleman from America." American radio program Lux Radio Theatre also broadcast an adaptation of Kiss the Blood Off My Hands, under the title The Unafraid, on Columbia Broadcast System in 1949.

== Biography ==
Gerald Alfred Butler was born on 31 July 1907, in Crewe, Cheshire, England, to Harold George Butler and Eva Beatrix (née Rutt). His father was born in West Wycombe and was briefly a football player with the Wycombe Wanderers. He had two sisters, Doris Eva and Joan W.; they grew up in Muswell Hill, London.

Butler worked as a £1 a week shipping clerk, and then as a chemist early in his career, before becoming a writer for the advertising and public relations firm Pritchard, Wood and Partners Limited, based on Savile Row, London, eventually becoming its creative director.

He was 33 years old when his first novel, Kiss the Blood Off My Hands, was published by Nicholson & Watson in April 1940. The novel was written as a distraction while staying in air-raid shelters while the Germans bombed London during World War II. Kiss the Blood Off My Hands was accepted by the first publisher Butler contacted, Nicholson & Watson (whose building was ironically destroyed by a German bombing shortly after publication), and became a best-seller, leading to a publishing contract with Jarrolds Publishing and a reprint of the book. By 1945, the novel had sold over 232,000 copies in England alone (all during war-time). The Digit Books re-print of Butler's sixth novel, Choice of Two Women, published in 1960, stated that Kiss the Blood Off My Hands had sold in excess of 750,000 copies, and an article about the writer in 1972 stated it had sold in seven countries.

His second novel, They Cracked Her Glass Slipper, was published in December 1941, followed by Their Rainbow Had Black Edges in July 1943, and then Mad with Much Heart in June 1945, all via Jarrolds Publishing. In November 1945, American publishers Farrar & Rinehart were the first to publish one of Butler's novels outside of England. Their first release of Butler's work was his 1943 novel, Their Rainbow Had Black Edges, issued under the alternative title Dark Rainbow. Farrar & Rinehart (and its successor Rinehart & Company) went on to publish four more of his novels for the American market between 1946 and 1951: Kiss the Blood Off My Hands (March 1946), Mad with Much Heart (August 1946), Slippery Hitch (April 1949), and Blow Hot, Blow Cold (July 1951).

Following the publication of his first four novels in Britain (and first one in America), Hollywood film studio Warner Brothers Pictures optioned the screen rights of his fifth novel, Slippery Hitch, for £10,000. At the time of purchase, in December 1946, the novel had yet to be published, and would be held back from publication for another year and a half, until May 1948. Butler was also offered to work for Warner Brothers Pictures as a contract screenwriter, but turned it down. The novel was assigned to producer Jerry Wald's unit at Warner Brothers Pictures, and remained in pre-production for over two years, before being abandoned by mid-1949.

In early 1947, Eagle-Lion Films bought the film rights to Kiss the Blood Off My Hands, hoping to shoot it with Robert Donat in the lead. After the option expired, the novel's film rights were sold to actor-turned-producer Burt Lancaster and his agent, business partner, and co-producer Harold Hecht, in mid-1947. The film was the first project for Hecht and Lancaster's new film production companies, Norma Productions and Harold Hecht Productions (financed and distributed by Universal-International Pictures), and hit the screens in October 1948. The film starred Joan Fontaine, Burt Lancaster, and Robert Newton and was released in some markets under the titles The Unafraid or Blood on My Hands, due to objections from fundamentalist groups. A radio adaption was also made for the American Columbia Broadcast System program Lux Radio Theater, which was broadcast under the title The Unafraid in February 1949. Fontaine and Lancaster reprised their roles from the film version, while Jay Novello, who had a smaller part in the film, played Newton's role.

Kiss the Blood Off My Hands' screen rights were, however, challenged by lawyer-turned-agent-turned-producer Charles K. Feldman's film production company, Charles K. Feldman Group Productions, which filed a $1,000,000 damage lawsuit on 1 March 1948 (two weeks before Hecht and Lancaster's film was scheduled to start shooting). Feldman claimed that his film production company owned the screen rights to Butler's novel and demanded Lancaster and Hecht's production be shut down. He also claimed to have purchased the novel's rights from Eagle-Lion Productions, whereas, in defense, Hecht and Lancaster claimed to have procured the rights directly from Butler (through literary agency Curtis Brown Limited). The suit named ten defendants and companies associated with the production of the film, including Butler himself, along with Universal-International Pictures, Norma Productions, Eagle-Lion Productions, Phil Berg-Bert Allenberg (Berg was Joan Fontaine's agent, who had little to do with the film but was reputable enough to attract more attention to the suit), Harold Hecht, Burt Lancaster, Joan Fontaine, Richard Vernon (co-producer with Hecht and Lancaster on the film), and Allan Collins (president of Curtis Brown Limited's American division). The lawsuit was eventually sustained in favor of the defendants by Judge Stanley Barnes at the Los Angeles Superior Court on 6 July 1948, long after filming had wrapped up.

Meanwhile, producer/director Mario Zampi approached Butler in 1947 to collaborate on a film noir thriller, The Fatal Night, through his film production company Anglofilm (with financing and distribution through General Film Distributors). Butler adapted Michael Arlen's famous short story, The Gentleman from America into a screenplay for the film which was released in April 1948. Butler and Zampi immediately collaborated again for another Anglofilm production, Third Time Lucky; Butler's screen adaptation of his own novel They Cracked Her Glass Slipper. Butler also wrote the lyrics to the film's theme song, "Forgive Me for Dreaming". The film which starred Glynis Johns, Dermot Walsh, and Charles Goldner was directed by Gordon Parry and released in January 1949, distributed through Columbia Pictures (which also financed the production).

In October and November 1949, Butler and his wife traveled to Hollywood to negotiate the screen rights to his fourth novel, Mad with Much Heart. The rights were scooped up by Howard Hughes via RKO Radio Pictures, who had given actor Robert Ryan the freedom to choose any story as his next starring vehicle; he picked Mad with Much Heart. Hughes assigned John Houseman as producer and Nicholas Ray as director for a film version originally titled Dark Highway. The settings of the film were changed from England to Boston and the Berkshires in New England. Hughes originally wanted Jennifer Jones as the blind girl in the film, but Ida Lupino was eventually signed (she allegedly was also an uncredited director on the film). Although scheduled to start filming in January 1950, the production stalled for two months and once completed, the film remained unreleased for a year and a half. The picture was retitled On Dangerous Ground and eventually released in December 1951.

Butler's sixth novel, Choice of Two Women (released in the United States under the alternative title Blow Hot, Blow Cold) was published in September 1951 in the United Kingdom and July 1951 in the United States (Butler's only novel to receive publication in America ahead of its British print). He withdrew from the writing industry for nearly twenty years due to not having enough time once he became an executive at Pritchard, Wood and Partners Limited.

In 1971, he began writing his seventh novel, There Is a Death, Elizabeth, which was published by Robert Hale and Company in 1972. He completed another novel in 1972, but it was never published. He died sixteen years later on 1 February 1988.

== Personal life ==
Butler married his secretary, Beryl Bradley, on 27 June 1936, at Church of Saint Mary the Virgin in Cottingham, East Riding of Yorkshire. They lived in the Ryecroft district. The Butlers had one daughter, and made their home in Ockley, Surrey, and later in a house named The Old Bakehouse in Turville. Once Butler started writing novels, his wife became his typist.

== Bibliography ==
- Kiss the Blood Off My Hands (1940)
- They Cracked Her Glass Slipper (1941)
- Their Rainbow Had Black Edges (1943)
- Mad with Much Heart (1945)
- Slippery Hitch (1948)
- Choice of Two Women (1951)
- There Is a Death, Elizabeth (1972)

== Filmography ==
Title	Year	Credited as	
Title	Year	Original Story	Screenwriter
The Fatal Night	1948		Yes
Kiss the Blood Off My Hands	1948	Yes	
Third Time Lucky	1949	Yes	Yes
On Dangerous Ground	1951	Yes	
