= Mad with Much Heart =

1945 novel by Gerald Butler

- Cover artwork of Jarrolds Publishing's 1945 first hardcover edition.
- Author: Gerald Butler
- Language: English
- Genre: Crime thriller
- Set in: England
- Publisher: Jarrolds
- Publication date: 28 June 1945
- Publication place: United Kingdom
- Media type: Print
- OCLC: 1131515903

Mad with Much Heart is a 1945 crime thriller novel by English writer Gerald Butler. It was his fourth novel, and second most popular, after Kiss the Blood Off My Hands (1940). The book is written in the noir style popular at the time. The first British hardcover edition was published by Jarrolds Publishing on 28 June 1945. The American hardcover edition was published by Rinehart & Company on 22 August 1946.

== Film adaptation ==
In 1950 (released 1951) it was adapted into a film version On Dangerous Ground released by Hollywood studio RKO Radio Pictures. Directed by Nicholas Ray it starred Ida Lupino, Robert Ryan and Ward Bond. The adaptation shifted the setting from England to America.

== Publication history ==
- 28 June 1945 Jarrolds Publishing, UK, first hardcover edition
- 1945 The Anchor Press, UK, paperback edition
- 22 August 1946 Rinehart & Company, US, hardcover edition
- 1947 Éditions Universitaires, France, hardcover edition under the title Le cœur et l'esprit, translated by Henri Richard (part of the Univers series, catalog 14)
- May 1952 Lion Books, US, paperback edition under the title The Lurking Man (Mad With Much Heart) (catalog 81)
- 1957 Albatross Books, Germany, paperback edition
- 1959 Werner Söderström Osakeyhtiö, Finland, hardcover edition under the title Yöstä aamun kynnykselle, translated by Eero Ahmavaara
