= Their Rainbow Had Black Edges =

1943 novel by Gerald Butler

- Cover artwork of Jarrolds Publishing's 1943 first hardcover edition.
- Author: Gerald Butler
- Language: English
- Genre: Crime, thriller
- Set in: England
- Publisher: Jarrolds
- Publication date: July 1943
- Publication place: United Kingdom
- Media type: Print
- OCLC: 12643003

Their Rainbow Had Black Edges is a 1943 crime thriller novel by English writer Gerald Butler. It is his third novel and is written in the noir style popular at the time.

The first British hardcover edition was published by Jarrolds Publishing in July 1943. This was Butler's first novel to be published outside of England, with American publishers Farrar & Rinehart signing him to a multi-book contract. Their Rainbow Had Black Edges was published in the United States under the alternative title Dark Rainbow on 8 November 1945.

== Synopsis ==
Their Rainbow Had Black Edges is the story of a soldier who never saw the war. The world would call Ranny weak-minded; the only thing in him that had any lasting strength was his love for Elizabeth. Across the pages of this book crawls boredom, maddening boredom, and the yearnings for a woman's arms. Then in breathless sequence come desertion, discovery, arrest. But on the long, dragging journey back, the fires burn again inside him, and he risks a desperate break away from his armed escort. Finally the woman who loves and hides him is faced with a choice that she hardly dares to make.

== Critical reception ==
Writing for The Lewiston Daily Sun, R.W.L. noted: "Men, especially, will like Gerald Butler's first novel to be introduced outside his native England. "Dark Rainbow," is a bitter and powerful tale, but service-men will understand it, and the author has made no attempt to spare the reader the disastrous effect of likable, patriotic young Rannington's long confinement in various army camps. Gripping, well-written, this story shows vividly the futility of war.

For The New York Times, A.B. was less flattering: "It is all too unbelievably and protractedly coy. The unhappy ending is as superficial as all that went before. IT is hard to accept the notion that this is a superior enough example of current English writing to have been worth importing."

The New Yorker was more flattering, "Since the deserter's motivation is seldom clear enough, the tragedy which ensues does not quote come off. Nevertheless, the chase over the now familiar English countryside and in blacked-out railway compartments is a professional piece of work, and the author's friendly attitude toward his caddish hero may be the start of a postwar trend."

== Publication history ==
- July 1943 Jarrolds Publishing, UK, first hardcover edition
- 1945 Jarrolds Publishing, UK, hardcover edition (re-print)
- 8 November 1945 Farrar & Rinehart, US, hardcover edition under the title Dark Rainbow
