= Third Time Lucky (1949 film) =

- Belgian poster
- Directed by: Gordon Parry
- Written by: Gerald Butler
- Based on: They Cracked Her Glass Slipper by Gerald Butler
- Produced by: Mario Zampi
- Starring: Glynis Johns; Dermot Walsh; Charles Goldner
- Cinematography: Peter Newbrook; Cedric Williams
- Edited by: Giulio Zampi
- Music by: Stanley Black
- Production company: Mario Zampi Productions (as Anglofilm)
- Distributed by: General Film Distributors (UK)
- Release date: January 1949
- Running time: 90 minutes
- Country: United Kingdom
- Language: English

Third Time Lucky (also known as They Cracked Her Glass Slipper) is a 1949 British crime drama film directed by Gordon Parry and starring Glynis Johns, Dermot Walsh and Charles Goldner; Michael Hordern appears in a small uncredited role. The film was produced by Mario Zampi and released by General Film Distributors. It was written by Gerald Butler based on his 1941 novel They Cracked Her Glass Slipper.

== Premise ==
A compulsive gambler falls in love with a woman, and believes she is bringing him luck. Unfortunately, she catches the eye of one of his gambling rivals who has set out to ruin him.

== Cast ==
- Glynis Johns as Joan Burns
- Dermot Walsh as Lucky
- Charles Goldner as Flash Charles
- Harcourt Williams as Doc
- Yvonne Owen as Peggy
- Helen Haye as old lady
- John Stuart as Inspector
- Harold Berens as young waiter
- Ballard Berkeley as Bertram
- Sebastian Cabot as Benny Bennett
- Bruce Walker as Jimmy
- Marianne Deeming as Madame Therese
- Millicent Wolf as Matron
- Jean Short as nurse
- Michael Hordern as 2nd doctor (uncredited)
- Edna Kaye as girl crooner
- Jack Tottenham as chief croupier
- Tom Block as dice croupier

== Production ==
It was shot at Twickenham and Southall Studios in West London.

== Critical reception ==
The Monthly Film Bulletin wrote: "The story is novelletish, and the characters are completely artificial. Glynis Johns, as Joan, wears a look of blank astonishment throughout and Dermot Walsh makes the most of the unrewarding part of Lucky, but Harcourt Williams acts everyone off the screen as the drunken old doctor."

Kine Weekly wrote: "Glynis Johns 'never suggests as Joan, the type of girl who would follow a gambler round London's shady night spots and Dermot Walsh, as Lucky, looks even less like a tough punter. Charles Goldner is not much better as Flash, and Harold ('wot a geezer') Berens completely misfires as Cockney-Italian waiter."

Picture Show wrote: "Unconvincing melodrama, set in an unconvincing underworld."

TV Guide gave the film two out of four stars, and called it an "average British programmer".

In The Radio Times Guide to Films David Parkinson gave the film 2/5 stars, writing: "Dermot Walsh and Glynis Johns just don't set the screen alight and similarly Gordon Parry (in fairness, directing only his second feature) fails to capture the seedy world of gambling dens and backstreet drinking joints. The ending is corny and moralising."
