= Slippery Hitch =

1948 novel by Gerald Butler

- Cover artwork of Jarrolds Publishing's 1948 British hardcover edition.
- Author: Gerald Butler
- Language: English
- Genre: Crime, thriller
- Set in: London
- Publisher: Jarrolds
- Publication date: 27 May 1948
- Publication place: United Kingdom
- Media type: Print
- OCLC: 10534256

Cover artwork of Dell Publishing's 1951 American paperback edition.

Slippery Hitch is a 1946-written but 1948-published crime thriller novel by English writer Gerald Butler. Published by Jarrolds Publishing on 27 May 1948, it was Butler's fifth novel and is written in the noirish hardboiled style of the era. American editions were published by Rinehart & Company (hardcover, 1949) and Dell Publishing (paperback, 1951).

Due to the success of his earlier novels, the film rights were optioned by Hollywood film production company Warner Brothers Pictures in December 1946, before the novel was published, though no film was ultimately produced.

== Publication history ==
- 27 May 1948 Jarrolds Publishing, UK, hardcover edition
- 12 April 1949 Rinehart & Company, US, hardcover edition
- 1951 Dell Publishing, US, paperback edition (catalog Dell 511)
