= Happy Ever After (1954 film) =

1954 British film by Mario Zampi

- Australian film poster
- Directed by: Mario Zampi
- Written by: Jack Davies; Michael Pertwee; L. A. G. Strong
- Produced by: Mario Zampi
- Starring: David Niven; Yvonne De Carlo; Barry Fitzgerald
- Cinematography: Stanley Pavey
- Edited by: Kathleen Connors
- Music by: Stanley Black
- Color process: Technicolor
- Production companies: Associated British Picture Corporation; Anglofilm
- Distributed by: Associated British-Pathé
- Release date: 29 June 1954 (London)
- Running time: 88 minutes
- Country: United Kingdom
- Language: English
- Box office: £255,863 (UK)

Happy Ever after (U.S.,Tonight's the Night) is a 1954 British comedy film directed by Mario Zampi and starring David Niven, Yvonne De Carlo, Barry Fitzgerald and George Cole. It was written by Jack Davies, Michael Pertwee and L. A. G. Strong and concerns the accidental death of an Irish landowner who bequeaths his estate to his cousin.

== Plot ==
Aged General O'Leary is fatally injured while trying to jump a wall with his horse. On his deathbed, the beloved old Irishman bequeaths £1,000 each to his faithful longtime servant Thady O'Heggarty, his neighbor and fellow landowner Major Monty McGluskey for care and feeding of the General's horse and dog, and to Doctor Michael Flynn for keeping him alive longer than he probably would have lived otherwise. The General also cancels all debts owed to him. The rest of the estate goes to a distant relative, Jasper O'Leary, who has never before set foot in the hamlet of Rathbarney.

Jasper very quickly wears out his warm welcome, proving to be an unscrupulous cad who had been saved from marrying a rich but unattractive woman in Capri by his unexpected windfall. He is attracted to Serena McGluskey, a beautiful young widow who has just returned to Rathbarney following the death of her husband. Jasper confides his plan to Serena, "Once I squeeze the lemon dry, I'm off."

Jasper is so unpopular that some of the disgruntled locals gather in Dooley's pub and decide to participate in a secret lottery to see who will be assigned the task of murdering him. Dooley's assistant, Terence, faints when he is chosen. Lacking confidence in his ability, several groups (without each other's knowledge), decide to do the job themselves. However, working at cross purposes and sometimes just by being unlucky, none of them succeed.

Meanwhile, Doctor Flynn is still infatuated with Serena, despite having been jilted by her in the past. He is too blind to see that her sister Kathy is in love with him. Serena's interest in Jasper (and vice versa) eventually cures him. When Serena constantly turns down Jasper's repeated proposals of a dalliance, he asks her to marry him. She agrees.

Finally, on the night when supposedly the ghost of one of Jasper's ancestors walks the halls, all of the various plotters make another try, but once again interfere with each other. Jasper also takes the opportunity to try to burn down the ancestral mansion for the insurance. None succeed. Then, Father Cormac shows up and makes an announcement. General O'Leary had instructed him to open a letter on that day. The letter contains a new will, which is to go into effect if Jasper proved to be unworthy, leaving the estate to Major McGluskey. Jasper offers to depart if the others will hold off on their murderous attempts. To his surprise and delight, Serena asks to go with him.

== Cast ==
- David Niven as Jasper O'Leary
- Yvonne De Carlo as Serena McGluskey
- Barry Fitzgerald as Thady O'Heggarty
- George Cole as Terence
- A. E. Matthews as General O'Leary
- Noelle Middleton as Kathy McGluskey
- Robert Urquhart as Doctor Michael Flynn
- Michael Shepley as Major McGluskey
- Joseph Tomelty as Dooley
- Eddie Byrne as Lannigan
- Liam Redmond as Regan
- Jimmy Mageean as Divarsion
- Patrick McAlinney as O'Connor
- Brian O'Higgins as Milligan
- Patrick Westwood as Murphy
- Fred Johnson as Father Cormac
- Ronan O'Casey as reporter
- Michael Martin Harvey as villager
- Denis Martin as singer
- Bill Shine as Saxby
- Anthony Nicholls as solicitor
- Harry Hutchinson as old porter
- Tommy Duggan as toastmaster
- Valerie French as girl at hunt ball

== Production ==
The film was originally known as O'Leary Night. It was shot at the Elstree Studios of Associated British with sets designed by art director Ivan King. Forty Hall near Enfield doubled for the ancestral Irish home of the O'Learys. Location shooting also took place in Braughing in Hertfordshire, where the railway station was renamed Rathbarney for the duration of the filming.

De Carlo said: "I think it will help me in comedy when it is released in this country. I have had my share of sirens and am happy to get away from them no matter what the part."

== Release ==
It was released in the United States in December 1954 by Allied Artists.

== Reception ==
=== Box office ===
The film was a success at the British box office and is among most successful productions made by Associated British.

According to Kine Weekly the film was a "money maker" at the British box office in 1954.

=== Critical ===
The Monthly Film Bulletin wrote: "Setting aside the phoney emerald islery, the "My Heart is Irish" song scena, and the convention of hilarious, muddleheaded Irish, the fun is mainly fast and genuine. ... The writing is engaging without being particularly clever, and is not above getting a laugh by dropping George Cole's trousers. It could, in any case, have been much worse, and still successful, with such a powerful cast of interpreters, all especially apt at this sort of character comedy – Barry Fitzgerald (dancing askew through the village street in wild rapture at his own genius), A. E. Matthews, the entranced George Cole, Michael Shepley and Joseph Tomelty. The straight parts are quite overshadowed; but it is to David Niven's credit that he remains to the last thoroughly dislikeable."

Kine Weekly wrote: "The picture, unlike most regional comedies, retains its flavour without being too parochial. David Niven revels in the unsympathetic part of villain Jasper, Yvonne de Carlo and Noelle Middleton add a happy touch of romance as Serena and Kathy, Michael Shepley has the time of his life as the blustering McGlusky, and A. E. Matthews and George Cole contribute marvellous cameos as the old General and Terry, respectively. The remainder of the cast is no less keen and resourceful and helps to maintain a cracking pace."

Variety wrote: "This hilarious Irish comedy starts off with the advantage of having three Hollywood names bolster a thin story. It is dependent for most of its laughs on situations. In addition, there is magnificent background scenery and plenty of local color to provide all associated with the brogue and the blarney. It is a natural b.o winner here and its nationalistic appeal should find real response in the U. S."
