= Top Secret (1952 film) =

British comedy by Mario Zampi

- Directed by: Mario Zampi
- Written by: Jack Davies; Michael Pertwee
- Story by: Jack Davies; Michael Pertwee
- Produced by: Mario Zampi
- Starring: George Cole; Oskar Homolka; Nadia Gray
- Cinematography: Stanley Pavey
- Edited by: Giulio Zampi
- Music by: Stanley Black
- Production companies: Associated British Picture Corporation; Transocean Productions
- Distributed by: Associated British-Pathé
- Release date: 19 November 1952 (London)
- Running time: 93 minutes
- Country: United Kingdom
- Language: English
- Box office: £133,313 (UK)

Top Secret (U.S. title: Mr. Potts Goes to Moscow ; also known as Laughter behind the Curtain) is a 1952 British black and white comedy film directed by Mario Zampi and starring George Cole, Oskar Homolka and Nadia Gray. It was written by Jack Davies and Michael Pertwee. A sanitation inspector is mistaken for an international spy.

== Plot ==
George Potts, a plumber in a top secret government research plant, accidentally comes into possession of the plans for a revolutionary atomic weapon. As George leaves for his annual holiday, the research security team embarks on a nationwide search for the hapless 'sanitary engineer'. Meanwhile, the Russians get wind of the incident and intercept George, plying him with liquor and employment promises so that he'll hand over the plans to them. All the while, George never knows what the fuss is about: he thinks that the British and Soviet authorities are interested in his new plans for a modern ballcock system he is carrying. The Russians offer him a job in the Kremlin doing research (on plumbing, he believes), and steal his ballcock plans.

They put George in prison and interrogate him, using a truth drug, but although he tells them truthfully that he hid the plans in the lining of Tania's coat, they have disappeared, because they are in Zekov's coat lining.

While there he falls in love with secret agent Tania, and discovers the true nature of the plans he is carrying.

George organises a flight to East Berlin where Zekov is waiting, unaware that he is carrying the plans.

== Cast ==
- George Cole as George Potts
- Oskar Homolka as Zekov
- Nadia Gray as Tania Ivanova
- Frederick Valk as Rakov
- Wilfrid Hyde-White as Sir Hubert Wells
- Geoffrey Sumner as Pike
- Ronald Adam as Barworth controller
- Ernest Jay as Prof. Layton
- Edwin Styles as Barworth superintendent
- Richard Wattis as Barnes
- Michael Medwin as Smedley
- Eleanor Summerfield as Cecilia
- Irene Handl as Mrs. Tidmarsh
- Phyllis Morris as Mrs. Tweedy
- Charles Goldner as Gaston
- Ina De La Haye as Madame
- Ronnie Stevens as Aubrey
- Olaf Pooley as Professor Roblettski
- Kynaston Reeves as Barworth director
- Frederick Leister as Prime Minister
- Henry Hewitt as Minister of Health
- Gibb McLaughlin as schoolmaster
- Michael Balfour as Jersey sailor
- Walter Horsbrugh as 1st Cabinet Minister
- Anthony Shaw as 2nd Cabinet Minister
- Tim Turner as 1st reporter
- Hal Osmond as Jersey Waiter
- Myrtle Reed as Jersey air hostess
- David Hurst as Deutsch
- Bernard Rebel as Trubiev
- Guido Lorraine as 1st M.V.D.
- Terence Alexander as 2nd M.V.D.
- Richard Marner as Russian sentry
- Martin Boddey as Russian security officer
- Gerard Heinz as Russian director of plant
- Fred Berger as Russian doctor
- Victor Maddern as British N.C.O.
- Reed De Rouen as 1st U.S. soldier
- Johnny Catcher as 2nd U.S. soldier
- Willoughby Gray as British officer
- Christopher Lee as Russian agent
- Stanislaus Zienciakiewicz as Joseph Stalin
- Anton Diffring as East German policeman

== Production ==
The film was shot at the Elstree Studios of Associated British. The film's sets were designed by the art director Ivan King.

== Critical reception ==
The Monthly Film Bulletin wrote: "This heavily facetious little comedy is almost too silly to take seriously; yet one wonders if any good purpose is served by a series of schoolboy jokes directed against the U.S.S.R. There is, in the basic idea (leaving out all the inevitable double-entendres about plumbing and sanitation), perhaps material for a good satire on the level of Ninotchka. But writers and directors offer instead only some old-fashioned farcical situations and childish gibes not based at all on adult political observation. ... As one might expect from the authors of Laughter in Paradise, characterisation and incident stem from the hoariest traditions of British farce, and the technique of the film is theatrical. For a simple entertainment picture there is no great objection to this, but in Top Secret, whether they like it or not, the underlying attitude of the makers places it in the 'cold war' category."

The New York Times noted, "as long as the action stays this side of the Iron Curtain, the production is enjoyable – and understandable – but once entangled with the enigma of Communist rule, the farce ends."

Variety wrote: "Cole, rapidly being typecast for dumb comedy parts, has a made-to-order role. He extracts every bit of humor out of his lines to best advantage. Oscar Homolka fits naturally into the role of the Russian envoy who talks the Englishman into going to Moscow and who is eventually happy to join him on British territory. Nadia Gray is an attractive interpreter who apparently is also relieved to take refuge on British soil. While these three have the plum roles, lesser parts have been filled with thought. Frederick Valk, Geoffrey Sumner and Wilfrid Hyde-White make standout contributions. Stanley Pavey has done a smooth lensing job. Giulio Zampi has edited in slick style."

In British Sound Films: The Studio Years 1928–1959 David Quinlan rated the film as "good", writing: "Broad satire with some outstandingly funny moments."

Leslie Halliwell said: "Farcical satire full of chases and lavatory humour; much of it comes off nicely."

Allmovie wrote, "no one takes Top Secret seriously – certainly not Oscar Homolka, who delivers a bravura performance as a Russian secret agent who wistfully yearns for the glories of the Czarist days."
