= Kiss the Blood Off My Hands (novel) =

1940 novel by Gerald Butler

- Cover artwork of the first American hardcover edition by Farrar & Rinehart, 1946.
- Author: Gerald Butler
- Language: English
- Genre: Crime, thriller
- Set in: London
- Publisher: Nicholson and Watson, Jarrolds; Farrar & Rinehart; Presses de la Cité; Dell Publishing; Carroll & Graf
- Publication date: April 1940
- Publication place: United Kingdom
- Media type: Print
- OCLC: 1705179

Kiss the Blood Off My Hands is a 1940 crime thriller novel by English writer Gerald Butler. It was his first novel, originally published by Nicholson and Watson in April 1940. It quickly became a best-seller and the author was signed to a multi-book deal with Jarrolds Publishing. By 1945, the novel had sold over 232,000 copies in England alone (all during war-time). It received numerous American editions by such publishers as Farrar & Rinehart, Dell Publishing, and Carroll & Graf Publishers. The book was also translated into several languages, including French and Swedish. By 1960, it had sold in excess of 750,000 copies across seven countries.

The narrative established Butler's distinctive hardboiled style, which led to comparisons with American writer James M. Cain. Butler's characters were also described by book critics as amoral and tougher than those introduced by Dashiell Hammett and Raymond Chandler a decade earlier.

The popularity of the novel led to its screen options getting purchased by numerous film production companies, including Eagle-Lion Films, Charles K. Feldman Group Productions, Norma Productions, Harold Hecht Productions, and Universal-International Pictures. A film was successfully made starring Joan Fontaine, Burt Lancaster, and Robert Newton, and directed by Norman Foster in 1948. A radio adaptation was broadcast in 1949 on the CBS series Lux Radio Theatre.

== Synopsis ==
Bill Saunders' past experiences as a prisoner of war have left him unstable and violent. While living in London, he gets into a pub fight and kills a man before fleeing. He hides out with the assistance of a nurse, Jane Wharton, who believes his story that the killing was an accident. Saunders is involved in another fight—this time with a police officer. He ends up behind bars, but Wharton, who is now in love with Saunders, gets him a job driving a truck delivering drugs for her medical clinic when he's released.

Meanwhile, hoodlum Harry Carter, who witnessed the earlier bar fight, threatens to expose Saunders to the police. In return for his silence, Carter demands that Saunders cooperate with a planned robbery of his next drug delivery. When Saunders does the run, Wharton rides with him, forcing Saunders to make the delivery to avoid getting his girlfriend involved in the possibly dangerous theft. This betrayal of Carter puts the lives of Saunders and Wharton in even greater danger.

== Background ==
Butler worked as a chemist early in his career, before becoming a writer for the advertising and public relations firm Pritchard, Wood and Partners Limited, based on Savile Row, London, eventually becoming its director. He was 33 years old when his first novel, Kiss the Blood Off My Hands, was published by Nicholson & Watson in April 1940. The novel was written as a distraction while staying in air-raid shelters while the Germans bombed London during World War II.

Kiss the Blood Off My Hands was accepted by the first publisher Butler contacted, Nicholson & Watson (whose building was ironically destroyed by a German bombing shortly after publication), and became a best-seller, leading to a publishing contract with Jarrolds Publishing and a reprint of the book. By 1945, the novel had sold over 232,000 copies in England alone (all during war-time). The Digit Books re-print of Butler's sixth novel, Choice of Two Women, published in 1960, stated that Kiss the Blood Off My Hands had sold in excess of 750,000 copies.

== Film and radio adaptations ==
In early 1947, Eagle-Lion Films bought the film rights to Kiss the Blood Off My Hands, hoping to shoot it with Robert Donat in the lead. After the option expired, the novel's film rights were sold in mid-1947 to actor-turned-producer Burt Lancaster and his business partner, producer Harold Hecht. The film was the first project for Lancaster's new film production company, Norma Productions (financed by Universal-International), and hit the screens in October 1948. The film starred Joan Fontaine, Burt Lancaster, and Robert Newton and was released in some markets under the titles The Unafraid or Blood on My Hands, due to fundamentalist groups.

A radio adaption was also made for the American Columbia Broadcast System program Lux Radio Theater, which was broadcast under the title The Unafraid on 21 February 1949. Fontaine and Lancaster reprised their roles from the film version, while Jay Novello, who had a smaller part in the film, played Newton's role.

== Publication history ==
- April 1940 Nicholson and Watson, UK, first hardcover edition
- 1941 Jarrolds Publishing, UK, hardcover edition
- 1945 Jarrolds Publishing, UK, hardcover edition (re-print)
- 7 March 1946 Farrar & Rinehart, US, hardcover edition
- 1946 Presses de la Cité, France, hardcover edition under the title Les mains pures, translated in French by Jeanne Fournier-Pargoire (part of the Cosmopolis series)
- 1946 Dell Publishing, US, paperback edition (part of the A Dell Mystery series, catalog Dell 197)
- 1947 Ljus, Sweden, hardcover edition under the title Två mina händer rena, translated by Vanja Lantz
- December 1948 Dell Publishing, US, mapback paperback edition under the title The Unafraid [Kiss the Blood Off My Hands] (part of the Dell Mapback series, catalog Dell 242)
- 1950 Presses de la Cité, France, paperback edition under the title Du sang sur tes mains, translated in French by Jean Weil (part of the Un mystère series, catalog 4)
- 1961 Consul Books / World Distributors, UK, paperback edition
- 1980 Presses de la Cité, France, paperback edition under the title Du sang sur tes mains, translated in French by Jean Weil (part of the Classiques du roman policier series, catalog 16)
- 1987 Carroll & Graf Publishers, US, paperback edition
- 1997 Éditions Omnibus, France, paperback edition under the title Du sang sur tes mains, translated in French by Jean Weil (included in the anthology book Polars années cinquante - Tome 3)
