= The Master of Ballantrae (1953 film) =

1953 British film by William Keighley

- Theatrical release poster
- Directed by: William Keighley
- Written by: Herb Meadow; Harold Medford (add. dialogue)
- Based on: The Master of Ballantrae; 1889 novel by Robert Louis Stevenson
- Starring: Errol Flynn; Roger Livesey
- Cinematography: Jack Cardiff
- Edited by: Jack Harris
- Music by: William Alwyn
- Distributed by: Warner Bros. Pictures
- Release date: 5 August 1953 (US)
- Running time: 90 minutes
- Country: United Kingdom
- Language: English
- Box office: $2 million (US rentals); 1,814,822 admissions (France)

The Master of Ballantrae is a 1953 British Technicolor swashbuckler adventure film starring Errol Flynn and Roger Livesey. It is a loose and highly truncated adaptation of the Robert Louis Stevenson 1889 novel of the same name. In eighteenth century Scotland, two sons of a laird clash over the family estate and a lady. It was the last film directed by William Keighley.

== Plot ==
At the Durrisdeer estate in Scotland in 1745, Jamie Durie, his younger brother Henry and their father Lord Durrisdeer receive news of the Jacobite rising. Their retainer, MacKellar, recommends that one brother join the uprising while the other remains loyal to King George II, so that whichever side wins, the family's status and estate will be preserved. Both brothers want to go. Jamie insists on tossing a coin for the privilege and wins, despite the opposition of his fiancée, Lady Alison.

The rising is crushed at the Battle of Culloden. Evading British soldiers, Jamie falls in with an Irish adventurer, Colonel Francis Burke. They return secretly to Durrisdeer to obtain money for passage to France.

When Jamie's commoner mistress, Jessie Brown, sees him kissing Lady Alison, she betrays him to the English. Jamie is shot by Major Clarendon and falls into the sea. Henry becomes the heir to the estate on the presumption that Jamie is dead.

Believing his brother betrayed him, a wounded Jamie and Burke take ship with smugglers to the West Indies, where they are betrayed by their captain McCauley and captured by pirates led by French dandy Captain Arnaud.

Jamie goes into partnership with Arnaud. When they reach the port of Tortugas Bay, they see a rich Spanish galleon captured by fellow buccaneer Captain Mendoza. Arnaud agrees to Jamie's proposal that they steal the ship. However, once they have seized the galleon, Arnaud turns on Jamie. Jamie kills Arnaud in a sword duel and takes command. They sail for Scotland.

Jamie returns to the family estate, rich with pirate treasure, to find a celebration in progress for Henry's betrothal to Alison. Unable to contain himself, Jamie confronts his brother, despite the presence of British officers. A fight breaks out, in which Henry tries to aid Jamie. The unequal fight ends with Jamie and Burke condemned to death.

Jessie helps them escape, at the cost of her own life. Henry also assists them. Jamie tells his brother of the location of some treasure which Henry can then use to pay off Jamie's gambling debts. Alison elects to go with Jamie to an uncertain future and she, Burke and Jamie all ride off together.

== Cast ==
- Errol Flynn as Jamie Durie
- Roger Livesey as Colonel Francis Burke
- Anthony Steel as Henry Durie
- Beatrice Campbell as Lady Alison
- Yvonne Furneaux as Jessie Brown
- Felix Aylmer as Lord Durrisdeer
- Mervyn Johns as MacKellar
- Charles Goldner as Captain Mendoza
- Ralph Truman as Major Clarendon
- Francis de Wolff as Matthew Bull, Arnaud's Quarter Master
- Jacques Berthier as Captain Arnaud
- Gillian Lynne as Marianne, a dancer favored by Mendoza

== Production ==
=== Development ===
Walker Whiteside toured the US with a play version of the novel in 1935.

Warner Bros. Pictures purchased the screen rights to the novel in 1950. The novel was in the public domain in the US but still in copyright in certain European countries. The purchase was made with funds "frozen" by the British government i.e. money earned by Warners in Britain which they could not take out of the country.

Warner Bros. announced on 7 September 1950 that they would make the film, with shooting to take place in England. (Warners had just made another sea-faring tale, Captain Horatio Hornblower, in England.) The following year it was announced that Joe Gottesman would be producer and Herb Meadow was doing the adaptation. In 1952 it was announced that Errol Flynn would star and the film would be known as The Sea Rogue. Anthony Steel, who had impressed in some British films, was signed to play his brother; it was his biggest role in a Hollywood financed film to date.

=== Filming ===
The film was shot in Great Britain in 1952 from June 25 through to August, with location work in Cornwall and the Scottish Highlands with the pirate sequences done in Palermo in Sicily. Shooting took place six days a week.

Fencing champion Sgt Robert Anderson from the (British) Royal Marines went on leave to participate in the film.

According to one account, filming went very smoothly, in contrast to many Errol Flynn movies around this time. The star was co-operative and well behaved and enjoyed the experience. However Vernon Sewell who worked on the film said it was a technical disaster, citing prop firearm malfunctions, bad weather, camera malfunctions and technician strikes.

"Playing in that period piece made me realise how that must have been the heyday of great lovers", Flynn said. "In the 18th century men treated their women either as angels or scullery maids. You were either gallantly or roughly romantic, and the women expected it one way or the other."

== Reception ==
=== Critical ===
Variety wrote, "Values of the production are good, and they are unfolded... with the kind of action that usually rates attention from the average filmgoer, even if by-passed by most critics. Character development, in the plotting, is elementary, without much shading, but the movement is brisk and the handling gets the most out of the Herb Meadow script and the competent cast to sharpen the romantic values of the 18th century adventure yarn."

The New York Times called it Flynn's best swashbuckler since The Sea Hawk. "Flynn himself hasn't been served better in years", wrote the Los Angeles Times.

The Washington Post called the film "a chaotic tale deserving of his [Flynn's] undisputed prowess."

Filmink magazine wrote that "the story has no real villain and is robbed of its point."

=== Box office ===
According to Variety the film earned $2 million in rentals in North America by the end of 1953.

It was the last film Flynn made under contract to Warner Bros., ending an association that had lasted for 18 years and 35 films. (Their association ended in March 1954 although Flynn would return to Warners to make Too Much, Too Soon.)
