= On Dangerous Ground =

1951 film by Nicholas Ray

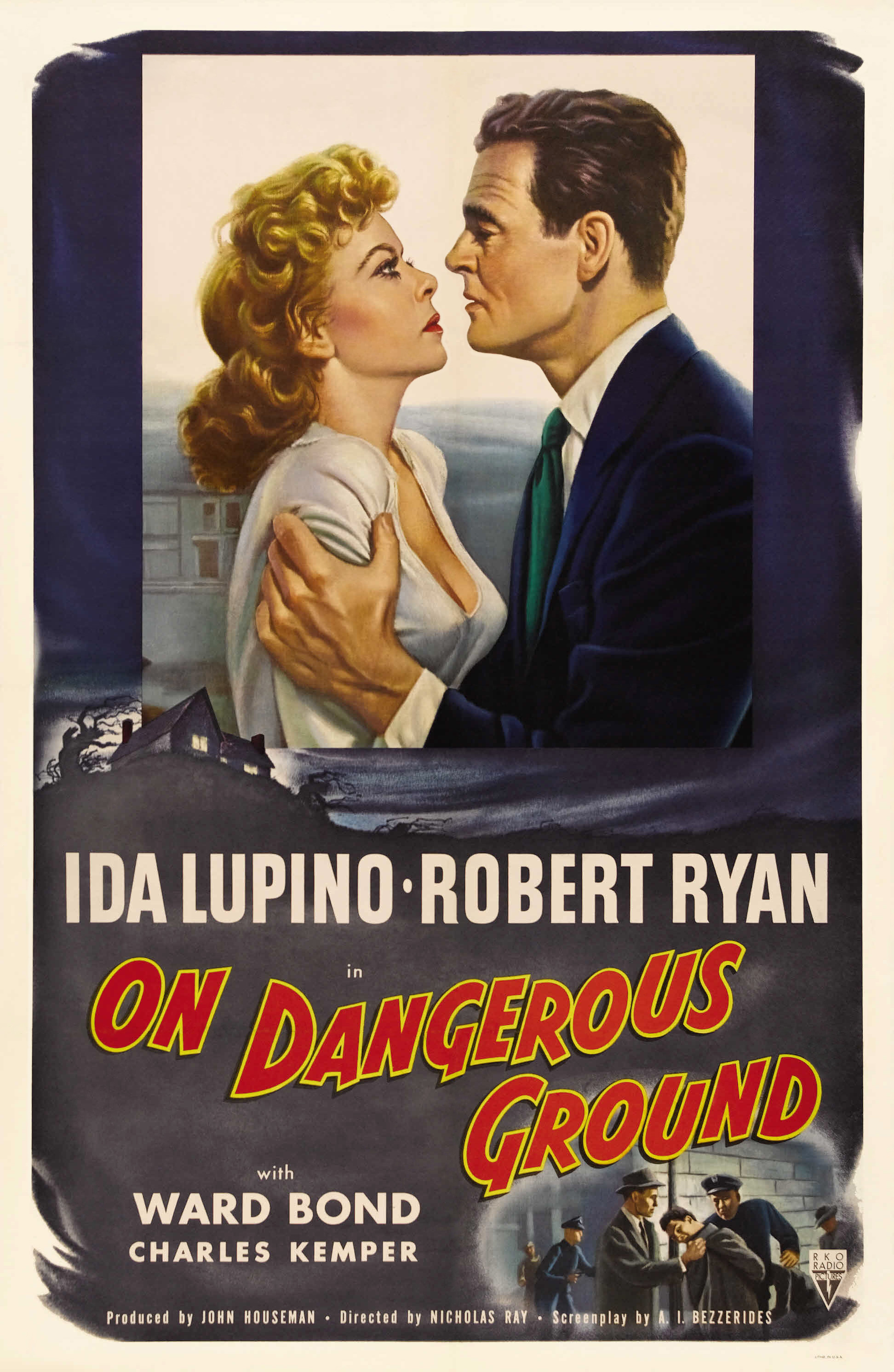
- Theatrical release poster
- Directed by: Nicholas Ray
- Written by: A. I. Bezzerides; Nicholas Ray
- Based on: Mad with Much Heart by Gerald Butler
- Produced by: John Houseman
- Starring: Ida Lupino; Robert Ryan; Ward Bond
- Cinematography: George E. Diskant
- Edited by: Roland Gross
- Music by: Bernard Herrmann
- Distributed by: RKO Pictures
- Release dates: January 17, 1952 (Los Angeles); February 12, 1952 (New York)
- Running time: 82 minutes
- Country: United States
- Language: English

On Dangerous Ground is a 1952 film noir directed by Nicholas Ray, produced by John Houseman, and starring Robert Ryan and Ida Lupino. The screenplay was written by A. I. Bezzerides based on the 1945 novel Mad with Much Heart by Gerald Butler.

== Plot ==
Police detective Jim Wilson is known for employing physical violence to extract information from suspects and witnesses. After Wilson ignores his chief's warnings, he is relegated to a case upstate. He joins a manhunt pursuing the murderer of a young girl and teams with Walter Brent, the father of the victim. After they spot a man and chase him through the snow, Wilson and Brent become separated from the rest of the manhunt.

They track the suspect to a remote house where they find a blind woman, Mary Malden, alone. She tells Wilson and Brent that she lives with her younger brother Danny. Wilson learns that Danny, who is mentally disabled, is the killer and Mary asks Wilson to protect him. Wilson agrees to capture Danny peacefully, and he and Brent spend the night at the house.

At dawn, Mary visits Danny, who is hiding in the storm cellar. She tells him that Wilson is a friend and will take him away to be helped. On her way back to the house, Wilson confronts her and Danny runs out of the cellar.

Wilson trails Danny to a secluded shack. Danny brandishes a knife, but Wilson is patient and they talk. He learns that Mary had foregone eye surgery for Danny's sake. Danny says that he did not mean to hurt the girl, he just wanted to make her smile. Wilson slowly advances, preparing to take the knife from him, but Brent bursts into the room, shotgun raised, and the two men brutally struggle. Brent's gun fires and Danny escapes. Wilson hurls the gun into the snow.

The two men chase Danny up a rugged, snow-covered stone peak. Danny loses his footing and falls to his death. Wilson carries Danny's body to the nearest house. Mary arrives, having heard the gunshot. In the bedroom with her brother's body, she prays that God will grant Danny forgiveness and peace.

Wilson walks with Mary back to her home and asks if she will now have the surgery. She confesses that she is afraid, and Wilson wants to help her but she wants no pity and sends him away. Wilson drives all night to reach the city, pensively remembering the recent events. Later, he returns to the house and reunites with Mary.

== Cast ==
- Ida Lupino as Mary Malden
- Robert Ryan as Jim Wilson
- Ward Bond as Walter Brent
- Charles Kemper as Pop Daley
- Anthony Ross as Pete Santos
- Ed Begley as Capt. Brawley
- Ian Wolfe as Sheriff Carrey
- Sumner Williams as Danny Malden
- Gus Schilling as Lucky
- Frank Ferguson as Willows
- Cleo Moore as Myrna Bowers
- Olive Carey as Mrs. Brent
- Jimmy Conlin as Doc Hyman (uncredited)

== Music ==
The film score was composed by Bernard Herrmann and is strongly evocative of his later, better-known score to Alfred Hitchcock's 1959 thriller North by Northwest. Herrmann later reused a sequence that became the opening theme song of the 1957 television series Have Gun Will Travel.

Herrmann used the six- or seven-stringed viola d'amore, which uses extra strings that vibrate with sympathetic resonance to reinforce played notes, to symbolize Mary Malden's isolation and loneliness. The sound of the instrument can be heard much of the time when she appears on the screen. It was performed by Virginia Majewski, who received a screen credit for her contribution.

== Reception ==
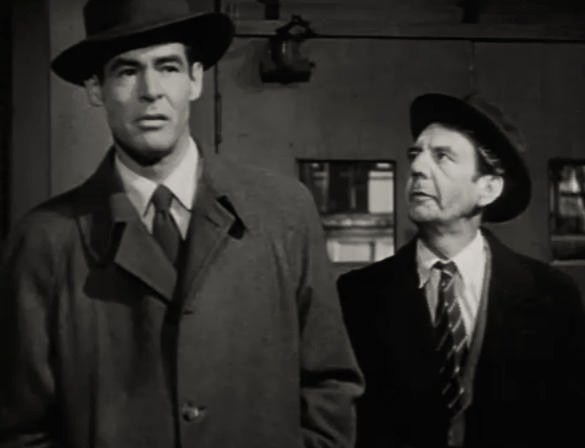
Robert Ryan and Gus Schilling

In a contemporary review for The New York Times, critic Bosley Crowther wrote: "An obvious attempt to get something more than sheer melodrama onto the screen—something pictorially reflective of the emotional confusion of a man—is apparent in John Houseman's hard-grained production, ... With this flimsy material-—and that is the fault of the film—the best has been made by Mr. Houseman and his director, Nicholas Ray. ... But, as we say, the story is a shallow, uneven affair ... The cause of the cop's sadism is only superficially explained, and certainly his happy redemption is easily and romantically achieved. .... For all the sincere and shrewd direction and the striking outdoor photography, this R. K. O. melodrama fails to traverse its chosen ground."

Critic Philip K. Scheuer of the Los Angeles Times wrote: "Ryan's role is, of course, a blood brother to Kirk Douglas in 'Detective Story' but it hasn't the power or development that Douglas' had. You won't find it all too bad—particularly the first half—if you regard it as an action yarn and don't let the 'metaphysical' overtones depress you unduly."
