= The Fatal Night =

1948 film

- Directed by: Mario Zampi
- Written by: Michael Arlen; Gerald Butler; Kathleen Connors
- Produced by: Mario Zampi
- Starring: Lester Ferguson; Jean Short; Leslie Armstrong
- Cinematography: Cedric Williams
- Edited by: Giulio Zampi
- Music by: Stanley Black
- Production companies: Anglo Films; Veneficus Films
- Distributed by: Columbia Pictures
- Release date: 11 July 1948
- Running time: 50 minutes
- Country: United Kingdom
- Language: English
- Budget: $56,000 or £14,000

The Fatal Night is a 1948 British second feature ('B') thriller film directed by Mario Zampi and starring Lester Ferguson, Jean Short and Leslie Armstrong. It was written by Michael Arlen, Gerald Butler and Kathleen Connors based on Arlen's 1925 short story The Gentleman from America, which tells the story of an American visitor in London who makes a bet with two Englishmen to see if he can spend a night alone in a "haunted" room.

The same story, under its original title, was adapted in 1956 as an episode of the television series Alfred Hitchcock Presents.

== Cast ==
- Lester Ferguson as Puce
- Jean Short as Geraldine
- Leslie Armstrong as Cyril
- Brenda Hogan as Julia
- Patrick Macnee as Tony
- Aubrey Mallalieu as Yokel

== Reception ==
Kine Weekly wrote: "Its plot, which hinges on a reckless wager, unfolds in a gloomy old house, and good acting and imaginative direction and camerawork cleverly amplify its grisly highlights and tragic last-minute twists. ... Leslie Ferguson does a very good job as the frightened and victimised Puce, Leslie Armstrong is true to type as the mean and mincing Cyril, and Jean Short and Brenda Hogan are more than adequate as Geraldine and Julia. ... The film, two thrillers in one, is skilfully planned. The creepy flashback of the two sisters fits perfectly into the main narrative and effectively underlines its tragic point."

Picture Show wrote: "Grim pocket thriller ... It is exciting and tense, and its touch of the fantastic adds to its thrills."

Variety wrote: "Story sticks fairly closely to the Arlen original. ... Operatic tenor Lester Ferguson plays the American and warbles "Rigoletto" at the top of his voice in the dead of night when every precaution was taken to enter the house on tiptoe. He keeps repeating 'It's a lot of hooey.' Maybe he's right."
