= My Friend Lester =

- Written by: Alec Coppel
- Original language: English
- Subject: murder
- Genre: comedy-thriller

Premiere
- Date premiered: 14 April 1947

My Friend Lester is a 1947 farce play by Alec Coppel. It debuted at the Embassy Theatre in London on 14 April 1947 and later moved to St Martin's Theatre.

The play seems to have been reworked by Coppel as The Gazebo.

== Plot ==
A playwright, looking for material, invites a harlot to his flat, where she is shot by her protector. The playwright has to dispose of a body.

== Original cast ==
- Richard Bird as Lester Judd, the writer
- Linden Travers as Miriam Hudd
- Charles Goldner as Mick, the pimp
- Sydney King as Chalfont
- Jack Richie as Lynch
- John Sharp as Randall
- Pat Smylie as Toto

== Original reviews ==
The Guardian said the central "situation is perhaps not inherently wretched... but the skill and wit, to say nothing of the good taste which might make the effort worthwhile are not to be found in the material."

The Observer felt that "Alec Coppel is hardly resourceful enough... the farce goes off the boil too soon. But there are passages of fine frenzy and the right comic delirium."

Another writer for the Observer felt the show was "very oddly composed: some of its fun would just suit a schoolboy while the rest of it would set him asking the most awkward questions... It certainly surprised me that the censor should have given his green light to so much that was blue especially in the part of a pimp."
