= Kiss the Blood Off My Hands =

1948 film by Norman Foster

- Theatrical release poster
- Directed by: Norman Foster; Robert Siodmak
- Screenplay by: Leonardo Bercovici (screenplay); Walter Bernstein (adaptation); Ben Maddow (adaptation); Hugh Gray (dialogue); Philip MacDonald (uncredited)
- Based on: Kiss the Blood Off My Hands by Gerald Butler
- Produced by: Harold Hecht; Burt Lancaster; Richard Vernon; Norman Deming
- Starring: Joan Fontaine; Burt Lancaster; Robert Newton
- Cinematography: Russell Metty
- Edited by: Milton Carruth
- Music by: Miklós Rózsa
- Production companies: Norma Productions; Harold Hecht Productions
- Distributed by: Universal-International Pictures
- Release date: October 29, 1948 (United States)
- Running time: 79 minutes
- Country: United States
- Language: English
- Budget: $1 million
- Box office: $1.6 million (US 1948 rentals)

Kiss the Blood Off My Hands is a 1948 American noir-thriller film directed by Norman Foster. Based on the best-selling novel of the same name by Gerald Butler, it stars Joan Fontaine, Burt Lancaster, and Robert Newton. The film faced minor opposition from fundamentalist groups in the United States and the Commonwealth, with regard to its gory title. In some markets, the film was released under the alternate titles The Unafraid (in Canada, Australia, New Zealand, and smaller towns in the United States) or Blood on My Hands (in the United Kingdom).

The film was the first production by Lancaster and his agent Harold Hecht's new film production company, Norma Productions (co-produced through Harold Hecht Productions). Kiss the Blood Off My Hands was financed and distributed through a one-picture deal with Universal-International Pictures, in exchange for Lancaster appearing in the studio's production of All My Sons. The film was set in London, England but was shot almost entirely at Universal-International Pictures' Sound Stage 21 from March to May 1948. Some exterior scenes were shot on location at Los Angeles' Griffith Park Zoo and the Hollywood Park Racetrack.

The movie premiered on Friday, October 29, 1948, at Loew's Criterion Theater in New York City, and opened to over three hundred theaters in the United States starting on October 30 and through November 1948. In promotion of the film, Lancaster embarked on a tour performing a trapeze and acrobatic vaudeville act with his partner Nick Cravat. Some of the pair's stunts would be recreated and filmed for Norma Productions' next picture, the swashbuckler The Flame and the Arrow.

== Plot ==
Bill Saunders is a Canadian former prisoner of war now living in England, whose experiences have left him unstable and violent. He gets into a pub fight in which he kills the publican and then flees. As the police pursue Saunders, he sneaks into the apartment of Jane Wharton, a nurse, while she is sleeping. Wharton allows Saunders to stay overnight. The next morning, Wharton leaves for work, and Saunders returns to his apartment. He then waits outside the hospital to see Wharton again. After Saunders introduces himself, he follows her to a zoo, much to her annoyance. However, the sound of the zoo animals traumatizes Saunders, and they leave together. He gets Wharton to attend a horse race, and with Saunders's confidence, she wins a horse bet.

As Wharton leaves to collect her winnings, Harry Carter, who witnessed the pub fight, approaches Saunders. On the way home, Saunders and Wharton take the express train, where Carter reencounters Saunders and proposes a partnership. Tom Widgery, an Englishman, enters their cart and they play a card game. Saunders later suspects Widgery of cheating and assaults him. Wharton pulls an emergency brake, and they leave the train. Wharton disavows Saunders, and when a policeman arrives, Saunders assaults him.

Saunders is found guilty of robbery and assault, and is given six months of hard labor for each charge. The judge also orders Saunders to be flogged. Saunders completes his sentence, and during a game of pool, Carter proposes they collaborate to steal and transport penicillin supplies. Afterwards, Saunders reconnects with Wharton outside her apartment. Still in love with him, she has Saunders hired as a truck driver. At work, Carter blackmails Saunders so he can commit the robbery.

On the night of the robbery, Wharton decides to ride with him. However, Saunders backs out temporarily so he doesn't implicate her. Sometime later, Carter arrives at Wharton's apartment, where he tells her that Saunders had killed a publican and demands her complicity in the robbery. When Carter forces himself on her, Wharton stabs him with scissors, but he survives. After Saunders arrives, he takes Carter to his apartment, where Carter holds him at gunpoint and threatens to tell the police. Saunders gains the upper hand, and Carter dies.

At the docks, Saunders meets with the boat captain to smuggle the stolen penicillin. Haunted by Carter's words, Wharton leaves her apartment, but Saunders finds her on the street. They discuss whether Saunders had intended to kill the publican and how they will live should they run away. They reaffirm their mutual love and decide to stay in England.

== Cast ==
- Joan Fontaine as Jane Wharton
- Burt Lancaster as William Earle "Bill" Saunders
- Robert Newton as Harry Carter
- Lewis L. Russell as Tom Widgery
- Aminta Dyne as Landlady
- Grizelda Harvey as Mrs. Paton
- Jay Novello as Sea Captain of Pelicano
- Colin Keith-Johnston as Judge
- Reginald Sheffield as Superintendent
- Campbell Copelin as Publican
- Leyland Hodgson as Tipster
- Peter Hobbes as Young Father
- Joseph Granby as uncredited

== Production ==
=== Origin of Norma Productions ===
After serving in World War II, former theatre actor, film choreographer and literary agent Harold Hecht returned to Hollywood with plans to head his own talent agency. In September 1945, he formed the Hecht-Rantz Agency with his friend and former Goldstone Agency employee, Louis Rantz. Rantz had also worked in Hollywood during the mid-1930s, as an associate producer at Metropolitan Pictures, George A. Hirliman Productions and B.F. Zeidman Productions. Hecht and Rantz set up their office at 324 South Beverly Drive in Beverly Hills, California.

During a show-going holiday in New York City in late November 1945, Lillian Schary, Dore Schary's sister, suggested to Hecht that he go see a new Broadway play at the Lyceum Theater. A Sound of Hunting, which had opened off-Broadway a couple of weeks earlier, was showcasing brand new actor Burt Lancaster. Hecht was immediately impressed with Lancaster's performance. He later said of that night "When I saw Burt Lancaster in A Sound of Hunting on Broadway (in 1945), I knew he had it. I don't know how you could miss it. He was so dominating, so much larger than life". Hecht attended the play many more times before it closed after only twenty-three performances on December 8, 1945; it fared better once adapted by Stanley Kramer into the film Eight Iron Men in 1952, with Lee Marvin reprising Lancaster's role.

When nearly all of the major Hollywood studios started coming at Lancaster with contract offers, his friend and A Sound of Hunting co-star Sam Levene, an established stage and film actor, offered to represent him. Together, they were invited to restaurants, hearing offers from independent producer David O. Selznick, head of Selznick International Pictures, 20th Century-Fox Film scouts and Harold B. Wallis' new Paramount Pictures-financed production company, Hal Wallis Productions, which had recently signed such talent as Kirk Douglas, Wendell Corey, Lizabeth Scott, Barbara Stanwyck, Don DeFore, Ann Richards, Kristine Miller, Douglas Dick and Betsy Drake.

Lancaster was then approached by Hecht, who hoped to bring the new unknown star back to Hollywood. When Levene introduced Hecht to Lancaster in their dressing room on the last night of the play, Hecht opted for honesty. He told Lancaster "I know everybody, but I have few clients. If you sign with me, you'd be important to me. I'd work harder for you because I want to eat and I'd have to keep you working". Contrary to popular quotes from the parties, Lancaster signed with Hecht before the mention of producing their own films was even mentioned. Lancaster immediately signed with the Hecht-Rantz Agency in his dressing room and then went out to celebrate at a restaurant. It was once at this restaurant that they talked some more about the film industry and Hecht said "You know, I don't like being an agent. I want to produce pictures". Lancaster replied that he too would like to produce films, which led to Hecht retorting "Maybe in five years we can make it".

Through Hecht's negotiations, Hal B. Wallis' new offer to Lancaster included a seven-year contract (the longest term a studio was legally allowed to keep an actor under contract at the time), with an option for one outside independent picture each year, giving the agent and actor the opportunity to produce a yearly film. However, Wallis' initial contract also forced Lancaster to make two pictures a year for Paramount Pictures, on top of respecting loan-out agreements. Wallis first planned for Lancaster to star in Desert Fury and sent him to Hollywood in early 1946 for a screen test with director Byron Haskin. Before Desert Fury was set to be filmed, between August and September 1946, Lancaster was loaned out to Mark Hellinger's film production company, Mark Hellinger Productions, for the starring role in the film noir The Killers.

A few months later, in April 1946, Hecht and Lancaster were sitting in the bar of the Barbizon-Plaza Hotel in New York City, having a last drink before Lancaster was off to Hollywood for the filming of The Killers. Lancaster was worried about the kind of movies he would be getting in Hollywood, when Hecht jokingly told him "Well Burt, if you don't like what you get into out there, we'll just produce our own films. That's the one way you're sure to get what you want!". Throughout the 1940s, every actor, producer and director hoped to start their own film production company to achieve creative freedom, but few were able to accomplish it due to contractual or financial obligations. The few that did manage to venture into productions of their own, most often did not last long enough to make an impact and rarely produced more than a handful of films. As it turned out, Hecht and Lancaster were able to produce their first film only nineteen months after meeting and remained in partnership for seventeen years, producing twenty-three motion pictures.

The Killers was filmed in the spring of 1946 and was released mere months later, in August 1946, through the newly merged Universal-International Pictures (previously two separate film companies). The film was an immediate box office success and received critical acclaim, making Lancaster an overnight film star with his first movie. Though Desert Fury was next filmed between August and September 1946, the film was kept in Paramount Pictures' backlog for an entire year, until August 1947, as Wallis' other productions rolled out to the public. The same delay occurred with Wallis' next Lancaster projects: Variety Girl was filmed in October—November 1946, but only released in August 1947, and I Walk Alone was filmed from December 1946 to February 1947, but was not released until January 1948. Following the back-to-back filming of those three Wallis productions at Paramount Pictures, Lancaster was again loaned out to Hellinger for another successful film noir, Brute Force. The film was shot from March to April 1947 and released without delay in July of that year though Universal-International Pictures.

As early as April 1947, Lancaster wanted to break his contract with Hal Wallis Productions, but it took six months of negotiations (and star-power appeal) for Wallis to grant better working conditions to the actor. Lancaster's renewed, but improved, seven-year contract with Wallis, signed in early October 1947, resulted with a decrease to one annual Paramount Pictures-distributed Hal Wallis Productions picture, and an increase to two independent production options a year. This allowed Lancaster to deal directly with Mark Hellinger Productions, with which he signed a three-picture contract.

The press was understandably surprised when Lancaster, still considered a new actor with only two released films to his credit (The Killers and Brute Force, as the other three were stuck in Paramount Pictures' backlog), announced that he was starting his own film production company in July 1947. At the time, Hellinger and Lancaster were already discussing their next project together, Criss Cross, which was originally to be financed and distributed through Universal-International Pictures. This later changed when Mark Hellinger Productions signed a six-picture distribution deal with David O. Selznick's Selznick Releasing Organization in October 1947, two months before Hellinger died. Because of the success The Killers and Brute Force had received, Lancaster and Hecht were able to negotiate directly with William Goetz, head of Universal-International Pictures, and the studio offered them a package deal: a one-off $1,000,000 financing offer to produce one of their own films, which Universal-International Pictures would distribute, in exchange for Lancaster starring in the studio's production of All My Sons. Lancaster was only salaried for his acting in All My Sons, performing and producing his own film within the means of the production cost, but Universal-International Pictures' deal with Norma Productions added the bonus of splitting the profits from the picture equally between the two units.

Lancaster's new production company was named Norma Productions and became a registered and incorporated company in July 1947. Lancaster named his company after his second wife, Norma Marie Anderson, whom he had married six months prior, on December 28, 1946. His wife was a strong supporter of his artistic independence, and she was quoted as saying that Lancaster should "make one movie for the bank, one for [his] art". Anderson's profile was used for the company's logo. The new business setup its headquarters in the same office that Hecht rented for his company, Harold Hecht Productions, at 8747 Sunset Boulevard West in Hollywood. But as soon as pre-production started on their first movie, Norma Productions officially listed their address as part of Universal Studio in Universal City. Early legal papers credit Harold Hecht as president of Norma Productions with Burt Lancaster as vice-president, though both were always equal partners, and Jack M. Ostrow as treasurer. Hecht's private typist Cherie Redmond became the company's executive secretary.

=== Development and casting ===
Hecht and Lancaster's first independent film production was revealed to the press simultaneously with the announcement of their new film production company. As co-producer, Lancaster could have picked any type of role to play for his independent debut, but chose to stick to the crime dramas that had made him famous. Kiss the Blood Off My Hands would be a film noir adaptation of the 1940 British best-selling novel by Gerald Butler. The story could have just as easily been chosen by Mark Hellinger Productions. To craft the film, Hecht and Lancaster hired cast and crew that were notable in the crime, mystery and film noir genres. Jules Buck, who had worked as Hellinger's associate producer on The Killers, Brute Force and The Naked City at Universal-International Pictures, signed on with Hecht and Lancaster in the same position. Joining them was Richard Vernon, a British film producer, then living in Hollywood. Vernon acquired the novel's filming rights, on his behalf, through British literary agency Curtis Brown Limited, one of the largest literary agencies of the era (with offices in England and the United States), and in turn sold the rights to Norma Productions, remaining on board as co-producer.

Butler's novel's filming rights had originally been purchased by Eagle-Lion Productions in 1946, with the intention to produce a film starring Robert Donat, as the actor had terminated of his exclusive contract with MGM British. But Eagle-Lion Productions' option had since expired. Only months after the Norma Productions acquisition, Buck left the project and was bought out for $17,500 to cover any claims he might have on the development. He was replaced by associate producer Norman Deming, who had worked on the successful film noir Gilda, starring Glenn Ford. Deming not only helped with the production but was added to the board of directors at Norma Productions after buying an interest in the company. Kiss the Blood Off My Hands was adapted by Walter Bernstein (who was under contract to Hecht) and Ben Maddow (who had worked on another Glenn Ford film noir Framed) with Leonardo Bercovici writing the actual screenplay. Bercovici's most famous work at the time had been the Cary Grant and David Niven comedy film The Bishop's Wife, but his strength lay in crime thrillers and film noirs, having worked on The Lost Moment, Moss Rose, Chasing Danger, Prison Train and Racket Busters. Hugh Gray, whose most recent work at the time was the crime thriller River Gang, acted as technical advisor and helped with additional dialogue and cockney accents.

Kiss the Blood Off My Hands was initially to go into production in September 1947 with director Robert Siodmak at the helm, but it was first pushed back to November 15. Siodmak had already directed Lancaster in The Killers (which earned him an Oscar nomination and an Edgar Allan Poe Award), and was noted in Hollywood for his mastery of crime-melodrama films. He held credits directing other crime, mystery and film noirs as Time Out of Mind, The Dark Mirror, The Spiral Staircase, The Strange Affair of Uncle Harry, The Suspect, Christmas Holiday, Phantom Lady, Son of Dracula, The Night Before the Divorce, Fly-by-Night, Pièges, Autour d'une enquête, Stürme der Leidenschaft and Tumultes, in addition to writing the story that was turned into Conflict. Siodmak was planning to film Kiss the Blood Off My Hands before his next Hellinger-produced picture Cry of the City, the later of which was scheduled to be filmed in late December 1947. But Kiss the Blood Off My Hands' November to December 1947 shooting schedule was pushed back again by a month, and then indefinitely, until a mid-March 1948 date was secured. Universal-International Pictures changed the schedule firstly to allow All My Sons to be filmed first, as an assurance that their end of the bargain would be taken care of, and secondly, to give Lancaster enough time to fulfill Wallis' film obligation at Paramount Studio and Siodmak a chance to wrap up his Hellinger project. All My Sons was filmed from September to December 1947, following which Lancaster switched over to Paramount for Wallis' Sorry, Wrong Number, filmed from January to March 1948. Both of these films would be released in 1948, after the filming of Kiss the Blood Off My Hands.

In January 1948, Norman Foster was announced as Siodmak's replacement to direct the film. Foster was another crew member that flourished in crime and mystery flics. In the late 1930s, he wrote and directed six of the eight Mr. Moto films starring Peter Lorre for Twentieth Century-Fox Films. He also directed three Charlie Chan pictures for the same studio. But his most prestigious screen credit was directing Orson Welles' 1943 film Journey into Fear. In addition to this, he directed four other mystery and crime pictures: Fair Warning, Ride, Kelly, Ride, Scotland Yard and I Cover Chinatown, the last in which he also starred. Foster requested British crime novelist Philip MacDonald be brought in to work on the script, having already worked together on the Mr. Moto series. McDonald had a noteworthy resume of his own with crime and mystery films, which included Love from a Stranger, Dangerous Intruder, The Body Snatcher (which earned him a Hugo Award nomination), Strangers in the Night, Nightmare, Whispering Ghosts, Rebecca, Blind Alley, The Nursemaid Who Disappeared, Who Killed John Savage?, Bride of Frankenstein, Charlie Chan in Paris, Charlie Chan in London, Mystery Woman, Limehouse Blues, Menace, The Mystery of Mr. X, Hotel Splendide and C.O.D.

Lancaster was said to be the only American actor in the film, with an all-British expatriate co-starring, featuring and supporting cast. Hecht went on a casting tour in late January 1948 to find a leading lady, and tested thirty girls for the part. Lila Leeds, a relatively unknown bit-part actress at the time (eight months before her notoriety as Robert Mitchum's "accomplice" in his marijuana wrap on August 31, 1948) was Hecht's top choice before Joan Fontaine, already under contract with Universal-International Pictures, came in on the project.

Fontaine was initially to appear in another picture with Lancaster, Thunder on the Hill. Thunder on the Hill was first announced as a Universal-International Pictures project in August 1947, with plans for Robert Siodmak to direct the Joseph Sistrom production, and starring Lancaster and Fontaine. The production for Thunder on the Hill was postponed to allow Lancaster to film All My Sons and while Fontaine filmed Letter from an Unknown Woman (co-starring Louis Jourdan), the first movie made through her own film production company, Rampart Productions (co-owned with her husband William Dozier). Thunder on the Hill was postponed again, to the autumn of 1948, this time to allow for the filming of Kiss the Blood Off My Hands, which was to be followed by Rampart Productions' second film, You Gotta Stay Happy (co-starring Fontaine and James Stewart). Due to Fontaine's announced pregnancy during the filming of Kiss the Blood Off My Hands, the filming of Thunder on the Hill was again pushed back, this time to January 1949; by then the entire production team and its stars had been replaced.

It was through Thunder on the Hill's connection that Lancaster approached Fontaine to star in Kiss the Blood Off My Hands, a role she was envious to play. Having Fontaine on board was another perk for Norma Productions, as she was considered, like Lancaster, a great box office attraction. She had already won an Oscar for Best Actress in 1942 for her role in Alfred Hitchcock's Suspicion, and had been nominated for two more: once for Rebecca in 1941 (another Hitchcock film) and once more for The Constant Nymph in 1944. She had also recently appeared in the 1947 film noir Ivy, in a role that was initially written for her sister, Olivia de Havilland. Though Fontaine was not born in England, both of her parents had been, and she was able to bring an authenticity to the role. With Fontaine on board, Rampart Productions' production coordinator, John Hambleton, was brought over to work on Norma Productions' debut film.

British character actor Robert Newton, who was visiting America at the time of casting, was quickly hired for his first American film in the role of the blackmailing heavy. Newton, too, had worked with Hitchcock, in Jamaica Inn, and had received praise for his work with Laurence Olivier in Henry V and David Lean's Oliver Twist. But it was his crime, thriller and mystery films which had won him a loyal fanbase, including Carol Reed's Odd Man Out, Temptation Harbour, Snowbound, Night Boat to Dublin, Gaslight, Bulldog Sees It Through, 21 Days and Poison Pen.

Dozens of other British or Commonwealth expatriates were hired for the production; actors that were either visiting America or had moved to act in Hollywood. Such was the case for Grizelda Harvey and Marilyn Williams, two British radio stars who were practically unknown in the United States.

The novel was set in London and Norma Productions intended to keep the setting accurate. They hired two Academy Award-nominated art directors to design the sets: Nathan Juran and Bernard Herzbrun. Juran, who had actually won an Academy Award for Best Art Direction for his work in How Green Was My Valley, had since designed a number of film noir sets for I Wake Up Screaming, Dr. Renault's Secret, The Razor's Edge (which earned him another Oscar nomination) and Body and Soul. Herzbrun had also been nominated for an Oscar for his work in Alexander's Ragtime Band, but was mostly known as a contract art director at Universal-International Pictures, lacking no experience in mystery drama films. He had recently worked on two Lancaster films, Brute Force and All My Sons, and was noted for his work on Rogues' Regiment, Larceny, Abbott and Costello Meet Frankenstein, A Woman's Vengeance, A Double Life, Ride the Pink Horse, Singapore, The Web, Strange Holiday, Temptation, Time Out for Murder and three Mr. Moto pictures with director Foster, one of which, Mysterious Mr. Moto, was based in London but filmed in Hollywood.

Juran and Herzbrun, in turn, hired Russell A. Gausman and Ruby R. Levitt, both contract set decorators at Universal-International Pictures, who had freshly worked on Fontaine's first Rampart Productions film, Letter from an Unknown Woman. Gausman, a long-time collaborator of Herzbrun, had also worked on the Lancaster films Brute Force, The Killers and All My Sons, as well as on Ivy (with Fontaine), The Naked City (with Hellinger), and the film noir Secret Beyond the Door (with Fritz Lang). Levy, on the other hand, was relatively new in his position, but had worked on Letter from an Unknown Woman and on the film noir Smash-Up: The Story of a Woman.

The art directors and set decorators recreated thirty blocks of London's East End waterfront district on Universal-International Pictures' Sound Stage 21. The sets included wharfs, cobblestone streets, old buildings exteriors (including houses, storefronts, corner buildings and a railway station), a court, a pool hall, two apartments, a train with passenger wagons and a prison depicted with multiple rooms and cells, all of which were interchangeable through a monorail crane on rollers. This made up a total of thirty-two different settings and twenty different street combinations. One setting was used to arrange a twenty-nine block chase sequence when Lancaster's character is on the run.

A number of stock crew were hired by Universal-International Pictures, many, like hair stylist Carmen Dirigo, makeup artist Bud Westmore, soundmen Leslie I. Carey and Corson Jowett and special effect photographer David S. Horsley, resumed their positions from their work on All My Sons. Most of the time, these positions went unnoticed and unappreciated, but Norma Productions made a point of thanking them by dividing twenty percent of the film's profits amongst the personnel and sent everyone gift baskets once the production wrapped.

=== Lawsuit ===
On March 1, 1948, two weeks before filming was scheduled to start, lawyer-turned-agent-turned-producer Charles K. Feldman filled a $1,000,000 damage lawsuit against ten people and companies associated with the production of the film: Universal-International Pictures, Norma Productions, Eagle-Lion Productions, Phil Berg-Bert Allenberg (Berg was Fontaine's agent, who had little to do with the film but was reputable enough to attract more attention to the suit), Harold Hecht, Burt Lancaster, Joan Fontaine, Richard Vernon, Gerald Butler and Allan Collins (president of the Curtis Brown Limited's American division). Feldman claimed that his film production company, Charles K. Feldman Group Productions, owned the filming rights to Butler's novel and demanded Lancaster's production be shut down. Feldman also claimed to have purchased the novel's rights from Eagle-Lion Productions, whereas, in defense, Vernon claimed to have procured the rights directly from Butler (through Curtis Brown Limited).

Feldman may have been holding a grudge against Lancaster, who had been approached to co-star in his production of Red River, right before its shooting began in September 1946. At the time, Lancaster was wrapping up Desert Fury and was already booked to film two more films, Variety Girl and I Walk Alone, back-to-back for Wallis at Paramount Studios. It is unknown under which circumstances he and his agent turned Feldman down, but Lancaster's part was quickly offered to Montgomery Clift. Universal-International Pictures proceeded with the production of Kiss the Blood Off My Hands as planned, paying little attention to the lawsuit, which was eventually sustained in favor of the defendants by Judge Stanley Barnes at the Los Angeles Superior Court on July 6, 1948, long after filming had wrapped up.

=== Filming ===
Principal photography started on March 15, 1948, at Universal-International Pictures' Sound Stage 21. with cinematographer Gregg Toland, a six-time Academy Award nominee for his work in black and white films. Toland had won the Academy Award for Best Cinematography in 1940 for Wuthering Heights and had been chosen by Orson Welles to work on Citizen Kane. By the end of March 1948, however, after two weeks of shooting, Toland was replaced by Universal-International Pictures' contracted cinematographer, Russell Metty. Metty had also worked with Welles, on The Stranger, and Lancaster on All My Sons, as well as a number of film noirs and thrillers for Universal-International Pictures and RKO Radio Pictures, including A Woman's Vengeance, Ride the Pink Horse, Ivy, The Private Affairs of Bel Ami, Whistle Stop, The Falcon's Brother, Night Waitress and The Spellbinder. Jack Voglin was brought in as assistant director, having also worked with Welles on The Stranger, on top of two notable film noirs, Guest in the House and The Dark Mirror. Corson Jowett was hired as sound recordist.

Lancaster was often late during the shooting, shuffling between his role as actor and producer. Fontaine also announced her pregnancy with Deborah Leslie Dozier a week after filming began. Her nausea and vomiting forced her to stop every morning at the top of Sepulveda Pass on her way to Universal Studio. She also caught a cold and was out for a total of twelve, non-consecutive days. None of the crew knew if she'd be coming in each morning. This in turn caused problems for Lancaster, who wore a four-day stubble beard in nearly half of the film. Each time Fontaine called out sick, Lancaster shaved his beard to allow for filming of a later scene. Growing his stubble back always took him a weekend.

Lancaster was known for executing his own stunts throughout his career and in Kiss the Blood Off My Hands he wanted to perform the cat o' nine tails whipping scene as authentically as possible. He knew that his facial expression could never replicate the pain unless he was truly experiencing lashing and he insisted that actor Harold Goodwin (playing the role of the whipper) "really lay it on him". The scene was not done with an actual leaded cat o' nine tails, but rather with a split leather belt. Still, Lancaster's back was so blistered and welted the next day that he was unable to wear a shirt.

The fog machine on the set was unreliable and the exterior scenes were often postponed due to heavy rain. Certain scenes could not be reproduced cheaply in studio so they were filmed on location at Griffith Park Zoo and Hollywood Park Racetrack. Newton also caused several delays as he required two days' notice prior to filming each scene in order to properly get into the character's role.

The production did have some funny moments, such as when Fontaine outran Lancaster during a take. This especially surprised Lancaster, who worked out daily, and would soon-after play athlete Jim Thorpe on screen. Lancaster, a former circus performer, often climbed the scaffolding on the set to get acrobatics out of his system. It was during the filming that Lancaster also got the idea to revive his old acrobatic vaudeville duo with partner Nick Cravat, after seeing monkeys swinging on bars and twirling around a pole at Griffith Park Zoo.

Fontaine was noted for her unexcitable temper, even during directional disagreements between Lancaster and Foster. The two fought over story points and Lancaster overstepped his position by directing actors. During one such incident, Fontaine paused, perplexed and asked "I'm a little confused. When Mr. Lancaster was directing the scene, was it decided that I stop here - or should I go on?" In an October 1948 interview with Photoplay magazine, Lancaster mentioned the film's final scene with Fontaine as the most difficult one for which he had to get into character. The scene called for a complete change of heart and character from the role he was playing and Lancaster very much wanted it to be authentic.

Shortly before production wrapped up, Lancaster called in Robert Siodmak, who was freshly back from filming Cry of the City, to shoot some last-minute scenes on Sound Stage 21. Despite a few setbacks, Norma Productions was able to complete shooting on May 14, 1948, only three days over schedule.

=== Post-production ===
Before filming had even begun, Lancaster approached two-time Oscar winner (with an additional six more nominations) Miklós Rózsa in early March 1948 to compose the score of the film. Rózsa had already worked on three previous Lancaster films: Desert Fury, Brute Force and The Killers (the last of which earned him an Oscar nomination). Rózsa was no stranger to the crime, thriller and film noir genre, with additional credits on The Naked City, A Woman's Vengeance, Secret Beyond the Door, A Double Life (which earned him an Oscar nomination), The Red House, The Strange Love of Martha Ivers, The Lost Weekend (which earned him an Oscar nomination), Spellbound (which won him an Oscar), Lady on a Train, Blood on the Sun, The Man in Half Moon Street, Dark Waters, The Hour Before the Dawn, Double Indemnity (which earned him an Oscar nomination), On the Night of the Fire, The Spy in Black, The Green Cockatoo, The Squeaker and Thunder in the City. Rózsa recorded the score in the middle of July with a seventy-five piece orchestra arranged by Eugene Zador.

Milton Carruth, a long-time contract editor at Universal-International Pictures, was selected to edit the film in early April 1948. His work as editor on Alfred Hitchcock's personal favorite film, Shadow of a Doubt, made him a reputable editor, and he had also worked on notable mysteries, horrors and thrillers like The Lost Moment, Dead Man's Eyes, Weird Woman, The Mad Ghoul, Captive Wild Woman, The Mummy's Tomb, Night Monster, Mystery of Marie Roget, Dracula's Daughter, Werewolf of London, The Mummy, Afraid to Talk, Back Street, Murders in the Rue Morgue, Dracula, Night Ride and Outside the Law, making him a perfect candidate to edit Norma Productions' film noir. One of the concerns that the production team had was with regards to the amount of material they could leave in of Lancaster's flogging scene. The Motion Picture Association of America objected, but the producers appealed; it was decided that the preview audience would have a say in the final matter. The preview viewers gave it a favorable approval and the scene was left almost unedited.

After completing a rough cut in early June, Hecht and Lancaster were so impressed by Newton's on-screen performance that they immediately began developing another vehicle for him titled Old Harry Out West, written by Hugh Gray. Norma Productions had hopped to film the picture later in 1948 but the story was eventually dropped in favor of other Lancaster-starred pictures. Sources vary as to when the film finished its post-production stage, ranging between mid-July to mid-September. Upon the completion of the picture, Hecht and Lancaster presented gift baskets of beverages to every member of the cast, crew and company executives affiliated with the picture.

It was during the editing stage of Kiss the Blood Off My Hands, in early June 1948, that Lancaster was approached by Alfred Hitchcock to star in his film production company Transatlantic Pictures' next movie Under Capricorn. Hitchcock, too, had hoped for an all-British cast for his next film, with the exception of star Ingrid Bergman and her then-uncast male co-star. Bergman wanted Charles Boyer; Hitchcock wanted Lancaster. Hitchcock's film was to be photographed in England from mid-July to October 1948. Although it was conveniently timed, what with Lancaster's next picture, Criss Cross, to be filmed from mid-June to mid-July 1948, and his next assignment for Wallis, Rope of Sand, not scheduled to begin filming until late January 1949, Lancaster had other plans. He wanted to hit the road in promotion of Kiss the Blood Off My Hands during the summer of 1948, previewing the picture to audiences in smaller cities, and later that year make personal appearances with a vaudeville act (November 1948 to January 1949). The role in Under Capricorn eventually went to Joseph Cotten; Hitchcock would later tell Francois Truffaut that Cotten was miscast and that the picture would have fared better with Lancaster, but that the later had proved too expensive. Ten years later, Lancaster was signed to star in The Wreck of the Mary Deare, when Hitchcock was to produce and direct the film for Metro-Goldwyn-Mayer, but things changed considerably once Hitchcock left the project to focus on North by Northwest.

=== Title, rating and censorship ===
The title of the film has been subject to a certain level of controversy, which led way to rumors exponentially growing over the years. Universal-International Pictures was never opposed to the film's original title. It was not until March 1948 that the title was questioned. The script had been sent in to the Motion Picture Association of America's Title Registration Bureau (a required procedure at the time) and had been reviewed and approved by Margaret Ann Young, head of the section under Eric Johnston's administration. The Motion Picture Association of America found that Kiss the Blood Off My Hands did not violate any provisions to their code. Young merely recommended that the title be changed and that the whipping scene be kept short. Her decision was based on a comparison between the film's title, the script and the message it gave to the audience. Young had previously conducted a survey in December 1947, and concluded that half of the film titles that were submitted to the Motion Picture Association of America dealt with crime or violence. This trend was later revealed to be partly caused by the rise of film noirs following World War II.

In mid-March 1948, Hecht sent out over five hundred letters to theater owners, exhibitors, circuit heads, bookers and buyers, asking their opinion with regards to the title of Norma Productions' first film. He also contacted over one hundred different universities' psychology department heads and hired Princeton University's Audience Research Institute to conduct a survey.

As late as May 13, 1948, on the eve of completing filming, the movie was still known under its original title, Kiss the Blood Off My Hands. After receiving a considerable amount of feedback from the letters Hecht sent out, Norma Productions volunteered to change the film's title. An internal contest was held at the film production's office which offered $50 to the best new title suggestion. A Universal-International Pictures employee was responsible for suggesting the new title Blood on My Hands, but Dozier's personal secretary at Rampart Productions, Lillian Browne, came up with The Unafraid, which Lancaster liked best as it touched up on the personality of the character he portrayed in the movie. Browne won the $50 prize. The title The Unafraid was first used publicly on May 21, 1948, when Variety announced producer Vernon's newly born child, while he was producing The Unafraid. On May 29, 1948, Boxoffice confirmed the title change, and on June 1, 1948, The Film Daily reported "Norma Productions has just completed "Unafraid", formerly titled "Kiss the Blood Off My Hands", for release by Universal-International". Thusly, from May to August 1948, during its entire post-production stage, the film was known as The Unafraid.

Contrary to popular belief, the title The Unafraid was not derived from the American version of the novel. At the time of Norma Productions' acquisition, the book had already been published twice for the American market, both times in 1946, and both times under its original title Kiss the Blood Off My Hands. The first American edition was a hardcover by Farrar & Rinehart, which was then licensed to Dell Publishing for a "map-back" (a feature popular with thrillers) paperback edition, cataloged Dell 197. It was only once the film was released that Dell Publishing, in cooperation with Universal-International Pictures as a tie-in for the film's promotion, re-pressed the book under the title The Unafraid [Kiss the Blood Off My Hands], in December 1948 (with the catalog number Dell 242). Dell Publishing's second publishing featured Fontaine and Lancaster depicted on the cover art with the text "Starring Joan Fontaine & Burt Lancaster".

In the last week of August 1948, Universal-International Pictures issued a press release announcing that The Unafraid would be released as Kiss the Blood Off My Hands, its original intended title. After further examination, Hecht's letters had come back three-to-one in favor of keeping the original title, and since the Motion Picture Association of American had merely recommended, and not imposed, a change, the title was reverted. The film premiered in late October 1948 and was released in all of the big cities in November 1948 under the title Kiss the Blood Off My Hands. Some areas nevertheless objected to the title; the National Legion of Decency, a fundamentalist Catholic group, rated the film "Classification A-II", which was described as "unobjectionable for adults"; in other terms, for adults only due to moral objections. In addition to this, the Chicago Censor Board also imposed an "Adult-Only" classification to Kiss the Blood Off My Hands. Some areas of California found the title too offensive and changed the title of the film in their marquee, which did not always reflect the title on the screen. While most of the big cities in the United States saw the film advertised and on the screen as Kiss the Blood Off My Hands, the smaller towns and more religiously inclined communities saw it advertised as The Unafraid. Prints sent to commonwealth countries, such as Canada, Australia and New Zealand, were also advertising the film as The Unafraid, though some areas of Ontario, Canada advertised an "Adult-Only" version of Kiss the Blood Off My Hands, due to the Ontario Censor Board. England also refused the film's original novel title and a special version was sent using Universal-International Pictures' title card text Blood on My Hands. The film's title changes and adult ratings only benefited Norma Productions with additional publicity and generating more interest from movie-goers, as the critics continued to describe the film inexplicitly as a romantic drama.

== Distribution ==
=== Preview and release ===
When heading into production in March 1948, Universal-International Pictures had scheduled to release Kiss the Blood Off My Hands in October of that year. Everything remained on schedule and the film was previewed in various cuts during the summer of 1948 to gauge audience reaction. Once the film was ready for general circulation, Norma Productions previewed the film in eleven key cities for members of the press from mid-to-late October 1948. The film officially premiered on Friday, October 29, 1948, at Loew's Criterion Theater in New York City, and opened to over three hundred theaters in the United States starting on October 30 and throughout November 1948.

During its inaugural run at Loew's Criterion Theater in New York City, Kiss the Blood Off My Hands was preceded by the Universal-International Pictures short Buddy Rich and His Orchestra, followed be Columbia Pictures' short Boy and His Dog and finally with the Metro-Goldwyn-Mayer short Pigskin Skill.

=== European distribution ===
On September 24, 1948, The Film Daily reported that Joseph H. Seidelman, head of foreign operations for Universal-International Pictures, took Kiss the Blood Off My Hands and eleven other Universal-International Pictures films (including Rampart Productions' You've Got to Stay Happy and Lancaster's next film Criss Cross which had been filmed from mid-June to mid-July 1948 during Kiss the Blood Off My Hand's post-production) over to Europe for distribution through markets in France, Holland, Sweden, Denmark, Norway, Italy and Belgium. The film opened in Sweden on May 2, 1949, in Finland on August 19, 1949, in France on November 21, 1949, in Portugal on July 14, 1950, in Denmark on March 9, 1951, in Spain on April 23, 1951, in Austria in November 1953 and in West Germany on November 20, 1953.

=== Marketing ===
The film benefited from great publicity, mostly headed by Lancaster as Fontaine was indisposed after giving birth to her daughter. Lancaster wanted to raise awareness for his new production company and made himself available for all of Universal-International Pictures' publicity plans, spending from mid-October 1948 to early January 1949 promoting the film. Two weeks prior to the opening of the film, Hecht and Lancaster, accompanied by Norma Productions' advertising and publicity director William Peirce Jr., and Universal-International Pictures' eastern publicity manager, Al Horwits, went on an eleven city personal appearance tour. Their program included screening Kiss the Blood Off My Hand, exclusively for the press, radio representatives and motion picture exhibitors, followed by a luncheon with the attendees to conduct exclusive interviews. Lancaster also appeared on local radio stations and tie-in events with local stores, and occasionally met with the newspaper press for one-on-one interviews. Starting in mid-October, the promotional team appeared in New York City (October 16), Baltimore (October 19), Philadelphia (October 20 at the Variety Club with special guest Mickey Rooney), Pittsburgh (October 21), Cleveland (October 22 at the Carter Hotel), Rochester (October 23), Buffalo (October 24 with a luncheon with the city's mayor Bernard J. Dowd and an interview on Foster Brooks' radio show), Cincinnati (October 25), Chicago (October 26), Memphis (October 27) and Atlanta (October 28).

Universal-International Pictures' advertising and publicity department, headed by Maurice F. Bergman, came up with an original idea to publicize the film. A week prior to the opening in each of the twenty key cities (and its suburbs), the studio took out a full page, one thousand lines - seven column advertisements, listing all of the theater openings with times and dates for the cities and their surrounding areas. The same advertisement was placed on the day of opening, for each city, in the local newspapers. This was the first time that Universal-International Pictures took out a full-page newspaper advertisement to promote the opening of a single film. Sporting goods stores also featured athletic displays of Lancaster stills from the film, billboards and window displays were positioned in key locations around the city and taxi cabs carried announcement banners on the back of their cars.

Newspapers and motion picture magazines also carried interviews with Lancaster and mentioned his scheduled personal appearances and press conferences. In some magazines, Kiss the Blood Off My Hands was cross promoted with Rampart Productions' film You Gotta Stay Happy, doubling the star appeal for Fontaine.

Lancaster also organized a twenty-minute vaudeville-style opening act to present at three theaters across the country. The act included Lancaster's old acrobatic act, Lang and Cravat, from his days performing in the Ringling Brothers Circus, accompanied by an orchestra, comics, and singers. Joining Lancaster on stage was his old circus and vaudeville partner Nick Cravat, who was still living in New York City and had not worked with Lancaster since before World War II. Lancaster wired Cravat a telegram and initially offered his old friend and partner half of his salary, a reported $8,000-$10,000 a week, to perform with him on stage. Cravat was excited to work with Lancaster again and accepted to do the act for only a third of the original financial offer.

Lancaster's troupe was booked by vaudeville agent Paul Small, who was benefiting from a vaudeville revival in the late 1940s, to play some of the biggest theaters in each city where, in most cases, they were not performing prior to a screening of Kiss the Blood Off My Hands, but rather before larger-budget pictures. Before taking his show on the road, Lancaster tried it out, unbilled and without publicity, for two days at Ken Murray's Blackouts variety show at the El Capitan Theatre on Vine Street in Hollywood.

Starting at the Oriental Theater in Chicago on November 18, 1948, they performed for three weeks opening for When My Baby Smiles at Me, a Betty Grable film for Twentieth Century-Fox Films. The show opened with Lancaster performing a solo gangster act based on his tough guy characters seen in The Killers, Brute Force and I Walk Alone, all while adlibbing with bobbysoxer fans in the audience. Julie Wilson then joined him on stage to perform a parody of Romeo and Juliet's balcony scene and sing a duet, "Pretty Baby". Wilson would then perform the solo song "A Little Bird Told Me". Lancaster returned on stage for another comedy routine with Charlene Harris, the later dressed as a moppet playing the prexy of the actor's fan club and conducting an interview with a Brooklyn accent. In this sketch, Lancaster would do impersonations of Frank Sinatra and Bing Crosby. Wilson returned on stage to sing another solo, "Just One of Those Things" while the stage was set up with the headlining acrobatic set. On occasions Lancaster would rejoin Wilson for another duet, "Nature Boy". Lancaster would then introduce his old friend Cravat, who took the stage and performed a mime act followed by body twisting on parallel bars. Lancaster then rejoined Cravat and the pair performed a trapeze act, a hand to hand balancing act and finished off with Lancaster climbing up a 15-foot pole balanced on Cravat's head (a feat they would replicate in Norma Productions' next picture The Flame and the Arrow), this last apparently made Universal-International Pictures worrisome of their investment. The group The Debonairs were initially to join the promotional tour but their engagement Paris was extended longer than expected.

In each city, different performers warmed up the audience before Lancaster came on. In Chicago, Saul Grauman did an opening act titled Stairway to Melody with three girls, a redhead, a blonde and a brunette, tap dancing with electric bells and dancing on musical stairs. This was followed by Bob Hall who did a comedy singing routine, engaging the audience to sing along. Carl Sands' orchestra provided the music.

After Chicago the troupe traveled west to perform for a week and a half at Riverside Theater in Milwaukee, starting on December 10, 1948. There, they opened for Are You with It?, a Donald O'Connor film for Universal-International Pictures. The Milwaukee gig also featured Saul Grauman as the opening act but followed up with Wilkey and Dare, a song and acrobatic dance boy-girl duo. Chris Cross followed up with a ventriloquist act of impersonations with various dummies, including an imitation of The Ink Spots. The Riverside Theater also featured a large Lancaster poster outside the venue, which women fans would kiss, leaving lipstick imprints. The poster was given to Lancaster on the last day of the performance in Milwaukee.

The touring group arrived in New York City on December 23, 1948, for a three-week run at the Capitol Theatre, opening for Every Girl Should Be Married, a Cary Grant film for RKO-Radio Pictures. New York's opening acts included Gene Sheldon, with his femme stooge, Loretta Fisher, doing a deadpan comedy pantomime act with a banjo, accompanied with bows and bumps to a drum background. Nancy Reed sang two solos, "Sing Hallelujah" and "What Did I Do", followed by Andy Roberts who sang "Black Magic". Waiter Long came on for a tap-dancing routine and the Skitch Henderson Orchestra performed "A Salute to Gershwin", which featured Gershwin numbers with Henderson on the piano. The show did so well at the Capitol Theatre that it was held over for an additional, fourth week, with the unfortunate absence of Lancaster, who was due back in Hollywood for the filming of Rope of Sand for Wallis at Paramount Studios. Lancaster was replaced by comic George Prentice.

While Lancaster was busy promoting the film on the east coast and Midwest, Universal-International Pictures collaborated with Dell Publishing for a movie tie-in repress of Butler's novel under the title The Unafraid [Kiss the Blood Off My Hands] in December 1948. The cover artwork featured the text "starring Joan Fontaine & Burt Lancaster" along with an pulp art illustration of the two actors. The new edition was sold at every book store in the San Francisco, California and Portland, Oregon regions, with local newspapers and newspaper trucks filled with advertisements.

=== Radio adaptation ===
On February 21, 1949, Fontaine and Lancaster reprised their roles for the Lux Radio Theater 60-minute radio adaptation of The Unafraid, broadcast on CBS. Jay Novello, who had a smaller part in the film, played Newton's role on the radio adaptation.

=== Theatrical re-releases ===
The film has been reissued a number of times in theaters. The first revival interest sparked in October 1955, while Lancaster was filming Norma Productions' film Trapeze Paris. The first reissue ran from December 10, 1955, to September 15, 1956, across theaters in the United States, as a double feature with Universal-International Pictures' 1949 film Johnny Stool Pigeon, starring Tony Curtis and Shelley Winters. The Museum of Modern Art in New York City screened the film on October 27, 1977.

The Film Noir Foundation was able to obtain a new 35mm print from Universal Pictures, which they presented on Saturday, February 3, 2007, during their Noir City Film Festival at the Castro Theatre in San Francisco. It was double-billed with I Walk Alone, starring Lancaster, Kirk Douglas and Lizabeth Scott. The Los Angeles Film Festival screened the film on June 2, 2013, at the Billy Wilder Theatre, double-billed with Brute Force, where Lancaster biographer Kate Buford made a personal appearance. The Northwest Chicago Film Society screened the film in February 2014 at the Patio Theater.

=== Television and home media ===
On November 29, 1960, Screen Gems, a subsidiary of Columbia Pictures, leased Kiss the Blood Off My Hands as part of a 75 pre-1948 Universal-International Pictures film lot (which also included Criss Cross) for television airing on CBS.

The film was never officially released on VHS, laserdisc, nor DVD, but poor quality bootlegs circulated, obtained from television screenings. In March 2019, it was announced that Kino Lorber would be releasing the first official home media edition of the film on Blu-ray. The Blu-ray was scheduled for release on June 9, 2020, but was pushed back to July 14, 2020. The release featured a new 2K transfer, the original theatrical trailer, and an audio commentary by film historian Jeremy Arnold.

Shown on the Turner Classic Movies show 'Noir Alley' with Eddie Muller on February 11, 2023.

== Reception ==
=== Box office ===
Although later downplayed as a commercial failure with lukewarm critical reception (perhaps only in comparison to Norma Productions' later films), the film did fairly well at the box office for an independent production and was driven by Lancaster's quick rise to fame. At the time, Lancaster was considered a sound investment, guaranteed for at least $1,000,000 in box office revenue. Within its first week, Kiss the Blood Off My Hands had grossed over $44,000 at Loew's Criterion Theater in New York City alone and Variety ranked it fifth most successful in box office attractions for the month of November 1948. The film broke opening weekend records at The Ritz Theater in Albany, New York when it opened in mid-November 1948.

In January 1949, Variety ranked it 84th in the "Top Grossers of 1948" list, having already made $1,600,000 in box office from the big cities' 1948 showings. It has not been established how much more the film grossed after rolling out to the rest of the United States (smaller towns), the United Kingdom, Canada, Australia and the rest of Europe throughout 1949 and the early 1950s.

=== Critical response ===
Kiss the Blood Off My Hands received a consistently positive critical reception. Critics variously praised every aspect of the film, from its direction and photography, to its production values, its musical score, the strength of the script as well as the acting skills of Fontaine, Lancaster and Newton.

- Boxoffice wrote on October 16, 1948: "This first Harold Hecht-Norma production scores a bullseye with an exciting, romantic and plausible story against striking backgrounds of bomb-shattered London after the war. The acting is of a high order, especially by Joan Fontaine as the girl who loves a tempestuous youth with a criminal record, Burt Lancaster as the youth and Robert Newton as a despicable black marketeer who gets them into his power. From the opening when a man dies from a blow of the youth's fist to the end when the youth and the girl decide to face justice, there is continuous action brought about by the youth's readiness to resort to violence in escaping both from the police and the gangsters. Lancaster succeeds in winning sympathy for the type of character he plays, and makes understandable the girl's love for him. There is no glorifying of crime. Norman Foster directed".
- Showmen's Trade Review wrote on October 16, 1948: "Audience Slant: (Adult) Alternating between cruelty and sentimentality, this unusual mixture packs a certain fascination that grows on you after you have seen the picture. Box-Office Slant: While the film is rough and ready in its action, the fundamental theme is a love story; therefore the ladies, as well as the men, should like it. Go after them. Comment: Here is a most unusual love story. Outwardly the film is a tough, cruel action piece, set in the drab environs of lower middle-class London. But running though all the blunt action is a warm and glowing romance of the tenderest sort, with Joan Fontaine and Burt Lancaster extracting every bit of meaning from the various situations. A fine job of thespianism. Robert Newton is his usual villainous self. The picture will need extra selling to achieve full benefit, but the material is there. You have the Fontaine-Lancaster pairing, Leonardo Bercovici as screenwriter, Norman Foster as director. The big selling job, however, is to tip off the feminine trade that this is fundamentally a heart-warming love story, despite its brutal exterior. The men can take it on the action alone, if they want to. The picture holds a fascination by virtue of its sentiment surrounded by violence. It stays with you after you have seen it-a fact that may make a good word-of-mouth. We hail the team of Joan Fontaine-Burt Lancaster".
- Harrison's Reports wrote on October 16, 1948: "A well-produced melodrama, loaded with suspense, but the material is somber and the action frequently nerve-wracking. The plot, however, which centers around a war veteran whose uncontrollable temper involves him in a murder, which in turn makes him the victim of a blackmailer, grips one's interest to the very end. There is an extremely thrilling chase right at the beginning where the hero, after accidentally killing a man, eludes the pursuing police. It is one of the best chase sequences ever filmed. Burt Lancaster acts the part of the hero with force and conviction and, despite his violent temper, manages to win a measure of sympathy because of his willingness to lead a lawful life, as well as his efforts to protect Joan Fontaine, his sweetheart, who had fatally stabbed the blackmailer in self defense. Miss Fontaine is an appealing heroine, winning one's sympathy because of her efforts to rehabilitate Lancaster. There is no comedy to relieve the tension. The story's locale is London. Richard Vernon produced it and Norman Foster directed it from a screen play by Leonardo Bercovici. Adult fare".
- Motion Picture Herald wrote on October 16, 1948: "Gerald Butler wrote the novel upon which the attraction is predicted. Basic material is interesting as a contemplation of the personal havoc brought by the war on two individuals, no doubt representative of millions in the war-stricken countries. The various acts of violence woven into the story are designed to speed up the conclusion and give the attraction action and movement. At the same time they tend to move into the background the essence of the story which this reviewer assumes to have been the mental struggle confronting the man and the woman before they work out their joint destinies. Some of this is there and, when it shows up, the film takes on strong dramatic import. When it recedes, the film gives ground and becomes another movie. Performances by Lancaster, Miss Fontaine and Newton are good. Production values are high. Dialogue is intelligent in Leonardo Bercovici's screenplay with added lines by Hugh Gray from an adaptation of the novel by Ben Maddow and Walter Bernstein. The title is strong and intriguing, if long for the marquee".
- Variety wrote on October 20, 1948: "Kiss the Blood Off My Hands," adapted from Gerald Butler's novel of postwar violence and demoralization, is an intensely moody melodrama with sufficient emotional kick to make it a good b.o. bet. The striking title, which promises a far greater scoop of excitement than what is delivered, will draw the male customers. But the film actually will find its heaviest appeal among the femme fans who will guzzle this sombre tale of ill-starred romance. The marquee duo of Joan Fontaine and Burt Lancaster also furnishes a substantial back-stop to the wickets. The yarn concerns an uprooted vet of World War II whose life is shattered after he accidentally kills a man in a London pub. Although based on a formula plot, this film is lifted out of the run-of-the-mill class by Norman Foster's superior direction, first-rate thesping and well-integrated production mountings. Extra impact is lent to a middling screenplay by Foster's firm control over the film's pace and his achievement of a unified atmospheric quality. Excellent deep shadow camera work and minor key score by Miklos Rozsa add to the film's consistency. The story opens explosively in a furious chase sequence with Lancaster, as the vet, making his getaway from the bobbies after a fatal brawl in a saloon. During his flight he crosses paths with Joan Fontaine, a hospital worker, and with credible plot development, they fall for each other. Lancaster then tries to go straight but is stopped by Robert Newton, a black marketeer who forces him into a hijacking deal under threats of exposing Lancaster to the police. Latter portion of the film dips into sensationalism with Miss Fontaine stabbing Newton in her apartment while he's making a pass at her. Newton's death is coupled with a powerful cinematic image of goldfish, spilled from a broken aquarium, flapping around the corpse. This is an imaginative touch of horror which gives vividness to a conventional windup which hews closely to the production code. Miss Fontaine and Lancaster make a dash for an outbound ship but finally decide to surrender to the cops. Lancaster delivers a convincing and sympathetic portrayal of a tough hombre who can't beat the bad breaks. Miss Fontaine performs with sensitivity and sincerity in a demanding role. As the heavy, Newton is properly oily and detestable. Rest of the cast only have bit parts which are handled competently".
- Motion Picture Daily wrote on October 21, 1948: In its initial offering, the new Harold Hecht-Norma production unit makes a notable bow. For behind the attention-seizing title of "Kiss the Blood Off My Hands" there rests an absorbing melodrama that appears to be headed for a good box-office. Joan Fontaine and Burt Lancaster head the cast of this tale of a series of baleful events that beset a young couple. Taken from Gerald Butler's popular novel, the film has Lancaster accidentally kill a man in a bar brawl. [...] But a warped and oily character, played with considerable skill by Robert Newton, gets the pair in his clutches. [...] Lancaster and Miss Fontaine are effective in the leads. Under Norman Foster's direction, the camera frames many interesting touches. Richard Vernon produced, from the screenplay by Leonardo Bercovici".
- The New York Times wrote on October 30, 1948: "The process of humanizing Burt Lancaster obviously is not going to be easy and it is going to take time. Mr. Lancaster is handy with his fists and speaks most eloquently when using them. But to develop fully as an actor and to come over to the right side of society he will have to make a break someday, for there are only so many variations on the theme of being misunderstood and Mr. Lancaster has just about exhausted them all. In Kiss the Blood Off My Hands," which opened yesterday at Loew's Criterion. Mr. Lancaster is again fighting an uphill battle against society and "forces" which pressure him into a mood of sullen belligerency. Notwithstanding its gruesome title, "Kiss the Blood Off My Hands" is not a lurid crime picture. It is, rather, a thoughtful, sombre drama of an ill-starred couple and their plaintive struggle for happiness. It is a conventional drama, but a surprisingly interesting one that builds steadily toward a third-act climax (something few films do these days). Leonardo Bercovici has written an orderly screen play, though his central character is not sharply defined. Bill Saunders, a former soldier who developed a violent aversion to taking orders after spending two years in a Nazi prison camp, appears to be more of a born misfit than a man warped by circumstances. Quick-tempered and pugnacious he accidentally kills a man. In a frantic effort to elude the police he breaks into the apartment of Jane Wharton, wins her sympathy and convinces her of his innocence. This is put to a strong test when he gets into subsequent trouble and is sentenced to six months in jail, but by now love has conquered reason. Were it not for the restraint and intelligence that Joan Fontaine brings to the role of Jane Wharton the drama no doubt would come apart at the seams. For one cares more about what is likely to happen to Jane Wharton as she undertakes the reformation of Saunders in a fruitless bid for happiness and perforce of circumstance, entirely believable in this instance, becomes involved in murder herself. Saving this tragic development until the film's final moments, the story reaches a forceful climax, for it leaves to one's imagination the future of this unfortunate couple as they prepare to make an accounting to society. Norman Foster has directed "Kiss the Blood Off My Hands" with keen appreciation for the story's emotional content and he has handled the scenes of violence with striking sharpness. The long chase that starts the film on its way, with Lancaster desperately racing through winding streets and alleyways of the London waterfront, vaulting fences and scrambling up on roofs, is high-tension excitement. Mr. Lancaster's performance is good, but he would do well to drop some of his tenseness and get more flexibility into his acting. Robert Newton, as a cockney schemer who witnessed the killing and attempts to blackmail Saunders, is somewhat flamboyant but still he gets over an effective characterization. "Kiss the Blood Off My Hands" represents a good beginning for the new producing firm of Harold Hecht-Norma (Mr. Lancaster) Productions".
- Photoplay wrote in January 1948: "Murder is an ugly business whether by accident or design. And when the culprit is rugged Burt Lancaster, a belligerent chap full of primitive impulses, it's doubly regrettable. Lovely Joan Fontaine thinks so after their impromptu meeting in her London flat. Instinct tells her Burt is a bad egg and it's best to stay away from him. But he's so persistent, she's so lonely... and only human, after all. Their chance at happiness seems slim, however, when sly Robert Newton, a witness to the murder, keeps popping up with disconcerting regularity. Burt is all for committing one last crime, then starting life anew elsewhere but Joan, bless her, knows that running away never works. Convincing her headstrong sweetheart of that is something else again. Director Norman Foster and performers Fontaine, Lancaster and Newton turn Gerald Butler's novel into a highly effective romantic melodrama. Your Reviewer Says: A lively, lusty thriller".
