= Charles K. Feldman =

American attorney, film producer and talent agent

- Born: Charles Kenneth Gould; April 26, 1905; New York City, U.S.
- Died: May 25, 1968 (aged 63); Los Angeles, California, U.S.
- Education: University of Michigan
- Occupations: Producer and celebrity agent
- Notable work: The Glass Menagerie, A Streetcar Named Desire, The Seven Year Itch
- Spouse(s): Jean Howard (m. 1935; div. 1947) Clotilde Barot (m. 1968)

Charles K. Feldman (April 26, 1905 – May 25, 1968) was a Hollywood attorney, film producer and talent agent who founded the Famous Artists talent agency. According to one obituary, Feldman disdained publicity. "Feldman was an enigma to Hollywood. No one knew what he was up to – from producing a film to packaging one for someone else."

== Early life ==
Charles Kenneth Gould was born to a Jewish family in New York City on April 26, 1905. His father was a diamond merchant who immigrated to New Jersey. Both of his parents, however, died of cancer and he was orphaned at age six, along with his five siblings. He was taken in by Mr. and Mrs. Samuel Feldman at age seven. Feldman was from Bayonne, New Jersey and was a furniture-store owner. A few years later, the Feldmans moved permanently to California.

== Career ==
Charles Feldman studied at the University of Michigan and later became a lawyer, earning his degree from the University of Southern California. He earned money to put himself through college by working as a mail carrier and a cameraman in a movie studio. He became a lawyer for talent agencies, and by age 30, he had become known as a Hollywood attorney; however, he became an agent instead.

=== Agent ===
In 1932, Feldman left his job as a lawyer and co-founded with Adeline Schulberg, the Schulberg-Feldman talent agency which was soon joined by Schulberg's brother Sam Jaffe and Noll Gurney. In 1933, Schulberg left to form her own agency and the company was renamed the Famous Artists Agency. Feldman combined his background as a lawyer with his celebrity connections to help find and contract jobs. Among his first clients were Charles Boyer and Joan Bennett. Feldman's Famous Artists was bought by Ted Ashley's Ashley-Steiner agency in 1962 and renamed Ashley-Famous.

Feldman began using new tactics in his field. He would buy story ideas and contract them to unemployed writers to make into a screenplay. He would also negotiate one-picture deals for a star rather than a long-term studio contract, as was the custom, so clients could work at multiple studios simultaneously. Feldman also combined several clients into one package and sold them to a producer or studio as one unit. Another tactic was the use of overlapping nonexclusive contracts with clients like Irene Dunne and Claudette Colbert, demonstrating flexible alternatives to the so-called iron-clad studio contract in the classical Hollywood era.

In 1942, Feldman was in charge of the Hollywood Victory Caravan for Army and Navy Relief. As an agent, he became friends with major Hollywood figures like Jack Warner, Sam Goldwyn, Gary Cooper, Greta Garbo, and John Wayne, among others.

=== Packaging ===
In June 1942, Feldman signed Marlene Dietrich, Randolph Scott and John Wayne and presented them to Universal for Pittsburgh along with the script and director as a "package".

This idea was the beginning of Hollywood's "package deal". One of his greatest successes was The Bishop's Wife which was produced in 1948. He bought the rights to the book by Robert Nathan for $15,000 and sold the screenplay for $200,000.

Feldman held considerable sway in the making of some films. It was Feldman who suggested to Jack Warner (as a friend) that he recut Howard Hawks's The Big Sleep (1946) and add scenes to enhance Lauren Bacall's performance, which he felt was more or less a "bit part" in the 1945 cut.

=== Charles K. Feldman Group Productions ===
He later produced his own movies instead of selling the screenplays and created Charles K. Feldman Group Productions in 1945. In 1947, he announced a deal that his company would help make three films at Republic Pictures: Orson Welles's Macbeth (1948), Lewis Milestone's The Red Pony (1949) and Ben Hecht's The Shadow. At Republic he also helped produce Moonrise (1948). The Shadow was to be produced through Kirk Douglas' Bryna Productions, with Douglas starring in dual roles of twin brothers, but the film was never made.

On March 1, 1948, Feldman filed a $1,000,000 damage lawsuit against ten people and companies associated with the production of the film Kiss the Blood Off My Hands: Universal-International Pictures, Norma Productions, Eagle-Lion Films, Harold Hecht, Burt Lancaster, Joan Fontaine, Richard Vernon, Gerald Butler, Phil Berg-Bert Allenberg (Berg was Fontaine's agent, who had little to do with the film but was reputable enough to attract attention to the suit), and Allan Collins (president of Curtis Brown Limited's American division, which sold the rights to the novel). Feldman claimed that his film production company, Charles K. Feldman Group Productions, owned the filming rights to Butler's novel Kiss the Blood Off My Hands and demanded that the picture's production be shut down. Feldman also claimed to have purchased the novel's rights from Eagle-Lion Films, whereas, in defense, Vernon claimed to have procured the rights directly from Butler (through Curtis Brown Limited). Feldman may have been holding a grudge against Lancaster, who had been approached to co-star in his production of Red River, right before its shooting began in September 1946. At the time, Lancaster was wrapping up Desert Fury and was already booked to film two more films, Variety Girl and I Walk Alone, back-to-back for Wallis at Paramount Studios. It is unknown under which circumstances he and his agent turned Feldman down, but Lancaster's part was quickly offered to Montgomery Clift. Universal-International Pictures proceeded with the production of Kiss the Blood Off My Hands as planned, paying little attention to the lawsuit, which was eventually sustained by Judge Stanley Barnes at the Los Angeles Superior Court on July 6, 1948, long after filming had wrapped up.

When his company produced A Streetcar Named Desire (1951) Feldman had to fight to protect the script from censorship. He later produced The Seven Year Itch (1955) starring Marilyn Monroe when he was her agent from 1951 to 1955. In 1956, he sold the filming rights of six books to 20th Century-Fox Films, including Heaven Knows, Mr. Allison, The Wayward Bus, Hilda Crane and Bernadine.

In 1960, Feldman acquired the film rights to Casino Royale following the death of Gregory Ratoff who had purchased film rights to the property from Ian Fleming in 1955. A 1967 profile on Feldman said "he still sounds much like an agent when he talks."

In the 1960s Feldman made a number of films to promote his mistress Capucine. These included North to Alaska and What's New Pussycat?.

== Personal life ==
In 1935 Feldman married actress Jean Howard. They fought frequently, and divorced in 1947; however, they remained good friends and even continued to share a house for some time. He also gave up gambling in 1947.

Feldman's mistress for many years was Capucine.

Throughout his life, his biological siblings often sent him letters asking for money. Although he preferred to not have contact with them, he did send money and old clothes. He married Clotilde Barot on April 14, 1968. He died six weeks later of pancreatic cancer, on May 25, 1968. No funeral was held, and he was interred in the Hollywood Forever Cemetery in Hollywood.

== Filmography ==
- The Lady Is Willing (1942) – producer
- The Spoilers (1942) – executive producer
- Pittsburgh (1942) – executive producer
- Follow the Boys (1944) – producer
- The Strange Affair of Uncle Harry (1945) – executive producer
- Red River (1948) – executive producer
- Moonrise (1948) – producer
- Orson Welles's Macbeth (1948) – executive producer
- The Red Pony (1949) – executive producer
- The Glass Menagerie (1950) – producer
- A Streetcar Named Desire (1951) which was nominated for an Academy Award – producer
- The Seven Year Itch (1955) – producer
- North to Alaska (1960) – producer
- Walk on the Wild Side (1962) – producer
- The 7th Dawn (1964) – producer
- What's New Pussycat? (1965) – producer
- The Group (1966) – executive producer
- The Honey Pot (1967) – executive producer
- Casino Royale (1967) – producer

=== Unmade projects ===
- Mr Shadow (1950) – about twin magicians
- Once There Was a Russian (1956)
- Cold Wind and the Warm (1958)
- Mary Magdalene starring Capucine (1962)
- Voyage Out, Voyage In from a story by Irwin Shaw (1962)
- Fair Game (1962) from a story by Sam Locke
- Eternal Fire (1965)
- Lot's Wife (1965) from a script by I. A. L. Diamond starring Leslie Caron and Warren Beatty
- Take the Money and Run – announced for Feldman in 1965 and was directed by Woody Allen after his death.
