= The Naked Truth (1957 film) =

1957 British film by Mario Zampi

- UK film poster
- Directed by: Mario Zampi
- Written by: Michael Pertwee
- Produced by: Mario Zampi
- Starring: Terry-Thomas; Peter Sellers; Peggy Mount; Shirley Eaton; Dennis Price
- Cinematography: Stanley Pavey
- Edited by: Bill Lewthwaite
- Music by: Stanley Black
- Production company: Rank Organisation Film Productions
- Distributed by: J. Arthur Rank Film Distributors
- Release date: 3 December 1957
- Running time: 92 minutes
- Country: United Kingdom
- Language: English

The Naked Truth (U.S. title: Your Past Is Showing ) is a 1957 British black comedy film directed and produced by Mario Zampi, starring Terry-Thomas, Peter Sellers and Dennis Price. The screenplay was by Michael Pertwee.

In the film, a blackmailer with his own magazine threatens several potential victims. He survives several murder attempts by his victims, but is then arrested and placed on trial for an earlier crime. His victims conspire to break him out of prison and send him into exile before he reveals anything about their respective pasts.

== Plot ==
Nigel Dennis is a blackmailer who threatens to publish embarrassing secrets in his magazine The Naked Truth. After attempting to blackmail a famous scientist (who commits suicide), and an MP (who suffers a heart attack in parliament, and probably succumbs), his latest targets are Lord Henry Mayley, television host Sonny MacGregor, writer Flora Ransom, and model Melissa Right. Several of them decide independently that murder would be a better solution than paying. However, it is Mayley who by sheer bad luck nearly ends up the victim of both MacGregor and Ransom's schemes. The four eventually join forces and try again. That attempt also fails, but Dennis is then arrested for an earlier crime.

When Dennis threatens to reveal all at his trial, Mayley comes up with a scheme to break him out of prison and send him to South America, with the help of hundreds of his other victims. They phone in numerous fake calls for help, distracting the London police, while Mayley, MacGregor, and MacGregor's reluctant assistant Porter, disguised as policemen, whisk Dennis away.

Knocking Dennis unconscious periodically, they finally end up in the cabin of a blimp on the way to a rendezvous with an outbound ship. To their dismay, when he comes to, Dennis refuses to go along with their plan, as he in fact never wanted to reveal any of their secrets in court. He was, in fact, optimistic about the trial anyway, and reveals that the evidence was his copies of The Naked Truth which had been destroyed by the plotters earlier. Happy to have outsmarted his opponents again, but unaware of where he is, Dennis then steps out for some air and plummets to the ocean below. When MacGregor celebrates by shooting his pistol, it punctures the blimp, which shoots away into the distance.

== Cast ==
- Terry-Thomas as Lord Henry Mayley
- Peter Sellers as Sonny MacGregor
- Peggy Mount as Flora Ransom
- Shirley Eaton as Melissa Right
- Dennis Price as Nigel Dennis
- Georgina Cookson as Lady Lucy Mayley, Henry's wife
- Joan Sims as Ethel Ransom, Flora's daughter and reluctant accomplice
- Miles Malleson as Reverend Cedric Bastable, Flora's fiancé
- Kenneth Griffith as Porter
- Moultrie Kelsall as Mactavish
- Bill Edwards as Bill Murphy, Melissa's rich Texan boyfriend
- Wally Patch as Fred, paunchy old man
- Henry Hewitt as gunsmith
- John Stuart as police Inspector
- David Lodge as Constable Johnson
- Joan Hurley as authoress
- Peter Noble as television announcer
- Victor Rietti as doctor
- Wilfrid Lawson as Walter, a TV contestant
- Ronald Adam as chemist
- Michael Ripper as greengrocer

== Production ==
The film was based on an original script by Michael Pertwee, who was the regular screenwriter for producer-director Mario Zampi. It was Zampi's first feature made outside Associated British in seven years. The film was announced in February 1957 with Peter Sellers attached; it would be his first lead role.

The movie was shot over 11 weeks starting May 1957 at Walton Studios. "We are out to prove we can bring a picture in within a given budget," said Giulio Zampi, the associate producer. "“Then, and only then, can you begin to think in terms of economy." Shirley Eaton, who plays a lead, became best known for Goldfinger but was in a number of comedies around this time.

The Rank Organisation was focusing on foreign markets at the time and Zampi's films were seen to fit in with that as they performed strong in Europe. "Dad's uninhibited style of picture making is much more popular over there,” said Giulio Zampi.

The movie was the first of several collaborations between Peter Sellers and Terry Thomas, Sellers disliked the number of takes Zampi asked for. One day he told the director, "The way you are making this film is ridiculous. I know much more about the camera than you do. I'll give you one more take and then I’m off." Zampi made a second film for Rank, Too Many Crooks.

The editor of Confidential magazine later sued the filmmakers - Rank, Zampi and Pertwee - for defamation. After the jury emerged split 7 to 5, a mistrial was declared and the claim failed.

== Reception ==
Zampi reportedly made a £25,000 personal profit on the film.

=== Critical reception ===
Variety wrote "Mario Zampi’s well-made farce sets out to get the patrons yocks and achieves its purpose... Though relying more on the sledge hammer than the rapier for its effects, it has few dull moments."

Allmovie described the film as: "a prescient satire of tabloid journalists and celebrity culture, The Naked Truth, is a well-acted British comedy that doesn't quite succeed in melding its black and broad comedy".

Filmink called it "really interesting, Rank’s first black comedy, a genre that had proved enormously popular at Ealing (Kind Hearts and Coronets, The Ladykillers)... The film marked an exciting new direction where Rank could go; one just wishes the film was a little better."

The Radio Times reviewer wrote: "This black comedy supplied Peter Sellers with some of his funniest, and finest, pre-Hollywood material. It's based – as the best British humour often is – on class and sex ... Mario Zampi directs the gags in Michael Pertwee's satisfying script with superb timing."

Leonard Maltin observed: "Sellers (cast as a television star) is a special treat in this amusing satire."

In British Sound Films: The Studio Years 1928–1959 David Quinlan rated the film as "good", writing: "Ealing-style black comedy, full of laughs."
