= The Phantom Shot =

- Directed by: Mario Zampi
- Written by: Walter C. Mycroft
- Produced by: Mario Zampi
- Starring: John Stuart; Olga Lindo; Howard Marion-Crawford
- Cinematography: Bryan Langley
- Edited by: Giulio Zampi
- Production company: International Talking Pictures
- Distributed by: International Talking Pictures
- Release date: 9 September 1947
- Running time: 49 minutes
- Country: United Kingdom
- Language: English

The Phantom Shot is a 1947 British second feature ('B') mystery film directed by Mario Zampi and starring John Stuart, Olga Lindo and Howard Marion-Crawford. It was written by Walter C. Mycroft and marked Zampi's return to filmmaking after he had been interned during the Second World War.

== Plot ==
The film uses the format of a "crime quiz". When Caleb Horder is found murdered, Inspector Webb investigates. The audience is invited to look for clues and deduce the identity of the murderer.

== Cast ==
- John Stuart as Inspector Webb
- Olga Lindo as Mrs. Robson
- Howard Marion-Crawford as Sgt. Clapper
- Louise Lord as Anne Horder
- Ronald Adam as Caleb Horder
- John Varley as Peter Robson
- Cyril Conway as Philip Grahame
- Jock McKay as Angus
- Leslie Armstrong

== Reception ==
The Monthly Film Bulletin wrote: "This is a pleasant film. Though not outstanding, the interest is maintained to the end and the brain is made to work."

Kine Weekly wrote: "The structure of the film is unorthodox as it takes the form of a crime film quiz in which the detective invites the aud)ience to assist in the reconstruction and solution of the crime. Although the action is largely static, being confined to the manor house in which the murder takes place, there is a suspenseful atmosphere of conflict and jealousy which, combined with a well-developed romantic thread and competent direction, assures strong mass appeal."

In British Sound Films: The Studio Years 1928–1959 David Quinlan rated the film as "average", writing: "Not great, but confidently made and a pleasant change."
