= There Is a Death, Elizabeth =

1972 novel by Gerald Butler

- Cover artwork of Robert Hale and Company's 1972 British hardcover edition.
- Author: Gerald Butler
- Language: English
- Genre: Crime, thriller
- Set in: Villefranche
- Publisher: Robert Hale
- Publication date: 1972
- Publication place: United Kingdom
- Media type: Print
- ISBN: 0 7091 2451 1
- OCLC: 16197619

There Is a Death, Elizabeth is a 1972 crime thriller novel by English writer Gerald Butler. It was his seventh and final novel, published after a twenty-one-year absence from the literary industry (his previous novel, Choice of Two Women, was published in 1951).

It was first published as a hardcover edition in Britain by Robert Hale and Company. It was later translated into German by Luise Däbritz, and published in 1974 by Desch under the title Der Tod Kommt, Elisabeth, as part of its Die Mitternachtsbücher series.

== Synopsis ==
Villefranche, which lies between Nice and Monte Carlo, held a strange fascination for John Railton - until its beauty suddenly seemed to shatter before his eyes. There was more than one woman in his life. Perhaps his sins were tiny sins, but they recoiled on him with a fierceness that threatened to crush his whole world to pieces. In this story, tenderness mingles with passion and fear, and as the suspense grows, the reader walks a tightrope between the warmth of family love and the cold harshness of life.

== Publication history ==
- 1972 Robert Hale and Company, UK, first hardcover edition
- 1974 Desch, Germany, paperback edition under the title Der Tod Kommt, Elisabeth, translated by Luise Däbritz (part of the Die Mitternachtsbücher series, catalog 654)
