= Mario Zampi =

Italian film producer and director (1903–1963)

- Born: 1 November 1903; Sora, Italy
- Died: 2 December 1963 (aged 60); London, England
- Occupations: Film director and producer
- Known for: co-founding Two Cities Films

Mario Zampi (1 November 1903 – 2 December 1963) was an Italian film producer and director. A co-founder of Two Cities Films, a British production company, he is most closely associated with British comedies of the 1950s. He later formed his own film production companies, Anglofilm and Mario Zampi Productions.

== Biography ==
Zampi began his career as an actor in Italy at the age of 17. By 1930, he was working for Warner Bros. as a film editor in London. In 1937, he and compatriot Filippo Del Giudice founded Two Cities Films.

While the company was noted for such serious films as In Which We Serve, Henry V, and Hamlet, Zampi is most remembered for comedies. He made his mark with such films as Laughter in Paradise (1951), The Naked Truth (1957), and Too Many Crooks (1959), often in the dual role of director and producer. He made Naked Truth and Too Many Crooks at Rank.

Zampi and Del Giudice had a long feud which had its origins in both men being interned during World War II. Zampi became wealthy, while Del Giudice was broke; in 1958, Del Giudice was living in a tiny room in London but neither would say what caused the feud.

== Filmography ==
Director and producer unless otherwise indicated.

- Tredici uomini e un cannone (1936) producer
- 13 Men and a Gun (1938)
- French Without Tears (1940) producer
- Spy for a Day (1940)
- Freedom Radio a.k.a. A Voice in the Night (1941) producer (uncredited)
- The Phantom Shot (1947)
- Third Time Lucky (1948) producer
- The Fatal Night (1948)
- The Happiest Days of Your Life (1950) producer
- Shadow of the Past (1950)
- Come Dance with Me (1950)
- Laughter in Paradise (1951)
- Top Secret, a.k.a. Mr. Potts Goes to Moscow (1952)
- I Chose Love a.k.a. Ho scelto l'amore (1953) director
- Happy Ever After, a.k.a. Tonight's the Night (1954)
- Now and Forever (1956)
- The Naked Truth, a.k.a. Your Past Is Showing (1957)
- Too Many Crooks (1959)
- Bottoms Up (1960)
- Five Golden Hours, a.k.a. Cinque ore in contanti (1961) director
