= Choice of Two Women =

1951 novel by Gerald Butler

- Cover artwork of Jarrolds Publishing's 1951 British hardcover edition.
- Author: Gerald Butler
- Language: English
- Genre: Crime, thriller
- Set in: French Riviera
- Publisher: Jarrolds
- Publication date: 20 September 1951
- Publication place: United Kingdom
- Media type: Print
- OCLC: 810511355

Cover artwork of Dell Publishing's 1953 American paperback edition.

Choice of Two Women is a 1951 crime thriller novel by English writer Gerald Butler. It was his sixth novel and was written in the hardboiled style, at the height of its popularity. It was first published as a hardcover edition in Britain by Jarrolds Publishing on 20 September 1951; Digit Books issued a paperback edition in 1960. In the United States, Rinehart & Company issued the book as a hardcover edition under the alternative title Blow Hot, Blow Cold on 2 July 1951 (Butler's only novel to receive publication in the United States ahead of its British print); the Dell Publishing paperback edition was also issued under the alternate title in 1953.

== Synopsis ==
On the French Riviera, a weak-willed adventurer is forced to choose between an apparently wealthy woman and a poor but honest barmaid who truly loves him. He makes the wrong choice and becomes drawn into a web of crime by the former.

== Publication history ==
- 20 September 1951 Jarrolds Publishing, UK, first hardcover edition
- 2 July 1951 Rinehart & Company, US, hardcover edition under the title Blow Hot, Blow Cold
- 1953 Dell Publishing, US, paperback edition under the title Blow Hot, Blow Cold (catalog Dell 726)
- 1960 Digit Books, UK, paperback edition (catalog R381)
