= Charles Goldner =

British actor (1900–1955)

- in Brighton Rock (1948)
- Born: Karl Goldner; 7 December 1900; Vienna, Austria-Hungary
- Died: 15 April 1955 (aged 54); London, England
- Occupations: Actor, singer
- Years active: 1940–1955

Karl Goldner (7 December 1900 - 15 April 1955), known as Charles Goldner, was an Austrian actor and singer. He was known for his roles on the West End stage and in various British films during the 1940s and 1950s.

== Life and career ==
Goldner was born into a Jewish family in Vienna in 1900. He originally trained as a singer shortly after the First World War, and performed and directed operettas and revues on stages across Austria, Germany, and Switzerland. Following the Nazi takeover of Austria in 1938, he emigrated to England.

Goldner made his screen debut in the 1940 film Room for Two, and the following year made his West End debut in Once a Crook. He went onto appear in various films, usually in character roles as "foreigners" of various nationalities, including in Brighton Rock, No Orchids for Miss Blandish, Bonnie Prince Charlie, Black Magic, Bond Street, The Master of Ballantrae and The Captain's Paradise.

His London stage work included Watch on the Rhine (1942-43), My Friend Lester (1947), and The Moment of Truth (1951-52). In 1954, he starred in the Broadway musical The Girl in Pink Tights.

== Death ==
Goldner died on 15 April 1955 in London, England.

== Partial filmography ==
- Room for Two (1940) - (uncredited)
- The Seventh Survivor (1942) - Tony Anzoni
- Mr. Emmanuel (1944) - Committee Secretary
- Flight from Folly (1945) - Ramon
- The Laughing Lady (1946) - Robespierre
- Brighton Rock (1948) - Colleoni
- No Orchids for Miss Blandish (1948) - Louis—Headwaiter
- One Night with You (1948) - Fogliati
- Bond Street (1948) - Waiter
- Bonnie Prince Charlie (1948) - Capt. Ferguson
- Third Time Lucky (1949) - Flash Charlie
- Black Magic (1949) - Dr. Franz Anton Mesmer
- Dear Mr. Prohack (1949) - Polish Man Servant
- Give Us This Day (1949) - Luigi
- The Rocking Horse Winner (1949) - Mr. Tsaldouris
- Shadow of the Eagle (1950) - General Korsakov
- I'll Get You for This (1951) - Massine
- The Rival of the Empress (1951) - Generale Korsakoff
- Encore (1951) - Paco Espinal (segment "Gigolo and Gigolette")
- Secret People (1952) - Anselmo
- Top Secret (1952) - Gaston
- South of Algiers (1953) - Petris
- The Captain's Paradise (1953) - Ricco
- The Master of Ballantrae (1953) - Mendoza
- Always a Bride (1953) - Hotel Manager
- Flame and the Flesh (1954) - Mondari
- Duel in the Jungle (1954) - Martell
- The Racers (1955) - Piero, Mechanic
- The End of the Affair (1955) - Savage (final film role)
