= Stanley Black =

English musician (1913–2002)

Background information
- Born: Solomon Schwartz; 14 June 1913; Whitechapel, London, England
- Died: 27 November 2002 (aged 89) London, England
- Instruments: Bandleader; composer; conductor; arranger; pianist
- Years active: 1930s–2002
- Label: Decca

Stanley Black (14 June 1913 – 27 November 2002) was an English bandleader, composer, conductor, arranger and pianist. He wrote and arranged many film scores, recording prolifically for the Decca label (including their subsidiaries London and Phase 4). Beginning with jazz collaborations with American musicians such as Coleman Hawkins and Benny Carter during the 1930s, Black moved into arranging and recording in the Latin American music style, and also won awards for his classical conducting.

== Life and career ==
Black was born as Solomon Schwartz on 14 June 1913 in Whitechapel, England. His parents were Polish and Romanian Jews. He began piano lessons at the age of seven and trained in piano and composition under Rae Robertson at the Matthay School of Music. He was aged only 12 when his first classical composition was broadcast on BBC Radio. His first professional job was for a C.B. Cochran 1930 theatrical revue followed by winning a Melody Maker competition for his arrangement of a jazz chorus the next year.

In the early 1930s, he was employed in dance bands, and had worked with Howard Jacobs, Joe Orlando, Lew Stone, Maurice Winnick and Teddy Joyce by the time he joined Harry Roy in 1936. Black had also broadcast and recorded with several American musicians, including jazz saxophonists Coleman Hawkins and Benny Carter during their stays in England during this decade. Hawkins had first heard Black on late night radio shows with Lew Stone's band. When the two eventually met in London, the reviewer Edgar Jackson suggested they record together, and the two men collaborated on a duet version of "Honeysuckle Rose".

During World War II, Black joined the Royal Air Force, and became involved in managing the entertainment of servicemen based at Wolverhampton. In 1944, he was appointed conductor of the BBC Dance Orchestra, and remained in the job for almost nine years, broadcasting as many as six nights a week.

Black's radio work kept him in contact with a large listening audience, through his incidental music for shows such as Much Binding in the Marsh and the first two series of The Goon Show. He also conducted the BBC Dance Orchestra for the popular comedy show Ray's a Laugh, starring Ted Ray. Black later presented his own programmes on radio and television, including Black Magic and The Marvellous World of Stanley Black.

In the early 1950s, he regularly topped the Melody Maker lists of the most-heard musicians on radio. He was chosen to be included on Decca's first release of long-playing records in the UK in June 1950. This enabled him to continue his conducting, arranging and performing career and resulted many albums. He was particularly popular in United States, as evidenced by his inclusion in the Billboard best-sellers lists. During 1968–69, he was principal conductor of the BBC Northern Ireland Orchestra.

Becoming involved with the film industry, he composed and arranged music for about 200 films. He was appointed music director at Elstree Studios in 1958. He was also principal conductor of the studio orchestra of Associated British Picture Corporation (ABPC) and their musical director composer from 1958 to 1963.

During his life, he conducted many of Britain's major orchestras, and until the 1990s he was still directing regular broadcast sessions at the BBC studios, despite the onset of deafness in later life.

== Honours ==
Black received numerous awards, including the OBE. He was made a life fellow of the International Institute of Arts and Letters, and life president of the Celebrities Guild of Great Britain.

In 2003, Decca released a two-CD set, A Tribute to Stanley Black (473 940-2), including recordings from 1951 to 1979.

== Personal life ==
Black was married to dance band singer Edna Kaye. The couple wed in 1947; they had a son and daughter.

Black died in London, aged 89, on 27 November 2002.

== Works ==
Black is remembered for writing numerous scores for radio, television and cinema, including the theme-tune for The Goon Show.

Other films he composed scores for include Laughter in Paradise (1951), The Naked Truth (1957), Blood of the Vampire (1958), Too Many Crooks (1958), The Long and the Short and the Tall (1961), West 11 (1963), The System (1964), Crossplot (1969), and the Cliff Richard musicals The Young Ones (1961) and his orchestral backing for Richard's follow up, Summer Holiday (1962), which won him an Ivor Novello Award. His work also became familiar to millions of cinema audiences as a consequence of his theme tune and music library for Pathé News, written in 1960.

He also recorded many classical works, including collections of Tchaikovsky and George Gershwin. In 1965 he won a Gramophone Award for his version of Rimsky-Korsakov's Capriccio Espagnol. In addition, he arranged and conducted many commercially successful albums on LP and later CD like Tropical Moonlight, Cuban Moonlight, Black Magic, and series of Film Spectacular and Broadway Spectacular for Decca.

== Selected discography ==
- The Cash Box Instrumental Hits, London LL158
- Plays for Latin Lovers, London LL248
- Jerome Kern's Symphonic Suite, London LL579
- Berlin Suite, London LL811
- Some Enchanted Evening, London LL1098
- Dancing in the Dark, London LL1099
- Carnival in the Sun, London LL1100 (1955)
- Festival in Costa Rica, London LL1101
- Music for Romance, London LL1149 (1955)
- Cuban Moonlight, London LL1166 (1956)
- Music of Richard Rodgers, London LL1209
- Plays for Latin Lovers, London LL1248
- The Night Was Made for Love, London LL1307
- Summer Evening Serenade, London LL1332
- The Music of Lecuona, London LL1438 (1958)
- Music of Cole Porter, London LL1565
- Red Velvet, London LL1592 (1956)
- Tropical Moonlight, London LL1615 (1957)
- Moonlight Cocktail, London LL1709 (Dec 1957)
- Place Pigalle, London LL1742 (1957)
- Sophisticate in Cuba, London LL 1781 (1958)
- The All Time Top Tangos, London PS 176 (1959)
- More Top Tangos, Decca SKL 4812
- Gershwin Goes Latin, London PS 206 (1960)
- Ravel - Bolero, London Phase 4 SPC 21003
- Rhapsody in Blue, London Phase 4 21009
- Spectacular Dances for Orchestra, London Phase 4 SP 21020
- Overture!, London Phase 4 21028
- Great Rhapsodies, London Phase 4 21030
- Exotic Percussion, London Phase 4 SP 44004 (1962) (No. 30 US)
- Spain, London Phase 4 SP 44016 (1963) (No. 33 US)
- Film Spectacular, London Phase 4 SP 44025 (1963) (No. 50 US)
- Film Spectacular Vol.2, London Phase 4 SP 44031
- Music of a People, London Phase 4 SP 44060 (1965) (No. 148 US)
- Broadway Spectacular, London Phase 4 SP 44071
- Russia, London Phase 4 SP 44075
- Film Spectacular Vol.3, London Phase 4 SP 44078
- Broadway Blockbusters, London Phase 4 44088
- Dimensions in Sound, London Phase 4 SP 44105 (1968)
- Fiddler on the Roof, London Phase 4 44121
- Film Spectacular Vol. 4, London Phase 4 44173
- Rhapsody in Blue, London Phase 4 21009
- Digital Spectacular!, London LDP 30001
- Film Spectacular Vol. 5, London Phase 4 SP 44225
- South of the Border, London: Richmond B 20003
- Melodies of Love, London: Richmond B20004
- Music of Jerome Kern and Irving Berlin, London: Richmond B20011
- Accent on Romance, London: Richmond B 20024

== Selected filmography ==
- Dual Alibi (1947)
- It Always Rains on Sunday (1948)
- The Fatal Night (1948)
- Laughter in Paradise (1951)
- Escape by Night (1953)
- The Naked Truth (1957)
- Blood of the Vampire (1958)
- The Trollenberg Terror (1958)
- Further Up the Creek (1958)
- Too Many Crooks (1958)
- Make Mine a Million (1959)
- Jack the Ripper (1959)
- The Battle of the Sexes (1959)
- Hand in Hand (1960)
- The Flesh and the Fiends (1960)
- Hell Is a City (1960)
- Sands of the Desert (1960)
- The Siege of Sidney Street (1960)
- The Full Treatment (1960)
- The Long and the Short and the Tall (1961)
- House of Mystery (1961)
- Double Bunk (1961)
- The Day the Earth Caught Fire (1961)
- The Pot Carriers (1962)
- Maniac (1963)
- 80,000 Suspects (1963)
- West 11 (1963)
- The System (1964)
- Rattle of a Simple Man (1964)
- City Under the Sea (1965)
- Crossplot (1969)
- Valentino (1977)
