= The Jarrold Group =

Privately held company in Norwich

Coordinates: 52.6291°N 1.2935°E

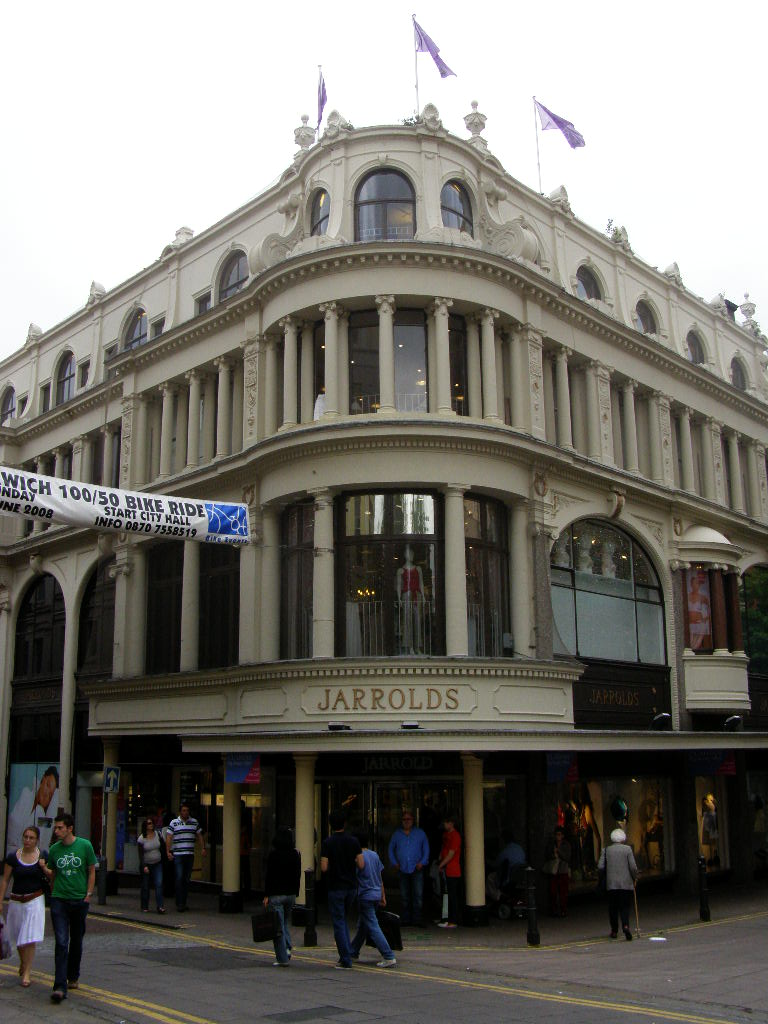
- Jarrolds store, Norwich
- Company type: Privately held company
- Industry: Retail; Property; Training
- Founded: 1770
- Founder: John Jarrold (1745–75)
- Headquarters: Norwich, England
- Number of employees: over 450
- Subsidiaries: Jarrold Properties; Jarrold Retail; Jarrold Training; St James Facility Management
- Website: jarrold.com

The Jarrold Group is a Norwich–based company, founded as Jarrold & Sons Ltd, in 1770, by John Jarrold, at Woodbridge, Suffolk, before relocating to Norfolk in 1823. The Jarrold Group still involves members of the Jarrold family.

== Family ==
Of Huguenot ancestry, the Jerauld family arrived in Essex from France in the late 17th century. Samuel Jarrold served as Mayor of Colchester for 1723/24 and during the 18th century the Jarrolds expanded their mercantile ventures throughout East Anglia, becoming established in Norwich.

The family maintains its record of civic service until the present day: (Herbert) John Jarrold CBE was elected Lord Mayor of Norwich for 1971/72, Peter Jarrold DL (father of Julian, the film director) as Sheriff of Norwich for 1999/2000, and since 2018 Caroline Jarrold DL serves as a Deputy Lieutenant for Norfolk. The Jarrold family also participates in the civic life of the City of London as liverymen of the Haberdashers' and Stationers' Companies.

== Business ==
Primarily a retail business, Jarrolds department store in Norwich city centre, was designed by George John Skipper between 1903 and 1905. Sir Nikolaus Pevsner describes the Jarrolds store as "baroque" in style. Jarrolds have several shops in Norwich, as well as in Wymondham and Cromer.

Non-retail divisions of the Jarrold Group of Companies include Jarrold Properties, Jarrold Training, and St James Facility Management.

In 2004 Jarrold and Sons announced its intention to sell off a 70% stake of its "Norwich-based magazine printer Jarrold Printing" whose portfolio at that time included "NatMags Esquire, Good Housekeeping, Harpers & Queen and Country Living" and which was also producing "IPC, Emap and the Financial Times". Jarold and Sons' "other business interests in retail, publishing, training and property" were to continue as before.

Jarrolds sponsored the construction of a new stand at Norwich City F.C.'s Carrow Road football ground; known as The Jarrold Stand, the original sponsorship deal ceased in 2016.

=== Publishing activities ===
John Jarrold Jr. diversified the firm into publishing as early as 1823 and in 1877 it published the first edition of the children's classic, Anna Sewell's Black Beauty.

Beginning in the 1920 the firm published Discovery: The Magazine of Scientific Progress for several decades.

In 1936 the firm entered the world of paperback book series when it published the Jarrolds' Jackdaw Library and followed up in 1939 by launching its Jackdaw Crime Series.

=== Book series ===
The following series were published by Jarrold Publishers (Jarrold & Sons Ltd, Norwich) or one of its imprints, such as Jarrold Colour Publications:

- The Cotman-Colour Series (some titles also referred to as Jarrold Colour Books)
- The Empire Educational Series
- Jackdaw Crime Series
- Jarrold Aquatic Life Series
- Jarrold Area Guides
- Jarrold Bird Series
- Jarrold Countryside Series
- Jarrold Garden Series
- Jarrold Glaven Series
- Jarrold Nature Series Books
- Jarrold Sports series AKA I Can Play
- Jarrold Tableau Series
- Jarrold Tree Series
- The Jarrold "White Horse" Series
- Jarrolds' Jackdaw Library
- Jarrold's Pocket Companions
- Ordnance Survey Landranger Guides (joint publisher: Ordnance Survey, Southampton)
- Ordnance Survey Travelmaster Guides (joint publisher: Ordnance Survey, Southampton)

== See also ==
- Julian Jarrold
