= Cameron Douglas =

American actor

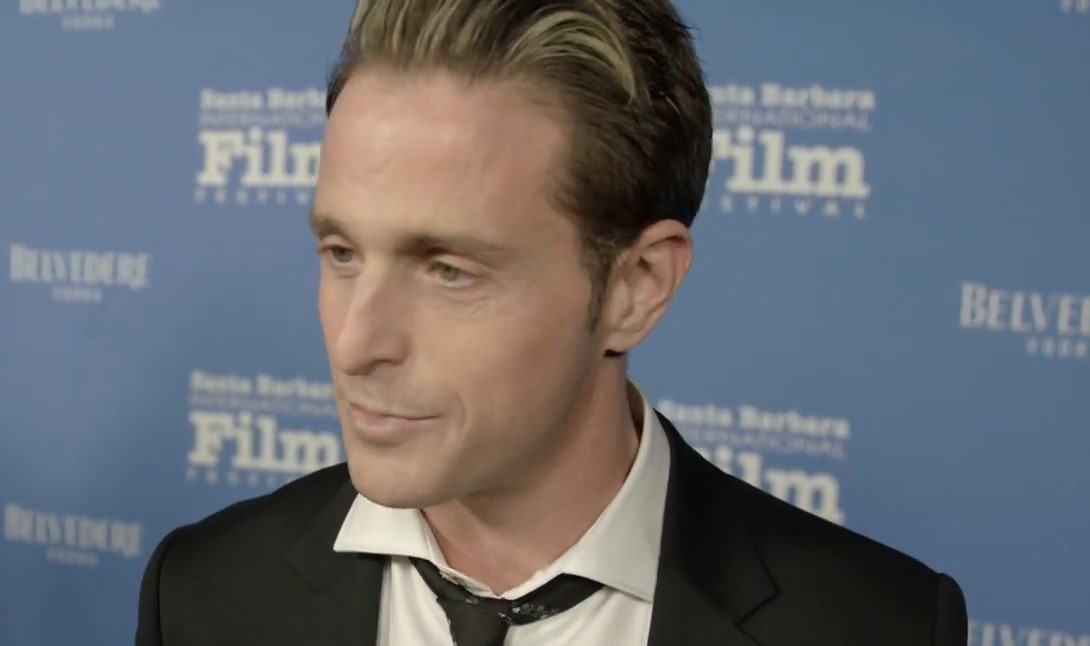
- Douglas at the 2019 Santa Barbara International Film Festival
- Born: Cameron Morrell Douglas; December 13, 1978 (age 47); Santa Barbara, California, U.S.
- Occupation: Actor
- Years active: 1997–2009; 2016–present
- Partner: Viviane Thibes (2016–2024)
- Children: 2
- Father: Michael Douglas
- Relatives: Kirk Douglas (grandfather); Diana Douglas (grandmother); Joel Douglas (uncle); Peter Douglas (half-uncle); Eric Douglas (half-uncle); Thomas Melville Dill (great-grandfather); Nicholas Bayard Dill (great-uncle); Nick Dill (second cousin); Catherine Zeta-Jones (stepmother); Anne Buydens (step-grandmother); William Legge, 10th Earl of Dartmouth (stepfather)

Cameron Morrell Douglas (born December 13, 1978) is an American actor.

== Early life and family ==
Douglas was born on December 13, 1978, the only child of Diandra Morrell (née Luker) and actor Michael Douglas. He is the grandson of actor Kirk Douglas and Bermudian actress Diana Dill. On December 14, 1978, the day after his birth, his grandfather registered The Bryna Company subsidiary Cameron Productions, Incorporated, named after his first grandson. His parents divorced in 2000.

Through his father's second marriage to Catherine Zeta-Jones, Douglas has two paternal half-siblings.

Through his mother, Douglas has 3 half-siblings (biological twins and one adopted).

== Career ==
He has appeared in several films, among them Jackie Chan's Mr. Nice Guy (1997), It Runs in the Family (2003), National Lampoon's Adam & Eve (2005) and Loaded (2008). It Runs in the Family featured three generations of the Douglas family, as it also starred his father, Michael, and paternal grandparents, Kirk and Diana.

== Legal issues ==
=== Drug dealing and conviction ===
In 2007, he was charged with felony possession of a controlled substance after police officers found a syringe with liquid cocaine in a car he was in. On July 28, 2009, aged 30, Douglas was arrested by the Drug Enforcement Administration for possession of 8 ounces of methamphetamine. Due to the large amount of the drug seized, Douglas was charged with intent to distribute. The charge carries a minimum prison sentence of 10 years and a maximum of life.

On January 27, 2010, aged 31, Douglas pleaded guilty to conspiracy to distribute drugs and heroin possession after his girlfriend had smuggled heroin hidden inside an electric toothbrush and passed it on to him while he was under house arrest. On April 20, 2010, Douglas was sentenced to five years in prison for possessing heroin and dealing large amounts of methamphetamine and cocaine out of a New York hotel room. Michael Douglas publicly assumed blame for "being a bad father" but said that without prison intervention, Cameron "was going to be dead or somebody was gonna kill him. I think he has a chance to start a new life, and he knows that."

In October 2011, aged 32, Douglas pleaded guilty to possessing drugs in prison. In December 2012, his leg was broken by another inmate. On April 15, 2013, when he was 34, his extended prison sentence was affirmed by the Second U.S. Circuit Court of Appeals. The Supreme Court denied his final appeal on January 13, 2014, one month after his 35th birthday.

=== Release from prison ===
On August 1, 2016, aged 37, Douglas was released early from prison and transferred to a halfway house in New York City after seven years behind bars, with two of the seven years in segregated housing.

== Personal life ==
His book, Long Way Home, is about his experiences after being convicted on drug charges.

From 2016 to 2024, Douglas was in a relationship with Viviane Thibes. They have two children, a daughter born in 2017 and a son born in 2020.

== Filmography ==
Year	Title	Role	Notes
1997	Mr. Nice Guy	Giancarlo's Man	
2003	It Runs in the Family	Asher Gromberg	
2005	National Lampoon's Adam & Eve	Adam	
2008	Loaded	Rick	
2009	The Perfect Beat	DJ Mojo	Short
2019	Dead Layer	Danny Engel	Short
2021	The Runner	Detective Wall	
2022	Wire Room	Mike Axum	
2025	Looking Through Water	Cole McKay	
