= Michael Douglas =

American actor (born 1944)

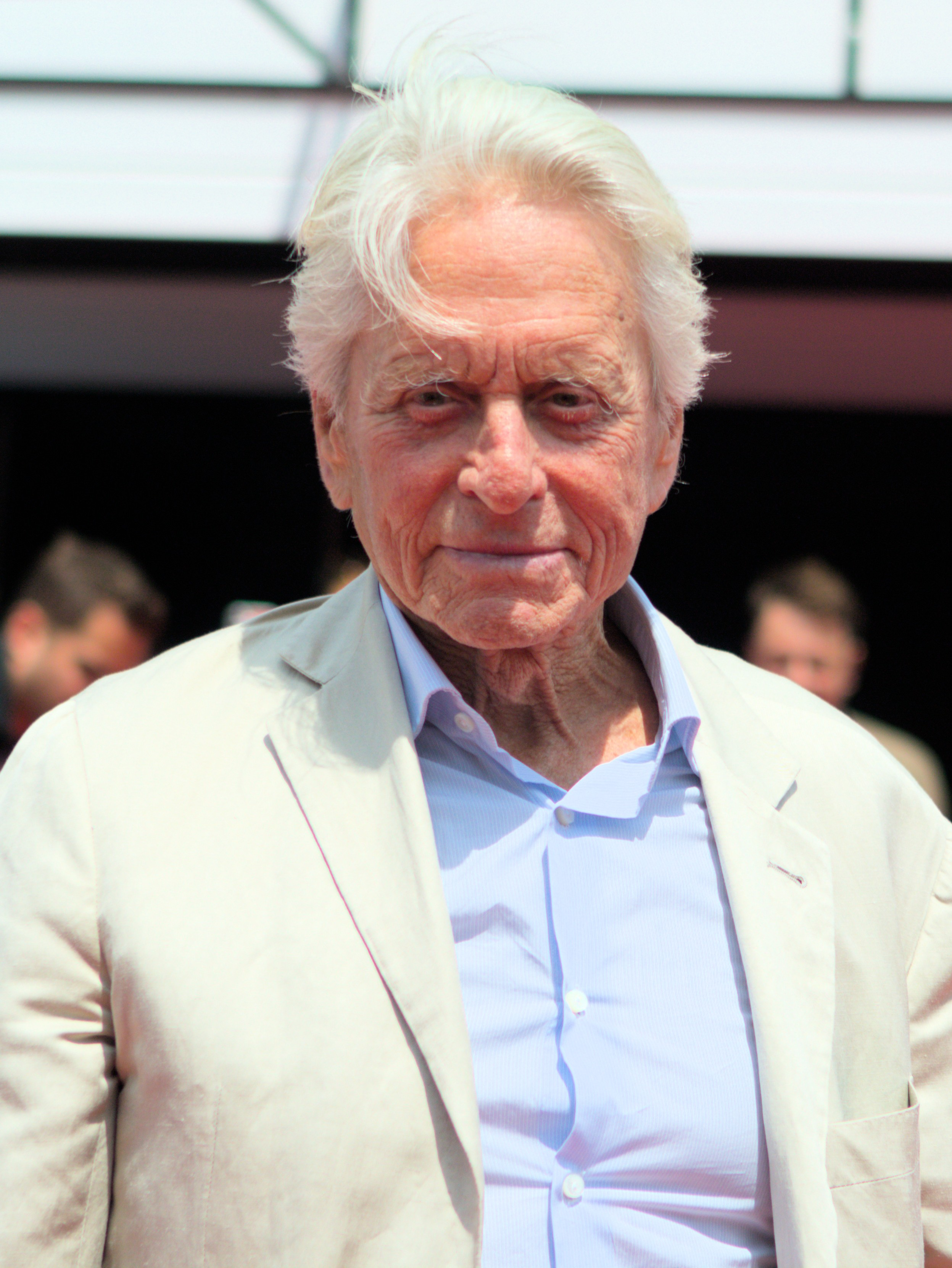
- Douglas at the 59th Karlovy Vary International Film Festival in 2025
- Born: Michael Kirk Douglas; September 25, 1944 (age 82); New Brunswick, New Jersey, U.S.
- Citizenship: United States; United Kingdom (Bermuda)
- Education: University of California, Santa Barbara (B.A.)
- Occupations: Actor; film producer
- Years active: 1966–present
- Works: Full list
- Spouses: Diandra Luker (m. 1977; div. 1995); Catherine Zeta-Jones (m. 2000)
- Partner: Brenda Vaccaro (1971–1976)
- Children: 3, including Cameron Douglas
- Parent(s): Kirk Douglas; Diana Dill
- Relatives: Joel Douglas (brother); Peter Douglas (half-brother); Eric Douglas (half-brother); Anne Buydens (stepmother)
- Awards: Full list

Michael Kirk Douglas (born September 25, 1944) is an American actor and film producer. He has received numerous accolades, including two Academy Awards, five Golden Globe Awards, a Primetime Emmy Award, the Cecil B. DeMille Award, the Honorary Palme d'Or and the AFI Life Achievement Award.

The elder son of Kirk Douglas and Diana Dill, Douglas earned his Bachelor of Arts in drama from the University of California, Santa Barbara. He produced One Flew Over the Cuckoo's Nest (1975), having acquired the rights to the novel from his father and later earned the Academy Award for Best Picture as a producer. Douglas won the Academy Award for Best Actor for his portrayal of Gordon Gekko in Oliver Stone's Wall Street (1987), a role which he reprised in the sequel Wall Street: Money Never Sleeps (2010). Other notable roles include in The China Syndrome (1979), Romancing the Stone (1984), The Jewel of the Nile (1985), Fatal Attraction (1987), The War of the Roses (1989), Basic Instinct (1992), Falling Down (1993), The American President (1995), The Game (1997), Traffic (2000), Wonder Boys (2000), and Solitary Man (2009).

On television, Douglas started his career earning three consecutive Emmy Award nominations for playing a homicide inspector in the ABC police procedural series The Streets of San Francisco (1972–1976). He won the Primetime Emmy Award for Outstanding Lead Actor in a Miniseries or a Movie for portraying Liberace in the HBO film Behind the Candelabra (2013), and a Golden Globe Award for Best Actor – Television Series Musical or Comedy for playing an aging acting coach in the Netflix comedy series The Kominsky Method (2018–2021). He played Benjamin Franklin in the Apple TV+ miniseries Franklin (2024). From 2015 to 2023, He portrayed Hank Pym in the Marvel Cinematic Universe. He announced his retirement from acting in 2025, citing his age and desire to spend more time with his family as being the deciding factors for him.

Douglas has received notice for his humanitarian and political activism. He sits on the board of the Nuclear Threat Initiative, is an honorary board member of the anti-war grant-making foundation Ploughshares Fund and he was appointed as a United Nations Messenger of Peace in 1998. He has been married to actress Catherine Zeta-Jones since 2000.

== Early life and education ==
Douglas was born in New Brunswick, New Jersey, the first child of actors Kirk Douglas (1916–2020) and Diana Dill (1923–2015). His parents met at the American Academy of Dramatic Arts.

Kirk Douglas was Jewish and was originally named Issur Danielovitch. Michael's paternal grandparents were emigrants from Chavusy in the Russian Empire (present-day Belarus). His mother was from Devonshire Parish, Bermuda, and had English, Irish, Scottish, Welsh, French, Belgian, and Dutch ancestry. Douglas's uncle was politician Sir Nicholas Bayard Dill, and Douglas's maternal grandfather, Lieutenant-Colonel Thomas Melville Dill, served as Attorney General of Bermuda, as a Member of the Parliament of Bermuda (MCP), and as commanding officer of the Bermuda Militia Artillery. Douglas is a US citizen by birth in the United States and has Bermudian Status from his mother's birth in Bermuda.

Kirk Douglas family tree

Diana Dill	Kirk Douglas	Anne Buydens
Diandra Luker	Michael Douglas	Catherine Zeta-Jones	Joel Douglas	Peter Douglas	Lisa Schroeder	Eric Douglas
Viviane Thibes	Cameron Douglas	Dylan Michael Douglas	Carys Zeta Douglas	Kelsey Douglas	Tyler Douglas	Ryan Douglas	Jason Douglas
Lua Izzy Douglas	Ryder Douglas

Notes:

His great-grandfather, Thomas Newbold Dill (1837–1910), was a merchant, an MCP for Devonshire Parish from 1868 to 1888, a member of the legislative council and an assistant justice from 1888, mayor of the City of Hamilton from 1891 to 1897, served on numerous committees and boards, and was a member of the Devonshire Church (Church of England) and Devonshire Parish vestries. Thomas Newbold Dill's father, another Thomas Melville Dill, was a sea captain who took the Bermudian-built barque Sir George F. Seymour from Bermuda to Ireland in thirteen days in March 1858, but lost his master's certificate after the wreck of the Bermudian-built Cedrine on the Isle of Wight while returning the last convict laborers from the Royal Naval Dockyard in Bermuda to Britain in 1863. The current (installed on May 29, 2013) Bishop of Bermuda, the Right Reverend Nicholas Dill, is a cousin of Michael Douglas.

Douglas has a younger brother, Joel Douglas (born 1947), and two paternal half-brothers, Peter Douglas (born 1955) and Eric Douglas (1958–2004), from stepmother Anne Buydens.

Douglas attended The Allen-Stevenson School in New York City, Eaglebrook School in Deerfield, Massachusetts, and The Choate Preparatory School (now Choate Rosemary Hall) in Wallingford, Connecticut. He received his B.A. in dramatic art from the University of California, Santa Barbara in 1968, where he was also the honorary president of the UCSB Alumni Association. He studied acting with Wynn Handman at The American Place Theatre in New York City.

Starting in 1966, Douglas acted at the Eugene O'Neill Theater Center, which his step-father Bill Darrid helped found. Douglas described the experience as transformative for his acting career. Douglas featured in multiple productions, including early versions of Ron Cowen's Summertree and Lanford Wilson's Lemon Sky. He worked frequently with director Lloyd Richards, who he described as "a great teacher" who helped him develop his acting ability. At the O'Neill, he met and befriended Danny DeVito, whom he would later live with in New York after graduating from UCSB. Douglas later joined the board of the O'Neill in 1980 and presented the organization with the Regional Theatre Tony Award in 2010.

== Career ==
=== 1969–1979: Early years ===
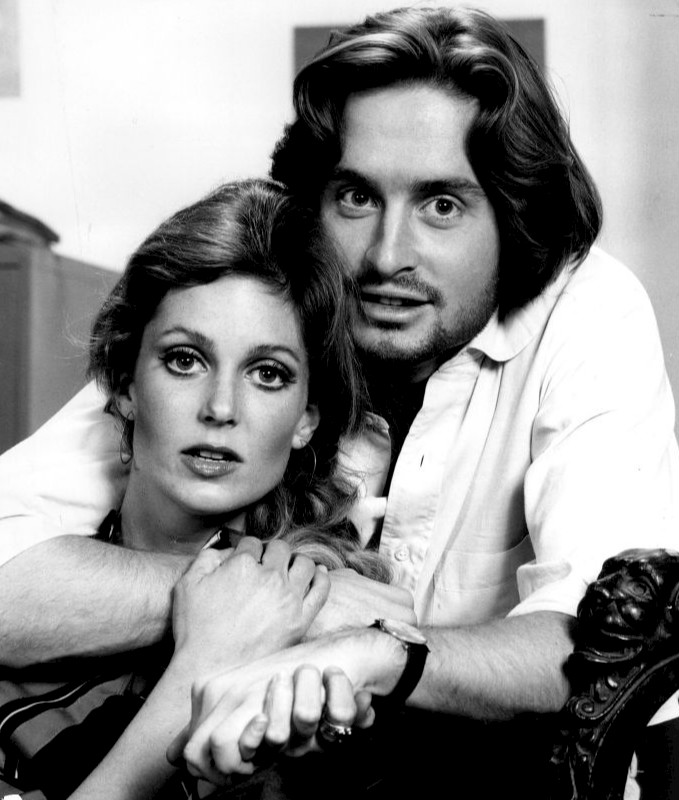
Douglas with Tisha Sterling in the CBS Playhouse production The Experiment in 1969, Douglas's first television role

Douglas started his film career in the late 1960s and early 1970s, appearing in little known films such as Hail, Hero!, Adam at 6 A.M., and Summertree. His performance in Hail, Hero! earned him a nomination for the Golden Globe Award for Most Promising Male Newcomer. On November 24, 1969, Douglas formed his first independent film production company, Bigstick Productions, Limited.

His first TV breakthrough role came with a 1969 CBS Playhouse special, The Experiment—and it was the only time he was billed as "M.K. Douglas". His first significant role came in the TV series The Streets of San Francisco from 1972 to 1976, in which he starred alongside Karl Malden. Douglas later said that Malden became a "mentor" and someone he "admired and loved deeply". After Douglas left the show, he had a long association with his mentor until Malden's death on July 1, 2009. In 2004, Douglas presented Malden with the Monte Cristo Award of the Eugene O'Neill Theater Center in Waterford, Connecticut for the Lifetime Achievement Award.

In late 1971, Douglas received from his father, Kirk, the rights to the novel One Flew Over the Cuckoo's Nest, which had been purchased by Bryna Productions in February 1962. Michael went on to produce the film of the same name with Saul Zaentz. Kirk hoped to portray Randle McMurphy himself, having starred in an earlier stage version, but the director, Miloš Forman, went with Jack Nicholson, who won the Academy Award for Best Actor. Douglas won the Academy Award for Best Picture for producing the film. In December 1976, Michael and his brother Peter became head of their father's film production company, The Bryna Company, though Michael would depart by 1978 to focus exclusively on producing through his own Bigstick Productions.

After leaving The Streets of San Francisco in 1976, Douglas played a hospital doctor in the medical thriller Coma (1978), and in 1979 he played the role of a troubled marathon runner in Running. In 1979, he both produced and starred in The China Syndrome, a dramatic film co-starring Jane Fonda and Jack Lemmon about a nuclear power plant accident (the Three Mile Island accident took place 12 days after the film's release). The film was considered "one of the most intelligent Hollywood films of the 1970s". In June 1979, Douglas appointed Jack Brodsky as executive vice-president of Bigstick Productions.

=== 1980–2000: Success in Hollywood ===
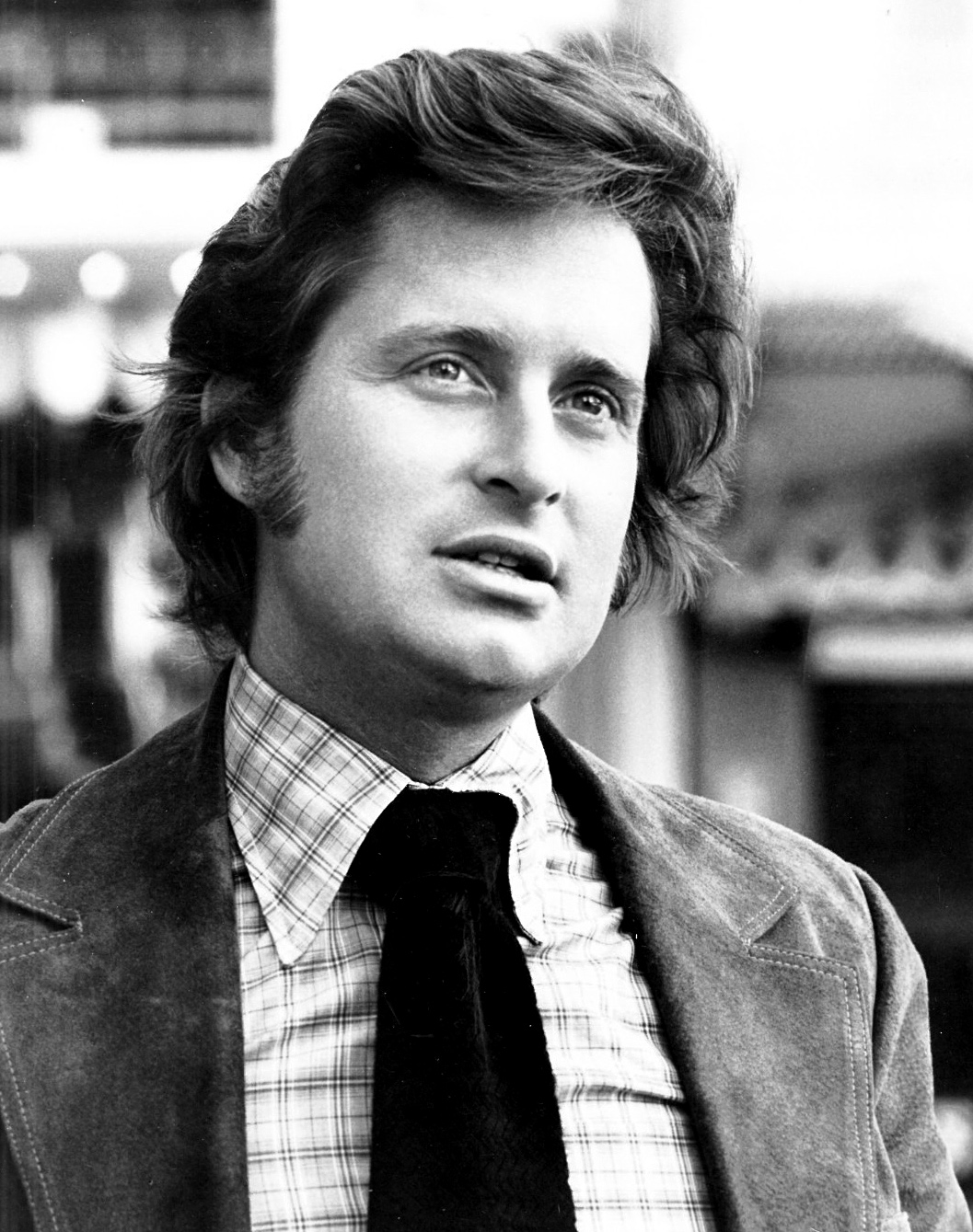
Douglas in The Streets of San Francisco, c. 1975

Douglas's acting career was propelled to fame when he produced and starred in the 1984 romantic adventure comedy Romancing the Stone. It also reintroduced Douglas as a capable leading man, giving director Robert Zemeckis his first box-office success. The film also starred Kathleen Turner and Danny DeVito, a friend of Douglas's with whom he had shared an apartment in the 1960s. It was followed a year later by a sequel, The Jewel of the Nile, which he also produced. Bigstick Productions was then partnered with Mercury Entertainment, a company backed by producer Michael Phillips in 1986 to produce independently financed features. In the 1980s, Douglas formed a new film production company, The Stone Group (later renamed Stonebridge Entertainment) with partner Rick Bieber.

In 1987, Douglas starred in the thriller Fatal Attraction with Glenn Close. That same year he played tycoon Gordon Gekko in Oliver Stone's Wall Street for which he received an Academy Award as Best Actor. He reprised his role as Gekko in the sequel Wall Street: Money Never Sleeps in 2010, also directed by Stone.

Douglas starred in the 1989 film The War of the Roses, which also starred Turner and DeVito. In 1989 he starred in Ridley Scott's international police crime drama Black Rain opposite Andy García and Kate Capshaw; the film was shot in Osaka, Japan.

In 1992, Douglas founded the short-lived Atlantic Records distributed label Third Stone Records. He founded the label with record producer Richard Rudolph, who became the company's president and CEO. Among the acts signed to Third Stone were Saigon Kick and Nona Gaye.

That same year, Douglas had another successful starring role when he appeared alongside Sharon Stone in the film Basic Instinct. The movie was a box office hit and sparked controversy over its depictions of bisexuality and lesbian people. In March 1994, Douglas announced that he had formed a new film production company, Douglas/Reuther Productions, in partnership with Steven Reuther. In 1994 Douglas and Demi Moore starred in the hit movie Disclosure focusing on the topic of sexual harassment with Douglas playing a man harassed by his new female boss. Other popular films he starred in during the decade were Falling Down (1993), The American President (1995), The Ghost and the Darkness (1996), The Game (1997, directed by David Fincher), and a remake of Alfred Hitchcock's classic – Dial M for Murder – titled A Perfect Murder (1998). In 1998 Douglas received the Crystal Globe award for outstanding artistic contribution to world cinema at the Karlovy Vary International Film Festival. On November 19, 1997, Douglas formed his fourth film production company, Further Films.

In 2000, Douglas starred in Steven Soderbergh's critically acclaimed film Traffic, opposite Benicio del Toro and future wife, Catherine Zeta-Jones. Douglas and the cast of Traffic were awarded a Screen Actors Guild Award for Outstanding Performance by a Cast in a Motion Picture. That same year he also received critical acclaim for his role in Wonder Boys, as a professor and novelist suffering from writer's block. He was nominated for a Golden Globe Award for Best Actor in a Drama and the BAFTA Award for Best Actor in a Leading Role.

=== 2001–2012: Established actor ===
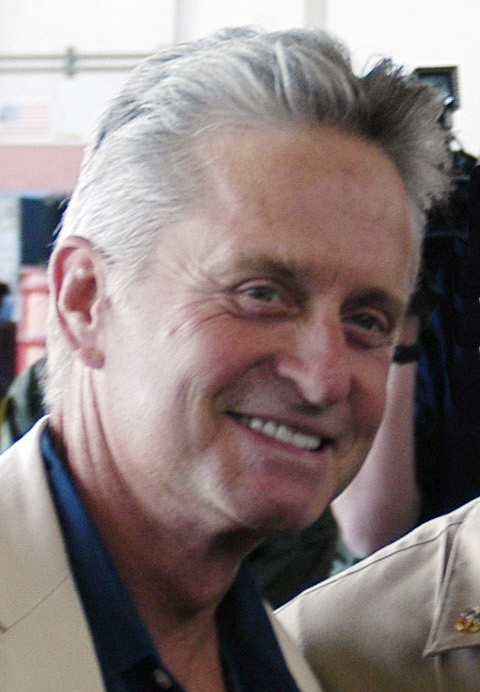
Douglas in June 2004

Douglas starred in Don't Say a Word (2001), filmed shortly before his marriage to Zeta-Jones. In 2003, he starred in It Runs in the Family, which featured three generations of his family (his parents, Kirk and Diana, as well as his son, Cameron). Although a labor of love, the film was not successful, critically or at the box office. Also in 2003, Douglas starred in The In-Laws. Douglas was awarded the Cecil B. DeMille Award at the Golden Globes in 2004. Michael and Kirk Douglas are the only father and son pair to have both been awarded this recognition. He then starred in and produced the action-thriller The Sentinel in 2006. During that time, he also guest starred on the episode "Fagel Attraction" of the television sitcom Will & Grace as a gay cop attracted to Will Truman (Eric McCormack); the performance earned Douglas an Emmy Award nomination for Outstanding Guest Actor in a Comedy Show. Douglas was also the voice of founding father Benjamin Franklin in Freedom: A History of US, the PBS television adaptation of Joy Hakim's 10-volume book A History of US.

Douglas was approached for Basic Instinct 2, but declined to participate in the project. In 2006, Douglas was Mr. Thompson in You, Me, and Dupree. The following year, Douglas played Charlie in King of California. In December 2007, Douglas began announcing the introduction to NBC Nightly News. Howard Reig, the previous announcer, had retired two years earlier. That same year, Douglas received the Career Achievement Award from the National Board of Review.

In 2009, Douglas starred in Ghosts of Girlfriends Past, Beyond a Reasonable Doubt, and Solitary Man. Also in 2009, he was honored with the American Film Institute's Lifetime Achievement Award and the David O. Selznick Achievement Award in Theatrical Motion Pictures from the Producers Guild of America. In 2011, Douglas voiced Waylon on Disney Channel's cartoon Phineas and Ferb and starred in the dramatic thriller Haywire. He was also honored that year by the French Minister of Culture with the Ordre des Arts et des Lettres with the rank of Commandeur. In 2012, Douglas was honored with the Monte Cristo Award for Lifetime Achievement from the Eugene O'Neill Theater Center for his "monumental achievements and contributions to the American and international theater community."

=== 2013–present: Resurgence, expansion, and semi-retirement ===
Douglas collaborated with Soderbergh again on the 2013 film Behind the Candelabra, playing Liberace, opposite Matt Damon as Scott Thorson. The film dramatizes the last 10 years of the pianist's life and the relationship he had with Thorson. His portrayal of Liberace received critical acclaim, which resulted in him receiving the Emmy Award for Outstanding Lead Actor in a Miniseries or a Movie at the 65th Primetime Emmy Awards. He also won SAG and Golden Globe Awards for the performance. Also that year, he starred in Last Vegas, a comedy also starring Robert De Niro, Morgan Freeman, and Kevin Kline. In 2014, Douglas starred alongside Diane Keaton in the romantic comedy, And So It Goes and he produced and starred in Beyond the Reach.

He played Hank Pym, the Marvel Comics superhero, in the films Ant-Man (2015), Ant-Man and the Wasp (2018), Avengers: Endgame (2019), and Ant-Man and the Wasp: Quantumania (2023). In 2016, Douglas received his second Cesar d'Honneur for Career Achievement from the French Cesar Awards; the first was in 1998. In 2017, Douglas starred in the action thriller Unlocked.

In 2018, he starred with Alan Arkin in The Kominsky Method, playing Sandy Kominsky, an aging acting coach. He received a Golden Globe Award for his performance. The same year, he starred in a Chinese film, Animal World, based on the Japanese manga series Kaiji. In 2018, Douglas received a star on the Hollywood Walk of Fame.

Starting in 2019, Douglas voiced the character Guy-Am-I in the Netflix animated series Green Eggs and Ham. In 2023, Douglas reprised the role of Hank Pym, voicing the character in the animated series What If...? (2021–2023). In May 2023, Douglas was honored with an Honorary Palme d'Or for Lifetime Achievement at the Cannes Film Festival and the Satyajit Ray Lifetime Achievement Award at the 54th International Film Festival of India in November 2023.

In 2024, he starred in the Apple TV+ miniseries Franklin, portraying Benjamin Franklin during the eight years that he spent in France attempting to convince King Louis XVI to support the burgeoning United States in the American Revolutionary War.

In July 2025, Douglas said that he was largely retired from acting, saying "I realized I had to stop [...] I did not want to be one of those people who dropped dead on the set". He added that while he was attached to one additional project and did not fully rule out future projects "if something special came up", he had no plans to work regularly again.

== Acting style and reception ==
According to film historian and critic David Thomson, Douglas was capable of playing characters who were "weak, culpable, morally indolent, compromised, and greedy for illicit sensation without losing that basic probity or potential for ethical character that we require of a hero". Critic and author Rob Edelman points out similarities in many of Douglas's roles, writing that in some of his leading films, he personified the "contemporary, Caucasian middle-to-upper-class American male who finds himself the brunt of female anger because of real or imagined sexual slights".

These themes of perceived male victimization are seen in films such as Fatal Attraction (1987) with Glenn Close, The War of the Roses (1989) with Kathleen Turner, Basic Instinct (1992) with Sharon Stone, Falling Down (1993), and Disclosure (1994) with Demi Moore. For his characters in films such as these, "any kind of sexual contact with someone other than his mate and the mother of his children is destined to come at a costly price." Edelman describes his characters as the "Everyman who must contend with, and be victimized by, these women and their raging, psychotic sexuality".

Conversely, Douglas also played powerful characters with dominating personalities, including Gordon Gekko, in the Wall Street franchise, who was described as the "greedy yuppie personification of the Me generation," and says "greed is good" in the movie; in Romancing the Stone and The Jewel of the Nile, he played an idealistic soldier of fortune; in The Star Chamber (1983), he was a court judge fed up with an inadequate legal system, leading him to become involved with a vigilante group; and in Black Rain (1989), he proved he could also play a Stallone-like action hero as a New York City cop.

Having become recognized as a successful producer and actor, he describes himself as "an actor first and a producer second". He has explained why he enjoys both functions:

I love the fact that on one side, with acting, you can be a child—acting is wonderful for its innocence and the fun ... On the other side, producing is fun for all the adult kinds of things you do. You deal in business, you deal with the creative forces. As an adult who continues to get older, you like the adult risks. It's flying without a net, taking chances and learning. I was never good in economics or business—had no business background, you know, and I like it. I think I'm a chameleon. I think it's something that I possibly inherited early on as a child going back and forth between two families. I know that whether it's right or wrong, I have an ability to sort of fit into a lot of different situations and make people feel relatively comfortable in a wide range without giving up all my moral values. I think that same chameleonlike quality can transfer into films. I think if you can remember the reason you got involved with it in the first place and try to keep that impulsive, instinctive feeling even when you're being beaten down or exhausted or waylaid, you'll be successful."

== Acting credits and accolades ==
Over his career he has received two Academy Awards, a BAFTA Award, five Golden Globe Awards, a Primetime Emmy Award, and two Screen Actors Guild Awards. He has also received several honors such as the AFI Life Achievement Award in 2009, two Honorary Césars in 1998 and 2016, a Film Society at Lincoln Center Gala Tribute in 2010, a Golden Globe Cecil B. DeMille Award in 2004, and a Star on the Hollywood Walk of Fame in 2018.

== Personal life ==
=== Marriage and relationships ===
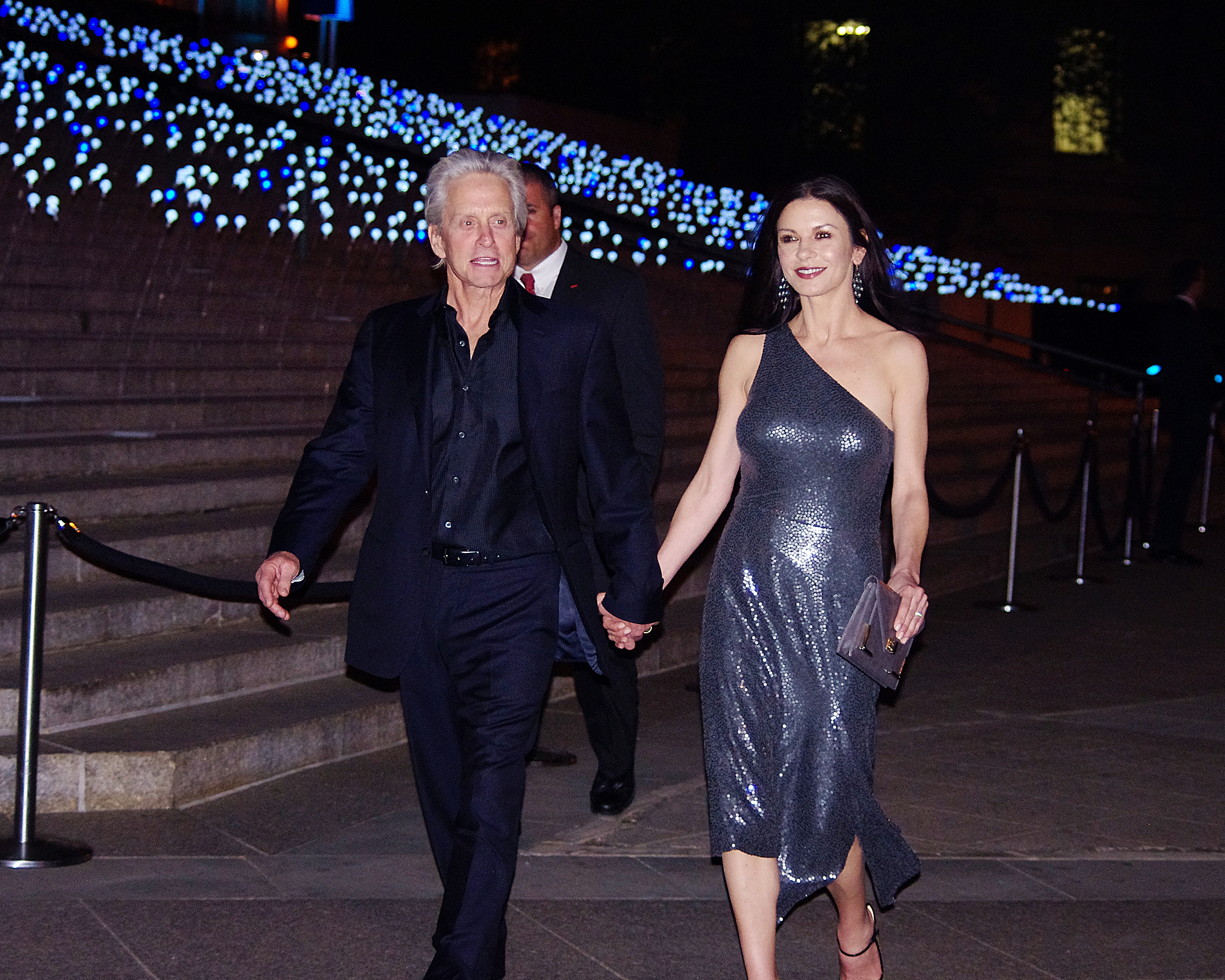
Douglas at a Vanity Fair party with his wife, Catherine Zeta-Jones, in 2012

After the filming of Summertree in 1971, Douglas began dating actress Brenda Vaccaro, a relationship that lasted nearly six years.

In March 1977, Douglas married Diandra Luker, the daughter of an Austrian diplomat. They had one son, Cameron, born in 1978. Douglas said he started a secret relationship with Kathleen Turner while he and Turner were filming Romancing the Stone (1984) and while Douglas was separated from Diandra. In 1995, Diandra filed for divorce and was awarded an estimated settlement of $45 million, plus homes in Beverly Hills and Majorca. Diandra married the 10th Earl of Dartmouth, stepbrother of Diana, Princess of Wales, in 2025.

In March 1999, Douglas began dating Welsh actress Catherine Zeta-Jones. The pair married on November 18, 2000. Zeta-Jones says that when they met in Deauville, France, Douglas said, "I want to father your children." They have two children, son Dylan Michael (born August 8, 2000) and daughter Carys Zeta (born April 20, 2003). The family has a coastal estate near Valldemossa, Mallorca. Douglas and Zeta-Jones own four properties, one in Canada, one in Spain, and two in New York.

In August 2013, People claimed that Douglas and Zeta-Jones began living separately in May 2013, but did not take any legal action towards separation or divorce. A representative for Zeta-Jones subsequently confirmed that they "are taking some time apart to evaluate and work on their marriage". It was reported in November, that the couple had reconciled and Zeta-Jones moved back into their New York apartment.

=== Legal issues ===
In 1997, New York caddie James Parker sued Douglas for $25 million. Parker accused Douglas of hitting him in the groin with an errant golf ball, causing Parker great distress. The case was later settled out of court.

In 2004, Douglas and Zeta-Jones took legal action against stalker Dawnette Knight, who was accused of sending violent letters to the couple that contained graphic threats on Zeta-Jones' life. Testifying, Zeta-Jones said the threats left her so shaken she feared a nervous breakdown. Knight claimed she was in love with Douglas and admitted to the offenses, which took place between October 2003 and May 2004. She was sentenced to three years in prison.

=== Health problems ===
In 1980, Douglas was involved in a serious skiing accident which sidelined his acting career for three years. On September 17, 1992, the same year Basic Instinct came out, he began a 30-day treatment for alcoholism and drug addiction at Sierra Tucson Center.

It was announced on August 16, 2010, that Douglas was suffering from throat cancer (later revealed to have been tongue cancer), and would undergo chemotherapy and radiation treatment. He subsequently confirmed that the cancer was at stage IV, an advanced stage.

Douglas credits the discovery of his cancer to the public Canadian health system when a doctor in Montreal, Quebec diagnosed the actor's medical condition after numerous American specialists failed to do so. Douglas has since participated in fundraisers for Montreal's Jewish General Hospital, where he was diagnosed, and the McGill University Health Centre with which the hospital is affiliated.

Douglas attributed the cancer to stress, his previous alcohol abuse, and years of heavy smoking. In July 2011, Star magazine published photographs which appeared to show him smoking a cigarette while on holiday that month. A representative declined to comment on the photographs.

In November 2010, Douglas's doctors put him on a weight-gain diet due to excessive weight loss that left him weak. On January 11, 2011, he said that the tumor was gone, though the illness and aggressive treatment had caused him to lose 32 pounds (14.5 kg). He said he would require monthly screenings because of a high chance of recurrence within three years. In June 2013, Douglas told The Guardian that his type of cancer is caused by human papillomavirus infection, transmitted by cunnilingus, leading some media to report this as well. His spokesman denied these reports and portrayed Douglas's conversation with The Guardian as general and not referring specifically to his diagnosis.

Although Douglas described the cancer as throat cancer, it was publicly speculated that he may have been diagnosed with oropharyngeal cancer. In October 2013, Douglas said he suffered from tongue cancer, not throat cancer. He announced it as throat cancer upon the advice of his physician, who felt it would be unwise to reveal that he had tongue cancer given its negative prognosis and potential for disfigurement, particularly because the announcement came immediately before Douglas's promotional tour for Wall Street: Money Never Sleeps.

=== Faith and charity work ===
Douglas was born to a Jewish father and an Anglican (Church of England) mother. His cousin, the Right Reverend Nicholas Dill, is the bishop of the established Anglican Church of Bermuda. Douglas was not raised with a religious affiliation, but stated in January 2015, that he now identifies as a Reform Jew. His son, Dylan, had a bar mitzvah ceremony and the Douglas family traveled to Jerusalem to mark the occasion. Douglas has said that his family began lighting Shabbat candles at his son Dylan's request, an experience that he described as spiritually meaningful.

Douglas received the 2015 Genesis Prize, a $1 million prize awarded by the Genesis Prize Foundation for Jewish achievement. He donated the prize money to activities designed to raise awareness about inclusion and diversity in Jewish life and to find innovative solutions to pressing global and community problems.

Michael Douglas has been involved in various charitable activities, focusing on healthcare, nuclear disarmament, and human rights. Since 1998, he has served as a United Nations Messenger of Peace, primarily concentrating on disarmament issues. Douglas has supported the Motion Picture & Television Fund, which aids those in the entertainment industry, and has participated in fundraising efforts for the Jewish General Hospital and the McGill University Health Centre in Montreal, where he was diagnosed with cancer. Additionally, he has been involved with the Elizabeth Glaser Pediatric AIDS Foundation and The Michael J. Fox Foundation for Parkinson's Research. Michael Douglas has also raised awareness about the link between human papillomavirus (HPV) and oropharyngeal cancer, citing medical evidence and his diagnosis to promote public health education and preventive measures. He was featured in the "100 Influential Celebrities in Oncology: The 2023 Edition" by OncoDaily for his contributions to public awareness.

=== Allegations of sexual misconduct ===
In 2018, journalist and author Susan Braudy alleged on Today, an NBC morning news show in the United States, and in several other interviews, that in 1989 when Braudy was in her 40s and working as an assistant to Douglas, he regularly made degrading sexual comments about or to her. She stated this caused her to wear baggy clothing at work, and also recalled a one-on-one script meeting where Douglas allegedly undid his pants and fondled himself with her in the room.

In a preemptive statement, Douglas admitted to using coarse language but categorically denied any other wrongdoing. Zeta-Jones, asked about the allegations while promoting Cocaine Godmother, did not address them directly but said that her husband was "110 percent behind" the #MeToo movement and that she was "very, very happy" with his statement.

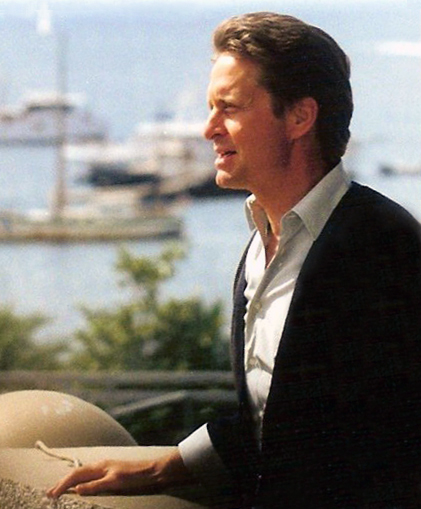
Douglas at the 1987 Cannes Film Festival

== Activism ==
=== Political activities ===
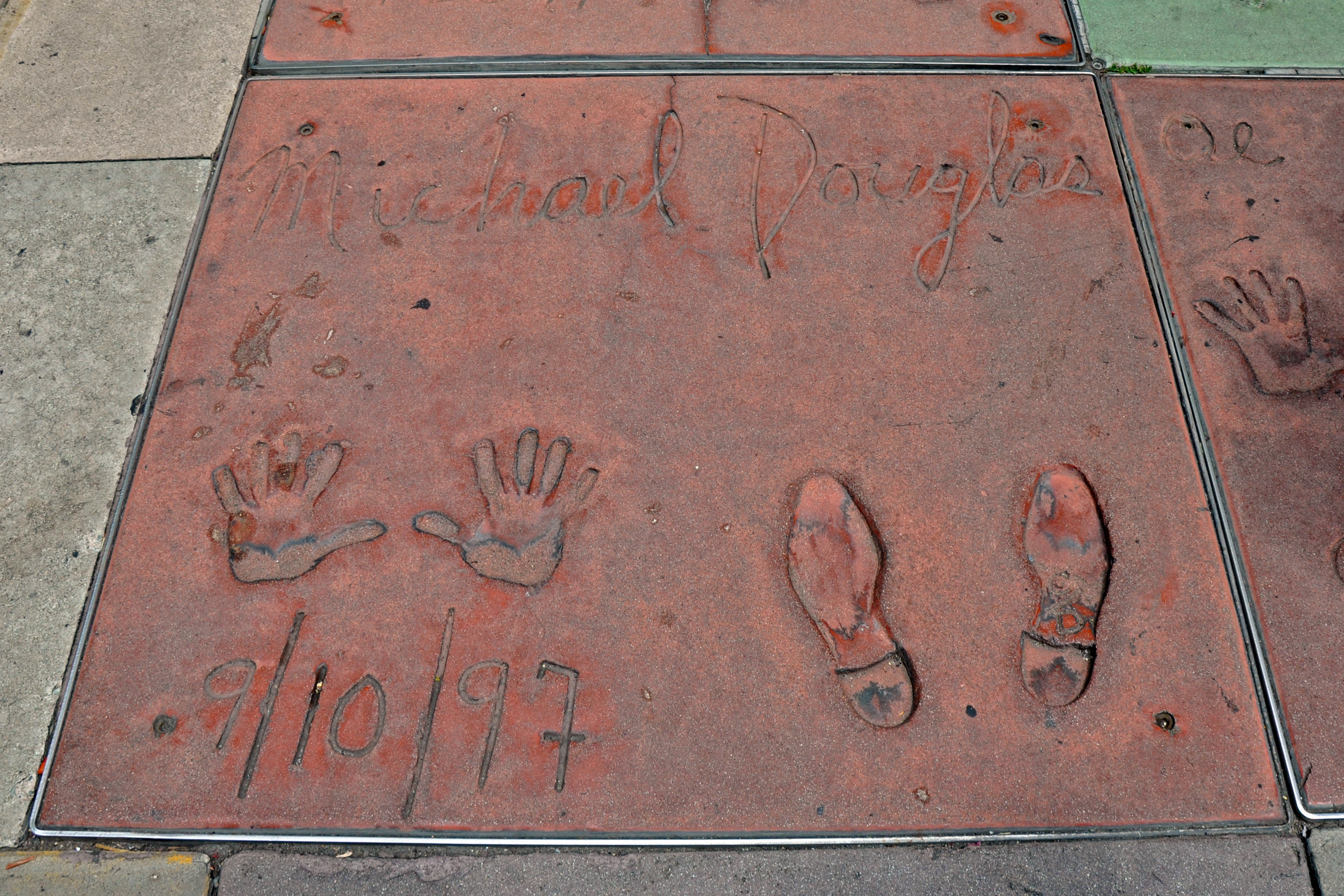
Douglas's hand and footprints at Grauman's Chinese Theatre in Los Angeles

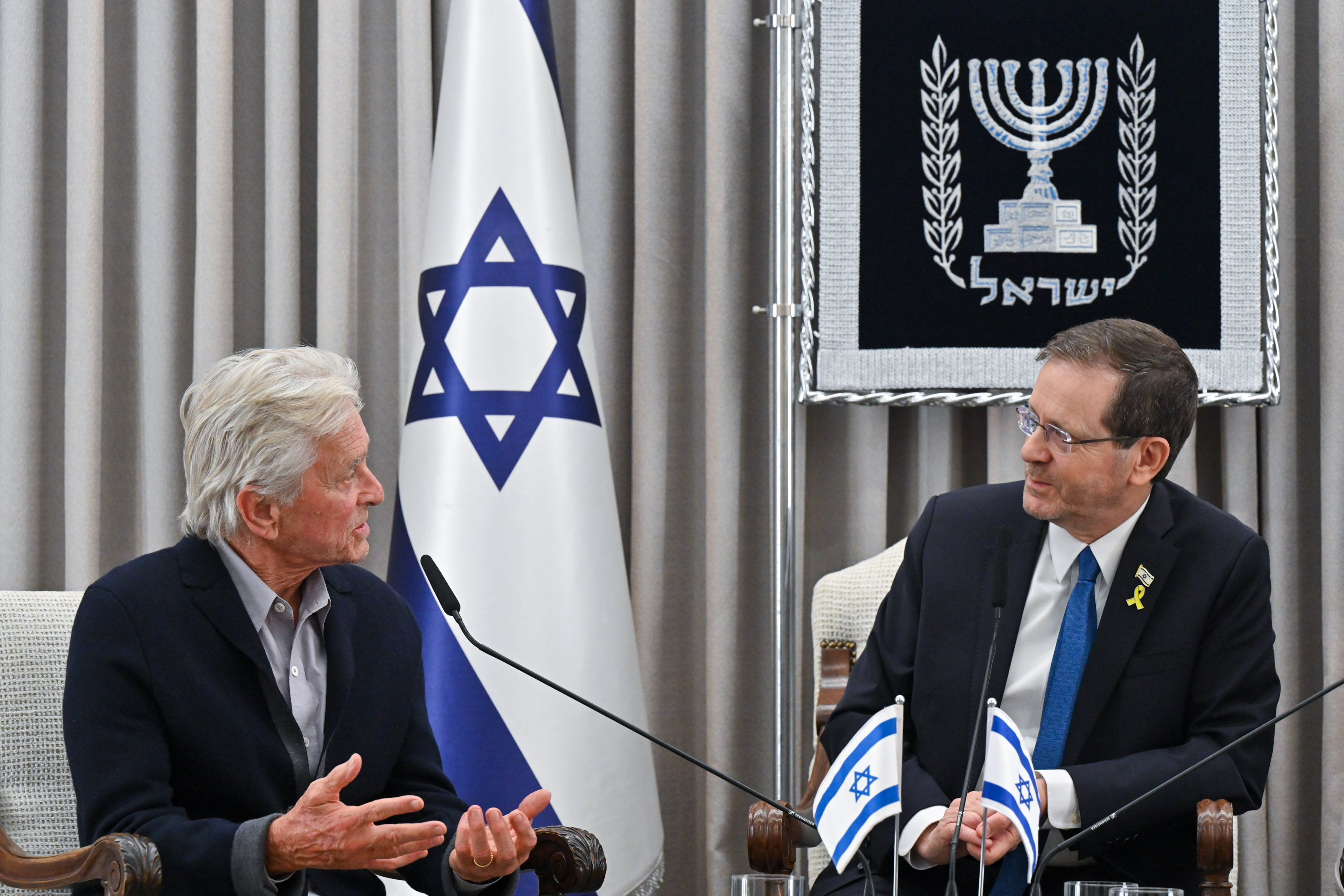
Douglas with Israeli President Isaac Herzog on June 2, 2024

Douglas is a registered Democrat and has donated money to the campaigns of Barack Obama, Christopher Dodd, Al Franken, Edward Markey, Michael Bloomberg, and Joe Biden.

Douglas is a member of the Council on Foreign Relations (CFR). He also a board member of RepresentUs. In 2019, Douglas appeared in a short film for RepresentUs titled Unbreaking America: Divided We Fall. In 2023, Douglas was a key speaker at the American Democracy Summit in Los Angeles.

Douglas is on the board of selectors of the Jefferson Awards for Public Service.

In 2010, Douglas supported a campaign to release Sakineh Mohammadi Ashtiani, an Iranian woman, who, after being convicted of committing adultery in Iran, was sentenced to death by stoning.

In February 2012, following Douglas's return to the character of financial criminal Gordon Gekko, the Federal Bureau of Investigation released a public service announcement video of Douglas calling on viewers to report financial crime.

In August 2014, Douglas was one of 200 public figures who were signatories to a letter to The Guardian opposing Scottish independence in the run-up to September's referendum on that issue.

In October 2023, Douglas signed an open letter expressing support for Israel during the Gaza war. In June 2024, he visited Israel and toured the sites of Be'eri and Nova music festival that were hit by the Hamas-led October 7 attacks. After his tour of the sites, he met with President of Israel Isaac Herzog. During his meeting, Douglas described the participants of the pro-Palestinian protests on university campuses as having undergone "brainwashing… because when you try to talk to many of them, there is no education, there's no knowledge."

In 2023, Douglas served as executive producer and narrator for America's Burning, the political documentary by David Smick which predicts a coming tidal wave of political, social, and economic division in America.

=== Disarmament and gun control ===
Douglas has been a major supporter of gun control since John Lennon was murdered in 1980. Since then Douglas has supported gun safety organizations like Everytown for Gun Safety and the Brady Center to Prevent Gun Violence.

Douglas is an advocate of nuclear disarmament, a supporter of the Nuclear Age Peace Foundation and an advisor and former board member of the nuclear nonproliferation-focused grant making foundation Ploughshares Fund. In 1998, he was appointed UN Messenger of Peace by Secretary-General Kofi Annan.

In 2003, Douglas hosted a "powerful film" on child soldiers and the impact of combat on children in countries such as Sierra Leone. During the documentary film, entitled What's Going On? Child Soldiers in Sierra Leone, Douglas interviewed children, and estimated that they were among 300,000 other children worldwide who have been conscripted or kidnapped and forced to fight. Of one such child he interviewed, Douglas stated, "After being kidnapped by a rebel group, he was tortured, drugged, and forced to commit atrocities." Douglas discussed his role as a Messenger Peace for the UN:

I'm in an enviable position ... When I talk about movies I can talk about messages of peace, and infuse them into the entertainment pages.

In 2006, Douglas was a featured speaker for a United Nations-sponsored conference on the trade of illicit arms, especially of small arms and light weapons. Douglas made several appearances, saying:

The conference is an opportunity for UN member states to build on the Program of Action and to encourage countries to strengthen their laws on the illicit trade, ... an issue that affects us all ... [and] while owning guns is a legal right in most countries, the illegal trade in guns continues to fuel conflict, crime and violence.

In 2009, Douglas joined the project Soldiers of Peace, a movie against all wars and for global peace.

== Philanthropy ==
In a 2016 interview with Town & Country magazine, Douglas described his philanthropic giving as the "sprinkle approach". He has given to over 70 organizations including Memorial Sloan Kettering Cancer Center, the hospital where he was treated for cancer. Douglas is a benefactor and board member of the Perelman Performing Arts Center in New York City and a longstanding board member of the Eugene O'Neill Theater Center in Waterford, CT where he worked for three summers during college. He attended the ribbon-cutting opening ceremony in September 2023. He supports PEN America and has presented awards at the organization's annual galas. In 1999, Douglas funded the establishment of Michael Douglas Pediatric Brain Tumor Research Center at University of California, San Francisco. Douglas is a supporter of the Clinton Global Initiative, part of the Clinton Foundation. In 2023, Douglas voiced the opening film, "Keep Going!" shown at the opening event of the annual meeting. For 12 years, Douglas hosted the Michael Douglas and Friends Celebrity Golf Tournament, raising over $10 million for the Motion Picture & Television Fund. At UC Santa Barbara, he supports the Center for Film, Television, and New Media. He also founded and funds the Michael Douglas Foundation Visiting Artists Program for the Department of Theater and Dance. He serves on the Board of Trustees of The Douglas Foundation which has granted more than $118 million to organizations committed to providing more equitable access to education, healthcare, and the arts. The foundation was founded by his father and stepmother, Kirk and Anne Douglas, in 1964.

== See also ==
- List of actors with Academy Award nominations
- List of actors with Hollywood Walk of Fame motion picture stars
