= Old Devonshire Church =

Coordinates: 32°18′21″N 64°44′41″W

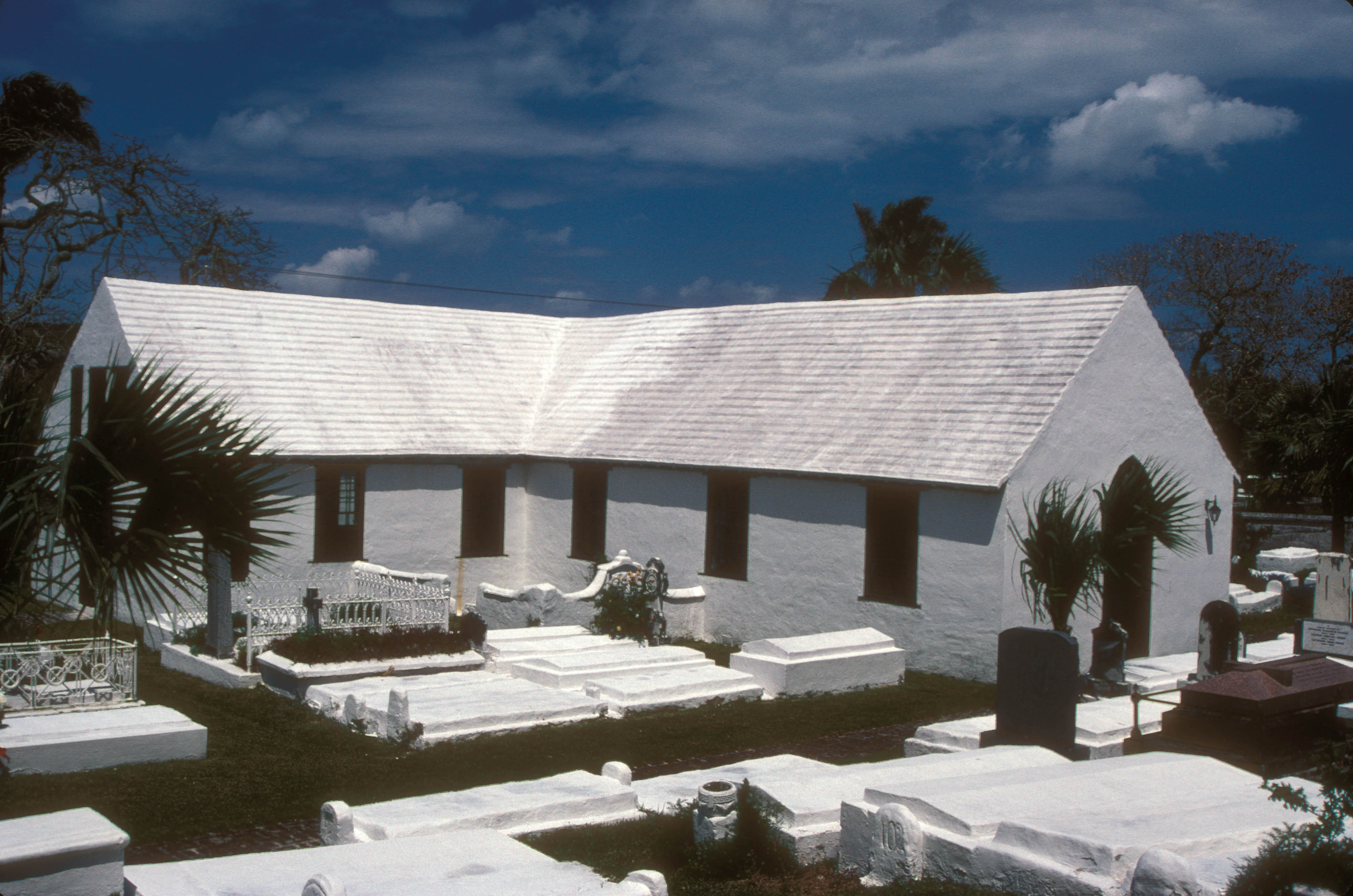
OLD DEVONSHIRE CHURCH, DEVONSHIRE PARISH, BERMUDA

The Old Devonshire Church is an Anglican parish church of Devonshire in Bermuda. It was established in the 1620s but has been rebuilt several times after various disasters. The original church included a ship construction style that reflected original Bermudian architecture informed by the maritime industry endemic to the island. It was destroyed by a hurricane and rebuilt in 1716 and again after a fire in 1970. The present structure is constructed in a cruciform design, with limestone walls and cedar joists.

Throughout its history, the church has been colloquially referred to by several different names including 'Christ Church' and 'Brackish Pond Church,' the latter drawing from one of the earliest settler appellations of Devonshire Parish. Instances of The Royal Gazette (Bermuda) newspaper indicate the 'Brackish Pond Church' designation was used at least through the early 19th century.

The Old Devonshire Church is still operational and holds weekly Sunday services. The church is noted for its local tradition of holding Christmas services by candlelight. An important icon in the church’s history is a silver plate bearing the date of 1590 engraved with the Tudor rose. It is thought to have been brought from England specifically for use in the first church and is possibly the oldest object on the island of Bermuda.

== Features ==
In the adjacent graveyard of the Old Devonshire Church is a hearse house built in 1817 in the same style as the main building. Historically it has included climbing roses, flaming poinsettia plants and old cedars. The interior of the Old Devonshire Parish Church features woodwork of Bermuda cedar for the pulpit, pews, and the altar screen which has carvings of a heart and lilies.

== Notable interments ==
- John Harvey Darrell (1887) Chief Justice of Bermuda
- Henry William Watlington OBE (1959)

== See also ==
- Anglican Church of Bermuda
