= Joel Douglas =

American film producer (born 1947)

- Born: Joel Andrew Douglas; January 23, 1947 (age 79); Los Angeles, California, U.S.
- Occupation: Film producer
- Years active: 1975–2003
- Spouses: Susan Jorgensen (m. 1968; div. 1973) Judith Corso (m. 1975; div. 1981) Patricia Reid-Douglas (m. 1986; div. 2002) Jo Ann Savitt (m. 2004; died 2013) Mascha (m. 2024)
- Parent(s): Kirk Douglas; Diana Douglas
- Relatives: Michael Douglas (brother); Peter Douglas (half-brother); Eric Douglas (half-brother); Thomas Melville Dill (grandfather); Nicholas Bayard Dill (uncle); Cameron Douglas (nephew); Nick Dill (first cousin once removed); Catherine Zeta-Jones (sister-in-law); Kevin Brodie (brother-in-law); Anne Buydens (stepmother)

Joel Andrew Douglas (born January 23, 1947) is an American film producer. The second son of Kirk Douglas and Diana Douglas, he was born one day after his mother's 24th birthday. His paternal grandparents were Jewish immigrants from Gomel in Belarus (then part of the Russian Empire). His mother was from Devonshire Parish, Bermuda; Douglas's maternal grandfather, Lieutenant Colonel Thomas Melville Dill, served as Attorney General of Bermuda and was commanding officer of the Bermuda Militia Artillery.

Joel chose not to follow his father and older brother into acting, opting instead to work behind the camera, producing several films throughout the 1970s and 1980s.

Much of Douglas' work has centered on projects involving his family, including acting as co-producer on The Jewel of the Nile and Romancing the Stone, being an assistant director on One Flew Over the Cuckoo's Nest and in 2003, acting as associate producer on It Runs in the Family, which featured Kirk, Michael and Michael's son Cameron. In the 1970s and 1980s, Douglas worked as an executive for Mel Blanc and Noel Blanc's media company, Blanc Communications Corporation, developing and producing commercials.

== Marriages ==
Joel Douglas has married five times. His first wife was Susan Jorgensen, whom he married in 1968. He married Judith Corso in 1975, then Patricia Reid-Douglas in 1986. His marriage to Jo Ann Savitt, whom he married on February 2, 2004, lasted until her death on November 21, 2013. Savitt was the daughter of bandleader Jan Savitt and his wife, Barbara Ann Stillwell Savitt, the step-daughter of actor Steve Brodie, and the half-sister of Steve's son, actor Kevin Brodie.
