= Thomas Melville Dill =

Bermudian lawyer, politician and soldier

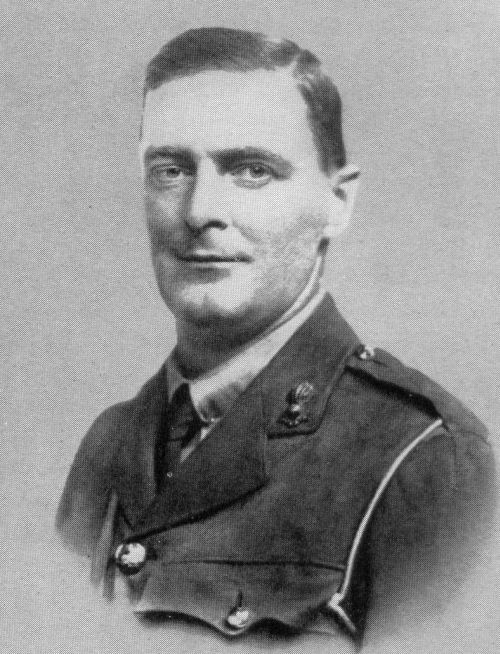
- Born: 23 December 1876; Devonshire Parish, Bermuda
- Died: 7 March 1945 (aged 68)
- Burial place: Devonshire Parish, Bermuda
- Relatives: Ruth Dill, Tommy Dill, Nicholas Bayard Dill, Francis Dill, Diana Dill, Michael Douglas, Joel Douglas, Mary Lea Johnson Richards, John Seward Johnson II, Diana Firestone
- Military career
- Allegiance: United Kingdom; Bermuda
- Branch: British Army
- Service years: 1895–1928
- Rank: Lieutenant-Colonel
- Units: Bermuda Contingent, Royal Garrison Artillery (Bermuda Militia Artillery)
- Conflicts: First World War
- Awards: Officer of the Order of the British Empire

Lieutenant-Colonel Thomas Melville Dill OBE (23 December 1876 – 7 March 1945) was a prominent Bermudian lawyer, politician, and soldier.

== Early life ==
Dill was born in his parents' home, "Snug Corner", in Devonshire Parish, in the British Imperial fortress colony of Bermuda, the son of Mary Lea (née Smith) and Thomas Newbold Dill. The Dill family had been established in Bermuda in the 1630s. "Snug Corner" (now called "Seabright"), which had been built by Josiah Cox in 1755, had been inherited by Thomas Newbold Dill (related to the Cox family via his maternal grandmother Mary Smith, born Mary Newbold) along with other properties, and is close to "Newbold Place", where Thomas Newbold Dill's mother, Harriet Vaulk Dill (born Harriet Vaulk Smith) had been living with her widowed mother at the time of her marriage (the Newbold family had been established in Bermuda in the 17th Century, when James Newbold and Godheard Newbold were recorded there, and thrived in Southampton Parish and Devonshire Parish through the 18th Century. The name is scarce in Bermuda today, though many families, including the Talbot Brothers, descend from Newbolds).

Thomas Newbold Dill (1837–1910) was a merchant, a Member of the Colonial Parliament (MCP) for Devonshire Parish from 1868 to 1888, a Member of the Legislative Council and an Assistant Justice from 1888, Mayor of the City of Hamilton from 1891 to 1897, served on numerous committees and boards, and was a member of the Devonshire Church (Church of England) and Devonshire Parish vestries (the latter is now termed a Parish Council).

Thomas Melville Dill was named for his seafaring paternal grandfather, who had lost his master's certificate after the wreck of the Bermudian-built Cedrine on the Isle of Wight, which had been returning the last convict labourers from the Royal Naval Dockyard in Bermuda to Britain in 1863.

== Military career ==
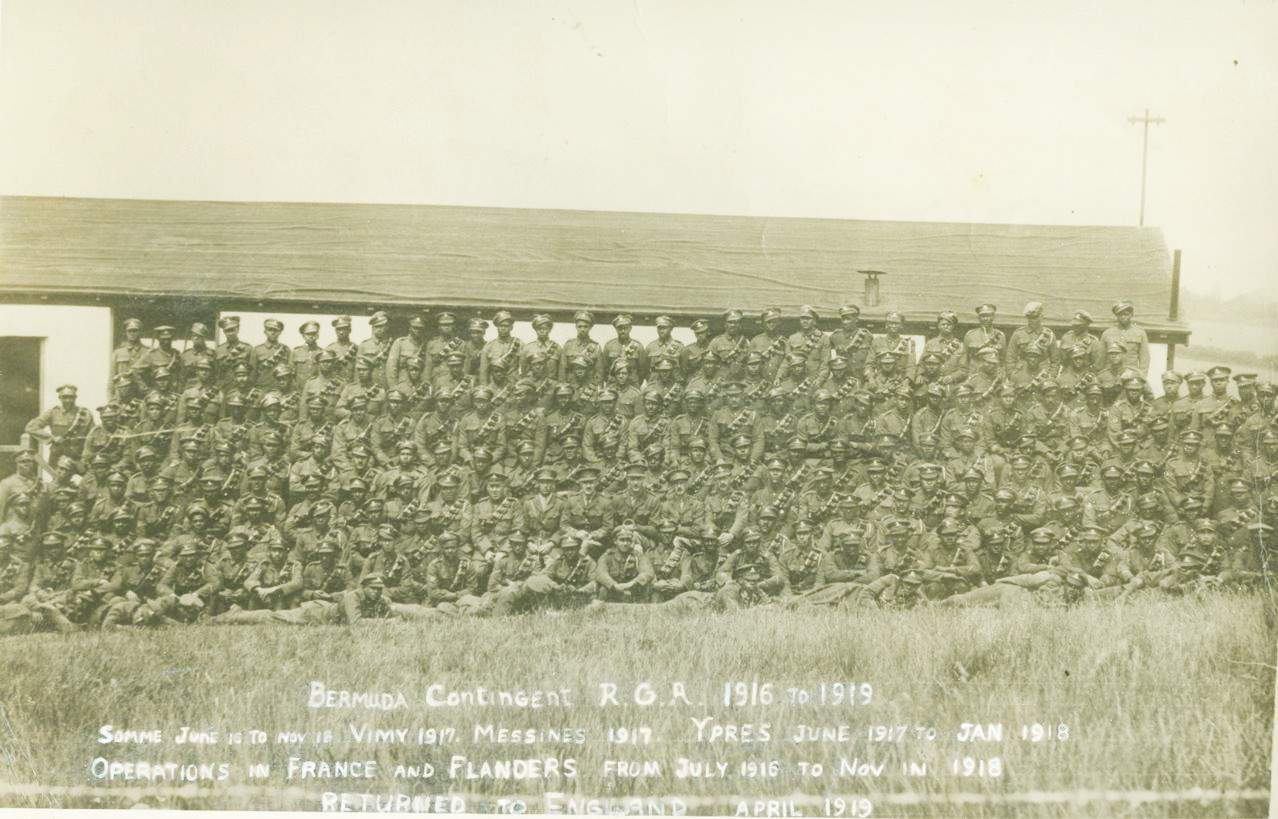
The Bermuda Contingent of the Royal Garrison Artillery

Thomas Dill entered the fledgeling Bermuda Volunteer Rifle Corps in 1895 as a rifleman, before transferring to the Bermuda Militia Artillery, a reserve of the Royal Regiment of Artillery, as a lieutenant. The British Army maintained a large Bermuda Garrison of regular and part-time artillery and infantry units to guard the Royal Naval Dockyard, and other strategic assets in the Imperial fortress colony.

By 1914, then-Captain Dill was the acting Commandant, but he handed that position to a subordinate to lead the unit's First Contingent to the Western Front, receiving a temporary regular commission as a Major.

Serving as part of the larger Royal Garrison Artillery draft to the front, the Bermudian contingent was strongly praised by Field Marshal Douglas Haig.

After the war, Major Dill returned to Bermuda, resuming his command of the BMA. His substantive rank was still Captain until he was promoted to substantive Major in 1921, though dated 12 November 1919. He retired on 21 April 1928 with the honorary-rank of lieutenant-colonel (substantive rank of major).

== Legal and political careers ==
In addition to his role as a military officer, Dill pursued a legal career, becoming Bermuda's Attorney General.

He entered politics, and served as a Member of the Colonial Parliament (MCP) for Devonshire parish from 1904 until 1938. He was also appointed to the Executive Council. He was an avid historian, whose articles were published in the Bermuda Historical Quarterly.

== Personal life ==
Dill married Ruth Rapalje Neilson (1880–1973) on 15 October 1900, residing at "Newbold Place" from 1905, and they had several children, some of whom followed him to positions of prominence in Bermuda or abroad. Their children were Ruth Rapalje Dill (1901–1986), Thomas Newbold Dill (1903–1970), Sir Nicholas Bayard Dill (known as Bayard Dill) (1905–1993), Laurence Dill (1907–1984), Frances Rapalje Dill (1915–2009) and Diana Dill (1923–2015).

Bayard Dill was an officer in the Bermuda Volunteer Engineers, a founding member of the Conyers, Dill & Pearman law firm (that played an important role in Bermuda's development as an offshore business centre), and a prominent politician who was knighted in 1951. He also played a key role in negotiating the agreement with the US for its military and naval bases in Bermuda during the Second World War.

Ruth Dill was married to John Seward Johnson I, heir to the Johnson & Johnson fortune. Their children included Mary Lea Johnson Richards, John Seward Johnson II, and Diana Firestone. Diana Dill moved to the US, becoming an actress. She was married to actor Kirk Douglas, with whom she had two sons, actor and producer Michael Douglas, and producer Joel Douglas. His great grandson, the Right Reverend Nicholas Dill (of the Anglican Church of Bermuda), was installed as Bishop of Bermuda on 29 May 2013.

== Death ==
Dill died of a heart attack on 7 March 1945, following injuries sustained during a fall in February, at age 68. He was eulogised on the front page of The Royal Gazette.
