= In the Wings =

In the Wings may refer to:

- In the Wings (Froman book), a book by Kyle Froman
- In the Wings (horse), a Thoroughbred racehorse
- In the Wings (play), a play by Stewart F. Lane
- In the Wings: A Memoir, a book by Diana Douglas
