= The Cowboys (TV series) =

- Main cast screenshot
- Genre: Western
- Starring: Jim Davis; Belinda Balaski; Moses Gunn; Walter Brooke; Robert Carradine; A Martinez
- Theme music composer: John Williams
- Opening theme: Open Prairies
- Ending theme: Open Prairies (instrumental)
- Composer: Harry Sukman
- Country of origin: United States
- Original language: English
- No. of seasons: 1
- No. of episodes: 12

Production
- Running time: 30 minutes
- Production company: Warner Bros. Television

Original release
- Network: ABC
- Release: 6 February – 8 May 1974

The Cowboys is an American Western television series based on the 1972 motion picture of the same name. It aired on the American Broadcasting Company (ABC) television network from February 6 to May 8, 1974. The series starred Jim Davis, Diana Douglas, Moses Gunn, A Martinez, Robert Carradine and Clay O'Brien. David Dortort produced the series. The television show followed the exploits of seven boys who worked on a ranch in 1870s New Mexico.

The Cowboys was conceived as an hour-long series, but ABC decided to reduce the running time to a half-hour format. The format change did not lead to increased viewers, and the show was the victim of early cancellation. As a traditional television Western, it was an aberration compared to most television trends of the 1970s (as most had ended production several years prior, and only Gunsmoke was still in production by then).

Guest stars included Cal Bellini as Wa-Cha-Ka in "The Indian Givers", Kevin Hagen as Josh Redding in "Death on a Fast Horse", and Lurene Tuttle as Grandma Jesse in "Many a Good Horse Died".

== Cast ==
- Diana Douglas as Annie Andersen
- Jim Davis as Marshal Bill Winter
- Moses Gunn as Jebediah Nightlinger
- A Martinez as Cimarron (Cowboy)
- Robert Carradine as Slim (Cowboy)
- Sean Kelly as Jimmy (Cowboy)
- Kerry MacLane as Homer (Cowboy)
- Clint Howard as Steve (Cowboy)
- Mitch Brown as Hardy (Cowboy)
- Clay O'Brien as Weedy (Cowboy)

== Guest stars ==
Each guest star made only one appearance.

- Ted Gehring as Eben Graff
- DeForest Kelley as Jack Potter
- Cal Bellini as Wa-Cha-Ka
- Kevin Hagen as Josh Redding
- Lurene Tuttle as Grandma Jesse
- Stafford Repp as Army Captain
- Ian Wolfe as Padre
- John McKee as Foley
- Walter Brooke as Reager
- John Carradine as Oscar Schmidt
- Jack Perkins
- Pippa Scott as Chief

== Episodes ==
The following is a list of episodes.

No.	Title	Directed by	Written by	Original release date
1	"David Done It"	Unknown	Unknown	February 6, 1974
2	"Death on a Fast Horse"	Unknown	Unknown	February 13, 1974
3	"The Long Rider"	Unknown	Unknown	February 20, 1974
4	"Many a Good Horse Died"	Unknown	Unknown	February 27, 1974
5	"The Avengers"	Unknown	Unknown	March 6, 1974
6	"The Accused"	Unknown	Unknown	March 13, 1974
7	"A Matter of Honor"	Unknown	Unknown	March 20, 1974
8	"The Ordeal"	Unknown	Unknown	March 27, 1974
9	"The Remounts"	Unknown	Unknown	April 3, 1974
10	"The Trap"	Unknown	Unknown	April 10, 1974
11	"The Indian Givers"	Unknown	Unknown	May 1, 1974
12	"Requiem for a Lost Son"	Unknown	Unknown	May 8, 1974
