= National Lampoon's Adam & Eve =

- Promotional poster for National Lampoon's Adam & Eve
- Directed by: Jeff Kanew
- Written by: Justin Kanew
- Produced by: Martin E. Caan; Charley Cabrera; Jeff Kanew
- Starring: Cameron Douglas; Emmanuelle Chriqui; George Dzundza
- Cinematography: John Darbonne
- Edited by: Jeff Kanew
- Distributed by: New Line Cinema
- Release date: November 4, 2005
- Running time: 91 minutes
- Country: United States
- Language: English

National Lampoon's Adam & Eve, also known simply as Adam & Eve, is a 2005 American sex comedy film, released as part of the ongoing series of National Lampoon films. The film is directed by Jeff Kanew and stars Cameron Douglas, Emmanuelle Chriqui, George Dzundza and others.

== Plot ==
Adam is a college senior and an aspiring singer/songwriter. He meets Eve, a beautiful, bright student and talented sports still photographer. They begin dating and Adam is surprised to learn that Eve is still a virgin because she does not wish to have sex until it feels right for her.

== Cast ==
- Cameron Douglas as Adam
- Emmanuelle Chriqui as Eve
- Chad Lindberg as Freddie
- Jake Hoffman as Ferguson
- Brian Klugman as Munch
- Branden Williams as Billy
- Courtney Peldon as Patty
- China Shavers as Sarah
- Lisa Wilhoit as Katie Wilson
- Terri Garber as Eve's mother
- Allan Havey as Adam's father
- George Dzundza as Eve's father
- Brianna Brown as Cindy
- Joshua Wade as Miles
- Gary Brockette as Miles' boss
