= It Runs in the Family (2003 film) =

2003 film by Fred Schepisi

- Theatrical release poster
- Directed by: Fred Schepisi
- Written by: Jesse Wigutow
- Produced by: Michael Douglas; Marcy Drogin; Jesse Wigutow
- Starring: Michael Douglas; Kirk Douglas; Cameron Douglas; Diana Douglas; Rory Culkin; Bernadette Peters
- Cinematography: Ian Baker
- Edited by: Kate Williams
- Music by: Moose Charlap; Paul Grabowsky; Charles F. Sweeney Jr.
- Production companies: Metro-Goldwyn-Mayer Pictures; Buena Vista International; Furthur Films
- Distributed by: MGM Distribution Co. (United States); Buena Vista International (International)
- Release date: April 25, 2003
- Running time: 109 minutes
- Country: United States
- Languages: English; Hebrew; Spanish
- Box office: $8.2 million

It Runs in the Family is a 2003 American comedy drama film directed by Fred Schepisi and written by Jesse Wigutow. Following a dysfunctional wealthy New York Jewish family, the film is notable for starring three generations of the Douglas family: Kirk Douglas, his son Michael Douglas, and Michael's son Cameron Douglas, who play three generations of a family. Diana Douglas (née Dill), real life mother to Michael Douglas and ex-wife of Kirk, plays Kirk's character's wife. Joel Douglas, second son of Kirk and Diana, was the associate producer. This was the final film appearance of Diana Douglas before her retirement from acting and subsequent death on July 3, 2015 at the age of 92 years.

It Runs in the Family was released in the United States by MGM Distribution Co. and internationally by Buena Vista International on April 25, 2003. The film received negative reviews from critics and grossed $8.2 million.

== Plot ==
The story involves the highly successful New York City Gromberg family. Each member has their own set of problems. The father–son relationship difficulties are highlighted. Mitchell Gromberg is dealing with health problems resulting from a stroke. His son Alex works as a lawyer in the firm that his father founded, but he questions the usefulness of his work and his place in the family. Alex's son, Asher, does not take college seriously and seems lost. The youngest son is 11 year old Eli, who is extremely intelligent, while being socially awkward and is entering a difficult pre-adolescent time.

Alex indulges in a thoughtless and careless brief romantic fling with Suzie at the soup kitchen where they volunteer. Psychologist wife Rebecca discovers panties and it threatens their marriage. When Evelyn Gromberg, Mitchell's wife and Alex's mother dies, the family comes together to heal. At Evelyn's funeral in suburban New York, Rebecca tells Alex that she knows about his romantic fling. Alex, Mitchell and Asher go fishing to talk about old wounds but nothing gets resolved.

At college Asher is discovered with illegal drugs. Although devastated, Rebecca and Alex are supportive parents and vow to get help for Asher. He wants his girlfriend Peg protected. Mitchell's older brother Stephen dies. Alex and Mitchell give him a fine send-off and farewell. Back at home Alex is forced to sleep on the living room couch but Rebecca agrees to reconciliation terms.

== Cast ==
- Michael Douglas as Alex Gromberg
- Kirk Douglas as Mitchell Gromberg, Alex's father
- Cameron Douglas as Asher Gromberg, Alex & Rebecca's first son
- Rory Culkin as Eli Gromberg, Alex & Rebecca's second son
- Diana Douglas as Evelyn Gromberg, Alex's mother
- Michelle Monaghan as Peg Maloney, Asher's girlfriend
- Bernadette Peters as Rebecca Gromberg, Alex's wife
- Geoffrey Arend as Malik
- Sarita Choudhury as Suzie
- Irene Gorovaia as Abby Staley
- Annie Golden as Deb
- Mark Hammer as Stephen Gromberg, Mitchell's older brother and Alex's paternal uncle
- Audra McDonald as Sarah Langley
- Josh Pais as Barney
- Louie Torrellas as Jeremy
- Adrian Martinez as Mitchell's Doorman

== Production ==
In his role as producer, Michael Douglas suggested his mother (Diana Dill), Rory Culkin, and Bernadette Peters for their roles. Fred Schepisi noted that they were originally considering Sigourney Weaver for the part of Michael's wife. "Bernadette [Peters] was a really nice balance, playing straighter than you’d usually see her play..."

During pre-production the project changed title several times, including the title Smack the Puss.

Total gross was $7,491,839.

== Reception ==
On Rotten Tomatoes, the film has an approval rating of 30%, based on 97 reviews, and an average rating of 4.5/10. The site's consensus states, "Despite its gimmick casting, the movie ultimately goes nowhere." Metacritic, which uses a weighted average, assigned the film a score of 44 out of 100, based on 28 critics, indicating "mixed or average" reviews.

Critic Steven Holden wrote in The New York Times that the film is a "surprisingly complex and subtle portrait", and "Besides its laudable reluctance to tie up loose ends, the most courageous thing about It Runs in the Family is its refusal to try to make you love its aggressive, strong-willed characters." Roger Ebert wrote: "But the movie is simply not clear about where it wants to go and what it wants to do. It is heavy on episode and light on insight, and although it takes courage to bring up touchy topics it would have taken more to treat them frankly."

== See also ==
- List of films featuring diabetes
