= Ewen Ratteray =

Alexander Ewen Ratteray (born 18 February 1942, Somerset, Bermuda) is an Anglian bishop who was the Bishop of Bermuda from 1996 to 2008.

Born on 18 February 1942 and educated at Codrington College, Barbados, he was ordained in 1966. After a curacy in Pontefract he began to proceed in Church ordained ministries: being successively Vicar of Airedale then Archdeacon of Bermuda before his translation to the episcopacy in 1996. He retired on 31 March 2008.

Ratteray became the first Bermudian to serve as Bishop and the first black Anglican Bishop in Bermuda.

Church of England titles
Preceded by Thomas Dyson	Archdeacon of Bermuda; 1994–1996	Succeeded by Arnold Hollis
Preceded by Bill Down	Bishop of Bermuda; 1996–2007	Succeeded by Patrick White
