= Diana Douglas =

Bermudian-American actress (1923–2015)

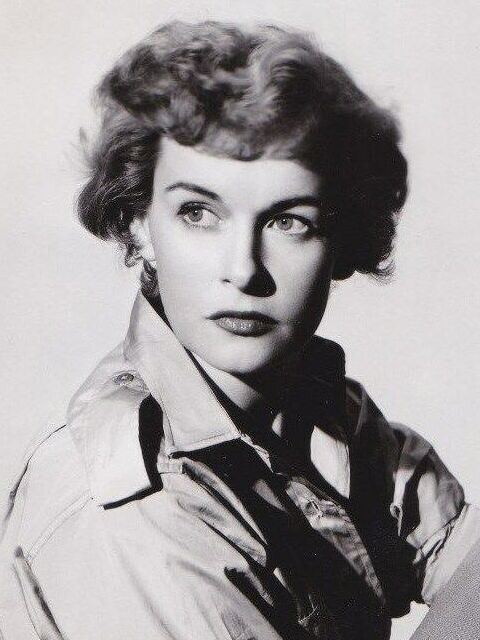
- Douglas in 1950
- Born: Diana Love Dill; January 22, 1923; Devonshire, Bermuda
- Died: July 3, 2015 (aged 92); Los Angeles, California, U.S.
- Occupation: Actress
- Years active: 1942–2008
- Spouses: Kirk Douglas (m. 1943; div. 1951); Bill Darrid (m. 1956; died 1992); Donald Webster (m. 2002)
- Children: Michael Douglas; Joel Douglas
- Father: Thomas Melville Dill
- Relatives: Nicholas Bayard Dill (brother); Cameron Douglas (grandson); Nick Dill (great-nephew)

Diana Love Webster (née Dill; formerly Douglas and Darrid; January 22, 1923 – July 3, 2015), known professionally as Diana Douglas, was a Bermudian-American actress who was married to actor Kirk Douglas from 1943 until their divorce in 1951. She was the mother of Michael and Joel Douglas.

Douglas began her career as an actress in 1942, and ultimately appeared in more than 50 films. Two of her best-known roles were Susan Rogers in The Indian Fighter (co-starring Kirk Douglas) and Peg in Planes, Trains and Automobiles. She was also known for her recurring role as Martha Evans in Days of Our Lives (1977–1979, 1982). In 2003, she appeared in It Runs in the Family with her ex-husband Kirk, her son Michael and her grandson Cameron. She retired from acting in 2008.

== Early life ==
Douglas was born on January 22, 1923, in Devonshire, Bermuda. Her father, Lieutenant Colonel Thomas Melville Dill (also the name of her great-grandfather, a mariner), was a former Member of the Colonial Parliament (MCP) (representing the Parish of Devonshire in the Parliament of Bermuda), Attorney General of Bermuda, and former Commanding Officer of the Bermuda Militia Artillery. Her mother Ruth Rapalje (née Neilson) had roots in New Jersey, including being a descendant of American Revolutionary War hero Col. John Neilson. Douglas' brother Bayard was a prominent lawyer and politician. Her sister Ruth was married to John Seward Johnson I, heir to the Johnson & Johnson fortune. Douglas' father was from a prominent Bermudian family, present on the island since the early 17th century.

Her ancestry included English, Irish, Welsh, Dutch, Scottish, Belgian, and French. Douglas was brought up in the Church of England.

== Career ==
In 1942, she began her career in a minor, uncredited role in Keeper of the Flame. She went on to appear in many films during the 1950s and 1960s, one of her most notable roles arguably being Susan Rogers in The Indian Fighter. During the 1960s and 1970s, she appeared in a variety of television programs (such as the General Electric Theater and Naked City), her best known television role being Lily Chernak Donnelly on Love Is a Many Splendored Thing.

She played Poco on Three Steps to Heaven and Martha Evans in Days of Our Lives. Following the cancellation of Love Is a Many Splendored Thing, she played Annie Andersen in The Cowboys. She appeared in Roots: The Next Generations and The Waltons. In It Runs in the Family, Douglas appeared with her former husband, Kirk Douglas, son Michael and grandson Cameron, and later appeared on an episode of CBS's Cold Case and in the Season 15 ER episode "Heal Thyself" (2008), the year that she retired from acting.

In 1999, her autobiography, In the Wings: A Memoir, was published.

== Personal life ==
Diana Dill was first married to Kirk Douglas. They met as acting students before he went to fight in WW2. During the war, Douglas was serving in the U.S. Navy when he saw the May 3, 1943, issue of Life magazine, with a photograph of Dill on the cover. He showed the cover to his shipmates and told them that he would marry her. They married in November 1943, and had two sons, Michael and Joel, before divorcing in 1951.

Douglas then married actor Bill Darrid, and they lived with her sons on the East Coast of the U.S. until his death in 1992. In 2002, at age 79 she married Donald Webster in the old Devonshire parish church in Bermuda.

== Death ==
On July 3, 2015, Douglas, a breast cancer survivor, died at the Motion Picture & Television Country House and Hospital in Woodland Hills, Los Angeles, of an undisclosed form of cancer at the age of 92.

== Filmography ==
=== Film ===
Year	Title	Role	Notes
1943	Keeper of the Flame	Forward American Girl	Uncredited
1947	The Late George Apley	Sarah	Uncredited
1948	Let's Live Again	Terry	
1948	The Sign of the Ram	Catherine Woolton	
1949	House of Strangers	Elaine Monetti	
1949	The Whistle at Eaton Falls	Ruth Adams	a.k.a. Richer Than the Earth (UK)
1952	Storm Over Tibet	Elaine March Simms	a.k.a. Mask of the Himalayas (USA: alternative title) a.k.a. Sturm über Tibet (West Germany)
1952	Monsoon	Julia	
1955	The Indian Fighter	Susan Rogers	
1970	Loving	Mrs. Shavelson	
1975	Dead Man on the Run	Meg	TV movie
1977	Tail Gunner Joe	Sarah	TV movie
1977	Alexander: The Other Side of Dawn	Clara Duncan	TV movie
1977	Billy: Portrait of a Street Kid	Mrs. Bedford	TV movie
1977	Mary White	Jane Addams	TV movie
1977	Another Man, Another Chance	Mary's mother	
1978	Night Cries	Mrs. Thueson	TV movie
1978	A Fire in the Sky	Mrs. Rearden	TV movie
1981	Jaws of Satan	Evelyn Downs	a.k.a. King Cobra
1982	Sister, Sister	Rhoda	TV movie
1983	The Star Chamber	Adrian Caulfield	
1987	Planes, Trains and Automobiles	Peg	
1991	Cold Heaven	Mother St. Agnes	
1992	A Town Torn Apart	Mrs. Fenn	TV movie aka Doc: The Dennis Littky Story
2003	It Runs in the Family	Evelyn Gromberg	

=== Television ===
Year	Title	Role	Notes
1949	Photocrime		
1950	Masterpiece Playhouse		Episode: "The Rivals"
1950	The Web		Episode: "Key Witness"
1951	Kraft Television Theatre		Episode: "Mr. Mergenthwirker's Lobblies"
1952	Armstrong Circle Theatre		Episode: "Mr. Bemiss Takes a Trip"
1953	Studio One		Episode: "Greed" aka Studio One Summer Theatre (summer title) a.k.a. Studio One in Hollywood (new title) a.k.a. Summer Theatre (summer title) a.k.a. Westinghouse Studio One a.k.a. Westinghouse Summer Theatre (summer title)
1953	Robert Montgomery Presents		Episode: "Element of Risk"
1953	Medallion Theatre		Episode: "The Decision at Arrowsmith"
1953	Three Steps to Heaven	Mary Claire "Pogo" Thurmond Morgan #2	
1953	Willys Theatre Presenting Ben Hecht's Tales of the City		Episode: "Count Bruga"
1955	General Electric Theater	Nora	Episode: "The Seeds of Hate" aka G.E. Theater (USA: informal short title)
1956	Medic	Edith Martin	Episodes: "Reach of the Giant: Part 1", "Reach of the Giant: Part 2"
1956	Science Fiction Theatre	Elaine Conover / Jane Brandon	2 episodes
1956	West Point	Mrs. Jan Willis	Episode: "Officer's Wife"
1956–1957	Robert Montgomery Presents	Carla Major; Mrs. Whitton-Betty	Episode: "Goodbye, Grey Flannel"; Episode: "Wait for Me"
1959	Armstrong Circle Theatre	Mrs. Donald Jewkes	Episode: "Miracle at Spring Hill"
1959	Naked City	Meg Peters / Hilda Wallace	2 episodes
1964	Flipper	Mrs. Granville	Episode: "The Second Time Around"
1965	For the People	Bernice Brandon	Episode: "The Influence of Fear"
1965	Ben Casey	Martha English	Episode: "War of Nerves"
1967	N.Y.P.D.	Mrs. Whitaker	Episode: "The Boy Witness"
1970–1973	Love Is a Many Splendored Thing	Lily Chernak Donnelly	
1973	Hawkins	Clara Guilfoyle	Episodes: "Die, Darling, Die," "A Life for a Life"
1973	Kung Fu	Sister Richardson	Episode: "The Tong"
1974	The Streets of San Francisco	Mrs. Adele Sloane	Episode: "Chapel of the Damned"
1974	The Cowboys	Annie Andersen	
1974–1975	Cannon	Mrs. Foxworth; Alice Parks	Episode: "The Avenger" (1974); Episode: "The Deadly Conspiracy" (1975)
1975	Barnaby Jones	Alice Parks	Episode: "The Deadly Conspiracy: Part 2"
1977	Lou Grant	Norma Cardell	Episode: "Hoax"
1979	Roots: The Next Generations	Mrs. Andy Warner	1 episode
1979	The Waltons	Mrs. Denman	Episodes: "The Journal", "The Violated", "The Waiting"
1980	Knots Landing	Dr. Charlotte Kramer	2 episodes
1981, 1984	Dynasty	Mother Blaisdel	3 episodes
1981	Nero Wolfe	Sarah Rackham	Episode: "In the Best Families"
1981	CHiPs	Vera Baricza	Episode: "The Hawk and the Hunter"
1982	Lou Grant	Carole Fuller	Episode: "Review"
1982	Remington Steele	Hannah Dillon	Episode: "Tempered Steele"
1983	Cagney & Lacey	Blanche	Episode: "The Gang's All Here"
1983	Dallas	Dr. Suzanne Lacey	Episode: "The Letter"
1984	Scarecrow and Mrs. King	Evelyn McGuire	Episode: "I Am Not Now, nor Have I Ever Been... a Spy"
1985–1986	The Paper Chase	Professor Tyler	17 episodes
1986	Hardcastle and McCormick	Frances	Episode: "Hardcastle for Mayor"
1987	Beauty and the Beast	Margaret Chase	Episode: "Song of Orpheus"
1993	Dark Justice	Mrs. Collins	Episode: "My Dinner with Nick"
1993	Harts of the West	Betty	Episode: "Jake's Brother"
2004	The West Wing	Libby Lassiter	Episode: "The Stormy Present"
2007	Cold Case	Mrs. Valentine '07	Episode: "Devil Music"
2008	ER	Bertha Mendenhall	Episode: "Heal Thyself", (final appearance)

== Books ==
- Dougan, Andy (2001). Michael Douglas: Out of the Shadows : the Unauthorised Biography. London: Robson. ISBN 978-1-86105-347-3. OCLC 48026343.
- Douglas, Diana (1999). In the Wings: A Memoir. New York: Barricade Books. ISBN 978-1-56980-151-2. OCLC 41086793.
- Parker, John (2011). Michael Douglas: Acting on Instinct. Headline. ISBN 978-0-7553-6286-8.
