= Anne Buydens =

American film producer and philanthropist (1919–2021)

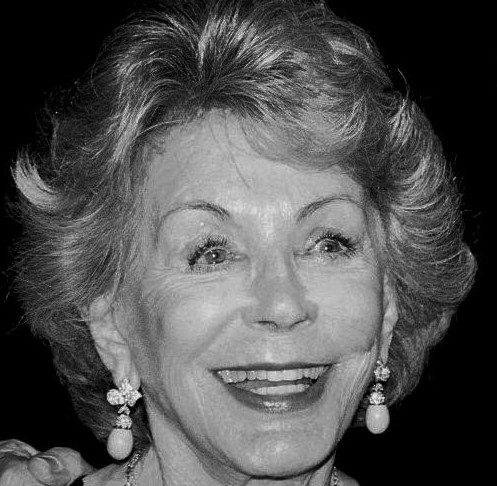
- Buydens in 2003
- Born: Hannelore Marx; April 23, 1919; Hanover, Prussia, German Reich
- Died: April 29, 2021 (aged 102); Beverly Hills, California, U.S.
- Resting place: Westwood Village Memorial Park Cemetery
- Other name: Anne Douglas
- Occupations: Philanthropist; producer
- Years active: 1952–2013
- Spouses: Albert Buydens (divorced); Kirk Douglas (m. 1954; died 2020)
- Children: Peter Douglas; Eric Douglas
- Relatives: Michael Douglas (stepson); Joel Douglas (stepson)
- Awards: Jefferson Award (2003)

Anne Buydens (/ˈbaɪdənz/ BY-dənz; born Hannelore Marx; April 23, 1919 – April 29, 2021) was a German-born American philanthropist and film producer. She was the wife of actor Kirk Douglas from 1954 until his death in 2020. She received a Jefferson Award for Public Service in 2003.

== Early life ==
Buydens was born Hannelore Marx in Hanover, Weimar Republic (now Germany), on April 23, 1919, the daughter of Siegfried Marx, a textile merchant who imported silk for making parachutes, and Paula Marx, a socialite. After her parents were divorced, she was sent to a boarding school in Switzerland, where she learned English, French and Italian. She later studied in Brussels but fled the bombed city for Paris during World War II. As her German identity was a problem, she became a Belgian citizen by marrying a Belgian, Albert Buydens, whom she later divorced.

== Career ==
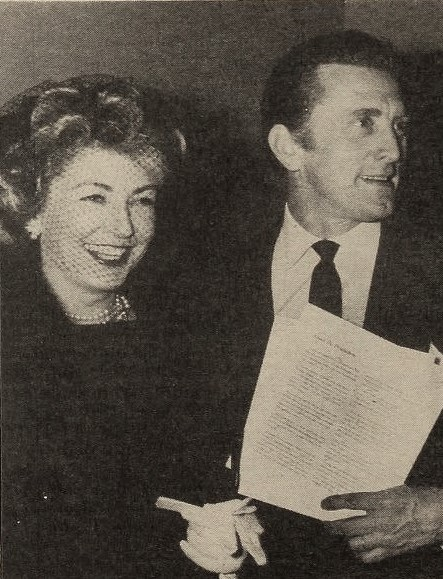
With Kirk Douglas in 1959

When the Nazis in Paris insisted that films be shown with German subtitles, her language skills allowed her to find a job adding subtitles for a French film distributor. In 1948, she was hired to produce an NBC program, Paris Cavalcade of Fashion. She also worked as a location scout on the 1952 production of Moulin Rouge for John Huston. From 1953, she scheduled celebrity parties at the Cannes Film Festival.

When Buydens met Kirk Douglas in Paris in 1953, he was divorced from his first wife, Diana Dill, with whom he had two sons, Michael and Joel. They worked on the film Act of Love, directed by Anatole Litvak, he as an actor and she as a publicist. He offered her a job as his publicist, which she first refused, but eventually accepted, described by him later: "She finally agreed to work with me on a trial basis, making it clear our relationship would be strictly business".

== Personal life ==
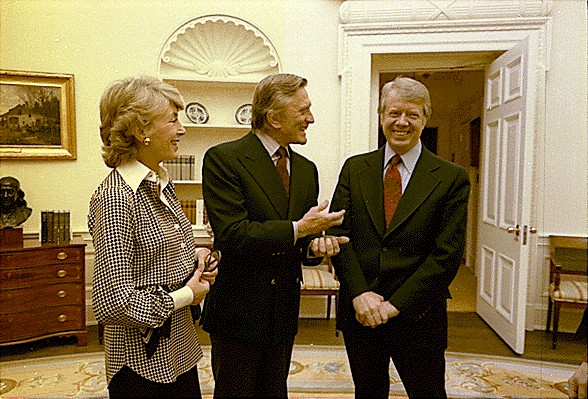
In the Oval Office with Douglas and President Jimmy Carter in 1978.

Buydens and Douglas married in Las Vegas on May 29, 1954. The couple had two sons: Peter (born 1955) and Eric (1958–2004), who both went into the film business. Douglas credited Buydens with saving his life in 1958 when she had insisted that he not travel via private plane with director Mike Todd; the plane crashed the next day, killing all four people aboard.

Buydens became a United States citizen in 1959. She converted to Judaism when she renewed her wedding vows with Douglas on their 50th wedding anniversary in 2004.

In 2017, they co-wrote a memoir, Kirk and Anne: Letters of Love, Laughter, and a Lifetime in Hollywood, including letters they had exchanged. She and her husband both became centenarians; he died aged 103 on February 5, 2020.

=== Death ===
Buydens died on April 29, 2021, aged 102, at her Beverly Hills home. She was interred at the Westwood Village Memorial Park Cemetery next to her husband and their son Eric.

In a statement released by the family, her stepson Michael Douglas paid tribute:

Anne was more than a stepmother, and never "wicked." She brought out the best in all of us, especially our father. Dad would never have had the career he did without Anne's support and partnership.

== Philanthropy ==
One of Buydens' first forays into philanthropy came on the heels of recovering from breast cancer: With six fellow survivors, Buydens established the "Research for Women's Cancers" charity, which raised millions of dollars to help finance a research facility at Cedars-Sinai Medical Center.

The two started the Douglas Foundation in 1964, which has since donated roughly 118 million USD to institutions such as the Children's Hospital Los Angeles and the Motion Picture & Television Fund (MPTF). They were also behind the establishment of Harry's Haven, an Alzheimer's disease unit named after Douglas's father at the MPTF Home in Woodland Hills.

The couple was known for their efforts to rebuild playgrounds in the Los Angeles Unified School District, attending opening ceremonies in person. In recognition of her compassion toward homeless women, the Anne Douglas Center for Women was named after her.

== Awards ==
Buydens was inducted into the International Best-Dressed Hall of Fame List in 1970.

In recognition of her philanthropic deeds as a private citizen, Buydens received a Jefferson Award for Public Service in 2003. Buydens and Douglas are the only married couple to have each received an individual Jefferson Award; Douglas was awarded in 1983.
