= Irina Gorovaia =

American actress (born 1989)

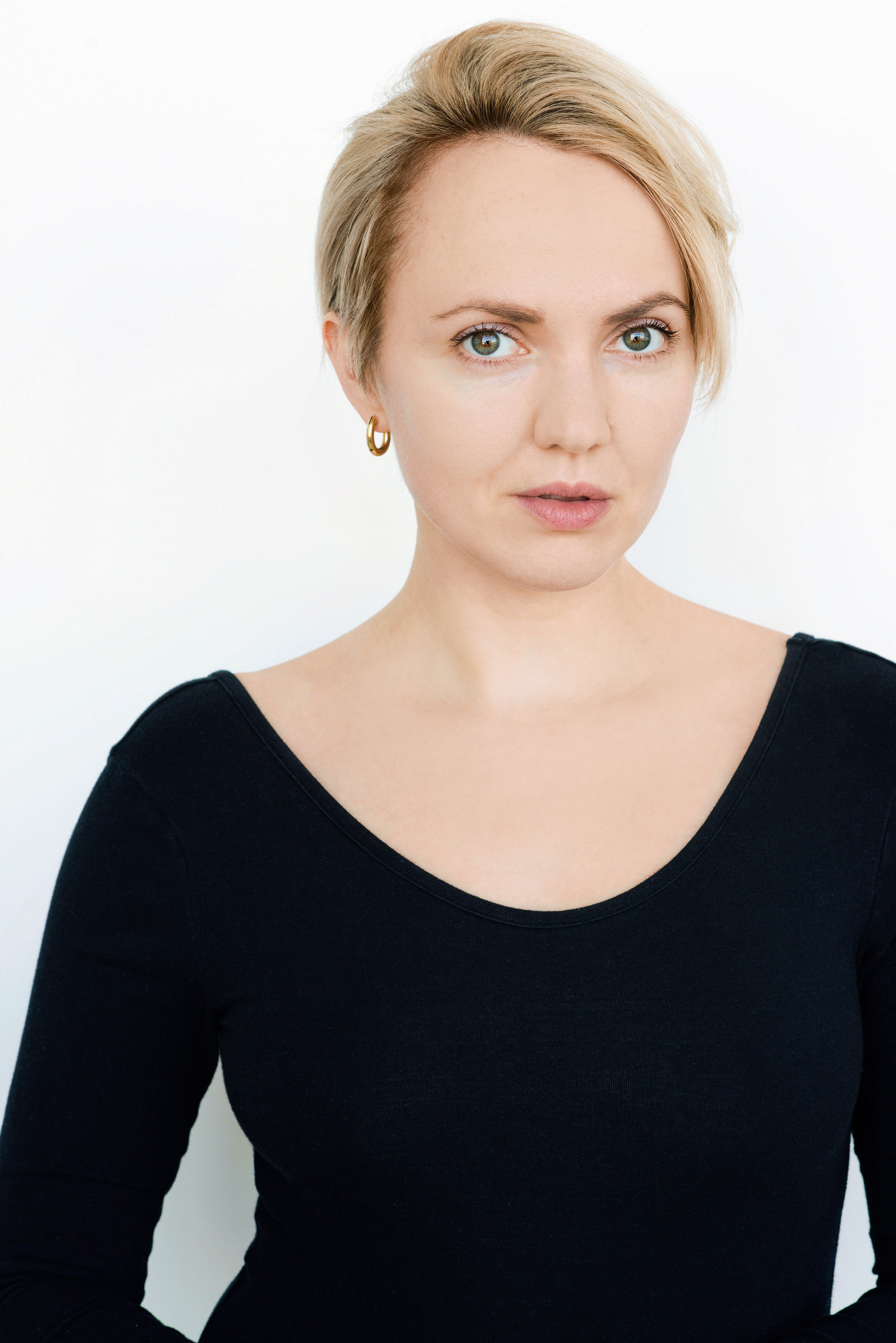
- Born: June 13, 1989 (age 36); Leningrad, Russian SFSR, Soviet Union
- Years active: 2001–present
- Website: www.irinagorovaia.com

Irina Gorovaia (Russian: Ирина Горовая; born June 13, 1989), also credited as Irene Gorovaia, is an American actress and dancer.

== Early life ==
Irina Gorovaia was born on June 13, 1989, in Leningrad, Soviet Union (now St. Petersburg, Russia). She was raised in Brooklyn, New York. She has been a ballet dancer for many years, training with the School of American Ballet. Gorovaia also studied drama at LaGuardia Arts High School. She performed in The Nutcracker with the New York City Ballet in 2000.

== Career ==
She began her film career in Touchstone Pictures' The Royal Tenenbaums (2001), in the role of Young Margot Tenenbaum, for which she was nominated for a Young Artist Award for Best Performance in a Feature Film, Supporting Young Actress in 2002. Gorovaia was subsequently cast in films It Runs in the Family (2003) and The Butterfly Effect (2004). In 2016, she won Best Supporting Actress for her role in After the Outbreak at The Endless Mountain Film Festival and was nominated for Best Actress at The Nice International Film Festival in 2017.

== Filmography ==
Film roles
| Year | Title | Role | Notes |
|---|---|---|---|
| 2001 | The Royal Tenenbaums | Young Margot Tenenbaum | |
| 2003 | It Runs in the Family | Abby Staley | |
| 2004 | The Butterfly Effect | Kayleigh Miller at 13 | |
| 2015 | Mortal Kombat Fates Beginning | Sonya Blade | Short film |
| 2017 | After the Outbreak | | |
| 2017 | Boarding School | Hilary | |
| 2019 | A Magnificent Gray | Carmen | Short film; also producer |

Television roles
| Year | Title | Role | Notes |
|---|---|---|---|
| 2012 | Winners | Irina | Television film |
| 2015 | Cold Bloods | Jill | Episode: "Battle Ground" and "Double Take Down" |
| 2016 | The Swipers | Daphne | Episode: "Sea of Men" |
| 2016 | The Box | Margot / Herself | Television film |
