= Eric Douglas =

American actor and comedian (1958–2004)

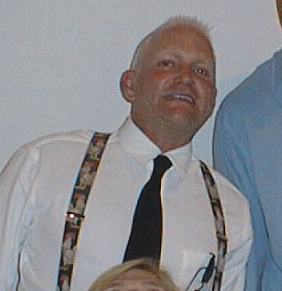
- Douglas in 1995
- Born: Eric Anthony Douglas; June 21, 1958; Los Angeles, California, U.S.
- Died: July 6, 2004 (aged 46); New York City, U.S.
- Occupations: Actor, stand-up comedian
- Years active: 1971–2004
- Parent(s): Kirk Douglas; Anne Buydens
- Relatives: Peter Douglas (brother); Michael Douglas (half-brother); Joel Douglas (half-brother); Cameron Douglas (half-nephew)

Eric Anthony Douglas (June 21, 1958 – July 6, 2004) was an American actor and stand-up comedian. He was the youngest son of actor Kirk Douglas and his second wife Anne Buydens. His eldest half-brother is actor and producer Michael Douglas. Douglas pursued a career in show business but did not attain the same level of success as his father and brothers. His career was overshadowed by his numerous run-ins with the law and problems with alcohol and drugs.

He died of a drug overdose on July 6, 2004 at the age of 46.

== Early life and education ==
Douglas was born in Los Angeles, California, the youngest son of actor Kirk Douglas (1916–2020) and German American mother Anne Buydens (1919–2021). His father was Jewish and his mother later converted to Judaism. He was the younger brother of Peter Douglas, and his older half-brothers are Michael and Joel Douglas.

Douglas studied at Pitzer College in Claremont, California, and RADA and LAMDA, both in London.

== Career ==
=== Acting ===
Douglas made his screen debut in 1971 in A Gunfight, starring his father and Johnny Cash. In 1982, Douglas appeared in the NBC television film Remembrance of Love, also starring his father. Douglas portrayed a younger version of his father's character in flashback scenes. He appeared in several films in the 1980s including The Flamingo Kid (1985), Tomboy (1985), The Golden Child (1986), and Honor Bound (1988). In the late 1980s, Douglas performed off-Broadway at the Village Gate Theater with the critically acclaimed improvisational comedy troupe Noo Yawk Tawk . He also appeared in a production of Dale Wasserman's Shakespeare and The Indians at the Music Theatre Conference for the Eugene O' Neill Theatre Center in 1981. Also in the production was folk performer Bobby Bridger, but the production never made it to Broadway.

In 1991, Douglas appeared with his father (in the senior Douglas's Emmy-nominated performance) in "Yellow", the Season 3 finale of the television series Tales from the Crypt. The father and son acting duo portrayed father and son characters with Eric a young officer in World War I brought up on charges of cowardice by his commanding general who is also his cold-hearted father.

=== Stand-up comedy ===
In the early 1990s, Douglas attempted a career as a stand-up comedian. He performed in New York City comedy clubs with much of his self-deprecating material coming from his status as the black sheep of the Douglas dynasty.

Douglas entered British comedy folklore when, during a stand-up performance at The Comedy Store, London, he was angered by the audience's reaction to his stand-up routine. In a moment that would lead to club co-founder Don Ward saying he had "died on his arse", Douglas shouted "You can't do this to me, I'm Kirk Douglas's son!" A member of the audience then stood up and shouted, "No, I'm Kirk Douglas' son," referring to the iconic "I'm Spartacus" scene of the 1960 film starring Kirk Douglas. This ended up with the majority of the audience standing up and repeating the line.

== Personal life ==
=== Legal issues ===
Douglas was arrested multiple times throughout the 1990s. One of his first arrests came in 1991 for kicking a Beverly Hills police officer. On October 30, 1994, Douglas was arrested in Los Angeles for cocaine possession. Less than a month later, he was arrested for DUI and for leaving the scene of an accident when he crashed into a parked car while trying to leave The Comedy Store in West Hollywood after a fight. In May 1996, Douglas was arrested for possession of a controlled substance when police found eleven vials of crack cocaine and 1,085 Xanax pills in his Hell's Kitchen, Manhattan apartment. He pleaded guilty to the charges and was placed on probation and was ordered to complete a drug rehab program.

In August 1996, he was arrested in Long Beach, California, for driving under the influence of drugs and alcohol. Two days later, Douglas was arrested in New Canaan, Connecticut, for disorderly conduct after he attempted to kiss a young girl who was a fellow patient at Silver Hill Hospital, a rehab facility he was in at the time. He was cleared of the charges in February 1998. In February 1997, Douglas was arrested for DUI after crashing his rental car into two parked cars.

=== Drug issues ===
In 2000, Douglas revealed in an interview that he went into an eight-day coma in 1999 after accidentally overdosing on Xanax. Douglas recalled, "I was in L.A. sitting around my breakfast table with my dad and I choked on a piece of sausage. But because the pills had taken effect, I was not able to dislodge the sausage from my throat." After the Douglases' maid attempted the Heimlich maneuver, Douglas was taken to Cedars-Sinai Medical Center where he fell into a coma. Due to an anoxic brain injury, his speech became slurred and his gait was altered.

In May 2001, Douglas sued his former psychiatrist, Dr. William Leader, claiming that Leader prescribed him a combination of prescription drugs that are lethal when combined with alcohol. Douglas asserted that Leader, who had been treating Douglas for his drug addictions for ten years, failed to consider his alcohol problem when he prescribed Vicodin, Klonopin, and Xanax. Douglas claimed the drugs caused him to feel suicidal and also caused an episode of cardiac arrest which led him to require constant care and hospitalization. Douglas sought $50,000 in damages from Leader.

Weeks before his death, Douglas was back in a rehab center in Upstate New York. His parents reportedly visited him and gave him a tough love ultimatum regarding his drug use.

In 2009, during an appearance on The Early Show, Kirk Douglas told interviewer Julie Chen Moonves that he and his wife had taken Eric to "20 rehab centers" over the years and that "nothing helped".

== Death ==
On July 6, 2004, a maid found Douglas' body in his Manhattan apartment. An autopsy and toxicology report later determined that his death was caused by "acute intoxication" from the combined effects of alcohol, tranquilizers, and painkillers. Douglas' death was ruled accidental. He was 46 years old. He was interred in Pierce Brothers Westwood Village Memorial Park and Mortuary in the Westwood section of Los Angeles, California. His father was later interred with him after his death in 2020 and his mother was interred with them after her death in 2021.

== Filmography ==
Year	Title	Role	Notes
1971	A Gunfight	Bud Tenneray	
1979	The White Shadow	Student	Episode: "Albert Hodges"
1979	The Spy Who Did It Better	Bellboy	
1982	Remembrance of Love	Young Joe Rabin	TV movie
1984	The Flamingo Kid	Donny	
1985	Tomboy	Ernie Leeds Jr.	
1986	The Golden Child	Yellow Dragon	
1987	Student Confidential	Johnny Warshetsky	
1987	Highway to Heaven	Rhett Clark	Episode: "Playing for Keeps"
1988	La belle Anglaise	Eric	Episode: "Une vie de chien"
1988	Honor Bound	Lamarr	
1991	Delta Force 3: The Killing Game	Sam	
1991	Tales from the Crypt	Lt. Martin Kalthrob	Episode: "Yellow"
1993	The Alaska Kid	Eric	Miniseries
2001	Circuit Surgery	Eric	Short
2007	The Words Left Unsaid	Mordor	Short, (final film role); Released posthumously
