= In the Wings: A Memoir =

1999 book by Diana Douglas

- Author: Diana Douglas
- Language: English
- Genre: Memoir
- Publisher: Barricade Books
- Publication date: 1999
- Publication place: United States

In the Wings: A Memoir is a 1999 book written by American actress Diana Douglas. In the book, she accused her first husband, film star Kirk Douglas, of being a drug addict. She revealed in the book, as well, that she had an affair with Errol Flynn. Kirk Douglas called her a "Blabbermouth" after the book came out.
