= Arthur Browne (bishop) =

British Anglican bishop (1864–1951)

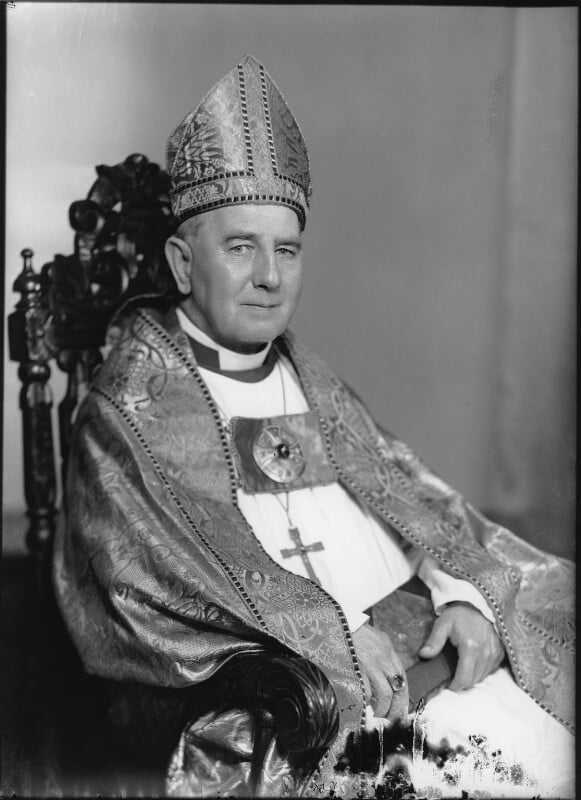
Browne in 1937

Arthur Heber Browne (1864 – 10 June 1951) was the inaugural Bishop of Bermuda.

Born in 1864 and educated at St Edmund Hall, Oxford, he was ordained in 1887. After a curacy at Berkeley, Gloucestershire he was appointed the Vicar of Northleach in 1890. He then served the Anglican Church in Canada before a lengthy spell as Missioner within the Diocese of Exeter. His final post (before his appointment to the episcopate) was at the united parish of St Michael and All Angels with All Saints, Paddington. A colourful character, he died on 10 June 1951.

Church of England titles
New title	Bishop of Bermuda; 1925 –1948	Succeeded by John Jagoe
