= Bishop of Bermuda =

Anglican-Church-of-Bermuda Bishop

The Bishop of Bermuda is an episcopal title given to the ordinary of the Anglican Church of Bermuda, one of six extra-provincial Anglican churches within the Church of England overseen by the Archbishop of Canterbury. The present Bishop is Nick Dill.

From the date of official colonisation in 1612 (three years after Bermuda had been settled by the wreck of the Sea Venture, the survivors of which included the Reverend Richard Buck, who carried out the first Church of England services in Bermuda) until 1825, the nine parishes of the Church of England in Bermuda had rarely enough ministers, and there was no local Bishop, and indeed no colonial bishop, until Charles Inglis became the first Bishop of the Diocese of Nova Scotia (covering present-day New Brunswick, Newfoundland, Nova Scotia, Prince Edward Island and Quebec) in 1787. From 1825 to 1839, Bermuda was attached to the Diocese of Nova Scotia and Prince Edward Island. Subsequently, Newfoundland and Bermuda were separated as the Diocese of Newfoundland, with Aubrey George Spencer as the first Bishop. Although both Bermuda and Newfoundland were parts of British North America, they were left out of the 1867 Confederation of Canada, when the other North American colonies formed the Dominion of Canada. Newfoundland would itself become a dominion (the Dominion of Newfoundland) in 1907 (though reverting to a colony in 1934).

The Synod of the Church of England in Bermuda was formed in 1879, and a Diocese of Bermuda became separate from the Diocese of Newfoundland, but they continued to be grouped under the Bishop of Newfoundland and Bermuda until 1919, when Newfoundland and Bermuda each received its own Bishop.

== List of the Bishops of Bermuda ==
Tenure	Incumbent	Notes
1925 to 1948	Arthur Heber Browne	(1864–1951)
1949 to 1956	John Arthur Jagoe	(1889–1962).
1956 to 1962	Anthony Lewis Elliott Williams	(1892–1975).
1963 to 1970	John Armstrong	(1905–1992).
1970 to 1976	Eric Joseph Trapp	(1910–1993).
1976	Robert Wright Stopford	(1901–1976)
1977 to 1982	Anselm Genders	(1919–2008)
1983	no appointment	
1984 to 1989	Christopher Charles Luxmoore	(1926–2014)
1990 to 1996	William John Denbigh Down	(1936–2025)
1996 to 2008	Ewen Ratteray	(b. 1942)
2009 to 2012	Patrick White	(b. 1943)
2013 to present	Nick Dill	(b. 1963)
