= Conyers Dill & Pearman =

Offshore law firm

Conyers
- Headquarters: Hamilton, Bermuda
- No. of offices: 6
- No. of lawyers: 130
- Major practice areas: Banking & Finance, Corporate & Commercial, Dispute Resolution, Employment Law, Investment Funds, Private Client & Trusts, Property, Regulatory, Restructuring & Insolvency
- Date founded: 1928
- Company type: Law firm
- Website: https://www.conyers.com/

Conyers is an international law firm. Their client base includes FTSE 100 and Fortune 500 companies, international finance houses and asset managers. The firm advises on law practiced in Bermuda, British Virgin Islands and the Cayman Islands. Conyers Headquarters is situated in Hamilton, Bermuda and has international offices in Hong Kong, London and Singapore.

== History ==
Founded in Bermuda in 1928 (although it can trace its roots back to 1903), the firm has subsequently opened legal practices in a number of other offshore financial centers, including the British Virgin Islands (1996) and the Cayman Islands (2004). It also has offices in key financial centers, including London (1998), Hong Kong (1985) and Singapore (2001). It is a member of the offshore magic circle. Conyers' expansion has been entirely by way of organic growth, rather than by the acquisition of smaller firms in the jurisdictions in which it wishes to operate. The firm can claim to be the first offshore firm to operate in multiple jurisdictions; the original Bermudian firm opened a British Virgin Islands office in 1996.

The firm's founder, Reginald Conyers, played an important role in the development of the nascent financial services industry in Bermuda in the 1920s and 1930s. Following on from the Bermuda Railway Company Act 1924, Conyers faced a legal problem of conveying huge numbers of land parcels by the company. Firstly, he took on two partners in his practice, Bayard Dill and James Pearman (and thus the firm was officially born). Secondly, in 1935 the firm was instrumental in the enactment of the first "exempt company" legislation in Bermuda, which led some to claim that Bermuda was the world's first offshore financial center. Later, in 1957, another partner of the firm, David Graham, laid the basis for the development of Bermuda as a domicile for ship registrations in a letter to The Times. In 2019, the firm became the subject of the Mauritius Leaks and related investigations carried forth by the International Consortium of Investigative Journalists and its partners.

== Awards and accolades ==
Conyers is a member of Lex Mundi, a large association of independent law firms.

Conyers was recognized as Band 1 by Chambers & Partners in 2018.

Conyers was recognized as a Top Tier Firm by IFLR1000 for 2018, and by Legal 500 Caribbean 2018.
