= Nicholas Bayard Dill =

Bermudian politician, lawyer and military officer

Sir Nicholas Bayard Dill

Member of the Colonial Parliament for Devonshire North
- Succeeded by: Dame Lois Browne-Evans

Personal details
- Born: 28 December 1905 Devonshire Parish, Bermuda
- Died: 10 September 1993 (aged 87) Bermuda
- Spouse: Lucy Clare Watlington
- Children: 2
- Occupation: Legislator, lawyer, soldier

Sir Nicholas Bayard Dill CBE (28 December 1905 – 10 September 1993), known as Bayard Dill, was a prominent Bermudian politician, lawyer and military officer.

== Early life ==
Bayard Dill was born on 28 December 1905, at Newbold Place, his parents' home in Devonshire Parish, Bermuda. His father, Thomas Melville Dill (1876–1945), was a prominent Bermudian lawyer, politician and soldier, who would serve as the Commanding Officer of the Bermuda Militia Artillery, a Member of the Colonial Parliament (MCP) for Devonshire, and Attorney General of Bermuda.

His mother, born Ruth Rapalje Neilson (1880–1973), was a native of New Jersey. The Dill family had been prominent in Bermuda since the 1630s. His paternal grandfather, Thomas Newbold Dill (1837–1910), was a merchant, a Member of the Colonial Parliament (MCP) for Devonshire Parish from 1868 to 1888, a Member of the Legislative Council and an Assistant Justice from 1888, Mayor of the City of Hamilton from 1891 to 1897, served on numerous committees and boards, and was a member of the Devonshire Church (Church of England) and Devonshire Parish vestries (the latter is now termed a Parish Council).

== Legal and political career ==
Bayard Dill followed his father into law as a barrister, completing a law degree at the University of Cambridge and being admitted to the bar at Middle Temple, London, in 1926, and the Supreme Court of Bermuda in 1927. He was a founding member in the 1930s of the Conyers Dill & Pearman law firm (that played an important role in Bermuda's development as an offshore business centre). He also became a prominent politician, the MCP for Devonshire North from 1938 until he was defeated as an incumbent in the 1963 election by Lois Browne-Evans. He was also appointed to HM Executive Council of Bermuda on 23 August 1944.

Bayard Dill played a key role in negotiating the agreement with the US for its military and naval bases in Bermuda during the Second World War, which were granted to the US free for ninety-nine years as part of the Destroyers for Bases Agreement (although Britain received no destroyers in exchange for the bases in Bermuda). Some of the land procured by the US for building the Naval Operating Base had belonged to the Dill family.

== Military career ==
Bayard Dill also served as a military officer, receiving a commission into the Bermuda Volunteer Engineers (BVE) as a second-lieutenant dated 31 May 1934. The BVE had been formed in 1931 to operate search lights at Bermuda's coastal artillery batteries (the guns being operated by the BMA) due to the 1928 withdrawal from Bermuda of the Royal Engineers fortress company previously tasked with that role. In 1937, it also absorbed the signals section of the Bermuda Volunteer Rifle Corps, providing signals detachments to other units of the Bermuda Garrison. Dill was promoted to lieutenant on 31 May 1937. The first commanding officer of the BVE was Captain H. D. (later Sir Harry) Butterfield, and the second-in-command was Lieutenant Cecil Montgomery-Moore, DFC. In 1932, Butterfield retired, and Montgomery-Moore succeeded him. Lieutenant Bayard Dill became the new second-in-command. He was promoted to Acting-Captain on 12 July 1940, and to Temporary-Captain on 12 October. He relinquished his commission on 23 August 1944.

== Private life ==
Bayard Dill's siblings included Ruth Rapalje Dill, Thomas Newbold Dill, Laurence Dill, Helen Dill, Frances Rapalje Dill, and Diana Dill.

Ruth Dill was married to John Seward Johnson I, heir to the Johnson & Johnson fortune. Diana Dill, moved to the US, becoming an actress, and was married to actor Kirk Douglas, with whom she had two sons, Michael Douglas and Joel Douglas.

Bayard married Lucy Clare Watlington on 3 July 1930. They had two sons, barrister Nicholas Bayard Dill Jr, born in 1932, and Henry David Melville Dill, born in 1934. His grandson Nick Dill is the current Anglican Bishop of Bermuda.

Bayard Dill received a knighthood in 1951. He died aged 87 after a heart attack on 10 September 1993, being eulogised, like his father, in the Royal Gazette.
