= Patrick White (bishop) =

The Rt Rev Patrick White is a retired Bishop of Bermuda. He was ordained after a period of study at Wycliffe College and is now an honorary Doctor of Divinity there. Married to Elizabeth, he was elected in September 2008 and consecrated in January 2009. He retired from office in September 2012 upon his 70th birthday. He was succeeded by Nicholas Dill, who was consecrated as the Bishop of Bermuda on May 29, 2013. He now lives in the Toronto area.
