= Nick Dill =

Bermudian Anglican bishop

The Right Reverend Nick Dill
- Bishop of Bermuda
- Church: Anglican Church of Bermuda
- Province: extra-provincial
- In office: 2013 to present
- Predecessor: Patrick White

Orders
- Ordination: 1997
- Consecration: 29 May 2013 by Nick Baines

Personal details
- Born: 1963 (age 62–63)
- Denomination: Anglicanism
- Education: Trinity College, Toronto; Queen Mary University of London; Wycliffe Hall, Oxford

Nicholas Bayard Botolf Dill (born 1963) is a Bermudian Anglican bishop.

== Background ==
Dill, one of three siblings, was born in 1963 to Nicholas Bayard Dill Jr. and his wife, Bitten (née Birgitte Brodtkorb). His mother is of Norwegian ancestry.

The Dill family has resided in Bermuda since the 1630s, and through his ancestor, Ruth Rapilje Neilson, he is a descendant of American Revolutionary War hero John Neilson as well as the Bayard and Schuyler families of New York and New Jersey. Dill is a cousin of the Academy Award-winning actor and producer Michael Douglas.

Dill was educated at Saltus Grammar School in Bermuda and then at Oundle School in the England, both independent schools. In 1986, Dill graduated with a Bachelor of Arts (BA) degree in history and politics from Trinity College of the University of Toronto. He went on to earn a Bachelor of Laws (LLB) degree from Queen Mary College in London in 1990.

After graduating with his law degree, he undertook a pupillage at the chambers of Roger Henderson, after which he qualified as a barrister. He then worked at Conyers Dill & Pearman, the law firm cofounded by his grandfather Bayard Dill.

== Faith and ordained ministry ==
Dill became a committed Christian after being inspired by the faith of his older sister Karin.

Dill went to the UK for theological training and studied at Wycliffe Hall, Oxford. He was ordained in the Church of England as a deacon by Bishop Ewen Ratteray in 1998 and as a priest in 1999. From 1998 to 2005, he served his curacy and then as an associate minister at All Saints Church, Lindfield in the Diocese of Chichester. In 2005, he returned to Bermuda to become priest in charge of the Parish of Pembroke. During his seven years leading the parish of three churches, attendance rose from 350 to 500 people each week.

On 2 February 2013, Dill was elected as the Bishop of Bermuda. He was consecrated as a bishop on 29 May 2013 by Nicholas Baines, the Bishop of Bradford, on behalf of the Archbishop of Canterbury. He was then installed as the 12th, and youngest, Anglican Bishop of Bermuda at the Cathedral of the Most Holy Trinity in Hamilton, Bermuda.

== Personal life ==
Dill married Fiona Campbell in 1990 and has six children.
