= Anglican Church of Bermuda =

Extra-provincial Church of the Anglican Communion

Arms of the Diocese of Bermuda

The Anglican Church of Bermuda (as the Church of England in the British Overseas Territory of Bermuda was retitled in 1978) is a single diocese consisting of nine parishes and is part of the Anglican Communion, though not a part of an ecclesiastical province. The current Bishop of Bermuda, seated at the Cathedral of the Most Holy Trinity in the City of Hamilton, is Nicholas Dill, who was installed on 29 May 2013.

As an extra-provincial diocese, both metropolitan and primatial authority come directly from the Archbishop of Canterbury. Among its parish churches is St. Peter's Church in the UNESCO World Heritage Site of St. George's Town. St. George's is the oldest English town in the New World and St. Peter's is the oldest Protestant church in the New World. In 2010, the Anglican Church of Bermuda claimed 14,000 members. According to the 2010 census, about 16% of Bermudians self-identified with the Anglican Church, making it the largest Christian denomination in Bermuda.

== History ==
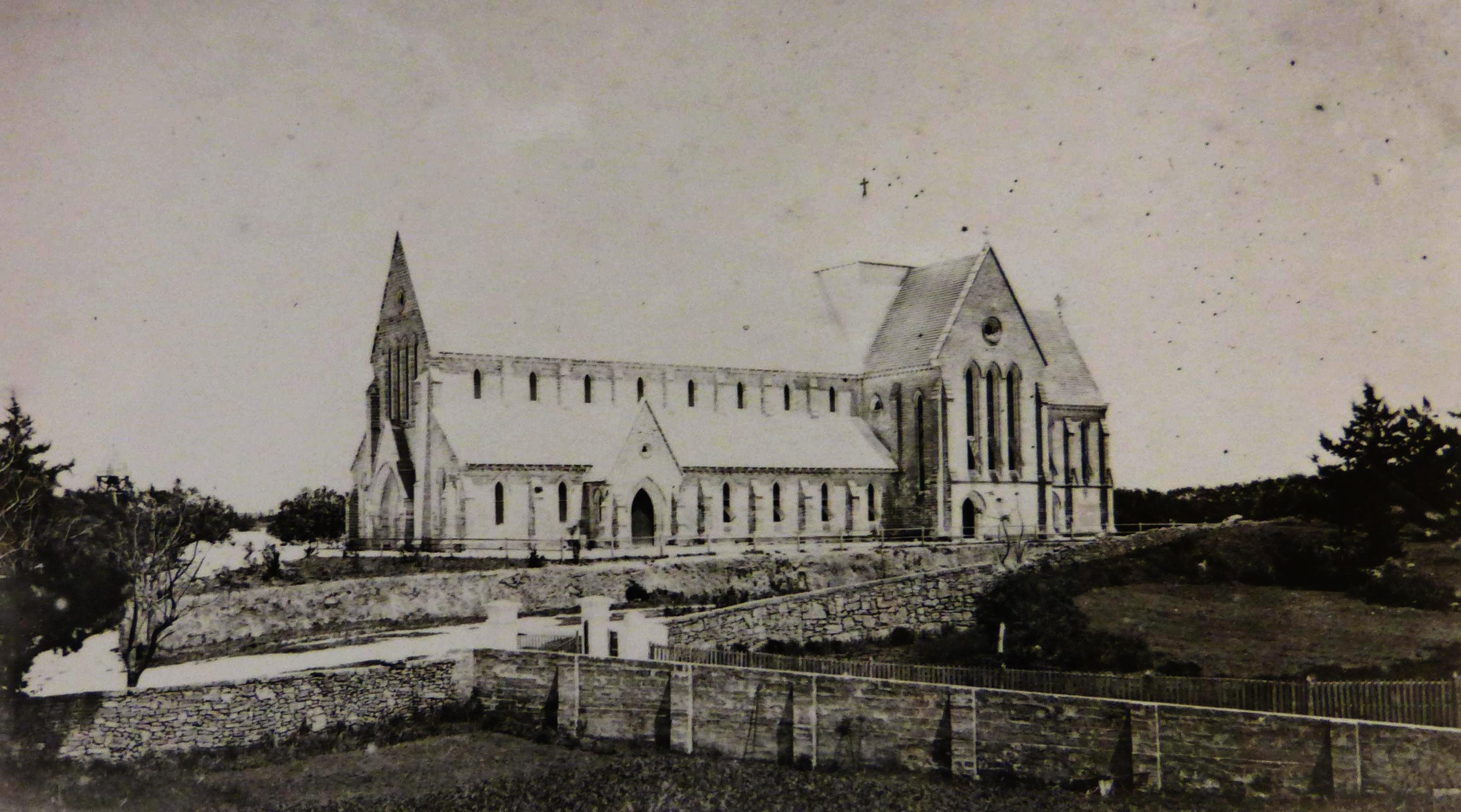
Trinity Church chapel-of-ease in the City of Hamilton in 1879

The first Church of England services in Bermuda were celebrated by the Reverend Richard Buck, one of the survivors of the 1609 wreck of the Sea Venture who began Bermuda's permanent settlement. Nine parishes, each with its own church and glebe land, were created when colonisation became official in 1612, but there was rarely more than a pair of clergy to share between them over the following two centuries. From 1825 to 1839, Bermuda was attached to the See of Nova Scotia. Bermuda then became part of the Diocese of Newfoundland and Bermuda from its creation in 1839 until 1919. In 1879, the synod of the Church of England in Bermuda was formed and a Diocese of Bermuda became separate from the Diocese of Newfoundland, but continued to be grouped under the Bishop of Newfoundland and Bermuda until 1919 when Newfoundland and Bermuda each received its own bishop. Bermuda's first resident bishop, the Rt. Reverend Arthur Heber Browne who served from 1925 to 1948. In 1896, Black Anglican congregants in the Pembroke Parish organized The Guild of the Good Shepherd, indicating a specific mission to, "improve the social and intellectual standard of its members." This society has remained active for more than 125 years.

In 1994, the Synod of the Anglican Church of Bermuda voted to support the decriminalization of homosexuality. In 2008, the then-bishop elect confirmed that gay and lesbian priests may serve in the church as long as they remain celibate. In 2022, Lorita Packwood and Jennie Foster Skelton were ordained as the first female deacons in the Anglican Church of Bermuda. This was the first time the Anglican Church of Bermuda ordained women for ministry.

In 2024, Rachel Marszalek became the first woman licensed as a priest-in-charge in the Anglican Church of Bermuda. On the Diocesan website, speaking of some congregations, the Diocese says that "all are welcome, no matter what gender, sexuality, race, age, or social standing."

=== Parish structure ===
In the British Overseas Territory of Bermuda, the nine Church of England (since 1978, renamed the Anglican Church of Bermuda as an extra provincial diocese of the Archbishop of Canterbury) parishes are identical with the civil parishes established following official settlement in 1612. Whereas in England the ecclesiastic parishes generally bear the name of the parish church, in Bermuda the parishes are named for shareholders of the London Company or its successor, the Company of the City of London for the Plantacion of The Somers Isles, with most of the parish churches named for saints, starting with St. Peter's Church, established in 1612 in St. George's Parish (the only parish named for a saint) as the first Protestant church in the New World.

=== Cathedral ===
The Diocese of Newfoundland and Bermuda, before a separate Bishop of Bermuda was created in 1919, maintained both the Cathedral of St. John the Baptist at St. John's, Newfoundland, and a chapel-of-ease named Trinity Church in the City of Hamilton in Pembroke Parish, Bermuda (which was not to be confused with the much smaller St. John's Church, the parish church for Pembroke Parish). Trinity Church was destroyed by arson and replaced with a similar structure by 1905, which became the Cathedral of the Most Holy Trinity when the Bishop of Bermuda was established as separate from the Bishop of Newfoundland in 1919.
