= Devonshire Parish =

Parish of Bermuda

Coordinates: 32°18′00″N 64°45′30″W

Devonshire Parish is one of the nine parishes of Bermuda. Originally named Cavendish Tribe and later Devonshire Tribe, for William Cavendish, 1st Earl of Devonshire (1552–1626). Devonshire Redoubt, on Castle Island, one of the Castle Harbour fortifications of St. George's Parish, was also named after him.

== Location ==
It is located in the centre of the territory, close to the junction between the main part of the main island and the peninsula containing the capital, Hamilton, and Pembroke Parish (to which it is joined in the west). To the northeast, it is joined to Smith's Parish, and to the southwest it borders Paget Parish. As with most of Bermuda's parishes, it covers just over 2.3 square miles (6.0 km^{2}). North Shore Road, Middle Road, and South Shore Road all go through this parish. It had a population of 7,087 in 2016.

== Natural features ==
Natural features in Devonshire include Devonshire Bay, and Devonshire Marsh. Devonshire Bay is located on the South shore of Bermuda. There is a national park here and remnants of a fort. Boats moor in the bay for its relatively calm waters. The remnants of the fort was one of the forts from the "fortress Bermuda" project when Bermuda was becoming militarized after the American Revolution. This is the only public beach on the south shore of Devonshire.

Devonshire marsh is in the center of the parish and is on the north side of Middle Road. It was originally known as "brackish pond", which gave the parish its first name before being officially named. It has been hit by human development over the years; sections were drained for farming and commercial activities. In 1996 there was a significant fire in Devonshire marsh, but the area has recovered since then. There are two nature reserves in the marsh area for its protection - the Firefly and Freer cox nature reserves.

Other, less known natural features include Robinson bay, Orange Valley, Palmetto Park, Garthowen Park, and Friendship Vale Park.

== Education ==
Public schools in Devonshire Parish:

- Devonshire Preschool
- Prospect Preschool
- Elliot Primary School
- Prospect Primary School
- Cedarbridge Academy (senior school)
- Dame Marjorie Bean Hope Academy (special school for multiply-impaired students) - It may hold up to 25 students.
- The Education Center (special school for students with behavioural issues) - It may hold up to 30 students.

Private schools in Devonshire Parish:

- Somersfield Academy

== Notable people ==
- Kiera Aitken (born 1983), Olympic swimmer
- Sheila Ming-Burgess, international fashion model and actress
- Thomas Melville Dill, lawyer, politician and army officer
- Nicholas Bayard Dill, lawyer, politician and army officer
- Diana Douglas (born Dill), actress
- Mary Prince (c.1788 in Devonshire Marsh, Bermuda – died after 1833) British abolitionist and autobiographer

== Notable landmarks ==
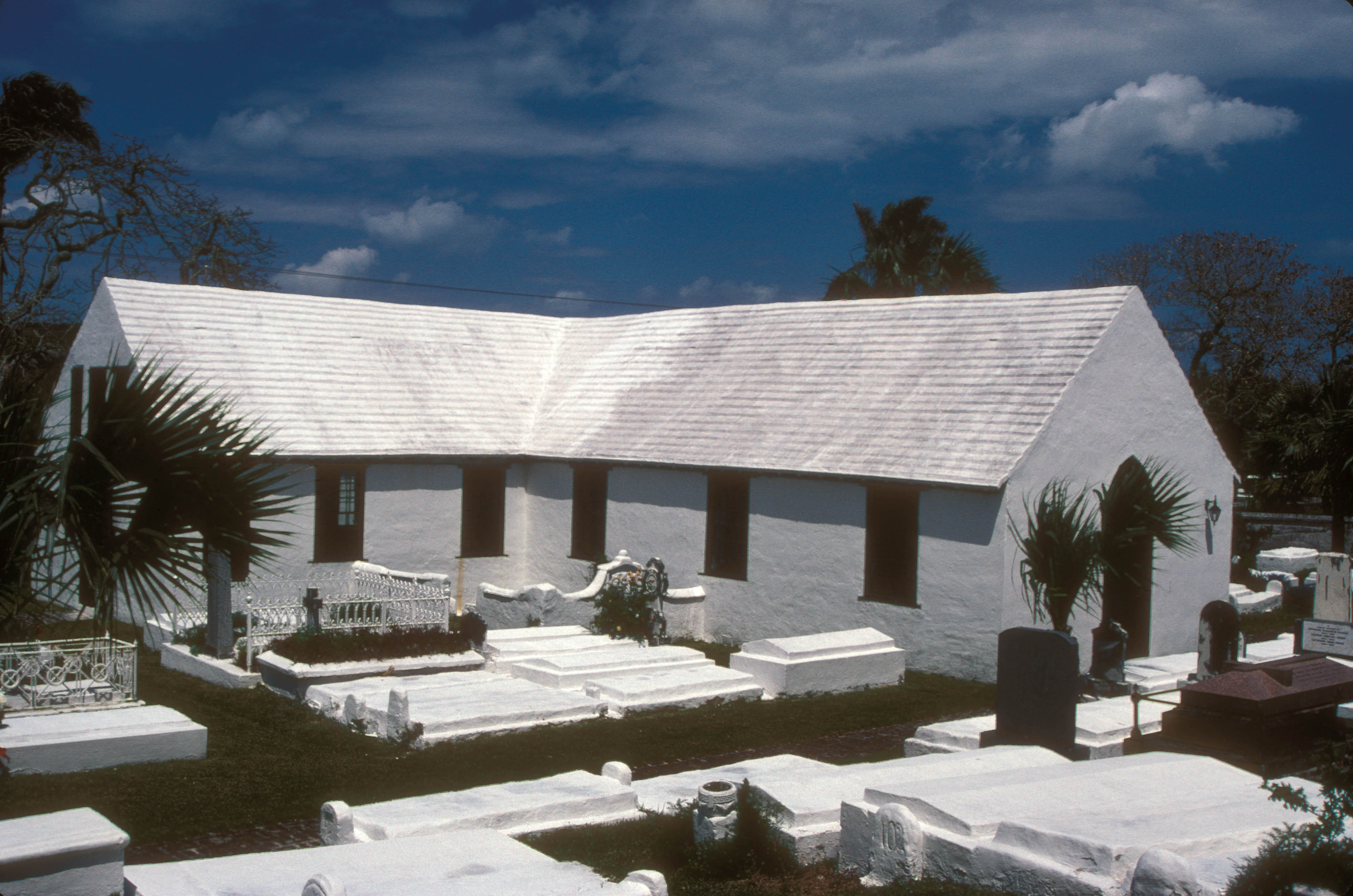
Old Devonshire Church in the parish

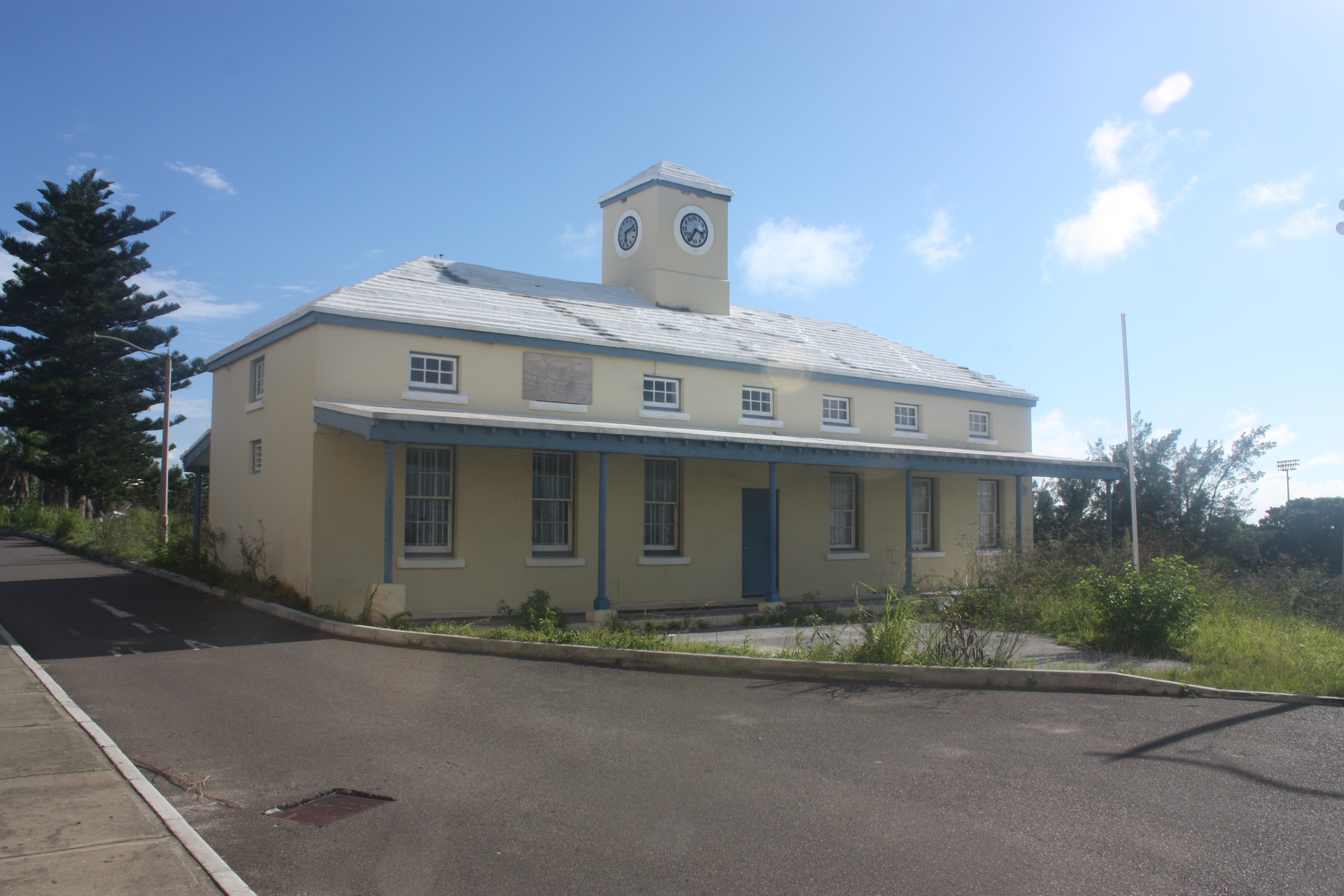
The Guard House at Prospect Camp in 2011

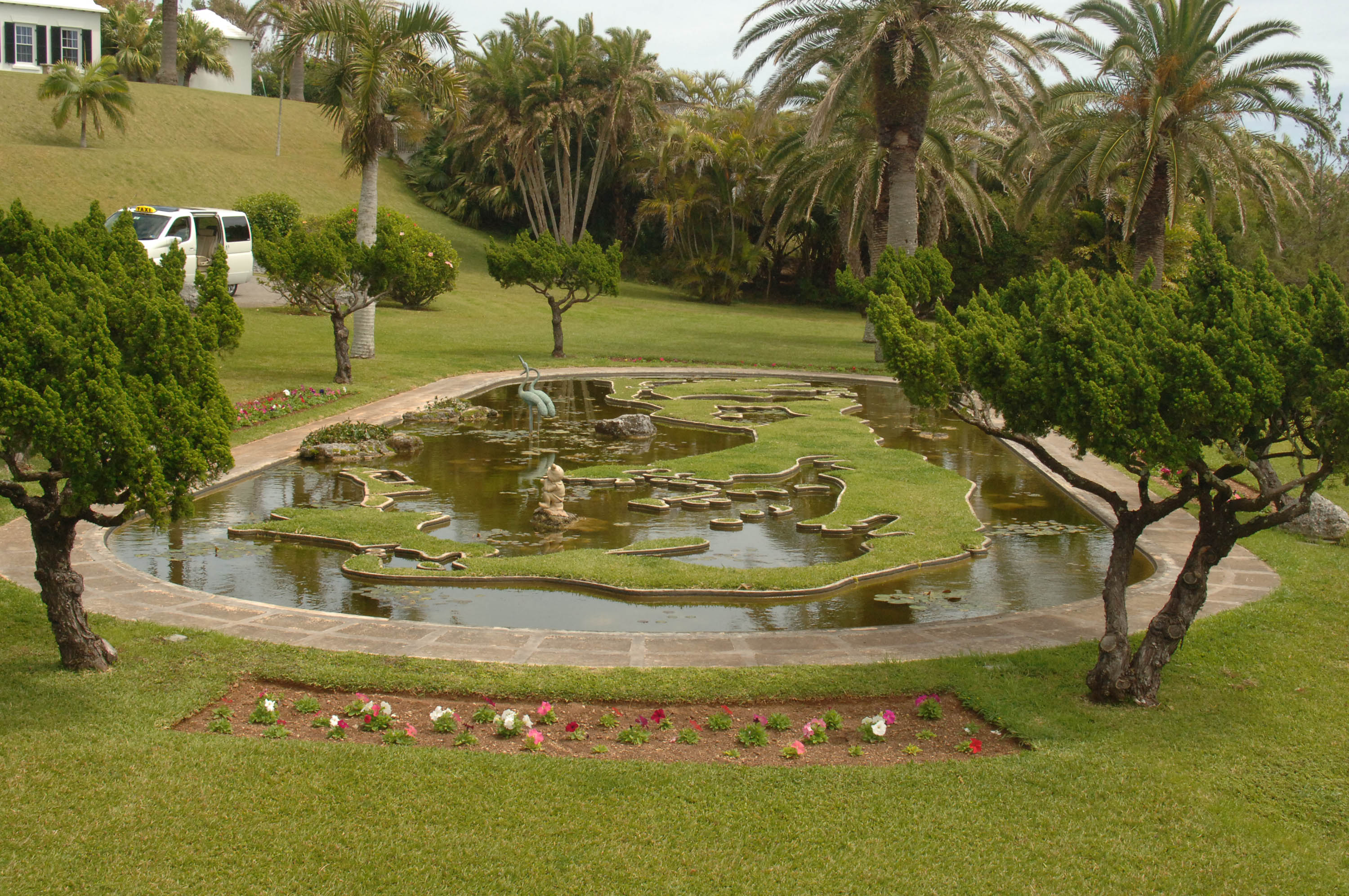
Palm Grove Gardens
