= Kirk Douglas filmography =

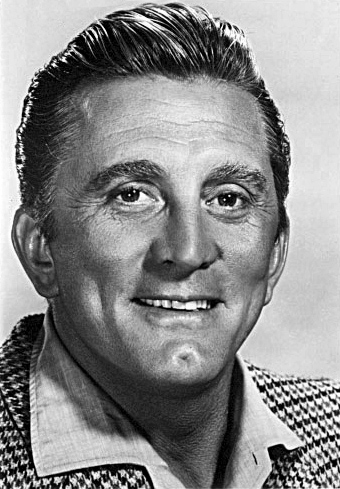
Douglas in 1969

The following is the filmography of American actor Kirk Douglas (1916–2020). His popular films include Out of the Past (1947), Champion (1949), Ace in the Hole (1951), The Bad and the Beautiful (1952), 20,000 Leagues Under the Sea (1954), Lust for Life (1956), Paths of Glory (1957), Gunfight at the O.K. Corral (1957), The Vikings (1958), Spartacus (1960), Lonely Are the Brave (1962), Seven Days in May (1964), The Heroes of Telemark (1965), Saturn 3 (1980) and Tough Guys (1986).

He is No. 17 on the American Film Institute's list of the greatest male screen legends in American film history. In 1996, he received the Academy Honorary Award "for 50 years as a creative and moral force in the motion picture community".

== Filmography ==
=== As actor ===
Year	Title	Role	Notes
1946	The Strange Love of Martha Ivers	Walter O'Neil	
1947	Mourning Becomes Electra	Peter Niles	
1947	Out of the Past	Whit Sterling	
1948	I Walk Alone	Noll "Dink" Turner	
1948	The Walls of Jericho	Tucker Wedge	
1948	My Dear Secretary	Owen Waterbury	
1949	A Letter to Three Wives	George Phipps	
1949	Champion	Michael "Midge" Kelly	Nominated - Academy Award for Best Actor
1950	Young Man with a Horn	Rick Martin	
1950	The Glass Menagerie	Jim O'Connor	
1951	Along the Great Divide	Marshal Len Merrick	
1951	Ace in the Hole	Chuck Tatum	
1951	Detective Story	Detective Jim McLeod	
1952	The Big Trees	Jim Fallon	
1952	The Big Sky	Jim Deakins	
1952	The Bad and the Beautiful	Jonathan Shields	Nominated - Academy Award for Best Actor
1953	The Story of Three Loves	Pierre Narval (segment "Equilibrium")	
1953	The Juggler	Hans Muller	
1953	Act of Love	Robert Teller	
1954	20,000 Leagues Under the Sea	Ned Land	
1955	The Racers	Gino Borgesa	
1955	Ulysses	Odysseus	
1955	Man Without a Star	Dempsey Rae	
1955	The Indian Fighter	Johnny Hawks	
1956	Lust for Life	Vincent van Gogh	Nominated - Academy Award for Best Actor
1957	Top Secret Affair	Maj. Gen. Melville A. Goodwin	
1957	Gunfight at the O.K. Corral	Doc Holliday	
1957	Paths of Glory	Colonel Dax	
1958	The Vikings	Einar	
1959	Last Train from Gun Hill	Matt Morgan	
1959	The Devil's Disciple	Richard "Dick" Dudgeon	
1959	Operation Petticoat	Welding Seaman	Uncredited
1960	Strangers When We Meet	Larry Coe	
1960	Spartacus	Spartacus	
1961	Town Without Pity	Major Garrett	
1961	The Last Sunset	Brendan "Bren" O'Malley	
1962	Lonely Are the Brave	John W. "Jack" Burns	
1962	Two Weeks in Another Town	Jack Andrus	
1963	The Hook	Sgt. P.J. Briscoe	
1963	The List of Adrian Messenger	George Brougham, Vicar Atlee, Mr. Pythian, Arthur Henderson	
1963	For Love or Money	Donald Kenneth "Deke" Gentry	
1964	Seven Days in May	Colonel Jiggs Casey	
1965	In Harm's Way	Commander Paul Eddington	
1965	The Heroes of Telemark	Dr Rolf Pedersen	
1966	Cast a Giant Shadow	Col. Mickey Marcus	
1966	Is Paris Burning?	Gen. George Patton	
1967	The Way West	Sen. William J. Tadlock	
1967	The War Wagon	Lomax	
1968	A Lovely Way to Die	Jim Schuyler	
1968	The Brotherhood	Frank Ginetta	
1968	The Legend of Silent Night	Voice, Narrator	Television film
1969	The Arrangement	Eddie Anderson	
1970	There Was a Crooked Man...	Paris Pitman Jr.	
1971	To Catch a Spy	Andrej	
1971	The Light at the Edge of the World	Will Denton	
1971	A Gunfight	Will Tenneray	
1972	A Man to Respect	Steve Wallace	
1972	The Special London Bridge Special	The Indian Fighter	Television film
1973	Scalawag	Peg	Also director
1973	Dr. Jekyll and Mr. Hyde	Dr. Jekyll and Mr. Hyde	Television film
1974	Mousey	George Anderson	Television film
1975	Posse	Marshal Howard Nightingale	Also director/producer/co-writer
1975	Once Is Not Enough	Mike Wayne	
1976	Victory at Entebbe	Hershel Vilnofsky	Television film
1976	Arthur Hailey's the Moneychangers	Alex Vandervoort	Miniseries
1977	Holocaust 2000 (aka The Chosen)	Robert Caine	a.k.a. Rain of Fire
1978	The Fury	Peter Sandza	
1979	The Villain	Cactus Jack	
1980	Saturn 3	Adam	
1980	Home Movies	Dr. Tuttle "The Maestro"	
1980	The Final Countdown	Capt. Matthew Yelland	
1982	The Man from Snowy River	Harrison/Spur	
1982	Remembrance of Love	Joe Rabin	Television film
1983	Eddie Macon's Run	Marzack	
1984	Draw!	Harry H. Holland	Television film
1985	Amos	Amos Lasher	Television film
1986	Tough Guys	Archie Long	
1987	Queenie	David Konig	Miniseries
1988	Inherit the Wind	Matthew Harrison Brady	Television film
1991	Oscar	Eduardo Provolone	
1991	Veraz/Welcome to Veraz	Quentin	
1991	Tales from the Crypt	General Kalthrob	Episode: "Yellow"
1992	The Secret	Grandpa Mike Dunmore	Television film
1994	Greedy	Uncle Joe McTeague	
1994	Take Me Home Again	Ed Reece	Television film
1996	The Simpsons	Chester J. Lampwick	Voice, episode: "The Day the Violence Died"
1999	Diamonds	Harry Agensky	
2000	Touched by an Angel	Ross Burger	Episode: "Bar Mitzvah"
2003	It Runs in the Family	Mitchell Gromberg	His son Michael Douglas and grandson Cameron Douglas also appeared in the film
2004	Illusion	Donald Baines	
2008	Empire State Building Murders	Jim Kovalski	Television film; a.k.a. Meurtres à L'Empire State Building; final role

=== As producer ===
Year	Film	Production company	Awards
1955	The Indian Fighter	Bryna Productions	
1956	Spring Reunion	Bryna Productions	
1957	Lizzie	Bryna Productions	
1957	The Careless Years	Bryna Productions / Michael Productions	
1957	Ride Out for Revenge	Bryna Productions	
1957	Paths of Glory	Bryna Productions / Harris-Kubrick Pictures Corporation	Grand Prix de l'UCC Italian National Syndicate of Film Journalists Silver Ribbon for Best Foreign Director Jussi Award for Best Foreign Director National Film Preservation Board National Film Registry Nominated—BAFTA Award for Best Film from any Source Nominated—Golden Laurel Award for Top Male Supporting Performance Nominated—Writers Guild of America Award for Best Written American Drama
1958	The Vikings	Brynaprod / Curtleigh Productions	Golden Laurel Award for Top Action Drama San Sebastián International Film Festival Zulueta Prize Nominated—Directors Guild of America Award for Outstanding Directorial Achievement in Motion Pictures
1959	Tales of the Vikings	Brynaprod	
1959	The Devil's Disciple	Brynaprod / Hecht-Hill-Lancaster Films	Nominated—BAFTA Award for Best British Actor
1959	Last Train from Gun Hill	Bryna Productions / Wallis-Hazen Productions	Nominated—Golden Laurel Award for Top Action Performance
1960	Spartacus	Bryna Productions	Academy Award for Best Actor in a Supporting Role Academy Award for Best Cinematography, Color Academy Award for Best Art Direction-Set Decoration, Color Academy Award for Best Costume Design Golden Globe Award for Best Motion Picture – Drama Huabiao Film Award — Outstanding Translated Foreign Film International Film Music Critics Award for Best Archival Release of an Existing Score Motion Picture Sound Editors Golden Reel Award for Best Sound Editing - Feature Film National Film Preservation Board National Film Registry Nominated—Academy Award for Best Film Editing Nominated—Academy Award for Best Music, Scoring of a Dramatic or Comedy Picture Nominated—Golden Globe Award for Best Director Nominated—Golden Globe Award for Best Actor – Motion Picture Drama Nominated—Golden Globe Award for Best Supporting Actor Nominated—Golden Globe Award for Best Original Score Nominated—BAFTA Award for Best Film from any Source Nominated—Golden Laurel Award for Top Male Dramatic Performance Nominated—Golden Laurel Award for Top Male Supporting Performance Nominated—Writers Guild of America Award for Best Written American Drama
1960	Strangers When We Meet	Bryna Productions / Quine Productions	
1961	The Last Sunset	Brynaprod	Nominated—Golden Laurel Award for Top Action Performance
1962	Lonely Are the Brave	Joel Productions	Motion Picture Sound Editors Golden Reel Award for Best Sound Editing - Feature Film Nominated—BAFTA Award for Best Foreign Actor Nominated—Golden Laurel Award for Top Action Performance
1963	The List of Adrian Messenger	Joel Productions	Nominated—Edgar Allan Poe Award for Best Motion Picture
1964	Seven Days in May	Joel Productions / John Frankenheimer Productions / Seven Arts Productions	Golden Globe Award for Best Supporting Actor Bodil Award for Best Non-European Film Boxoffice Blue Ribbon Award for Best Picture of the Month David di Donatello Award for Best Foreign Actor Nominated—Academy Award for Best Actor in a Supporting Role Nominated—Academy Award for Best Art Direction-Set Decoration, Black and White Nominated—Golden Globe Award for Best Director Nominated—Golden Globe Award for Best Actor – Motion Picture Drama Nominated—Golden Globe Award for Best Original Score Nominated—Golden Laurel Award for Top Drama Nominated—Golden Laurel Award for Top Male Dramatic Performance Nominated—Writers Guild of America Award for Best Written American Drama
1966	Seconds	Douglas and Lewis Productions / Joel Productions / John Frankenheimer Productions / Gibraltar Productions	National Film Preservation Board National Film Registry Nominated—Academy Award for Best Cinematography, Black and White Nominated—Bambi Award for Best Actor - International Nominated—Cannes Film Festival Palme d'Or
1966	Grand Prix	Douglas and Lewis Productions / Joel Productions / John Frankenheimer Productions / Cherokee Productions	Academy Award for Best Sound Academy Award for Best Film Editing Academy Award for Best Effects, Sound Effects Nominated—Golden Globe Award for Most Promising Newcomer - Male Nominated—Golden Globe Award for Most Promising Newcomer - Female Nominated—American Cinema Editors Award for Best Edited Feature Film Nominated—Directors Guild of America Award for Outstanding Directorial Achievement in Motion Pictures
1968	The Brotherhood	Bryna Productions / Martin Ritt Productions / The Brotherhood Company	Nominated—Writers Guild of America Award for Best Written American Original Screenplay
1971	Catch Me a Spy	Ludgate Films / Les Films de la Pléiade / Capitole Films	
1971	A Gunfight	The Bryna Company / Joel Productions / Harvest Productions / Thoroughbred Productions	
1971	The Light at the Edge of the World	The Bryna Company / Bryna Productions / Jet Films / Triumfilm	Nominated—Fotogramas de Plata for Best Spanish Movie Performer
1971	Summertree	The Bryna Company / Bryna Productions	
1973	Scalawag	The Bryna Company	
1975	Posse	The Bryna Company / Zeeuwse Maatschappij	Nominated—Berlin International Film Festival Golden Berlin Bear
1980	The Final Countdown	The Bryna Company / Film Finance Group	Golden Screen Award Nominated—Saturn Award for Best Science Fiction Film Nominated—Saturn Award for Best Actor
1983	Something Wicked This Way Comes	The Bryna Company / Walt Disney Productions	Saturn Award for Best Fantasy Film Saturn Award for Best Writing Nominated—Saturn Award for Best Supporting Actor Nominated—Saturn Award for Best Music Nominated—Saturn Award for Best Costumes Nominated—Saturn Award for Best Make-Up Nominated—Saturn Award for Best Saturn Award for Best Special Effects Nominated—Avoriaz Fantastic Film Festival Grand Prize Nominated—Hugo Award for Best Dramatic Presentation
1984	Draw!	The Bryna Company / Astral Film Productions	Genie Award for Best Performance by an Actress in a Supporting Role Nominated—CableACE Award for Film Editing Nominated—Genie Award for Best Achievement in Cinematography Nominated—Genie Award for Best Achievement in Art Direction Nominated—Genie Award for Best Achievement in Sound Editing Nominated—Genie Award for Best Achievement in Overall Sound
1985	Amos	The Bryna Company / Vincent Pictures	Nominated—Golden Globe Award for Best Miniseries or Motion Picture Made for Television Nominated—Golden Globe Award for Best Performance by an Actor in a Miniseries or Motion Picture Made for Television Nominated—Golden Globe Award for Best Performance by an Actor in a Supporting Role in a Series, Miniseries or Motion Picture Made for Television Nominated—Primetime Emmy Award for Outstanding Drama/Comedy Special Nominated—Primetime Emmy Award for Outstanding Lead Actor in a Miniseries or a Special Nominated—Primetime Emmy Award for Outstanding Supporting Actor in a Miniseries or a Special Nominated—Primetime Emmy Award for Outstanding Supporting Actress in a Miniseries or a Special
1986	Tough Guys	The Bryna Company / Touchstone Pictures / Silver Screen Partners II	Nominated—Golden Globe Award for Best Original Song - Motion Picture
