= A Tiger's Tale =

1987 film by Peter Douglas

- Theatrical poster
- Directed by: Peter Douglas
- Screenplay by: Peter Douglas
- Based on: Love and Other Natural Disasters by Allen Hannay III
- Produced by: Don Goldman; Peter Douglas
- Starring: Ann-Margret; C. Thomas Howell; Charles Durning; Kelly Preston
- Cinematography: Tony Pierce-Roberts
- Edited by: David Campling
- Music by: Lee Holdridge, the Textones
- Production company: Vincent Pictures
- Distributed by: Atlantic Releasing
- Release dates: August 22, 1987 (Montreal World Film Festival); February 12, 1988 (U.S.)
- Running time: 97 minutes
- Country: United States
- Budget: $7 million
- Box office: $89,000

A Tiger's Tale is a 1987 American comedy-drama film starring Ann-Margret and C. Thomas Howell, written and directed by Peter Douglas, based on the novel Love and Other Natural Disasters by Allen Hannay III.

== Plot ==
Bubber Drumm is a Houston high school student. Rose Butts is an alcoholic, more than twice his age, and the mother of his girlfriend, Shirley. Bubber and Rose begin an affair after Bubber fixes Shirley up with his pal, Ransom McKnight.

Bubber and Rose carry on their affair under the nose of her daughter until everything comes out in the open at a drive-in movie theater. To get even with Bubber and Rose for "behaving badly", Shirley pricks a hole in Rose's diaphragm. Shirley goes on to live with her father and Bubber moves in with Rose along with his pet tiger. The diaphragm incident results in Rose getting pregnant with Bubber's baby. The couple must decide whether to keep the baby and continue their May/December romance or part ways.

Throughout the film, they end up in the small town of Fairchilds, Texas, and they go dancing at the Fairchild Hall.

== Principal cast ==
| Actor | Role |
|---|---|
| Ann-Margret | Rose Butts |
| C. Thomas Howell | Bubber Drumm |
| Charles Durning | Charlie Drumm |
| Kelly Preston | Shirley Butts |
| Ann Wedgeworth | Claudine |
| William Zabka | Randy |
| James Noble | Sinclair |
| Sean Patrick Flanery | Buddy |

== Music ==
The non-score music is by the Textones (Carla Olson, Phil Seymour, Joe Read, George Callins, Tom Jr Morgan).

== Critical reception ==
Roger Ebert of The Chicago Sun-Times gave the film 2 out of 4 stars although he did like certain aspects of the film:

Some movies don't seem to know what they're really about, and A Tiger's Tale is one of them... What does work in the film, however, is the unlikely relationship between Howell and Ann-Margret... The movie is top-heavy with plot, and what's good in it gets lost in the confusion.

— Roger Ebert, The Chicago Sun-Times

Janet Maslin of The New York Times:

A Tiger's Tale, which opens today at Loews 84th Street Six, is most notable for what it doesn't have: a heavy hand. The material has more than enough potential to become painfully silly, and Mr. Douglas's biggest accomplishment is making sure that doesn't happen.

— Janet Maslin, The New York Times
