= Amos (film) =

- Based on: Amos: To Ride a Dead Horse (1983) by Stanley Gordon West (1932–2015)
- Screenplay by: Richard Kramer
- Directed by: Michael Tuchner
- Starring: Kirk Douglas; Elizabeth Montgomery; Dorothy McGuire; Pat Morita; James Sloyan; Ray Walston
- Composer: Georges Delerue
- Country of origin: United States
- Original language: English

Production
- Producers: Peter Douglas; William R. Finnegan; Sheldon Pinchuk
- Cinematography: Fred J. Koenekamp
- Editor: David Campling
- Running time: 100 minutes
- Production companies: The Bryna Company; Amos Productions

Original release
- Network: CBS
- Release: September 29, 1985

Amos is a 1985 American made-for-television drama film directed by Michael Tuchner and written by Richard Kramer. It is based on the 1983 novel Amos: To Ride a Dead Horse by Stanley Gordon West. The film stars Kirk Douglas, Elizabeth Montgomery, Dorothy McGuire, Pat Morita, James Sloyan and Ray Walston. The film premiered on CBS on September 29, 1985. It was nominated for four Primetime Emmy Awards at the 38th Primetime Emmy Awards.

== Plot ==
The opening of the movie reveals a couple having breakfast, then going on a road trip or outing, when suddenly Amos, who is driving, and his wife are involved in a major accident that claims her life and severely injures him. Amos wakes up in a hospital, to realize that his wife died as a result of the accident and his home has been sold.

Amos is sent to the Sunset Nursing Home. There, he meets an old baseball friend and gets in a relationship with a female resident, Hester. The head nurse, Daisy Daws, is notorious for running the facility with strict rules that are enforced by Roland, an orderly. Daisy also has an affair with the local Sheriff so none of the residents dare to complain about her. Even when a County Commissioner, Burt, pays a surprise visit, he is only told good things about the facility and Daisy.

One night, Daisy administers an overdose of barbiturates to Amos' roommate, while Amos pretends to be sleeping. He watches it happen and can't do anything about it. Later, after the remains are picked up by morticians, Amos questions Daisy of why she did that and she threatens to do the same to him unless he puts his life insurance policy in her name.

Amos' grandson pays him a visit and offers to let his grandfather come live with him, but Amos does not want to abandon his friends in the nursing home.

Amos then sneaks into Daisy's bedroom to steal a syringe, needle, and the barbiturates which were used to euthanize her residents. He picks a fight with Roland so that he suffers bruises and other skin injuries, injects himself with the barbiturates and is found dead the next morning. Just before he administered his own lethal injection, Amos had written a letter to the state that Daisy forced him to put his life insurance on her name, he fears she will kill him, and if he dies, an autopsy should be performed and that the benefits from his life insurance policy should be shared between his grandson and Hester.

Faced with the letter that Amos wrote and the results of the autopsy (which reveals "enough barbiturates to kill seven people"), the Sheriff arrests Daisy despite her screams and threats to expose his infidelity.

== Cast ==
- Kirk Douglas as Amos Lasher
- Elizabeth Montgomery as Daisy Daws
- Dorothy McGuire as Hester Farrell
- Pat Morita as Tommy Tanaka
- James Sloyan as Sheriff John Thomas
- Ray Walston as Johnny Kent
- Jerry Hausner as Sol Kessler
- Don Keefer as Winston Beard
- Camila Ashland as Mildred Lasher
- Frances Bay as Lydia
- Frederick Coffin as Roland
- Lois de Banzie as Dorothy Dearborn
- Helen Martin as Mrs. McKenzie
- Royce Wallace as Helen
- Pamela Dunlap as Leah
- Jack Blessing as Scott Lasher
- Jordan Charney as Commissioner Bert Daniels

== Reception ==
Jeff Jarvis, writing for People, disliked the film, calling it a failure and stating that the film tries to fit into too many disparate genres.

=== Accolades ===
Amos was nominated for four Primetime Emmy Awards, in the categories of Outstanding Drama or Comedy Special, Outstanding Lead Actor in a Limited or Anthology Series or Movie, Outstanding Supporting Actor in a Limited or Anthology Series or Movie, and Outstanding Supporting Actress in a Limited or Anthology Series or Movie.

Accolades for Amos
Ceremony	Award	Recipients	Result	Ref.
38th Primetime Emmy Awards	Outstanding Drama or Comedy Special	Peter Douglas; Bill Finnegan; Sheldon Pinchuk	Nominated	
38th Primetime Emmy Awards	Outstanding Lead Actor in a Limited or Anthology Series or Movie	Kirk Douglas	Nominated	
38th Primetime Emmy Awards	Outstanding Supporting Actor in a Limited or Anthology Series or Movie	Pat Morita	Nominated	
38th Primetime Emmy Awards	Outstanding Supporting Actress in a Limited or Anthology Series or Movie	Dorothy McGuire	Nominated	
