= The Ragman's Son =

1988 autobiography by Kirk Douglas

- First edition cover
- Author: Kirk Douglas
- Genre: Autobiography
- Publisher: Simon & Schuster
- Publication date: August 1, 1988

The Ragman's Son is the title of the first autobiography by American actor Kirk Douglas, published in 1988.

In this book, Douglas chronicles his life story, from his beginnings as the only son in a family of six girls born to a poor Jewish immigrant, to his lust to become an actor. He writes about studying drama at college, to getting his big break in Hollywood and of his later years where he jokingly remarks that he is now best known as the father of actor Michael Douglas.
