= The Final Countdown (film) =

1980 film by Don Taylor

- Theatrical release poster
- Directed by: Don Taylor
- Screenplay by: David Ambrose; Gerry Davis; Thomas Hunter; Peter Powell
- Story by: Thomas Hunter; Peter Powell; David Ambrose
- Produced by: Peter Vincent Douglas
- Starring: Kirk Douglas; Martin Sheen; Katharine Ross; James Farentino; Ron O'Neal; Charles Durning
- Cinematography: Victor J. Kemper
- Edited by: Robert K. Lambert
- Music by: John Scott
- Production company: The Bryna Company
- Distributed by: United Artists
- Release date: August 1, 1980
- Running time: 103 minutes
- Country: United States
- Languages: English; Japanese
- Budget: $12.5 million
- Box office: $56.6 million

The Final Countdown is a 1980 American science fiction war film about a modern, nuclear-powered aircraft carrier that travels through time to the day before the December 7, 1941, attack on Pearl Harbor. It is directed by Don Taylor, his final theatrical film as director, and stars Kirk Douglas, Martin Sheen, James Farentino, Katharine Ross, Ron O'Neal, and Charles Durning.

The film was produced with the cooperation of the United States Navy's naval aviation branch and the United States Department of Defense. It was set and filmed on board USS Nimitz (CVN-68), filming operations of the modern, nuclear warship, which had been launched in the early 1970s. Troma Entertainment founder Lloyd Kaufman was an associate producer of the film, and also has a minor acting role.

The Final Countdown was released by United Artists on August 1, 1980. It received mixed reviews from critics, but was a box office success. It received Saturn Award nominations for Best Science Fiction Film and Best Actor (for Kirk Douglas).

== Plot ==
In 1980, the nuclear-powered aircraft carrier USS Nimitz departs Naval Station Pearl Harbor for exercises in the mid-Pacific Ocean. A civilian systems analyst for Tideman Industries named Warren Lasky is aboard. Lasky, a Department of Defense efficiency expert, is observing ship operations for the reclusive Mr. Tideman, who owns the defense contractor that designed and built Nimitz.

Once at sea, Nimitz encounters a mysterious vortex which renders radar and communications equipment unresponsive. Captain Yelland, commanding officer of the aircraft carrier, is unable to contact U.S. Pacific Fleet Command at Pearl Harbor, and fears there may have been a nuclear strike on Hawaii or the continental United States. One of the ship's reconnaissance aircraft photographs Pearl Harbor, revealing an intact row of World War II era battleships. (Note: At the time of the attack, the U.S. Navy Pacific Fleet was based at Pearl Harbor and consisted mainly of large battleships moored at harbor and smaller/middle-sized naval vessels. The aircraft carriers USS Lexington and USS Enterprise, normally at Pearl Harbor, were at sea on a brief mission to offload aircraft on Midway and Wake Island while USS Saratoga was embarking her aircrew at San Diego.) The ships are identified as being the same ones that had been destroyed during the Japanese attack on Pearl Harbor on December 7, 1941.

Yelland launches two F-14 fighter jets to intercept a surface radar contact and the aircrews witness the sinking of a civilian yacht by two Imperial Japanese Navy Zero fighters. The F-14s attempt to drive off the Zeros without firing, but are forced to shoot them down on Yelland's authority. The Nimitz rescues survivors from the yacht: U.S. Senator Samuel Chapman, his aide Laurel Scott, her dog Charlie, and one of the two downed Zero pilots. Commander Owens, an amateur historian, recognizes Chapman as a politician who could have been Franklin D. Roosevelt's running mate (and potential successor) during his final re-election bid, had Chapman not disappeared shortly before the Pearl Harbor attack.

When a scout aircraft discovers the Japanese fleet poised to launch its attack on Pearl Harbor, the Nimitz crew realizes they've been transported in time to the day before the attack. Yelland has to choose between destroying the Japanese fleet and altering the course of history or allowing history to proceed as they know it. During an interrogation, the Japanese pilot disarms one of his U.S. Marine guards, kills two of them, and takes Scott, Owens, and Lasky hostage. He demands access to a radio to warn the Japanese fleet about the Nimitz. Lasky tells Commander Owens to recite the secret plans for the Japanese attack; the dumbfounded Japanese pilot is killed by Marines.

An attempt to warn Pearl Harbor by radio fails when the Navy considers it a prank. Chapman demands to be taken to Pearl Harbor to warn the naval authorities in person. Yelland orders Owens to fly the civilians and sufficient supplies via helicopter to an isolated Hawaiian island (Niʻihau), assuming they will eventually be rescued. Chapman realizes he's been tricked and uses a flare gun to force the pilot to fly to Pearl Harbor. During a struggle with another crew member, the flare gun discharges, destroying the craft and stranding Scott and Owens on the island. After the Nimitz launches aircraft to intercept the Japanese, the time vortex returns. Unable to outrun the electrical storm, Yelland recalls the planes, and the ship and its aircraft return to 1980, leaving the timeline relatively unchanged. Nimitz returns to Pearl Harbor where Pacific Fleet admirals investigate its unexplained disappearance. Lasky leaves the ship with Scott's dog, Charlie, and encounters the mysterious Mr. Tideman, whom he recognizes as a much older Owens. He and his wife, Laurel Scott, invite Lasky to join them as they have "a lot to talk about".

== Cast ==
- Kirk Douglas as Captain Matthew Yelland, Commanding Officer, USS Nimitz. He was the father of the film's producer who also appears in the film.
- Martin Sheen as Warren Lasky, Systems Analyst with Tideman Industries
- Katharine Ross as Laurel Scott
- James Farentino as Commander Richard "Dick" Owens, Commander, Air Group of Carrier Air Wing 8, later appearing under the identity of Richard Tideman, head of Tideman Industries.
- Ron O'Neal as Commander Dan Thurman, Executive Officer, USS Nimitz
- Charles Durning as Senator Samuel S. Chapman
- Victor Mohica as Lieutenant (JG) Blackcloud, USS Nimitz weather officer
- James C. Lawrence as Lieutenant Perry
- Soon-tek Oh as Kaigun-chūi Shimura, Imperial Japanese Navy Air Service
- Joe Lowry as Commander Damon
- Alvin Ing as Lieutenant Kajima
- Mark Thomas as Corporal Kullman, US Marine Corps
- Harold Bergman as Bellman
- Richard Liberty as Lieutenant Commander Moss
- Lloyd Kaufman as Lieutenant Commander Kaufman
- Dan Fitzgerald as Doctor
- George Henry Strohsahl Jr. as Air Boss
- Peter Douglas as Quartermaster

== Production ==
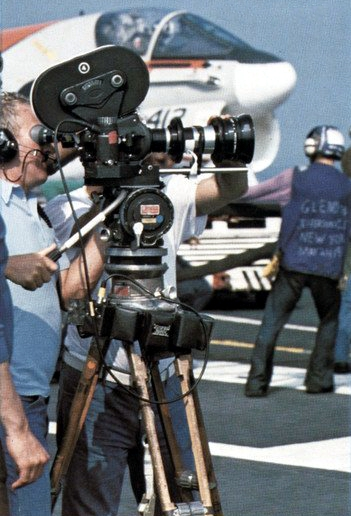
Filming on the flight deck of the Nimitz

Peter Douglas was the driving force behind The Final Countdown. With a limited budget and a promising script, he was able to attract interest from the U.S. Navy. Officials from the Department of Defense offered full cooperation after seeing a script, but insisted that for safety and operational readiness, the film schedule would be dependent on the "on location" naval consultant, William Micklos. Principal photography took place at Naval Air Station Key West, Naval Station Norfolk, and off the Florida Keys, over two five-week periods in 1979. Scenes at Pearl Harbor consisted of mainly stock footage with most of The Final Countdown exteriors shot on the Nimitz while at sea, and at drydock for interiors. During operations, an emergency landing took place with the production crew allowed to film the recovery of the aircraft on the Nimitz; the sequence appeared in the final film.

Crew members of the Nimitz were used as extras, a few with speaking parts; a total of 48 of the crew appear as "actors" in the final credits. The difficulties in filming a modern jet fighter were soon apparent when the first setup to record an F-14 takeoff at Naval Station Norfolk, Virginia, resulted in both camera and operator being pitched down a runway. (Note: The first attempt to film a takeoff on the USS Nimitz resulted in a repeat of the earlier incident as the camera and operator were pitched off the deck, caught in a restraining net below decks.)

Dissension in the production crew led to major changes during location shooting, with a number of the crew being fired and replaced. (Note: Kaufman as unit production manager was upset that unnecessary costs and unreasonable demands were hampering progress. After problems experienced on The Final Countdown, Kaufman set out as an independent producer, head of the Troma Entertainment film studio.) Taylor's direction was considered workmanlike, as he had a reputation for bringing projects in on time and on budget, but suggestions from U.S. naval aviators were ultimately incorporated into the shooting schedules with the "B" crew placed in charge of all the aerial sequences that became the primary focus of the film.

Troma Entertainment founder Lloyd Kaufman was the film's associate producer and unit production manager. He also appears in a minor acting role as an eponymous Lieutenant Commander.

In order to film the aerial sequences, Panavision cameras were mounted on naval aircraft while camera-equipped aircraft and helicopters were leased from Tallmantz Aviation, including a Bell 206 Jet Ranger helicopter, a Learjet 35, and a B-25 bomber converted into a camera platform. Three Mitsubishi A6M Zero replicas, originally built for the film Tora! Tora! Tora! (1970), were flown by pilots from the Confederate Air Force, now called the Commemorative Air Force. Two of the replicas were featured in a dogfight with F-14 Tomcats; it was the first time such a dissimilar engagement had appeared in film, with the "totally different speeds...environments and weaponry" of the aircraft causing extreme challenges for the jet pilots.

In one scene where an F-14 "thumps" a Zero by flying under and streaking upward in front of the slower aircraft, the resultant "jet blast" of turbulent air was so intense that the yokes of both of the Zeros in the scene were violently wrenched out of the pilots' hands and caused both aircraft to momentarily tumble out of control. (Note: At the conclusion of the dogfight scene, by sheer chance, the two Zeros spun away from each other, avoiding a midair collision.) The lead pilot's headset, along with his watch, were ripped off and out of the open canopy of his Zero, resulting in a few anxious moments as the F-14 pilots were unable to establish contact. During a scene when a Zero fires on an F-14 piloted by then-LCDR Richard "Fox" Farrell , in order to get on the "six" of the low and slow Zero—that is, to bring one's aircraft directly behind the target aircraft in a position corresponding to six o'clock on an analog clock face—the jet fighter did a low pull up that ended just 100 feet (30 m) above the ocean in a screaming recovery. (Note: In the final edit, the sound of the F-14 was actually punctuated by the scream of Farrell's wife when she saw the daily rushes, interspersed by the sound editor into the high-pitched afterburner whine. This scene has now become part of the urban legend of the film, described as a pilot's "death plunge".) At one point during filming, one of the Tomcat aircrews held up a sign with a profane message addressed to Katharine Ross in retaliation for the actress denying a request from the VF-84 crews to meet her in a hotel the previous day. The shot made it into the dailies and reportedly infuriated Ross.

During the climactic attack on Pearl Harbor, scenes reproduced in monochrome from Tora! Tora! Tora! featured Aichi D3A Val dive bombers, Mitsubishi A6M Zero fighters and Nakajima B5N Kate torpedo bombers. (Note: Several later films and TV series relating to World War II in the Pacific have used footage from Tora! Tora! Tora! due to the film's "almost perfect documentary accuracy". These productions include Midway, Pearl (TV miniseries 1978), From Here to Eternity (TV miniseries 1979), the Magnum P. I. episode "Lest We Forget" that aired on February 12, 1981, and Australia (2008).)

=== Aircraft appearing in the production ===
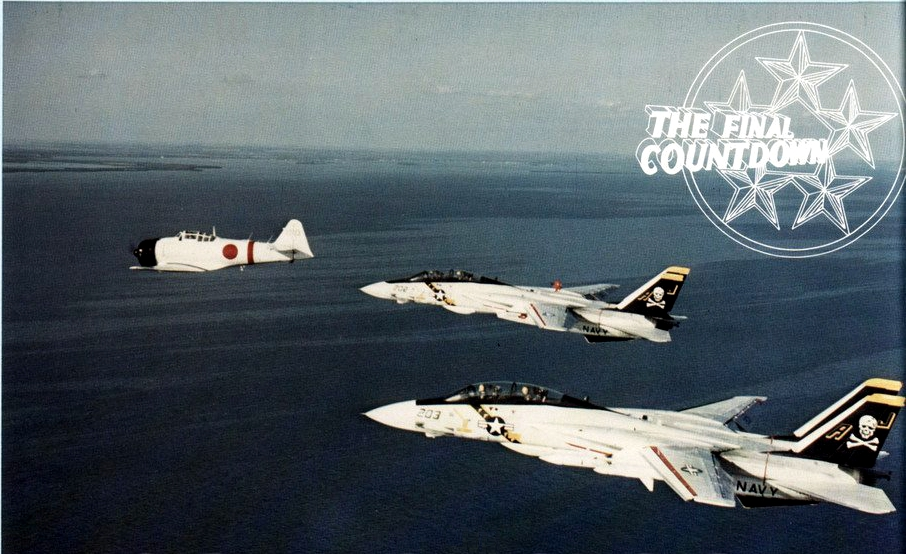
Tomcats from VF-84 with a T-6 converted to resemble a Zero

- Douglas EA-3B Skywarrior
- Grumman F-14A Tomcat
- Grumman E-2 Hawkeye
- Grumman A-6E Intruder
- Grumman EA-6B Prowler
- Lockheed S-3 Viking
- LTV A-7E Corsair II
- McDonnell Douglas F-4 Phantom II (briefly)
- North American RA-5C Vigilante Buno: 156632 (briefly)
- North American T-6 Texan modified to resemble Mitsubishi A6M Zero
- North American T-6 Texan modified to resemble Nakajima B5N Kate
- Sikorsky SH-3 Sea King
- Vought RF-8G Crusader
- Vultee BT-13 Valiant modified to resemble Aichi D3A Val

== Release ==
The Final Countdown was released to theaters in the United States on August 1, 1980. A novelization by Martin Caidin, based on the screenplay, was released in the same month and largely dovetailed with the film presented on screen (the novelization ending with Lasky accompanying Tideman/CDR Owens and Laurel to their home, where it is revealed that the time travel phenomenon explored in the film had an extraterrestrial origin that is not further expanded upon).

=== Home media ===
The film was released on DVD on March 30, 2004. It was later released by Blue Underground on a two-DVD set (with both full-screen and widescreen formats) and a special two-disc limited edition set with a hologram cover. Each DVD edition was accompanied by special featurettes, including a "behind-the-scenes" documentary and a commentary track by the producer and other studio principals. These THX certified releases also feature a Dolby Digital 5.1 EX audio track, as well as a DTS 6.1 ES audio track. On November 4, 2008, a high-definition two-disc Blu-ray set was released, but lacked some of the earlier background materials. A 4K Ultra High-Definition disc set was released in May 2021 as a limited edition with some additional special features, a copy of the film on Blu-ray disc and a copy of John Scott's original motion picture score on CD.

== Reception ==
=== Critical reception ===
The Final Countdown received mixed reviews from critics. On the review aggregator website Rotten Tomatoes, the film received an approval rating of 57% based on 22 reviews, with an average rating of 5.90/10. Metacritic, which uses a weighted average, assigned the film a score of 51 out of 100, based on 9 critics, indicating "mixed or average" reviews.

Vincent Canby of The New York Times considered it more of an interesting, behind-the-scenes tour of Nimitz: "We see planes landing and taking off with beautiful precision and, just to let us know that things don't always run smoothly on Nimitz, we also see one plane, which has lost its landing hook, landing safely anyway because of the ship's emergency gear". (Note: When the production crew learned that an emergency landing was imminent, they quickly set up for photography; the A-7 aircraft was safely recovered.) Roger Ebert of The Chicago Sun-Times gave the film 2 out of 4 stars, saying it had some entertaining scenes and was technologically impressive but the convoluted story “didn’t make much sense [and] biggest element of interest is the aircraft carrier itself". Later reviews concentrated on the intriguing aspect of the time travel story, again stressing that the military hardware was the real star. The U.S. Navy sponsored the film premiere and exploited the film as a recruiting tool to the extent that the theatrical poster appeared in U.S. Navy recruiting offices shortly after the film's release. Ebert and Gene Siskel selected the film as one of their "dogs of the year" in a 1980 episode of Sneak Previews, criticizing the characters' repeated failure to draw obvious conclusions and take obvious actions, the numerous slow stretches, and the anticlimax of the film ending without the soldiers actually going into battle.

Christopher John reviewed The Final Countdown in Ares Magazine #5 and commented that "there is nothing wrong with what is on the screen in Final Countdown; what is on the screen, however, is only half of the film. Maybe someday, like Close Encounters of the Third Kind, someone will go back and put in the missing half-hour of this movie".

=== Box office ===
The film grossed $3.25 million in its opening weekend from 681 screens and earned a total of $16.6 million in the United States and Canada.

The film made $3 million in Germany.

== Awards ==
- Nominee, Best Science Fiction Film of Year—Saturn Award (Peter Vincent Douglas)
- Nominee, Best Actor—Saturn Award (Kirk Douglas)
- Winner, Golden Screen Award (German box office award)

== See also ==
- Axis of Time trilogy
- G.I. Samurai
- Operation Rainbow – a.k.a. the Philadelphia Experiment, which inspired the film of the latter name
- The Philadelphia Experiment – the reverse story (World War II-era Navy personnel transported through time to the 1980s)
- Zipang

== Sources ==
- Caidin, Martin. The Final Countdown. New York: Bantam, 1980. ISBN 0-553-12155-3.
- Dolan, Edward F. Jr. Hollywood Goes to War. London: Bison Books, 1985. ISBN 0-86124-229-7.
- Frietas, Gary A. War Movies: The Belle & Blade Guide to Classic War Videos. Bandon, Oregon: Robert D. Reed Publishers, 2011. ISBN 978-1-931741-38-5.
- Kaufman, Lloyd, Trent Haaga, and Adam Jahnke. Make Your Own Damn Movie!: Secrets of a Renegade Director. Los Angeles: L.A. Weekly Books, 2003. ISBN 978-0-312288-648.
- Suid, Lawrence H. Guts & Glory: The Making of the American Military Image in Film. Lexington, Kentucky: The University Press of Kentucky, 2002. ISBN 978-0-8131-9018-1.
- Toland, John. Infamy: Pearl Harbor and its Aftermath. New York: Berkley, 1991. ISBN 978-0-42509-040-4.
