= Inherit the Wind (1988 film) =

1988 American TV movie

- Genre: Legal drama
- Based on: Inherit the Wind; 1955 play by: Jerome Lawrence; Robert E. Lee
- Written by: John Gay
- Directed by: David Greene
- Starring: Kirk Douglas; Jason Robards; Darren McGavin; Jean Simmons
- Music by: Arthur B. Rubinstein
- Country of origin: United States
- Original language: English

Production
- Executive producer: Peter Douglas
- Producer: Robert A. Papazian
- Cinematography: Stevan Larner
- Editor: Parkie Singh
- Running time: 96 minutes
- Production companies: Vincent Pictures Productions; MGM/UA Television

Original release
- Network: NBC
- Release: March 20, 1988

Inherit the Wind is a 1988 American legal drama television film directed by David Greene and written by John Gay, based on the 1955 play of the same name by Jerome Lawrence and Robert E. Lee. The film stars Kirk Douglas, Jason Robards, Darren McGavin and Jean Simmons. It aired on NBC on March 20, 1988.

The original play was written as a parable which fictionalized the 1925 Scopes "Monkey" Trial as a means of discussing the 1950s McCarthy trials. This version differed from the two previous films by attempting to make Brady more sympathetic and the storyline (according to its producers) "a bit more fair to both sides."

When announced in early 1987, the film was to co-star Douglas and Gregory Peck, under the title The Monkey Trial.

== Cast ==
- Jason Robards as Henry Drummond
- Kirk Douglas as Matthew Harrison Brady
- Darren McGavin as E. K. Hornbeck
- Jean Simmons as Lucy Brady
- Kyle Secor as Bertram Cates
- Michael Ensign as Rev. Brown
- Megan Follows as Rachel Brown

== Awards ==
Emmy Awards

- Won: Outstanding Drama/Comedy Special - Peter Douglas (executive producer) and Robert Papazian (producer)
- Won: Outstanding Lead Actor in a Miniseries or a Special - Jason Robards
- Nominated: Outstanding Cinematography for a Miniseries or a Special - Stevan Larner

== See also ==
- List of American films of 1988
- Trial movies

== External links and references ==
- Inherit the Wind at IMDb
- Inherit the Wind at the TCM Movie Database (archived)
