= Peter Douglas =

American film producer

- Born: Peter Vincent Douglas; November 23, 1955 (age 70); Los Angeles, California, U.S.
- Occupations: Television and film producer
- Years active: 1958–present
- Spouse: Lisa Schroeder (m. 1991)
- Children: 4
- Parent(s): Kirk Douglas (father); Anne Buydens (mother)
- Relatives: Michael Douglas (half-brother); Joel Douglas (half-brother); Eric Douglas (brother); Cameron Douglas (half-nephew)

Peter Vincent Douglas (born November 23, 1955) is an American television and film producer. He is the third son of actor Kirk Douglas, and the first by his second wife, German-American producer Anne Buydens. Douglas worked closely with his father and became president of The Bryna Company, an independent film and television production company formed by Kirk Douglas in 1949. In 1978, he formed his own film production company, Vincent Pictures.

Douglas won a Primetime Emmy Award for Outstanding Drama/Comedy Special in 1988 for his production of Inherit the Wind, which co-starred his father and Jason Robards. He had been nominated for the same award two years prior for his production of Amos, which also starred his father.

== Life and career ==
Peter Douglas was born in Los Angeles, California, on November 23, 1955. His middle name was given in homage to Vincent van Gogh, whom his father was portraying in a film version being shot in Europe at the time of his birth. The film in question, Lust for Life, was later released in 1956. In 1958, his father named his new music publishing company, Peter Vincent Music Corporation (a subsidiary of Bryna Productions), after his son, while Peter later named his own independent film production company Vincent Pictures. In 1958, a young Peter was seen on the television program This Is Your Life, which was honoring the life and career of his father.

Douglas' early work in the film industry was tied to his father, namely through his independent film production company, Bryna Productions. As a child, Douglas had uncredited bit parts in his father's films The Vikings and Stranger When We Meet (in which Kirk Douglas both starred and produced). Douglas went to high school at a military academy in Southern California.

In the early 1970s, Douglas studied photography at the Los Angeles Art Center. In June 1972, aged 17, Douglas was hired by his father as the still photographer when The Bryna Company produced Scalawag on location in Yugoslavia. His father produced, directed, and starred in the film, while his mother, Anne, was co-producer; his younger brother, Eric, was the producer's assistant, and their family dog, Shaft, had a part in the film. During the production of Scalawag, actress Lesley-Anne Down posed nude for Peter and the pictures were sold to Playboy magazine. Douglas again served as still photographer when his family traveled from Yugoslavia to England for The Bryna Company's television musical film Dr. Jekyll and Mr. Hyde. Pictures taken by Douglas of the character's transformation were used on the cover of Los Angeles Times' TV Times section on March 4, 1973.

Douglas attended the University of California at Santa Barbara for a year and a half but ultimately dropped out to focus on photography and motion picture work. In November 1973, Douglas photographed his brother Michael and his at-the-time girlfriend Brenda Vaccaro in their Benedict Canyon home for publication in several leading magazines. He also became Olympic swimmer Mark Spitz's official photographer. In March 1974, Douglas formed his own photographic service company and photography studio, Bryna International, and was represented by talent agent Phyllis Carlyle through her agency A-Plus. Carlyle landed Douglas photography contracts for such publications as Cosmopolitan and large advertisement agencies. In June 1974, Douglas photographed Frank Sinatra cooking a special Italian dinner for his parents' anniversary and the pictures were used in several publications.

For The Bryna Company's next picture, Posse, filmed from September to November 1974, Douglas served as post-production supervisor. Douglas then began working on the development of Ray Bradbury's Something Wicked This Way Comes, which would take nine years to complete and was eventually filmed as a coproduction between The Bryna Company and Walt Disney Productions. Douglas also worked as a producer's assistant at Columbia Pictures during the mid-to-late 1970s.

Peter Douglas' television production credits include Inherit the Wind (1988), for which he won the Emmy Award for Outstanding Drama or Comedy Special, and Amos (1984), which was also Emmy-nominated in the same category. His motion picture credits include the science-fiction time-travel classic The Final Countdown (1980), in which his father starred, and the adaptation of the classic Ray Bradbury novel Something Wicked This Way Comes (1983), which won the Saturn Award for Best Fantasy Film. He also produced the suspense-comedy hit Fletch (1985), as well as its sequel Fletch Lives (1989), both starring Chevy Chase. In December 1985, it was reported that Peter Douglas and Michael Phillips were working on developing a film from Isaac Asimov's novel The End of Eternity for Tri-Star Pictures. The property would remain in development for several years but was never filmed.

Douglas wrote, directed, and produced the independent film A Tiger's Tale (1988), starring Ann-Margret. He was the executive producer of the HBO Drama thriller The Enemy Within, starring Forest Whitaker and Jason Robards, and was also executive producer of the 2009 motion picture Whip It starring Drew Barrymore and Elliot Page.

Douglas married Lisa Schroeder in 1991. They have four children.

In 2012, Vincent Pictures announced that Peter Douglas was working on a remake of the 1966 film Grand Prix, which his father executive produced through Douglas and Lewis Productions.

== Filmography ==
Year	Title	Role(s)
1958	The Vikings	Actor (as Young Boy, uncredited)
1960	Strangers When We Meet	Actor (as Child at Amusement Park, uncredited)
1973	Dr. Jekyll and Mr. Hyde	Still photographer
1973	Scalawag	Still photographer
1975	Posse	Post-production supervisor
1980	The Final Countdown	Producer, actor (as Quartermaster)
1983	Something Wicked This Way Comes	Producer
1985	Fletch	Producer
1985	Amos	Producer
1987	A Tiger's Tale	Director, writer, producer
1988	Inherit the Wind	Executive producer
1989	Fletch Lives	Producer
1994	The Enemy Within	Executive producer
2009	Whip It	Producer
