= Scalawag (film) =

1973 film by Kirk Douglas

- Theatrical release poster
- Directed by: Kirk Douglas
- Written by: Sid Fleischman; Albert Maltz
- Produced by: Anne Buydens
- Starring: Kirk Douglas; Mark Lester; Neville Brand; George Eastman; Don Stroud; Lesley-Anne Down
- Cinematography: Jack Cardiff
- Edited by: John C. Howard; Antonietta Zita
- Music by: John Cameron
- Production company: The Bryna Company
- Distributed by: Paramount Pictures
- Release dates: May 30, 1973 (Italy); October 16, 1973 (U.S.); December 4, 1973 (Yugoslavia)
- Running time: 92 minutes
- Countries: Italy, U.S., Yugoslavia
- Language: English

Scalawag is a 1973 film directed by Kirk Douglas, his first of two films directed, the other being Posse. The film is a western re-telling of Treasure Island by Robert Louis Stevenson.

== Cast ==
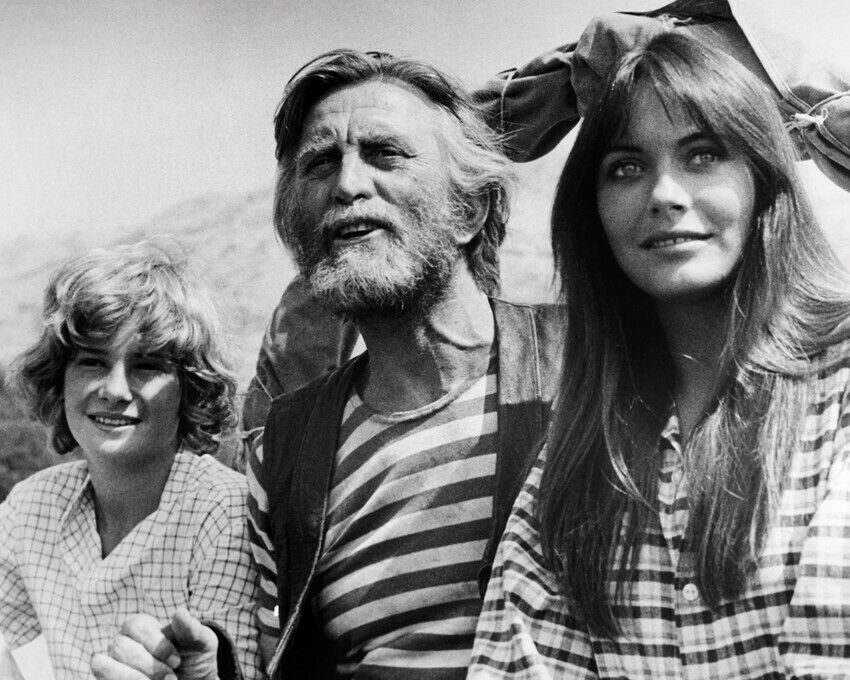
A still of Lester, Douglas, and Lesley-Anne Down.

- Kirk Douglas as John "Captain Peg" Pettibone Stewart
- Mark Lester as Jamie Hardy
- Neville Brand as Brimstone / Mudhook
- George Eastman as Don Aragon
- Don Stroud as Velvet
- Lesley-Anne Down as Lucy-Ann Hardy
- Danny DeVito as Fly Speck
- Mel Blanc as Barfly the Parrot (voice)
- Phil Brown as Sandy
- Davor Antolić as Rooster
- Stole Arandelović as Beanbelly
- Fabijan Sovagović as Blackfoot
- Shaft Douglas as Beau
- Vladimir Medar as Captain of the Painted Lady

== Production ==
The film was based on an original story by Albert Maltz. It was announced in 1966 and was going to be a co production between Kirk Douglas' Joel Production and Malcolm Stuart's Coldwater Productions. Douglas would star. It would be the first time Maltz would receive screen credit in 19 years.

Filming was delayed. Douglas raised the money. He hired his wife Anne Buydens as producer, his son Peter as stills photographer and his son Eric as office boy. "So if this film stinks we've got the whole Douglas family to blame," said Douglas. He added, "My phone doesn't ring any more. I have to find my own work."

In 1972, Douglas said he would produce and direct it as well as star and that the script was by Sid Fleischman. Filming was to start in Yugoslavia in June 1972. By May, the cast included Mark Lester, Lesley-Anne Down and Danny DeVito. Douglas said he rewrote the screenplay.

"I wanted to get back the old feeling of movies I experienced as a kid," said Douglas, "pirates, derring-do, people getting killed, but you don't see any blood." "It's a version of Treasure Island set in the old West on horseback," said Douglas. "There's adventure, violence, and there's romance - a girl sings a romantic song while dreaming of a good looking guy. Yes it's old fashioned but that's what I liked as a kid. I guess I haven't lost either my love of romance or my sense of innocence."

Douglas said, "There was no pretentiousness about" the shoot. "We lived under primitive conditions with no toilets and learned one Yugoslavian phrase to save our lives - 'Bex bela luka'. That means 'no garlic'. You see old movies on the Late Show and everybody asks why they don't make movies like that anymore. Critics have made it fashionable to be pretentious and incoherent."
