= Statistical Accounts of Scotland =

Series of documentary publications

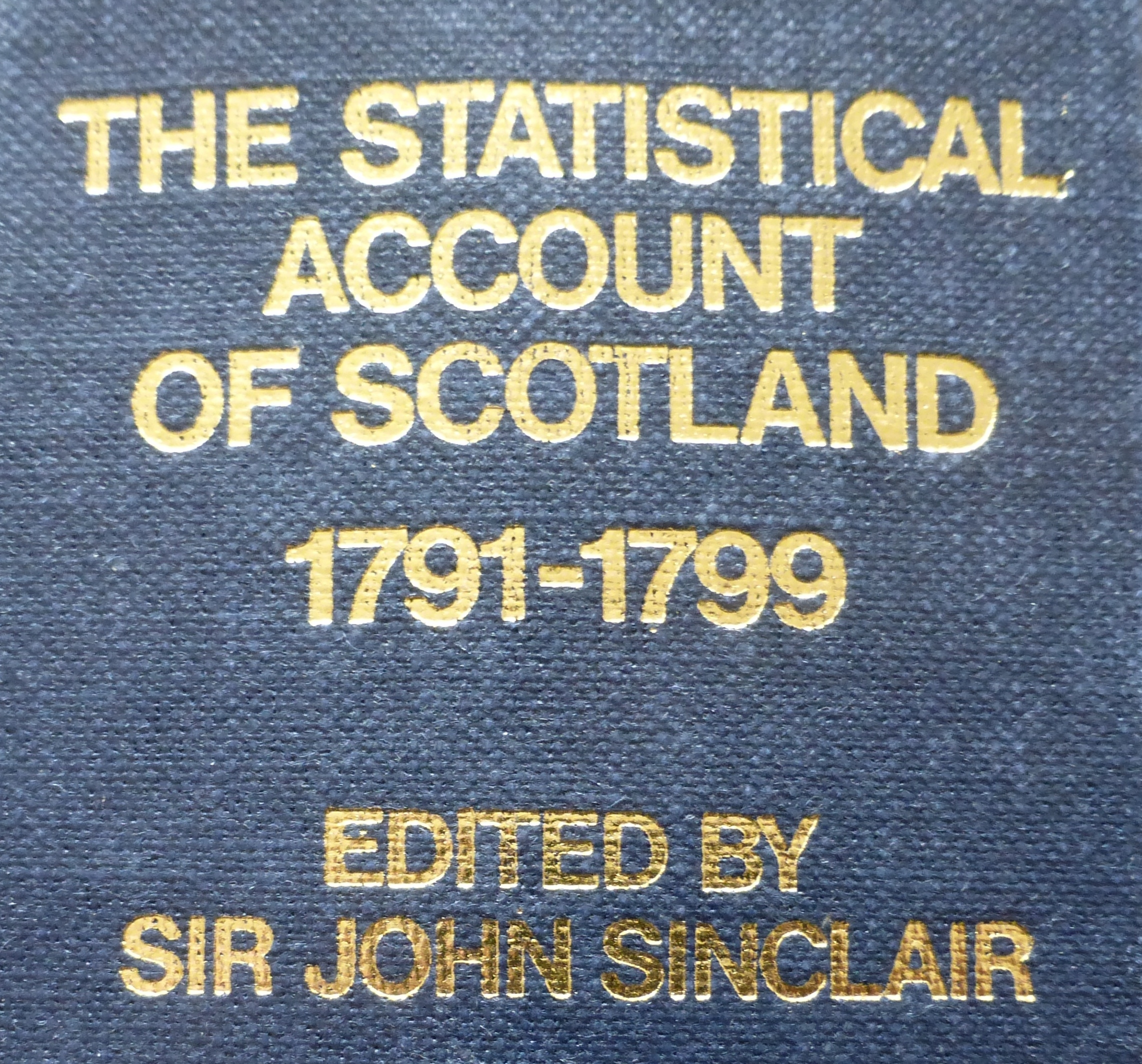
- Subject: Scotland
- Genre: Documentary publication

The Statistical Accounts of Scotland are a series of documentary publications, related in subject matter though published at different times, covering life in Scotland in the 18th, 19th and 20th centuries.

The Old (or First) Statistical Account of Scotland was published between 1791 and 1799 by Sir John Sinclair of Ulbster. The New (or Second) Statistical Account of Scotland published under the auspices of the General Assembly of the Church of Scotland between 1834 and 1845. These first two Statistical Accounts of Scotland are among the finest European contemporary records of life during the agricultural and industrial revolutions.

A Third Statistical Account of Scotland was published between 1951 and 1992.

== Early attempts ==
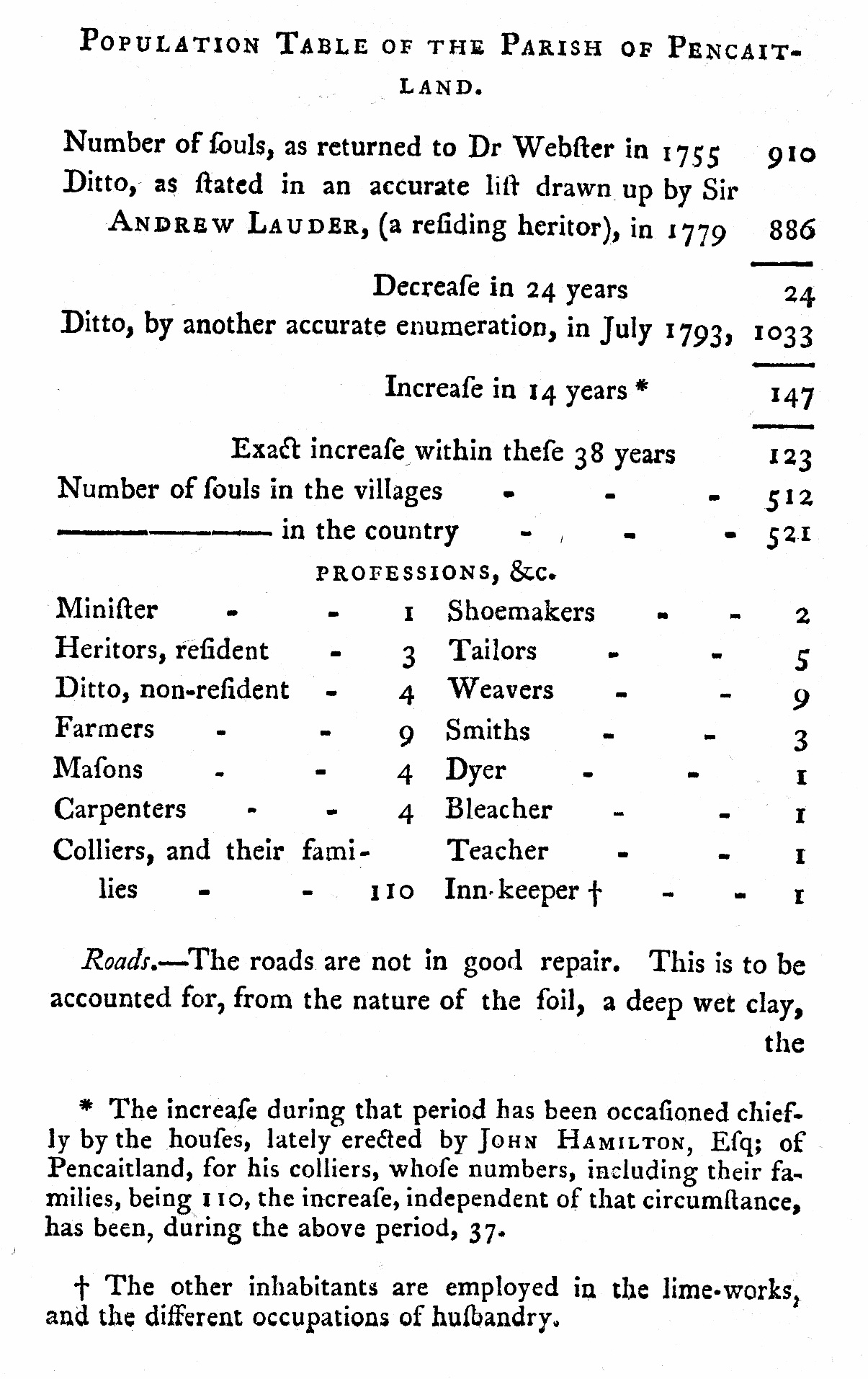
O.S.A. Population table for Pencaitland, East Lothian

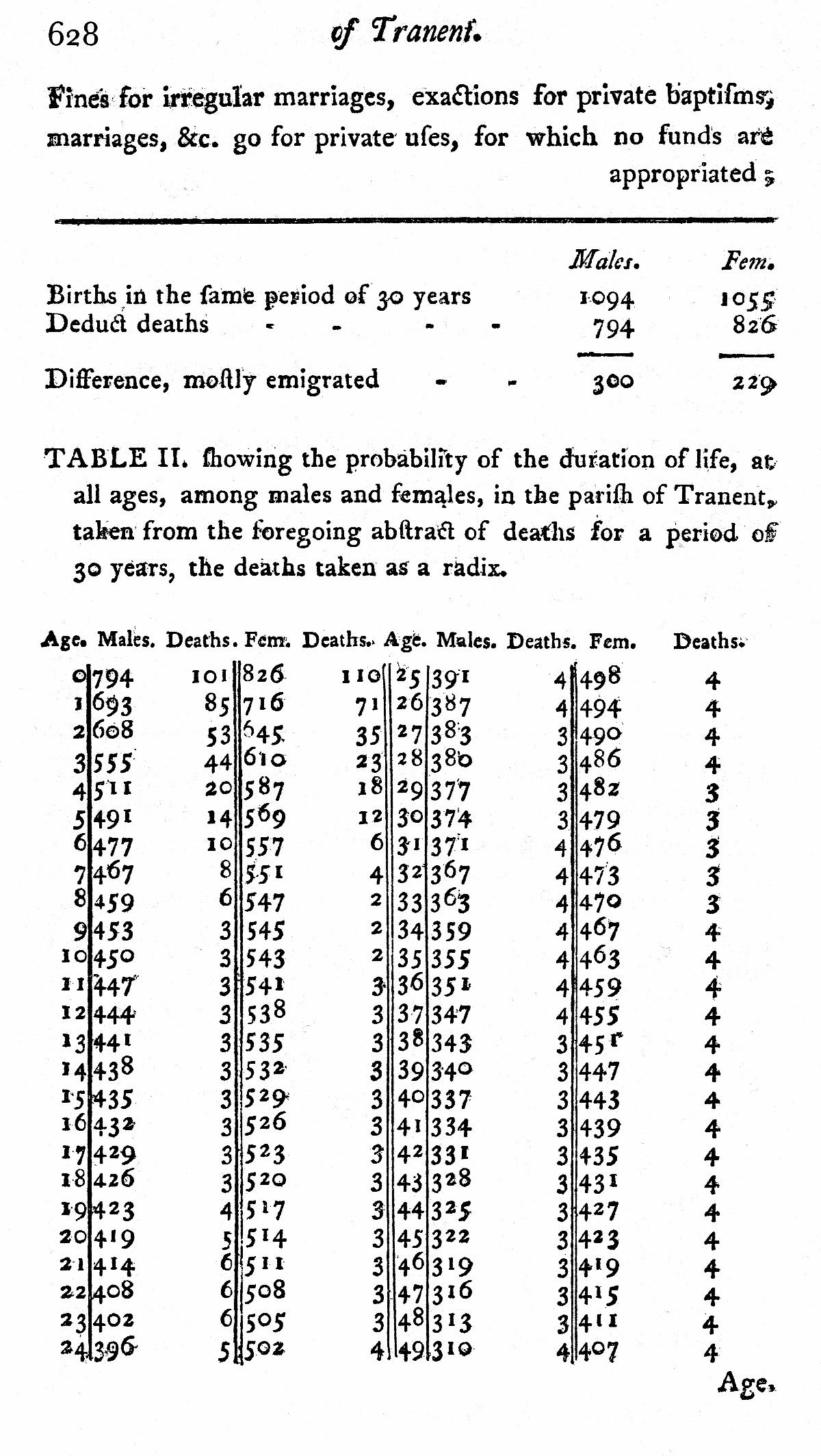
O.S.A. Life expectancy table for Tranent, East Lothian

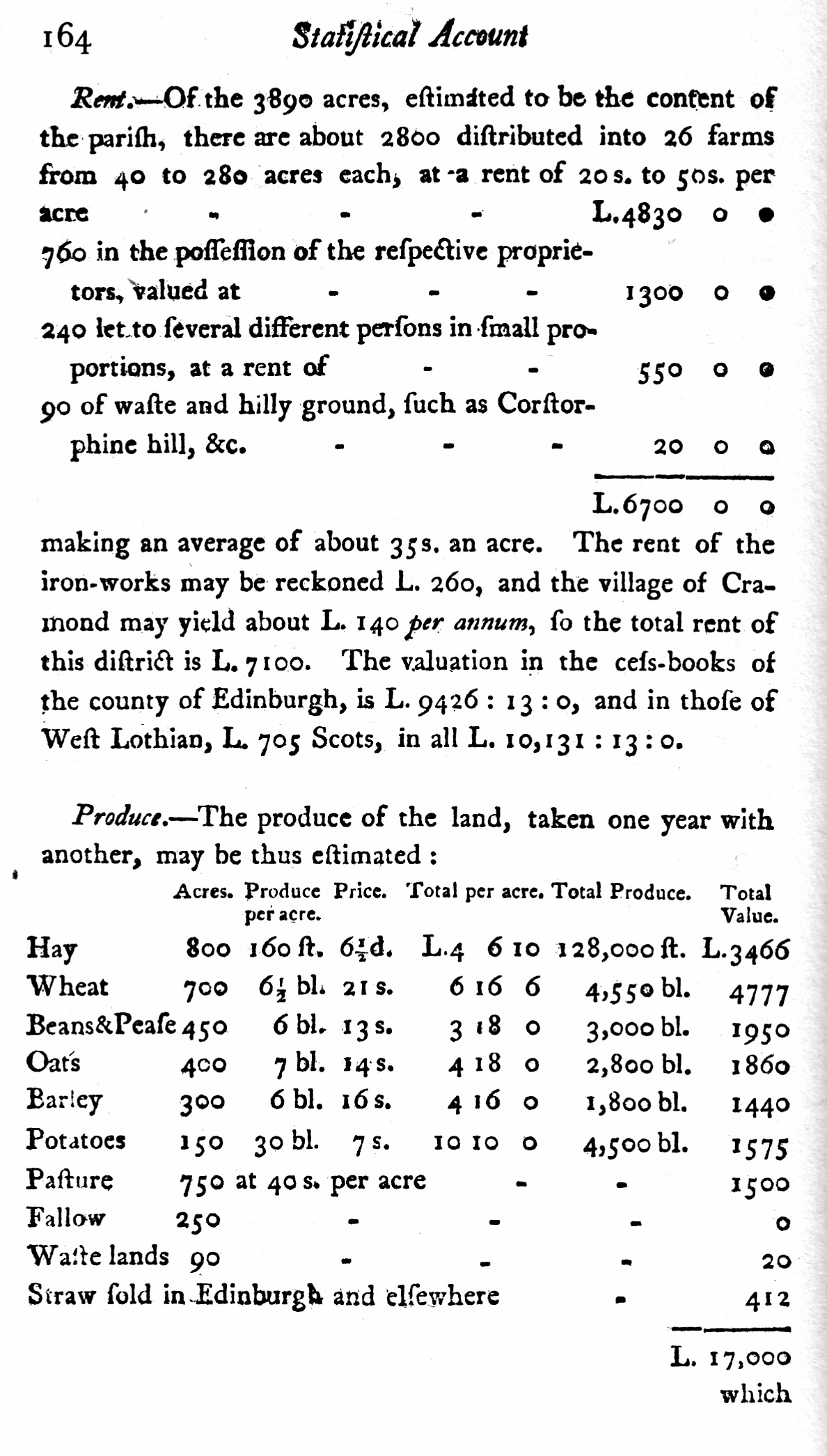
O.S.A. Rent & Produce for Cramond, Midlothian

Attempts at getting an accurate picture of the geography, people and economy of Scotland had been attempted in the 1620s and 1630s, using the network of about 900 ministers of the established Church of Scotland. The time and resources involved, not to mention the troubled times of the Civil Wars, led to limited results.

=== Sir Robert Sibbald (1684–1690s) ===
However, the Geographer Royal for Scotland, Sir Robert Sibbald took this forward between 1684 and the early 1690s. Sir Robert circulated some "General Queries" to parish ministers, but again this was the unsettled time of the Glorious Revolution and, though progress was made, the results provided a very incomplete picture of the nation.

=== The General Assembly of the Church of Scotland (1720–1755) ===
The General Assembly proposed a "Geographical Description of Scotland" and took some action on this between 1720 and 1744, again during troubled times for the country, latterly involving the Jacobite rebellion under Bonnie Prince Charlie. Nonetheless, during 1743, the Moderator of the General Assembly, the Rev Robert Wallace organised the distribution of questionnaires, aimed at finding out how to devise a scheme for the support of the widows and orphans of clergy. This work helped to develop actuarial methods, and explains the involvement of a society for ministers' widows and orphans in later work.

The Rev Alexander Webster produced a population census of Scotland in 1755, based to some extent on Wallace's work.

=== Sir James Steuart (1767) and David Erskine (1781) ===
In 1767, Sir James Denham-Steuart suggested a national survey in his "Enquiry into the principles of Œconomy" and this was taken up in 1781 by David Erskine, Earl of Buchan. However, by the time this came to fruition in 1792, it had been overtaken by the work of Sir John Sinclair of Ulbster.

== The First (Old) Statistical Account of Scotland ==
Sir John Sinclair of Ulbster had studied German state surveys and wished to use what he called for the first time these "statistical" methods to measure the quantum of happiness that existed in the nation and find ways of improving this. In this he was a remarkable example of Enlightenment idealism at work. He stressed the empirical ideal of that age by lauding its anxious attention to the facts and he set about completing the work left unachieved by the previous attempt mentioned above. The results are crucial to an understanding of Scotland on the eve of both the Industrial Revolution and the French Revolution.

In 1790, Sir John sent structured questionnaires to over 900 parish ministers, covering the whole country. This contained 160 questions in 4 sections, namely

- Geography and topography
- Population
- Agricultural and Industrial production
- Miscellaneous questions

There were follow up questions in Appendices – six new questions in 1790 and four more in 1791. The general response was excellent, though the length and quality of submissions varied greatly, as can be seen by comparing those for two East Lothian parishes: Whittingehame (19 pages with detailed tables) and Stenton (2 pages of minimal information). Since the survey was not complete, Sir John sent out Statistical Missionaries in 1796 . The project was finished by June 1799, though much had already been published, and Sir John was able to lay before the General Assembly a detailed portrait of the nation. Taken as a whole, the reports are of inestimable historical value. Some are excellently written by ministers who were themselves meticulous Enlightenment scholars (see for example the response by the Rev Dr James Meek for the Parish of Cambuslang in Lanarkshire).

The finished volumes were published in Edinburgh by William Creech.

== The Second (New) Statistical Account of Scotland ==
As mentioned above, early attempts at producing an accurate statistical account of Scotland were related to schemes to support the widows and orphans of the clergy. In 1832 the Committee for the Society for the Sons and Daughters of the Clergy, with the blessing of the General Assembly of the Church of Scotland, took Sir John's work further. It was to be more modern (including maps for each county) and was to draw upon the specialist knowledge of local doctors and schoolmasters. It very self-consciously set out not to produce a new statistical account, but a statistical account of a new country – one that the revolutions mentioned above had changed rapidly. It was, however, very much the child of the "Old Statistical Account". Indeed, the Rev Dr John Robertson, the Minister responsible for the new account for Cambuslang, was the former assistant to the writer of the old account.

== The Third Statistical Account of Scotland ==
Following a grant of some £8,000 from the Nuffield Foundation in 1947, the Third Statistical Account was initiated, and followed a similar parish format to the earlier accounts. The first volume, covering Ayrshire, was published in 1951. Ultimately it was more rigorous and wide-ranging than either of its predecessors, covering industry, transport, culture and demographics. Volume editors ensured a more generic approach than before, but even so the spirit of the originals was retained, even if idiosyncrasies remained.

The scale of the project, ongoing difficulties with funding and finding publishers (which included Collins and Oliver & Boyd) meant that the project took over forty years to complete, with a gap of more than a decade following the publication of Edinburgh in 1966. It was not until 1992 that the last volume, The County of Roxburgh, was published, under the auspices of the Scottish Council for Voluntary Organisations. Another consequence of this delay was that the later volumes covered administrative divisions which no longer existed. Several parish accounts had to be revised or rewritten due to the lapse of time between the fieldwork and publication. One account, the parish of Livingston in West Lothian, was revised twice and all three versions appear in the published volume. The account for the parish of Currie went missing by the time the Midlothian volume was put together and the book appears without it.

Although the project was more secular than before, sections of the accounts continued to focus on religious life, and several of the parish accounts were still written by Church of Scotland ministers. The tone of the comments in the 'Way of Life' often appear surprisingly judgmental to a modern reader, and there can be ill-concealed exasperation with the behaviour of working-class parishioners. For example, again and again, spending on football pools is denounced, as are other ways of spending money and leisure time. Judgmentalism turns to plain insult in remarks like 'The people of Dura Den can be extremely ignorant' (Parish of Kemback, Fife) and 'Singing in the schools and the church is painful to an educated ear' (Parish of Inch, Wigtownshire).

Note: each volume is entitled either County of... or City of....

- Aberdeen (1953), MacKenzie, H.
- Aberdeenshire (1960), Hamilton, H.
- Angus (1977), Illsley, W.A.
- Argyll (1961), MacDonald, C.M.
- Ayrshire (1951), Strawhorn & Boyd
- Banffshire (1961), Hamilton, H.
- Berwickshire (1992), Herdman, J.
- Caithness (1961), Smith, J. S.
- Dumfriesshire (1962), Houston, G.
- Dunbartonshire (1959), Dilke, M.S. & Templeton, A.A.
- Dundee (1979), Jackson, J.M.
- East Lothian (1953), Snodgrass, Catherine P.
- Edinburgh (1966), Keir, D.
- Fife (1952), Smith, A.
- Glasgow (1958), Cunnison & Gilfillan
- Inverness-shire (1985), Barron, H.
- Stewartry of Kirkcudbright & Wigtownshire (1965), Laird, J. & Ramsay, D.G.
- Kincardineshire (1988), Smith, D.
- Lanarkshire (1960), Thomson, G.
- Midlothian (1985), Kirkland, H.
- Moray & Nairnshire (1965), Hamilton, H.
- Orkney (1985), Miller, R.
- Peeblesshire & Selkirkshire (1964), Bulloch, J.P.B. & Urquhart, J.M.
- Perthshire & Kinross-shire (1980), Taylor, D.B.
- Renfrewshire & Bute (1962), Moisley, H.A., Thain, A.G., Somerville, A.C. & Stevenson, W.
- Ross & Cromarty (1987), Mather, A.S.
- Roxburghshire (1992), Herdman, J.
- Shetland (1985), Coull, J.R.
- Stirlingshire & Clackmannanshire (1966), Rennie & Gordon
- Sutherland (1988), Smith, J. S. D.
- West Lothian (1992), Cadell, P.
