= Ronald Gordon =

Ronald Gordon may refer to:

- Ronald Gordon (bishop) (1927–2015), Anglican bishop
- Ronald Gordon (cricketer) (1876–1914), Scottish first-class cricketer
- Ron Gordon (Ronald F. Gordon), American entrepreneur and president of Atari (fl 1970s – 1980s)
