= John Henderson (architect) =

Scottish architect (1804-1862)

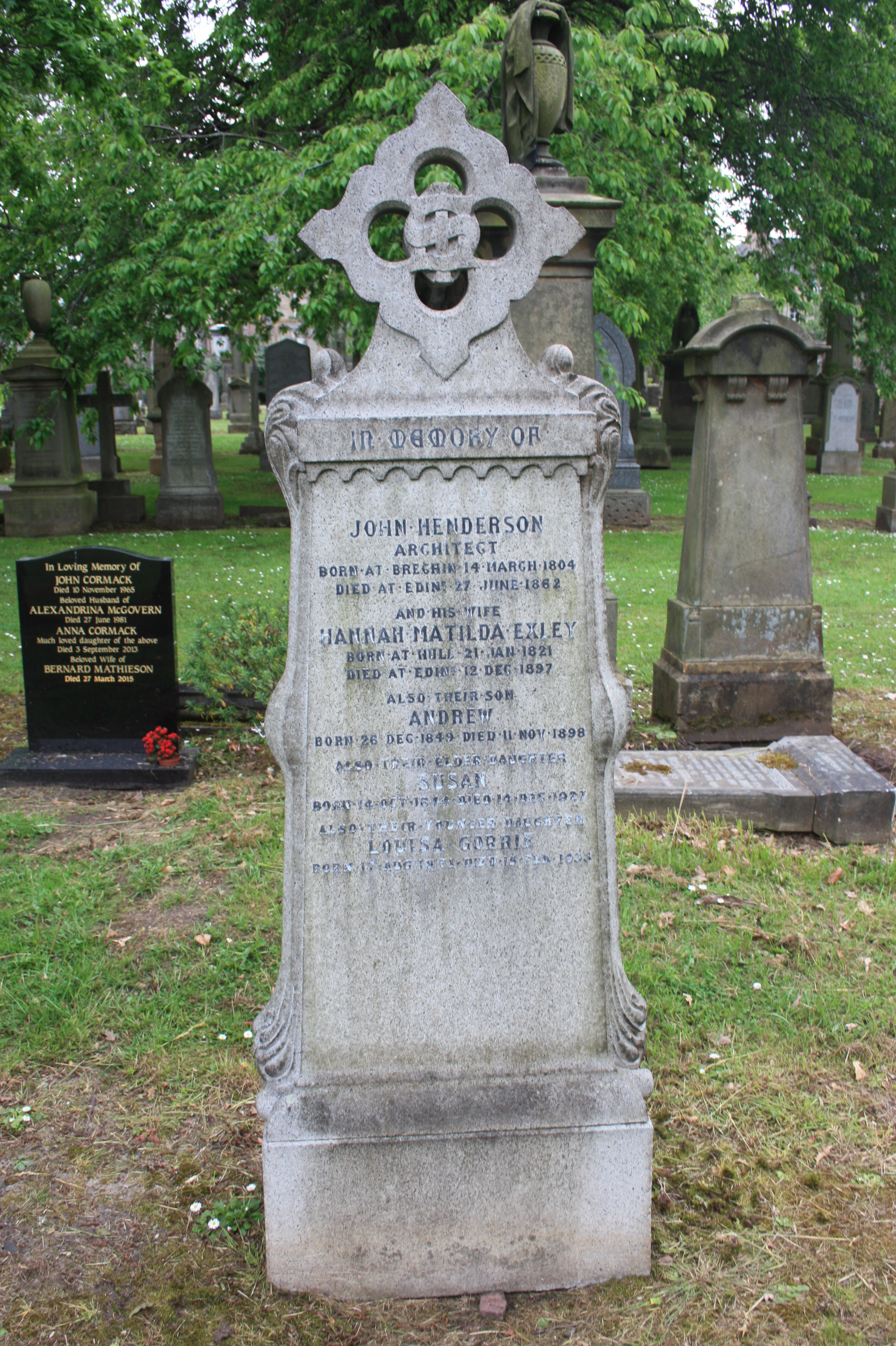
The grave of John Henderson, Grange Cemetery

John Henderson (1 March 1804 – 27 June 1862) was a Scottish architect operational in the mid-19th century. He is chiefly remembered as a church architect, with his early work being in the Gothic Revival and tractarian style, before developing his own distinct style.

== Life ==
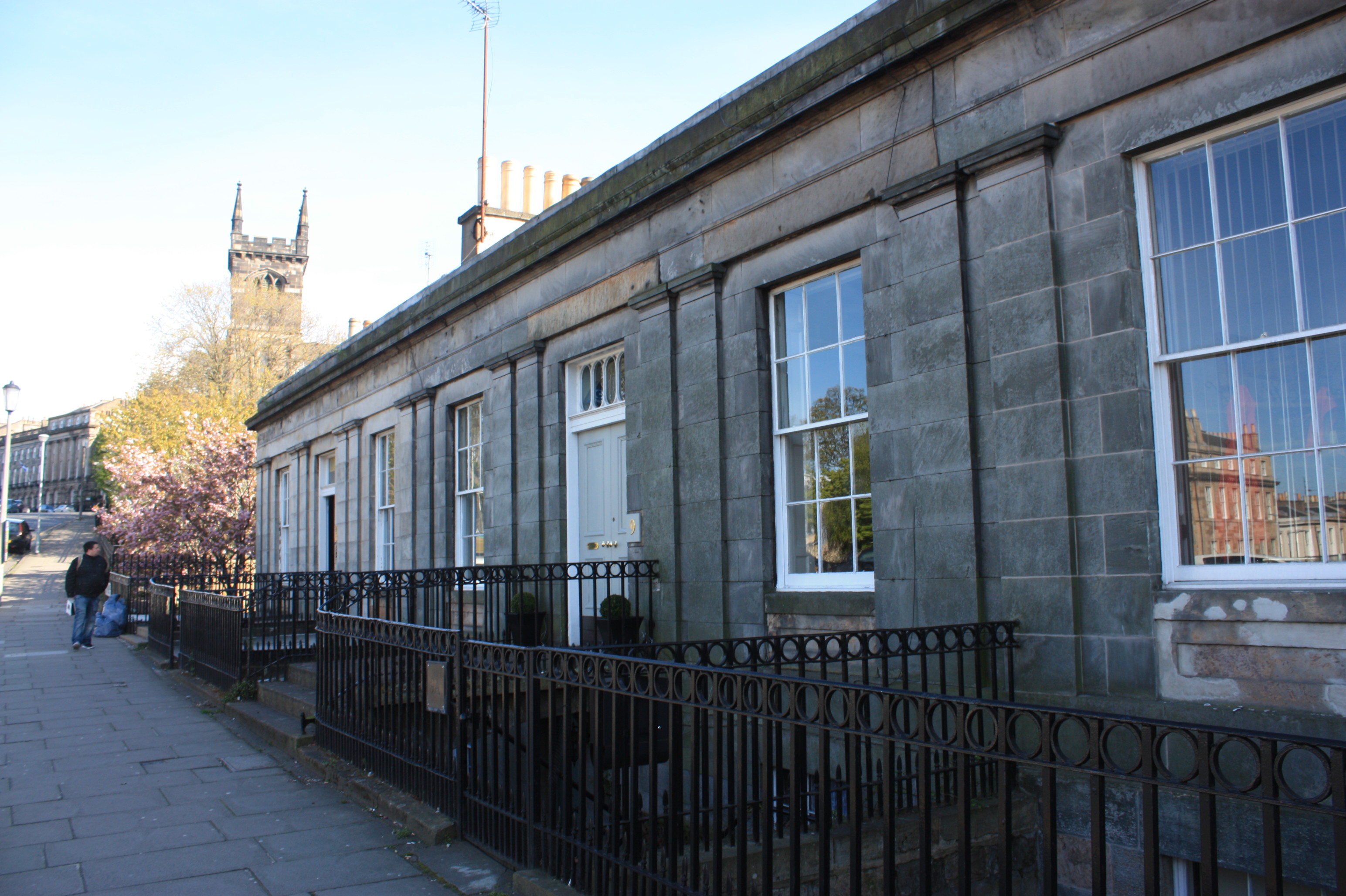
Henderson's first office at Blenheim Place, Edinburgh

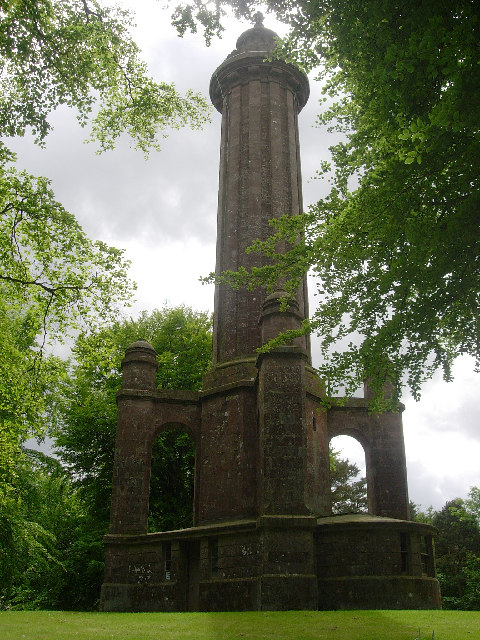
The Panmure Testimonial monument

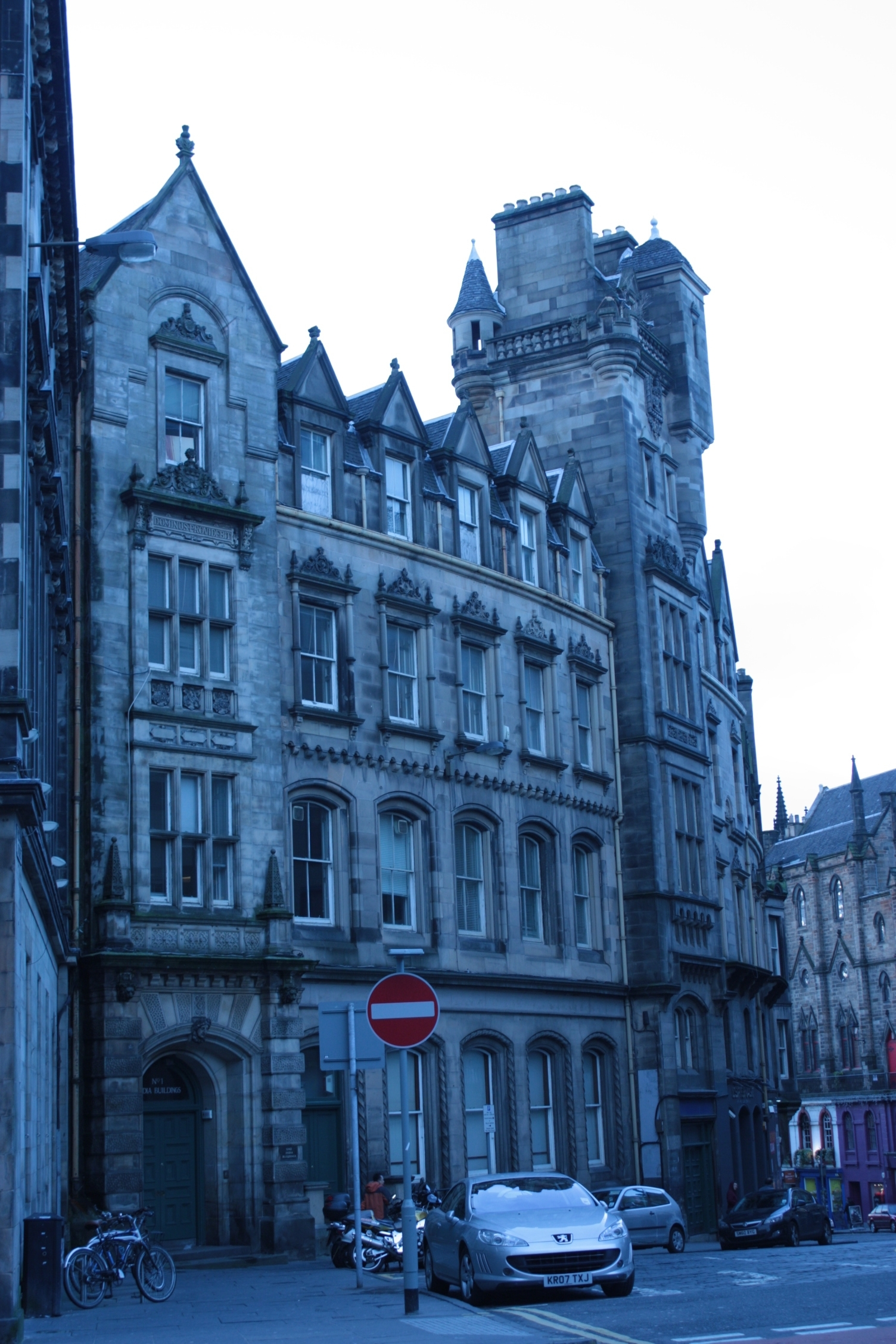
The India Buildings at the head of Victoria St, Edinburgh (completed by David Cousin)

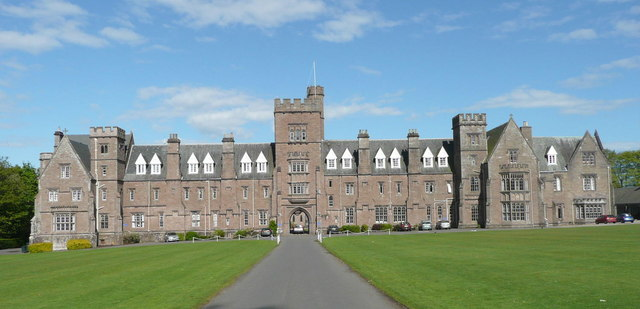
Glenalmond College

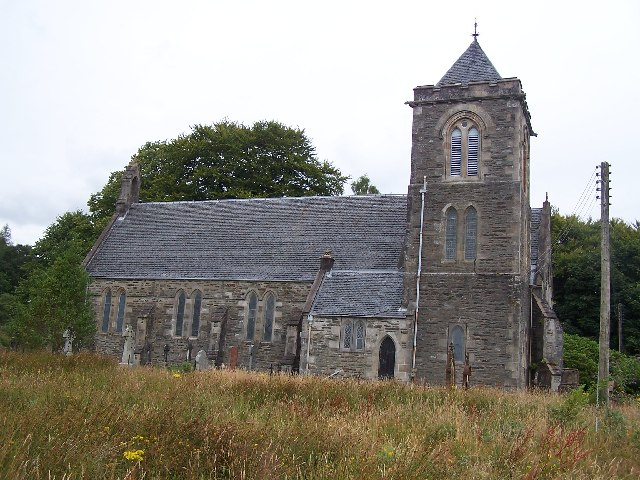
Holy Trinity Church, Dunoon

He was born at the Den Nursery in Brechin to John Henderson and Agnes Thomson. Henderson's father was a gardener for William Maule, 1st Baron Panmure, at Brechin Castle.

He was initially apprenticed as a carpenter but after completing this he pursued studies in drawing and building construction. His first design was for the addition of a steeple at the parish church in Arbroath in 1831. After completing this project, he became an assistant to architect Thomas Hamilton; a post he remained in until establishing his own architecture firm in 1833. This was set up at 1 Blenheim Place (next to R & R Dickson's office) before moving to 6 Union Street. In 1836, he relocated into more prestigious accommodation at 16 London Street, then was variously at 8 Duke Street (now called Dublin Street), 73 Queen Street (at his peak) and finally at 7 Hill Street.

He designed and oversaw the building of numerous churches in Scotland up until his death in 1862 at the age of 58. He also designed the original buildings for Glenalmond College. Several notable architects were trained by him, including Alexander Davidson, William Hay, John Milne, James Milne Monro, and his son George Henderson. On his father's death, Henderson's 16-year-old son completed his apprenticeship with David Cousin.

Henderson died at home, 7 Greenhill Park (a villa of his own design) in south-west Edinburgh on 27 June 1862, aged 58. He was buried in Grange Cemetery in south Edinburgh. The grave lies in the north-west section.

== Family ==
He was married to Hannah Matilda Exley (1821–1897). They had at least three children.

== Works ==
see

- Renewing steeple, Arbroath Parish Church (1831)
- Kirkmabreck Parish Church (1831)
- Samuel Douglas Free School, Newton Stewart (1834)
- Tenement 1-3 George IV Bridge, Edinburgh (1836)
- Christ Church Episcopal Church, Mile End, Glasgow (1836)
- Morningside Parish Church, Edinburgh (1836)
- Bannockburn Chapel of Ease (1837)
- Holy Trinity Scottish Episcopal Church, Dean Bridge, Edinburgh (1837)
- Natural History Museum, Montrose (1837)
- St Mary's Church, Dumfries (1837)
- Carnock Parish Church (1838)
- Tower and spire, Fettercairn Parish Church (1838)
- Lady Glenorchy's Church, Low Calton, Edinburgh (1838)
- Mechanic's Institute, Brechin (1838)
- Newhaven Parish Church (1838)
- Tenements, Granton Square, Edinburgh (1838)
- Granton Hotel (1838)
- Mariners Church, Commercial Street, Leith (1839) (now flatted)
- Panmure Testimonial (a monument to William Maule), Camustane Hill, Panmure (1839)
- Lodge and gates to Niddrie Marischal House, Edinburgh (1839)
- Monument to Bishop Alexander Jolly, Turriff Episcopal Church (1840)
- Maryburgh Church (1840)
- St Thomas Church, School, Manse and Female Asylum, Leith (1840) the church is now a Sikh Temple
- Fraserburgh Episcopal Church
- Burntisland Harbour: pier, workshops, houses and hotel (1841-3)
- North Church, Stirling (1841)
- Church Hill House, Edinburgh (1842)
- Feuing of Church Hill housing, Edinburgh (1842)
- Trinity College and hall, now called Glenalmond College (1843)
- Varrich House, Church Hill, Edinburgh (1843)
- Cuminestown Episcopal Church (1844)
- St Devenick's Manse, Banchory (1844)
- St Mary's Episcopal Church, Montrose (1844)
- St Mary's Episcopal Church, Dunblane (1844)
- Stirling Episcopal Church (1845)
- St Mary's Episcopal Church, Hamilton, Lanarkshire (1845)
- St Columba's Episcopal Church, Johnston Terrace, Edinburgh (1846)
- Feuing plan, Hope Park, St Andrews (1847)
- St Andrew's Episcopal Chapel, Fasque (1847)
- Holyrood Free Church, Edinburgh (1848)
- Meggernie Castle, Glenlyon (1848)
- St John's Episcopal Church, Cranstonhill, Glasgow (1848)
- St Philip's Episcopal Church, School, Hall and Rectory, Catterline, Kincardineshire (1848)
- Cairnies Farmhouse and Steading, Glenalmond (1848)
- All Saints Episcopal Church, Woodhead, Aberdeenshire (1849)
- Holy Trinity Episcopal Church and rectory, Kilbride Hill, Dunoon (1850)
- Remodelling of New Pitsligo Episcopal Church (1850)
- St Mary's Episcopal Church, Rectory and School, Ratho (1850)
- Christ Church Episcopal Church, Rectory and School, Lochgilphead (1851)
- West Linton Combined Episcopal Church and School (1851)
- Borthwick Hall, Heriot, Midlothian (1852)
- St Luke's Free Church, Queen Street, Edinburgh (1852) converted to gym
- St Margaret's Episcopal Church, Meigle, Perthshire (1852)
- Lady Elizabeth Ross Memorial, Kincardine Churchyard, Ardgay (1853)
- St Andrew's Episcopal School and Library, Brechin (1853)
- St Peter's Episcopal Church, Galashiels (1853)
- Villas, Greenhill Park, Edinburgh (1853) including 7 Greenhill Park as his own house
- St Michaels and All Saints Chapel, Inverkip (1854)
- Alterations to Brechin Castle (1854)
- Alterations to Carse Gray House, Forfar (1854)
- St Mary's Episcopal Church and Rectory, Arbroath (1854)
- Bridge over River Den to access Brechin Cemetery (1856)
- Holy Trinity Episcopal Church, Lamington, South Lanarkshire (1857)
- St Mary Episcopal Church, Rectory and School, Port Glasgow (1857)
- St Mungo's Episcopal Church and Rectory, East Linton (1857)
- Tenements School, Brechin (1857)
- Christ Episcopal Church, Lanark (1858)
- Feuing of Greenhill estate, Edinburgh (1858)
- St Peter's Episcopal Church and Rectory, Montrose (1858)
- Burgh Episcopal School, Galashiels (1859)
- India Buildings, Victoria Street, Edinburgh (1859) (works completed by David Cousin after Henderson's death)
- St Margaret's College, Crieff (1859)
