= John Milne (architect) =

Scottish architect

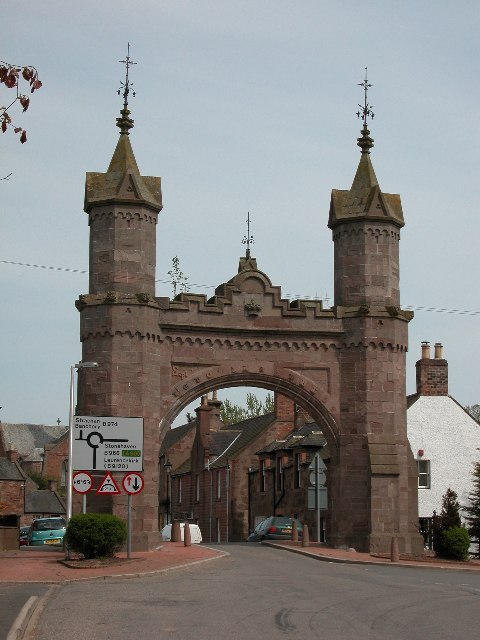
Royal Arch at Fettercairn by John Milne

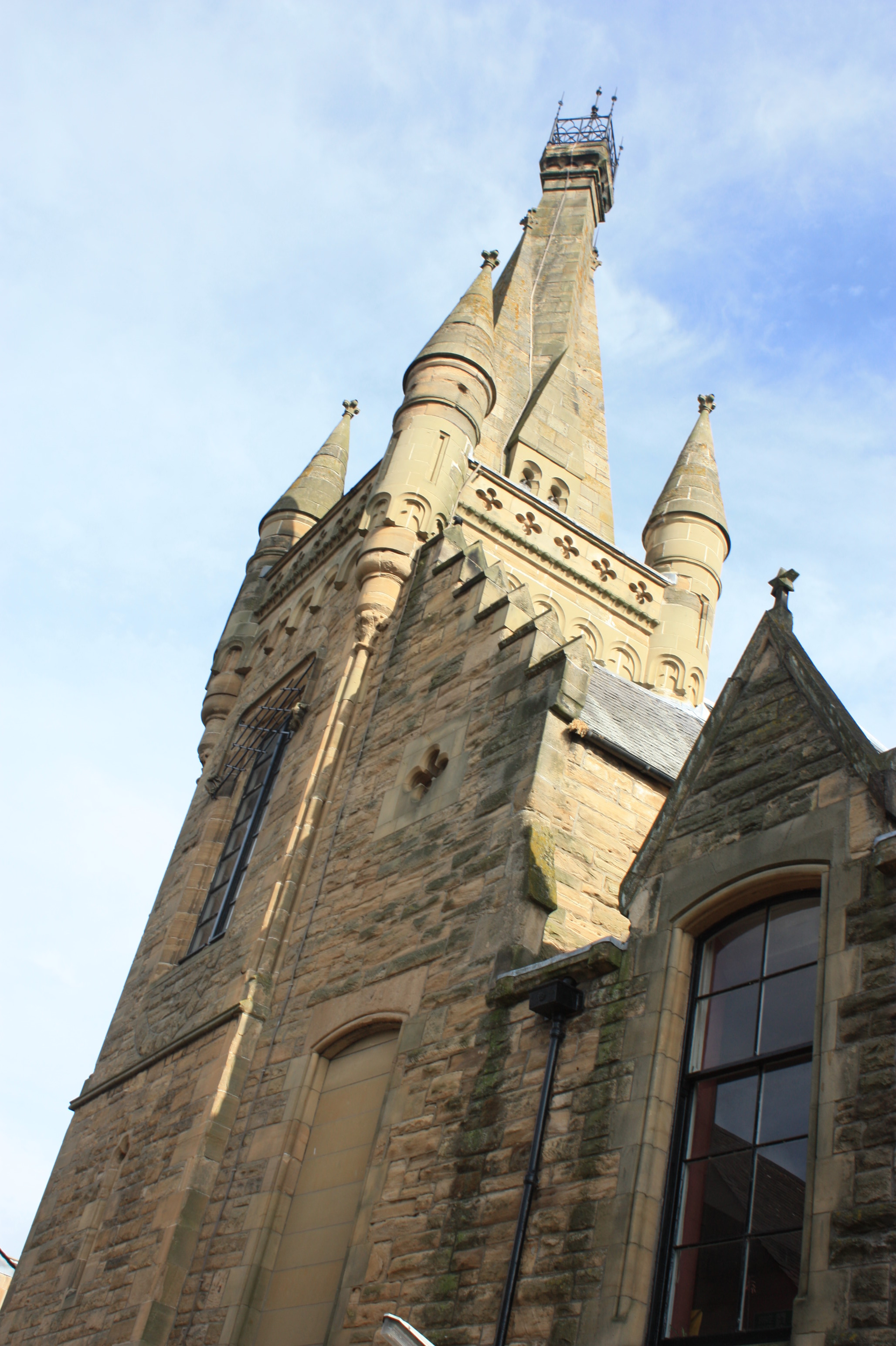
The tower of the Duncan Institute, Cupar

John Milne (1823–1904) was a Scottish architect operating throughout the second half of the 19th century, working largely in the Fife area. He was described as an ‘’inventive neo-Jacobean and Scots Baronial designer’’. He exhibited works at the Royal Scottish Academy in the 1860s. He was also an inventor of a pyro-pneumatic grate: a heating system for churches. He self-financed several improvement schemes to the town of St Andrews

== Life ==
He was born in Fettercairn in the north of Scotland, the son of a joiner and builder. He was apprenticed to John Henderson, an architect in Edinburgh, probably around 1838. He then transferred to the offices of David Bryce, probably around 1845, acting as Clerk of Works on Clatto House, near St Andrews. Milne settled in St Andrews and stayed there for the remainder of his life, operating from an office at 81 Market Street. At the time of the Disruption of the Church of Scotland, Milne ‘’came out’’ and left the established church to join the Free Church of Scotland. Thereafter many of his commissions came from the Free Church.

The majority of his works are within Fife other than a small handful in his native town of Fettercairn. In the mid 19th century he did several extension schemes for Leith Docks in combination with R & R Dickson.

He was an elected member of the Town Council in St Andrews and promoted several improvement schemes including extension of the Links Embankment and culverting of the old mill lade. When the council voted not to pay for the schemes he decided to pay for them himself. His project at the West Sands reclaimed twelve and a half acres of land for use as a public park. This was timed such as to be labelled as St Andrews Jubilee Scheme, marking Queen Victoria’s Golden Jubilee.

Over and above designing buildings, Milne also designed the graves of two of his fellow Town Councillors in St Andrews: Provost John Paterson and Baillie Ireland. Both are in the New Cemetery in St Andrews (south-east of the cathedral). He also designed the Pagan monument in Leuchars churchyard.

John Milne died in St Andrews in May 1904.

== Family ==
He is thought to be the uncle or cousin of Robert Milne, architect, who died in Fettercairn in 1891.

== Main works ==
- Clatto Estate: Clatto House and Steading (between Pitscottie and Strathkinness) (1845)
- Remodelling of St Andrews Free Church, St Andrews (1851)
- Refronting of St Leonard's College (University of St Andrews) (1853)
- Free Church, Arbirlot (1854)
- Upgrading of interior, Carnbee Church (1854)
- Free Church Manse, Rathelpie, near St Andrews (1856)
- St Bernards Free Church, Henderson Row, Edinburgh (1856, demolished c.1990)
- Kinburn House, St Andrews (1856)
- Restoration of Leuchars Parish Church (1856)
- Dunino School (1856)
- Free Church and manse, Carnbee (1857)
- Feuing of Rathelpie estate, St Andrews (1857)
- Logie Parish School (1858)
- 2-4 Queens Terrace, St Andrews (1859)
- Rockview, St Andrews (1860)
- Dura House, Kemback (1861)
- Lathockar House, south of St Andrews (1861)
- Rathelpie Villa, St Andrews (1861)
- Commemorative Arch (for Queen Victoria’s visit), Fettercairn (1863)
- Madras School complex, Newburgh (1863)
- Revised roof form on Ceres Parish Church (1865)
- Remodelling of Pittormie House, Dairsie (1866)
- Dairsie Parish School (1868)
- Duncan Institute, Cupar (1869)
- Mayfield House, St Andrews (1870)
- Westlands House, St Andrews (1870)
- Baxter Institute for Female Education, Cupar (1871)
- Conservative Club, St Andrews (1873)
- East School, Kirkcaldy (1874)
- Tayport School (1875)
- Freuchie Parish Manse (1882)
- 25-29 Marketgate, Crail (1886)
- Melville Terrace, Montrose (1887)
- Fettercairn Public Hall (1891)
- Cottages at Longrow, Fife (1892)
- Extension to the Royal Hotel, St Andrews (1894)

From 1894 until death Milne involved himself with numerous small commissions for individual houses in St Andrews.
