= Glenalmond College =

Private school in Methven, Perth and Kinross, Scotland

Coordinates: 56.4419°N 3.6600°W

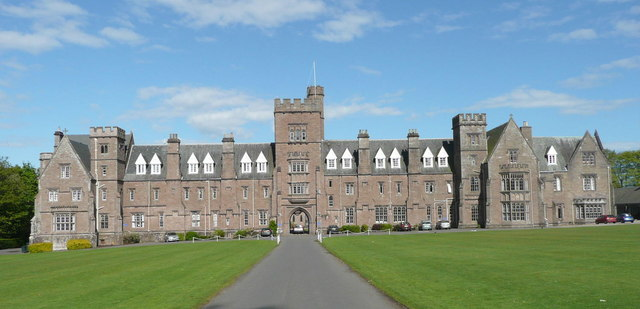

Location
- Glenalmond; Perth, Perth and Kinross, PH1 3RY; Scotland

Information
- Type: Public school Private school Day and boarding
- Motto: Floreat Glenalmond (Let Glenalmond Flourish)
- Religious affiliation: Scottish Episcopal Church
- Established: 1847; 179 years ago
- Founder: William Ewart Gladstone; James Hope-Scott
- Warden: Jenny Davey
- Staff: 52.3 (on an FTE basis)
- Gender: Co-educational
- Age: 12 to 18
- Enrolment: 300+
- Campus size: 300 acres (120 ha)
- Campus type: Rural
- Houses: Cairnies; Goodacre's; Home; Lothian; Matheson's; Patchell's; Reid's; Skrine's
- Colours: Navy Blue; White
- Alumni: Old Glenalmonds
- Website: www.glenalmondcollege.co.uk

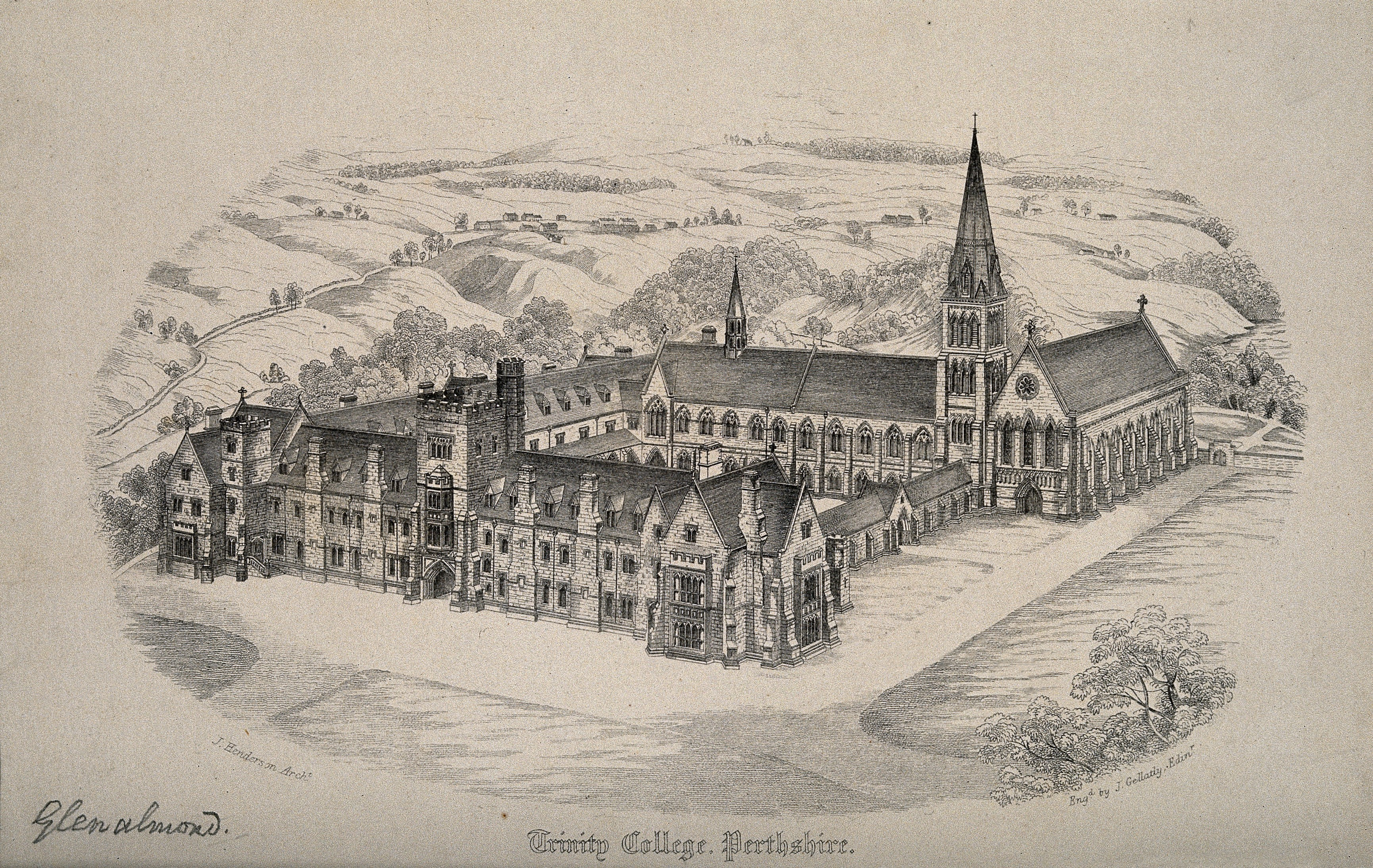
Glenalmond College, architect's original proposed design c. 1841

Glenalmond College is a co-educational private school with boarding facilities in Perth and Kinross, Scotland, for pupils aged between 12 and 18 years. It is situated on the River Almond near the village of Methven, about 8 miles (13 km) west of the city of Perth. The college opened in 1847 as Trinity College, Glenalmond and was renamed in 1983. Originally a boys' school, Glenalmond became co-educational in the 1990s.

== History ==
Trinity College, Glenalmond, was founded as a private school by the former Prime Minister, William Gladstone and James Hope-Scott. The land for the school was given by Lord Glenalmond, who for the rest of his life, in company with his wife Margaret, took a keen interest in its development and success. It was established to provide teaching for young men destined for the ministry of the Scottish Episcopal Church and where young men could be brought up in the faith of that Church. It was originally known as The Scottish Episcopal College of the Holy and Undivided Trinity of Glenalmond. The school opened its doors on 4 May 1847 to fourteen boys (though one boy, Lord Kerr, later Marquess of Lothian and Secretary for Scotland, arrived a day early). The first Warden (headmaster) was Charles Wordsworth.

The Edinburgh architect John Henderson worked on the project in 1841–51; later the firm were re-employed with his son George Henderson in charge on rebuilding work after a fire in 1893. In 1955 Basil Spence was engaged to alter the chapel.

In 1983, the school's name was changed to Glenalmond College. Until 1990 Glenalmond was an all-boys school. Girls were initially admitted into the sixth form only, and the school became fully co-educational in 1995.

In 2007, the school received media attention after pupils reportedly created a spoof video that featured them "hunting" "chavs" (a derogatory term for lower class teenagers in use in the UK) on horseback and with rifles. The school condemned the video.

The school was the subject of a documentary broadcast on BBC 2 in Autumn 2008. Pride and Privilege chronicled a year in the life of Glenalmond and followed a number of pupils and teachers.

There are seven boarding houses split by sex: Goodacre's, Home, and Lothian are for female students, while Matheson's, Patchell's, Reid's and Skrine's are for male students.

In 2024 Glenalmond merged with Craigclowan School & Nursery, forming the Glenalmond Schools Group.

In June 2025, the Glenalmond Schools Group was acquired by 35 Education, a London-based company backed by Qatari investor Khalid bin Mohammed al-Attiyah and academic Prof. Basak Akdemir. The purchase aims to secure the school's financial future and expand its global presence. While some raised concerns over Qatar’s human rights record, school leaders emphasised that the deal had strong internal support and would preserve Glenalmond’s ethos and traditions.

In 2026, the group announced plans to open Glenalmond International School Phuket in Phuket, Thailand, in August 2026.

== Notable alumni ==
- Robbie Coltrane – actor
- Andrew Dunlop, Baron Dunlop – Conservative peer
- Johnie Everett – cricketer
- Christopher Geidt – Queen's private secretary
- Georg Friedrich, Prince of Prussia, current head of the House of Hohenzollern
- Andrew Gordon – historian
- Ronald Gordon – cricketer and soldier
- Dougie Hall – rugby player
- Alister Jack - Conservative Peer and Former Secretary of State for Scotland
- David Leslie – rugby player
- Alastair Mackenzie — actor
- Brian Moser - documentary filmmaker
- Richard Simpson – former Labour Member of the Scottish Parliament and former Justice Minister
- Brian Stewart — diplomat and spy
- Andrew Macdonald — film producer
- Kevin Macdonald — film director
- Rob Wainwright — rugby player
- David Wilson, Baron Wilson - diplomat
