= George Henderson (architect) =

British architect (1846–1905)

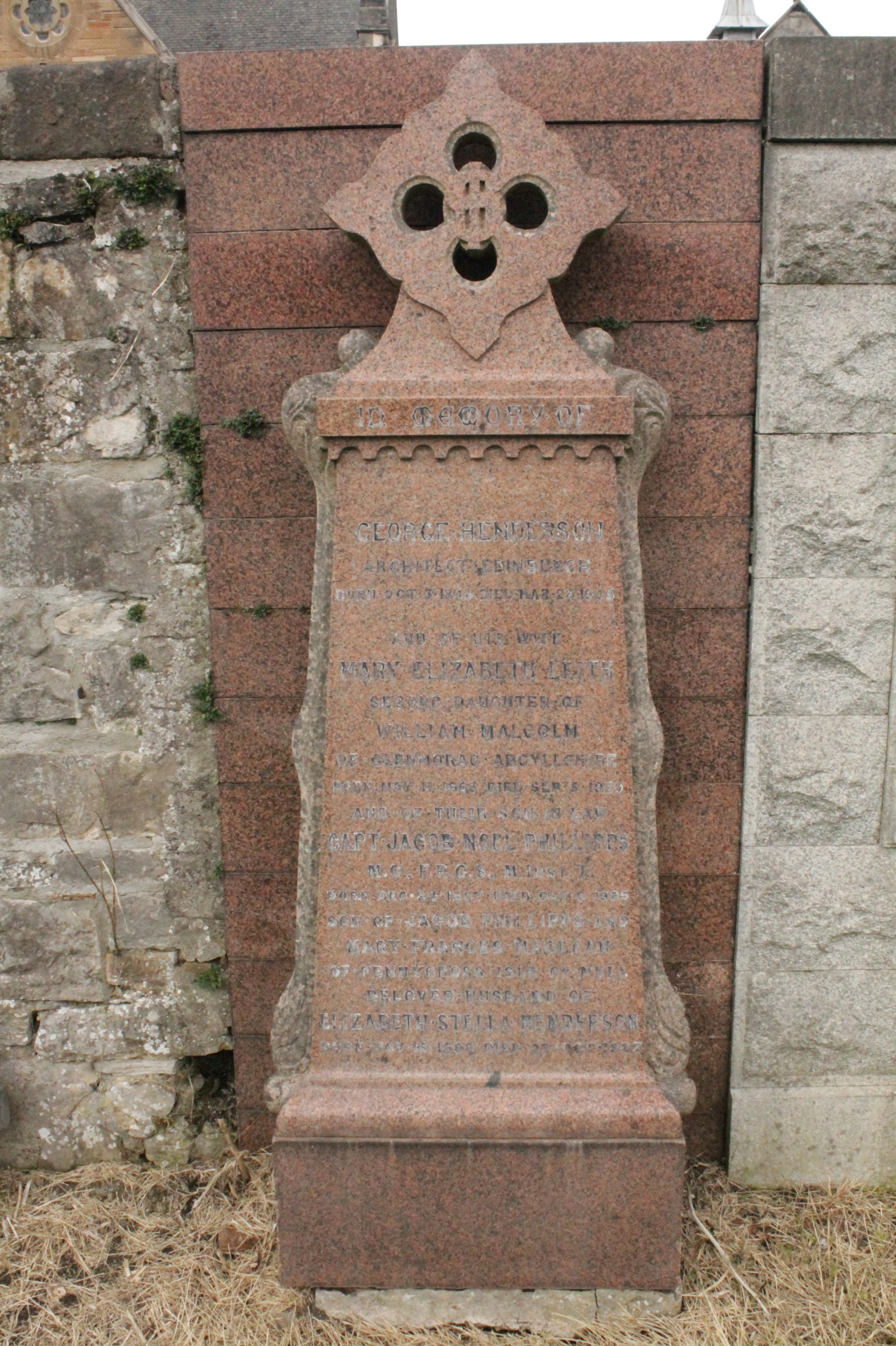
The grave of George Henderson, Grange Cemetery, Edinburgh

George Henderson (3 October 1846 – 24 March 1905) was a British architect.

== Life and career ==
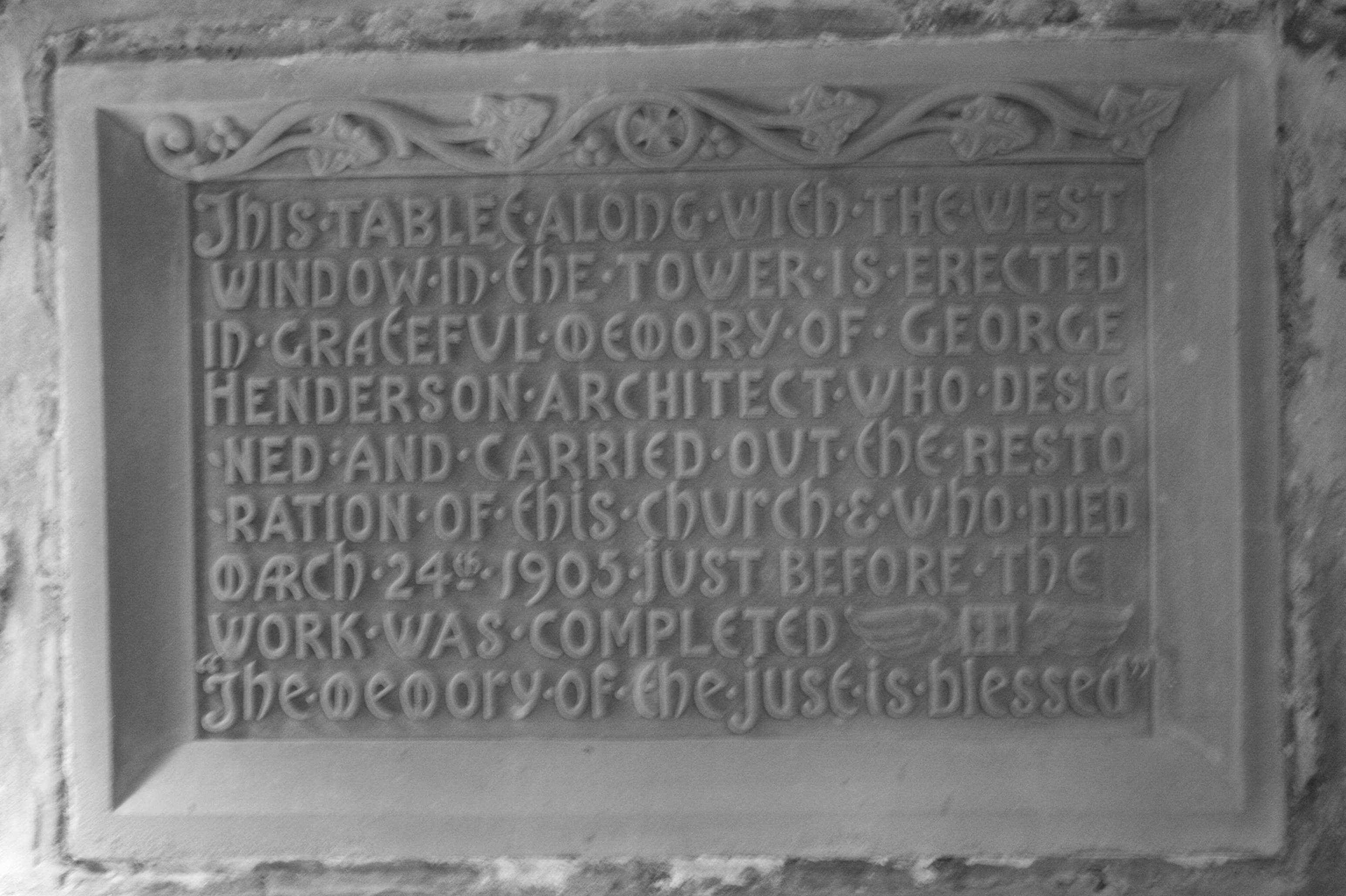
Memorial plaque to architect George Henderson, Corstorphine Parish Church, Edinburgh

Born at 8 Duke Street in Edinburgh (later renamed Dublin Street), Henderson was the son of architect John Henderson and Hannah Matilda Exley. From 1858–1861, he attended the Royal High School, Edinburgh. He then studied architecture under his father, but his studies were cut short when his father died in June 1862. His education was completed under architect David Cousin who inherited his father's architecture firm.

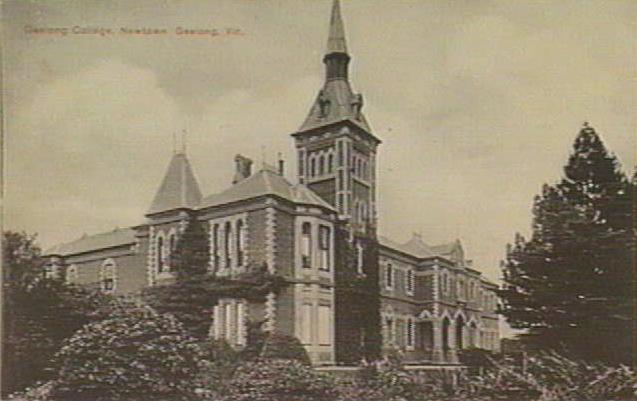
1906 photograph of Geelong College

In May 1867, Henderson emigrated to Australia to join Alexander Davidson's firm in Rokewood, Victoria. The two men had previously worked together as assistants to his father. Henderson lived with Davidson and his wife, and he initially worked for Davidson as an unpaid associate. Several large commissions in late 1868 helped catapult the venture into financial success which enabled Davidson to send money home to his family in Scotland. One of those projects was Barwon Park in Winchelsea, Victoria, which is now a National Trust of Australia.

In early 1869, the two men relocated the firm to Geelong; and, in late 1869, a formal partnership between Davidson and Henderson was established with Henderson, as junior partner, receiving a third of the profits. In 1870, the two men notably designed and built the oldest buildings for The Geelong College. The next few years brought several financial hardships to the firm resulting from a series of unfortunate incidents, including disputes with contractors and a depression in the wool industry which effected the economy of Geelong. As a result, Davidson and Henderson ended their partnership in December 1873. However, a new partnership was established between the two in July 1874 with Henderson receiving 4/9 of the profits.

In April 1876, Henderson and Davidson once again dissolved their partnership; this time permanently and on somewhat hostile terms. Henderson had been working largely as the firm's office manager and had overseen the costing of the jobs; work which left him little time for design which was his true passion. Unsatisfied with his position, he accepted an offer to become a partner to architect William Hay, who had also trained under his father and had recently returned to Edinburgh after a highly successful career for many years as an architect in Toronto. He left Australia for Scotland a few months after dissolving his relationship with Davidson and in early 1877 formed an official partnership with Hay.

Henderson and Hay's practice in Edinburgh mainly consisted of building churches, both in Scotland and abroad. The two men notably designed the Cathedral of the Most Holy Trinity, Bermuda which was constructed in 1885. While Hay designed the majority of the structure; Henderson designed the eastern portion of the cathedral. He also assisted Hay in the restoration of St. Giles' Cathedral in Edinburgh from 1878–1884. The two men worked together until Hay became seriously ill in October 1887. Hay died eight months later and Henderson took over the practice which he led until his own death seven and a half years later.

He died in 1905 at 25 Hermitage Gardens in Edinburgh at the age of 58. He is buried in Grange Cemetery. The grave lies on the south side of the wall separating the south-west and north-west sections.

== Family ==
In 1897, Henderson married Mary Elizabeth Leith Malcolm. The couple had two daughters together: Elizabeth Stella and Amy Louise Huntly.

== Works ==
Building	Year Completed	Builder	Style	Source	Location	Image
St. Giles' Cathedral	1872-1884	William Hay (architect) and George Henderson (architect)	Gothic architecture		Edinburgh, Scotland	St Giles' Cathedral
Bermuda Cathedral, Hamilton	1885	William Hay (architect) and George Henderson (architect)	Gothic architecture		Hamilton, Bermuda	Bermuda Cathedral, Hamilton
