= List of listed buildings in Fettercairn =

This is a list of listed buildings in the parish of Fettercairn in Aberdeenshire, Scotland.

== List ==
| Name | Location | Date Listed | Grid Ref. (Note: Sometimes known as OSGB36, the grid reference (where provided) is based on the British national grid reference system used by the Ordnance Survey. • "Guide to National Grid". Ordnance Survey. • "Get-a-map". Ordnance Survey.) | Geo-coordinates | Notes | LB Number (Note: Historic Environment Scotland assign a unique alphanumeric identifier to each designated site in Scotland, for listed buildings this always begins with "LB", for example "LB12345".) | Image |
|---|---|---|---|---|---|---|---|
| Fettercairn Village Two Houses (Norie), The Cross, North West Side Of Square | | | | 56°51′07″N 2°34′30″W | Category B | 9476 | Upload Photo |
| Fettercairn Village Kirkhill Farm Houses And Steading Buildings The Cross, South-East Side Of Square | | | | 56°51′06″N 2°34′29″W | Category C(S) | 9479 | Upload Photo |
| Fettercairn Village Fettercairn Church Hall | | | | 56°51′05″N 2°34′28″W | Category C(S) | 9480 | Upload Photo |
| Fettercairn Village, Sir John S Forbes Fountain | | | | 56°51′06″N 2°34′31″W | Category B | 9485 | Upload Photo |
| Fettercairn Village, House (Robertson), Ramsay Square | | | | 56°51′04″N 2°34′36″W | Category B | 9490 | Upload Photo |
| Fettercairn Village, Laurel Villa, Burnside | | | | 56°51′01″N 2°34′25″W | Category C(S) | 9492 | Upload Photo |
| The Burn, Gatelodges, Gatepiers, Gardener's House, Public Shelter And Screen Wall With Moulded Footgate Linking To Gannochy Bridge | | | | 56°49′41″N 2°39′22″W | Category B | 9501 | Upload Photo |
| Fasque, St Andrew's Episcopal Chapel | | | | 56°52′12″N 2°34′32″W | Category B | 9505 | Upload Photo |
| Fettercairn Village, Gordon Villa | | | | 56°51′01″N 2°34′22″W | Category C(S) | 9468 | Upload Photo |
| Fasque, Nos 1, 3, 4, 5 And 6 Old Mains Cottages | | | | 56°52′04″N 2°34′09″W | Category C(S) | 51385 | Upload Photo |
| Fettercairn Village Fettercairn Bakery | | | | 56°51′05″N 2°34′30″W | Category C(S) | 9482 | Upload Photo |
| Fettercairn Village, Bridge Over Burn Of Cauldcots At Royal Arch | | | | 56°51′04″N 2°34′32″W | Category C(S) | 9487 | Upload Photo |
| Mains Of Balbegno Farmhouse, Screen Wall And Outbuildings At South-West | | | | 56°50′51″N 2°35′20″W | Category B | 9498 | Upload Photo |
| Fettercairn House Garden Wall | | | | 56°51′21″N 2°33′54″W | Category B | 9508 | Upload Photo |
| Fettercairn Village Parish Church And Churchyard Of Fettercairn | | | | 56°51′06″N 2°34′25″W | Category B | 9509 | Upload Photo |
| Gannochy Bridge | | | | 56°49′40″N 2°39′24″W | Category B | 9471 | Upload another image |
| Loups Suspension Bridge Over River North Esk | | | | 56°50′06″N 2°39′58″W | Category B | 9473 | Upload Photo |
| Fasque, Apple House And Walled Garden With Garden House | | | | 56°51′57″N 2°34′42″W | Category B | 51382 | Upload Photo |
| Fettercairn Village "The Corner" (Mrs Jolly, Mrs Murray) The Cross, South West Corner Of Square | | | | 56°51′07″N 2°34′30″W | Category B | 9475 | Upload Photo |
| Balbegno Castle Garden And Terrace Walls And Gatepiers | | | | 56°50′48″N 2°35′34″W | Category A | 9495 | Upload Photo |
| Balbegno Castle Stable Block And Coachhouses | | | | 56°50′48″N 2°35′40″W | Category B | 9496 | Upload Photo |
| The Burn, Mansionhouse And Stable Block | | | | 56°50′05″N 2°39′37″W | Category B | 9500 | Upload Photo |
| Fasque, Parsonage Of Fasque Including Gate | | | | 56°51′46″N 2°34′15″W | Category C(S) | 9506 | Upload Photo |
| Fettercairn Village, Inchdowrie House And Gatepiers | | | | 56°50′50″N 2°34′09″W | Category C(S) | 9470 | Upload Photo |
| Balbegno Castle | | | | 56°50′49″N 2°35′34″W | Category A | 6754 | Upload Photo |
| Fasque, Home Farm Bothy | | | | 56°52′23″N 2°34′48″W | Category C(S) | 51387 | Upload Photo |
| Fasque, The Octagon | | | | 56°51′59″N 2°35′08″W | Category C(S) | 51388 | Upload Photo |
| Capo Farmhouse | | | | 56°47′16″N 2°36′40″W | Category B | 9502 | Upload Photo |
| Fasque House, Stable Block | | | | 56°52′19″N 2°34′52″W | Category B | 9504 | Upload Photo |
| Torwood House, Outbuildings | | | | 56°50′02″N 2°38′15″W | Category C(S) | 13229 | Upload Photo |
| Fettercairn Village And House And Shop (Rw Kerr) And House (Mrs Scott) The Cross, North-East Side Of Square | | | | 56°51′08″N 2°34′27″W | Category B | 9478 | Upload Photo |
| Fettercairn Village, Ramsay Arms Hotel | | | | 56°51′03″N 2°34′34″W | Category B | 9488 | Upload Photo |
| Fettercairn Village, Arch Cottage And Former Store | | | | 56°51′04″N 2°34′34″W | Category C(S) | 9489 | Upload Photo |
| Arnhall House Garden And Retaining Walls | | | | 56°48′40″N 2°38′05″W | Category C(S) | 9494 | Upload Photo |
| Fasque, South Lodge, Gatepiers, Gates And Quadrant Walls | | | | 56°51′32″N 2°34′24″W | Category B | 51383 | Upload Photo |
| Fasque, Bogendollo | | | | 56°52′31″N 2°34′13″W | Category C(S) | 51386 | Upload Photo |
| Fettercairn Village, Royal Arch | | | | 56°51′04″N 2°34′33″W | Category B | 9483 | Upload Photo |
| Fettercairn Village, Bridgend Cottage | | | | 56°51′11″N 2°34′25″W | Category C(S) | 9469 | Upload Photo |
| Fettercairn, Market Cross Of Fettercairn | | | | 56°51′07″N 2°34′29″W | Category A | 6755 | Upload Photo |
| Fettercairn Village Cottage (Daul) North-West Side Of Square Adjoining Above | | | | 56°51′08″N 2°34′29″W | Category C(S) | 9477 | Upload Photo |
| Fettercairn Village, Burnside Villa, Burnside | | | | 56°51′02″N 2°34′27″W | Category C(S) | 9491 | Upload Photo |
| Arnhall House | | | | 56°48′42″N 2°38′06″W | Category B | 9493 | Upload Photo |
| Balbegno Castle, Dovecot | | | | 56°50′49″N 2°35′29″W | Category A | 9497 | Upload Photo |
| Mains Of Balbegno Farmsteading | | | | 56°50′53″N 2°35′22″W | Category C(S) | 9499 | Upload Photo |
| Fasque, Mains Of Fasque House Including Ancillary Buildings And Gates | | | | 56°51′47″N 2°34′14″W | Category C(S) | 51384 | Upload Photo |
| Torwood House | | | | 56°50′01″N 2°38′16″W | Category B | 13228 | Upload Photo |
| Tillyfoghills Farmhouse | | | | 56°50′12″N 2°36′58″W | Category B | 9474 | Upload Photo |
| Fettercairn Village Post Office And House (J G Robertson) Fettercairn | | | | 56°51′05″N 2°34′29″W | Category C(S) | 9481 | Upload Photo |
| Fettercairn Village, Glengowan | | | | 56°51′05″N 2°34′32″W | Category C(S) | 9484 | Upload Photo |
| Fettercairn Village, Public Hall | | | | 56°51′06″N 2°34′32″W | Category C(S) | 9486 | Upload Photo |
| Fasque House Including Court Of Offices And Sundial | | | | 56°52′11″N 2°34′43″W | Category A | 9503 | Upload Photo |
| Fettercairn House | | | | 56°51′22″N 2°33′58″W | Category B | 9507 | Upload Photo |
| Gannochy Tower | | | | 56°49′31″N 2°39′11″W | Category C(S) | 9472 | Upload Photo |

== Key ==
The scheme for classifying buildings in Scotland is:

- Category A: "buildings of national or international importance, either architectural or historic; or fine, little-altered examples of some particular period, style or building type."
- Category B: "buildings of regional or more than local importance; or major examples of some particular period, style or building type, which may have been altered."
- Category C: "buildings of local importance; lesser examples of any period, style, or building type, as originally constructed or moderately altered; and simple traditional buildings which group well with other listed buildings."

In March 2016 there were 47,288 listed buildings in Scotland. Of these, 8% were Category A, and 50% were Category B, with the remaining 42% being Category C.

== See also ==
- List of listed buildings in Aberdeenshire
