= William Hay (architect) =

Scottish architect (1818–1888)

- Born: 17 May 1818; Dykeside, Peterhead, Scotland
- Died: 30 May 1888 (aged 70); Rabbit Hall, Hamilton Street, Joppa, Edinburgh
- Occupation: Architect
- Buildings: Bermuda Cathedral

William Hay (17 May 1818 – 30 May 1888) was a Scottish architect who was actively working internationally from 1842 to 1887. A specialist in gothic architecture, he is primarily known for his work on several churches and cathedrals. His most famous structure is the Bermuda Cathedral in Hamilton, Bermuda, which he designed in 1885. Construction of the cathedral began in 1886 and was completed seven years after Hay's death in 1905. He also designed some of the oldest buildings and structures in Toronto, Ontario, from 1853 to 1861, and was responsible for the restoration of St. Giles' Cathedral in Edinburgh from 1872 to 1884. His career exemplifies how the British Empire of the Victorian era was united not only by military and political strength but also by professionals who took advantage of opportunities in its wide array of territories.

== Early life: 1818–1841 ==
Born at Dykeside, Peterhead, Hay was named after his father, who was a Scottish Episcopalian grain merchant. In his youth he was apprenticed to a joiner, but an accident during a job at Ellishill House, which broke his leg, ended his career in this area. The doctor treating him for his injury encouraged him to study architecture during his recovery and his career accordingly took a turn in that direction.

== Early career: 1842–1861 ==
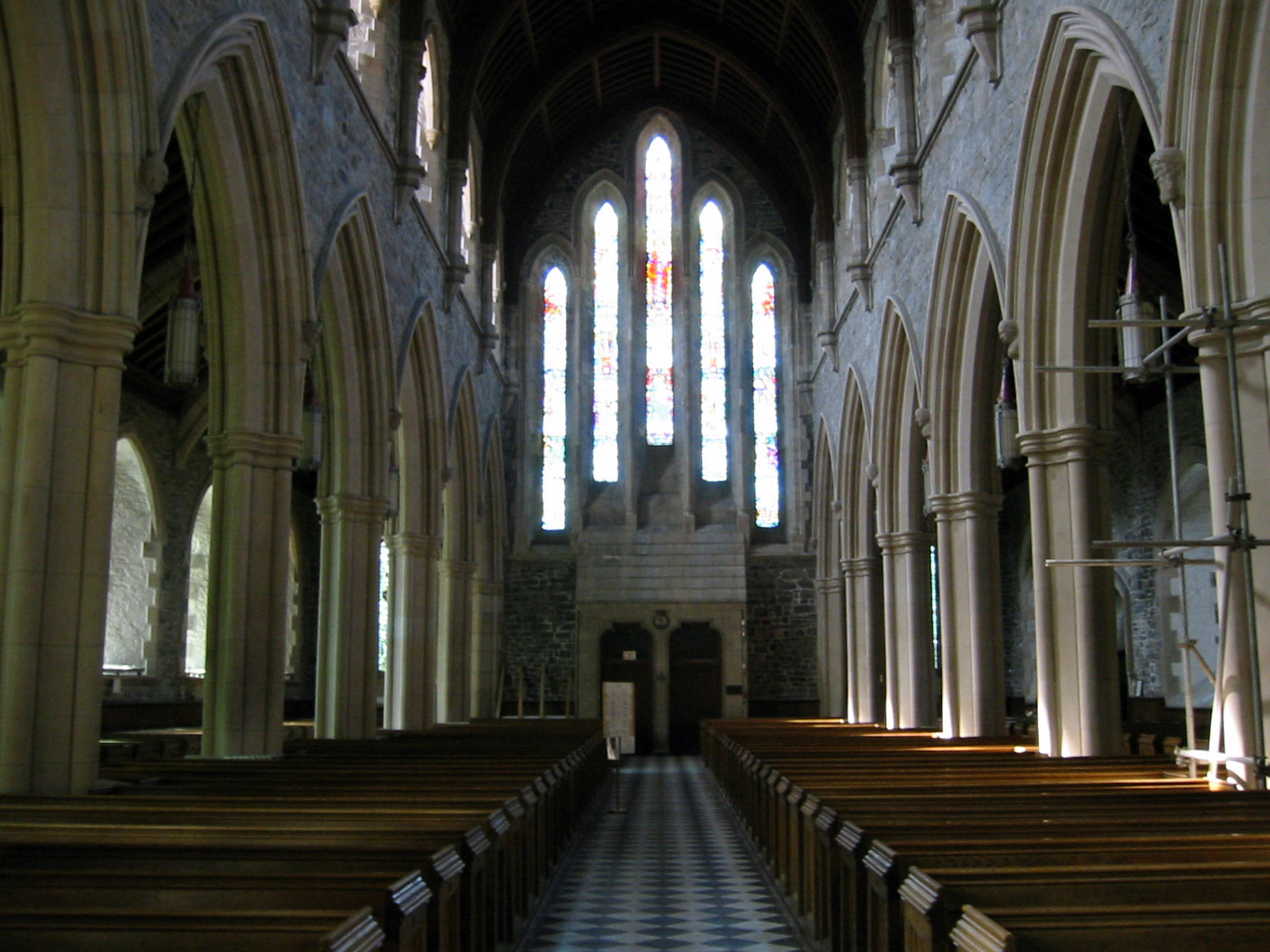
Nave of the Cathedral of St. John the Baptist

Hay tackled his first job as an architect at the age of 24 with the St James Episcopal Church in Cruden Bay in 1842–1843. He married his first wife, Janet Reid (1819–1860), in 1844, and that same year relocated to Edinburgh to become an assistant to architect John Henderson.

After working with Henderson for two years, Hay moved to London to apprentice with George Gilbert Scott in 1846. Scott entrusted him with overseeing the building of the nave of the Cathedral of St. John the Baptist in St. John's, Newfoundland. For that project he travelled throughout England and Scotland in late 1846 and early 1847 to acquire materials and skilled craftsmen. In April 1847 he, along with his wife and her brother Thomas (their ward), sailed to Newfoundland. He remained there until the nave was completed in 1850.

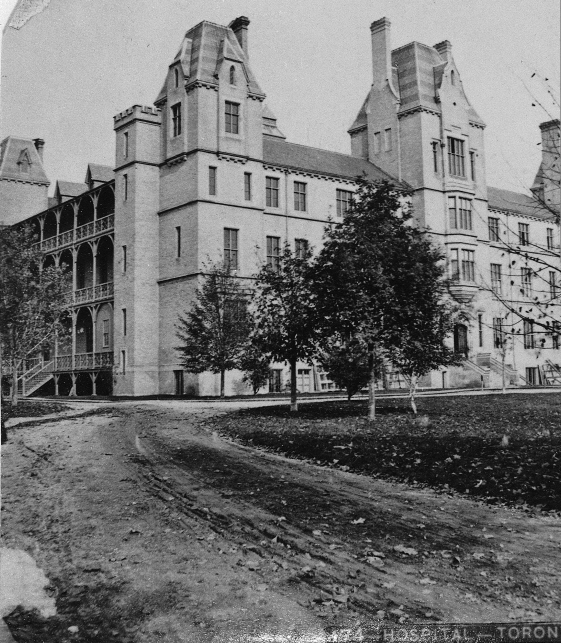
Toronto General Hospital in 1868.

Hay spent some time in his native town working in 1850–1853, building there St. John's Episcopal Church, Longside and a house at No. 22 Broad Street for his mother, Jean Hay (née Alexander). During this time he considered setting up practice in either Montreal, Canada East, or Chicago, Illinois, and made visits to those cities. He ultimately settled on establishing his practice in Toronto, and accordingly moved there in late 1853. He remained in that city until late 1861, following the sudden death of his wife, who never bore children, in 1860.

While in Toronto, Hay developed a highly successful architecture firm which he left to his recently acquired partner, Thomas Gundry. His apprentice Henry Langley became Gundry's new partner upon his departure. In Toronto he designed the Toronto General Hospital (1855), St. Basil's Church, Toronto and St. James Square Presbyterian Church (1855–1856), the House of Providence (1855–1858), two of the original buildings at the University of St. Michael's College (1856), the school addition to the Church of the Holy Trinity (1858), the Yorkville Town Hall (1859–1860), and the Oaklands at De La Salle College (1860) among other structures. He also served on the council of the Royal Canadian Institute (1858–1860), was the vice-president of the Toronto Mechanics' Institute (1859–1861), and was secretary of the Association of Architects Civil Engineers and Provincial Surveyors of Canada.

== Later career: 1862–1888 ==
After some time spent in Scotland in 1861, Hay spent the year 1862 in Bermuda consulting on problems developed during the building of the first Trinity Church, started in 1844 in Hamilton. He had previously been consulted in 1848–1849 for work on the church by Bishop Reid; having reviewed James Cranston of Oxford's 1844 designs for the structure. He had made several alterations to those plans at that time. The church was completed in at least two stages but was destroyed by arson in 1884. Hay, who also designed a replacement church in Bermuda for the town of St George's (begun in 1874 but never completed) was approached to design the replacement Trinity Church in the neo-Gothic style. Built between 1886–1905 and designated a cathedral in 1894, it was his last significant work and his most famous.

In 1862 Hay formed a partnership with architect David Stirling in Halifax, Nova Scotia. They worked together through 1865 on the Halifax Club (1862), Alexander Keith's residence (1863), and a new Provincial Building designed for use as a post office, customs house, and railway department (built from 1863 to 1868, now the Art Gallery of Nova Scotia). He married his second wife, Jemima Huddleston (1838–1905) of Ryde, Isle of Wight, in 1864. The couple produced one daughter, Fanny, and settled in Edinburgh where Hay set up a new practice.

In 1871 he was hired by Sir William Chambers, Lord Provost of Edinburgh, to oversee the restoration of St. Giles' Cathedral which took place from 1872 to 1884. In 1877 he formed a partnership with John Henderson's son George Henderson. The two men worked together until Hay became seriously ill in October 1887. He died eight months later at Rabbit Hall, Hamilton Street, Joppa at the age of 70.

== Selected works ==
Building	Year Completed	Builder	Style	Source	Location	Image
St. Michael's College	1856	William Hay (architect)	Gothic architecture	2	50 Saint Joseph Street Toronto, Ontario	
St. Basil's Church, Toronto	1855–1856	William Hay (architect)	Gothic architecture		St. Joseph Street west of Bay Street, Toronto, Ontario	
Oaklands	1860	John Macdonald, design William Hay	Gothic architecture	8	De La Salle College, Toronto, Ontario	
Holy Trinity Rectory	1861	William Hay (architect)	Gothic architecture	15	10 Trinity Square, Toronto, Ontario	Holy Trinity Rectory
Art Gallery of Nova Scotia	1863–1868	William Hay (architect)	Gothic architecture		Halifax, Nova Scotia	Art Gallery of Nova Scotia
St. Giles' Cathedral	1872–1884	William Hay (architect) and George Henderson (architect)	Gothic architecture		Edinburgh, Scotland	St Giles' Cathedral
Bermuda Cathedral	1885	William Hay (architect) and George Henderson (architect)	Gothic architecture		Hamilton, Bermuda	Bermuda Cathedral, Hamilton
