= Mark James (British cleric) =

British cleric

Canon Mark James
- Born: 19 October 1845
- Died: 16 May 1898 (aged 52); Hamilton, Bermuda
- Spouse: Caroline James
- Children: 6
- Parents: Philip James (father); Susan Georgiana James (mother)

Rev. Mark James (19 October 1845 – 16 May 1898) was a British Anglican cleric who served as Rector of Pembroke and Devonshire, Bermuda, Canon of Bermuda Cathedral and de jure head of the Anglican Church of Bermuda.

== Life ==
James was born the son of Philip and Susan James.

Initially James was appointed to the Parish of Turks and Caicos Islands although in 1873 he was transferred to Pembroke Parish and Devonshire Parish as Rector. During his time as Rector, James oversaw the building and repairs of Trinity Church, the parish church of Pembroke, during this time, Trinity Church was termed a Chapel of ease for the Bishop of Newfoundland and Bermuda. However, in 1884, Trinity Church was destroyed by arson, and the building of the new Cathedral was started in 1885, at which point James was appointed Canon of Bermuda Cathedral. As Canon of Bermuda Cathedral and Vice-Chairman of the Building Committee, he approved the design and oversaw the collection for and construction of the new cathedral and was at the same time de jure Archdeacon of Bermuda. Although only Vice-Chairman, in reality, the Chairman, Llewellyn Jones, the Bishop of Newfoundland and Bermuda was seldom there, so James was de facto head of the committee. James died in office before the completion of the construction of Bermuda Cathedral and there remains a bell put up in memorial for him. His successor as Rector was James Davidson, later Archdeacon of Bermuda.

== Personal life ==
Mark James married Caroline (née Stewart) and they had five children:

- Elsie James, married first Major Harold Frank Senior, secondly Captain Henry Arthur Trevor Brand, son of the Hon. Arthur Brand, MP.
- Dr. Philip William James MC, a Doctor in the Royal Army Medical Corps.
- Herbert Mark James, a Tea trader.
- Harry Eames James, Insurance Manager of the company Harry E. James Insurance, Inc. which merged with AON plc.

He also had another son by Araminta Winder Darrell, the granddaughter of Levin Winder.

- Captain Mark Darrell James, of the Royal Artillery who died playing Polo.

Through his sister Martha, James was brother-in-law of The Ven Andrew Spens of Craigsanquhar, the Archdeacon of Lahore. His aunt was Maria, Countess of Buchan

Mark James died on 16 May 1898 in Hamilton, Bermuda.
