= Cathedral of the Most Holy Trinity, Bermuda =

Coordinates: 32.2944°N 64.7830°W

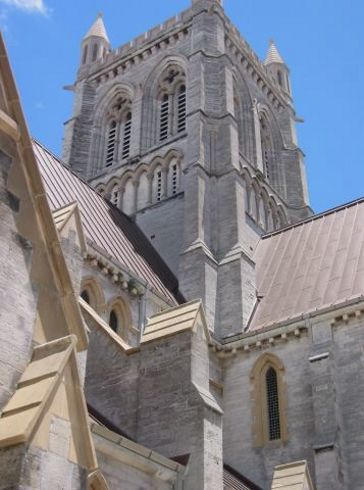
Bermuda Cathedral, Hamilton

The Cathedral of the Most Holy Trinity (often referred to as the Bermuda Cathedral) is an Anglican (the state church, the Church of England; which in Bermuda was renamed the Anglican Church of Bermuda in 1978, an extra-provincial diocese under the Archbishop of Canterbury) cathedral located on Church Street in the City of Hamilton, in Pembroke Parish, in the British Overseas Territory of Bermuda.

The original Trinity Church was designed in the Early English style by James Cranston of Oxford in 1844 and was completed in 1869. Named Trinity Church, it was designated a chapel of ease for the then-Bishop of Newfoundland and Bermuda, whose Cathedral (the Cathedral of St. John the Baptist), was at St. John's, Newfoundland). In Bermuda, St. John's Church was already the parish church for Pembroke Parish, and remained so after Trinity Church was constructed. Trinity Church was destroyed by arson in 1884. Scottish architect William Hay, who had been consulted on the construction of the first building in 1848–1849 and again in 1862, was hired by Canon Mark James to design the current structure in 1885 in the Gothic Revival style. While Hay designed most of the structure, his partner George Henderson designed the eastern portion of the cathedral.

The building committee was chaired by Llewellyn Jones, the Bishop of Newfoundland and Bermuda; the vice-chairman was Canon Mark James, although he died in office and was succeeded by the Hon. William H. Gosling. The bishop was generally elsewhere engaged, so the majority of the work fell upon the vice-chairman.

The cathedral was constructed between 1886 and 1905, originally to serve, like its predecessor, as a chapel of ease for the Bishop of Newfoundland and Bermuda. It became a cathedral when the Bishop of Bermuda was established as separate from the Bishop of Newfoundland in 1919. The structure is primarily Bermuda limestone, with the exception of several decorative features made from carved Caen stone that were brought in from France.

In an unhappy co-incidence, in 1892 the Cathedral of St. John the Baptist in Newfoundland was destroyed, with much of the city of St. John's, in the Great Fire of 1892. It was reconstructed and also completed in 1905.

It is one of two cathedrals in Bermuda, the other being the Roman Catholic St. Theresa's, also in Hamilton. Composer S. Drummond Wolff was organist at the cathedral from 1959 to 1962. For a small fee, visitors to the cathedral can climb the tower for a view of Hamilton and its harbour.

== Gallery ==
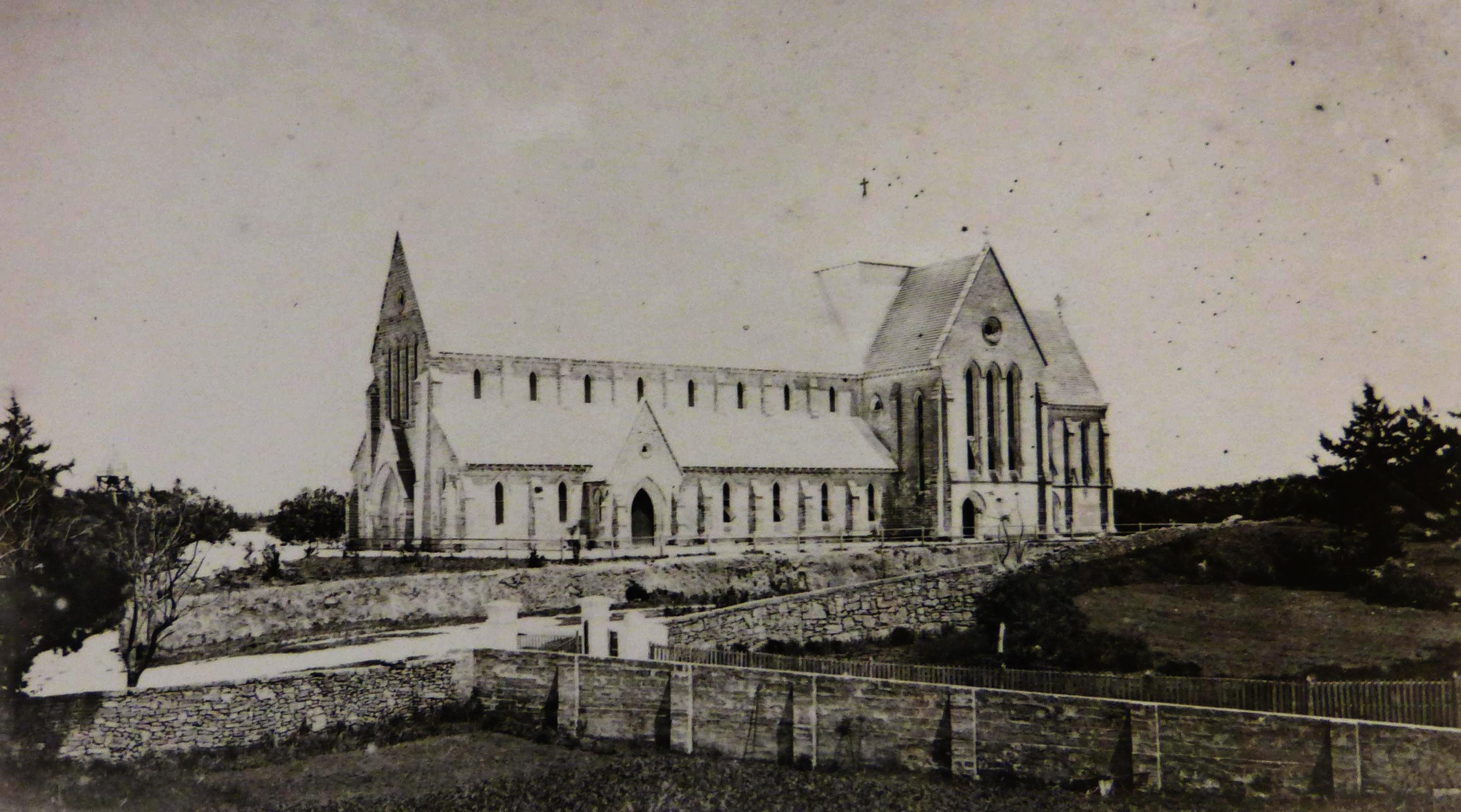
The original Trinity Church chapel-of-ease in 1879

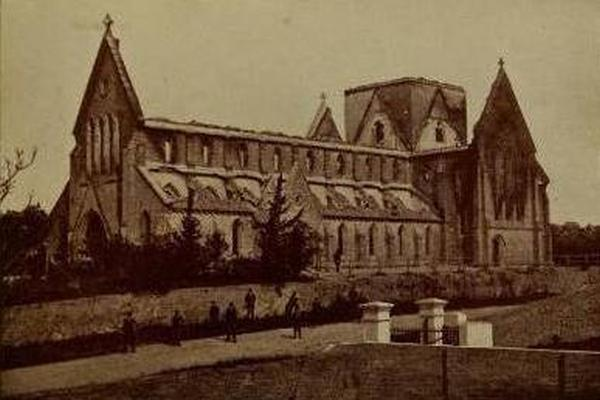
Chapel-of-ease Trinity Church after the fire in 1884

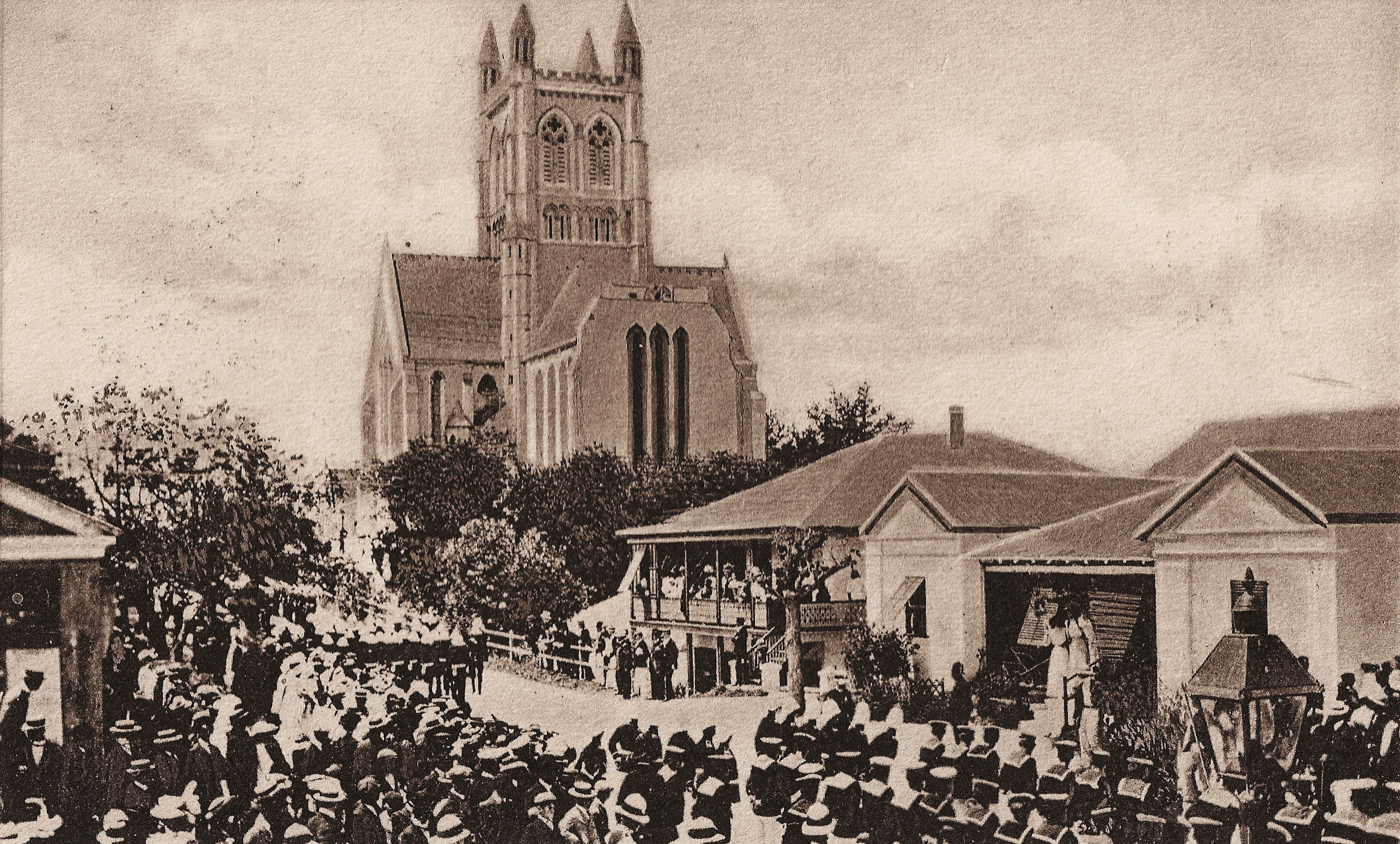
A church parade by the Royal Navy and British Army in front of the incomplete cathedral, circa 1900

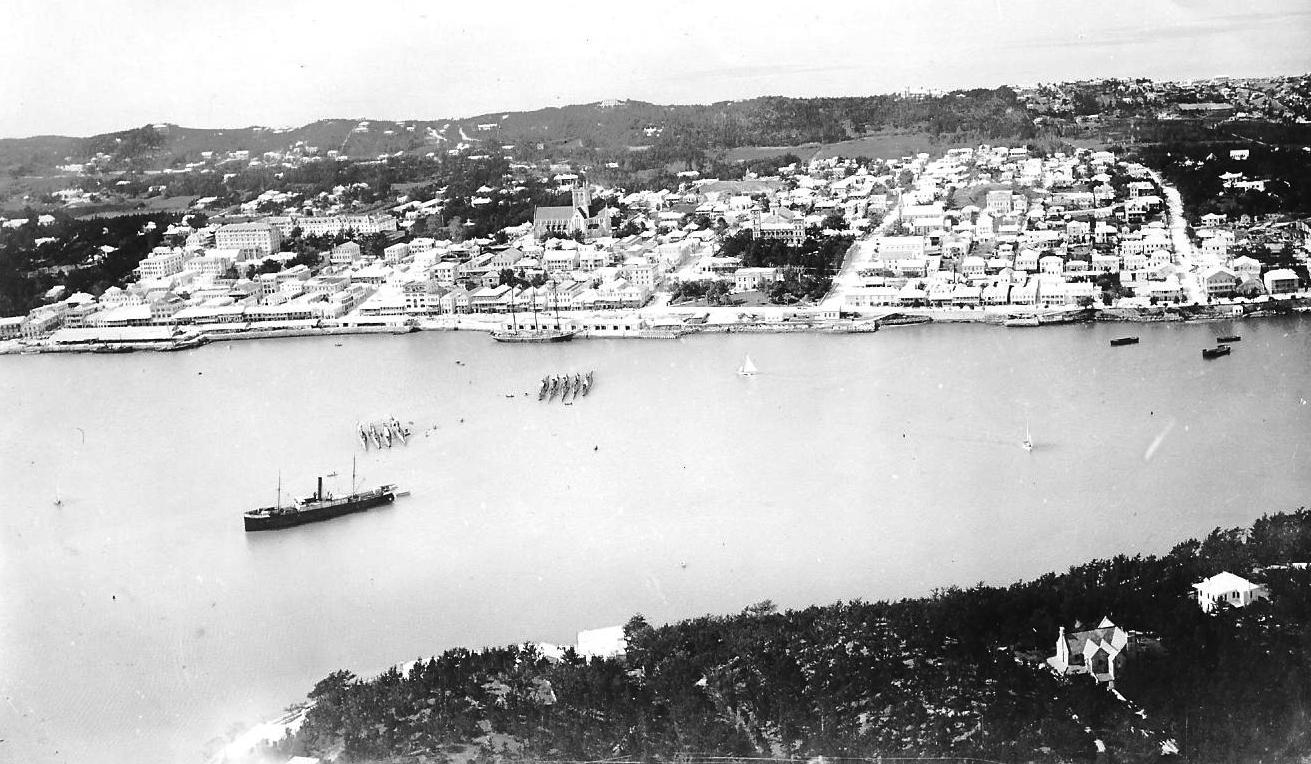
The cathedral sits at the highest point in the city (circa 1926)

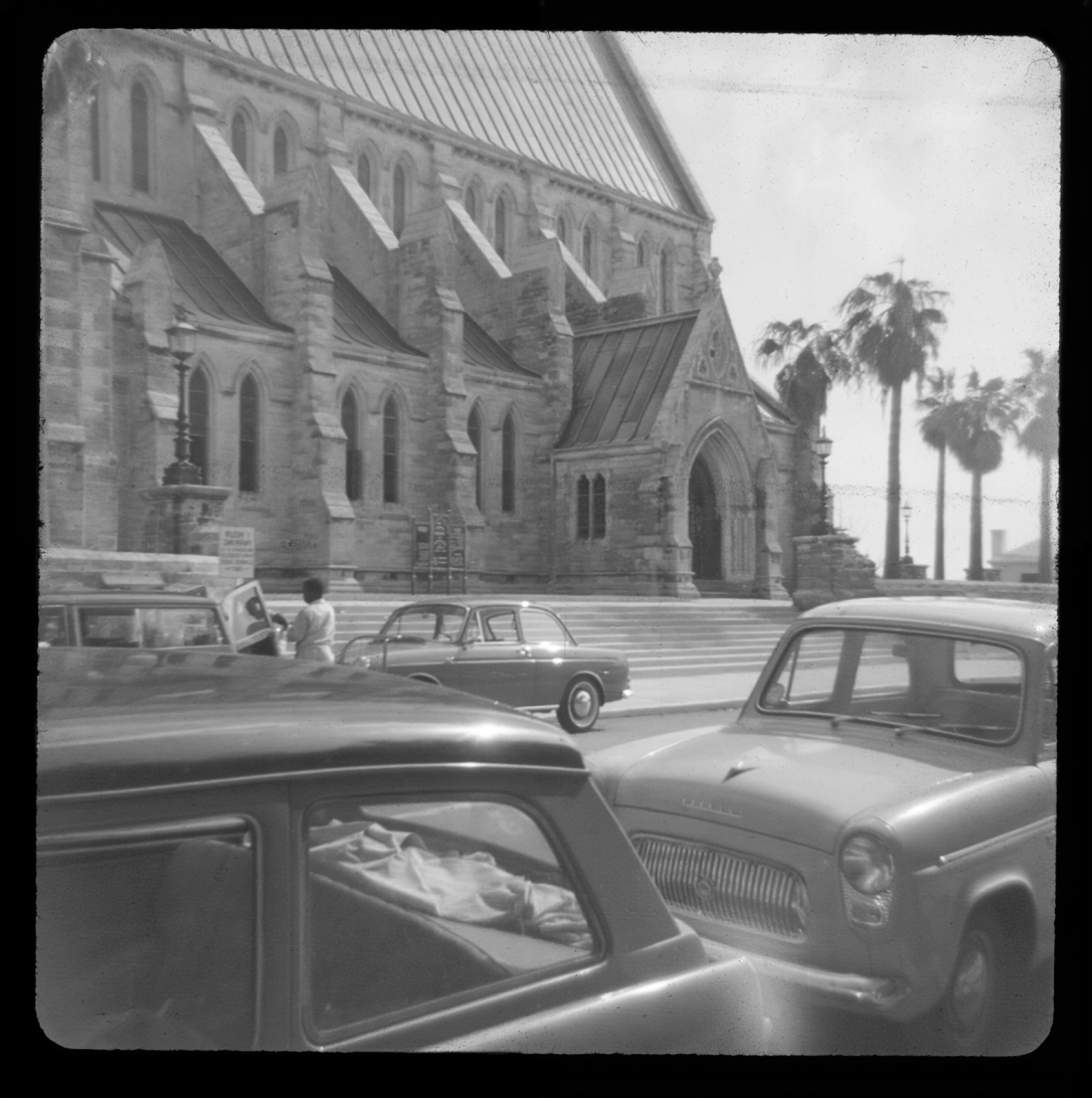
Photo from Circa 1960-1970

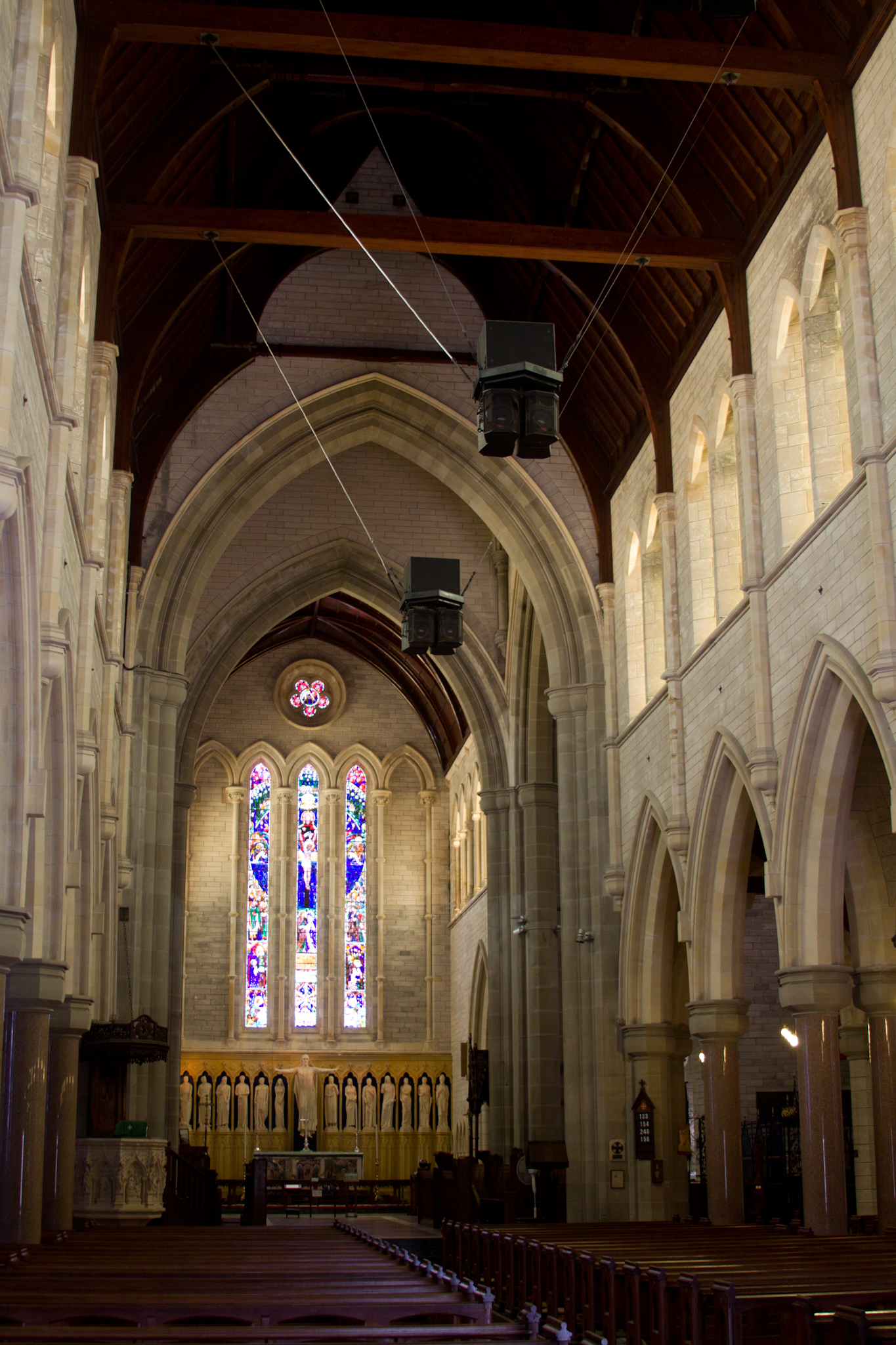
Interior

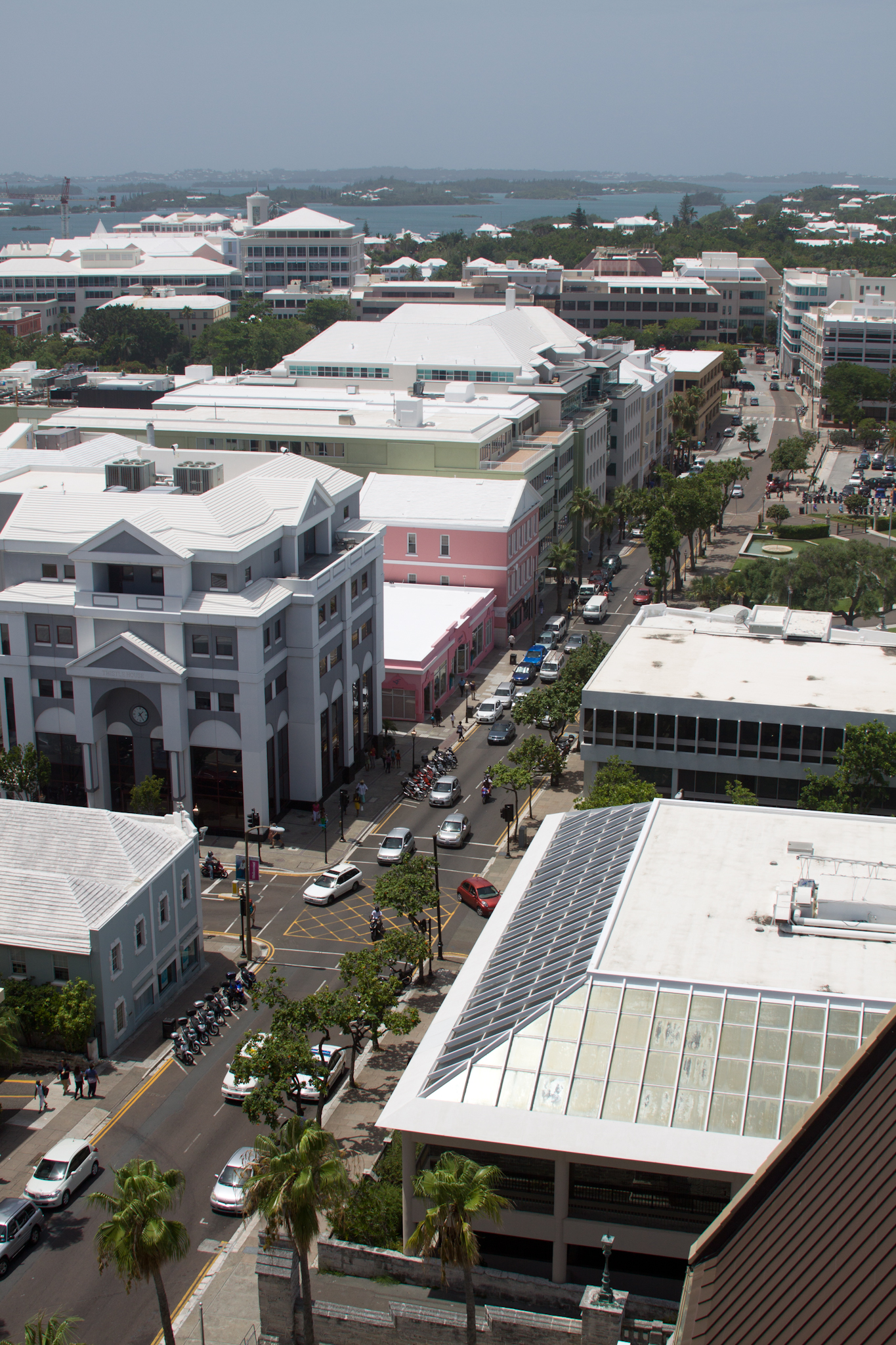
View from tower
