= Fettercairn distillery =

Whisky distillery in Fettercairn, Scotland

Coordinates: 56.8535°N 2.5825°W

Fettercairn
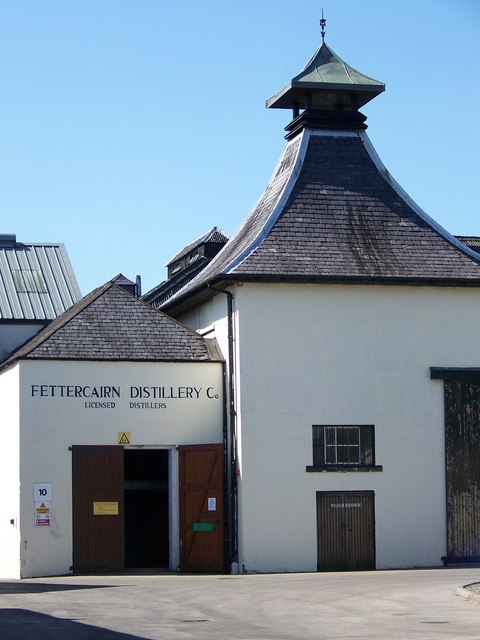
- Distillery entrance

Region: Highland
- Location: Fettercairn
- Owner: Whyte & Mackay
- Founded: 1824
- Founder: Sir Alexander Ramsay
- Status: Open
- Water source: Sources on the Grampian mountains
- No. of stills: 2 wash stills (12,800 L) two spirit stills (12,800 L) and 11 Washbacks
- Capacity: 2,200,000 litres of pure alcohol per year [approx.]
- Mothballed: 1926 to 1939

Fettercairn Fior, Fettercairn Fasque, [24, 30 and 40 years old are no longer available]

Fettercairn distillery is a Highland single malt Scotch whisky distillery in Fettercairn. Situated under the Grampian foothills in the Howe of Mearns, Fettercairn town’s name is loosely based on the phrase "the foot of the mountain".

The distillery is operated by Whyte & Mackay, which Philippines-based Alliance Global owns.

== History ==
Fettercairn Distillery was founded in 1824 by Alexander Ramsay, owner of the Fasque estate, who converted a corn mill at Nethermill into a distillery. After losing his fortune, Alexander was forced to sell the estate to the Gladstone family in 1829. John Gladstone’s son William Gladstone, went on to become Prime Minister and Chancellor of the Exchequer and was instrumental in passing various reforms on the taxation of whisky. In 1887, a fire forced the distillery to close for some time.

Fettercairn was sold by the Gladstone family to Ross & Coulter in 1924. Ross & Coulter sold it Associated Scottish Distilleries in 1939.

In 1973 Whyte & Mackay acquired Fettercairn distillery and it has remained with the company since.

== Emblems ==
The arch and the unicorn are two symbols that are heavily associated with Fettercairn. The unicorn is said to stand for purity and strength and has been a symbol of Scotland since the reign of King Robert III. It is also used within the Ramsay clan crest, of which the founder Alexander Ramsay brought with him to the distillery. The Fettercairn arch dominates the entrance to the town and was built to commemorate a visit by Queen Victoria and Prince Albert in 1861. This symbol has also been used in the design and logo of Fettercairn malts.

== Products ==
Fettercairn whiskey is produced using distinctive stills and forged through temperate maturation. Within its process, the distillery uses a unique irrigator ring that surrounds the stills which drenches the still to deliver only the purest spirit. In recent years, they have been experimenting with flavours from wood charring, with whisky aged in barrels made from locally sourced oaks.

Products available are:

- Fettercairn 12 years old
- Fettercairn 16 Years old
- Fettercairn 22 years old
- Fettercairn 28 years old
- Fettercairn 40 years old
- Fettercairn 50 years old
- Fettercairn Fasque
- Fettercairn Fior
- Limited bottling of Fettercairn cask strength whisky 54°ABV
- The following whiskies are now sold out
- Fettercairn 24 years old
- Fettercairn 30 years old
