= Dura Den =

Gorge in Fife, Scotland

Coordinates: 56.31159°N 2.94382°W

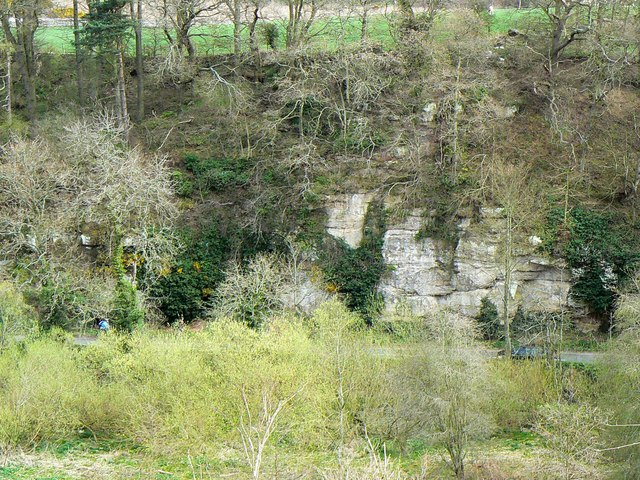
The sandstone cliffs of Dura Den

Dura Den is a small, 3 km-long wooded gorge that is located near Cupar in northeastern Fife, Scotland. This narrow cleft follows a course between the villages of Kemback to the north and Pitscottie to the south. A small stream, named the Ceres (or Kame) Burn, follows the course of this gorge and this flow includes small waterfalls near the midpoint. Historically the Ceres Burn was used to power jute spinning mills

Around 1859, the geologist and Newburgh minister John Anderson discovered what turned out to be extensive sandstone deposits of ganoid fossilized fish in this area.

The Dura Den Wood occupies an area of 4.25 acres (17,200 m^{2}). The woods include ash, oak, and hazel.
