= Pitscottie =

Coordinates: 56°18′N 2°56′W

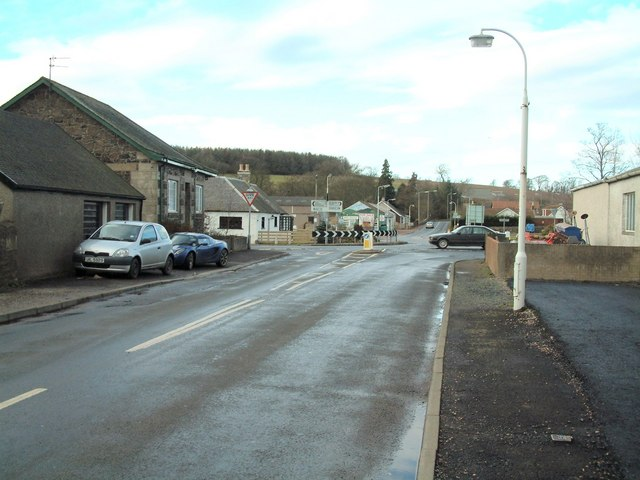
Pitscottie crossroads

Pitscottie is a village in the Parish of Ceres, Fife, situated on the Ceres Burn at a road junction to the south of Dura Den and 3 miles (5 km) southeast of Cupar. The nearby Pitscottie Moor was a favourite meeting place of Covenanters during the late 17th century and during the 1820s the village became a centre of flax spinning. There is an 18th-century bridge over the Ceres Burn.

== Robert Lindsay ==
It was the home of Robert Lindsay of Pitscottie, who wrote the first vernacular prose history of Scotland entitled The Historie and Cronicles of Scotland, 1436 - 1565.

== Frances Groome ==
In 1882–4, Frances Groome's Ordnance Gazetteer of Scotland described Pitscottie like this:

"Pitscottie, a hamlet in Ceres parish, Fife, on the right bank of Ceres Burn, 1½ mile NE of Ceres village and 3 miles ESE of Cupar. It takes its name, signifying the 'little hollow,' from its position between two confronting rising-grounds at the entrance to Dura Den; and two flax spinning-mills were erected at it in 1827. A 'countrie hous covered with strae and ried,' which stood on a small adjoining plateau, now occupied by the modern farmstead of Pitscottie, was the residence of Robert Lindsay, author of the quaint Chronicles of Scotland from 1436 to 1565. Pitscottie Moor, in the immediate neighbourhood, was a frequent meeting-place of the Covenanters for field preachings; and is named in a decree of 1671 against certain ousted ministers."

== Sources ==
- —Ord. Sur., sh. 41, 1857.
