= Alexander Davidson (architect) =

Scottish architect

Alexander Davidson (17 May 1839 – 2 January 1908) was a Scottish architect active in Australia.

Davidson was born in Edinburgh and studied at the Royal Scottish Academy. He was articled to architect John Henderson, but after Henderson died prematurely he was persuaded, in 1864, to emigrate to Australia.

Davidson set up a partnership in Victoria with his Edinburgh friend, George Henderson, though in 1876 Henderson received an offer of work in Edinburgh and the partnership ended. Davidson continued to trade, under the name Alexander Davidson & Co.
