= Fettercairn =

Coordinates: 56.85161°N 2.57548°W

Fettercairn: Scottish Gaelic: Fothair Chàrdain
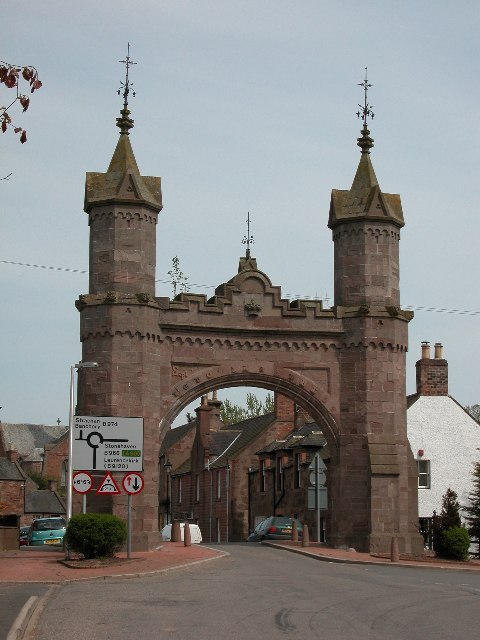
- Royal Arch by John Milne

- Location within Aberdeenshire
- OS grid reference: NO650734
- Council area: Aberdeenshire
- Lieutenancy area: Kincardineshire
- Country: Scotland
- Sovereign state: United Kingdom
- Post town: LAURENCEKIRK
- Postcode district: AB30
- Police: Scotland
- Fire: Scottish
- Ambulance: Scottish
- UK Parliament: West Aberdeenshire and Kincardine
- Scottish Parliament: Angus North and Mearns

Fettercairn (/ˌfɛtərˈkɛərn/, Scottish Gaelic: Fothair Chàrdain) is a small village in Aberdeenshire, Scotland, northwest of Laurencekirk in Aberdeenshire on the B966 from Edzell. Fettercairn is also reached via the Cairn O' Mount road (B974) from Deeside.

The name comes from the Scottish Gaelic Fothair and the Pictish carden and means "slope by a thicket". The name appeared as Fotherkern in c. 970.

In the 2011 national census, Fettercairn had a population of 353.

== Overview ==
The shaft of the old 16th century Kincardine Mercat cross stands in the square, and is notched to show the measurements of a Scottish ell. Nearby the ruins of the long since abandoned county town and royal castle of Kincardine (Gaelic: Cinn Chàrdainn meaning "The head of the copse", including the Pictish word carden, "copse" ) similarly Fettercairn (Gaelic: Fothair Chàrdainn meaning "Shelving or terraced slope at the copse", containing Pictish carden) Kincardine stood about 2 miles (3 km) northeast of Fettercairn, and by the end of the 16th century had declined to a mere hamlet, being represented now only by xv. 26 the ruins of the royal castle and an ancient burial-ground.

A memorial archway erected in 1864 commemorates the 1861 visit by Queen Victoria and Prince Albert, while staying at Balmoral. Leaves from the journal of our life in the highlands describes aspects of their visit. Queen Victoria writes "At a quarter-past seven o'clock we reached the small quiet town, or rather village, of Fettercairn, for it was very small-not a creature stirring, and we got out at the quiet little inn, "Ramsay Arms" quite unobserved". "Louis and General Grey had rooms in an hotel, called "The Temperance Hotel" opposite". "The evening being bright and moonlight and very still, we all went, and walked through the whole village, where not a creature moved:- through the principal little square, in the middle of which was a sort of pillar or Town Cross on steps, and Louis read, by the light of the moon, a proclamation for collections of charities which was stuck on it". "Suddenly we heard a drum and fifes!". "As we walked slowly back, we heard the noise from time to time- and when we reached the inn door, we stopped and saw six men march up with fifes and a drum (not a creature taking any notice of them), go down the street and back again". "Albert asked the little maid, and the answer was, "It's just a band" and that it walked about in this way twice a week. How odd! It went on playing some time after we got home".

Historically Fettercairn lies at the southern end of the Monboddo Estate, where the Scottish philosopher and precursor of evolutionary thought, James Burnett, Lord Monboddo, lived. Fettercairn houses the Fettercairn distillery (owned by Whyte and Mackay Ltd.) that produces the "Fettercairn 1824" single malt whisky.

== History ==
In 995 Lady Finella assassinated Kenneth II at Fettercairn.

In 1504 Fettercairn was granted the status of a free burgh of barony, with the right to hold a weekly market and an annual fair that was dedicated to St Mark. The market and fair brought a period of growth and prosperity to the village which lasted until the village was sacked and burned by the army of the Marquis of Montrose in 1645 during the Wars of the Three Kingdoms. Five years later, in 1650, Montrose would pass through Fettercairn, bound hand and foot on horseback, on his way to his execution in Edinburgh after being betrayed by Neil Macleod of Assynt.

=== 18 to 19th centuries ===
John Barclay founded the Berean protestant sect in Fettercairn in the late 18th century. Barclay was appointed the assistant to the Fettercairn parish minister, Antony Dow, in 1763. Although his charisma made him popular with the congregation, his antinomianist leanings resulted in Barclay being ostracised by the church hierarchy. In 1772, lacking a patron as then required by the church, he was rejected as successor after the death of Dow, and was also refused by the presbytery the testimonials required in order to obtain another living. Following his rejection, Barclay and his followers seceded, to form the first Berean congregation under his ministry. A place of worship was erected at Sauchieburn (approximately 3 miles south of Fettercairn). Barclay remained minister until 1775 before leaving to found additional congregations in Edinburgh and London.

Fettercairn Distillery was founded in 1824 by Alexander Ramsay, owner of the Fasque estate, who converted a corn mill at Nethermill into a distillery. After losing his fortune, Alexander was forced to sell the estate to the Sir John Gladstone in 1829. In 1973, Whyte & Mackay acquired Fettercairn distillery and it has remained with the company since.

== Education ==
Primary education and nurseries services are provided in the village by Fettercairn Primary School. The school's catchment area includes the village and the surrounding rural area, it has approximately 90 pupils. The current school building was built in 1963 and originally had only two classrooms, it was extended in 1974, adding an additional two classrooms and a nursery room.

The majority of students travel to Mearns Academy in Laurencekirk to attend secondary school.

== Gallery ==
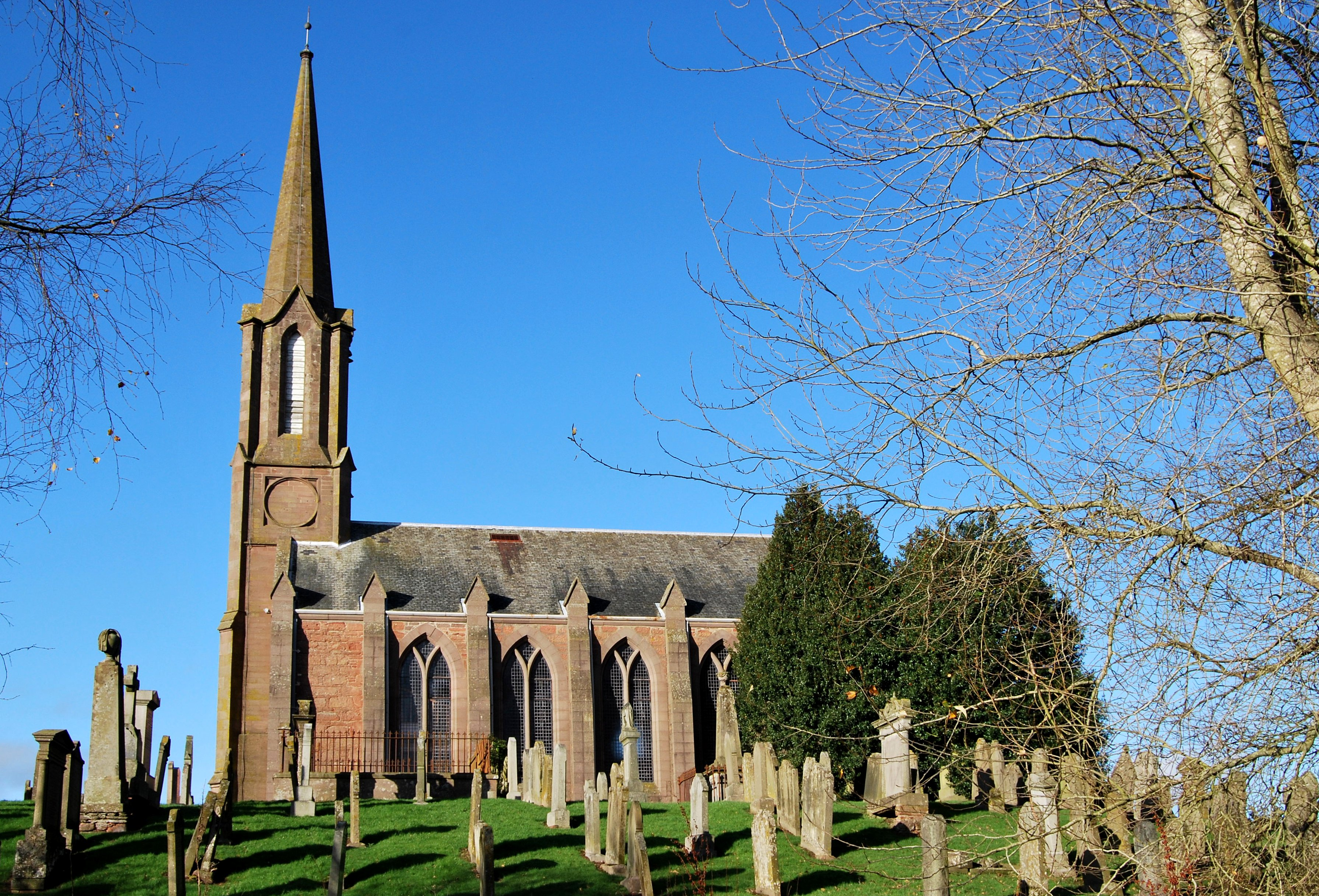
St Martins Church

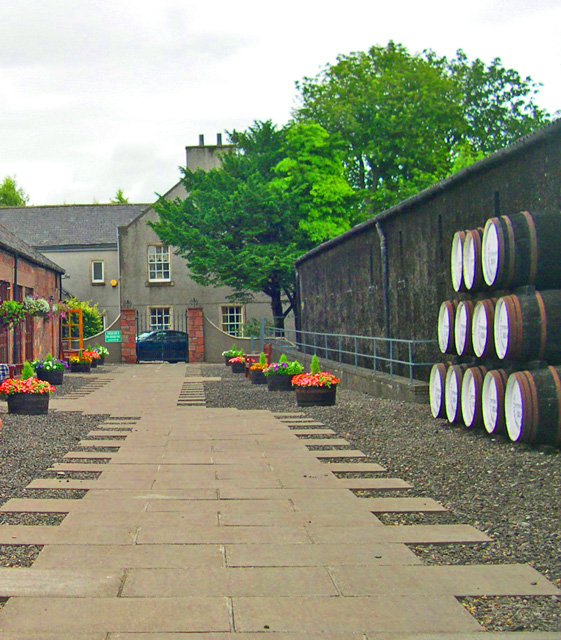
Fettercairn distillery.

== See also ==
- Fasque House
- Fettercairn distillery
- List of listed buildings in Fettercairn, Aberdeenshire
- Monboddo House
