= Ronald Gordon (cricketer) =

Scottish cricketer and British Army officer (1876–1914)

Personal information
- Full name: Ronald Steuart Gordon
- Born: 24 November 1876; Elgin, Morayshire, Scotland
- Died: 31 October 1914 (aged 37); Messines, West Flanders, Belgium
- Batting: Unknown

Domestic team information
- Years: Team
- 1899/00: Europeans

Career statistics
Competition	First-class
Matches	1
Runs scored	8
Batting average	8.00
100s/50s	–/–
Top score	8
Catches/stumpings	1/–
- Source: Cricinfo, 7 October 2020

Ronald Steuart Gordon (24 November 1876 – 31 October 1914) was a Scottish first-class cricketer and British Army officer.

The son of John Lewis Gordon, he was born at Elgin in November 1876 and was educated at Trinity College, Glenalmond. After completing his education, Gordon decided on a career in the British Army and attended the Royal Military College, Sandhurst. He graduated as a second lieutenant in January 1897, prior to his appointment to the Indian Staff Corps, to which he was appointed to the following year. Gordon was attached firstly to the 61st Pioneers, before transferring to the 57th Wilde's Rifles. He was promoted to lieutenant in April 1899. In August of the same year, he made a single appearance in first-class cricket for the Europeans cricket team against the Parsees at Bombay in the Bombay Presidency Match. Batting once in the match, he was dismissed for 8 runs by Kekhashru Mistry in the Europeans first innings. He served in the Boxer Rebellion in China in 1900. Promotion to captain followed in December 1905, with Gordon serving in the North-West Frontier Province in 1908 during the Mohmand Expedition, with Gordon present during the engagements at Matta and Kargha, for which he was mentioned in dispatches.

Gordon married Ruby Mary Moore at Melbourne in August 1914, with the couple departing Australia for British India the day after their wedding. With the start of the First World War in July 1914, the 57th Rifles were transferred to France, where they saw action at the Battle of Messines in October 1914. It was during this battle, on 30 October, that Gordon was killed in action while attempting to cover a German advance to allow the rest of his company to retreat. His body was never recovered from the battlefield and he is memorialised at the Menin Gate Memorial.
