= Christopher Winter =

Christopher Winter may refer to:

- Christopher Winter (pirate), English pirate
- Christopher Winter (artist), English artist
- W. Christopher Winter, American sleep researcher, neurologist and author

== See also ==
- Chris Winter (disambiguation)
