= List of awards and nominations received by Michael Douglas =

Michael Douglas awards and nominations
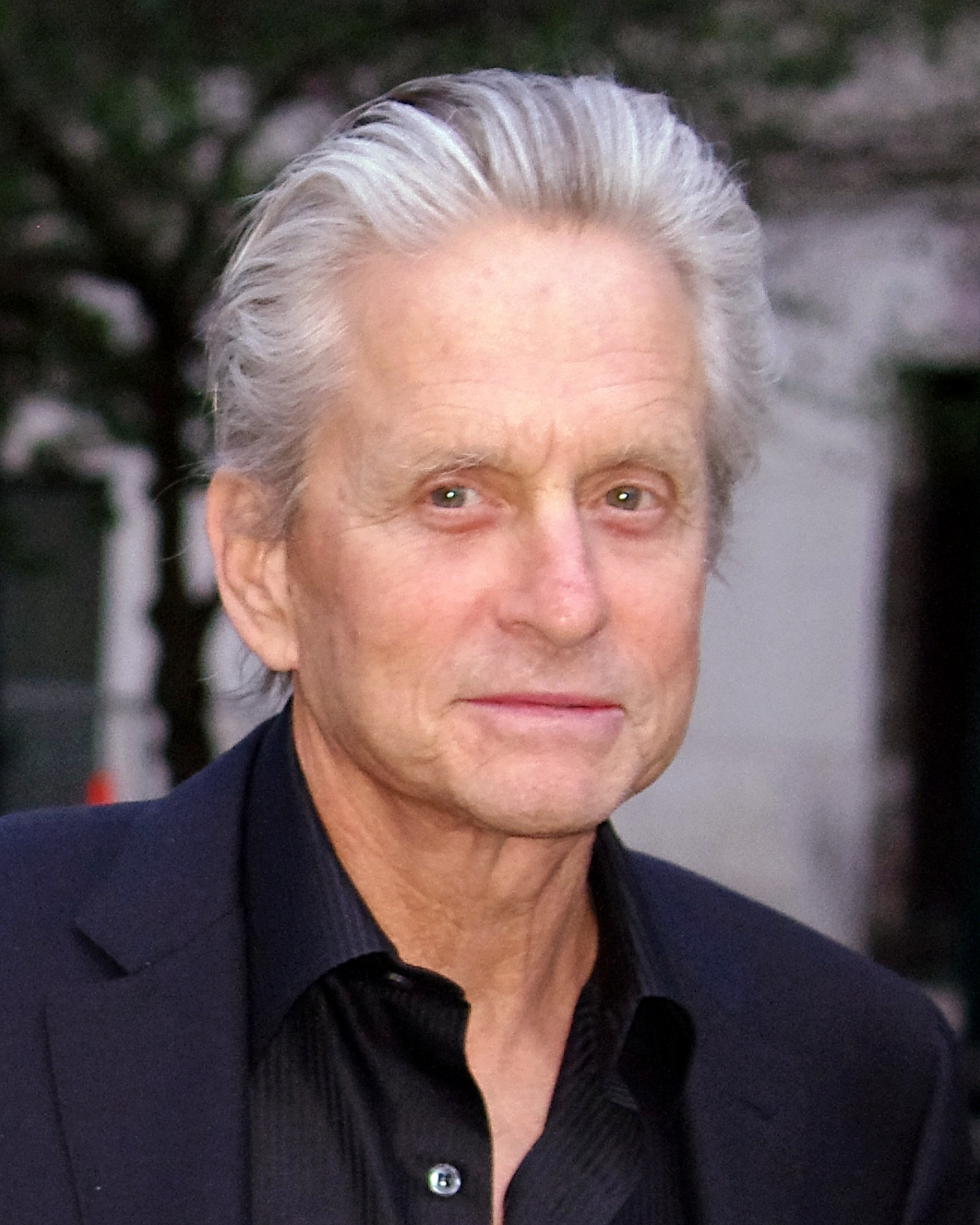
- Douglas in 2012
Awards and nominations
| Award | Wins | Nominations |
| Academy Awards | 2 | 2 |
| BAFTA Awards | 1 | 3 |
| Primetime Emmy Awards | 1 | 10 |
| Golden Globe Awards | 3 | 10 |
| SAG Awards | 2 | 8 |

Totals (Note: Certain award groups do not simply award one winner. They acknowledge several different recipients, have runners-up, and have third place. Since this is a specific recognition and is different from losing an award, runner-up mentions are considered wins in this award tally. For simplification and to avoid errors, each award in this list has been presumed to have had a prior nomination.)
- Wins: 30
- Nominations: 96

This is a List of awards and nominations received by Michael Douglas.

Michael Douglas is an American actor and producer known for his starring roles in film and television. Over his career he has received two Academy Awards, a BAFTA Award, three Golden Globe Awards, a Primetime Emmy Award, and two Screen Actors Guild Awards. He has received several honors including the AFI Life Achievement Award in 2009, two Honorary Césars in 1998 and 2016, a Film Society at Lincoln Center Gala Tribute in 2010, a Golden Globe Cecil B. DeMille Award in 2004, and a Star on the Hollywood Walk of Fame in 2018.

Douglas won two Academy Awards, his first for Best Picture for producing the drama One Flew Over the Cuckoo's Nest (1975), and Best Actor for his role as Gordon Gekko in the drama film Wall Street (1987). The later also won him the Golden Globe Award for Best Actor in a Motion Picture – Musical or Comedy. He was BAFTA-nominated for his performances in the thriller Fatal Attraction (1987) and the drama Wonder Boys (2000). He won the Screen Actors Guild Award for Outstanding Performance by a Cast in a Motion Picture alongside the ensemble of Traffic (2000).

On television, he portrayed Liberace in the HBO television film Behind the Candelabra (2013) for which he received the Primetime Emmy Award for Outstanding Lead Actor in a Limited or Anthology Series or Movie, the Golden Globe Award for Best Actor – Miniseries or Television Film, and the Screen Actors Guild Award for Outstanding Actor in a Miniseries or Television Movie. For his leading role in the Netflix comedy The Kominsky Method (2018–2021) he was nominated for the Primetime Emmy Award for Outstanding Lead Actor in a Comedy Series, the Golden Globe Award for Best Actor – Television Series Musical or Comedy, and the Screen Actors Guild Award for Outstanding Actor in a Comedy Series.

== Major associations ==
=== Academy Awards ===
| Year | Category | Nominated work | Result | Ref. |
|---|---|---|---|---|
| 1976 | Best Picture (Note: Shared with Saul Zaentz) | One Flew Over the Cuckoo's Nest | Won | |
| 1988 | Best Actor | Wall Street | Won | |

=== BAFTA Awards ===
| Year | Category | Nominated work | Result | Ref. |
|---|---|---|---|---|
| 1977 | Best Picture | One Flew Over the Cuckoo's Nest | Won | |
| 1989 | Best Actor in a Leading Role | Fatal Attraction | Nominated | |
| 2001 | Best Actor in a Leading Role | Wonder Boys | Nominated | |

=== Emmy Awards ===
| Year | Category | Nominated work | Result | Ref. |
Primetime Emmy Awards
| 1974 | Outstanding Supporting Actor in a Drama Series | The Streets of San Francisco | Nominated | |
| 1975 | Outstanding Supporting Actor in a Drama Series | The Streets of San Francisco | Nominated | |
| 1976 | Outstanding Supporting Actor in a Drama Series | The Streets of San Francisco | Nominated | |
| 2002 | Outstanding Guest Actor in a Comedy Series | Will & Grace | Nominated | |
| 2013 | Outstanding Lead Actor in a Miniseries or a Movie | Behind the Candelabra | Won | |
| 2019 | Outstanding Lead Actor in a Comedy Series | The Kominsky Method | Nominated | |
| 2020 | Outstanding Lead Actor in a Comedy Series | The Kominsky Method | Nominated | |
| 2020 | Outstanding Comedy Series | The Kominsky Method | Nominated | |
| 2021 | Outstanding Lead Actor in a Comedy Series | The Kominsky Method | Nominated | |
| 2021 | Outstanding Comedy Series | The Kominsky Method | Nominated | |

=== Golden Globe Awards ===
| Year | Category | Nominated work | Result | Ref. |
|---|---|---|---|---|
| 1970 | Most Promising Male Newcomer | Hail, Hero! | Nominated | |
| 1975 | Best Actor – Television Series Drama | The Streets of San Francisco | Nominated | |
| 1988 | Best Actor – Motion Picture Drama | Wall Street | Won | |
| 1990 | Best Actor – Motion Picture Musical or Comedy | The War of the Roses | Nominated | |
| 1996 | Best Actor – Motion Picture Musical or Comedy | The American President | Nominated | |
| 2001 | Best Actor – Motion Picture Drama | Wonder Boys | Nominated | |
| 2004 | Cecil B. DeMille Award | — | Honored | |
| 2011 | Best Supporting Actor – Motion Picture | Wall Street: Money Never Sleeps | Nominated | |
| 2014 | Best Actor – Miniseries or Television Film | Behind the Candelabra | Won | |
| 2019 | Best Actor – Television Series Musical or Comedy | The Kominsky Method | Won | |
| 2020 | Best Actor – Television Series Musical or Comedy | The Kominsky Method | Nominated | |

=== Screen Actors Guild Awards ===
| Year | Category | Nominated work | Result | Ref. |
|---|---|---|---|---|
| 2001 | Outstanding Cast in a Motion Picture | Traffic | Won | |
| 2014 | Outstanding Actor in a Miniseries or Television Movie | Behind the Candelabra | Won | |
| 2019 | Outstanding Actor in a Comedy Series | The Kominsky Method | Nominated | |
| 2019 | Outstanding Ensemble in a Comedy Series | The Kominsky Method | Nominated | |
| 2020 | Outstanding Actor in a Comedy Series | The Kominsky Method | Nominated | |
| 2020 | Outstanding Ensemble in a Comedy Series | The Kominsky Method | Nominated | |
| 2022 | Outstanding Actor in a Comedy Series | The Kominsky Method | Nominated | |
| 2022 | Outstanding Ensemble in a Comedy Series | The Kominsky Method | Nominated | |

== Miscellaneous accolades ==
| Award | Year | Category | For | Result | Ref. |
|---|---|---|---|---|---|
| Alliance of Women Film Journalists Awards | 2010 | Most Egregious Age Difference Between the Leading Man and the Love Interest | Solitary Man | Won | |
| Alliance of Women Film Journalists Awards | 2013 | Most Egregious Age Difference Between the Leading Man and the Love Interest | Last Vegas | Won | |
| Blockbuster Entertainment Awards | 1999 | Favorite Actor - Suspense | A Perfect Murder | Nominated | |
| Blockbuster Entertainment Awards | 2001 | Favorite Actor - Drama | Traffic | Nominated | |
| Chicago Film Critics Association Awards | 2001 | Best Actor | Wonder Boys | Nominated | |
| Critics' Choice Television Awards | 2013 | Best Actor in a Movie/Miniseries | Behind the Candelabra | Won | |
| Critics' Choice Television Awards | 2019 | Best Actor in a Comedy Series | The Kominsky Method | Nominated | |
| Dallas–Fort Worth Film Critics Association Awards | 2001 | Best Actor | Wonder Boys | 2nd Place | |
| Dallas–Fort Worth Film Critics Association Awards | 2010 | Best Actor | Solitary Man | Nominated | |
| David di Donatello Awards | 1988 | Best Foreign Actor | Fatal Attraction | Nominated | |
| David di Donatello Awards | 1988 | Best Foreign Actor | Wall Street | Won | |
| David di Donatello Awards | 1990 | Best Foreign Actor | The War of the Roses | Nominated | |
| Dublin Film Critics' Circle Awards | 2013 | Best Actor | Behind the Candelabra | 3rd Place | |
| Dorian Awards | 2014 | TV Performance of the Year – Actor | Behind the Candelabra | Won | |
| Genie Awards | 1980 | Best Performance by a Foreign Actor | Running | Nominated | |
| Gold Derby Awards | 2013 | Best Actor – Miniseries or Television Film | Behind the Candelabra | Won | |
| Gold Derby Awards | 2019 | Best Actor in a Comedy Series | The Kominsky Method | Nominated | |
| Gold Derby Awards | 2019 | TV Movie/Mini Actor of the Decade | Behind the Candelabra | Nominated | |
| Golden Raspberry Awards | 1993 | Worst Actor | Basic Instinct | Nominated | |
| Golden Raspberry Awards | 1993 | Worst Actor | Shining Through | Nominated | |
| Golden Raspberry Awards | 2024 | Worst Supporting Actor | Ant-Man and the Wasp: Quantumania | Nominated | |
| Goldene Kamera | 1990 | Best International Actor | Wall Street; Fatal Attraction | Won | |
| Guardian Film Awards | 2014 | Best Line of Dialogue | Behind the Candelabra | Won | |
| Hasty Pudding Theatricals | 1992 | Man of the Year | — | Won | |
| Irish Film & Television Awards | 2014 | Best International Actor | Behind the Candelabra | Won | |
| Nastro d'Argento | 1988 | Best Foreign Actor | Wall Street | Won | |
| Jupiter Awards | 1988 | Best International Actor | Wall Street | Won | |
| Jupiter Awards | 2014 | Best International Actor | Behind the Candelabra | Nominated | |
| London Critics Circle Film Awards | 2001 | Actor of the Year | Wonder Boys | Nominated | |
| London Critics Circle Film Awards | 2014 | Actor of the Year | Behind the Candelabra | Nominated | |
| Los Angeles Film Critics Association Awards | 2000 | Best Actor | Wonder Boys | Won | |
| MTV Movie Awards | 1993 | Best Male Performance | Basic Instinct | Nominated | |
| MTV Movie Awards | 1993 | Best On-Screen Duo (Note: Shared with Sharon Stone) | Basic Instinct | Nominated | |
| National Board of Review Awards | 1987 | Best Actor | Wall Street | Won | |
| New York Film Critics Circle Awards | 1987 | Best Actor | Wall Street | 2nd Place | |
| Online Film Critics Society Awards | 2000 | Best Actor | Wonder Boys | Nominated | |
| People's Choice Awards | 1988 | Favorite Motion Picture Actor | — | Won | |
| People's Choice Awards | 1990 | Favorite Motion Picture Actor | — | Nominated | |
| Phoenix Film Critics Society Awards | 2001 | Best Actor in a Leading Role | Wonder Boys | Nominated | |
| Santa Barbara International Film Festival | 1995 | Modern Master Award | Disclosure | Won | |
| Sant Jordi Awards | 1989 | Best Foreign Actor | Wall Street | Nominated | |
| Satellite Awards | 2001 | Best Actor – Motion Picture Musical or Comedy | Wonder Boys | Won | |
| Satellite Awards | 2010 | Best Actor – Motion Picture Drama | Solitary Man | Nominated | |
| Satellite Awards | 2014 | Best Actor – Miniseries or Television Film | Behind the Candelabra | Won | |
| Satellite Awards | 2020 | Best Actor – Television Series Musical or Comedy | The Kominsky Method | Nominated | |
| Saturn Awards | 2016 | Best Supporting Actor | Ant-Man | Nominated | |
| ShoWest Convention | 1979 | Star/Producer of the Year | — | Won | |
| Southeastern Film Critics Association Awards | 2001 | Best Actor (Note: Tied with Javier Bardem for Before Night Falls (2000)) | Wonder Boys | Won | |

== Honorary awards ==
| Organizations | Year | Award | Result | Ref. |
|---|---|---|---|---|
| César Awards | 1998 | Honorary César | Honored | |
| César Awards | 2016 | Honorary César (for the second time) | Honored | |
| Costume Designers Guild Awards | 2009 | President's Award | Honored | |
| Film Society of Lincoln Center | 2010 | Gala Tribute | Honored | |
| Hollywood Foreign Press Association | 2004 | Cecil B. DeMille Award | Honored | |
| Hollywood Walk of Fame | 2018 | Star on the Walk of Fame | Honored | |
| Karlovy Vary International Film Festival | 1998 | Outstanding Contribution to World Cinema | Honored | |
| National Board of Review | 2007 | Career Achievement Award | Honored | |
| Palm Springs International Film Festival | 2011 | Icon Award | Honored | |
| Producers Guild of America Awards | 2009 | Lifetime Achievement Award in Motion Pictures | Honored | |
| San Sebastián International Film Festival | 1997 | Donostia Lifetime Achievement Award | Honored | |
| Taormina International Film Festival | 2004 | Taormina Arte Award | Honored | |
| Zurich Film Festival | 2010 | Golden Icon Award | Honored | |

== See also ==
- Michael Douglas on stage and screen

== Bibliography ==
- Franks, Don (2004). Entertainment Awards: A Music, Cinema, Theatre and Broadcasting Guide, 1928 through 2003 (3rd ed.). McFarland. ISBN 978-1-4766-0806-8.
