= Asher Edelman =

American financier

Asher B. Edelman
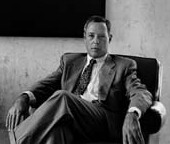
- Asher Edelman, 1993, by Erling Mandelmann
- Born: November 26, 1939 (age 86); New York City, US
- Education: Bard College
- Occupations: Investor, art collector
- Spouses: Antonia Patricia Simpson; Penelope Cox; Maria Regina Leal Costa Mayall; Michelle Vrebalovic
- Children: 4

Asher Barry Edelman (born November 26, 1939) is an American financier.

== Biography ==
Edelman is the son of New York real estate investor, Richard M. Edelman. He graduated from Bard College and in 1961, he went to work for Halle and Stieglitz where he focused on option arbitrage and became the youngest (24 years old) New York Stock Exchange approved office manager. He founded Mack, Bushnell & Edelman in 1969, and served as CEO. Edelman's Wall Street businesses included investment banking, money management, and derivatives trading. In 1988, he taught a course called "Corporate Raiding – The Art of War" at Columbia Business School, using as his textbook Sun Tzu's The Art of War. The character of Gordon Gekko in Wall Street was based in part on Edelman, primarily his art collecting.

In 1988, he moved to Switzerland and founded a contemporary art museum in Pully, near Lausanne. The FAE Musée d'Art Contemporain launched the first European retrospective exhibitions of Robert Mapplethorpe, Jean-Michel Basquiat, Roy Lichtenstein, and Peter Halley. It also was the first venue for "Post Human" an exhibition co-curated by Chantal Prod'hom of the FAE and Jeffrey Deitch.

In 2002, he created the company Edelman Arts Inc., a dealer in Impressionism through post war art, which also represents contemporary artists including Doug Argue, Yasmine Chatila, Cathy McClure and Christopher Winter.

Edelman is the founder and president of ArtAssure Ltd., an art finance firm founded in 2010.

In 2014, he launched Artemus, an art leasing business. Artemus buys art from owners and then leases it back, typically for seven years. The other shareholders in Artemus are the Durst Organization and Armory Merchant Holdings.

Edelman has served on many boards of trustees of art and educational institutions including past chairman of the board of Brooklyn Academy of Music, vice chairman of American Ballet Theatre, vice chairman of the Alvin Ailey Dance Theater, chairman of Robert Wilson's Watermill Center (1999-2000), chairman of the Karole Armitage Dance Group, board member of the Prix de Lausanne, Gotham Chamber Opera, and many others. He presently serves on the board of Bard College.

In an interview with CNBC on March 9, 2016, Edelman endorsed Bernie Sanders as the next US president citing the falling velocity of money and Sanders' platform of stimulative fiscal policy.

Asher Edelman founded M&A Arts S.A.R.L in 2023 in partnership with Michelle Edelman. M&A Arts offers deep knowledge and expertise in the financial aspects of the art market.

== Disputes ==
In 2007 Edelman loaned Courier 1, a painting by American painter Robert Ryman, to the Swiss-based Galerie Gmurzynska for exhibition at Art Basel Miami Beach. After its return, the painting was sent to a dealer in New York for consignment, but was found to be damaged. According to Edelman, the painting had a "big gouge", rendering the artwork "a total loss". The painting had been insured for $750,000 with Edelman's insurer, XL Specialty Insurance. Edelman claimed that the Gmurzynska had disputed the case and had instructed its own insurer not to pay. XL Specialty Insurance made Edelman its assignee, and he then sued the gallery for $750,000 plus a further $250,000 for "willful conduct of defendant" and "reprehensible motives and such wanton dishonesty as to imply a criminal indifference to civil obligations." In October 2009 a New York district court awarded a judgement of $767,438 against the gallery. Using a writ of execution for an unanswered lawsuit, Edelman arranged for the US Marshals Service to confiscate some of the gallery's works at the opening of the Art Basel Miami Beach fair. Marshals removed four paintings which Edelman valued at $6 million. The gallery denied instructing its insurer to withhold payment and claimed that they had no knowledge of the judgement; they paid up and the paintings were returned to the stand.

In 2010 Edelman was sued by Emigrant Savings Bank over $3 million of loans. Collateral on the loans included a sculpture by Alberto Giacometti, Torse de Femme. Edelmann sold the sculpture and paid the debt plus $1.1 million in court judgements. He then sued Emigrant for fraud.

In February 2014 Edelman's company ArtAssure sued the Swiss company Artmentum for breach of contract and allegedly fraudulent representations. ArtAssure were offered a collection of over 100 paintings from the 19th and 20th centuries, supposed to have been in the ownership of Hiroshima Bank of Japan, at a discounted price of €350 million. The sale was contingent on the purchase being made through Artmentum for confidentiality. After several months of negotiations, Artmentum failed to provide evidence that they were authorised to sell the collection. The claim for $204 million was brought before a judge in a New York court. The claim was dismissed on the grounds that Artmentum was a Swiss company, with few commercial activities in the US, and therefore the case was outside the jurisdiction of the court.

In April 2011, Edelman was sued by a limited partner of his in an investment vehicle, Museum Partners LP, of which Edelman was the general partner. This lawsuit was primarily for breach of fiduciary duty and called for very substantial reparations. This suit was ultimately dismissed by the court on the technicality that the plaintiff no longer had standing as a limited partner by reason of having agreed to an oral contract alleged by Edelman to purchase the interest of the limited partner in the partnership. However, the decision of the court did result in a final judgment against Edelman of about $250,000 and accruing interest.

In January 2021, the Southern District Court of New York ordered the Swiss Business Council of Abu Dhabi to pay Edelman Arts for lost commissions on a deal worth $26.8m that never went through.

== Personal life ==
Edelman has been married four times. His first wife was English-born Antonia Patricia Simpson (married 1964), the daughter of Gerald Gordon Simpson, British deputy consul general in New York. His second wife was Penelope Cox Edelman; they had three children: Danielle, Lisa, and Alexandra, before divorcing. His third wife was Brazilian-born Maria Regina Leal Costa Mayall Edelman (married 1987 - divorced 2000). His fourth wife is Michelle Edelman is also the co-founder of M&A Arts sArl. Their son Christopher Edelman (born 1998) is a music producer who goes by the name ProdbyGekko. He is the founder New Gotham Studios in New York City.
