= Michael Douglas on stage and screen =

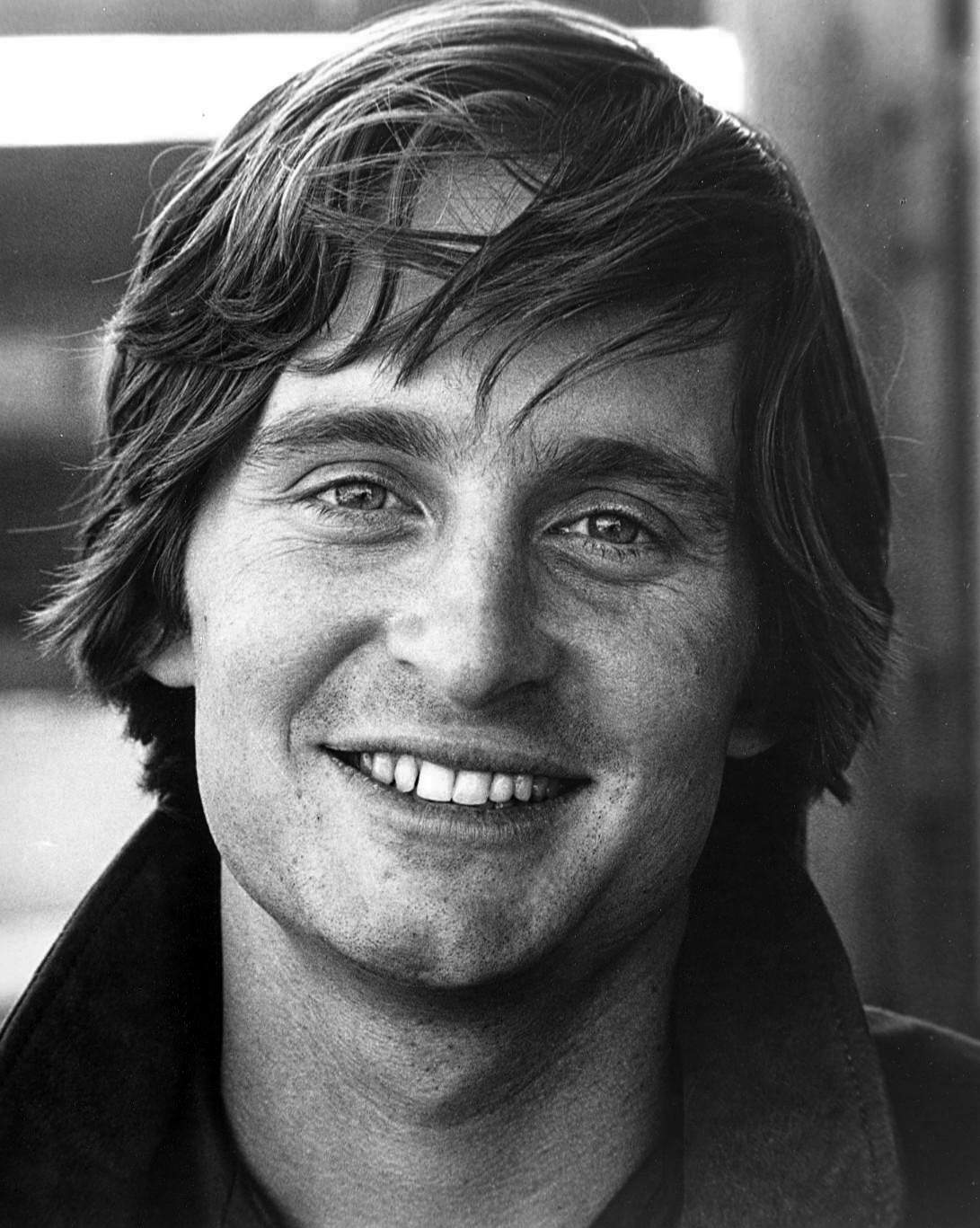
Douglas in 1969

American actor and producer Michael Douglas began his film career with a brief uncredited role in Cast a Giant Shadow (1966). In the same year he played a small role in the play Bedford Forrest. His performance in Hail, Hero! (1969) earned him a nomination for the Golden Globe Award for Most Promising Male Newcomer. He won the 1971 Theatre World Award for Pinkville. During 1972–76, he played the lead role in the TV series The Streets of San Francisco. In 1975, Douglas produced One Flew Over the Cuckoo's Nest which won the Academy Award for Best Picture, Golden Globe for Best Picture and BAFTA Award for Best Film.

Douglas' role of Gordon Gekko in Oliver Stone's Wall Street (1987) won him the Academy Award for Best Actor. For his portrayal of a fictional American president in the 1995 comedy The American President, he was nominated for the Golden Globe Award for Best Actor – Motion Picture Musical or Comedy. His performance in Wonder Boys (2000) earned him nominations for the BAFTA Award for Best Actor in a Leading Role and Golden Globe Award for Best Actor – Motion Picture Drama.

He shared the Screen Actors Guild Award for Outstanding Performance by a Cast in a Motion Picture with his co-actors in Traffic (2000). He reprised the role of Gekko in Wall Street: Money Never Sleeps (2010) and was nominated for the Golden Globe Award for Best Supporting Actor – Motion Picture for the same. Douglas' portrayal of Liberace in Behind the Candelabra (2013) earned him the Primetime Emmy Award for Outstanding Lead Actor in a Miniseries or a Movie.

For his contributions to the film industry, Douglas won the 2004 Golden Globe Cecil B. DeMille Award and the 2009 AFI Life Achievement Award.

== Film ==
=== Feature film ===
Year	Title	Role	Notes	Ref(s)
1966	Cast a Giant Shadow	Jeep Driver	Uncredited	
1969	Hail, Hero!	Carl Dixon		
1970	Adam at 6 A.M.	Adam Gaines		
1971	Summertree	Jerry		
1972	Napoleon and Samantha	Danny		
1975	One Flew Over the Cuckoo's Nest	—N/a	Producer only	
1978	Coma	Dr. Mark Bellows		
1979	The China Syndrome	Richard Adams	Also producer	
1979	Running	Michael Andropolis		
1980	It's My Turn	Ben Lewin		
1983	The Star Chamber	Judge Steven R. Hardin		
1984	Romancing the Stone	Jack Colton	Also producer	
1984	Starman	—N/a	Executive producer only	
1985	The Jewel of the Nile	Jack Colton	Also producer	
1985	A Chorus Line	Zach		
1987	Fatal Attraction	Dan Gallagher		
1987	Wall Street	Gordon Gekko		
1989	Black Rain	Nick Conklin		
1989	The War of the Roses	Oliver Rose		
1990	Flatliners	—N/a	Producer only	
1991	Stone Cold	—N/a	Producer only; uncredited	
1991	Double Impact	—N/a	Producer only	
1991	Eyes of an Angel	—N/a	Executive producer only	
1992	Shining Through	Ed Leland		
1992	Radio Flyer	—N/a	Executive producer only	
1992	Basic Instinct	Detective Nick Curran		
1993	Falling Down	William "D-Fens" Foster		
1993	Made in America	—N/a	Producer only	
1994	Disclosure	Tom Sanders		
1995	The American President	President Andrew Shepherd		
1996	The Ghost and the Darkness	Charles Remington	Also executive producer	
1997	Face/Off	—N/a	Executive producer only	
1997	The Game	Nicholas Van Orton		
1997	The Rainmaker	—N/a	Producer only	
1998	A Perfect Murder	Steven Taylor		
2000	Wonder Boys	Professor Grady Tripp		
2000	Traffic	Robert Wakefield		
2001	One Night at McCool's	Mr. Burmeister	Also producer	
2001	Don't Say a Word	Nathan Conrad		
2003	It Runs in the Family	Alex Gromberg	Also producer	
2003	The In-Laws	Steve Tobias		
2006	The Sentinel	Pete Garrison	Also producer	
2006	You, Me and Dupree	Mr. Thompson		
2007	King of California	Charlie		
2009	Ghosts of Girlfriends Past	Wayne Mead		
2009	Beyond a Reasonable Doubt	Mark Hunter		
2009	Solitary Man	Ben Kalmen		
2010	Wall Street: Money Never Sleeps	Gordon Gekko		
2011	Haywire	Alex Coblenz		
2013	Last Vegas	Billy Gherson		
2014	And So It Goes	Oren Little		
2014	Beyond the Reach	John Madec	Also producer	
2015	Ant-Man	Hank Pym / Ant-Man		
2017	Unlocked	Eric Lasch		
2017	Flatliners	—N/a	Producer only	
2018	Animal World	Anderson		
2018	We Have Always Lived in the Castle	—N/a	Producer only	
2018	Ant-Man and the Wasp	Hank Pym / Ant-Man		
2019	Avengers: Endgame	Hank Pym / Ant-Man		
2023	Ant-Man and the Wasp: Quantumania	Hank Pym / Ant-Man		
2025	Looking Through Water	William McKay		
TBA	White Lies †		Post-production	

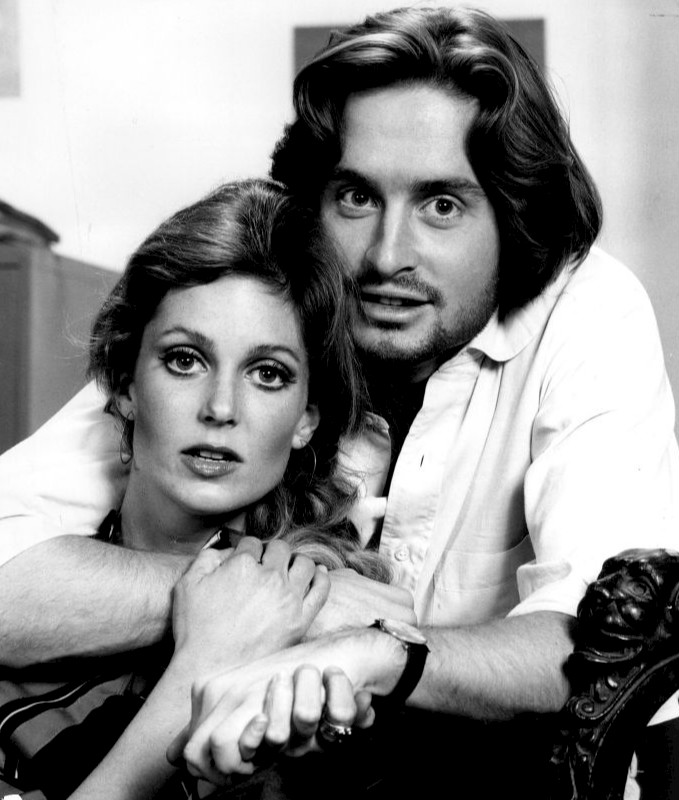
Douglas (right) made his television debut in the play "The Experiment" (1969)

=== Documentary and short film ===
Year	Title	Role	Notes	Ref(s)
1972	American Revolution: The Impossible War	John Laurens	Short film	
1972	American Heritage: The Cause of Liberty	John Laurens	Short film	
1997	Completely Cuckoo	Himself	Documentary	
1999	Get Bruce	Himself	Documentary	
1999	One Day in September	Narrator	Documentary	
2007	Dinosaurs Alive!	Narrator	Documentary	
2007	Trumbo	Himself	Documentary	
2010	Nuclear Tipping Point	Narrator	Documentary	
2013	Supermensch: The Legend of Shep Gordon	Narrator	Documentary	
2013	The Prime Ministers: The Pioneers	Yitzhak Rabin	Voice; documentary	
2024	America's Burning	Narrator	Documentary	

== Television ==
Year(s)	Title	Role	Notes	Ref(s)
1969	CBS Playhouse	Young Scientist	Episode: "The Experiment"; credited as M. K. Douglas	
1971	The F.B.I.	Jerry	Episode: "The Hitchhiker"	
1971	Medical Center	Jonathan Crowley	Episode: "The Albatross"	
1972	When Michael Calls	Craig	Television film	
1972–1976	The Streets of San Francisco	Inspector Steve Keller	Main role; also directed episode: "Spooks for Sale" (1975)	
1980	Celebrity Challenge of the Sexes	Himself	Season 4	
1984	Saturday Night Live	Himself	Host; episode: "Michael Douglas/Deniece Williams"	
1986–1987	Starman	—N/a	Executive producer only	
1988	World's Greatest Stunts: A Tribute to Hollywood's Stuntmen	Himself	Television documentary	
1990	If Dolphins Could Talk	Narrator	Television documentary	
1990	That's What Friends Are For: Arista Records 15th Anniversary Concert	Himself	Television documentary	
1990	Tribute to John Lennon	Host	Television documentary	
1990	The Earth Day Special	Himself	Television special	
1992	Oliver Stone: Inside Out	Himself	Television documentary	
1993	Rock the Vote	Himself	Television film	
1997	Burt Lancaster	Himself	Television film	
1998	To Life! America Celebrates Israel's 50th	Co-host	Television special	
1998	Where It's At: The Rolling Stone State of the Union	Himself	Television documentary	
2000	We All Dream of Oz	Himself	Television documentary	
2001	Independence Day 2001	Himself	Television film	
2002	Will & Grace	Detective Gavin Hatch	Episode: "Fagel Attraction"	
2002	Liberty's Kids	Patrick Henry	Voice; episodes: "Liberty or Death" & "United We Stand"	
2003	What's Going On?	Host	Episode: "Child Soldiers in Sierra Leone"; documentary series	
2003	Freedom: A History of US	Benjamin Franklin / Benjamin French	Voice; episodes: "Revolution" as Benjamin Franklin & "A War to End Slavery" as Benjamin French	
2005	... A Father... A Son... Once Upon a Time in Hollywood	Himself	Television documentary	
2011	Phineas and Ferb	Waylon	Voice; episode: "That's the Spirit/The Curse of Candace"	
2013	Behind the Candelabra	Liberace	Television film	
2014	Richard Attenborough: A Life in Film	Himself	Documentary	
2018–2021	The Kominsky Method	Sandy Kominsky	Main role; also executive producer	
2019–2022	Green Eggs and Ham	Guy-Am-I	Voice; main role	
2020	Ratched	—N/a	Executive producer only	
2021–2023	What If...?	Hank Pym / Yellowjacket / Ant-Man	Voice; episodes: "What If... the World Lost Its Mightiest Heroes?" & "What If... Peter Quill Attacked Earth's Mightiest Heroes?"	
2023	Marvel Studios: Assembled	Himself	Episode: "The Making of Ant-Man and the Wasp: Quantumania"	
2024	Franklin	Benjamin Franklin	Miniseries; also executive producer	

== Stage ==
Year(s)	Production	Theater	Role	Notes	Ref(s)
1966	Bedford Forrest	Eugene O'Neill Theater Center	Soldier		
1969–1970	The Whistling Wizard and the Sultan of Tuffet	Bil Baird Marionette Theater	—N/a	Understudy	
1970–1971	Pinkville	The American Place Theatre	Jerry the Naz		

== Music video ==
Year	Title	Artist	Note(s)	Ref.
1985	"When the Going Gets Tough, the Tough Get Going"	Billy Ocean		
2000	"Things Have Changed"	Bob Dylan		

== See also ==
- List of awards and nominations received by Michael Douglas

== Bibliography ==
- American Film Institute (1997). The American Film Institute Catalog of Motion Pictures Produced in the United States. University of California Press. ISBN 978-0-520-20970-1.
- Booker, Keith M. (2011). Historical Dictionary of American Cinema. Scarecrow Press. ISBN 978-0-8108-7459-6.
- Boozer, Jack (2010). Career Movies: American Business and the Success Mystique. University of Texas Press. ISBN 978-0-292-78314-0.
- Browne, Ray Broadus; Browne, Pat (2001). The Guide to United States Popular Culture. Popular Press. ISBN 978-0-87972-821-2.
- Dougan, Andy (2001). Michael Douglas: Out of the Shadows : the Unauthorised Biography. Robson. ISBN 978-1-86105-347-3.
- Ebert, Roger (1997). Roger Ebert's Video Companion. Andrews McMeel Publishing. ISBN 978-0-8362-3688-0.
- Ebert, Roger (2005). Roger Ebert's Movie Yearbook 2006. Andrews McMeel Publishing. p. 324. ISBN 978-0-7407-5538-5.
- Ebert, Roger (2012). Roger Ebert's Movie Yearbook 2013: 25th Anniversary Edition. Andrews McMeel Publishing. ISBN 978-1-4494-2311-7.
- Edgington, K; Erskine, Thomas; Welsh, James M. (2010). Encyclopedia of Sports Films. Scarecrow Press. ISBN 978-0-8108-7653-8.
- Gunn, Drewey Wayne (2012). The Gay Male Sleuth in Print and Film: A History and Annotated Bibliography. Scarecrow Press. ISBN 978-0-8108-8589-9.
- Harper, Stephen (2009). Madness, power and the media: class, gender and race in popular representations of mental distress (illustrated ed.). Palgrave Macmillan. ISBN 978-0-230-21880-2.
- Hischak, Thomas S. (2012). American Literature on Stage and Screen: 525 Works and Their Adaptations. McFarland. ISBN 978-0-7864-9279-4.
- Ibrahim, Mo (2013). The Allure of Nymphets: From Emperor Augustus to Woody Allen Man's Fascination with Young Women. Lad Literature. ISBN 978-1-938022-40-1.
- Kachmar, Diane C. (2002). Roy Scheider: A Film Biography. McFarland. ISBN 978-0-7864-1201-3.
- Kagan, Norman (2003). The Cinema of Robert Zemeckis. Taylor Trade Publishing. ISBN 978-1-4616-9905-7.
- Kolker, Robert Phillip (2011). A Cinema of Loneliness. Oxford University Press, USA. ISBN 978-0-19-973888-5.
- Levi, Ross D. (2005). The Celluloid Courtroom: A History of Legal Cinema. Greenwood Publishing Group. ISBN 978-0-275-98233-1.
- Martin, Mick; Bang, Derrick (1994). Video Movie Guide 1995. Random House Publishing Group. ISBN 978-0-345-39027-1.
- Mayer, Ruth (2002). Artificial Africas: Colonial Images in the Times of Globalization. UPNE. ISBN 978-1-58465-192-5.
- McKenna, Michael (2013). The ABC Movie of the Week: Big Movies for the Small Screen. Scarecrow Press. ISBN 978-0-8108-9157-9.
- Milano, Valerie (2000). Gwyneth Paltrow. ECW Press. ISBN 978-1-55022-407-8.
- Mordden, Ethan (2013). Anything Goes: A History of American Musical Theatre. OUP USA. ISBN 978-0-19-989283-9.
- National Archives and Records Administration (1988). Celebrating the Constitution: A Bicentennial Retrospective. Washington, DC: National Archives Trust Fund Board. ISBN 978-0-9113-3371-8. OCLC 17876151.
- Parker, John (July 21, 2011). Michael Douglas: Acting on Instinct. Headline. ISBN 978-0-7553-6286-8.
- Roman, James (2009). Bigger Than Blockbusters: Movies That Defined America: Movies That Defined America. ABC-CLIO. ISBN 978-0-313-08740-0.
- Schiller, Kay; Young, Chris (2010). The 1972 Munich Olympics and the Making of Modern Germany. University of California Press. ISBN 978-0-520-94758-0.
- Solomons, Gabriel (2011). World Film Locations: Los Angeles. Intellect Books. ISBN 978-1-84150-485-8.
- Terrace, Vincent (1985). Encyclopedia of Television Series, Pilots and Specials. VNR AG. ISBN 978-0-918432-61-2.
- Terrace, Vincent (2008). Encyclopedia of Television Shows, 1925 through 2010, 2d ed. McFarland. ISBN 978-0-7864-8641-0.
- Terrace, Vincent (2013). Television Specials: 5,336 Entertainment Programs, 1936-2012 (2nd ed.). McFarland. ISBN 978-1-4766-1240-9.
- Williams, Linda Ruth (2005). The Erotic Thriller in Contemporary Cinema. Indiana University Press. ISBN 0-253-21836-5.
- Wilson, John (2007). The Official Razzie Movie Guide: Enjoying the Best of Hollywood's Worst. Grand Central Publishing. ISBN 978-0-446-51008-0.
