= List of film misquotes =

Following is a list of film misquotes, ordered by release date. Quotes may be changed for a number of reasons. Long ones, such as Apocalypse Now's "I love the smell of napalm ..." or Gold Hat's rant about badges in The Treasure of the Sierra Madre, may be shortened. Sometimes misquotes improve the "rhythm or cadence" of the original; for example, Mae West's "Why don't you come up sometime and see me?" becomes "Why don't you come up and see me sometime?"

Misquote	Actual line(s)	Character	Actor/actress	Film	Year
Well, here's another fine mess you've gotten us into.	Well, here's another nice mess you've gotten me into.	Various	Oliver Hardy	Various, starting with The Laurel-Hardy Murder Case	1930–1959
Me Tarzan, you Jane.	Jane Parker [pointing to herself]: Jane. Tarzan: Jane. Jane [pointing to Tarzan]: And you? You? Tarzan: Tarzan, Tarzan. Jane: Tarzan! Tarzan [pointing first to Jane, then to himself]: Jane. Tarzan. Jane. Tarzan. Jane. Tarzan. ...	Tarzan	Johnny Weissmuller	Tarzan the Ape Man	1932
Why don't you come up and see me sometime?	Why don't you come up sometime and see me?	Lady Lou	Mae West	She Done Him Wrong	1933
Mirror, mirror, on the wall, who is the fairest of them all?	Magic mirror on the wall, who is the fairest one of all?	Evil Queen	Lucille La Verne (voice)	Snow White and the Seven Dwarfs	1937
Frankly, Scarlett, I don't give a damn.	Frankly, my dear, I don't give a damn.	Rhett Butler	Clark Gable	Gone with the Wind	1939
Toto, I don't think we’re in Kansas anymore.	Toto, I've a feeling we're not in Kansas anymore.	Dorothy Gale	Judy Garland	The Wizard of Oz	1939
Play it again, Sam.	Play it, Sam. Play "As Time Goes By".	Ilsa Lund	Ingrid Bergman	Casablanca	1942
Badges? We don't need no stinkin' badges!	Badges? We ain't got no badges! We don't need no badges! I don't have to show you any stinkin' badges!	"Gold Hat"	Alfonso Bedoya	The Treasure of the Sierra Madre	1948
I'm ready for my close-up, Mr. DeMille.	All right, Mr. DeMille. I'm ready for my close-up.	Norma Desmond	Gloria Swanson	Sunset Boulevard	1950
Fasten your seat belts, it's going to be a bumpy ride.	Fasten your seat belts, it's going to be a bumpy night.	Margo Channing	Bette Davis	All About Eve	1950
Mrs. Robinson, are you trying to seduce me?	Mrs. Robinson, you're trying to seduce me. Aren't you?	Benjamin Braddock	Dustin Hoffman	The Graduate	1967
Do you feel lucky, punk?	You've got to ask yourself one question: "Do I feel lucky?" Well, do ya, punk?	Dirty Harry	Clint Eastwood	Dirty Harry	1971
We're gonna need a bigger boat.	You're gonna need a bigger boat.	Chief Martin Brody	Roy Scheider	Jaws	1975
I love the smell of napalm in the morning. It smells like victory.	I love the smell of napalm in the morning. You know, one time we had a hill bombed for 12 hours. When it was all over, I walked up. We didn't find one of 'em, not one stinkin' dink body. The smell, you know that gasoline smell, the whole hill. Smelled like victory.	Lieutenant Colonel Bill Kilgore	Robert Duvall	Apocalypse Now	1979
Luke, I am your father.	No, I am your father.	Darth Vader	James Earl Jones	The Empire Strikes Back	1980
Greed is good.	The point is, ladies and gentlemen, that greed, for lack of a better word, is good.	Gordon Gekko	Michael Douglas	Wall Street	1987
If you build it, they will come.	If you build it, he will come.	Shoeless Joe Jackson; also a disembodied voice	Ray Liotta	Field of Dreams	1989
Life is like a box of chocolates. You never know what you're gonna get.	Mama always said life was like a box of chocolates. You never know what you're gonna get.	Forrest Gump	Tom Hanks	Forrest Gump	1994

== See also ==
- AFI's 100 Years...100 Movie Quotes
