= Cyrtodactylus gordongekkoi =

Conservation status
- Critically Endangered (IUCN 3.1)

Scientific classification
- Kingdom: Animalia
- Phylum: Chordata
- Class: Reptilia
- Order: Squamata
- Suborder: Gekkota
- Family: Gekkonidae
- Genus: Cyrtodactylus
- Species: C. gordongekkoi

Binomial name
- Cyrtodactylus gordongekkoi (Das, 1994)
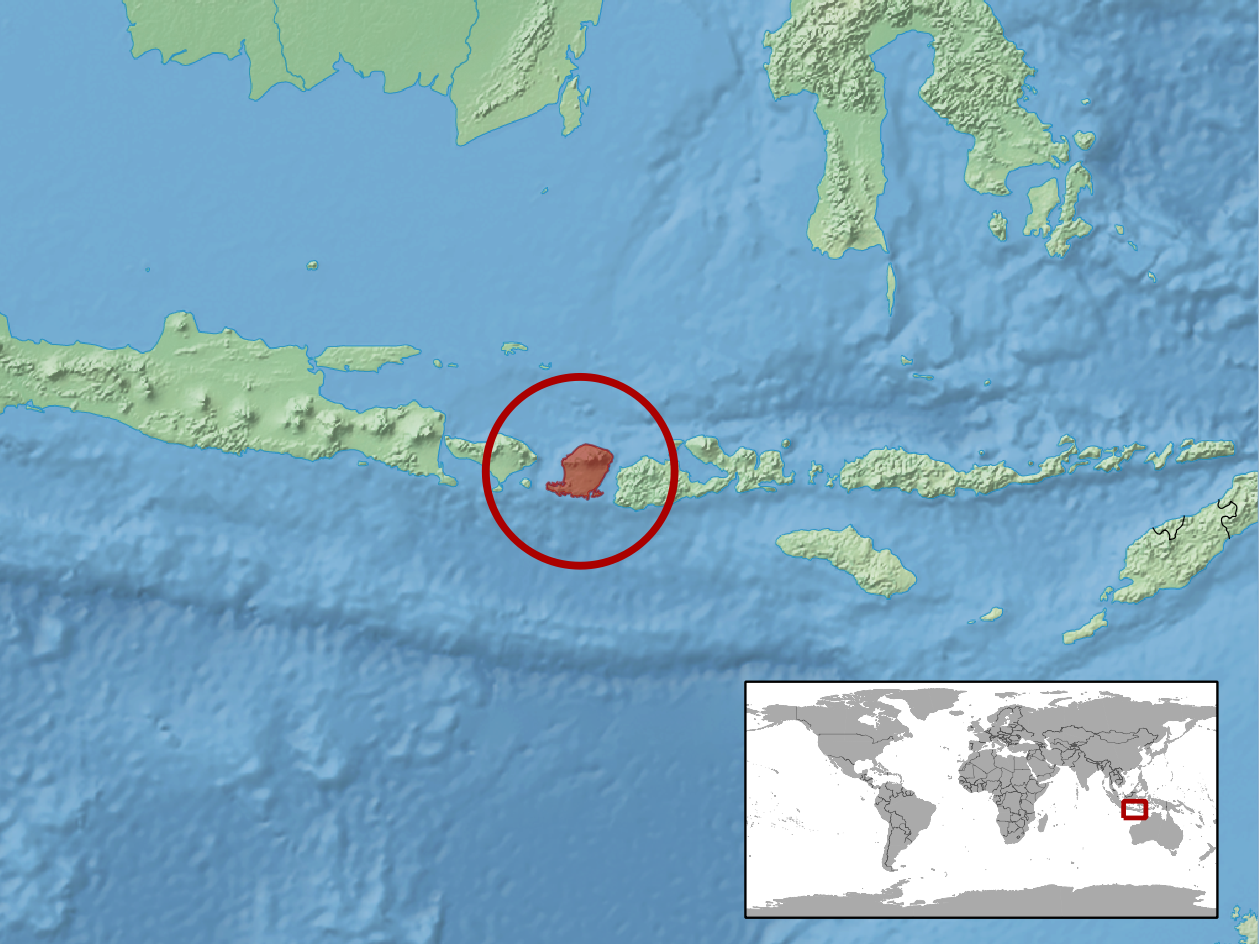

Synonyms
- Cnemaspis gordongekko Das, 1994; Cyrtodactylus gordongekkoi — Biswas, 2007

Species of lizard

Cyrtodactylus gordongekkoi is a species of gecko, a lizard in the family Gekkonidae. The species is endemic to Lombok in Indonesia.

== Etymology ==
The specific name, gordongekkoi, jokingly refers to Gordon Gekko, a character in the film Wall Street.

== Habitat ==
The preferred natural habitat of C. gordongekkoi is forest.

== Reproduction ==
C. gordongekkoi is oviparous.
