= Christopher Winter (artist) =

English contemporary artist

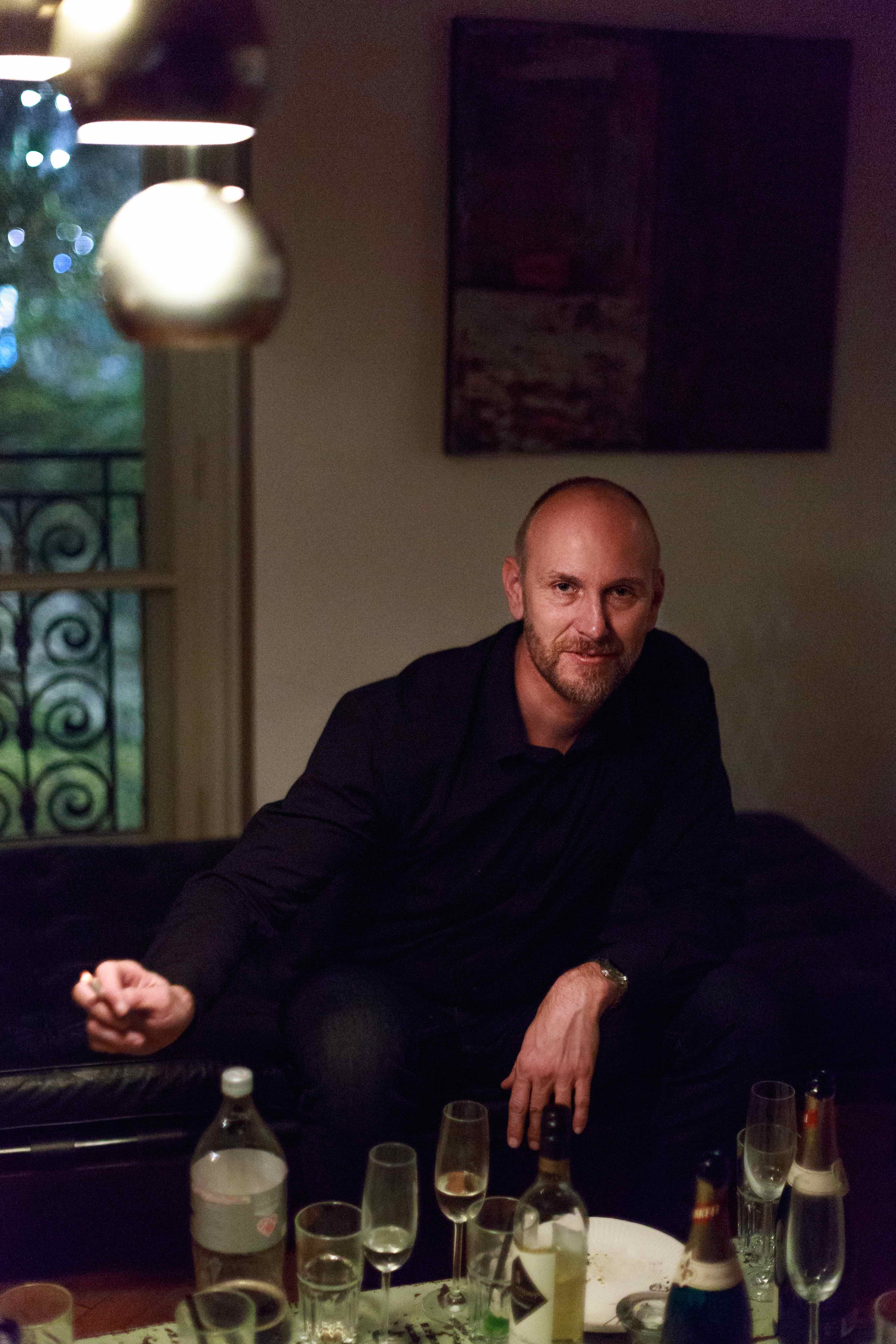
- Winter in 2014
- Born: 31 May 1968 (age 58); Kent, England
- Education: Hastings College of Arts; Camberwell College of Arts; Kunstakademie Düsseldorf
- Website: www.christopher-winter.com

Christopher Winter (born 31 May 1968) is an English contemporary artist. In addition to painting and drawing, both abstract and figurative, Winter also makes video and sculpture. His work interprets contemporary reality and reactions to modern life.

== Life and education ==
Winter was born in Kent, England. He studied at Hastings College of Arts, Camberwell College of Arts and the Kunstakademie Düsseldorf in Germany with Fritz Schwegler.

In the early 1990s, he was a member of the London art collective, BANK.

From October 1993 to June 1994, Winter was artist-in-residence for the city of Mannheim, Germany. In 2010, the Reiss Engelhorn Museum in Mannheim, featured a solo exhibition of his work titled "Wild Life”. The museum invited artists to exhibit who had received the award from the city of Mannheim under the slogan "Welcome Back", acknowledging their artistic work and its progress since the scholarship.

In 2015, Kerber Verlag published a large monograph of Winter's work to mark 20 years of painting in Germany titled "Dizzyland. 20 Years in Germany".

Since 2006, Winter has been working with gallery curator Asher Edelman in New York City, New York.

Winter lives and works in Berlin, Germany.

== Work ==
Winter's painting is influenced by literature, film and politics, and has been called "speculative realism". His work includes fictitious characters as well as those inspired by his personal life.

Winter creates series that deal with a specific issue. His series "Bavarian Postcards" shown in his solo exhibition “Bavarian Heaven” at the Wilhelm-Hack Museum (2002) are based on postcards from the Berchtesgaden area and its dark history. In particular motifs from Obersalzberg, Hitler's Berghof and the surrounding mountains are integrated into Winter's large-scale works on canvas.

His series of paintings "Virgin Forest" (2005) exhibited in New York at Salander O’Reilly Gallery (and years later at Frances Lehman Loeb Art Center at Vassar College) is based on the comparison of English and German fairy tales set deep in the woods.

In a review of his exhibition "Songs of Innocence" (2007), Jonathan Goodman said: "He catches his young characters at the moment when their curiosity loses its innocence and joins the experience of adults."

The novel Lord of the Flies by William Golding influences the series of Winter's work called Primeval. As in the novel, the children and adolescents in the paintings have gone wild and society has broken down. The Halloween theme alluded to in these paintings was developed further in Winter's "Spook-a-rama" series, an installation that opened on the night of Halloween at Edelman Arts in New York (2008). This event also featured a seance that attempted to summon the spirit of the medieval artist Hans Holbein the Younger." A selection of these works was shown at Lehr Zeitgenössiche Kunst in Cologne, Germany under the title Tales of Trust.

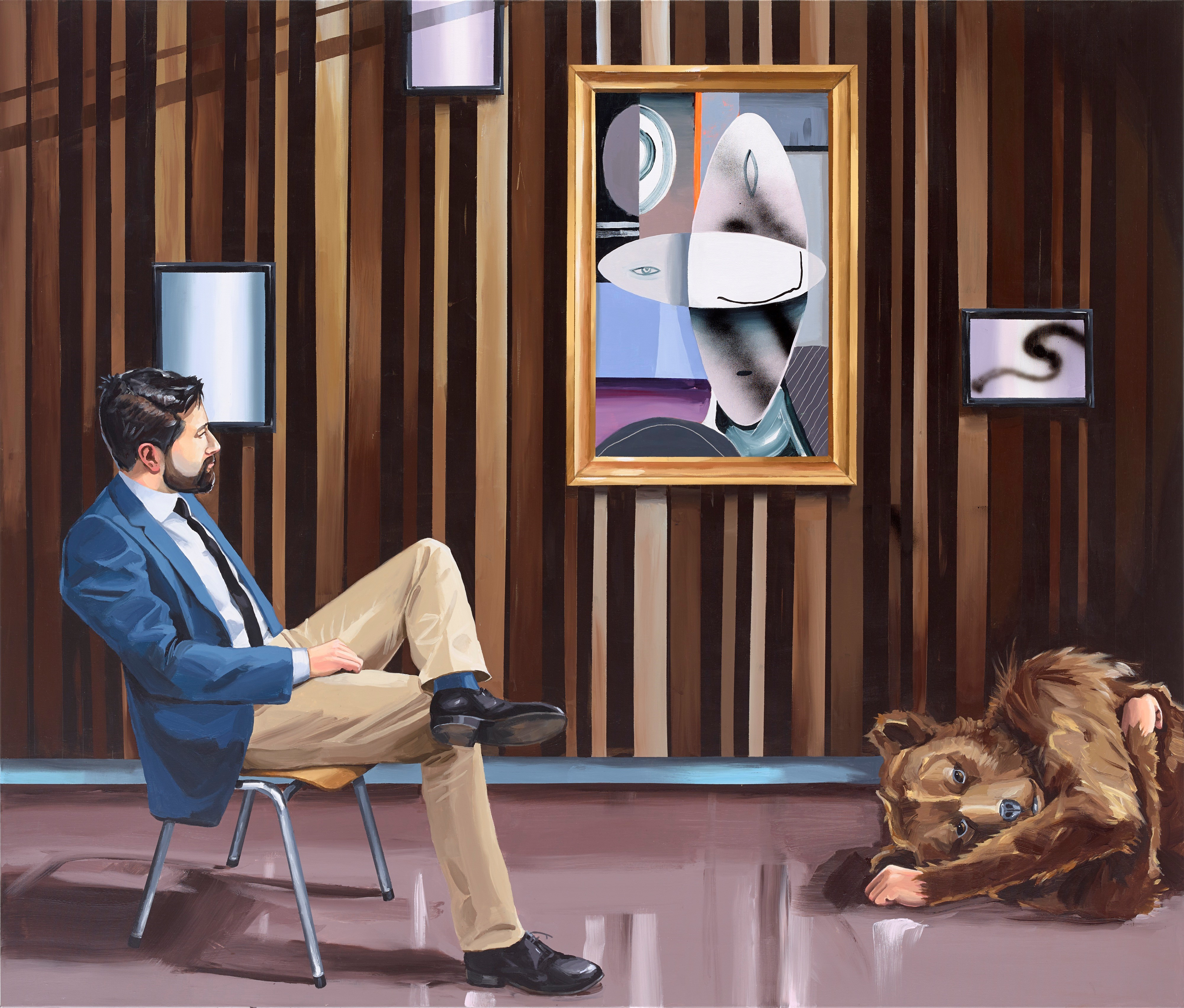
Space Time Reality painting by Christopher Winter

Winter's series "Weird Science" and "Unnatural History" deal with human longing to transcend the ordinary through magic.

In his series "Speculative Realism", Winter extends space and reality, combining the installation with figurative and abstract painting. The work is influenced by the novel 1Q84 by the Japanese writer Haruki Murakami and deals with a parallel world that is very close to ours. This series has been shown in Cologne and Berlin at Lehr Zeitgenössiche Kunst under the title "2Q13 Speculative Realism" and in New York at Garis & Hahn under the title "Virtual Being". In addition to his usual figurative approach to painting Winter includes in this series Abstraction and Cubism styles.

== Various projects ==
In 2007, Winter was the first of five artists chosen to exhibit in the project "DRIVE THRU Gallery" in Aschersleben, Germany, initiated by the Bauhaus Museum, Dessau and Internationale Bauausstellung. The exhibition series raised awareness of the urban renewal taking place in East Germany. In vacant lots huge reproductions were placed of paintings by Christopher Winter, closing the gaps between buildings creating an oversized gallery exhibition in a public space.

Pit Baumgartner, founder and producer of the music group De–Phazz, initiated a project setting Winter's paintings to music. Under the title "I'll show you something" ("Ich zeig dir was")it was accompanied by an audio book upon release in 2009. This followed his first collaboration with Baumgartner in 2008. The cover of that solo album by Baumgartner, entitled Tales of Trust, shows the painting is the "Supernatural" (2005) painting from the "Virgin Forest" series.

Winter was the founder and director of the exhibition series “KIK” (Peter Wilde co-directed KIK ONE and KIK TWO). This was a non-profit independent exhibition program launched in 2014 at Berlin's Kino International. KIK ONE had about 1,400 visitors. Artists such as Julian Rosefeldt; Jonathan Meese; Elmgreen & Dragset; Andy Hope 1930; Gary Hill; Jonas Burgert; Martin Eder; Daniele Buetti; Julien Charrière and Assume Vivid Astro Focus were exhibited. Winter curated and also invited two guest curators a year to create an exhibition for the program, which ended after KIK EIGHT in March 2016.

In September 2016, Winter curated “"A New Language" for the Contemporary Arts Festival ROOT 1066 in celebration of 950 years since the Norman Conquest. He presented an international group of 23 Berlin-based artists who explore language and cultural changes instigated by the invasion of 1066.

Winter has exhibited in international galleries, museums and institutions, including the Museum Ludwig, Cologne; Wilhelm-Hack Museum, Ludwigshafen; Victoria Miro Gallery, London; Galerie Gmurzynska, St. Moritz; Galerie Almine Rech, Paris; le Crédac, Centre d‘art d‘Ivry, Paris; Heidelberg Kunstverein, Heidelberg; Paul Kasmin Gallery, New York; Phillips de Pury, New York; Kunstverein Tiergarten, Berlin; Gasworks Gallery, London; Lothringer13, Munich; German Hygiene Museum, Dresden; Malkasten Künstlerverein, Düsseldorf; Frances Lehmen Loeb Art Center, New York; Bridport Art Centre, Bridport (UK); Städtisches Museum, Albstadt and Reiss Engelhorn Museum, Mannheim.

== Various collections ==
- Berlinische Galerie Museum, Museum for Modern Art, Photography and Architecture, Berlin, Germany
- Vassar College, The Frances Lehmen Loeb Art Center, New York
- Wilhelm-Hack-Museum, Ludwigshafen, Germany
- Julio Serrano Segovia Collection, and Fundación Amparo y Manuel (AMMA), Mexico-City

== Various literature ==
=== Monographs ===
- Bavarian Heaven, Wilhelm-Hack-Museum, Ludwigshafen, 2002 ISBN 3-934713-04-1
- Things to come, Basilika der Benediktinarbtei St, Bonifaz, München, 2004
- Virgin Forest, Edelman Arts/Salander O'Reilly, New York, 2006 ISBN 1-58821-141-X
- Songs of Innocence, Neuhoff Edelman Gallery, New York, 2007
- Spook-a-rama, Edelman Arts, New York, 2008
- Ich zeig dir was, Phazzadelic, Germany, ISBN 978-3-940978-01-1
- Weird Science, Lehr Zeitgenössische Kunst, Köln, 2011
- Unnatural History, Edelman Arts, New York, 2012
- 2Q13 Speculative Realism, Lehr Zeitgenössische Kunst, Köln, 2013
- Dizzyland. 20 Years in Germany, Lehr Zeitgenössische Kunst, Berlin, 2015 ISBN 978-3-7356-0085-1
- Circadian Rhythm, Christopher Winter, Berlin, 2017
- Archipelago of The Mind, Kerber Verlag, Bielefeld, 2021, ISBN 978-3-7356-0807-9
- Supernatura, ArtEX, Todi (Italy), 2023
- Super Nature, Karl Oskar Gallery, Berlin, 2024

== Solo exhibitions ==
2024	Super Nature	Karl Oskar Gallery	Berlin
2023	Archipelago of the Mind	Museum Heylshof	Worms
2023	Supernatura	Torculareum Museum	Todi (Italy)
2022	Travelling between then and now	Dirk Lehr Collection	Berlin
2021	Archipelago of the Mind	ZAK/Zentrum für aktuelle Kunst	Berlin
2020	Norwegian Wood	Dirk Lehr Collection	Berlin
2019	Libertine Island	Karl Oskar Gallery	Berlin
2017	Circadian Rhythm	Lehr Zeitgenössische Kunst	Berlin
2015	Virtual Being	Garis & Hahn	New York
2015	In Search of Lost Time	Lehr Zeitgenössische Kunst	Berlin
2015	Holy & Ghost	Katholische Kirche St. Eduard	Berlin
2014	Reflecting Realities	Mindy Solomon Gallery	Miami
2014	2Q14 Speculative Realism	Lehr Zeitgnössische Kunst	Berlin
2014	Telling Tales	Bridport Art Centre	Bridport
2013	2Q13 Speculative Realism	Lehr Zeitgenössische Kunst	Cologne
2012	Unnatural History	Edelman Arts	New York
2011	Weird Science	Lehr Zeitgenössische Kunst	Cologne
2011	Shooting Artists	La Pagode	Paris
2010	Wild Life	Reiss Engelhorn Museum	Mannheim
2010	Evolution	Edelman Arts	New York
2010	Black Ghosts	Kunstverein Tiergarten	Berlin
2010	Pablo Picasso-Zwischen Arena und Arkadien (Séance Performance from Christopher Winter)	Städtisches Museum	Albstadt
2009	Tales of Trust	Lehr Zeitgnössische Kunst	Cologne
2009	Postcards from The Edge	Künstlerverein Malkasten	Düsseldorf
2008	Spook-a-rama	Edelman Arts	New York
2008	Big Small Works	Edelman Arts	New York
2007	Hitzefrei	Drive Thru Gallery (in association with the Bauhaus Museum, Dessau and the IBA Internationale Bauausstellung)	Aschersleben
2007	Songs of Innocence	Neuhoff Edelman Gallery	New York
2006	Virgin Forest	Salander O‘Reilly - Edelman Arts	New York
2005	If things get real	Galerie Jaspers	Munich
2004	Passion	Kunst-Station Sankt Peter	Cologne
2004	Things to Come	Basilika von St. Bonifaz	Munich
2003	Innocent Spaces	Artax	Düsseldorf
2003	Heimat	Forum in Dominikanerkloster	Frankfurt
2002	Bavarian Heaven	Wilhelm-Hack Museum	Ludwigshafen
2002	Winterwonderland	Oberwelt	Stuttgart
2001	Amazing Stories	Enders Projects	Frankfurt
2000	Holiday	Galerie Neue Kunst	Mannheim
1999	Kindergarten	Enders Projects	Frankfurt
1999	Bavarian Bus Tour Massacre	Onomato Video Archiv	Düsseldorf
1999	Alien Sex Invaders	Raum X	Düsseldorf
1995	Witness	Academia	Mannheim
1994	Ice Houses	Galerie Säule	Mannheim
1993	Illuminations	Reiss Engelhorn Museum	Mannheim
