= Chris Winter =

Chris Winter may refer to:

- W. Christopher Winter (born 1972), sleep scientist, author
- Chris Winter (athlete) (born 1986), Canadian 3,000 meter steeplechase runner
- Chris Winter (television presenter) (born 1989), Australian television presenter for Network Ten
- Chris Winter (American football) American college football coach
