= Cathy McClure =

American visual artist

Cathy McClure is a Seattle-based American visual artist working in a metalsmithing tradition and known for her kinetic sculptures and zoetrope installations. Her work blurs the lines between art and craft and often features re-engineered mechanical toys, motors, sound and strobe lighting.

== Early life and education ==
McClure was born in Abilene, Texas and raised in Jonesboro, Arkansas. After high school, she studied metalworking at Texas Tech University under Robly Glover. She received her BFA from Texas Tech in 1995. Following her undergraduate studies, she relocated to Seattle to attend the University of Washington. She graduated from their MFA program in 1997.

Although her background is in metalsmithing, she was described by critic Bruce Metcalf as "dissatisfied with the field's conventional boundaries". She credits her teachers, including Robly Glover and Akio Takamori, for showing her the value of working outside her primary discipline of metalsmithing.

== Awards ==
In 1997, McClure was awarded the 19th annual Betty Bowen Award Grand Prize from the Seattle Art Museum. She was a 2018 Artist In Residence at Pilchuck Glass School, and was awarded an AIR at the Vashon Residency in 2021.

== Exhibitions ==
=== Early zoetropic installations ===
In 1999, for her first museum solo exhibition, McClure produced a three-part zoetropic installation, 'New Kinetic Sculpture', for the exhibition 'Team Works' at San Francisco's Yerba Buena Center for the Arts. In one part of the installation, she arranged her silver, copper, brass, and steel abstracted human figures on spinning metal disks which were lit by strobe lights. These figures were described by art critic David Bonetti as "miniature grandchildren of Bauhaus master Oskar Schlemmer's mechano-morphic sculptures." Her theatrical scene was enhanced by raucous carnival music, creating what Bonetti described as a "visual and aural three-ring circus that scares and delights equally."

Another of her zoetropic installations, 'People Doing Things, Shiny Objects, Great Color, Occasional Music', was included in the Bellevue Arts Museum's Pacific Northwest Annual in 2000. Writing for The Stranger, Emily Hall described its centerpiece was "a spinning mirrored object around which little figures cartwheel and flip and have televisions dropped on their heads, all intensified by colored lights and strobes." The installation's ambiance was furthered by "old-time theater seats, red velvet curtains, and vaudeville music." Her submission was awarded Best in Show.

=== 2000-09 ===
==== Bots ====
In her 2007 exhibition 'Menagerie' at Neuhoff Edelman Gallery, New York, McClure introduced her signature 'Bots' to her carnivalesque zoetropic installation, '3 Ring Circus'. She created her 'Bots' by deconstructing commercially available plush toys - mechanical elephants, hippos, roosters and other animals. She removed the stuffing from the toys, reconfigured their mechanical components, cast them in metal, and installed them on pedestals. Village Voice critic R.C. Baker noted, "The installation of three zoetropes featured ear-flapping, trunk-waving elephants slowly circling stainless-steel Ferris wheels and merry-go-rounds—the flashing strobe lights and minor-key music leavened big-eyed cuteness with glitzy dystopia."

Mass-produced plush mechanical toys also served as the inspiration and original form for the kinetic sculptures McClure included in 'Remains', her exhibition at New York's Moss Gallery in 2009. Her 'half-whimsical, half-disturbing animals' stripped of their coats and stuffing were cast in bronze, their inner mechanisms intact but exposed, she altered the toys' sound and movement controls.

Her 'Bots' sculptures reveal her fascination with the hidden, inner-workings of mechanical toys meant to be appreciated for their outsides. She remarked in an interview with the Seattle Times, "I was really interested in what I felt that was underneath," she said. "It's like uncovering an object that wasn't intended to be seen in the first place, that has a beautiful design." The sculptures' metal finishes make evident McClure's background in and appreciation for metalsmithing processes.

In a lecture given at Rhode Island School of Design in 2018, Murray Moss discussed McClure's 'Bots' noting, "Through metamorphosis they seem to have aged, even wizened…Their new bronze bodies are reductive, sleek, no longer toys concerned with pleasing the viewer, they are robotic creatures of [McClure's] own vision."

=== 2010-19 ===
In 2011, Washington's Bellevue Arts Museum organized a solo exhibition of McClure's work. Titled 'Midway', a reference to the traveling carnivals she attended as a child, it included music, whirling lights, futuristic, mechanized toys, a 10' Ferris wheel, and working carousel. Her 'Bots' featured in the exhibition included mechanical 'Elmo' and 'Mickey Mouse' toys "stripped of their commercial identities" and reconfigured by the artist to engage in repetitive motions, which "conjure dreamy cinematic operations and allude to a modern life characterized by escapism, frenzy and consumption." Curator Nora Atkinson remarked, "Midway evokes a fusion of adult and childhood fantasy with somber undertones as though the artist's creatures have run too long unchecked. It speaks of the coming and going of people/fads/phases, of displacement and discontentedness in the modern world, and of being lost in between."

For 'Mickey Hardwired', her 2013 exhibition at Moss Bureau, New York, the artist gathered and arranged an army of mechanical Mickey Mouse toys from which the recognizable, soft outer layer and inner voice mechanisms had been eliminated by the artist. Rewired by McClure to move initially in near-perfect unison, the skeletal Mickeys eventually collide with one another, creating a scene which devolves into whirring, ratcheting, chaos. She also presented her mechanical Mickey Mouse forms in an exhibition at Method Gallery, Seattle.

McClure sources the majority of the toys she uses for her sculptures from thrift stores, which has made her acutely aware of the abundance of cast-off and discarded products which may eventually end up in landfills. The artist's sculptures, videos, and installations highlight this "societal penchant for over-consumption and over-production." In a review published in 'Vanguard Seattle', T.s. Flock writes of McClure's 'Bots', "It's hard to believe that we live in the best of all possible worlds when there is demand for cheap thrills whose plastic corpses will be polluting the oceans long after we're dead. That's not the future we were promised, and these bots are part of the lie. McClure's work reminds us that we are still being duped through with an uncanny tension between sentimentality and waste."

In her work, McClure also considers the discrepancy between America's idealized dream of a technology-filled future and the reality of our increasingly digital lives. For the artist's 2017 solo exhibition, 'Dispossessed' held at the Center on Contemporary Art, she sourced used mechanical toys and covered some in gold-leaf, to bring a new attention and value to the toys' existence at a time when there is an evident shift away from physical play toward digital forms of engagement and stimuli occurring. For McClure, the tentative status of toys in the digital era is a metaphor for our own uncertain future.

=== 2020 - current ===
In 2020 McClure displayed her installation 'Re-Imagineering' at the Louise Hopkins Underwood Center for the Arts, and in 2021 at the Texas Tech University, School of Art Studio + Folio Gallery. These exhibitions included the fourth and fifth incarnations of McClure's 'Mickey Hardwired' installation.

== Public art ==
'A Place in the Woods', McClure's site-specific Douglas Fir perforated panels designed in collaboration with LMN architects and HLB lighting design was unveiled as a permanent installation in the entryway of the newly constructed Seattle Convention Center Summit Building on January 25, 2023. The light and shadow effect cast by the chandelier is created by forty-five strategically placed perforated wooden panels - the designs of the panels are modeled after the leaves, bark and roots of 13 Pacific Northwest native trees as seen through a microscope. The artwork was conceived by the artist to evoke the effect of sun dappling through a tree canopy.

== Personal life ==
Cathy McClure lives and works in Seattle, Washington.
