= W. Christopher Winter =

American sleep researcher (born 1972)

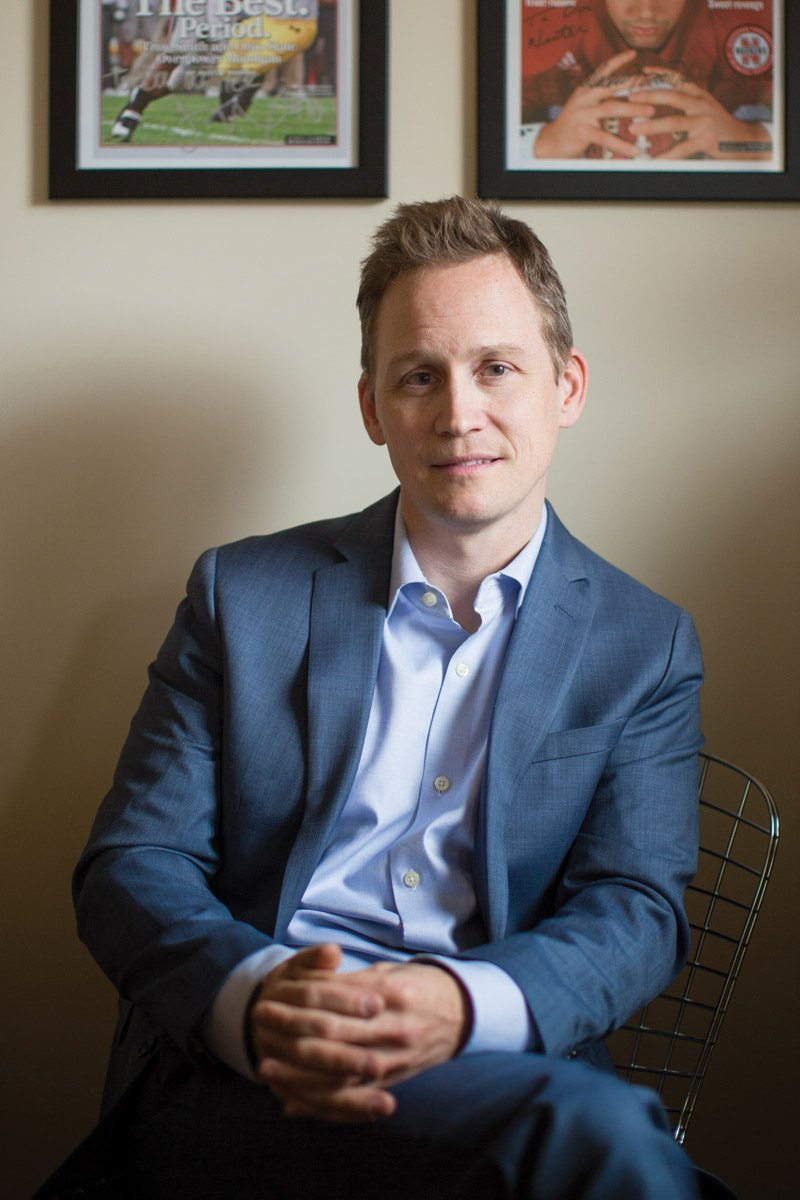
- Winter, c. 2015
- Born: December 27, 1972 (age 53); Roanoke, Virginia, United States
- Education: University of Virginia; Emory University School of Medicine; University of North Carolina School of Medicine
- Scientific career
- Workplaces: Charlottesville Neurology and Sleep Medicine; University of Virginia Department of Neurology
- Website: www.wchriswinter.com

William Christopher Winter (born December 27, 1972) is an American sleep researcher, neurologist, author, and authority regarding sleep and athletic performance. A 2010 article in Trail Runner Magazine described Winter as "the leading expert in the field of sleep disruption, in athletes and issues related to travel." He is credited with coining the term circadian advantage after studying the effects of travel on Major League Baseball teams. He studied the effect of sleep timing preference on Major League Baseball pitcher performance, and hitting performance. In 2013, his research linked the sleepiness of Major League Baseball players to a reduced career longevity. This work led to research into sleepiness as a predictor of NFL Draft value in which the sleep of 560 Atlantic Coast Conference (ACC) football players and their eventual draft success was studied.

== Career ==
To date, he has advised numerous professional athletic organizations, most notably the San Francisco Giants who publicly commented on his role with their club in 2012 and 2014. It has been documented that he has also worked with the Cleveland Guardians, Oklahoma City Thunder, New York Rangers and the Los Angeles Dodgers with this latter reference referring to Winter's work with athletic sleep to be the "Best Secret Weapon [in Sports]." More recently, Winter's work was linked to the Philadelphia Phillies in the 2022 World Series. Winter, described as "sleep whisperer" is referenced repeatedly by Arianna Huffington in her 2016 book The Sleep Revolution: Transforming Your Life, One Night at a Time.

Winter's debut book, The Sleep Solution: Why Your Sleep is Broken and How to Fix It, was released by Penguin Random House on April 4, 2017. Winter announced the upcoming publication of his second book, The Rested Child: Why Your Tired, Wired, or Irritable Child May Have a Sleep Disorder--and How to Help. The book was released by Penguin Random House August 17, 2021. Winter also hosts a podcast entitled Sleep Unplugged.

== The Sleep Solution ==
The Sleep Solution: Why Your Sleep Is Broken and How To Fix It
- Author: W. Christopher Winter, MD
- Language: English
- Genre: Science book
- Published: 4 April 2017, Penguin Random House
- Pages: 262
- ISBN: 978-0-399-58360-5

The Sleep Solution: Why Your Sleep Is Broken and How To Fix It is a science book about sleep by neurologist W. Christopher Winter, who specializes in sleep and performance.

The book was released on April 4, 2017, to favorable reviews. A review in Refinery 29 stated, "Dr. Winter's first book, The Sleep Solution: Why Your Sleep Is Broken And How To Fix It, is already being hailed as a "solution" to insomnia. It's a no-nonsense, colloquial approach to sleep difficulties that aims to change the narrative around sleep in order to make it more manageable." Kirkus Reviews wrote, "The rare book that may help sufferers of poor sleep improve their quality of rest simply by elucidating the context of good sleep and offering the right techniques to achieve it." Publishers Weekly wrote, "As a neurologist specializing in sleep issues, Winter certainly has good credentials to back up his promise to readers that they'll finish his book with a newfound sense of what it means to have healthy sleep." In November 2018, NY Magazine named the book one of the top 7 books for understanding sleep and the best book for insomnia. The book received favorable international press both in Ireland and the Netherlands

Time published an excerpt from the book on April 26, 2017.

== Selected publications ==
- Jaffee, MS; Winter, WC (2015). "Sleep disturbances in athletic concussion". Brain Injury. 29 (2): 221–7. doi:10.3109/02699052.2014.983978. PMID 25587746. S2CID 28966439.
- Winter, WC; Hammond, WR; Green, NH; Zhang, Z; Bliwise, DL (2009). "Measuring circadian advantage in Major League Baseball: a 10-year retrospective study". International Journal of Sports Physiology and Performance. 4 (3): 394–401. doi:10.1123/ijspp.4.3.394. PMID 19953826.
- Morgan, JC; Winter, WC; Wooten, GF (2004). "Amphetamine-induced chorea in attention deficit-hyperactivity disorder". Movement Disorders. 19 (7): 840–842. doi:10.1002/mds.20081. PMID 15254949.
- Winter, WC; Juel, VC (2003). "Hypoglossal neuropathy in hereditary neuropathy with liability to pressure palsy". Neurology. 61 (8): 1154–1155. doi:10.1212/01.wnl.0000086808.56096.da. PMID 14581692. S2CID 27359339.
- Ranta, A; Winter, WC; Login, IS (2003). "Extracranial hypoglossal schwannoma". Neurology. 60 (12): E11. doi:10.1212/01.WNL.0000060184.63911.B0. PMID 12821768.
- Qureshi, AI; Winter, WC; Bliwise, DL (1999). "Sleep fragmentation and morning cerebrovasomotor reactivity to hypercapnia". American Journal of Respiratory and Critical Care Medicine. 160 (4): 1244–1247. doi:10.1164/ajrccm.160.4.9810111. PMID 10508814.
- Lonergan, RP; Ware, JC; Atkinson, RL; Winter, WC; Suratt, PM (1998). "Sleep apnea in obese miniature pigs". Journal of Applied Physiology. 84 (2): 531–536. doi:10.1152/jappl.1998.84.2.531. PMID 9475862.
- Winter, WC; Gampper, T; Gay, SB; Suratt, PM (1997). "Lateral pharyngeal fat pad pressure during breathing in anesthetized pigs". Journal of Applied Physiology. 83 (3): 688–694. doi:10.1152/jappl.1997.83.3.688. PMID 9292450.
- Winter, WC; Gampper, T; Gay, SB; Suratt, PM (1996). "Lateral pharyngeal fat pad pressure during breathing". Sleep. 19 (10): 178–179. doi:10.1093/sleep/19.suppl_10.178. PMID 9085504.
- Winter, WC; Gampper, T; Gay, SB; Suratt, PM (1995). "Enlargement of the lateral pharyngeal fat pad space in pigs increases upper airway resistance". Journal of Applied Physiology. 79 (3): 726–731. doi:10.1152/jappl.1995.79.3.726. PMID 8567510.
