= Galerie Gmurzynska =

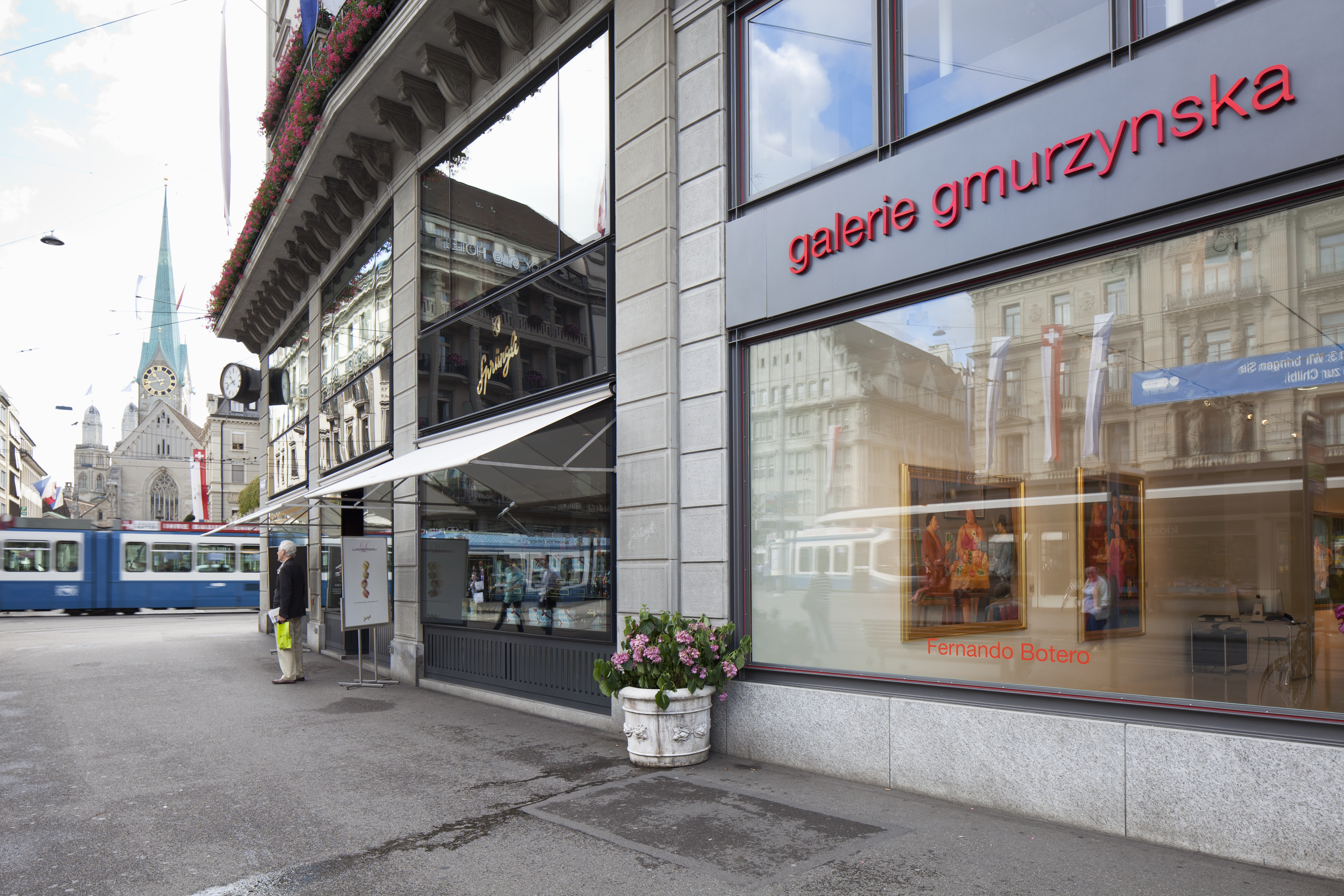
- Formation: 1965
- Founder: Antonina Gmurzynska
- Founded at: Cologne, Germany
- Purpose: Art gallery
- Headquarters: Zürich, Switzerland
- Location(s): Zürich, Switzerland Zug, Switzerland St. Moritz, Switzerland
- Coordinates: 47.369°N 8.538°E
- Owners: Krystyna Gmurzynska; Mathias Rastorfer
- Website: gmurzynska.com

Galerie Gmurzynska is a commercial art gallery based in Zurich, Switzerland, specializing in modern and contemporary art and work by the Russian avant-garde. It became a popular venue for international collectors seeking Russian art that was banned by the Soviet regime, and, according to Artnet, became the "go-to place for Russian art for international collectors".

The gallery buys and sells mostly works by modern and contemporary artists. It also sells pieces at art fairs by artists such as Pablo Picasso, Kurt Schwitters, Fernand Léger, Lyonel Feininger, Robert and Sonia Delaunay, Stallone and Fernando Botero. The gallery works with the estates of Yves Klein, Wifredo Lam, Louise Nevelson, and Robert Indiana among others. It also arranged for an exhibition of Sylvester Stallone at the Museum of Modern Art in Nice in 2015 and hosts the artwork of fashion designer Karl Lagerfeld and the architect Richard Meier.

The gallery also publishes books and catalogues for its exhibitions.

== Controversies ==
=== Edelman v Gmurzynska insurance dispute ===
Between 2007 and 2009, the gallery was involved in a dispute with dealer Asher B. Edelman, who had loaned a work to Gmurzynska that was returned damaged. Gmurzynska was accused of ignoring the claim. In 2009, a U.S. district court judge awarded Edelman a default judgment of $765,000 to which Gmurzynska failed to respond, leading four of the Gmurzynska's paintings to be seized at the Miami Beach Art Fair and held for two days until the gallery paid the judgment. Edelman was awarded an additional $250,000 for what the judge described as the gallery's "wilful conduct" in the matter, i.e. their failure to respond to the lawsuit. Gmurzynska disputed any wrongdoing, stating that "the gallery never received any notice that Mr. Edelman had applied for a default judgment".
