= Wall Street (1987 film) =

Film by Oliver Stone

- Theatrical release poster
- Directed by: Oliver Stone
- Written by: Oliver Stone; Stanley Weiser
- Produced by: Edward R. Pressman
- Starring: Michael Douglas; Charlie Sheen; Daryl Hannah; Martin Sheen; Hal Holbrook; Terence Stamp
- Cinematography: Robert Richardson
- Edited by: Claire Simpson
- Music by: Stewart Copeland
- Production companies: American Entertainment Partners; Amercent Films
- Distributed by: 20th Century Fox
- Release date: December 11, 1987
- Running time: 126 minutes
- Country: United States
- Language: English
- Budget: $16.5 million
- Box office: $43.8 million

Wall Street is a 1987 American crime drama film directed and co-written by Oliver Stone, which stars Michael Douglas, Charlie Sheen, Daryl Hannah, and Martin Sheen. The film tells the story of Bud Fox (C. Sheen), a young stockbroker who becomes involved with Gordon Gekko (Douglas), a wealthy, unscrupulous corporate raider.

Stone made the film as a tribute to his father, Lou Stone, a stockbroker during the Great Depression. The character of Gekko is said to be a composite of several people, including Dennis Levine, Ivan Boesky, Carl Icahn, Asher Edelman, Michael Milken and Stone himself. The character of Sir Lawrence Wildman, meanwhile, was modelled on British financier and corporate raider Sir James Goldsmith. Originally, the studio wanted Warren Beatty to play Gekko, but he was not interested; Stone, meanwhile, wanted Richard Gere, but Gere passed on the role.

Wall Street was released by 20th Century Fox on December 11, 1987. The film was well received among major film critics. Douglas won the Academy Award for Best Actor, and the film has come to be seen as the archetypal portrayal of 1980s excess, with Douglas' character declaring that "greed, for lack of a better word, is good." It has also proven influential in inspiring people to work on Wall Street, with Sheen, Douglas, and Stone commenting over the years how people still approach them and say that they became stockbrokers because of their respective characters in the film.

Stone and Douglas reunited for a sequel titled Wall Street: Money Never Sleeps, which was released theatrically on September 24, 2010.

== Plot ==
In 1985, Bud Fox is a junior stockbroker at Jackson Steinem & Co. in New York City. He wants to work with his hero, Gordon Gekko, a legendary Wall Street player. After weeks of calling Gekko's, Bud visits him on his birthday with a box of contraband Cuban cigars. Admiring his persistence, Gekko finally grants Bud an interview but is unimpressed by the stocks he pitches. Bud desperately provides him with inside information about Bluestar Airlines learned from his father Carl, leader of Bluestar's maintenance workers' union. Bud leaves dejected by the lukewarm response, but Gekko orders Bluestar stock and becomes one of Bud's clients. After the tip pays off with a substantial return, Gekko gives Bud more capital to manage. Bud's stock choices, made from honest research and advice from respected senior broker Lou Mannheim, lose money. Gekko tells Bud to spy on British investor Sir Lawrence Wildman, and when it seems Wildman is bidding for Anacott Steel, Gekko buys a large block of shares. Wildman is forced to buy back from him at a high price to complete the takeover.

Bud becomes wealthy, moves into a penthouse on Manhattan's East Side and begins dating Darien Taylor, an interior decorator who also happens to be Gekko's art consultant and ex-mistress. Bud is promoted for the large commissions he brings in and is given an office with a view. He continues to exploit inside information and use friends as straw buyers to generate additional income for himself and Gekko. Unknown to Bud, several of his trades attract the attention of the U.S. Securities and Exchange Commission (SEC).

Bud pitches a new idea to Gekko: buy Bluestar Airlines and expand the company, with Bud as president, using savings achieved by union concessions and the overfunded pension. Even though Bud is unable to persuade his father to support him and Gekko, he is able to get the unions to push for the deal. Soon afterward, Bud learns that Gekko plans to dissolve the company and sell off Bluestar's assets to access cash from the company's pension plan, leaving Carl and the entire Bluestar staff unemployed. Although this would leave Bud a very rich man, he is angered by Gekko's deceit and wracked with guilt for being an accessory to Bluestar's impending destruction, especially after his father suffers a heart attack. Bud resolves to disrupt Gekko's plans and breaks up with Darien when she refuses to go against Gekko, her former lover.

Bud and the union presidents secretly meet with Wildman and arrange for him to buy the stock and a controlling interest in Bluestar, at a significant discount, on the condition that he saves the company. Bud then devises a plan to leak news of Gekko's takeover to drive up the price. This forces Gekko to buy the stock at a higher price, as he tries to secure a controlling interest. Bud then convinces the unions to pull their support, ending any prospect of Gekko completing the takeover, and causing the price to plummet. This forces Gekko to offload his stock at a considerable loss. When Gekko learns on the evening news that Wildman is buying Bluestar, he realizes Bud has engineered the entire scheme. Bud triumphantly returns to work at Jackson Steinem the following day, only to be arrested by the SEC, who had been tracking Bud's insider trading.

Later, Bud confronts Gekko in Central Park. Gekko punches Bud several times, berating him for his role with Bluestar, and accuses him of ingratitude for several of their illicit trades. Later, it is revealed that Bud was wearing a wire to record his encounter with Gekko for the authorities, who suggest he may get a lighter sentence in exchange for providing evidence against Gekko. Later, Bud's parents drive him down FDR Drive towards the New York County Courthouse, telling Bud he "did the right thing" by cooperating with the government and paying back his illicit earnings, and urging him to accept Wildman's offer of a job at Bluestar once he has completed his prison sentence. After suggesting Bud "create, instead of living off the buying and selling of others", Carl drops Bud off at the courthouse, where he ascends the steps, ready to face justice for his crimes.

== Cast ==
- Michael Douglas as Gordon Gekko
- Charlie Sheen as Bud Fox
- Daryl Hannah as Darien Taylor
- Martin Sheen as Carl Fox
- John C. McGinley as Marvin
- Terence Stamp as Sir Larry Wildman
- James Karen as Harry Lynch
- Hal Holbrook as Lou Mannheim
- Sean Young as Kate Gekko
- James Spader as Roger Barnes
- Saul Rubinek as Harold Salt
- John Capodice as Dominick
- Franklin Cover as Dan
- Sylvia Miles as Dolores the Realtor
- Millie Perkins as Mrs. Fox
- Josh Mostel as Ollie
- Paul Guilfoyle as Stone Livingstone
- Tamara Tunie as Carolyn
- Leslie Lyles as Natalie
- Adelle Lutz as Janet
- Richard Dysart as Cromwell
- Andrea Thompson as a hooker
- Michael O'Donoghue as Reporter

== Production ==
=== Development ===
After the success of Platoon (1986), Oliver Stone wanted film school friend and Los Angeles screenwriter Stanley Weiser to research and write a screenplay about quiz show scandals in the 1950s. During a story conference, Stone suggested making a film about Wall Street instead. Stone pitched the premise of two investment partners getting involved in questionable financial dealings, using each other, and they are tailed by a prosecutor as in Crime and Punishment. Stone had been thinking about this kind of a film as early as 1981 and was inspired by his father, Lou Stone, a broker during the Great Depression at Hayden Stone.

Stone knew a New York businessman who was making millions and working long days putting together deals all over the world. This man started making mistakes that cost him everything. Stone remembers that the "story frames what happens in my movie, which is basically a The Pilgrim's Progress of a boy who is seduced and corrupted by the allure of easy money. And in the third act, he sets out to redeem himself". Stone asked Weiser to read Crime and Punishment, but Weiser found that its story did not mix well with their own. Stone then asked Weiser to read The Great Gatsby for material that they could use, but it was not the right fit either. Weiser had no prior knowledge of the financial world and immersed himself in researching the world of stock trading, junk bonds, and corporate takeovers. He and Stone spent three weeks visiting brokerage houses and interviewing investors.

=== Screenplay ===
Weiser wrote the first draft, initially called Greed, with Stone writing another draft. Originally, Charlie Sheen's character was a young Jewish broker named Freddie Goldsmith, but Stone changed the name to Bud Fox to avoid the stereotype that Wall Street was controlled by Jews. Reportedly, Gordon Gekko is said to be a composite of several people: Wall Street broker Owen Morrisey, an old friend of Stone's who was involved in a $20 million insider trading scandal in 1985, Dennis Levine, Ivan Boesky, corporate raider Carl Icahn, investor and art collector Asher Edelman, agent Michael Ovitz and Stone himself. For example, Stone told Newsweek that the "Greed, for lack of a better word, is good" line was based on a speech by Boesky where he said, "Greed is right".

According to Edward R. Pressman, producer of the film, "Originally, there was no one individual who Gekko was modeled on", he adds, "But Gekko was partly Milken". Also, Pressman has said that the character of Sir Larry Wildman was modeled on James Goldsmith, the Anglo-French billionaire and corporate-raider.

According to Weiser, Gekko's style of speaking was inspired by Stone. "When I was writing some of the dialogue I would listen to Oliver on the phone and sometimes he talks very rapid-fire, the way Gordon Gekko does". Stone cites as influences on his approach to business, the novels of Upton Sinclair, Sinclair Lewis and Victor Hugo, and the films of Paddy Chayefsky because they were able to make a complicated subject clear to the audience. Stone set the film in 1985 because insider trading scandals culminated in 1985 and 1986. This led to anachronisms in the script, including a reference to the Space Shuttle Challenger disaster, which had not yet occurred.

=== Casting ===
Stone met with Tom Cruise about playing Bud Fox, but Stone had already committed to Charlie Sheen for the role. Matthew Modine turned down the role of Bud Fox. Stone liked the "stiffness" of Sheen's acting style and used it to convey Bud's naivete. Michael Douglas had just come off heroic roles like the one in Romancing the Stone and was looking for something dark and edgy. The studio wanted Warren Beatty to play Gekko, but he was not interested. Stone initially wanted Richard Gere but Gere passed, so Stone went with Douglas despite having been advised by others in Hollywood not to cast him. Stone remembers, "I was warned by everyone in Hollywood that Michael couldn't act, that he was a producer more than an actor and would spend all his time in his trailer on the phone". Nevertheless, Stone found out that "when he's acting he gives it his all". Stone said that he saw "that villain quality" in Douglas and always thought he was a smart businessman. Douglas remembers that when he first read the screenplay, "I thought it was a great part. It was a long script, and there were some incredibly long and intense monologues to open with. I'd never seen a screenplay where there were two or three pages of single-spaced type for a monologue. I thought, whoa! I mean, it was unbelievable". For research, he read profiles of corporate raiders T. Boone Pickens and Carl Icahn.

Stone gave Charlie Sheen the choice of Jack Lemmon or Martin Sheen to play his father in the film Carl, and Sheen picked Martin Sheen, his own father. The elder Sheen related to the moral sense of his character. Stone cast Daryl Hannah as Bud Fox's materialistic girlfriend Darien Taylor, but felt that she was never happy with the role and did not know why she accepted it. He tried to explain the character to Hannah repeatedly, and thought that the materialism of the character conflicted with Hannah's idealism. Stone said later that he was aware early on that she was not right for the part. "Daryl Hannah was not happy doing the role and I should have let her go. All my crew wanted to get rid of her after one day of shooting. My pride was such that I kept saying I was going to make it work". Stone also had difficulties with Sean Young, who made her opinions known that Hannah should be fired and that she should play that role instead. Young would show up to the set late and unprepared. She did not get along with Charlie Sheen, which caused further friction on the set. In retrospect, Stone felt that Young was right and he should have swapped Hannah's role with hers. Stone admits that he had "some problems" with Young, but was not willing to confirm or deny rumors that she walked off with all of her costumes when she completed filming.

=== Principal photography ===
Stone wanted to shoot the film in New York City and that required a budget of at least $15 million, a moderate shooting budget by 1980s standards. The studio that backed Platoon felt that it was too risky a project to bankroll and passed. Stone and producer Edward R. Pressman took it to 20th Century Fox and filming began in April 1987 and ended on July 4 of the same year. Parts of the film were shot in Snowbird, Utah. According to Stone, he was "making a movie about sharks, about feeding frenzies. Bob [director of photography Robert Richardson] and I wanted the camera to become a predator. There is no let-up until you get to the fixed world of Charlie's father, where the stationary camera gives you a sense of immutable values". The director saw [Wall Street] as a battle zone and "filmed it as such" including shooting conversations like physical confrontations, and in ensemble shots had the camera circle the actors "in a way that makes you feel you're in a pool with sharks".

Jeffrey "Mad Dog" Beck, a star investment banker at the time with Drexel Burnham Lambert, was one of the film's technical advisers and has a cameo appearance in the film as the man speaking at the meeting discussing the breakup of Bluestar. Kenneth Lipper, investment banker and former deputy mayor of New York for Finance and Economic Development, was also hired as chief technical adviser. At first, he turned Stone down because he felt that the film would be a one-sided attack. Stone asked him to reconsider and Lipper read the script responding with a 13-page critique. For example, he argued that it was unrealistic to have all the characters be "morally bankrupt". Lipper advised Stone on the kind of computers used on the trading floor, the accurate proportion of women at a business meeting, and the kinds of extras that should be seated at the annual shareholders' meeting where Gekko delivers his "Greed is good" speech. Stone agreed with Lipper's criticism and asked him to rewrite the script. Lipper brought a balance to the film and this helped Stone get permission to shoot on the floor of the New York Stock Exchange during trading hours. Lipper and Stone disagreed over the character of Lou Mannheim (Hal Holbrook). Stone shot a scene showing the honest Mannheim giving in to insider trading, but Lipper argued that audiences might conclude that everyone on Wall Street is corrupt and insisted that the film needed an unimpeachable character. Stone cut the scene.

Stone also consulted with Carl Icahn, Asher Edelman, convicted inside trader David Brown, several government prosecutors and Wall Street investment bankers. In addition, traders were brought in to coach actors on the set on how to hold phones, write out tickets, and talk to clients. Stone asked Lipper to design a six-week course that would expose Charlie Sheen to a cross section of young Wall Street business people. The actor said, "I was impressed and very, very respectful of the fact that they could maintain that kind of aggressiveness and drive".

Douglas worked with a speech instructor on breath control in order to become better acclimatized to the fast rhythm of the film's dialogue. Early on in the shoot, Stone tested Douglas by enhancing his "repressed anger", according to the actor. At one point, Stone came into Douglas' trailer and asked him if he was doing drugs because "you look like you haven't acted before". This shocked Douglas, who did more research and worked on his lines again and again, pushing himself harder than he had before. All of this hard work culminated with the "Greed is good" speech. Stone planned to use a Fortune magazine cover in exchange for promotional advertisements, but Forbes magazine made a similar offer. Stone stuck with Fortune, which upset Forbes publisher Malcolm Forbes, who turned down a later request to use his private yacht. Stone switched from 12- to 14-hour shooting days in the last few weeks in order to finish principal photography before an impending Directors Guild of America strike and finished five days ahead of schedule. Sheen remembered that Stone was always looking at the script and at his watch.

== Soundtrack ==
The original score composed by Stewart Copeland was released on LP record in 1988, followed by a CD version in 1993.

| No. | Title | Length |
|---|---|---|
| 1. | "Kent: Unpredictable (from Talk Radio)" | 2:18 |
| 2. | "Dietz: Just Come Right in Here, Denise (from Talk Radio)" | 3:07 |
| 3. | "TLKa: We Know Where You Live (from Talk Radio)" | 3:52 |
| 4. | "Tick: We Feel Too Much (from Talk Radio)" | 2:48 |
| 5. | "Trend: He Has Heart (from Talk Radio)" | 3:12 |
| 6. | "Bud's Scam" | 2:51 |
| 7. | "Are You with Me?" | 1:15 |
| 8. | "Trading Begins" | 2:25 |
| 9. | "The Tall Weeds" | 3:04 |
| 10. | "Break-Up (Darian)" | 2:03 |
| 11. | "Anacott Steal" | 2:54 |
| 12. | "End Title Theme" | 1:09 |

== Themes ==
The film has come to be seen as the archetypal portrayal of 1980s excess, with Gekko advocating "greed, for lack of a better word, is good". Wall Street defines itself through a number of morality conflicts putting wealth and power against simplicity and honesty, and an attack on the value system of extreme competitiveness where ethics and the law are simply irrelevant parts of the show.

Carl (Martin Sheen's character) represents the working class in the film: he is the union leader for the maintenance workers at Bluestar and is vigilant against anything that he sees as a threat to them. The conflict between Gekko's relentless pursuit of wealth and Carl Fox's leftward leanings form the basis of the film's subtext. and could be characterized as two fathers battling for control over the morals of the son, a concept Stone had also used in Platoon. The producers of the film use Carl as their voice in the film, a voice of reason amid the creative destruction brought about by Gekko's unrestrained personal philosophy.

A significant scene in the film is a speech by Gekko to a shareholders' meeting of Teldar Paper, a company he is planning to take over. Stone uses this scene to give Gekko, and by extension, the Wall Street raiders he personifies, the chance to justify their actions, portraying himself as a liberator of the company value from the ineffective and excessively compensated executives. The inspiration for the "Greed is good" speech seems to have come from two sources. The first part, where Gekko complains that the company's management owns less than three percent of its stock, and that it has too many vice presidents, is taken from similar speeches and comments made by Carl Icahn about companies he was trying to take over. The defense of greed was adapted from a remark by Boesky, who himself was later convicted of insider trading charges. Delivering the 1986 commencement address to the School of Business Administration at the University of California, Berkeley, Boesky said, "Greed is all right, by the way. I want you to know that. I think greed is healthy. You can be greedy and still feel good about yourself."

Wall Street is not a wholesale criticism of capitalism, but of the cynical culture of the 1980s. The "good" characters in the film are themselves capitalists, but in a more steady, hardworking sense. In one scene, Gekko scoffs at Bud Fox's question as to the moral value of hard work, quoting the example of his (Gekko's) father, who worked hard his entire life only to die in debt. Sir Laurence Wildman (Terence Stamp) genuinely attempts to save Anacott Steel and ultimately saves Bluestar instead, although Gekko taunts him that he laid off thousands of workers in previous companies which he took over. Lou Mannheim, the film's archetypal mentor, says early in the film, that "good things sometimes take time", referring to IBM and Hilton—in contrast, Gekko's "Greed is Good" credo and his frequent references to Sun Tzu's The Art of War typify the short-term view prevalent in the 1980s.

== Reception ==
=== Box office ===
Wall Street was released on December 11, 1987, in 730 theaters and grossed $4.1 million on its opening weekend. It went on to make $43.8 million in the United States and Canada, earning theatrical rentals of $20 million. Internationally, it earned rentals of $21 million for a worldwide total of $41 million.

=== Critical response ===
The film has a 78% rating on Rotten Tomatoes based on 64 reviews. The consensus reads, "With Wall Street, Oliver Stone delivers a blunt but effective—and thoroughly well-acted—jeremiad against its era's veneration of greed as a means to its own end." On Metacritic it has a score of 56 out of 100 from 16 reviews, indicating "mixed or average reviews". Audiences polled by CinemaScore gave the film an average grade of "B" on an A+ to F scale.

In his review for The New York Times, Vincent Canby, while quite critical of the film overall, praised Douglas' work as "the funniest, canniest performance of his career". Roger Ebert gave the film three and a half stars out of four and praised it for allowing "all the financial wheeling and dealing to seem complicated and convincing, and yet always have it make sense. The movie can be followed by anybody, because the details of stock manipulation are all filtered through transparent layers of greed. Most of the time we know what's going on. All of the time, we know why". Time magazine's Richard Corliss wrote, "This time he works up a salty sweat to end up nowhere, like a triathlete on a treadmill. But as long as he keeps his players in venal, perpetual motion, it is great scary fun to watch him work out". In his review for The Globe and Mail, Jay Scott praised the performances of the two leads: "But Douglas's portrayal of Gordon Gekko is an oily triumph and as the kid Gekko thinks he has found in Fox ('Poor, smart and hungry; no feelings'), Charlie Sheen evolves persuasively from gung-ho capitalist child to wily adolescent corporate raider to morally appalled adult". Rita Kempley wrote in The Washington Post that the film "is at its weakest when it preaches visually or verbally. Stone doesn't trust the time-honored story line, supplementing the obvious moral with plenty of soapboxery". F.F. Mormani, writing for The Objective Standard, calls the film "mixed", explaining that it "accurately portray[s] some aspects of the financial profession and unjustly demonizing it, too. But," she concludes, "it is sufficiently thought provoking and philosophical to recommend watching or rewatching."

Michael Douglas won the Academy Award for Best Actor and thanked Oliver Stone for "casting me in a part that almost nobody thought I could play". However, Daryl Hannah's performance was not as well received and earned her a Golden Raspberry Award for Worst Supporting Actress, thus making this the only film to date to win both an Oscar and a Razzie. The "quintessential financial high-roller's attire" of Douglas in the film, designed by Alan Flusser, was emulated in the 1980s by yuppies.

Interest in the film was renewed in 1990 when the cover of Newsweek magazine asked, "Is Greed Dead?" after 1980s icons like Michael Milken and Ivan Boesky ran afoul of insider trading laws. Over the years, the film's screenwriter Stanley Weiser has been approached by numerous people who told him, "The movie changed my life. Once I saw it I knew that I wanted to get into such and such business. I wanted to be like Gordon Gekko". In addition, both Charlie Sheen and Michael Douglas still have people come up to them and say that they became stockbrokers because of their respective characters in the film. In 2002, Stone was asked how the financial market depicted in Wall Street has changed and he replied, "The problems that existed in the 1980s market grew and grew into a much larger phenomenon. Enron is a fiction, in a sense, in the same way that Gordon Gekko's buying and selling was a fiction ... Kenny Lay—he's the new Gordon Gekko". Entertainment Weekly magazine's Owen Gleiberman commented in 2009 that the film "reveals something now which it couldn't back then: that the Gordon Gekkos of the world weren't just getting rich—they were creating an alternate reality that was going to crash down on all of us."

A 20th-anniversary edition was released on September 18, 2007. New extras include an on-camera introduction by Stone, extensive deleted scenes, "Greed is Good" featurettes, and interviews with Michael Douglas and Martin Sheen.

In reviewing the film's sequel 23 years later, Variety noted that though the original film was "intended as a cautionary tale on the pitfalls of unchecked ambition and greed, Stone's 1987 original instead had the effect of turning Douglas' hugely charismatic (and Oscar-winning) villain into a household name and boardroom icon – an inspiration to the very power players and Wall Street wannabes for whom he set such a terrible example."

In 2024, Far Out magazine named Gordon Gekko one of the "10 most accurate movie psychopaths according to the FBI".

=== Accolades ===
The film is notable as being the only film to win both an Academy Award and a Golden Raspberry Award.

| Award | Category | Nominee(s) | Result |
|---|---|---|---|
| Academy Awards | Best Actor | Michael Douglas | Won |
| David di Donatello Awards | Best Foreign Actor | Michael Douglas | Won |
| Golden Camera Awards | Best International Actor | Michael Douglas | Won |
| Golden Globe Awards | Best Actor in a Motion Picture – Drama | Michael Douglas | Won |
| Golden Raspberry Awards | Worst Supporting Actress | Daryl Hannah | Won |
| Japan Academy Film Prize | Outstanding Foreign Language Film | | Nominated |
| Jupiter Awards | Best International Actor | Michael Douglas | Won |
| Kansas City Film Critics Circle Awards | Best Actor | Michael Douglas | Won |
| Nastro d'Argento | Best Foreign Actor | Michael Douglas | Won |
| National Board of Review Awards | Top Ten Films | | 9th Place |
| National Board of Review Awards | Best Actor | Michael Douglas | Won |
| New York Film Critics Circle Awards | Best Actor | Michael Douglas | Nominated |
| Sant Jordi Awards | Best Foreign Actor | Michael Douglas | Nominated |
| Satellite Awards | Best DVD Extras | | Nominated |

The film is recognized by American Film Institute in these lists:

- 2003: AFI's 100 Years...100 Heroes & Villains:
  - Gordon Gekko – #24 Villain
- 2005: AFI's 100 Years...100 Movie Quotes:
  - Gordon Gekko: "Greed, for lack of a better word, is good." – #57

== Sequel ==
In 2007, The New York Times reported that a sequel to Wall Street, to be subtitled Money Never Sleeps, was already in pre-production. Michael Douglas would reprise his role as Gordon Gekko. The film would also focus on Gekko, recently released from prison and re-entering a much more chaotic financial world than the one he once oversaw. Charlie Sheen would also reprise his character of Bud Fox, but only in a cameo role. Daryl Hannah would not be involved in the sequel.

By April 2009, 20th Century Fox confirmed that the sequel was already in development and announced that Oliver Stone would direct. In addition, Shia LaBeouf was cast with Josh Brolin. Javier Bardem had been considered, but Bardem dropped out due to scheduling conflicts. The film was finally released on September 24, 2010, and received mixed reviews.

== See also ==
- List of films featuring psychopaths and sociopaths
- Cyrtodactylus gordongekkoi, a species of gecko named after the character Gordon Gekko
