= Gordon Gekko =

Movie antagonist

- Wall Street character
- First appearance: Wall Street (1987)
- Last appearance: Wall Street: Money Never Sleeps (2010)
- Created by: Oliver Stone; Stanley Weiser
- Portrayed by: Michael Douglas

In-universe information
- Occupation: Corporate raider; author
- Spouse: Kate Gekko (ex-wife)
- Children: Rudy Gekko (son, deceased); Winnie Gekko-Moore (daughter)
- Relatives: Jacob Moore (son-in-law); Louis Moore (grandson)
- Nationality: American

Gordon Gekko is a composite character in the 1987 film Wall Street and its 2010 sequel Wall Street: Money Never Sleeps, both directed by Oliver Stone. Gekko was portrayed in both films by actor Michael Douglas, who won the Academy Award for Best Actor for his performance in the first film. In 2003, the American Film Institute named Gordon Gekko No. 24 on its Top 50 movie villains of all time.

== Characterization ==
Co-written by Stone and screenwriter Stanley Weiser, Gekko is said to be based loosely on several real-life financiers, including Stone's own father Louis Stone, Wall Street broker Owen Morrisey, an old friend of Stone's who was involved in a $20 million insider trading scandal in 1985, investment banker Dennis Levine, arbitrageur Ivan Boesky, corporate raider Carl Icahn, investor and art collector Asher Edelman, agent Michael Ovitz, and Stone himself. For example, Gekko's line "Greed, for lack of a better word, is good" was adapted from a remark by Boesky, who himself was later convicted on insider trading charges. Delivering the 1986 commencement address to the School of Business Administration at the University of California, Berkeley, Boesky said, "Greed is all right, by the way. I want you to know that. I think greed is healthy. You can be greedy and still feel good about yourself."

Edward R. Pressman, producer of both films, said, "Originally, there was no one individual who Gekko was modeled on", but that "Gekko was partly Milken", the "Junk Bond King" of the 1980s. According to Weiser, Gekko's style of speaking was inspired by Stone: "When I was writing some of the dialogue [...] I would listen to Oliver on the phone and sometimes he talks very rapid-fire, the way Gordon Gekko does", he said.

When creating the character for Gekko, Weiser wrote that "I formed an amalgam of disgraced arbitrageur Ivan Boesky, corporate raider Carl Icahn, and his lesser-known art-collecting compatriot Asher Edelman. Add a dash of Michael Ovitz and a heaping portion of, yes, my good friend and esteemed colleague Stone (who came up with the character’s name) -- and there you have the rough draft of ‘Gekko the Great.’ Gekko’s dialogue actually was inspired by Stone’s own rants." After the film's original character Gordon Gekko began being perceived as a hero instead of a villain, for his line "Greed is good," in 2008, Weiser wrote in op-ed in the Los Angeles Times titled "Repeat After Me: Greed is Not Good." He wrote that when he wrote the screenplay, "I never could have imagined that this persona and his battle cry would become part of the public consciousness, and that the core message of “Wall Street” – remember, he goes to jail in the end – would be so misunderstood by so many."

== Cultural impact ==
Gekko has become a symbol in popular culture for unrestrained greed (with the signature line, "Greed, for lack of a better word, is good"), often in fields outside corporate finance. On October 8, 2008, the character was referenced by Australian Prime Minister Kevin Rudd in his speech, "The Children of Gordon Gekko" concerning the 2008 financial crisis. Rudd stated "It is perhaps time now to admit that we did not learn the full lessons of the greed-is-good ideology. And today we are still cleaning up the mess of the 21st-century children of Gordon Gekko." On July 28, 2009, Cardinal Tarcisio Bertone cited Gekko's "Greed is good" slogan in a speech to the Italian Senate, saying that the free market had been replaced by a greed market, and also blamed such a mentality for the 2008 financial crisis. The FBI has used Gekko for an anti-insider trading campaign. Gekko is commemorated in the scientific name of a species of gecko, Cyrtodactylus gordongekkoi.

On September 25, 2008, Douglas, acting as a UN ambassador for peace, was at the 2008 session of the United Nations General Assembly. Reporters sought to ask him off-topic questions about Gekko. He was asked whether he "bore some responsibility for the behavior of the greed merchants who had brought the world to its knees". Trying to return to topic, Douglas suggested that "the same level of passion Wall Street investors showed should also apply to getting rid of nuclear weapons." Douglas was also asked to compare nuclear Armageddon with the "financial Armageddon on Wall Street". After one reporter inquired, "Are you saying, Gordon, that greed is not good?" Douglas stated, "I'm not saying that. And my name is not Gordon. It's a character I played 20 years ago." In 2013, psychiatrists Samuel Leistedt and Paul Linkowski published a study of the portrayal of psychopaths in film, and cited the Gekko character as a realistic portrayal of the successful, "corporate psychopath": "In terms of a 'successful psychopath'", they write, "Gordon Gekko from Wall Street (1987) is probably one of the most interesting, manipulative, psychopathic fictional characters to date."

== See also ==
- Margin Call
- Swimming with Sharks
- The Wolf of Wall Street
