= Kristine Miller =

American actress (1925–2015)

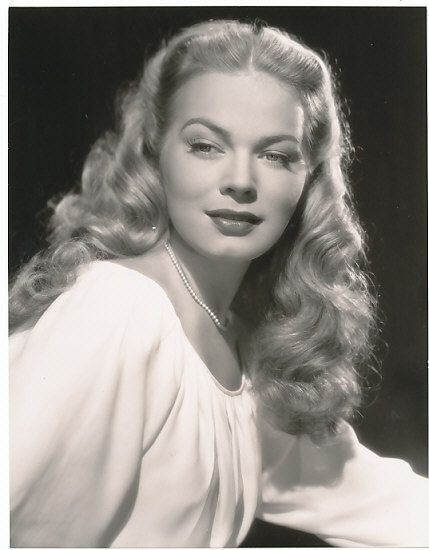
- Kristine Miller in 1957
- Born: Jacqueline Olivia Eskesen; June 13, 1925; Buenos Aires, Argentina
- Died: Late 2015 (aged 90); Monterey, California, U.S.
- Education: San Francisco State College
- Occupation: Film actress
- Years active: 1945–1961
- Spouse: William Schuyler (m. 1953; died 2013)
- Children: 2

Kristine Miller (born Jacqueline Olivia Eskesen, June 13, 1925 – 2015) was an American film actress. She appeared in film noir and Westerns. A discovery of Paramount producer Hal Wallis, she appeared in I Walk Alone (1948), Jungle Patrol (1948), Too Late for Tears (1949), Shadow on the Wall (1950), and the TV series Stories of the Century (1954–55).

== Early life ==
Miller was born Jacqueline Olivia Eskesen, the younger of two daughters of Johannes Bach Eskesen, a Danish oil executive, and US-born Myrtle Bennett Eskesen (née Witham; 1890–1976), an Orpheum Circuit singer from Fresno, California.

Her father was vice-president of Standard Oil of Argentina, headquartered in Buenos Aires, where Miller and her older sister, Dorothea, were born. After a decade in Argentina, the family sailed to New Orleans, landing in July 1931. They temporarily moved to Myrtle's hometown of Fresno for a year, then moved to Copenhagen, Denmark in 1932 when Miller was 7 years old. In 1938, before the beginning of the Second World War in Europe, mother and daughters relocated again, this time to Long Island, New York. Later they moved back to Fresno, then on to San Francisco, California, where Jacqueline became a naturalized United States citizen on December 7, 1942.

Having lived in Argentina and Denmark as a child, she spoke English, Spanish and Danish fluently, and had a working knowledge of Portuguese and German. During her formative years, she showed no interest in acting. Miller said of her childhood, "My mother was a professional singer and I think she was eager for me to go into the entertainment field." However, after she played a main role in her high school's production of George S. Kaufman's The American Way (1939), her taste for show business began to form. In one version of how she was discovered by Hollywood, in 1944 the 18-year-old Miller saw an opportunity when a Warner Brothers talent scout was to attend one of her school's performances. The scout never showed up, so she sent a letter and photograph to the studio, and garnered a screen test at Warner, where she changed her name to Kristine Miller. When Miller set out for Hollywood, she recalled, "People said to my mother, 'Are you letting that girl go to that awful place?'" But her mother replied, "I know that girl, and she'll be all right." Although she failed the screen test, she was noticed by producer Hal Wallis, who was then feuding with the studio head, Jack L. Warner. Under acrimonious circumstances, Wallis left Warner Brothers for Paramount Pictures. Wallis brought with him Miller and another actress that also failed a screen test at Warner, the 21-year-old Lizabeth Scott.

== Paramount years ==
=== I Walk Alone ===
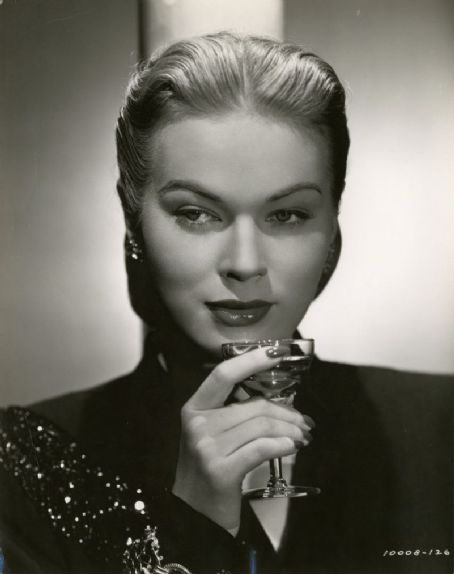
Kristine Miller in I Walk Alone

At Paramount, Miller made her debut, an uncredited bit part, opposite fellow newcomer Lizabeth Scott in You Came Along (1945). Miller played a showgirl and was billed as "Jacqueleen Eskeson." The pair would appear together in five films, four of them produced by Hal Wallis. Production ran February 6–April 6, 1945.

In 1946, Miller was loaned out to Monogram Pictures. She played a model in the 1946 film noir, Suspense, where she appears as a party guest. Production ran mid-October–early December 1945. Around this time, Miller moved into the old Wallace Reid mansion in Coldwater Canyon, then converted into a boarding house for aspiring actresses known as "The House of the Seven Garbos". Among the boarders were Ruth Roman, Suzan Ball and Linda Christian. According to Doris Lilly, a former boarder and later society columnist, "The dignity of the house in general was presided over and encouraged by Kristine Miller, who was blonde haired, high of cheekbone, grey eyed. Kristine had balance, she would check some of our madder impulses, kept us calm when that was necessary. Her manner was quiet and refined, and she had a way of touching a grubby coffeepot as if it were the tiara of the Empress Josephine. In spite of her reserve, we all knew that Kristine had a fine future for her somewhere, and we felt that she was an excellent actress."

In July 1946, it was announced that Hal Wallis planned to star Miller in the film version of the Broadway play, Beggars Are Coming to Town (1945), a noirish story of betrayal and vengeance. Wallis intended this to be Miller's breakout role. Yet Wallis would skip the usual publicity buildup for a budding actress. Miller was to play a torch singer, Kay Lawrence, who befriends a convict, Frankie Madison, who returns to New York after 14 years in prison. Kay's boyfriend, Noll "Dink" Turner, is the owner of the Regent Club, which Frankie claims to own half of. Tired of Kay, Noll sends her to sweet-talk Frankie in an effort to stall for time. Meanwhile, Noll intends to dump Kay and marry a socialite. Both men battle for control of the business that Turner built while Frankie was in prison.

In the winter of 1946, Miller appeared briefly in Western noir, Desert Fury (1947). She played the priggish Claire Lindquist, daughter of a corrupt judge. Shooting took place from mid-August to early November, 1946. Unusual for such a small role, Wallis ensured Miller received 6th billing, after Wendall Corey, despite her role being little more than walk-on. The film was released August 15, 1947.

Immediately after Desert Fury, Wallis began work on Deadlock, the original project name for Beggars Are Coming to Town. Again Miller would be cast with Desert Fury's Burt Lancaster and Wendell Corey. After weeks of rehearsals on the Modjeska Canyon location, under the direction of Byron Haskin, Miller suddenly became the second leading lady. Lizabeth Scott, ever competitive with all actresses, grabbed the Kay role for herself. Miller later recalled, "(Wallis) planned to star me in 'I Walk Alone.' He tested me with Burt; it was a wonderful test. But then Lizabeth Scott decided she wanted the role, and Lizabeth got whatever she wanted—from Hal Wallis! [laughs] So, I got the second part instead." The 21-year-old Miller was recast as the slumming socialite divorcée, Alexis Richardson. Miller was afraid that playing a "meanie" role might typecast her. She was also forced to cut her 22-inch hair into a shorter chignon. In designing Miller's wardrobe, Edith Head was impressed by Miller's physique, describing it as "the most exciting figure since Betty Grable." The resulting film was renamed I Walk Alone (1948). Shooting took place early December 1946–mid-February 1947. The film was released January 16, 1948. She was 5th-billed after Kirk Douglas. Despite Miller's fears of being typecast as a femme fatale, film historians tend to typecast her "as always playing the 'good girl.'" Typecasting reflected real life as Miller's name seldom appeared in gossip columns and when it did, it never involved scandal. Though Miller participated in the Hollywood dating circuit, the one name that invariably appeared in the press was William Haskel Schuyler, a television pioneer and consultant based in San Francisco. In late November 1947, it was announced that Miller and Schuyler would wed. But the marriage was postponed.

=== Jungle Patrol ===
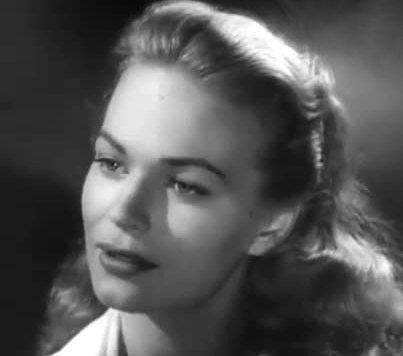
Kristine Miller in Jungle Patrol

In early May 1948, Miller was loaned out again, this time to 20th Century Fox for West of Tomorrow—her first leading lady role. The screenplay was based on William Bowers' play of the same name. During WW2 in New Guinea, a US Army Air Force squadron has been assigned to protect Australia and despite having inflicted heavy casualties on the Japanese, they supernaturally had none themselves. Miller played Jean Gillis, a Broadway actress and former anti-war activist, who joined the USO after her husband's death at Dunkirk. By happenstance, she ends up having to entertain the airmen by herself when she finds out the rest of her troupe is stranded. During an improvised "dinner dance," she learns about the pilots' wives and girlfriends and their hopes for the future, but equally learns about herself. Arthur Franz makes his film debut as Miller's love interest. The next morning, all but the squadron leader and Jean are killed after an attack on the airstrip. Similar to Death Takes a Holiday (1934), the airmen reach the epiphany of their lives in the few hours they spend with Jean. The resulting film was released as Jungle Patrol (1948), the sole film that Miller had 1st-place billing. Despite Miller's preference for Bowers' original title, the film is her personal favorite.

After establishing herself as a "discovery" of Hal Wallis, Miller soon found herself left behind. In an interview with Mike Fitzgerald, she was quoted as saying, "Hal called me the 'Viking Girl.' He didn't know what to do with me." The situation was aggravated by the return of veteran actors from overseas, either in uniform or the USO. Compounded by the economic slump after the war, rise of television and the breakup of the studio system, Miller's initial difficulties during the war years would be multiplied many fold. Miller's prospects began to look a little better when she met journalist and film producer Mark Hellinger, who felt sure that she could become a star. But Hellinger died suddenly in 1947, and Miller soon found herself making a living with the usual small roles that she had always been given. Of the nine films she would make under contract to Paramount, three were loan-outs to other studios, two of which were more significant than her Paramount films, with the exception of I Walk Alone. Typical of the Paramount years, in Sorry, Wrong Number (1948), she was cast as the wife of the investigating detective but was recast as the mistress of the physician, dropping from 3rd to 13th place in billing.

Later that year, she moved on to a more substantial part, again opposite Lizabeth Scott, in Too Late for Tears (1949). In her third and last loan-out—this time to United Artists—Miller played Kathy Palmer, the sister-in-law of Jane Palmer (Scott), whom she suspects has murdered her brother. As she is romanced by Don DeFore, the pair quietly investigate the shady dealings of Jane. Though shooting took place mid-September to mid-October 1948 at Republic Pictures, the film was released July 8, 1949. Miller was 5th-billed after Arthur Kennedy.

At the end of 1948, Miller made a brief appearance in the "weepie" Paid in Full (1950). In the last film she would do for Paramount, Miller was to play Nancy Langley, the younger modeling sister of Jane (Lizabeth Scott), a department store illustrator, who allows her younger sister to marry Bill Prentice (Robert Cummings), despite Jane's love for him. A few years later, Jane has an argument with Nancy, who catches Jane and Bill having an affair. Distraught, Jane backs up her car and accidentally kills her young niece. But as with I Walk Alone, Miller's role was given to another actress—Diana Lynn. Miller ended up playing a bridesmaid at Nancy's wedding, dropping from 3rd to 10th place in billing. Production ran mid-October–late November 1948. The film would not be released until March 1950. In February 1949, it was announced that Miller's contact with Paramount was dropped due to the post-war slump in the film industry. That December, Miller's marriage with William Schuyler was again announced, then again postponed.

=== Freelancer ===
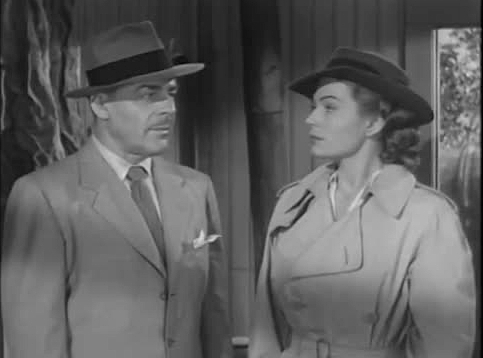
Kristine Miller and Brian Donlevy in Dangerous Assignment

Undaunted by career setbacks, Miller tried her hand with smaller studios such as Monogram and Republic Pictures, though she would still work for the occasional big studio. Miller also made further incursions in the then-new medium of television, which she began before her contract with Paramount was dropped. Despite the demands of raising a family, the 1950s would be Miller's most prolific years, seeing her as a television regular. Throughout the '50s, she was able to display a broader acting range than when under Paramount and Hal Wallis. Although she missed out on playing Lizabeth Scott's character's younger sister in Paid in Full, she played a younger sister in the noirish Shadow on the Wall (1950), which also involved two sisters competing over the same man. The elder sister, played by Ann Sothern, discovers that her younger, married sister is having an affair with Sothern's fiancé, which leads to murderous results and short screen-time for Miller. Production ran from April 11th to mid-May, 1949. Though never leaving the noir genre, Miller would begin her reputation for Westerns with Young Daniel Boone (1950), but as the female lead. Production ran from mid-October to late October 1949.

Later that year she would return to the Western genre with High Lonesome (1950). John Drew Barrymore plays a misunderstood teenager, Cooncat, who creates a rift between Miller's rancher father and her fiancé, who believes Cooncat murdered his parents. Shooting took place early January–mid-January 1950 on location in Texas. Miller recalled the weather on the range being cold, not hot as the film depicted. In November 1950, after years of avoiding femme fatale roles, she finally played against type as Lady DeWinter in "The Three Musketeers", the pilot episode of Magnavox Theatre. It was released in the theaters as Sword of D'Artagnan.

In the fall of 1951, Miller was cast as an Eastern European in the Cold War thriller, The Steel Fist (1952), opposite Roddy McDowall. Miller played Marlina, a young woman who hides a student protester (McDowall) from the communists. Production ran late August–September 4, 1951. Similar to the Swedish-American actress, Virginia Christine, Miller's familiarity with non-English languages enabled her to mimic foreign accents, which she used to various effect on television episodes where she played Europeans (Dangerous Assignment) or immigrants to America (The Millionaire). She was careful to avoid caricature. Production ran late August–September 4, 1951.

In 1952, Miller appeared in her second femme fatale role. In "The Iron Banner Story", an episode of Dangerous Assignment, an espionage series starring Brian Donlevy, she played Lilli Terrescu, a woman with a dark secret in post-war Greece. As with The Steel Fist, Miller used her accent skills in two Dangerous Assignment episodes and later in The Millionaire episode, "The Anton Bohrman Story." Later in the year, Miller was the second female lead in her first musical, Tropical Heat Wave (1952). Production ran May 31–mid-June 1952.

In the spring of 1953, Miller traveled to Hawaii and rejoined her I Walk Alone costar, Burt Lancaster. She spent 10 days in the islands. She was cast as Georgette, Donna Reed's roommate in From Here to Eternity. But most of her footage ended up on the cutting room floor: "'I don't even say I made that one; I'm hardly in it. I think you see my arm; that's about it' (laughs)." Miller was more impressed by the performances of Frank Sinatra and Montgomery Clift, whom she watched working before the camera. Production ran March 7–May 5, 1953. On July 27, 1953, Miller finally married William Schuyler in Santa Barbara. That October, it was announced that the Schuylers were expecting their first baby. Their daughter, Linda Elizabeth, was born on February 22, 1954.

In 1954, Miller appeared as the second leading lady in three films. Flight Nurse (1954), starring Joan Leslie, was a drama about US Air Force flight nurses in the Korean War. Miller is a fellow officer of Leslie, involved in a romantic triangle with two pilots. Production ran May 14–mid-June 1953. Geraldine (1954) is a comedy starring Mala Powers. Production ran late June to mid-July 1953. In the noir Western Hell's Outpost, Miller again costarred with Leslie. Production ran July 8–late July 1954. Hell's Outpost introduced Miller to Jim Davis, who would be the male lead for the only television series that Miller had a continuing role in. During the 1950s, both Joan Leslie and Miller, by now friends, were involved with fundraising for St. Anne's maternity hospital in Los Angeles. During that year, Miller made two appearances on the television series The Lone Wolf, starring Louis Hayward. In one episode, Miller played an adulterous wife reminiscent of The Shadow on the Wall, but is shot by her cuckolded husband instead. She made a guest appearance as Mrs. Manning on Republic's first television series, Stories of the Century, starring Mary Castle and Miller's old Hell's Outpost costar, Jim Davis.

==== Stories of the Century ====
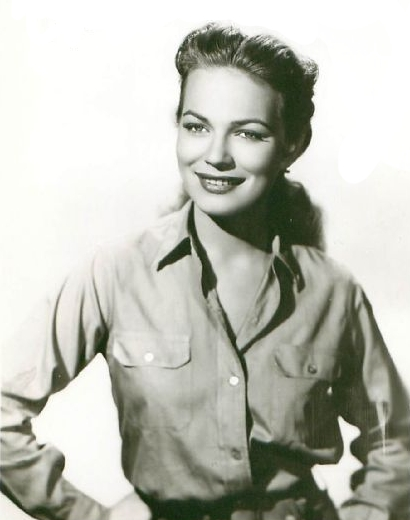
Kristine Miller in Stories of the Century

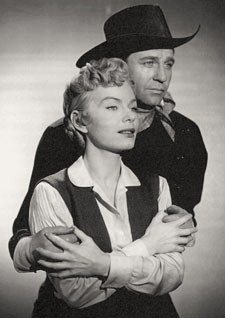
With Jim Davis in Stories of the Century

In 1955, Miller returned to Stories of the Century to star in her most famous role—Margaret "Jonesy" Jones. The series concerned a pair of railroad detectives dealing with cases from the 1850s to the first decade of the 20th century, "wrapping them around previously shot films and serials to save money." This gave the series the illusion of a much bigger budget. Typically, the Jones character would do reconnaissance before Matt Clark (Jim Davis) arrived, misleading everyone into thinking the two were not working together. Originally Miller was to star in the series, but was unable due to her first pregnancy. As a result, Mary Castle, a Rita Hayworth lookalike, took her place for the first 26 episodes. Castle had portrayed Clark's fellow detective Frankie Adams. After Castle quit or was fired, Miller replaced her, much to the disappointment of the then director, William Witney, who left after directing a few episodes with Miller. Despite the change of leading lady and the replacement of Witney, Stories of the Century with Miller went on to be the first Western to win an Emmy Award in 1955. Despite the award and excellent ratings, the series was cancelled. Miller's favorite episode is "Jim Courtright," in which her character poses as a seductive barmaid while infiltrating a protection racket. In Miller's last episode of the series, she and Davis investigate a horse theft by the outlaw L. H. Musgrove.

After the cancellation of Century, Miller changed genres with the first of four appearances on Science Fiction Theater. In "The Strange Dr. Lorenz" (1955), she played the wife of a physician, whose debilitating condition is cured by a miraculous royal jelly. But the jelly has an unexpected side-effect. In "Operation Flypaper" (1956) she and Vincent Price are scientists trying to catch a thief who can suspend time. During this period, Miller would make three Western films in succession: Thunder over Arizona (1956), Domino Kid (1957) and The Persuader (1957), a religious Western starring William Talman. Miller rejoined Jim Davis for the last time in an episode of M Squad — "The Case of the Double Face" (May 23, 1958), starring Lee Marvin. Miller is married to a mild-mannered, bespectacled Davis, who is accused by the Chicago police of being a jewel thief. Miller's last film role was in The Heart Is a Rebel (1958), a religious drama starring Ethel Waters.

Miller appeared in two episodes of CBS's The Texan, starring Rory Calhoun as Bill Longley—"The Gunfighter" (1959) and "The Accuser" (1960). In "The Gunfighter," Miller is a single mother with a rebellious teenage son, who challenges Longley to a gunfight. She rejoined Donna Reed in "Lucky Girl" (1959) and "Character Building" (1961) on the ABC sitcom, The Donna Reed Show. Her last television appearance was as Ruth Hudson in the 1961 episode "Prince Jim" of NBC's Tales of Wells Fargo, starring Dale Robertson. Of the genres and cross-genres spanning her film career, Miller participated in making five traditional noirs, one noir-thriller, four Westerns, two noir Westerns, one religious Western, three military dramas, two comedies, one comedy-drama, one soap opera, one religious drama and one musical. Seven of Miller's roles were walk-ons or deleted from the final film. Her television work involved similar genres. In contradistinction to being only a supporting actress as described by most film historians, she was leading lady in six of 22 films.

== Entrepreneur ==
Due to demands of family and her husband's business, Miller retired from acting. The Schuylers left Los Angeles for the San Francisco Bay Area in the early 1960s. Previous to the move, her husband was setting up television stations throughout Northern California, such as Sacramento's KSCH and KTVU in Oakland.

Together with William they founded two television stations in Monterey, KMST and the Spanish-language KSMS, the latter being of special interest to Miller. The Schuylers eventually settled on the Monterey peninsula in 1969, where William became president of the Schuyler Broadcasting Corporation.

== Later years ==
The Schuylers later lived in Idaho during the 1990s, where they started two television stations. They returned to Monterey in June 2001. Miller lectured on her experience in film and television in Monterey as well as participating in local charitable activities.

On February 4, 2016, a family spokesperson announced that Miller had died at the age of 90 in late 2015 at a hospital in Monterey, California. A memorial service for Miller was held at St. Dunstan's Episcopal Church in Carmel Valley, CA, on February 13, 2016. Her remains were cremated and her ashes scattered over the Pacific Ocean.

== Performances ==
=== Filmography ===
No.	Year	Title, US release year	Studio, producer	Director, screen- writer	Miller's role	Leading man	Costars	Notes
1	1945	You Came Along*	Paramount, Hal Wallis	John Farrow, Ayn Rand	Showgirl	Robert Cummings	Lizabeth Scott, Don DeFore, Charles Drake, Helen Forrest, Kim Hunter	Uncredited
2	1946	Suspense*	Monogram, Maurice King	Frank Tuttle, Philip Yordan	Model	Barry Sullivan	Belita	Uncredited
3	1947	The Trouble with Women*	Paramount, Harry Tugend	Sidney Lanfield, Arthur Sheekman	Coquette	Ray Milland	Teresa Wright, Brian Donlevy	Uncredited
4	1947	Desert Fury	Paramount, Hal Wallis	Lewis Allen, Robert Rossen	Claire Lindquist	John Hodiak	Lizabeth Scott, Burt Lancaster, Mary Astor, Wendell Corey	
5	1948	I Walk Alone	Paramount, Hal Wallis	Byron Haskin, Charles Schnee	Alexis Richardson	Burt Lancaster	Lizabeth Scott, Kirk Douglas, Wendell Corey	
6	1948	Sorry, Wrong Number	Paramount, Hal Wallis	Anatole Litvak, Lucille Fletcher	Dolly	Burt Lancaster	Barbara Stanwyck, Ann Richards, Wendell Corey	Uncredited
7	1948	Jungle Patrol*	20th Century Fox, Frank N. Seltzer	Joe Newman, Francis Swann	Jean Gillis**	Arthur Franz	Ross Ford, Mickey Knox, Richard Jaeckel, Harry Lauter	
8	1949	Too Late for Tears	United Artists, Hunt Stromberg	Byron Haskin, Roy Huggins	Kathy Palmer	Don DeFore	Lizabeth Scott, Dan Duryea, Arthur Kennedy	
9	1950	Paid in Full	Paramount, Hal Wallis	William Dieterle, Robert Blees	Miss Williams	Robert Cummings	Lizabeth Scott, Diana Lynn, Eve Arden, Ray Collins	
10	1950	Young Daniel Boone	Monogram, James S. Burkett	Reginald LeBorg, Clint Johnston	Rebecca Bryan**	David Bruce	Damian O'Flynn	
11	1950	Shadow on the Wall	MGM, Robert Sisk	Patrick Jackson, William Ludwig	Celia Starrling	Zachary Scott	Ann Sothern, Gigi Perreau; Nancy Davis	
12	1950	High Lonesome	Arfran Productions, George Templeton	Alan Le May, (director and screenwriter)	Abby Davis	John Drew Barrymore	Chill Wills, John Archer	
13	1952	The Steel Fist	Monogram, Wesley Barry	Wesley Barry, C. K. Kivari	Marlina**	Roddy McDowall	Harry Lauter	
14	1952	Tropical Heat Wave	Republic, Herbert J. Yates	R. G. Springsteen, Arthur T. Horman	Sylvia Enwright	Robert Hutton	Estelita	
15	1953	From Here to Eternity	Columbia, Buddy Adler	Fred Zinnemann, Daniel Taradash	Georgette	Burt Lancaster	Montgomery Clift, Deborah Kerr, Donna Reed	Uncredited
16	1953	Flight Nurse	Republic, Herbert J. Yates	Allan Dwan, Alan Le May	Lt. Kit Ramsey	Forrest Tucker	Joan Leslie, Arthur Franz	
17	1953	Geraldine	Republic, Herbert J. Yates	R. G. Springsteen, Peter Milne	Ellen Blake	John Carroll	Mala Powers	
18	1954	Hell's Outpost	Republic, Herbert J. Yates	Joe Kane, Kenneth Gamet	Beth Hodes	Rod Cameron	Joan Leslie, Chill Wills	
19	1956	Thunder Over Arizona	Republic, Joe Kane	Joe Kane, Sloan Nibley	Fay Warren**	Skip Homeier	George Macready, Wallace Ford	
20	1957	The Persuader	Allied Artists, Dick Ross	Dick Ross, Curtis Kenyon	Kathryn Bonham**	William Talman	James Craig	
21	1957	Domino Kid	Columbia, Rory Calhoun	Ray Nazarro, Kenneth Gamet	Barbara Ellison**	Rory Calhoun	Andrew Duggan, Yvette Dugay	
22	1958	The Heart is a Rebel	World Wide Pictures, Dick Ross	Dick Ross, Richard James	Mrs. Johnson	John Milford	Ethel Waters, Georgia Lee, Scotty Morrow	

Titles in the public domain.* See cites for copyright renewal dates. Leading lady roles**

=== Television ===
No.	Title, US release year	Studio, producer	Director, screen- writer	Miller's role	Leading man	Costars
1	Variety (1948)	NBC		Herself	Cesar Romero	
2	Your Show Time "The Celebrated Jumping Frog of Calaveras County" (June 17, 1949)	National Telefilm Associates, Marshall Grant	Sobey Martin, Walter Doniger		Kirby Grant	
3	The Magnavox Theatre "The Three Musketeers" (November 24, 1950)	Hal Roach Studios, Hal Roach Jr.	Budd Boetticher, Roy Hamilton	Lady DeWinter	Robert Clarke	John Hubbard
4	Stars Over Hollywood "A Letter from Home" (July 23, 1951)	NBC, Sherman A. Harris	Axel Gruenberg, Jack Preston		William Andrews	Jeanne Bates
5	The Adventures of Wild Bill Hickok "Outlaw Flats" (November 4, 1951)	William F. Broidy Productions, William F. Broidy	Frank McDonald, William Raynor	Cindy**	Guy Madison	Andy Devine
6	Kraft Television Theatre "Never Be the Same" (November 14, 1951)	J. Walter Thompson Agency			Howard Freeman	Jean Adair
7	Gruen Playhouse "The Case of the Cavorting Statue" (November 29, 1951)	ABC	Richard Irving, Howard J. Green		Caesar Romero	Ann Rutherford
8	Gruen Playhouse "The Driven Snow" (October 4, 1951)	ABC	Axel Gruenberg (director)		Bruce Cabot	
9	China Smith "My Ship Has a Golden Keel"	Bernard Tabakin (producer)	Robert C. Dennis (screenwriter)	Leora	Dan Duryea	
10	Dangerous Assignment "The Iron Banner Story" (1952)	Donlevy Development Company, Harold E. Knox	Bill Karn, Al C. Ward	Lilli Terrescu**	Brian Donlevy	Lyle Talbot
11	Dangerous Assignment "The Parachute Story" (1952)	Donlevy Development Company, Harold E. Knox	Bill Karn, Robert Ryf	Ilana Draska**	Brian Donlevy	John Dehner
12	Big Town "Pot O' Gold" (March 26, 1953)	Gross-Krasne Productions, Mark Stevens	Charles F. Haas, Al C. Ward	Jill Long	Richard Tyler	
13	Fireside Theater "To Stand Alone" (May 20, 1952)	General Television Enterprises, Frank Wisbar	Frank Wisbar, John Larkin		Stanley Andrews	Scott Elliott
14	Fireside Theater "The People's Choice" (October 14, 1952)	General Television Enterprises, Frank Wisbar	Frank Wisbar, John Larkin		Paul E. Burns	Barbara Brown
15	Fireside Theater "Mission to Algiers" (April 21, 1953)	General Television Enterprises, Frank Wisbar	Frank Wisbar, Fred Freiberger		William Bishop	Peter Brocco
16	Schlitz Playhouse of Stars "Storm Warnings" (July 10, 1953)	Meridian Productions, William Self	Bill Karn, Paul Ludwig	Wanda	Robert Stack	Stanley Blystone, Arthur Franz
17	Campbell Playhouse "Innocent Till Proven Guilty" (July 10, 1953)	NBC, Martin Horrell	Garry Simpson, Frank De Felitta		Paul McGrath	Leora Dana
18	Lux Video Theatre "Some Call It Love" (August 27, 1953)	J. Walter Thompson Agency, Jack J. Gross	Peter Godfrey, Erna Lazarus		Charles McGraw	Barbara Knudson, Carole Mathews
19	My Little Margie "A Day at the Beach" (September 16, 1953)	Roland Reed Productions, Hal Roach Jr.	Hal Yates (director)		Charles Farrell	Gale Storm
20	Ramar of the Jungle "Jungle Terror" (1954)	Arrow Productions, Rudolph C. Flothow	Wallace Fox, Charles R. Condon	Mary**	Jon Hall	Ray Montgomery, Harry Lauter
21	The Lone Wolf "The Wife Story" (1954)	Gross-Krasne Productions, Donald Hyde	Christian Nyby, Antony Ellis	Kay Richman**	Louis Hayward	John Doucette, Dabbs Greer
22	The Lone Wolf "The Karachi Story" (1954)	Gross-Krasne Productions, Donald Hyde	Alfred E. Green, Bernard Girard	Lynn**	Louis Hayward	Lowell Gilmore
23	Stories of the Century "Henry Plummer" (1954)*	Studio City Television Productions, Edward J. White	William Witney, Dwight Cummins	Mrs. Manning	Jim Davis	Mary Castle, John Dehner, Lane Bradford
24	Stories of the Century "Burt Alvord" (January 2, 1955)*	Studio City Television Productions, Edward J. White	William Witney, Maurice Tombragel	Margaret "Jonesy" Jones**	Jim Davis	Chris Drake, Paul Sorensen, Fran Bennett
25	Stories of the Century "Apache Kid" (January 9, 1955)*	Studio City Television Productions, Edward J. White	William Witney, Maurice Tombragel	Margaret "Jonesy" Jones**	Jim Davis	Kenneth Alton
26	Stories of the Century "Tom Bell" (January 16, 1955)*	Studio City Television Productions, Edward J. White	William Witney, Budd Lesser	Margaret "Jonesy" Jones**	Jim Davis	Glen Gordon, Jean Dean
27	Stories of the Century "Kate Bender" (January 23, 1955)*	Studio City Television Productions, Edward J. White	William Witney, Maurice Tombragel	Margaret "Jonesy" Jones**	Jim Davis	Veda Ann Borg
28	Stories of the Century "Augustine Chacon" (January 30, 1955)*	Studio City Television Productions, Edward J. White	Franklin Adreon, Milton Raison	Margaret "Jonesy" Jones**	Jim Davis	Rodolfo Hoyos, Jr.
29	Stories of the Century "Cherokee Bill" (February 1, 1955)*	Studio City Television Productions, Edward J. White	Franklin Adreon, Milton Raison	Margaret "Jonesy" Jones**	Jim Davis	Pat Hogan, Robert Burton, Frank Sully
30	Stories of the Century "Nate Champion" (February 6, 1955)*	Studio City Television Productions, Edward J. White	Franklin Adreon, Budd Lesser	Margaret "Jonesy" Jones**	Jim Davis	Henry Brandon
31	Stories of the Century "Sontag and Evans" (February 8, 1955)*	Studio City Television Productions, Edward J. White	Franklin Adreon, Maurice Tombragel	Margaret "Jonesy" Jones**	Jim Davis	John Smith, Morris Ankrum
32	Stories of the Century "Rube Burrows" (February 15, 1955)*	Studio City Television Productions, Edward J. White	Franklin Adreon, Maurice Tombragel	Margaret "Jonesy" Jones**	Jim Davis	Paul Picerni
33	Stories of the Century "Jim Courtright" (February 22, 1955)*	Studio City Television Productions, Edward J. White	Franklin Adreon, Joe Richardson	Margaret "Jonesy" Jones**	Jim Davis	Robert Knapp
34	Stories of the Century "Milt Sharp" (February 28, 1955)*	Studio City Television Productions, Edward J. White	Franklin Adreon, Maurice Tombragel	Margaret "Jonesy" Jones**	Jim Davis	Don "Red" Barry
35	Stories of the Century "Jack Slade" (March 4, 1955)*	Studio City Television Productions, Edward J. White	Franklin Adreon, Milton Raison	Margaret "Jonesy" Jones**	Jim Davis	Gregg Palmer
36	Stories of the Century "L.H. Musgrove" (March 11, 1955)*	Studio City Television Productions, Edward J. White	Franklin Adreon, Maurice Tombragel	Margaret "Jonesy" Jones**	Jim Davis	John Archer
37	Soldiers of Fortune "Jungle Search" (April 14, 1955)	Revue Productions	John English, Lawrence Kimble	Dr. Steiner**	John Russell	Chick Chandler
38	Stage 7 "The Magic Hat" (April 24, 1955)	Sharpe-Lewis, Warren Lewis	Lewis R. Foster, Irving Gaynor Neiman	Ann Coker**	George Brent	Lydia Reed
39	Crossroads "Mightier Than the Sword" (December 2, 1955)	Federal Telefilms, Harry Joe Brown	Paul Landres, George Bruce	Miss Smith	Richard Curtis	Edit Angold
40	Cavalcade of America "Call Home the Heart" (February 21, 1956)	Flying 'A' Productions, Warren Lewis	László Benedek, Jo Pagano		Donald Curtis	Don C. Harvey
41	Science Fiction Theatre "The Strange Dr. Lorenz" (July 15, 1955)	ZIV Television Programs, Ivan Tors	Leigh Jason, Norman Jolley	Helen Tuttle**	Edmund Gwenn	Donald Curtis
42	Science Fiction Theatre "Operation Flypaper" (July 15, 1956)	ZIV Television Programs, Ivan Tors	Eddie Davis, Doris Gilbert	Alma Ford**	Vincent Price	George Eldredge, John Eldredge
43	Science Fiction Theatre; The Voice (October 26, 1956)	ZIV Television Programs, Ivan Tors	Paul Guilfoyle, Doris Gilbert	Anna Brown**	Donald Curtis	William Phipps
44	Science Fiction Theatre "Bolt of Lightning" (February 1, 1957)	ZIV Television Programs, Ivan Tors	Eddie Davis, Meyer Dolinsky	Cynthia Blake	Bruce Bennett	Sydney Smith, Lyle Talbot
45	The Millionaire "The Anton Bohrman Story" (January 23, 1957)	CBS, Don Fedderson	Alfred E. Green, Barry Trivers	Anya Bohrman**	Charles Korvin	Marvin Miller
46	The Millionaire "The Larry Parker Story" (October 27, 1957)	CBS, Don Fedderson	Alfred E. Green, Jo Pagano	Cecille	Joseph Waring	Marvin Miller
47	The Restless Gun "The Torn Flag" (May 15, 1958)	Window Glen Productions, David Dortort	Frank Burt (screenwriter)	Mrs. Wheeler	John Payne	Alan Baxter
48	M Squad "The Case of the Double Face" (May 23, 1958)	Latimer Productions, John Larkin	Sidney Lanfield, Seeleg Lester	Mrs. Jane Evans**	Lee Marvin	Jim Davis
49	Wagon Train "The Rex Montana Story" (1958)	Revue Productions, Howard Christie	Jesse Hibbs, Warren Wilson	Loetha	Ward Bond	Forrest Tucker
50	Father Knows Best "It's a Small World" (March 9, 1959)	Rodney-Young Productions, Eugene B. Rodney	Peter Tewksbury, Dorothy Cooper	Marta Evans	Robert Young	Jane Wyatt
51	The Texan "The Gunfighter" (June 8, 1959)	Desilu Productions, Rory Calhoun	Erle C. Kenton, Donald S. Sanford	Ruth Fenton**	Rory Calhoun	Dick Kallman
52	The Texan "The Accuser" (June 6, 1960)	Desilu Productions, Rory Calhoun	Erle C. Kenton (director and screenwriter)	Mattie Benton**	Rory Calhoun	Don Haggerty
53	The Donna Reed Show "Lucky Girl" (December 31, 1959)	Todon, Tony Owen	Oscar Rudolph, Nate Monaster	Betty Murdoch	Carl Betz	Donna Reed
54	The Donna Reed Show "Character Building" (January 5, 1961)	Todon, Tony Owen	Jeffrey Hayden, Clifford Goldsmith	Edna	Carl Betz	Donna Reed, Shelley Fabares, Paul Petersen
55	Tales of Wells Fargo "Prince Jim" (March 27, 1961)	Overland Productions		Ruth Hudson	Norman Leavitt	Gina Gillespie

Titles in the public domain.* See cites for copyright renewal dates. Leading lady roles**
