= Too Late for Tears =

1949 film by Byron Haskin

- Theatrical release poster
- Directed by: Byron Haskin
- Screenplay by: Roy Huggins
- Based on: Too Late for Tears by Roy Huggins
- Produced by: Hunt Stromberg
- Starring: Lizabeth Scott; Don DeFore; Dan Duryea; Arthur Kennedy; Kristine Miller
- Cinematography: William C. Mellor
- Edited by: Harry Keller
- Music by: R. Dale Butts
- Production company: Hunt Stromberg Productions
- Distributed by: United Artists
- Release date: July 3, 1949
- Running time: 100 minutes
- Country: United States
- Language: English

Too Late for Tears (1949) by Byron Haskin

Too Late for Tears is a 1949 American film noir starring Lizabeth Scott, Don DeFore, and Dan Duryea. Directed by Byron Haskin, its plot follows a ruthless woman who resorts to multiple murders in an attempt to retain a suitcase containing US$60,000 (Note: This is an amount roughly equivalent to $812,000 in 2025, according to calculations based on the consumer price index measure of inflation.) that does not belong to her. The screenplay was written by Roy Huggins, developed from a serial he wrote for The Saturday Evening Post. Arthur Kennedy, Kristine Miller, and Barry Kelley appear in support.

Originally released by United Artists in the summer of 1949, the film was reissued under the alternate title Killer Bait in 1955. It received mixed reviews from critics. The film was a box-office bomb, and its financial failure resulted in the film's producer, Hunt Stromberg, filing bankruptcy. In the years since its release, it has been noted for featuring one of Scott's strongest performances, and her character one of the most vicious femmes fatales in film noir.

Too Late for Tears has long been in the public domain and available in varying cuts. In 2015, the UCLA Film and Television Archive and Film Noir Foundation undertook extensive restoration of the film, combining elements sourced from France with additional material from the surviving 35 and 16 mm prints. The restored version of the film was released in 2016 on Blu-ray by Flicker Alley in the United States and Arrow Films in the United Kingdom. The film has developed a cult following in the years since its release.

== Plot ==
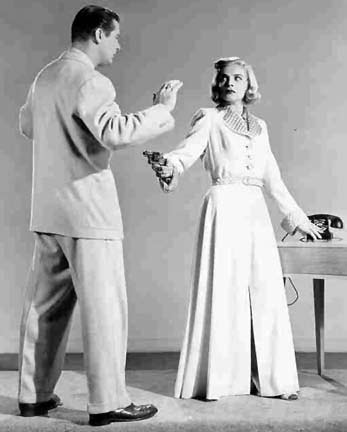
Don DeFore and Lizabeth Scott

Los Angeles couple Jane and Alan Palmer are returning from a party when the driver in an oncoming car tosses a bag of cash into their car. The Palmers elude another car that pursues them, and in a compromise between Jane wanting to keep the money and Alan wanting to contact police, they agree to check the bag at Union Station. When Alan is at work, a man named Danny Fuller comes to the Palmer apartment and tells Jane the money was intended for him. Jane says the money is not there and proposes to split it.

Alan decides to turn the bag over to authorities, and Jane devises a plan to kill him. Jane suggests Alan and she take a pedal boat ride at MacArthur Park and tells Fuller to meet her there. After killing Alan, Fuller and she sink the body. Jane next attempts to kill Fuller, but he escapes. Jane devises a scheme to appear that Alan ran off to Mexico with the money by reporting him missing. Alan’s sister Kathy, who lives in the apartment next to the Palmers, becomes suspicious and finds the bag’s claim ticket.

Don Blake, claiming to be Alan’s war buddy, arrives to help find him. Don and Kathy are attracted to each other. Jane discovers Kathy has the claim ticket and pressures Fuller to buy poison to kill her. Jane unmasks Don as an impostor, knocks him out, and retrieves the claim ticket. Jane retrieves the bag and Fuller tells her the money is his payment to remain silent over an insurance scam. Jane tricks him into fatally drinking the poison intended for Kathy. Jane escapes with the money to Mexico. Don tracks Jane to her hotel room and blackmails her into confessing she killed Alan. Don reveals he is really the brother of Jane’s first husband, whom he suspects she murdered, too. Mexican police breach the room, and cornered, Jane accidentally falls to her death from the balcony. Don returns to the hotel lobby where Kathy and he, now married, decide to end their honeymoon early and return to the United States.

== Cast ==
- Lizabeth Scott as Jane Palmer
- Don DeFore as Don Blake/Blanchard
- Dan Duryea as Danny Fuller
- Arthur Kennedy as Alan Palmer
- Kristine Miller as Kathy Palmer
- Barry Kelley as Lieutenant Breach
- Denver Pyle as Youth at Union Station (uncredited)

== Production ==
=== Development ===
The film was adapted for the screen by Roy Huggins, based on his own serialized novel of the same name, which had been published by The Saturday Evening Post. The film's producer, Hunt Stromberg, had a successful film career working for Metro-Goldwyn-Mayer, had left the studio and began producing independent films.

=== Casting ===
Stromberg initially sought Joan Crawford for the lead role of Jane Palmer, Kirk Douglas as Danny Fuller, and Wendell Corey as Don Blake. Instead, Hal B. Wallis, with whom Lizabeth Scott was under contract, lent her out for the project at the request of director Byron Haskin, who had previously directed Scott in I Walk Alone (1947). Don DeFore and Dan Duryea were ultimately cast as Don and Danny, respectively.

== Release ==
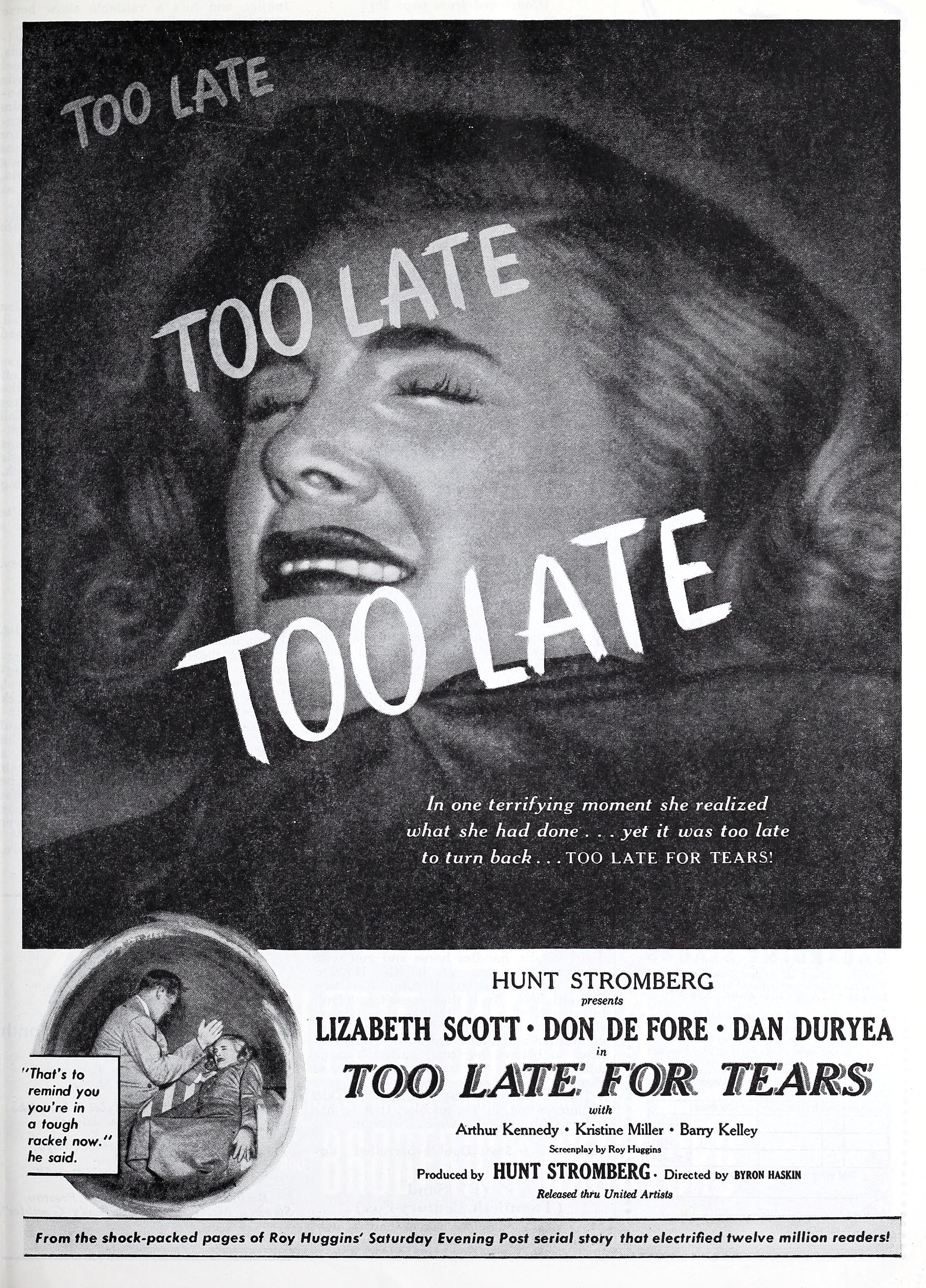
Promotional advertisement from Photoplay, 1949

Too Late for Tears was distributed by United Artists, opening regionally in Arkansas and Kentucky on July 3, 1949. The film opened in Los Angeles on July 13, 1949.

It was re-released in August 1955 under the alternate title Killer Bait by Astor Pictures, a distributor that specialized in theatrical reissuing of films. Astor Pictures often paired the film as a double feature with Johnny Holiday (1948), which was reissued under the alternative title Boy's Prison.

=== Box office ===
Too Late for Tears was a box-office bomb at the time of its release, sending its producer into bankruptcy.

=== Critical response ===
Upon its original release, Too Late for Tears received mixed reviews from critics. A. H. Weiler of The New York Times wrote:

If proof be needed at this point that money is the root of all evil—a theme, incidentally, which has been the root of more than one motion picture—then Too Late for Tears, which came to the Mayfair on Saturday, is proof positive. For producer Hunt Stromberg, director Byron Haskin, and scenarist Roy Huggins, who adapted his own Saturday Evening Post serial, herein have fashioned an effective melodramatic elaboration of that theme. Despite an involved plot and an occasional overabundance of palaver, not all of which is bright, this yarn about a cash-hungry dame who doesn't let men or conscience stand in her way, is an adult and generally suspenseful adventure.

Philip K. Scheuer of the Los Angeles Times conceded that Scott "gives the role everything she does have with a growling, unvarying intensity," but felt that overall the film was "a routine specimen of crime melodrama." A review published by the Spokane Chronicle described the film as "dramatic and tragic" and "an action-packed film which has its good moments." Alternately, a reviewer for the Detroit Free Press was unimpressed by Scott's performance, writing: "She produces a characterization which is without explanation or belief... Miss Scott appears terribly tired in the film. Her acting has the same quality. All of which leaves what should have been an exciting movie in a somewhat rundown condition."

Film critic Dennis Schwartz in 2005 wrote a favorable review:

Byron Haskin's low-budget film noir makes good use of its Los Angeles locale and its lady bluebeard is fun to watch as she does her nasty gun thing with her nice guy hubby and rotten poison thing with her boyfriend (she took care of her first hubby off camera, so we're not sure how he got it!)...Though a minor film noir, it relates to the ambitions the middle-class had during the postwar period to better their life materially and socially. Jane's drive for wealth was so extreme that she will not stop at murder to rise above her impoverished middle-class circumstances, and her warped character is used to show how money can't buy one happiness. The husky-voiced winsome smiling Lizabeth Scott turns in a finely tuned performance as the femme fatale; while Dan Duryea is in his element as the alcoholic weak-kneed cad, who shows he doesn't have as much stomach for his criminal mischief as does his lady accomplice.

As of May 2023, the film holds a 100% approval rating on the review aggregator Rotten Tomatoes, based on five critical reviews.

=== Restoration ===
Too Late for Tears fell in the public domain in the decades after its release, owing to the dissolution of its corporate holders, which failed to renew its copyright. The original camera negatives were subsequently lost. It has been released on VHS and DVD by numerous distribution companies.

The Film Noir Foundation, dedicated to preserving films noir, had sought to restore the film since its inception in 2006, but were unable to locate quality prints. In 2011, Eddie Muller, a film scholar and president of the foundation, received anonymous correspondence regarding a 35 mm print of the film that had allegedly been sold to a collector on the East Coast. Muller tracked the print to a collector in Baltimore, who claimed the print had been kept in storage, but the collector died before he was able to negotiate a sale or disclose its location.

After a 35 mm print dupe negative was located in France, the UCLA Film and Television Archive and the Film Noir Foundation began undertaking the restoration process, with the Hollywood Foreign Press Association, providing additional funding. The restoration entailed the use of both the French 35 mm print (bearing the French-language title, Le Tigresse), as well as an American 35 mm print from 1955, when the film was re-released bearing the alternate title Killer Bait. Because of this, the film's original English-language opening title had to be reconstructed via rotoscoping and matching the fonts as they appeared on an inferior 16 mm print of the film. The film's closing titles also had to be reconstructed using the same method.

On January 25, 2014, the restored 35 mm print was premiered by the Film Noir Foundation at Noir City 12 at the Castro Theatre in San Francisco. The restored print of the film was released in a DVD and Blu-ray set by Flicker Alley in May 2016. The following month, British distributor Arrow Films released the restored print in a DVD and Blu-ray set through their Arrow Academy label.

== Legacy ==
Scott's performance in the film is regarded by several critics as among her best work. Her femme fatale character in the film has been noted as one of the most merciless and avaricious in film noir and marked a departure from her previous performances in Pitfall (1948), which featured elements of character vulnerability. Film scholar Fabio Vighi notes in Critical Theory and Film: Rethinking Ideology Through Film Noir, "Like few other femmes, she appears unstoppable, ready to do anything to achieve her object."

Interviewed in 2001, Scott commented on the role: "Obviously, there was a softness and an inordinate amount of feminine qualities in [the character]... When a woman like this is corrupted, she would surrender to that corruption. Money would become her delight and her total obsession, and she would then kill for it."

Too Late for Tears has developed a cult following in the decades since its original release. Todd Weiner of the UCLA Film & Television Archive wrote upon the film's 2016 Blu-ray release: "Modern audiences now recognize it as a darkly satisfying and atmospheric meditation on the covetous societal and materialistic ambitions of postwar middle-class America." Film critic and writer Eddie Muller cites the film as "The best un-known American film noir of the classic era."

== See also ==
- List of films in the public domain in the United States
