= Byron Haskin =

American film and television director (1899–1984)

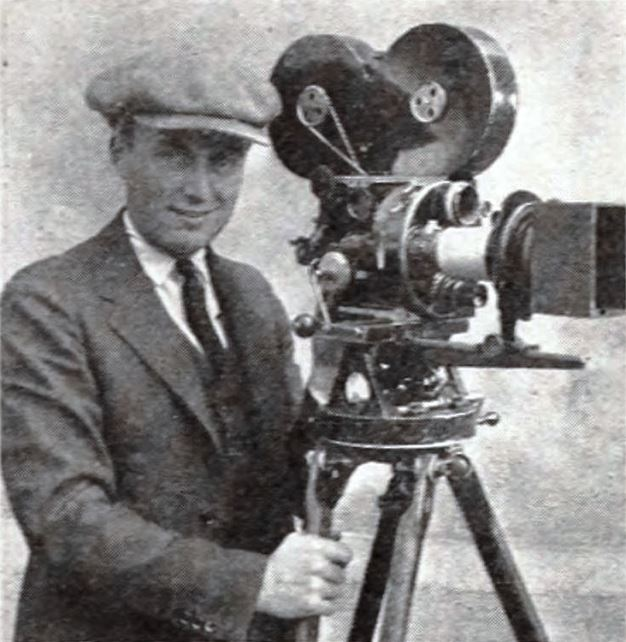
- Haskin in 1922
- Born: Byron Conrad Haskin; April 22, 1899; Portland, Oregon, U.S.
- Died: April 16, 1984 (aged 84); Montecito, California, U.S.
- Occupations: Film director, television director, cinematographer, producer, special effects artist
- Years active: 1922–1968
- Spouse: Terry Gates
- Children: 1
- Relatives: Joe Flynn (son-in-law)

Byron Conrad Haskin (April 22, 1899 – April 16, 1984) was an American film and television director, special effects creator and cinematographer. He is best known for directing The War of the Worlds (1953), one of many films where he teamed with producer George Pal.

== Career ==
Haskin was born in Portland, Oregon, where his father was employed as a schoolteacher. Both Haskins' mother and father were natives of California. Haskin was raised primarily in San Francisco.

Byron served in the U.S. Naval Reserve Force during World War I. He graduated from the University of California. He went out to Hollywood in 1917 and became the apprentice of cameraman H. Lyman Broening. He was hired as the cinematographer in 1922 for Hurricane's Gal. In his early career, he was also a special effects artist, with a number of credits on Warner Bros. films, eventually becoming the head of the studio's special effects department (1937–1945). During his tenure there, he earned four Oscar nominations for his effects work, all shared with Nathan Levinson:

- The Private Lives of Elizabeth and Essex (1939)
- The Sea Hawk (1940)
- The Sea Wolf (1941)
- Desperate Journey (1942)

In 1938, he and the Warner Bros. special effects department were awarded an Academy Award for Technical Achievement for developing a rear-projection system useful in effects photography.

In the late 1940s, he returned to directing, having directed four films in 1927. He helmed two film-noir thrillers: I Walk Alone (1947), starring Burt Lancaster, Lizabeth Scott and Kirk Douglas, and Too Late for Tears (1949), starring Lizabeth Scott. Hal B. Wallis had previously sent the then-unknown Lancaster to audition for Haskin; this led to him being signed by Wallis and cast as the male lead in The Killers (1946), the role which made him a star. Amongst Haskin's other prominent films as director was Treasure Island (1950), one of Walt Disney's earliest live-action features. Following The War of the Worlds, he continued his collaboration with George Pal with The Naked Jungle (1954), Conquest of Space (1955), and The Power (1968). His other significant film is the science fiction adventure Robinson Crusoe on Mars (1964).

Haskin also worked as a cinematographer and producer, as well as an occasional visual effects artist, notably doing the animation of photos of ships patterned after the Martian ships in War of the Worlds for his later film Robinson Crusoe on Mars. While not science-fiction, but important for the special effects, he directed the treasure-hunt thriller September Storm, one of the only films produced in Stereo-Vision, a short-lived process which combined widescreen, similar to CinemaScope or Panavision, and 3D, one of the first to do so with underwater sequences.

His career in television included directing six episodes of The Outer Limits (1963–65), including the episodes "The Architects of Fear" (1963) and "Demon with a Glass Hand" (1964). He also co-produced the original Star Trek pilot episode, "The Cage" (1965). He retired in 1968.

Haskin appeared as an interviewee in a documentary series Hollywood (1980), about the silent film era, which was co-produced by Kevin Brownlow.

Haskin died of lung cancer in Montecito, California, six days before his 85th birthday.

== Personal life ==
Haskin was married twice. He was survived by his second wife, the former Terry Gates; and a daughter from his first marriage, Shirley Flynn. His daughter married actor Joe Flynn.

== Selected filmography ==
=== Cinematographer ===
- Hurricane's Gal (1922)
- The World's a Stage (1922)
- On Thin Ice (1925)
- Bobbed Hair (1925)
- Where the Worst Begins (1925)
- The Sea Beast (1926)
- Don Juan (1926)
- Wolf's Clothing (1927)
- When a Man Loves (1927)
- On Trial (1928)
- The Redeeming Sin (1928)
- Glad Rag Doll (1929)
- Madonna of Avenue A (1929)
- Black Fury (1935)

=== Director ===
Complete listing.

- Matinee Ladies (1927)
- Irish Hearts (1927)
- Ginsberg the Great (1927)
- The Siren (1927)
- Action in the North Atlantic (1943) (uncredited)
- I Walk Alone (1947)
- Man-Eater of Kumaon (1948)
- Too Late for Tears (1949)
- Treasure Island (1950)
- Tarzan's Peril (1951)
- Warpath (1951)
- Silver City (1951)
- Denver and Rio Grande (1952)
- The War of the Worlds (1953)
- His Majesty O'Keefe (1954)
- The Naked Jungle (1954)
- Long John Silver (1954)
- Conquest of Space (1955)
- The First Texan (1956)
- The Boss (1956)
- From the Earth to the Moon (1958)
- The Little Savage (1959)
- Jet Over the Atlantic (1959)
- September Storm (1960)
- Armored Command (1961)
- Captain Sindbad (1963)
- Robinson Crusoe on Mars (1964)
- The Power (1968)

=== Special effects ===
- A Midsummer Night's Dream (1935)
- Dodge City (1939)
- The Private Lives of Elizabeth and Essex (1939)
- The Roaring Twenties (1939)
- The Sea Hawk (1940)
- They Drive by Night (1940)
- Knute Rockne, All American (1940)
- Santa Fe Trail (1940)
- High Sierra (1941)
- The Sea Wolf (1941)
- The Bride Came C.O.D. (1941)
- Captains of the Clouds (1942)
- Across the Pacific (1942)
- Passage to Marseille (1944)
- Arsenic and Old Lace (1944)
- Robinson Crusoe on Mars (1964)

== Sources ==
- Haskin, Byron; Adams, Joe (1984). An Interview with Byron Haskin. Directors Guild of America. ISBN 978-0-810-81740-1.
