= Jungle Patrol (1948 film) =

1948 film by Joseph M. Newman

- Theatrical release poster
- Directed by: Joseph M. Newman
- Screenplay by: Francis Swann; Robertson White
- Story by: William Bowers
- Based on: West of Tomorrow (play) by William Bowers
- Produced by: Frank N. Seltzer
- Starring: Kristine Miller; Arthur Franz; Ross Ford; Tommy Noonan; Gene Reynolds; Richard Jaeckel
- Cinematography: Mack Stengler
- Edited by: Bert Jordan
- Music by: Arthur Lange; Emil Newman
- Production company: 20th Century Fox
- Distributed by: 20th Century Fox
- Release date: September 24, 1948
- Running time: 71 minutes
- Country: United States
- Language: English
- Budget: $125,000

Jungle Patrol (aka West of Tomorrow) is a 1948 American drama film directed by Joseph M. Newman and written by Francis Swann and Robertson White. The film stars Kristine Miller, Arthur Franz, Ross Ford, Tommy Noonan, Gene Reynolds and Richard Jaeckel. The film was released on September 24, 1948, by 20th Century Fox. Jungle Patrol was set in World War II and was based on William Bowers' play West of Tomorrow.

== Plot ==
In 1942, eight United States Army Air Forces fighter pilots flying P-40 fighter aircraft and a support crew defend a remote airfield under construction in New Guinea. Waves of Japanese attacks threaten the air base, and ultimately will lead to attacks on Australia. Spirits are raised when Jean Gillis, an attractive USO entertainer, flies in on a supply aircraft from Brisbane, the first of a group of five entertainers coming to do a show for the troops.

Jean gets to know the pilots, and some of them tell her about their wives and sweethearts and their hopes for postwar life. Each day as they fly out, the pilots seem to be cheating death. The group has scored 100 victories without losing a man. One of the group recalls the 1934 film Death Takes a Holiday, where Death takes a few days off from extinguishing lives in order to explore human nature, and wonders if it is happening to them.

During an attack on Japanese aircraft, as Jean listens to a radio monitoring their conversations, one pilot's aircraft catches fire but the flames are mysteriously extinguished. Later, Jean finds a "scoreboard" detailing their missions, but when she displays it prominently, the men are uneasy. Maj. Wright, known affectionately as "Skipper," then receives a message that the rest of Jean's troupe is grounded, so she volunteers to do a solo show, after which she dances with several of the pilots.

Lt. "Mace" Willard tells Jean that he saw her before in an anti-war play in New York. She reveals that her husband was killed at Dunkirk. After the eight fliers host a meager dinner for Jean, the skipper escorts Jean to her tent; they are attracted to each other. The next morning there is a "scramble" and most of the pilots take off, leaving Mace on ground control.

After Jean learns that an aircraft is coming for her that afternoon, the skipper leaves to join his pilots. They all come under heavy attack and two of them are killed. Mace joins the others in the air, but all are shot down, including the skipper, who manages to land safely. Mace is trapped by Japanese fighters and is killed as they inflict great damage on the island. The skipper and Jean reunite to face whatever the future may bring.

== Cast ==
- Kristine Miller as Jean Gillis
- Arthur Franz as Lt. "Mace" Willard (Note: Jungle Patrol marked the film debut of actor Arthur Franz.)
- Ross Ford as Maj. Skipper Wright
- Tommy Noonan as Lt. "Ham" Hamilton
- Gene Reynolds as Lt. Marion Minor
- Richard Jaeckel as Lt. Dick Carter
- Mickey Knox as Lt. Louie Rasti
- Harry Lauter as Lt. Derby
- William Murphy as Lt. Johnny Murphy
- G. Pat Collins as Sgt. Hanley

== Production ==
Several Curtiss P-40N Warhawk fighters were hired for Jungle Patrol. Other aerial sequences used stock footage and scale model work. The film's working title was "West of Tomorrow".

== Reception ==
Jungle Patrol had its world premiere on September 24, 1948, at a national convention of the Air Force Association, held at the Hotel Commodore in New York. Reviewers commented on the film's "unusual, and economical, use of offscreen voices, heard on a radio intercom, to depict all of the battle sequences."
