= Doreen Lang =

New Zealand-born American actress (1915–1999)

- Lang in North by Northwest (1959)
- Born: February 15, 1915; Gisborne, New Zealand
- Died: April 21, 1999 (aged 84); Malibu, California, U.S.
- Occupation: Actress
- Years active: 1941–1996
- Spouse(s): Richard B. Rudy (m. 1939; div. 1956) Arthur Franz (m. 1964)
- Children: 1

Doreen Lang (February 15, 1915 – April 21, 1999) was a New Zealand-born American character actress, remembered for roles in theatre, television and films.

== Life and career ==
Lang was born in Gisborne, New Zealand, and studied drama in London.

She played Edith in Noël Coward's Blithe Spirit on Broadway from 1941 to 1943. Other Broadway shows included Make Way for Lucia (1948), I Know My Love (1949), Season in the Sun (1950) and Faithfully Yours (1951).

Lang's live TV performances included the title role in The Story of Mary Surrat (1955) for Kraft Television Theatre; among her other television appearances were episodes of Studio One from 1954 to 1957 and the daytime drama The Nurses (1965). Later, she appeared as a guest star on numerous TV dramas, such as Hawaii Five-O (1968), Mod Squad (1969), Gunsmoke (1970), Mannix (1971) and The Waltons (1973) and Kung Fu (1974).

Her first film role was in Hitchcock's The Wrong Man (1956), followed by an episode of Alfred Hitchcock Presents (1958), and roles in North by Northwest (1959) and The Birds (1963). Her other films included Wild in the Country (1961), The Cabinet of Caligari (1962), The Group (1966), Brian's Song (1971), A Death of Innocence (1971), Death Sentence (1974), Death In Canaan (1978), Like Normal People (1979) and Almost an Angel (1990).

Lang was married to Richard B. Rudy from 1939 to 1956, with whom she had a daughter, and, after a divorce, to Arthur Franz from 1964, with whom she had three stepchildren.

She died in Malibu, California, at the age of 84 after a long battle with cancer.

== Selected filmography ==
- The Wrong Man (1956) as Ann James
- Alfred Hitchcock Presents (1958) (Season 3 Episode 35: "Dip in the Pool") as Emily
- North by Northwest (1959) as Maggie (uncredited)
- The Birds (1963) as Hysterical Mother in Diner

== Sources ==
- Gaye, Freda, ed. (1967). Who's Who in the Theatre (fourteenth ed.). London: Sir Isaac Pitman and Sons. OCLC 5997224.
