= Shadow on the Wall (1950 film) =

1950 film by Pat Jackson

- theatrical release poster
- Directed by: Patrick Jackson
- Screenplay by: William Ludwig
- Based on: the story Death in the Doll's House; 1943 novel by Hannah Lees and Lawrence P. Bachmann
- Produced by: Robert Sisk
- Starring: Ann Sothern; Zachary Scott; Gigi Perreau; Nancy Davis; Kristine Miller; John McIntire
- Cinematography: Ray June
- Edited by: Irvine Warburton
- Music by: André Previn
- Production company: Metro-Goldwyn-Mayer
- Distributed by: Loew's Inc.
- Release date: May 19, 1950 (US)
- Running time: 84 minutes
- Country: United States
- Language: English
- Budget: $701,000
- Box office: $769,000

Shadow on the Wall is a 1950 American psychological thriller film directed by Patrick Jackson and starring Ann Sothern, Zachary Scott and Gigi Perreau and featuring Nancy Davis. It is based on the 1943 story Death in the Doll's House by Hannah Lees and Lawrence P. Bachmann.

== Plot ==
David Stirrling returns from a business trip with gifts for his six-year-old daughter Susan, and for his wife, Susan's step-mother, Celia. He also has some World War II souvenirs, including a handgun. Celia is not there when David arrives, she's with Crane Weymouth, with whom she is having an affair. Crane is the fiancé of Celia's sister, Dell Faring. David sees her getting out of Crane's car, so he realizes that her story of seeing a matinee with a girl friend is untrue.

Crane and Dell come to dinner that night, and afterwards David tricks Crane into revealing that he and Celia had been together that afternoon. Dell, who believed that Crane was at a business meeting, makes an excuse to leave, and Crane leaves with her. After they leave, Celia and David have an argument, during which David takes out from his suitcase the souvenir gun in order to put it in his desk. Celia tells him to lock it up in the study, and he is leaving to do so when he discovers Crane's monogrammed handkerchief in the pocket of his robe. He approaches Celia to confront her with the evidence of her infidelity, but Celia thinks he is threatening her with the gun and hits him with a hand mirror, knocking him unconscious.

Dell arrives and assures Celia that David is still alive. Celia tells Dell to pick up the gun and take it away. Dell and Celia then have an argument: Crane has told her about the affair, and resentment that already existed between the sisters flares because Dell feels this was not the first time Celia had selfishly taken something from her. Incensed, she shoots and kills Celia. Backing away towards the door, she throws a distinctive shadow on the wall of the bedroom. She throws the gun on the floor and flees. Just then, David gets up, but falls down again, and the child Susan starts to scream.

With no memory of what has happened, David can only assume he was the one who shot Celia, so when he is tried for first degree murder, he accepts a jury's verdict of guilt and the judge's sentence that he be put to death.

Afterwards, Dell writes out a confession, and takes it with her to an appointment at the hairdressers. As the hairdryer is put over her head, she imagines that it's the cap of the electric chair. and panics. She tears up the confession.

Susan has repressed memory of what she saw, but is haunted by the image of the shadow on the wall. She is now living in a psychiatric hospital, where psychiatrist Caroline Canford is convinced she can cure the girl. Based on what the girl said during play therapy, Canford believes that Susan saw her father kill her stepmother, which she tells Dell. In the hope of unlocking Susan's memory, Canford brings Susan to see her father in prison, but it does not help.

Canford continues to use play therapy to probe Susan's memory, and finds out that Susan screamed not because of the gunshot, or the sight of her father and stepmother falling down, but because she saw something frightening in the doorway. She is on the verge of finding out what she might have seen when Dell, who has been watching from behind a one-way mirror, contrives to make a loud noise which interrupts the session. Later, Susan draws for Canford a picture of the shadow which haunts her, which resembles a doll she calls "Cupid". When Canford shows Susan the doll, she becomes agitated and asks to stop playing.

Dell, realizing that Canford is getting close to restoring the girl's memory, attempts to murder the child with poison and by drowning. When she fails, she adopts Susan instead and intends to remove her from the hospital and from Canford's care. Stymied, Canford brings Susan to the Stirrling apartment to recreate the night of the killing. When Susan enters the room during the recreation, she is totally focused not on the adults playing her parents, but on the open doorway. To Canford, this means that there must have been a third person in the room.

Canford and David's lawyer and best friend, Pike Ludwell, drive Susan to Dell's house in Connecticut. As they are leaving, Dell turns on the outside lights so they can see their way to the car. Susan begs them not to leave, but as they drive off, Susan turns around and sees Dell's shadow on the wall of the house. She cries out "Cupid, Cupid" and screams. Canford returns and Susan tells her that Dell is "Cupid," after which Dell confesses to Pike.

== Cast ==
- Ann Sothern as Dell Faring
- Zachary Scott as David I. Starrling
- Gigi Perreau as Susan Starrling
- Nancy Davis as Dr. Caroline Canford
- Kristine Miller as Celia Starrling
- John McIntire as Pike Ludwell
- Tom Helmore as Crane Weymouth
- Helen Brown as Miss Burke
- Barbara Billingsley as Olga
- Marcia Van Dyke as Secretary
- Anthony Sydes as Bobby
- Jimmy Hunt as Boy

== Production ==
The story Death in the Doll's House by Hannah Lees and Lawrence P. Bachmann, upon which the film was based, was first published as a serial in The Saturday Evening Post from January 16, 1943 to February 27, 1943. "Hannah Lees" was a pseudonym used by author Elizabeth Head Fetter. Bachmann had previously written stories and screenplays for medical dramas released by MGM which featured Dr. Kildare and Dr. Gillespie.

Because of the sleeper success of RKO's The Window, which told the story of a young boy who tries to convince others that he's seen a murder, MGM rushed Shadow on the Wall into production. It had the working titles "Death in a Doll's House", "Death in the Doll's House" and "The Open Door". Roy Rowland was originally slated to direct the film, but was replaced by British director Patrick Jackson for what was to be his only American film; Jackson was primarily known in the UK as a documentarian.

Margaret O'Brien was originally set to star as the girl, Susan. Three of the film's cast were borrowed from other studios: Zachary Scott from Warner Bros., Gigi Perreau from Samuel Goldwyn and Kristine Miller from Paramount Pictures.

At the time of production, eight-year-old Gigi Perreau had already appeared in 20 films. After a couple of small roles in MGM films, this was the first substantial featured role in a movie for Nancy Davis.

Shadow on the Wall was in production from April 11, 1949 to mid-May of that year. It was released a year later, on May 19, 1950.

== Reception ==
=== Box office ===
According to MGM records, the film earned $433,000 in the US and Canada and $192,000 elsewhere, resulting in a loss of $330,000.

=== Critical response ===
When the film was first released, The New York Times praised the acting, writing "Nancy Davis is beautiful and convincing as the serious psychiatrist who uses affection and play therapy to delve into the youngster's mind for the evidence needed for both a cure and the eventual exposure of the criminal. Gigi Perreau is excellent as the mentally tortured moppet, and Zachary Scott does a realistic job as her architect father and wrongly convicted murderer. Kristine Miller is competent in the brief role of the victim, but Ann Sothern, who turns in a polished portrayal, seems out of character as the worried villainess of the piece. List Shadow on the Wall as obvious but interesting fare."

Reviewing the film in 2000, film critic Dennis Schwartz wrote: "A taut suspense yarn in B&W, that plays like film noir...This villain role is out of character for the always sweet Ann Sothern, but she shows great agility in handling the difficult role. The melodramatic script was often not believable and the action part of the story looked like pretend acting, just like the therapy Nancy Davis was applying to Gigi. But the stars pulled this one together and made the tense story, revolving around the little girl, seem plausible. Gigi Perreau was marvelous, giving a convincing performance as a little girl who could be both adorable and then almost frightened out of her mind."
