= Geraldine (1953 film) =

1953 film by R. G. Springsteen

- Theatrical release poster
- Directed by: R. G. Springsteen
- Screenplay by: Frank Gill Jr. Peter Milne
- Story by: Peter Milne; Doris Gilbert
- Produced by: Sidney Picker
- Starring: John Carroll; Mala Powers; Jim Backus; Stan Freberg; Kristine Miller; Leon Belasco
- Cinematography: John L. Russell
- Edited by: Tony Martinelli
- Music by: R. Dale Butts
- Production company: Republic Pictures
- Distributed by: Republic Pictures
- Release date: December 16, 1953
- Running time: 90 minutes
- Country: United States
- Language: English

Geraldine is a 1953 American comedy film directed by R. G. Springsteen and written by Frank Gill Jr. and Peter Milne. The film stars John Carroll, Mala Powers, Jim Backus, Stan Freberg, Kristine Miller and Leon Belasco. The film was released on December 16, 1953 by Republic Pictures.

== Cast ==
- John Carroll as Grant Sanborn
- Mala Powers as Janey Edwards
- Jim Backus as Jason Ambrose
- Stan Freberg as Billy Weber
- Kristine Miller as Ellen Blake
- Leon Belasco as Professor Dubois
- Ludwig Stössel as Professor Berger
- Earl Lee as Professor Palmer
- Alan Reed as Frederick Sterling
- Nana Bryant as Dean Blake
- Carolyn Jones as Kitty
