= Lizabeth (album) =

Studio album by Lizabeth Scott
- Released: 1958
- Recorded: October 28–30, 1957
- Label: Vik Records
- Producer: Herman Diaz, Jr.

Lizabeth is a studio album by American actress and singer Lizabeth Scott, released in 1958 by the RCA Victor subsidiary label Vik Records. It features Henri René as arranger and conductor.

== Background ==
The album's liner notes were written by columnist Earl Wilson, who interviewed Lizabeth Scott. Wilson wrote that the actress "played in about six movies in which she was allegedly a singer," but the studio always hired another singer to dub her voice. Scott told Wilson:

Every actress is a frustrated singer. For years I wanted to sing. And I even said, "I going to start taking singing lessons." But do you know what the studio said? They said, "You're out of your mind. You're an actress, not a singer. Don't bother with singing lessons!"

Scott spent two-and-a-half years studying singing with Hollywood voice teachers Harriet Lee and Lillian Rosendale Goodman. She then made a demo and played it for the studio executives to convince them that she could sing. They "liked it" and Scott was given the opportunity to record the album; it was "a satisfaction as important [to her] as her success in You Came Along and The Strange Love of Martha Ivers, her first pictures."

== Critical reception ==
Professional ratings
Review scores
Source	Rating
AllMusic	3.5/5 stars
Billboard	2/4 stars

In 1958, Billboard gave the album a positive review: "Movie actress Lizabeth Scott makes her recording debut on the [Vik] label with pleasant, throaty interpretations of a group of standards, and some new tunes including special material like 'Men,' and 'He Is a Man.' The cover is outstanding." The magazine also rated the album's sale potential in its two-out-of-four stars category, which meant "moderate potential—salable qualities".

Jason Ankeny of AllMusic gave it a mixed review, writing, "Scott is an intriguing singer with style and sophistication in spades, but the over the top carnality is simply too much to take in large doses."

=== Accolade ===
On May 5, 1958, the album won Billboard's "Album Cover of the Week" award. "Excellent color photo of movie star Lizabeth Scott makes an attractive cover," Billboard wrote. "It should cause second glances and spark buys."

== Track listing ==
=== Side one ===
1. "Can't Get Out of This Mood" (Frank Loesser, Jimmy McHugh) – 2:15
2. "Men" (Frank Whitfield, George Wyle) – 2:00
3. "I'm in Love Again" (Cole Porter) – 2:30
4. "He Is a Man" (Carroll Coates, Ronnie Selby) – 2:45
5. "Legalize My Name" (Harold Arlen, Johnny Mercer) – 2:40
6. "It's So Nice to Have a Man Around the House" (Jack Elliott, Harold Spina) – 2:43

=== Side two ===
1. "He's Funny That Way" (Richard Whiting, Neil Moret) – 2:55
2. "A Deep Dark Secret" (Marilyn and Joe Hooven) – 2:04
3. "Lucky" (Patrick Welch, Michael Merlo) – 2:58
4. "When a Woman Loves a Man" (Johnny Mercer, Bernie Hanighen, Gordon Jenkins) – 2:55
5. "Willow Weep for Me" (Ann Ronell) – 2:30
6. "How Did He Look?" (Gladys Shelley, Abner Silver) – 2:35

== Personnel ==
- Lizabeth Scott – vocals
- George Wyle – arranger
- Henri René – arranger, conductor
- Herman Diaz Jr. – producer, director
