= I Walk Alone =

1947 film

- Original film poster
- Directed by: Byron Haskin
- Screenplay by: Charles Schnee; Robert Smith (adaptation); John Bright (adaptation)
- Based on: Beggars Are Coming to Town; 1945 play by Theodore Reeves
- Produced by: Hal B. Wallis
- Starring: Burt Lancaster; Lizabeth Scott; Kirk Douglas; Wendell Corey
- Cinematography: Leo Tover
- Edited by: Arthur P. Schmidt
- Music by: Victor Young
- Production company: Hal Wallis Productions
- Distributed by: Paramount Pictures
- Release date: December 31, 1947 (United States)
- Running time: 97 minutes
- Country: United States
- Language: English
- Box office: $2.1 million (US rentals)

I Walk Alone is a 1947 film noir released by Paramount Pictures starring Burt Lancaster and Lizabeth Scott, with a supporting cast featuring Wendell Corey, Kirk Douglas, and Kristine Miller. The film was produced by Hal B. Wallis, and directed by Byron Haskin.

== Plot ==
Frankie Madison and Noll "Dink" Turner were bootlegging partners during Prohibition. They were involved in a shootout with thieves attempting to hijack their liquor, attracting the attention of the police. Frankie and Noll parted ways with an agreement that if one of them should be caught he will still receive an equal share of their combined business after serving his prison sentence. Noll escapes cleanly but Frankie ends up getting 14 years. When he is set free, he goes straight to Noll - who never even once came to visit him - to settle up.

Noll now runs a swanky nightclub, the Regency. When Frankie goes there, Noll stalls, fobbing him off to dinner with his sultry girlfriend, singer Kay Lawrence. Instructed to draw out what Frankie is after, she learns that he merely expects Noll to honor their old bargain. Noll explains to Frankie that their deal only applied to their former nightclub, which he had closed years earlier. Dave, Noll's bookkeeper and a partner in another business the trio had run, is the only one whom Frankie had trusted. Unwisely it turns out, as Dave had gotten him to sign legal papers while in prison without reading them, leaving him swindled with no legal grounds to challenge Noll's doublecross.

Noll informs Frankie that his share of their defunct club is not even worth $3,000. Tearing up Noll's check, Frankie slugs him and leaves to recruit henchmen to take by force what he has been cheated out of. Returning, he is confused by Dave's explanation of how Noll had him divide ownership of the nightclub between a tangle of three interrelated corporations; Their bylaws were set up to prevent Noll from surrendering anything meaningful. Frankie seeks to press his hand, but his goons actually work for Noll. Noll has them give Frankie a severe beating, then dump him in an alley outside the club.

Noll informs Kay that he intends to marry wealthy socialite Alexis Richardson in order to ensure the Regency's success among the "carriage trade". Repulsed, and strongly attracted to Frankie, Kay quits and is able to overcome Frankie's bitter suspicions about her.

Dave, aghast at how Frankie has been treated, tells him that he is willing to spill what he knows about the club's crooked books, which will devastate Noll. Brazenly telling Noll what he intends to do, he is promptly murdered by one of Noll's henchmen, which Noll pins on Frankie.

Evading a police manhunt, Frankie and Kay go to Noll's mansion. Noll is waiting with a gun, which Frankie wrests away and takes him to the nightclub. Frankie first collects only the $2900 and change he is owed, then threatens Noll into writing a confession that he ordered Dave's murder. When the police arrive after being summoned by Kay at Frankie's request, Noll turns the tables and the police seek to arrest Frankie. He proves to be unarmed, and convinces them that Noll's confession is legitimate. Noll is arrested, but escapes his escort and heads toward Frankie with a gun. Before he can reach him, he is shot dead by a policeman. Frankie proclaims he never intends to touch a gun again, and he and Kay leave to build a future together.

== Cast ==
- Burt Lancaster as Frankie Madison
- Lizabeth Scott as Kay Lawrence
- Wendell Corey as Dave
- Kirk Douglas as Noll "Dink" Turner
- Kristine Miller as Mrs. Alexis Richardson
- George Rigaud as Maurice
- Marc Lawrence as Nick Palestro
- Mike Mazurki as Dan, the nightclub doorman
- Mickey Knox as Skinner
- Roger Neury as Felix Walter
- Freddie Steele as Tiger Rose

== Production ==
I Walk Alone was adapted from Theodore Reeves's play Beggars Are Coming to Town, whose film rights were acquired by producer Hal B. Wallis shortly before the play opened on Broadway in October 1945. According to Turner Classic Movies, Wallis developed the project for about a year; it was first renamed Deadlock before receiving its final title. The AFI Catalog of Feature Films lists the film's production period as early December 1946 to mid-February 1947.

I Walk Alone was the first of six films that Burt Lancaster and Kirk Douglas made together over the decades, including Gunfight at the O.K. Corral (1957) with Lancaster as Wyatt Earp and Douglas as Doc Holliday, The Devil's Disciple (1959) with Laurence Olivier, The List of Adrian Messenger (1963) with George C. Scott and John Merivale, Seven Days in May (1964) with Fredric March and Ava Gardner, and Tough Guys (1986).

=== Music ===
Lizbeth Scott's vocals on the original song "Don't Call It Love", by Ned Washington and Allie Wrubel, was dubbed by an uncredited Trudy Stevens. The same composing team contributed a song "I'll Walk Alone", heard as an instrumental.

Instrumental versions of "Isn't It Romantic?" and "Heart and Soul", both performed by The Regency Three, are featured as during the dinner scene. Kay requests the first of the trio's leader Jimmy, after Frankie indicates he prefers older songs, one of the building hints that he's been away. Then after dinner Frankie requests the latter, for the couple to dance to.

== Reception ==
In a contemporary review for The New York Times, critic Bosley Crowther wrote: "It's a mighty low class of people that you will meet in the Paramount's 'I Walk Alone'—and a mighty low grade of melodrama, if you want the honest truth—in spite of a very swanky setting and an air of great elegance." Crowther found Kirk Douglas' performance "fairly effective" but panned the other leads: "Burt Lancaster plays the would-be 'muscler' with the blank-faced aplomb of Tarzan. ... Lizabeth Scott has no more personality than a model in the window of a department store."

The Chicago Tribune was not impressed: "A dreary dissertation on the art of the double cross in the gang world, this film inches along through numerous complications, and when the happy lovers finally disappear in the mist, they leave the spectators in a bit of fog....Lavish settings and strenuous work by most members of the cast succeed only in giving the film a complete air of unreality and occasionally producing giggles from the audience with scenes intended to elicit gasps."

James Agee, writing in The Nation, said that the film should be made to "walk alone, tinkle a little bell, and cry, 'Unclean, unclean.'"

Variety called I Walk Alone "a tight, hard-boiled melodrama."

== Restoration ==
A restoration of the film was played at the Noir City festival at the Castro Theatre in February 2018.

== Home video ==
The movie was released on home video for the first time on July 24, 2018.
