= Lizabeth Scott =

American actress and singer (1922–2015)

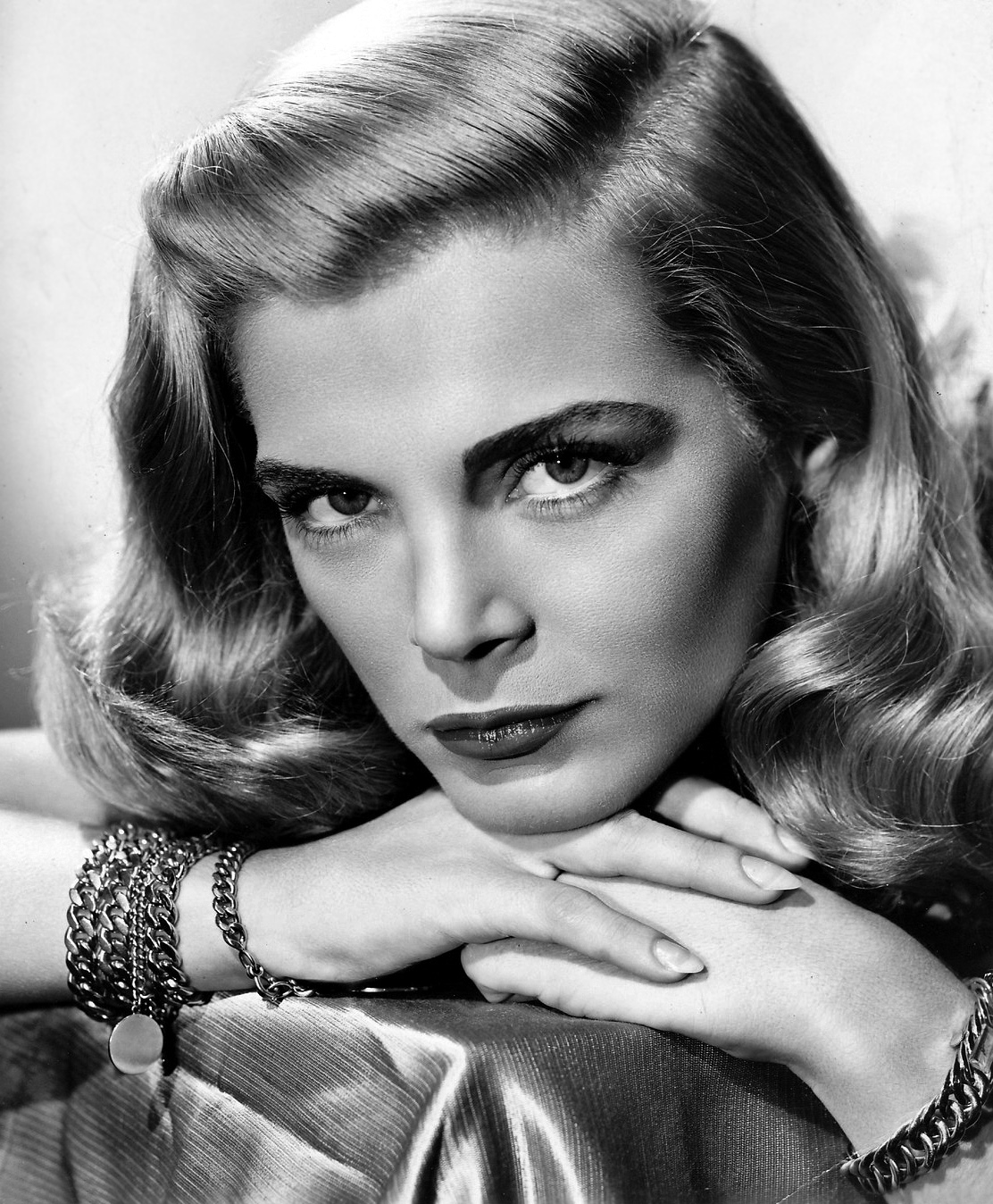
- Scott in 1947
- Born: Emma Virginia Matzo; September 29, 1922; Scranton, Pennsylvania, U.S.
- Died: January 31, 2015 (aged 92); Los Angeles, California, U.S.
- Other name: Elizabeth Scott
- Occupations: Actress; singer; model
- Years active: 1942–1972

Signature
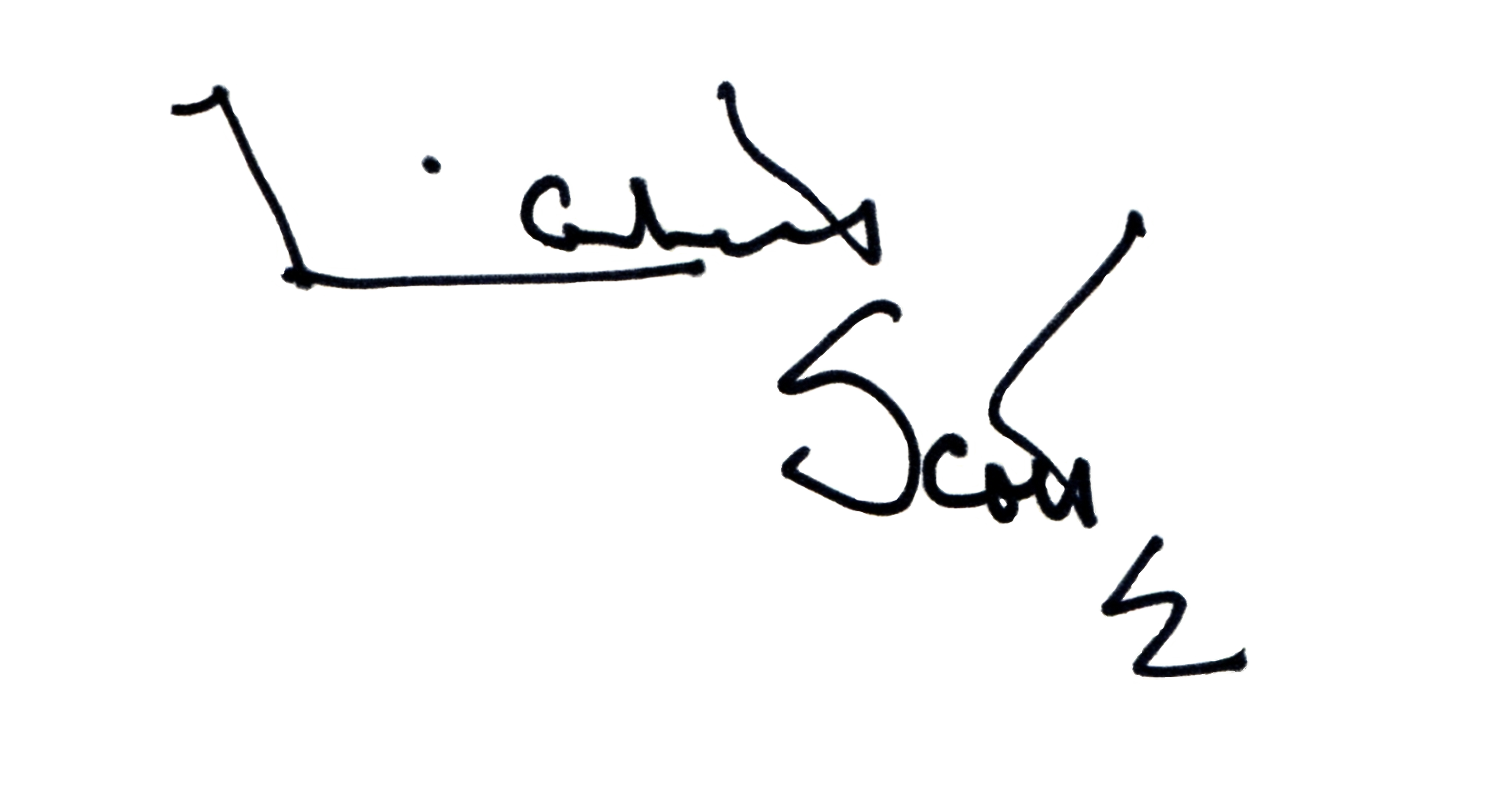

Lizabeth Virginia Scott (born Emma Virginia Matzo; September 29, 1922 – January 31, 2015) was an American actress, singer, and model known for her "smoky voice". She was called "the most beautiful face of film noir during the 1940s and 1950s". After understudying the role of Sabina in the original Broadway and Boston stage productions of The Skin of Our Teeth, she emerged in films including The Strange Love of Martha Ivers (1946), Dead Reckoning (1947), Desert Fury (1947), and Too Late for Tears (1949). Of her 22 films, she was the leading lady in all but three. In addition to stage and radio, she appeared on television from the late 1940s to early 1970s.

== Early life ==
Emma Matzo (Ema Macová in Slovak) was born in Scranton, Pennsylvania, on September 29, 1922, the oldest of six children born to Mary Penyak and John Matzo (Ján Maco in Slovak). Several conflicting accounts have been given as to her parents' ethnic origins, with most mentioning English, Rusyn, Jewish Russian, and Ukrainian. The family lived in the Pine Brook section of Scranton, where her father owned Matzo Market. Scott characterized her father as a "lifelong Republican", which influenced her capitalistic views. The love of music influenced Scott's voice.

Scott attended Marywood Seminary, a local Catholic girls' school. She transferred to Scranton's Central High School, where she performed in several plays. After graduating, she spent the summer working with the Mae Desmond Players at a stock theater in the nearby community of Newfoundland. She then worked at the Barter Theatre in Abingdon, Virginia. That autumn, she attended Marywood College, but quit after six months.

In 1939, with her father's help, the graduate 18-year-old Scott moved to New York City, where she stayed at the Ferguson Residence for Women. In New York, she was a model for the Walter Thornton agency. Scott read Maxwell Anderson's Mary of Scotland, a play about Mary, Queen of Scots and Elizabeth I, from which she derived the stage name "Elizabeth Scott". She later dropped the "E".

== Career ==
=== Debut ===
In late 1940, 19-year-old Scott auditioned for the national tour of Hellzapoppin. From several hundred women, she was chosen by John "Ole" Olsen and Harold "Chic" Johnson, stars of the original Broadway production. She was assigned to one of three road companies, Scott's being led by Billy House and Eddie Garr. Landing her first professional job, she was billed as "Elizabeth Scott". The tour opened November 3, 1940, at the Shubert Theatre in New Haven, Connecticut. She did blackouts and other types of sketch comedy during her 18-month tour of 63 cities across the US.

Scott then returned to New York City in 1942, where she starred as Sadie Thompson in John Colton's play Rain, which ran on the then-equivalent of off-Broadway. It was her first starring role, but no drama critic reviewed the play, although the producer of a Broadway play, Michael Myerberg, did see the show.

Myerberg had just moved an experimental production of Thornton Wilder's new play The Skin of Our Teeth starring Tallulah Bankhead from New Haven to the Plymouth Theatre. Impressed by Scott's Sadie Thompson, he hired her as the understudy for Bankhead, despite Bankhead's protests. Bankhead had signed a contract forbidding an understudy for the Sabina role. Previously, Bankhead had controlled the production by not showing up for rehearsal. Now, Myerberg could simply put Scott in Bankhead's place. Scott has acknowledged that Myerberg used her to keep Bankhead under control and that Bankhead was furious about the situation. Describing her own experience with Bankhead, Scott recalled, "She never spoke to me, except to bark out commands. Finally, one day, I'd had enough. I told her to say 'please', and after that she did." During her eight months as the understudy, Scott never had an opportunity to substitute for Bankhead, as Scott's presence guaranteed Bankhead's. During her time with the production, Scott played the role of "Girl/Drum Majorette". The play ran from November 18, 1942, to September 25, 1943.

The rivalry between the two actresses is cited as an alternative to the Martina Lawrence-Elisabeth Bergner origin of Mary Orr's short story, The Wisdom of Eve (1946), the basis of the 1950 film All About Eve. Broadway legend had it that Bankhead was being victimized by Scott, who supposedly was the basis for the fictional Eve Harrington.

Rumors of an affair between the married Myerberg and the new understudy were rife. Scott has said that her fondest memory was of Myerberg telling her, "I love you," but the two eventually parted.

The continuing feud between Myerberg and Bankhead worsened Bankhead's ulcer, leading her to not renew her contract. Anticipating Bankhead's move, Myerberg suddenly signed 39-year-old Miriam Hopkins in March, catching Scott off-guard. Bankhead's final zinger to Scott was, "You be as good as she (Hopkins) is." For a brief period, Scott understudied for Hopkins. While Scott liked Hopkins much more than Bankhead, she was still disappointed about being passed over for the Sabina role.

Scott eventually quit in disappointment. Before quitting, Scott replaced Hopkins for one night. When Scott finally went on stage as Sabina, she was surprised by both the approval and fascination of the audience. Her replacement as understudy was another future femme fatale, 19-year-old Gloria Hallward, soon to be known as Gloria Grahame. When Michael Myerberg pulled Grahame from the play for another experimental production in Philadelphia—Star Dust— no understudy was available when Gladys George took over for Hopkins.

On August 30, 1943, Scott once again played Sabina when George was ill. Joe Russell was in the Plymouth Theatre audience that night. Afterward, when a friend from California came to New York on one of his biannual visits to Broadway, Russell told him about Scott's performance. Russell's friend was an up-and-coming film producer for Warner Bros., Hal B. Wallis.

=== Rise to fame ===
Irving Hoffman, a New York press agent and columnist for The Hollywood Reporter, had befriended Scott and tried to introduce her to people who could help her. On September 29, 1943, Hoffman held a birthday party at the Stork Club—Scott had turned 21. By happenstance or design, Wallis was also at the club that night. Hoffman introduced Scott to Wallis, who arranged for an interview the following day. When Scott returned home, she found a telegram offering her the lead for the Boston run of The Skin of Our Teeth. Miriam Hopkins was ill. Scott sent Wallis her apologies, cancelling the interview. Scott recalled, "On the train up to Boston, to replace Miss Hopkins, I decided I needed to make the name more of an attention-grabber. And that's when I decided to drop the 'E' from Elizabeth." In 1945, The New Republic claimed that Scott had dropped the "E" as a patriotic wartime gesture "to conserve newsprint."

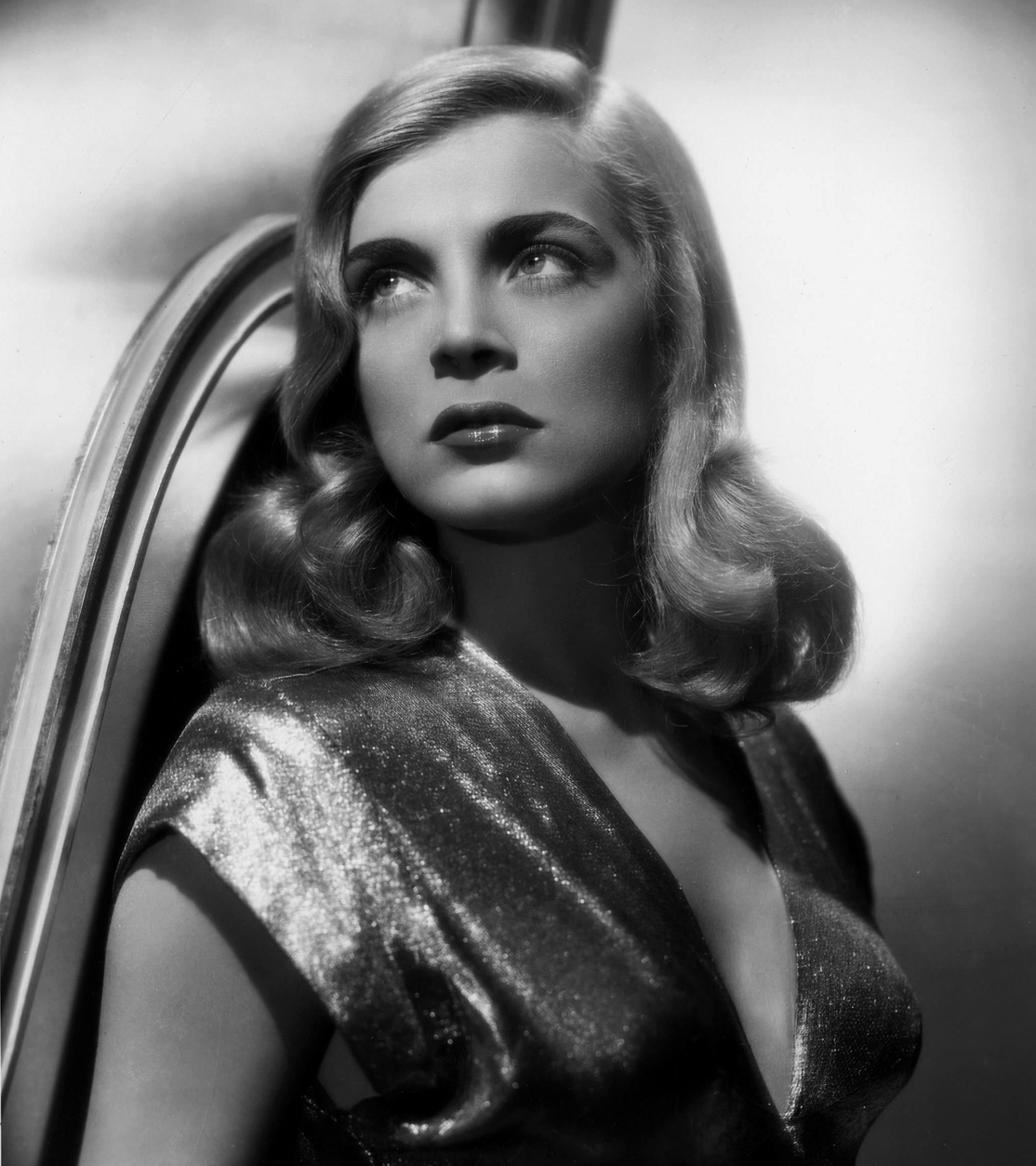
Scott in You Came Along (1945)

Scott appeared in a Harper's photographic spread, which was allegedly admired by film agent Charles Feldman of Famous Artists Corporation. In a telegram to Scott, he asked her to take a screen test. He invited her to come to Los Angeles and stay at the Beverly Hills Hotel. Her first screen test was at Universal, then at William Goetz's International Pictures. She was rejected by both studios. Then she tested at Warner Bros., but this time around, Wallis's sister Minna Wallis arranged for film director Fritz Lang to coach Scott.

Hal Wallis saw Scott's test and recognized her potential. At the age of 22, Scott's film debut was the comedy-drama You Came Along (1945). During the shooting of You Came Along, Hal Wallis showed Scott's screen test to Hollywood columnist Bob Thomas. Wallis told Thomas, "Notice how her eyes are alive and sparkling... Once in a while she reads a line too fast, but direction will cure that. That voice makes her intriguing."

=== Paramount years ===
==== The Strange Love of Martha Ivers ====
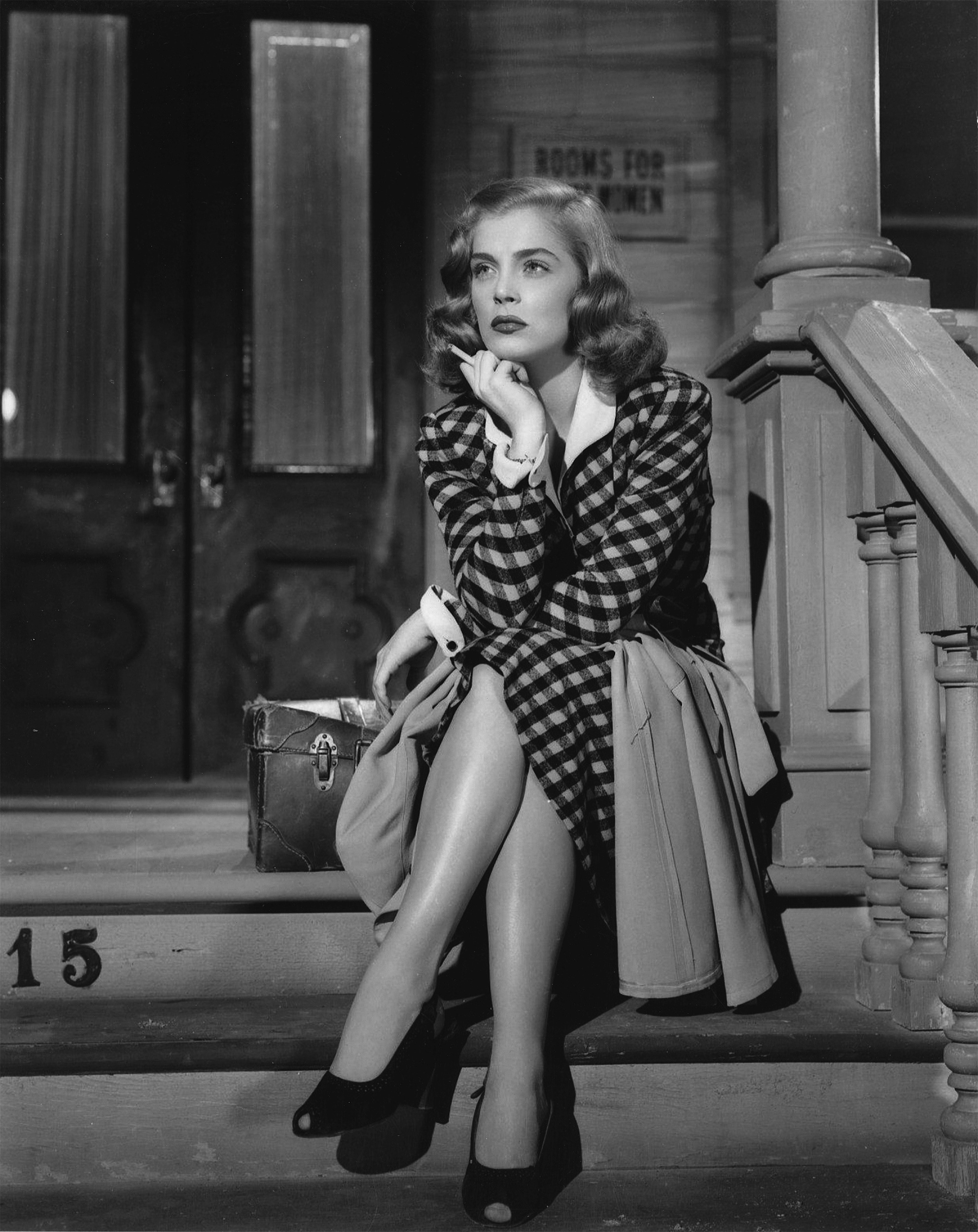
Scott in The Strange Love of Martha Ivers (1946)

Later in 1946, 38-year-old Barbara Stanwyck, in a letter, objected to Scott's top billing in The Strange Love of Martha Ivers (1946): "I will not be co-starred with any other person other than a recognized male or female star." Lawyers for Wallis and Stanwyck got to work, and eventually, the final billing ran Stanwyck, Van Heflin, and Scott at the top, with newcomer Kirk Douglas in second place, but Wallis's interest in promoting Scott was obsessive. The AFI page on Martha Ivers comments:

Director Lewis Milestone is quoted in an article in the Los Angeles Sun Mirror on 8 December 1946 as having said that he would never make another picture with producer Hal Wallis because Wallis wanted to reshoot scenes in this film for more close-ups of Lizabeth Scott; Milestone reportedly told Wallis to shoot them himself—which he did.

Wallis ended up adding extra footage of Scott at the expense of Stanwyck's screen time, which later led to a contretemps between Stanwyck and Wallis. Concerning her first film noir, Scott recalled how strange it was to be in a film with Stanwyck and have only one brief scene together. The screenplay by Robert Rossen depicts two separate story lines running in parallel—one dominated by Martha Ivers (Stanwyck) and the other by Antonia "Toni" Marachek (Scott). The Heflin character, Sam, is the connection between the story lines, which overlap only in the one scene where femme fatale Martha and girl next door Toni meet.

In June 1946, Scott gained the distinction of being the first Hollywood star to visit Britain since the end of World War II. She was there to attend the London premiere of Martha Ivers and do a promotional tour through the country. While Scott was still in Britain, shooting began on a new noir that Scott joined after she returned: Dead Reckoning.

==== Dead Reckoning ====
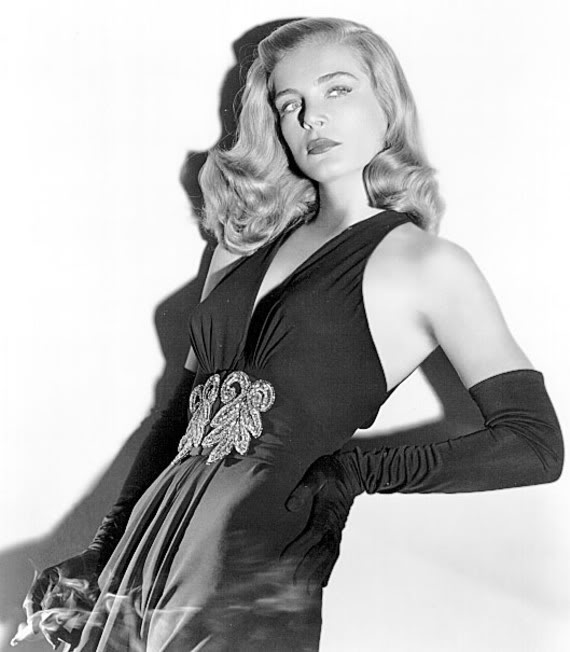
Scott in a publicity still for Dead Reckoning (1947)

Columbia originally intended Rita Hayworth for the role, but she was busy with The Lady from Shanghai (1947). As a result, Scott was borrowed from Hal B. Wallis.

At the age of 24, Scott's billing and portrait were equal to Humphrey Bogart's on the film's lobby posters and in advertisements. Most often portrayed in publicity stills was the Jean Louis gown-and-glove outfit she wore in the nightclub scene. In September 1946, a Motion Picture Herald poll voted her the seventh-most promising "star of tomorrow." Production ran June 10–September 4, 1946. It premiered in New York the week of January 23, 1947. Despite the initial positive publicity, the long-term effect of Dead Reckoning was to typecast the former comedian for her entire career.

==== Late 1940s ====
Historian Kevin Starr wrote of a new type of Hollywood actress who began to appear on screen during the 1940s:

The stars emerging in 1940, by contrast—Rita Hayworth, Ann Sheridan, Ida Lupino, Lupe Vélez, Marie Windsor, Lana Turner, Lizabeth Scott—each possessed a certain hardness, an invisible shield of attitude and defense, that suggested that times were getting serious and that comedy would not be able to handle all the issues... Just a few years earlier, Hollywood had been presenting the wisecracking platinum blonde, frank, sexy, self-actualizing. Now with the war, that insouciance had become hard-boiled.

This "hard-boiled" quality appeared in Scott's two previous films and was repeated in Desert Fury (1947), starring with Burt Lancaster in the second noir filmed in color and a Western as well. Scott again starred with Lancaster, Corey, and Douglas, in Wallis's I Walk Alone (1948), a noirish story of betrayal and vengeance.

More drama occurred behind the scenes of the film, originally titled Deadlock. The Kay Lawrence role was originally intended to be Kristine Miller's breakout role, but Scott, ever competitive with all other actresses, grabbed the role for herself. Miller later recalled, "(Wallis) planned to star me in I Walk Alone. He tested me with Burt; it was a wonderful test, but then Lizabeth Scott decided she wanted the role, and Lizabeth got whatever she wanted—from Hal Wallis! (Laughs) So, I got the second part instead." Douglas, while working with Lancaster on the film, commented:

Lizabeth Scott played the girl we were involved with in the movie. In real life, she was involved with Hal Wallis. This was a problem. Very often, she'd be in his office for a long time, emerge teary-eyed, and be difficult to work with for the rest of the day.

Though relations between Lancaster and Scott had previously been romantic, a falling out happened. Lancaster's behavior toward Scott was chilly, especially during one kissing scene, leaving Scott looking exasperated. By April 9, 1947, Lancaster tried to break his seven-year contract with Paramount. He claimed it violated a previous freelance deal, but added that he did not want to work with Scott anymore. Despite all the issues among the cast and past critics, I Walk Alone is usually now judged to be a film noir classic.

Scott played her third and last ingénue in the second favorite among her own films—Pitfall (1948) with Dick Powell and Jane Wyatt as a middle-aged couple growing apart. Director André de Toth explained his reasons for casting Scott:

I wanted Lizabeth Scott. I didn't want some blonde with big tits. You had to believe that this girl was real. Even if I took one of these over-sexed types who could not act, it would change how the Powell character is drawn into the affair. Remember the point of the script was that he's just a middle-level insurance investigator. He's tired of his job, spending time in his little office with a drab secretary. So I could have made a different picture, with a prettier girl than Lizabeth Scott, and told the story of that girl, her problems, but that wasn't this movie. That would make it phony, if you cast it with Marilyn Monroe, a type like that. I needed somebody real.

In May 1948, it was announced that Jane Greer and Robert Mitchum would star in a football-themed story by Irwin Shaw, originally titled Interference. Afterward, Lucille Ball replaced Greer and Victor Mature replaced Mitchum. Scott was slated to play the club secretary. Then, she replaced Ball as leading lady. The reason for the role switch is unknown, though Ball never forgave Mature for his rudeness when they made Seven Days' Leave (1942). The 37-year-old Ball was in career slump at the time and had to take the secondary role meant for Scott. The final film, titled Easy Living (1949), received a generally negative response when it was released. The New York Times review was uncommonly positive, though dismissive of Scott's performance.

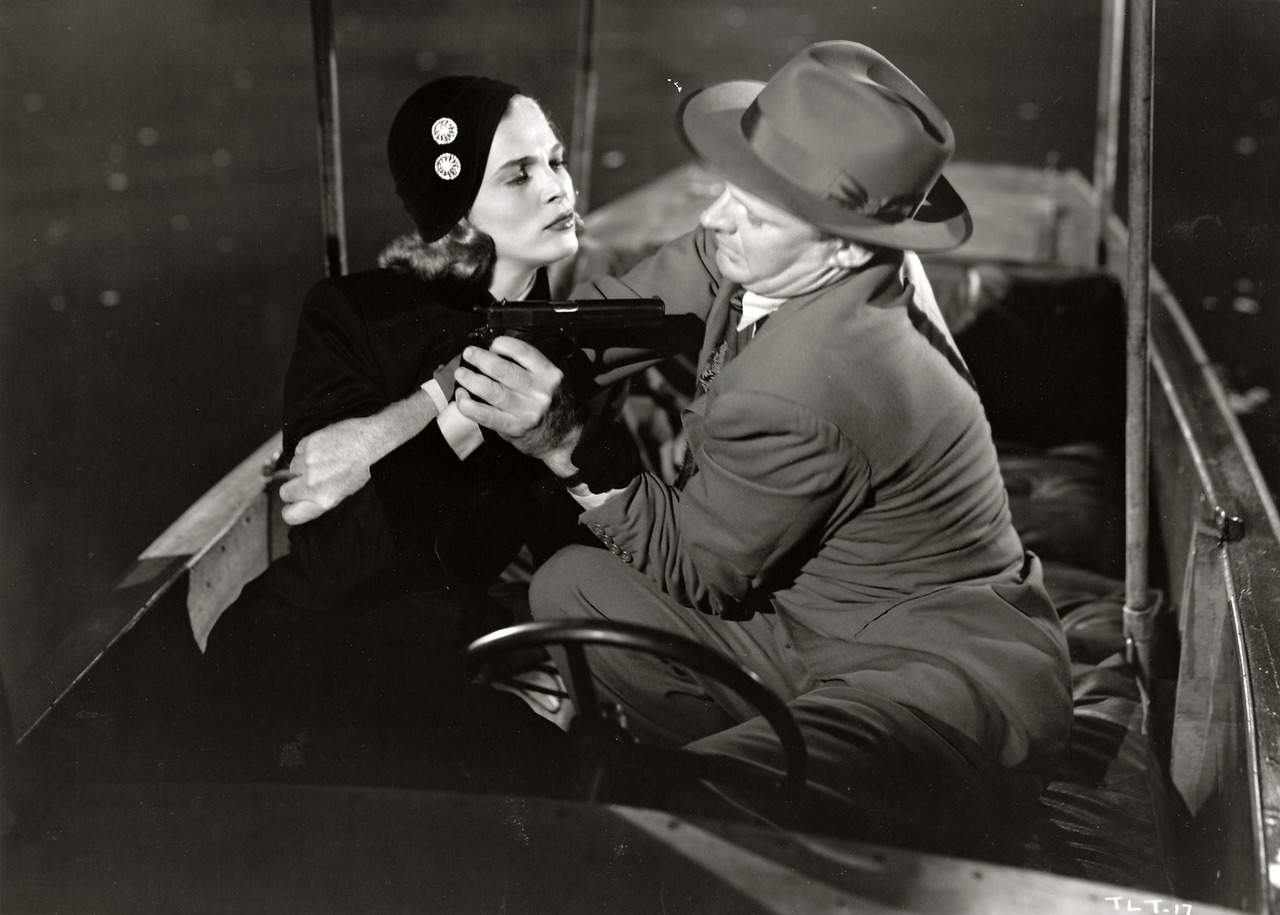
Arthur Kennedy with Scott in Too Late for Tears (1949)

Scott played the ultimate femme fatale in Too Late for Tears (1949), with Don DeFore, Dan Duryea, Arthur Kennedy, and Kristine Miller. This Hitchcock-like, black-and-white noir is widely considered Scott's best film and performance. But, the film was a box-office failure when it was released, and the producer Hunt Stromberg was forced into bankruptcy. Decades later, one film historian reported the film's staying power: "Too Late for Tears is a relatively 'unknown and unseen' noir and deserves this recognition, especially for its storyline, acting, and the incredible performance of Lizabeth Scott in the femme fatale role." At the end of 1948, Scott shifted dramatic gears in Paid in Full which was released in 1950.

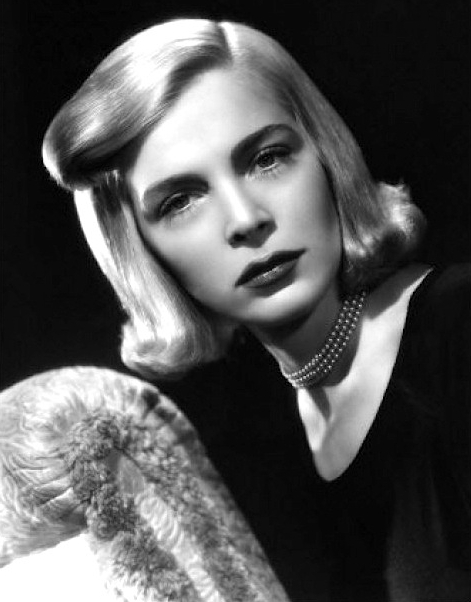
Scott in Paid in Full (1950)

On Tuesday, January 25, 1949, Scott collapsed and went into hysterics on the RKO set of The Big Steal (1949). She immediately quit after three days of production. According to Scott's replacement, Jane Greer, Scott quit because she was concerned about being associated with the leading man Robert Mitchum, who at the time was jailed at the local honor farm for a marijuana conviction—Mitchum was convicted January 10, 1949. It later was alleged that Hal Wallis was responsible for Scott's bowing out. Yet, Scott starred with Mitchum in a RKO film two years later. During this same period, the press reported rumors of Scott's stage fright. Scott later admitted to stage fright, explaining her absence during premieres of her films.

During Scott's recovery period, Walter Winchell, in his "On Broadway" column for June 9, 1949, repeated a rumor of Scott's impending marriage to Mortimer Hall, CEO and president of radio station KLAC. Scott and Hall later broke up. (Hall eventually married actress Ruth Roman; pursued Rosemarie Bowe, who looked similar to Scott; divorced Roman; and then married Diana Lynn, Scott's co-star in Paid in Full.)

By June 22, 1949, Scott reportedly recovered from her January episode and was to be lent by Hal Wallis to the Princeton Drama Festival. In July 1949, Scott returned to the stage in the title role of Philip Yordan's play Anna Lucasta at the McCarter Theatre, on the campus of Princeton University, New Jersey. The press reported: "Folks who expected fireworks when Liz Scott and Tallulah Bankhead crossed paths at the Princeton Drama Festival were vastly disappointed. It was all sweetness and light."

Finally, Scott decided to legalize her stage name. Having been known professionally as "Lizabeth Scott" for almost seven years, she legally changed her name from Emma Matzo on September 14, 1949.

==== 1950s ====
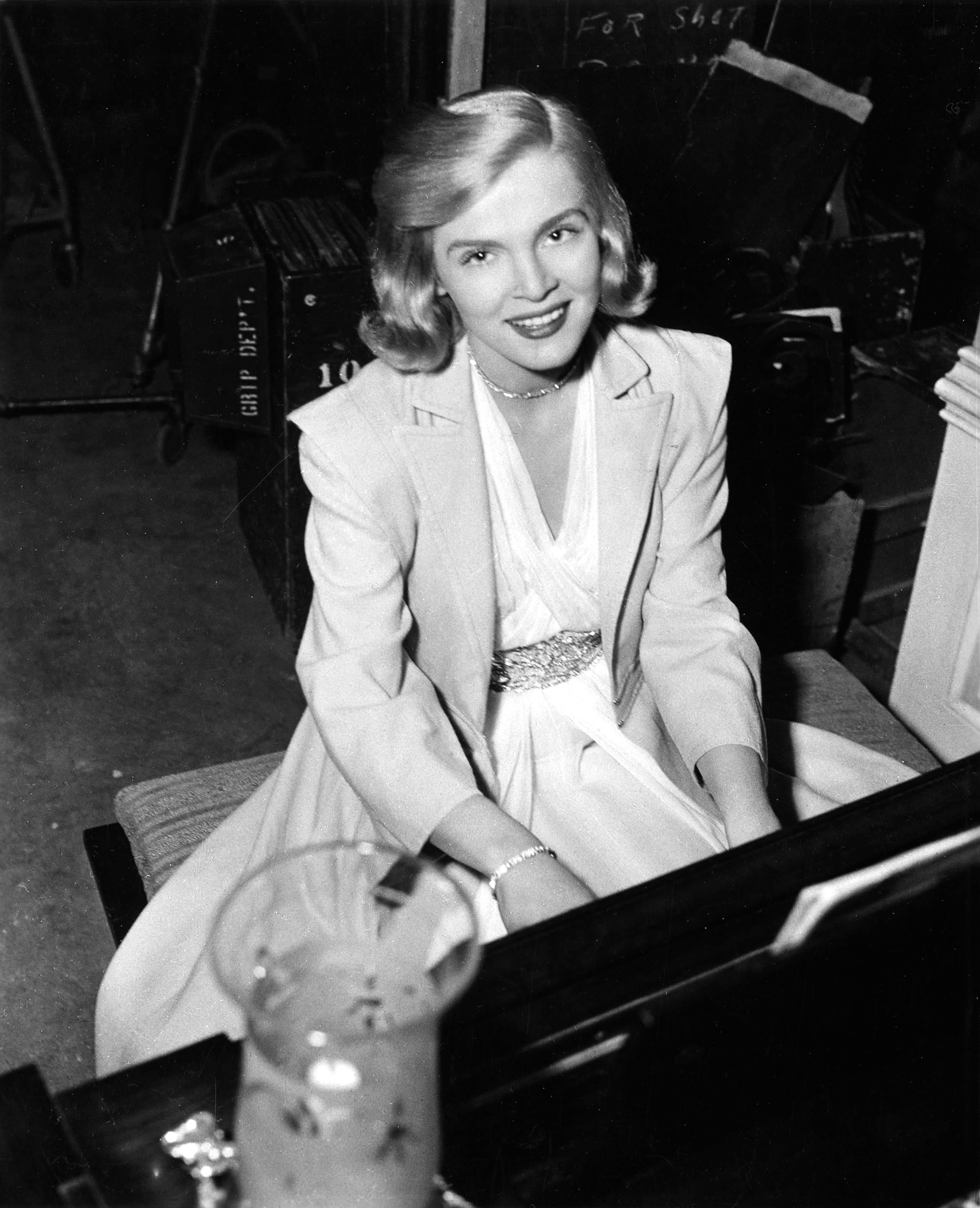
Scott in Stolen Face (1952)

Scott acted in four films in 1950. In a continuing effort to escape her femme fatale typecasting, Scott played another self-sacrificing June Allyson-like character before reverting to her usual torch singer/socialite roles. In The Company She Keeps (1951), she played Joan Willburn, a probation officer who sacrifices her fiancé to a scheming convict, Diane Stuart (Jane Greer). While Greer's beauty was toned down for the film, Scott's was not. As a result, critics were generally unconvinced that the leading man would choose the dowdy Diane over Joan. Most critics thought that Scott and Greer were miscast, and should have switched roles. Columnist Erskine Johnson wrote "Lizabeth Scott is on her second reach-for-the-handkerchief-Mabel picture for RKO."

Scott played her third torch-singer role in Dark City (1950), a traditional film noir. Her boyfriend, Danny Haley (Charlton Heston in his film debut) is a bookie who is the apparent target of a vengeful brother of a dead man whom Haley swindled. Originally, Burt Lancaster was cast as the leading man, but he refused to work with Scott again.

In a May interview, Scott said she was reading the entire oeuvre of Aldous Huxley. In another interview, she admitted almost joining a "cult" endorsed by Huxley, but did not due to the vow of poverty required. Huxley explored reincarnation and destiny, beliefs which Scott also professed in interviews. During Scott's spiritual search, she eventually met the Dalai Lama at a private reception at the Los Angeles County Museum of Art. Yet, conversely, Scott was a friend and reader of Ayn Rand, an Aristotelian atheist. Later in 1950, Scott was cast to do the summer-stock version of Tennessee Williams' Summer and Smoke (1948). Instead, she quit the production and audited two morning courses—philosophy and political science—for six weeks at the University of Southern California.

In Two of a Kind (1951), Scott portrayed Brandy Kirby, a socialite who seduces a gambler, Michael "Lefty" Farrell (Edmond O'Brien), into joining a caper. Red Mountain (1952) is set in the 1860s, starring Scott as Chris, the only member of her family to survive the American Civil War. Red Mountain was the second of Scott's three Westerns, though the only traditional non-noir one.

Scott played her fourth and last torch-singer role in The Racket (1951), another conventional noir. Irene Hayes (Scott) is caught up in a struggle between a big-city police captain (Robert Mitchum) and a local crime boss (Robert Ryan), who resembles the real-life Bugsy Siegel. The film was released two months after the Kefauver hearings, in which Virginia Hill, a former mistress of Siegel's, denied having any knowledge of organized crime. While Irene Hayes was thought to be modeled on the smoky-voiced Hill, Scott denied the rumor.

Scott returned to Britain in October 1951 to film Stolen Face (1952), a noir that presages Alfred Hitchcock's Vertigo (1958) by several years.

Later that spring, Scott returned to her beginnings as a comedian when she began work on her first comedy noir, Scared Stiff, with Dean Martin and Jerry Lewis. Scott played an heiress who inherits a haunted castle on Lost Island off the coast of Cuba. Though Scott had fond memories of working on the set in the years ahead, at the time of filming, she found it trying. Scott found Lewis's impersonations of her offensive, while a jealous Hal Wallis instructed director George Marshall not to let the romantic scenes between Scott and Martin get too steamy. Despite Scott's best efforts, including making excuses for Lewis's behavior to the press, most of her scenes were cut. The film premiered the week of May 28, 1953, in Los Angeles. Despite the negative experience and reviews, Scared Stiff remains Scott's third favorite film.

In April 1953, the 31-year-old Scott made her last film under contract to Paramount. In Bad for Each Other (1953), Scott played a decadent heiress who tries to dominate a poor but idealistic physician (Charlton Heston). The source material for the screenplay, Horace McCoy's novel Scalpel, was more nuanced than the linear morality play of Bad For Each Other. This film was Hal Wallis's last attempt to pair Burt Lancaster and Scott. Patricia Neal was originally cast as Helen, but when Scott replaced Neal, Lancaster had to be replaced by Heston. Though Heston and Scott had previously worked together in Dark City, feuding was reported between the two on the set. The film was a box-office failure. Eight months later in February 1954, Wallis and Scott parted ways. Scott was now a freelancer.

In April 1954, Scott attended the Cannes Film Festival. Though she left for London immediately after the festival, her visit to France had unforeseen consequences. Later that month, it was announced that she would be the host of High Adventure, a travelogue television series for CBS, but she never appeared in it. As Scott put it: "out of the clear blue sky one morning, I woke and decided that I never wanted to make another film again. It was just a spark, I can't explain it."

Regardless, she made three more films: The Weapon (1957), Loving You (1957) and Pulp (1972).

== Critical reception ==
Though the public response to Scott was generally favorable during the Paramount years, the film critics were less so, repeatedly making unfavorable comparisons to Lauren Bacall and Tallulah Bankhead, beginning with Bob Thomas' March 1945 comment about her screen test: "Her throaty voice may well make Lauren Bacall sound like a mezzo soprano." When the most prominent critic of the era, Bosley Crowther of The New York Times, gave a bad review of You Came Along (1945), Scott's film debut, she recalled: "Being very young and naïve at the time, I didn't know you weren't supposed to do such things, so I called him up and complained. I told him how hard everyone worked to make such a beautiful movie, and I couldn't understand how he could be so cruel. I must say he took it awfully well, and was very kind to me." Nonetheless, in his review of I Walk Alone (1948), he stated: "As the torch singer ... Lizabeth Scott has no more personality than a model in the window of a department store." He also wrote of "a frighteningly grotesque Lizabeth Scott, who is supposed to represent a cabaret singer" in Dark City (1950).

Scott's style of acting, characteristic of other film actors of the 1940s—a cool, naturalistic underplay derived from multiple sources—was often deprecated by critics who preferred the more emphatic stage styles of the pre-film era or the later method styles. Typical of the 1940s was Dick McCrone: "Miss Scott, who is an excellent clothes horse, rounds out the principals as Lancaster's moll. Otherwise, she's still the same frozen-face actress she was in Desert Fury and a couple of pictures before that." Current film historians critical of Scott either repeat Bob Thomas' image of an ersatz Bacall, Bosley Crowther in describing Scott's acting as wooden, or a pastiche of actresses of the period, as did Pauline Kael.

Others, though, see Scott's acting in a different light. With the revival of interest in film noir and its corresponding acting style, beginning in the 1980s, Scott's reputation has risen among critics and film historians. In Movieland, his personal history of Hollywood, Jerome Charyn described this style as "dreamwalking": "And then, among the Dolly Sisters and Errol Flynn, Bing Crosby and Dotty Lamour, the Brazilian Bombshell, Scheherazade, Ali Baba, and the elephant boy—all the fluff and exotic pastry that Hollywood could produce—appeared a very odd animal, the dreamwalker, like Turhan Bey, Sonny Tufts, Paul Henreid, Alan Ladd, Veronica Lake, Lizabeth Scott, and Dana Andrews, whose face had a frozen quality and always looked half-asleep ... The dreamwalker seemed to mirror all our own fears. His (and her) numbness was the crazed underside of that cinematic energy in the wake of the (Second World) war."

=== Radio ===
During the Golden Age of Radio, Scott reprised her film roles in abridged radio versions. Typical were her appearances on Lux Radio Theatre: You Came Along with Van Johnson in the Robert Cummings role and I Walk Alone. Scott was also a guest host/narrator on Family Theater.

=== Music ===
Erskine Johnson reported in January 1954 that Scott was being trained by Hollywood voice teacher Harriet Lee, and later by Lillian Rosedale Goodman—the final result was that Scott "has a vocal range of two octaves, A below C to High C," making Scott a mezzo-soprano. In July 1956, Johnson reported that Scott was under the management of Earl Mills, who also managed the singing career of Dorothy Dandridge. Scott was planning to debut as a torch singer on the nightclub circuit.

Scott re-emerged from retirement in Loving You (1957), Elvis Presley's second musical. During the shooting of Loving You, Scott was reported to have been infatuated with Presley. During a kissing scene, she playfully bit him on the cheek, leaving a red mark, which she called "just a little love nibble." The scene had to be reshot with the other side of his face to the camera. Scott's musical debut came to naught, however. Though Hal Wallis tried to get Scott's singing voice undubbed for the production, he was overruled by the studio heads, despite all of Scott's previous voice training. Production ran from late January 1957 to mid-March 1957.

Undaunted by Paramount's refusal to let her singing be heard, Scott signed a recording contract with Vik Records (a subsidiary of RCA Victor). Scott recorded her album with Henri René and his orchestra in Hollywood on October 28, 29 and 30, 1957. Simply titled Lizabeth, the 12 tracks are a mixture of torch songs and playful romantic ballads. Finally on April 23, 1958, Scott made her public singing debut on CBS' The Big Record.

=== Television ===
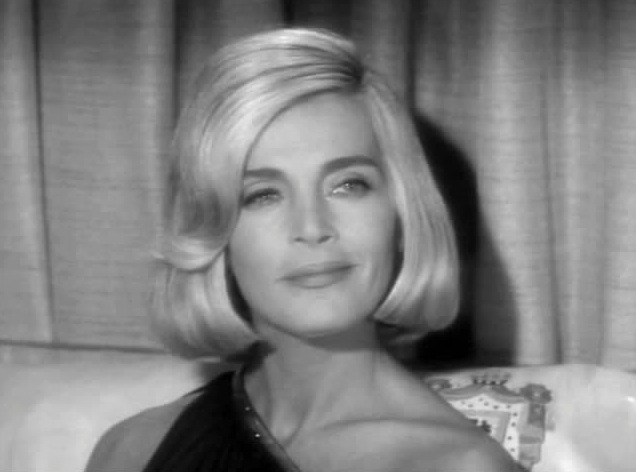
Scott in Burke's Law (1963)

In the 1960s, Scott continued to guest-star on television, including an episode of Adventures in Paradise, "The Amazon" (1960), with Gardner McKay. Scott played the titular character, derived from a boyfriend's dialog: "She is a sleek, well-groomed tigress, a man-eating shark—an Amazon! She chews men up and spits them out." In a Burke's Law episode, "Who Killed Cable Roberts?" (1963), she camped it up as the ungrieving widow of a celebrity big-game hunter. Much of her private time, though, was dedicated to classes at the University of Southern California.

== Confidential ==
Howard Rushmore, editor of scandal and gossip magazine Confidential, developed an exposé on Scott in late 1954. Despite the lack of evidence, Confidential sent a copy of the story to Scott. What Scott read was that a police raid occurred on a Hollywood Hills bungalow at 8142 Laurel View Drive the previous autumn. Two female adults, one male adult, and a 17-year-old female were arrested on prostitution charges. The police found an address book with the names and telephone numbers of people active in the film industry, including two numbers allegedly belonging to Scott. "HO 2-0064" had a Hollywood prefix and was the residential number of an elderly couple, Henry A. and Mamie R. Finke, of 4465 West 2nd Street, Los Angeles, while "BR 2-6111" belonged to the 20th Century Fox switchboard at 10201 West Pico Boulevard, Los Angeles. Scott did not work for 20th Century until 1956, when she took part in an episode of The 20th Century Fox Hour.

The Rushmore article further stated that Scott spent her off-work hours with "Hollywood's weird society of baritone babes" (a euphemism for lesbians). He also wrote, of Scott's trip to Cannes: "In one jaunt to Europe, (Scott) headed straight for Paris and the left bank where she took up with Frede, the city's most notorious Lesbian queen and the operator of a night club devoted exclusively to entertaining deviates like herself." Frede Baulé managed "Carroll's", an upper-class, cabaret-type nightclub at 36 Rue de Ponthieu, Paris, France. It featured mainstream entertainers of the day such as Eartha Kitt and was devoted exclusively to entertaining café society. One of the owners was Marlene Dietrich, who happened to be the subject of "The Untold Story of Marlene Dietrich" in the then current issue of Confidential.

Instead of paying the magazine not to publish the article, Scott sued. On July 25, 1955, two months before the issue's printed publication date, and while the Marlene Dietrich issue was still on the newsstands, Jerry Giesler, Scott's lawyer, initiated a $2.5 million libel suit.

=== 1957 mistrial ===
In retaliation, Confidential published the Scott story in the next issue. Under the byline of "Matt Williams", it was titled "Lizabeth Scott in the Call Girls' Call Book". In November 1955, at the age of 33, Scott again went to Britain to film The Weapon (1956).

The next spring, despite Giesler's reassurances to the press, the legal efforts against Confidential went nowhere. Since the magazine was domiciled in New York state, and Scott was a California resident who had initiated the suit in her own state, Los Angeles Superior Court judge Leon T. David quashed Scott's suit on March 7, 1956, on the grounds that the magazine was not published in California. Despite this setback, Giesler said that he would refile in New York. Lawsuits from other actors against the magazine were piling up. Meanwhile, Rushmore tried to get Confidential publisher Robert Harrison to run a story about former First Lady Eleanor Roosevelt allegedly having an affair with her African-American chauffeur. When Harrison refused, Rushmore quit and flew to Los Angeles to meet with Scott's attorney, Jerry Giesler. Rushmore offered to testify against Confidential in exchange for a job in Hollywood. Giesler rejected the offer. Then, Rushmore became a witness for California Attorney General Edmund "Pat" Brown. Since New York refused to let Brown extradite Harrison to California, Brown instead put Harrison's niece, Marjorie Meade, director of the Hollywood Research investigative arm of Confidential, on trial. On August 7, 1957, the trial of The People of the State of California v. Robert Harrison, et al. began. It eventually involved over 200 actors, most of whom fled California to avoid defense subpoenas. Rushmore, now the state's star witness, testified that the magazine knowingly published unverified allegations, despite its reputation for double-checking facts: "Some of the stories are true and some have nothing to back them up at all. Harrison many times overruled his libel attorneys and went ahead on something."

According to Rushmore, Harrison told the attorneys, "I'd go out of business if I printed the kind of stuff you guys want." Ronnie Quillan herself testified at the same trial that she had never verified the Scott story, thus not making the story "suit proof", but that Rushmore agreed to publish it anyway. However, a mistrial was declared on October 1, 1957, when the jury could not agree on a verdict.

In the wake of the sensational 1957 trial, Scott was forgotten by the media. Despite later claims that Scott's film career was ruined by the Confidential scandal, by the time the September 1955 issue of Confidential appeared, her career was already dormant. Scott had begun her career at a time when many established actors were away at war, giving then unknowns like Scott a chance at stardom. Film historians generally agree that Scott's career essentially peaked between 1947 and 1949. In addition, the rise of television and the breakup of the studio system further curtailed film production. By February 1953, her stage fright was such that she even hid from friends. Scott did not renew her Paramount contract in February 1954, 18 months before "Lizabeth Scott in the Call Girls' Call Book" was published. Between the end of her contract and Rushmore's article, she had turned down numerous scripts, including a part in Wallis's The Rose Tattoo (1955). Instead of reinventing herself as Bacall did, returning to Broadway, Scott chose another path.

== Personal life ==
In May 1969, the wedding of Scott to oil executive William Dugger of San Antonio, Texas, was announced after a two-year engagement. Months later, musician Rexino Mondo was helping Scott decorate her fiancé's mansion on Mulholland Drive. According to Mondo, Scott "introduced me to her fiancé, Texas oil baron William Lafayette Dugger, Jr. He was in his late forties, of medium build, good-looking, with dark hair, a warm personality, and a strong handshake." Dugger described Scott as "A misunderstood soul searching for love. Her outward appearance is just a shell."

Dugger planned to make a film in Rome starring Scott, but he suddenly died on August 8, 1969. A handwritten codicil to his will leaving half his estate to his fiancée was contested by Dugger's sister, Sarah Dugger Schwartz. The will was judged invalid in 1971.

Several books have claimed that prior to her relationship with Dugger, Scott was a mistress of renowned film producer Hal B. Wallis, who at that time was married to actress Louise Fazenda. Wallis had a falling out with Scott around the time of Bad for Each Other, with recriminations on Wallis's part. After a few years, Wallis made an effort to revive the relationship with Scott by making her the leading lady opposite Elvis Presley in Loving You (1957). Wallis thought it might be his last chance to offer Scott a starring role in anything.

After shooting was completed, Scott walked away from film acting to try her hand at singing. The 14-year-relationship that began at the Stork Club in 1943 came to an end. With regard to Wallis, Scott knew the relationship was over—only Wallis remained in denial. After the death of his wife in 1962, Wallis went into a depression and became a recluse before marrying Martha Hyer in 1966.

In later life, Wallis was reticent to talk on the subject of Scott, despite an unjealous Hyer urging him to include Scott and his other mistresses in his autobiography. Though Casablanca was the film of which Wallis was most proud, the films he watched repeatedly were those starring Lizabeth Scott. Even during his second marriage, Wallis continued to screen Scott's films at home, night after night.

Scott tended toward secrecy about her personal relationships and publicly disparaged former dates who told all to the press. Once their date appears in the press, "the man goes off [my] date list... I think," said Scott, "that gentlemen don't tell."

In 1948, Burt Lancaster said of Scott: "Becoming her close friend... is a long stretch at hard labor." In the period between 1945 and the 1970s, the press reported Scott dating Van Johnson, James Mason, Helmut Dantine, plastic surgeon Gregory Pollock, Richard Quine, William Dozier, Philip Cochran, Herb Caen, Peter Lawford, Anson Bond of the clothing store chain family, Seymour Bayer of the pharmaceutical family, David Mountbatten, Marquess of Milford Haven, race-track owner Gerald "Jerry" Herzfeld, and Eddie Sutherland, among others. Burt Bacharach dated Scott during his breakup with Angie Dickinson. According to Bacharach: "She personified what I love about a woman, which is not too feminine but a little bit masculine. Just the strength and the coolness and the separation from the frilly woman who is always touching you and wanting something... I think Diane Keaton had that kind of quality." In 1953, Scott was briefly engaged to architect John C. Lindsey.

Despite the Confidential gossip article, Scott remained active on the Hollywood dating circuit, but the allegations continued to haunt her. A friend, David Patrick Columbia, commented: "One night driving her home from a party we'd been to, she remarked apropos of nothing we'd been talking about, 'and you know David, I am not a lesbian.'"

== Later years ==
Scott made her final film appearance in her second comedy noir, Pulp (1972), alongside Michael Caine and Mickey Rooney in a nostalgic pastiche of noir cliches. The director and screenwriter, Mike Hodges, spent a long time coaxing Scott out of retirement to fly to Malta for the shooting. Scott said that while she enjoyed Malta, she was not pleased that most of her footage was cut out—eight scenes in all. Hodges for his part reported that Scott was challenging to work with while shooting and struggled with nerves. Despite disagreements among the cast, crew, and past critics, Pulp, as with the 1949 Too Late for Tears, is considered an artistic success by film historians.

After that, Scott kept away from public view and declined most interview requests. From the 1970s on, she was engaged in real estate development and volunteer work for various charities, such as Project HOPE and the Ancient Arts Council of the Los Angeles County Museum of Art, where she was a major donor.

Unlike her favorite colleague, Greta Garbo, Scott's seclusion was not total. She continued to date within a close circle of old Hollywood insiders. "One of her best friends was the singer Michael Jackson, and on very rare occasions, she could be spotted on his arm." Nor did she forget Hal Wallis. She appeared on stage at an American Film Institute tribute to Wallis in 1987 and fondly recalled her time with him. In 2003, film historian Bernard F. Dick interviewed Scott for his biography of Wallis. The result was an entire chapter titled "Morning Star", in which the author observed Scott was still able to recite her opening monologue from The Skin of Our Teeth, which she had learned six decades earlier.

In 2022, on her 100th birthday, boutique publisher Pelekinesis released "Lunch With Lizabeth," a memoir by filmmaker/author Todd Hughes detailing his obsession and subsequent twenty year friendship with Scott that began with a 1995 date at famed restaurant Musso & Frank Grill.

== Death and legacy ==
Scott died of congestive heart failure on January 31, 2015, at the age of 93. Until her death she had managed to make herself a year younger than she actually was.

Lizabeth Scott has a star on the Hollywood Walk of Fame at 1624 Vine Street in Hollywood.

== Discography ==
- Lizabeth (1957, with Henri Rene and his orchestra, Vik Records)

== See also ==
- Pin-ups of Yank, the Army Weekly
