= Arthur Franz =

American actor (1920–2006)

- Franz in Bonanza, 1962
- Born: February 29, 1920; Perth Amboy, New Jersey, U.S.
- Died: June 17, 2006 (aged 86); Oxnard, California, U.S.
- Occupation: Actor
- Years active: 1941–1982
- Spouses: Anna Minot (m. 1945; div. 1946); Adele Longmire (m. 1946; div. 1957); Doreen Lang (m. 1964; died 1999); Sharon Keyser (m. 2006)
- Children: 3

Arthur Sofield Franz (February 29, 1920 – June 17, 2006) was an American actor whose most notable feature film role was as Lieutenant Junior Grade H. Paynter Jr. in The Caine Mutiny (1954).

== Early life ==
Franz was born in Perth Amboy, New Jersey on Leap Year Day 1920, a Sunday. His interest in acting developed while he was still a student in high school.

== Military service ==
During World War II, Franz served as a B-24 Liberator navigator in the United States Army Air Forces. He was shot down over Romania and incarcerated in a POW camp, from which he later escaped.

== Stage ==
Franz's Broadway credits include Command Decision (1947), The Moon Vine (1942), Little Darling (1942), and Hope for a Harvest (1941).

== Film ==
Franz made his screen debut in Jungle Patrol (1948). He appeared in Roseanna McCoy (1949), Abbott and Costello Meet the Invisible Man (1951), Eight Iron Men (1952), Invaders From Mars (1953), The Unholy Wife (1957), and Monster on the Campus (1958) among many others. In The Sniper (1952), he played a rare lead in the film's title role as a tormented killer; earlier, he co-starred with John Wayne in the World War II film Sands of Iwo Jima (1949) and with Ronald Reagan in Hellcats of the Navy (1957).

Franz's last role was in 1982 film That Championship Season.

== Television ==
Franz portrayed automobile magnate Henry Ford in the 1955 television film, A Story About Henry Ford, with Karen Sharpe as Ford's wife, Clara Bryant Ford.

Franz was also a familiar face on American television series; he made five guest appearances on Perry Mason, twice playing the defendant and one time the murderer. In 1958 he played the title role of Danny Harrison in "The Case of the Married Moonlighter," and in 1959 he played Richard Vanaman in "The Case of the Golden Fraud." In 1959, he co-starred in the short-lived series World of Giants. In 1962, he played Mr. Evans in "The Case of the Captain's Coin."

In 1960 Franz appeared as Matt Warner on the TV western Death Valley Days on the episode titled "The Young Gun." In 1961, Franz was cast as the historical Paine Page Prim, a future chief justice of the Oregon Supreme Court, in the episode, "Justice at Jackson Creek", on the syndicated anthology series, Death Valley Days, hosted by Stanley Andrews. Prim is shown as a drunken, ostracized lawyer who hesitates to help a miner in legal trouble but must overcome his personal demons to excel at the law. The episode also stars Dub Taylor as Jake; William Schallert as Carl Spenger, and Bill Bixby as Kinney. In 1962, he was cast as Asa Moran, an acting sheriff who abuses of his power, in the episode "The Lawmaker" of the NBC western series Bonanza.

He appeared on dozens of other series, including Schlitz Playhouse, Science Fiction Theatre, Crossroads, Ichabod and Me, Ripcord, Primus, Tarzan, Land of the Giants, The Alaskans, Mr. Novak, The F.B.I., The Mod Squad, Hawaii Five-O, Rich Man, Poor Man Book II, Custer, Mission: Impossible, Mannix, The Rookies, Owen Marshall: Counselor at Law, Storefront Lawyers, The Six Million Dollar Man, The Invaders, The Waltons, Room 222, The Virginian, Gunsmoke, Rawhide, Wagon Train, Police Story, Medical Story, The Outcasts, McCloud, Lancer, Have Gun – Will Travel, Alcoa Presents: One Step Beyond, ('Message from Tomorrow', 1960), and Barnaby Jones.

Franz played the role of U.S. President James Madison in the 1965 episode "George Mason" of the NBC documentary series Profiles in Courage. William Bakewell played George Wythe, and Laurence Naismith played the title role of George Mason.

Franz portrayed U.S. Representative Charles A. Halleck of Indiana in the 1974 made-for-television film The Missiles of October, based on the Cuban Missile Crisis in October 1962.

== Personal life ==
Franz's third wife, actress Doreen Lang, died in 1999. He had previously been divorced twice. He married his fourth wife, Sharon, on February 14, 2006.

== Death ==
Franz died in Oxnard, California, at the age of 86 from emphysema and heart disease.

== Selected filmography ==
- Jungle Patrol (1948) as Lt. 'Mace' Willard
- Red Stallion in the Rockies (1949) as Thad Avery
- The Doctor and the Girl (1949) as Dr. Harvey L. Kenmore
- Red Light (1949) as Capt. Jess Torno (Chaplain)
- Roseanna McCoy (1949) as Thad Wilkins
- Sands of Iwo Jima (1949) as Cpl. Robert Dunne / Narrator
- Tarnished (1950) as Bud Dolliver
- Three Secrets (1950) as Paul Radin
- Abbott and Costello Meet the Invisible Man (1951) as Tommy Nelson
- Strictly Dishonorable (1951) as Henry Greene
- Submarine Command (1951) as Lt. Arnie Carlson
- Flight to Mars (1951) as Dr. Jim Barker
- The Sniper (1952) as Eddie Miller
- Castle in the Air (1952) (uncredited). This film was also called "Rainbow Round My Shoulder" starring Frankie Laine. Franz was 3rd billed.
- Eight Iron Men (1952) as Carter
- The Member of the Wedding (1952) as Jarvis Addams
- Invaders from Mars (1953) as Dr. Stuart Kelston/Narrator
- Flight Nurse (1953) as Capt. Mike Barnes
- Bad for Each Other (1953) as Dr. Jim Crowley
- The Eddie Cantor Story (1953) as Harry Harris
- The Caine Mutiny (1954) as Lt. JG H. Paynter Jr.
- The Steel Cage (1954) as Chaplain Harvey (segment "The Face")
- Battle Taxi (1955) as Lt. Pete Stacy
- New Orleans Uncensored (1955) as Dan Corbett
- Bobby Ware Is Missing (1955) as George Ware
- Beyond a Reasonable Doubt (1956) as Bob Hale
- Running Target (1956) as Scott
- The Wild Party (1956) as Lt. Arthur Mitchell
- Hellcats of the Navy (1957) as Lt. Cmdr. Don Landon
- The Unholy Wife (1957) as Father Stephen Hochen
- Back from the Dead (1957) as Dick Anthony
- The Devil's Hairpin (1957) as Danny Rhinegold
- The Young Lions (1958) as Lt. Green
- The Flame Barrier (1958) as Dave Hollister
- Monster on the Campus (1958) as Prof. Donald Blake
- Woman Obsessed (1959) as Tom Sharron (uncredited)
- The Atomic Submarine (1959) as Lt. Cmdr. Richard 'Reef' Holloway
- Alcoa Presents: One Step Beyond ('Call from Tomorrow ', episode) (1960) (Series 2, Episode 19) as Kevin Stacy
- The Carpetbaggers (1964) as Morrissey
- Alvarez Kelly (1966) as Capt. Towers
- The Sweet Ride (1968) as Army Psychiatrist
- Anzio (1968) as Maj. Gen. Luke Howard
- Dream No Evil (1970) as John, County Psychiatrist
- Million Dollar Duck (1971) as Prosecutor (uncredited)
- So Long, Blue Boy (1973) as Ed Rilke
- The Missiles of October (1974) as Congressman Charles A. Halleck
- The 'Human' Factor (1975) as Gen. Fuller
- Sisters of Death (1976) as Edmond Clybourn
- King Monster (1976) as Narrator
- Rich Man, Poor Man Book II (1977) as Sen. Jones
- The Amazing Howard Hughes (1977) as Barnes
- The Last Hurrah (1977) as Hack Wiles
- That Championship Season (1982) as Macken (final film role)
