= Melinda Byron =

American actress

- Born: Charline Newman; October 20, 1936; Evanston, Illinois
- Died: May 30, 2018 (aged 81); Bethesda, Maryland
- Occupation: Actress
- Years active: 1950s
- Spouse: Faust Rossi
- Children: 3

Melinda Byron (1936–2018) was an American film actress mostly active in the 1950s.

== Biography ==
She was born in Evanston, Illinois and raised in Los Angeles. She began her career in entertainment at an early age on radio.

In the early 1960s she married Faust Rossi and left her film career. They had three children.

== Selected filmography ==
- Behind Closed Doors (1958, TV series)
- Ten North Frederick as Hope (1958)
- Loving You (1957)
- Teenage Thunder as Betty Palmer (1957)
- Rescue 8 (1958)
- Her First Romance as Girl (1951)
- Henry, the Rainmaker as Marilyn Loper (1949)
- The Red Pony as Jinx Ingals (1949) (credited as Patty King}
- Kiss the Blood Off My Hands as Girl Child (1948)
- The Long Night as Peggy (1947)
