= Jimmy Hunt =

American actor (1939–2025)

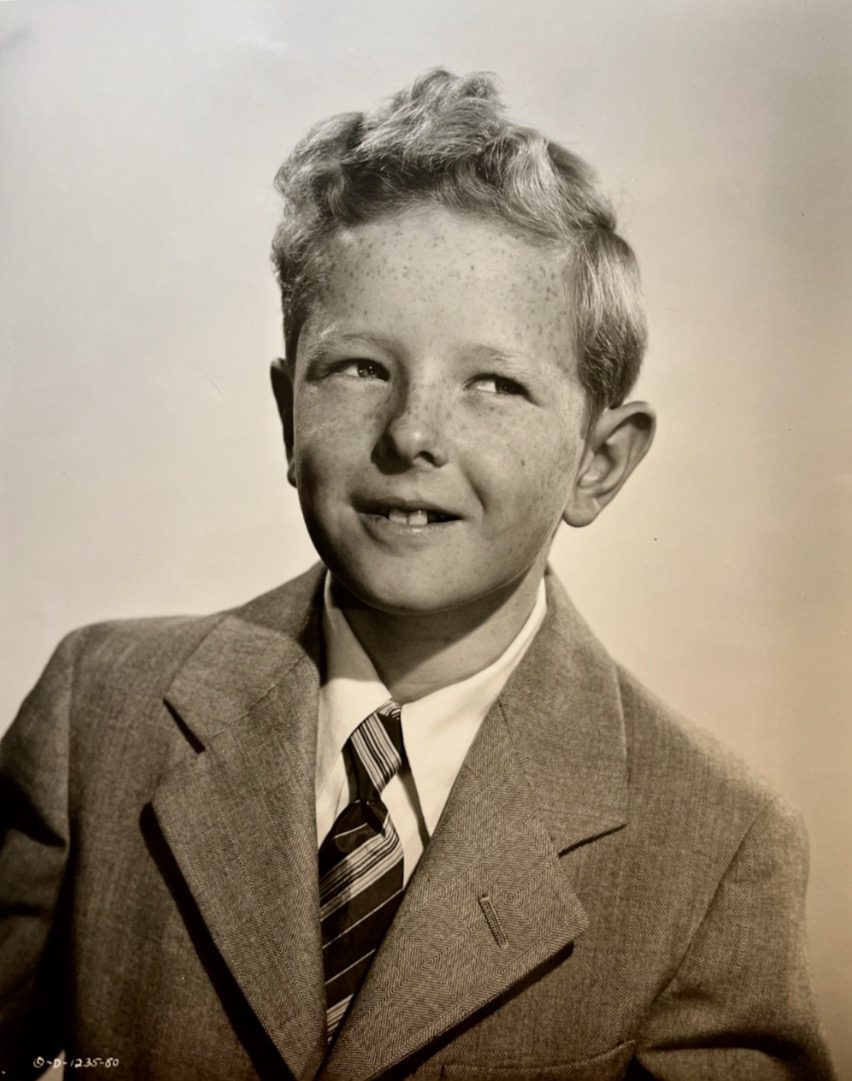
- Hunt c.1950s
- Born: James Walter Hunt; December 4, 1939; Los Angeles, California, U.S.
- Died: July 18, 2025 (aged 85); Simi Valley, California, U.S.
- Occupation: Actor
- Years active: 1947–1954; 1986
- Spouse: Roswitha T. Jager (m. 1963)
- Children: 4

James Walter Hunt (December 4, 1939 – July 18, 2025) was an American film actor, most prominent as a child star who appeared in 35 pictures between 1945 and 1953. He is perhaps best known for his role as David in Invaders from Mars (1953). In the 1986 remake of Invaders from Mars he plays the police chief.

== Life and career ==
Hunt was born in Los Angeles, California on December 4, 1939. He mostly stopped acting when he became a teenager. As an adult, he served in the U.S. Army and went on to work in sales in the aerospace industry. However, he appeared in the 1986 remake of Invaders from Mars, and gave interviews about his acting career well into his later years.

He also appeared in films like Cheaper by the Dozen, The Mating of Millie, Pitfall, Rusty's Birthday, The Sainted Sisters, Sorry, Wrong Number, Top o' the Morning, Louisa, The Fuller Brush Man, Week-End with Father, She Couldn't Say No and more. He acted in multiple films opposite Gigi Perreau.

Hunt retired from acting at the age 14. After high school he attended college and served in the U.S. Army for three years as a codebreaker. He went on to work as a sales manager for a San Fernando Valley industrial supply and tool company that did business with aerospace firms.

In 1963, Hunt married Roswitha Jager, whom he met while stationed in Germany during his military service. The couple had two daughters, one also named Roswitha who died over a decade before her parents, and Alisa, and two sons, Ron and Randy. Hunt also had a sister, Bonnie, and nine grandchildren and six great-grandchildren.

In 1986, Hunt came out of retirement from acting to appear in director Tobe Hooper's remake of Invaders from Mars.

Hunt claimed he was still receiving fan mail for Invaders from Mars 70 years after it was first released.

Hunt died from complications of a heart attack at a hospital in Simi Valley, California, on July 18, 2025, at the age of 85.

== Filmography ==
- Song of Love (1947)
- The Mating of Millie (1948)
- Pitfall (1948)
- Sorry, Wrong Number (1948)
- Family Honeymoon (1948)
- Rusty's Birthday (1949)
- Top o' the Morning (1949)
- Special Agent (1949)
- Louisa (1950)
- Cheaper by the Dozen (1950)
- Saddle Tramp (1950)
- Shadow on the Wall (1950)
- The Capture (1950)
- Again Pioneers (1950)
- Her First Romance (1951)
- Katie Did It (1951)
- Belles on Their Toes (1952)
- All American (1953)
- Invaders from Mars (1953)
- The Lone Hand (1953)
- She Couldn't Say No (1954)
- Invaders from Mars (1986)

== Bibliography ==
- Goldrup, Tom and Jim (2002). Growing Up on the Set: Interviews with 39 Former Child Actors of Film and Television. McFarland & Co. pp. 130–137. ISBN 1476613702.
- Holmstrom, John (1996). The Moving Picture Boy: An International Encyclopaedia from 1895 to 1995. Norwich: Michael Russell, p. 216–217.
