= Teenage Thunder =

- Directed by: Paul Helmick
- Written by: Paul Helmick (additional dialogue); Rudy Makoul (writer)
- Produced by: Jacques R. Marquette (producer); Dale Tate (associate producer)
- Cinematography: Jacques R. Marquette
- Edited by: Irving M. Schoenberg
- Music by: Walter Greene
- Distributed by: Howco
- Release date: 1957
- Running time: 78 minutes
- Country: United States
- Language: English

Teenage Thunder is a 1957 American black-and-white teenaged drama film directed by Paul Helmick. The film stars Chuck Courtney, Melinda Byron, Robert Fuller, Tyler McVey, and Paul Bryar. The opening theme song, "Teenage Kisses", is performed by country music singer David Houston.

== Plot summary ==
Johnnie Simpson, 18 years old, lives with his father and Aunt Martha, after his mother died when he was three. His dad is strict with Johnnie and is constantly criticizing him. Johnnie has a girlfriend, Betty Palmer, who works as a waitress at the local drive-in. Maurie Weston, the town bully, owns a fancy hot rod and teases Johnny about him not being allowed to have a car. One night at the drive-in, Maurie makes a move on Betty, but she rebuffs his advances, and ends up letting Johnnie drive her home in her brother's car. On the way there, Johnnie gets stopped by the police for speeding and driving recklessly. The police drive him home and give his dad a summons to appear in court with his son. His father berates him for his careless behavior, while Aunt Martha suggests that maybe he should spend more time with his son.

Later, Johnnie gets a summer job at a gas station, without telling his dad. The owner of the station is building a hot rod to race, and encourages Johnnie to help him with it. After his father finds out about his new job, he demands that he quit and come to work for him in his real estate office. Later that night, Johnnie and Betty are having dinner together when Maurie again tries to make a move on Betty, and Johnnie gets mad and challenges him to a fight. Maurie suggests that they race, instead, and although Johnnie does not have a car, he agrees to meet him in an hour. Betty refuses to lend him her brother's car again, so Johnnie asks her to take him to a used-car lot, where he persuades the salesman to let him test drive a hot rod. Johnnie promises to return the car the next morning.

When the two meet up to race, Maurie takes him to a deserted stretch of highway, where he suggests they drive towards each other in a "chicken contest", with the winner being the one who does not chicken out and swerve away. Betty and a crowd of other teenaged friends follow them to the location. After the race starts and when the two boys are about to collide, Betty runs right into the middle of their path, which causes both of them to swerve to avoid hitting her. Unbeknownst to the two boys, Betty called the police on her way there, and upon arrival, Maurie takes off. The police take Johnnie and Betty to the station, where their parents are called to come pick them up.

After feuding with his father, Johnnie tells Betty he is leaving town and goes to the gas station and steals the hot rod. The owner calls the police and Johnnie's father and tells them what has happened. Later, Johnnie calls Betty and admits he has stolen the car. Betty then informs him that the owner has entered the car into a race that afternoon. The gas-station owner has a hunch that Johnnie will show up to race the car and invites Johnnie's father and Betty to join him at the race. Sure enough, Johnnie shows up and the owner asks him to race the car, and he competes against Maurie. Johnnie wins the race, has a confrontation with Maurie, and beats him up. Johnnie is now back on good terms with his father, Betty, and the owner. Johnnie's dad offers to buy the hot rod for him, and on their way home in the newly purchased hot rod, the three get stopped by the police and this time his dad gets the speeding ticket.

== Cast ==
- Chuck Courtney as Johnnie Simpson
- Melinda Byron as Betty Palmer
- Paul Bryar as Bert Morrison
- Tyler McVey as Frank Simpson
- Helene Heigh as Aunt Martha Simpson
- Robert Fuller as Maurie Weston
- Bing Russell as Used-car Salesman
- Gil Perkins as Sgt. Benson
- Marshall Kent as Mr. Palmer
- Mona McKinnon as Betty's sister
- Gregory Marshall as Jimmy Morrison

== Reviews ==
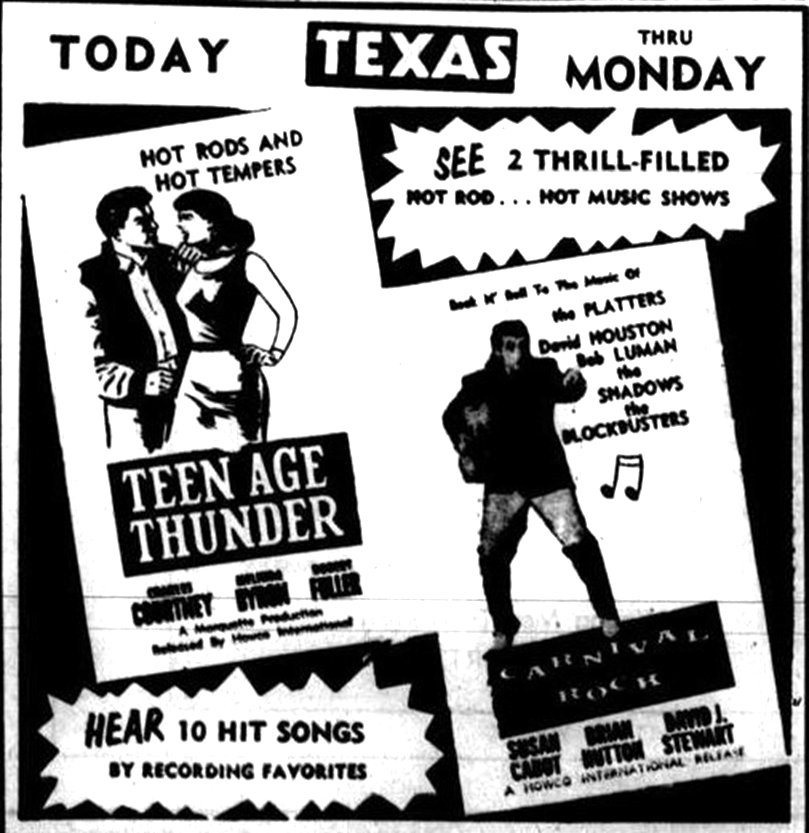
Advertisement from 1957 for Teenage Thunder and co-feature, Carnival Rock.

Teenage Thunder gets a feel of the self-centered, belligerent confusion of adolescence, where battle-lines are drawn against peers and almost every adult is a possible agent of parochial control...had the film based itself around Maurie seeing the error of his ways, a different and more pertinent movie might have resulted...as it is, Teenage Thunder possesses well-staged auto set pieces and some lovely vintage film of the San Fernando raceway, a few steadfast performances, and a heart in the right place; it just doesn't really know where that place is, and like Johnnie, ends up misunderstood.

This is a movie full of fast cars drag racing in the streets and raging hormones pulsing through young bodies. It is a story about hot rods and the social issues of a generation bursting with disillusionment and teenaged angst. While the road to fulfilment is rocky, the story line in Teenage Thunder is intent on showing how good will conquer over evil. We follow Johnnie through his battle to fit in with the cool kids... and his journey to overcome parental oppression.
