= The Loves of Edgar Allan Poe =

1942 film by Harry Lachman

- Directed by: Harry Lachman
- Written by: Bryan Foy
- Screenplay by: Samuel Hoffenstein; Tom Reed; Arthur Caesar
- Based on: Annabel Lee (1849 poem) by Edgar Allan Poe
- Produced by: Bryan Foy
- Starring: Linda Darnell; Shepperd Strudwick; Virginia Gilmore; Harry Morgan
- Cinematography: Lucien N. Andriot
- Edited by: Fred Allen
- Music by: David Buttolph; Cyril J. Mockridge; Alfred Newman
- Production company: 20th Century Fox
- Distributed by: 20th Century Fox
- Release date: August 28, 1942
- Running time: 67 minutes
- Country: United States
- Language: English

The Loves of Edgar Allan Poe is a 1942 American drama film directed by Harry Lachman, starring Linda Darnell and Shepperd Strudwick. The film is a cinematic biography of Edgar Allan Poe that examines his romantic relationships with Sarah Elmira Royster and Virginia Clemm. The film presents a sympathetic and positive outline of Poe's life and career.

== Plot ==
The story focuses on Edgar Allan Poe's romances with, first, Elmira Royster, and, finally, his wife, Virginia Clemm. The story begins in 1811 as Edgar Poe is adopted by John and Frances Allan of Richmond, Virginia after the death of his mother, an actress. Mrs. Frances Allan is devoted to the orphan while Mr. John Allan develops an animosity towards him.

Poe's first love was Elmira Royster, whom he had known since childhood. She married another while Poe was at the University of Virginia, where he amassed gambling debts. In one scene, he is shown meeting with the founder of the university, Thomas Jefferson, although there is no evidence that they ever met.

Poe was never able to forget Elmira. She remained in his thoughts and desires. This passion for her was reflected in his poems. He was disowned by his foster father who opposed his goal to pursue a literary career. Allan disparaged his admiration for Lord Byron. Poe joined the Army and through Allan obtained an appointment to West Point. A military career was not suited for him, so he skipped classes and did not attend functions at the academy, which led to his dismissal.

Poe sought solace in Baltimore with Muddy Clemm and her daughter Virginia Clemm. They took him in and provided him with a home and domestic stability. Poe married Virginia Clemm. After the marriage, Poe did his greatest creative work, becoming the editor and writer for the Southern Literary Messenger and Graham's Magazine.

Poe stirred controversy by advocating for copyright laws that would protect the intellectual property of authors. In this he was supported by Charles Dickens, whom he met in 1842 in Philadelphia when Dickens toured the United States. The mutual admiration both authors had for each other was evident. Dickens tells Poe that he is the greatest writer in America. Poe is subsequently dismissed as editor because of his advocacy of international copyright laws.

Poe, Virginia, and Muddy move to New York City where they live in a cottage in Fordham. Virginia contracts a disease. She is ill. They live in poverty. Poe tells them that he has written his greatest work, "The Raven", which he believes he can sell for $25.

Elmira Royster visits Virginia and offers to provide financial help for her and her husband. Virginia declines the offer of assistance.

Poe offers the poem to Rufus Griswold who turns it down. He has Poe read the poem to his staff of printers. They dislike the poem as well, with the exception of one youth who deems it "wonderful". The film relies on irony because the poem became one of the most famous and successful in American literature.

Poe returns to Virginia and tells her that he has sold the poem. Virginia dies from her illness. Poe is shown reading lines from "Annabelle Lee" for her.

In the final scenes, Poe is dragged through the streets of Baltimore after which he is taken to a hospital. He lingers for three days. He professes his love for Virginia. The film ends with him reading "A Dream Within a Dream" before he dies.

== Cast ==
- Linda Darnell as Virginia Clemm
- Shepperd Strudwick as Edgar Allan Poe
- Virginia Gilmore as Elmira Royster
- Jane Darwell as Mrs. Mariah Clemm
- Mary Howard as Frances Allan
- Frank Conroy as John Allan
- Harry Morgan as Ebenezer Burling
- Walter Kingsford as T.W. White
- Morris Ankrum as Mr. Graham
- Skippy Wanders as Poe, age 3
- Freddie Mercer as Poe, age 12
- Erville Alderson as Burke the Schoolmaster
- Peggy McIntyre as Elmira, age 10
- William Bakewell as Hugh Pleasant
- Frank Melton as Turner Dixon
- Morton Lowry as Charles Dickens
- Gilbert Emery as Thomas Jefferson
- Edwin Stanley as Dr. Moran
- Francis Ford as Tavern Keeper
- Harry Denny as Kennedy
- Hardie Albright as Shelton
- Arthur Shields as Griswald (uncredited)

== Critical reception ==
The film was reviewed in The New York Times where it was judged to be an oversimplified and whitewashed portrayal of the complex and controversial life and career of Edgar Allan Poe.
