= Family Honeymoon =

1949 film by Claude Binyon

- Theatrical release poster
- Directed by: Claude Binyon
- Written by: Homer Croy (novel); Dane Lussier
- Produced by: John Beck; Z. Wayne Griffin
- Starring: Claudette Colbert; Fred MacMurray; Rita Johnson
- Cinematography: William H. Daniels
- Edited by: Milton Carruth
- Music by: Frank Skinner
- Production company: Universal International
- Distributed by: Universal Pictures
- Release date: February 24, 1949
- Running time: 90 minutes
- Country: United States
- Language: English
- Box office: $2.2 million

Family Honeymoon is a 1949 American domestic comedy film made by Universal International, directed by Claude Binyon, and written by Dane Lussier, based on the novel by Homer Croy. It was shot in Grand Canyon National Park, Arizona.

== Plot ==
Katie Armstrong (Claudette Colbert) is a young widow and mother of three children - Charlie (Jimmy Hunt), Abner (Peter Miles), and Zoe (Gigi Perreau). She is also engaged to be married to botany professor Grant Jordan (Fred MacMurray). Grant is seeking funds to raise a new botany research building on the university campus where he works, and the most influential person to convince in this quest is his chancellor, Richard Fenster (Paul Harvey). Grant used to be involved with the chancellor's daughter, Minna (Rita Johnson), and is surprised when Minna crashes his bachelor party. Minna also almost succeeds in completely ruining Katie's engagement party. When Katie hears about Minna's visit at the bachelor party, Grant does his best to assure her that Minna is a finished chapter in his book, but he also has a hard time completely ignoring her, since he needs to be on good terms with the chancellor himself.

Minna is obviously out to sabotage the relationship between Grant and Katie. While the couple are to get married and go away on honeymoon, Katie's sister Jo (Lillian Bronson) has agreed to look after the children. Right before the wedding, Jo injures herself in a domestic accident, preventing her from fulfilling her promise to look after the children. The newlywed couple have no other alternative than to bring the children with them on their honeymoon, which is when things start going wrong. Abner and Charlie abandon the train they are riding together, and disappear into the night at the stop in Porterville. When the rest of the family arrives at Junction City, they take a taxi back to Porterville to look for the missing brothers. In Porterville, they find out that the brothers have left for Junction City with a traveling salesman. It soon turns out they never made it all the way, but hitched with a local farmer, Mr. Webb (Irving Bacon), to his home. The family is finally reunited and the next day they board a train bound for the Grand Canyon.

When the family arrives at the Grand Canyon, Grant discovers that Minna and the chancellor are there, too, on vacation. Minna immediately starts working Grant, trying to spend as much time with him as possible, convincing him to show his preliminary sketches for a new botany building to her father. While this happens, Katie and the children are away on a horseback-riding excursion. Katie meets the chancellor on her excursion, thus finding out about the Fensters' presence at the canyon. She returns to the lodge just in time to be invited by Minna, with Grant, to dinner with her. When Katie is away getting her hair done, Minna surprises Grant with a visit when he is looking after the children. Coming back, Katie finds them both in the lodge together, and a quarrel between Grant and her ensues. Outraged, Grant leaves the lodge in a taxi, while Minna is contentedly watching.

Soon after, Katie also leaves the lodge with the children, and when Grant returns, regretful, she is already gone. Since Katie has told her sister that she is on her way home, Jo decides to throw the happy couple a welcoming party. Upon her arrival, Katie is quite embarrassed by returning home alone to the party, and tries to speak with Jo in private. Minna and the chancellor turn up at the party, and Minna gloats in Katie's unfortunate position, believing that she is trying to escape the attention at the party. The children go away to find Grant, and just as Katie is about to tell the crowd that Grant and she are separated, Grant and the children turn up at the house. Much to Minna's dismay, the couple reunite and get to spend their first night together.

== Cast ==
- Claudette Colbert as Katie Armstrong Jordan
- Fred MacMurray as Grant Jordan
- Rita Johnson as Minna Fenster
- Gigi Perreau as Zoe
- Jimmy Hunt as Charlie
- Peter Miles as Abner, Gigi Perreau's older brother
- Lillian Bronson as Aunt Jo
- Hattie McDaniel as Phyllis
- Chill Wills as Fred
- Catherine Doucet as Mrs. Abercrombie
- Paul Harvey as Chancellor Fenster
- Irving Bacon as Mr. Webb
- Chick Chandler as Taxi Driver
- Frank Jenks as Gas Station Attendant
- Wally Brown as Tom Roscoe
