= A Fugue in Time =

1945 novel by Rumer Godden

- First edition (UK)
- Author: Rumer Godden
- Language: English
- Genre: Drama
- Publisher: Michael Joseph
- Publication date: 1945
- Publication place: United Kingdom
- Media type: Print

A Fugue in Time is a 1945 novel by the British writer Rumer Godden. In the United States it was published under the alternative title Take Three Tenses. The plot explores the history of a London house and the family who have lived in it for many decades.

== Film adaptation ==
It was made into a 1948 Hollywood film Enchantment directed by Irving Reis and starring David Niven, Teresa Wright and Evelyn Keyes.

== Bibliography ==
- Goble, Alan. The Complete Index to Literary Sources in Film. Walter de Gruyter, 1999.
- Le-Guilcher, Lucy; Lassner, Phyllis B., eds. (2010). Rumer Godden: International and Intermodern Storyteller. Farnham, Surrey: Ashgate. ISBN 9780754668282.
