= Gil Perkins =

Australian actor (1907–1999)

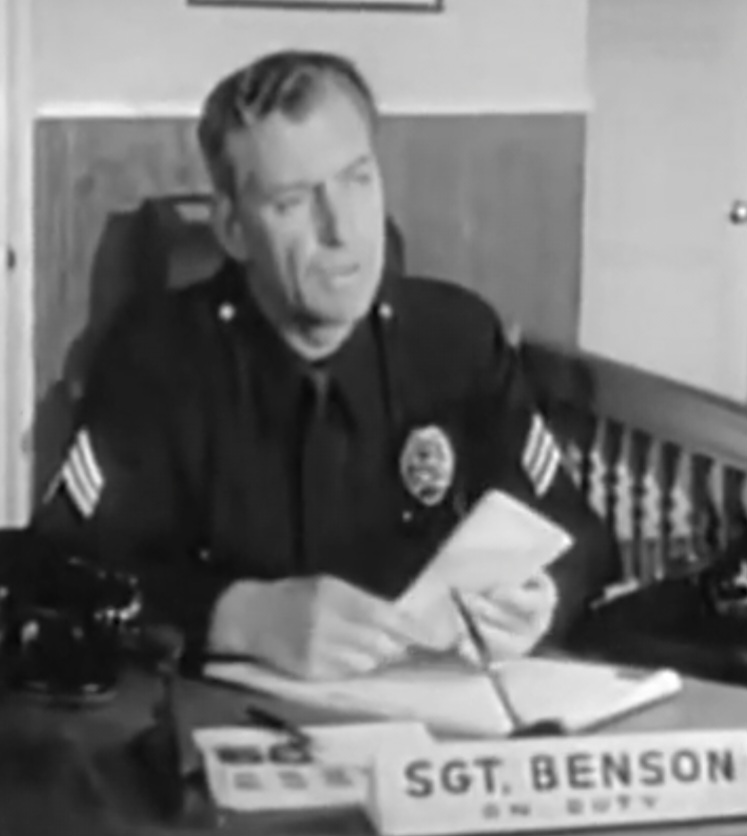
- Perkins in Teenage Thunder (1957)
- Born: Gilbert Vincent Perkins; August 24, 1907; Australia
- Died: March 28, 1999 (aged 91); Los Angeles, California, U.S.
- Occupation: Actor
- Years active: 1929–1980

Gilbert Vincent Perkins (24 August 1907 – 28 March 1999) was an Australian film and television actor.

== Early life ==
As a teenager, Perkins was a trackman and an athlete. He ran away from home at a young age and joined the crew of a Norwegian cargo ship as a deck hand.

== Early career ==
In his early adult life, he left for Hollywood. He modified his Australian accent to be more British-sounding so that he could portray British characters. His first role was as an extra for The Divine Lady in 1929, while his first credited role was as Sgt. Cox in Journey's End the following year.

== Career peak ==
Eventually, Perkins became a regular stuntman for William Boyd. He also did stunt work for Bruce Cabot in King Kong and Spencer Tracy in Dr. Jekyll and Mr. Hyde. He also worked for Universal Pictures in Frankenstein Meets the Wolf Man. Throughout his career, he acted and did stunts in many feature films and television shows. In 1956 Perkins appeared as Mingo in the TV western Cheyenne in the episode titled "Johnny Bravo."

He also did some special effect work, normally for action sequences. He appeared as a Gladiator in Demetrius and the Gladiators, a sequel to 20th Century Fox's biblical epic, The Robe. He was already 50 years of age when he played the "teenaged" monster in the 1958 science fiction/horror film Teenage Monster.

== Later works and death ==
In 1960, Gil Perkins co-founded the Stuntmen's Association of Motion Pictures. Four years later, he became the treasurer of the Screen Actors Guild, a position he held for fifteen years. His official retirement was in 1972, though he continued working for some years later. His last acting role was in Raging Bull in 1980, but his last credited role was as a fantasy lover in Odyssey, the Ultimate Trip. He died in Woodland Hills, Los Angeles, of natural causes, and was cremated with his ashes scattered at sea.

== Filmography ==
- The Divine Lady (1929) - Extra (uncredited) (film debut)
- Journey's End (1930) - Sergeant Cox
- Madison Square Garden (1932) - Extra (uncredited)
- King Kong (1933) - Sailor (uncredited)
- The Nitwits (1935) - Minor Role (uncredited)
- Dante's Inferno (1935) - Stoker (uncredited)
- A Feather in Her Hat (1935) - Ticket Taker (uncredited)
- Mutiny on the Bounty (1935) - Able-Bodied Seaman (uncredited)
- Mummy's Boys (1936) - Native Cop (uncredited)
- God's Country and the Woman (1937) - First Man at Boundary (uncredited)
- Captains Courageous (1937) - Crewman (uncredited)
- In Old Chicago (1938) - Hub Patron (uncredited)
- Confessions of a Nazi Spy (1939) - Goebbels's Aide (uncredited)
- Second Fiddle (1939) - Studio Grip (uncredited)
- Blackmail (1939) - Kearney, Oil Worker Blown Up (uncredited)
- Wildcat Bus (1940) - Wildcat Driver (uncredited)
- Hello, Sucker (1941) - Minor Role (uncredited)
- Riders of Death Valley (1941) - Fighter (uncredited)
- Dr. Jekyll and Mr. Hyde (1941) - Brawler (uncredited)
- A Yank in the R.A.F. (1941) - Sergeant (uncredited)
- Hellzapoppin' (1941) - Butler in Pool (uncredited)
- Reap the Wild Wind (1942) - Southern Cross Leadsman (uncredited)
- Spy Smasher (1942) - Sub-Valve Sailor [Chs. 3-4] (uncredited)
- A Desperate Chance for Ellery Queen (1942) - Tough Woman's Escort at Bar (uncredited)
- Mrs. Miniver (1942) - Man in Tavern (uncredited)
- The Magnificent Ambersons (1942) - Citizen (uncredited)
- The Big Street (1942) - Mug (uncredited)
- Journey for Margaret (1942) - Man in Subway (uncredited)
- Random Harvest (1942) - Hospital Attendant (uncredited)
- No Time for Love (1943) - Pop Murphy's Waiter (uncredited)
- G-Men vs. the Black Dragon (1943) - Mansion Heavy 1 / Intern 2 (uncredited)
- They Got Me Covered (1943) - Nazi (uncredited)
- Slightly Dangerous (1943) - Undetermined Minor Role (uncredited)
- The Man from Down Under (1943) - Australian Soldier / Bartender - Sydney Pub (uncredited)
- Arizona Trail (1943) - Henchman (uncredited)
- Whistling in Brooklyn (1943) - Police Sergeant (uncredited)
- Captain America (1944) - Barn Thug [Ch. 2] / Hotel Room Thug [Ch. 9] / Waiter Thug [Chs. 13-14] (uncredited)
- The Desert Hawk (1944) - (uncredited)
- Abroad with Two Yanks (1944) - Tough Marine (uncredited)
- Heavenly Days (1944) - Confederate Soldier (uncredited)
- I'll Remember April (1945) - Roughneck (uncredited)
- Bells of Rosarita (1945) - Studio Stunts Henchman (uncredited)
- The Fatal Witness (1945) - Detective (uncredited)
- Cloak and Dagger (1946) - Gestapo Agent (uncredited)
- Son of Zorro (1947) - Ranchhouse Henchman (uncredited)
- Twilight on the Rio Grande (1947) - Rurale (uncredited)
- Jesse James Rides Again (1947) - Barn Henchman (uncredited)
- Desire Me (1947) - Soldier (uncredited)
- The Black Widow (1947) - Burke (uncredited)
- Killer McCoy (1947) - Man in Pool Hall (uncredited)
- G-Men Never Forget (1948) - Finch, Welder Thug [Ch. 7] (uncredited)
- Hollow Triumph (1948) - Stansyck Hood Who Jumps Big Boy (uncredited)
- The Three Musketeers (1948) - Felton (uncredited)
- Kidnapped (1948) - Sailor (uncredited)
- Take Me Out to the Ball Game (1949) - Baseball Fan (uncredited)
- Bride of Vengeance (1949) - Huntsman (uncredited)
- The Lost Tribe (1949) - Dojek (uncredited)
- Barbary Pirate (1949) - Coachman (uncredited)
- Cargo to Capetown (1950) - Brawling Seaman (uncredited)
- Father of the Bride (1950) - Moving Man (uncredited)
- The Flame and the Arrow (1950) - Guard (uncredited)
- Double Deal (1950) - Harry (uncredited)
- Chicago Calling (1951) - Construction Worker (uncredited)
- Show Boat (1951) - Player (uncredited)
- His Kind of Woman (1951) - Seaman (uncredited)
- Roadblock (1951) - Patrolman (uncredited)
- The Desert Fox (1951) - German Soldier (uncredited)
- Double Dynamite (1951) - Minor Role (uncredited)
- The Steel Fist (1952) - First Organizer
- Gobs and Gals (1952) - Russian Agent (uncredited)
- Brave Warrior (1952) - English Lieutenant
- Fearless Fagan (1952) - Max (uncredited)
- Plymouth Adventure (1952) - Sailor (uncredited)
- Hans Christian Andersen (1952) - Second Gendarme
- The Member of the Wedding (1952) - Moving Man (uncredited)
- The Clown (1953) - Dundee (uncredited)
- Code Two (1953) - 1st Man in Warehouse (uncredited)
- The Beast from 20,000 Fathoms (1953) - Blind Man (uncredited)
- Abbott and Costello Meet Dr. Jekyll and Mr. Hyde (1953) - Oscar (uncredited)
- I, the Jury (1953) - Lolly (uncredited)
- City of Bad Men (1953) - Bob Fitzsimmons (uncredited)
- Private Eyes (1953) - Al (uncredited)
- Charge of the Lancers (1954) - Officer with Head Wound (uncredited)
- Demetrius and the Gladiators (1954) - Gladiator (uncredited)
- The Big Chase (1954) - Payroll Guard
- East of Eden (1955) - Lettuce Truck Worker (uncredited)
- The Sea Chase (1955) - Baldhead (uncredited)
- The Phenix City Story (1955) - Wilson's Henchman (uncredited)
- I Died a Thousand Times (1955) - Slim (uncredited)
- Bundle of Joy (1956) - Bouncer (uncredited)
- Shoot-Out at Medicine Bend (1957) - Ed Olsen (uncredited)
- Calypso Heat Wave (1957) - First Thug
- Baby Face Nelson (1957) - FBI Agent Duncan (uncredited)
- Teenage Thunder (1957) - Sergeant Benson
- Teenage Monster (1958) - Charles Cannon
- Violent Road (1958) - Sheriff Sam Vincent (uncredited)
- High School Confidential (1958) - Police Sergeant (uncredited)
- The Buccaneer (1958) - Stevedore (uncredited)
- Gunmen from Laredo (1959) - Prisoner (uncredited)
- The Beat Generation (1959) - Lovers Lane Bandit (uncredited)
- Guns of the Timberland (1960) - Townsman in Brawl (uncredited)
- Spartacus (1960) - Slave Leader (uncredited)
- The Alamo (1960) - Tennessean (uncredited)
- Alfred Hitchcock Presents (1961) (Season 6 Episode 35: "Coming Home") - Bus Driver (uncredited)
- Portrait of a Mobster (1961) - Joe Murdoch
- Valley of the Dragons (1961) - Tarn / Doctor
- Experiment in Terror (1962) - Taxi Driver (uncredited)
- Black Gold (1962) - Fat Man (uncredited)
- Kid Galahad (1962) - Freddie (uncredited)
- Pressure Point (1962) - Bar Patron (uncredited)
- How the West Was Won (1962) - Henchman (uncredited)
- 4 for Texas (1963) - Dock Worker (uncredited)
- The Greatest Story Ever Told (1965) - Jacob of Bethlehem (uncredited)
- The Great Race (1965) - Saloon Brawler (uncredited)
- The Glory Guys (1965) - Brawler (uncredited)
- Batman (1966) - Bluebeard
- The Sand Pebbles (1966) - Customer at Red Kettle Bar (uncredited)
- Lost in Space (1967) - Convict (uncredited)
- What's Up, Doc? (1972) - Jones' Driver
- Walking Tall (1973) - 1st Bouncer
- Sherlock Holmes in New York (1976) - Carriage Driver
- The Prisoner of Zenda (1979) - (uncredited)
- Raging Bull (1980) - Cornerman (uncredited) (final film role)
