= Shepperd Strudwick =

American actor (1907–1983)

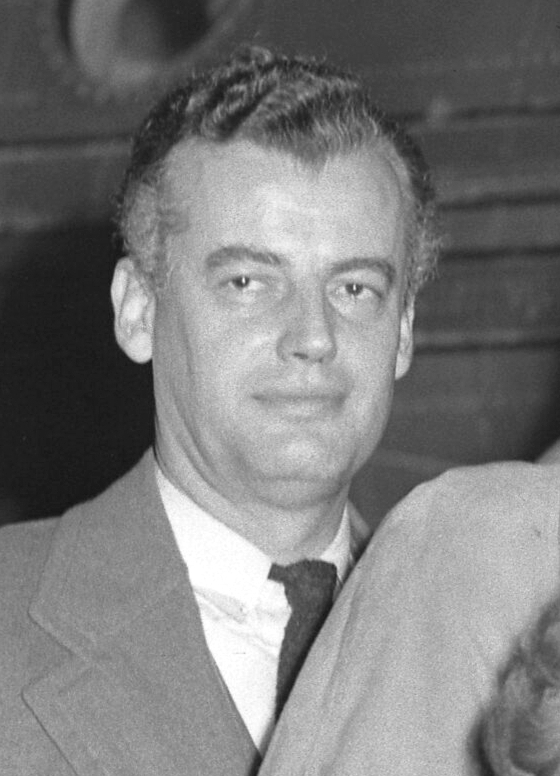
- Shepperd Strudwick (1947)
- Born: September 22, 1907; Hillsborough, North Carolina, U.S.
- Died: January 15, 1983 (aged 75); New York City, U.S.
- Education: University of North Carolina
- Years active: 1938–1982
- Spouse(s): Mary Jeffrey (1977–1983) (his death); Jane Straub (1958–?) (divorced); Margaret O'Neill (1947–?) (divorced); Helen Wynn (1936–?) (divorced; 1 child)

Shepperd Strudwick (September 22, 1907 – January 15, 1983) was an American actor of film, television, and stage. He was also billed as John Shepperd for some of his films and for his acting on stage in New York.

== Early years ==
Strudwick was born in Hillsborough, North Carolina. He attended Virginia Episcopal School in Lynchburg, Virginia, and the University of North Carolina. At the university, he played football and basketball and ran the mile in track. He gained early acting experience in a summer stock theatre company in Maine.

== Career ==
He began his film career as the title character in the short film Joaquin Murrieta (1938), credited as Sheppard Strudwick. He appeared as Yugoslav guerrilla leader Lt. Aleksa Petrovic, an aide to General Draza Mihailovich, in the 20th Century Fox war film Chetniks! The Fighting Guerrillas in 1943, credited as John Shepperd.

During World War II, Strudwick served in the Navy.

He played Edgar Allan Poe in The Loves of Edgar Allan Poe (1942) and also appeared in Strange Triangle (1946), Fighter Squadron (1948), The Reckless Moment (1949), The Red Pony (1949), Under the Gun (1951), and A Place in the Sun (1951), starring Elizabeth Taylor and Montgomery Clift, as the Taylor character's father.

He portrayed Adam Stanton, the idealistic doctor who finally kills Willie Stark (played by Broderick Crawford) in the classic film All the King's Men (1949). Another notable role was Father Jean Massieu in Joan of Arc (1948), starring Ingrid Bergman as Joan.

Strudwick made many appearances on television, including the role of Dr. Charles Morris in the 1958 Perry Mason episode, "The Case of the Fugitive Nurse." He also appeared on The Twilight Zone, (in the episode "Nightmare as a Child") and several roles on the soap operas As the World Turns (Dr. Fields), Another World (Jim Matthews), One Life to Live (Victor Lord), and Love of Life (Timothy McCauley). In 1981, he starred as the voice of Homer in the National Radio Theater's Peabody Award-winning radio dramatization of the Odyssey.

His last appearance on film was in 1981's Kent State, a TV film. That same year, he was nominated for the Tony Award for Best Actor (Featured Role – Play) for the Broadway play To Grandmother's House We Go.

Strudwick acted in at least 30 Broadway plays, beginning with The Yellow Jacket (1929), and ending with To Grandmother's House We Go (1981).

== Personal life ==
Strudwick married Helen Wynn, (born Helen R. Sims), with whom he acted in stock theatre in Maine, on May 10, 1936, in New York City. They had a son in 1944. In 1949, he was married to Jean Mead, who had worked for the British Information Service. Strudwick was married to Mary Jeffrey from 1977 until his death. He died in New York City from cancer on January 15, 1983, at the age of 75.

== Acting credits ==
=== Film ===
- Fast Company (1938) as Ned Morgan (film debut)
- Old Glory (1939, Short) as Paul Revere (voice, uncredited)
- Congo Maisie (1940) as Dr. John McWade
- Mighty Hunters (1940, Short) as Narrator (voice, uncredited)
- Dr. Kildare's Strange Case (1940) as Dr. Gregory 'Greg' Lane
- Tom Thumb in Trouble (1940, Short) as Narrator/Tom Thumb's Father (voice, uncredited)
- The Mortal Storm (1940) as Narrator (uncredited)
- Flight Command (1940) - Lieut. Jerry Banning
- Belle Starr (1941) as Ed Shirley
- The Men in Her Life (1941) as Roger Chevis
- Cadet Girl (1941) as Bob Mallory
- Remember the Day (1941) as Dewey Roberts
- Rings on Her Fingers (1942) as Tod Fenwick
- Ten Gentlemen from West Point (1942) as Henry Clay
- The Loves of Edgar Allan Poe (1942) as Edgar Allan Poe
- Dr. Renault's Secret (1942) as Dr. Larry Forbes
- Chetniks! The Fighting Guerrillas (1943) as Lt. Aleksa Petrovic
- Strange Triangle (1946) as Earl Huber
- Home, Sweet Homicide (1946) as Mr.Wallace Sanford
- Joan of Arc (1948) as Father Massieu (Joan's bailiff)
- Fighter Squadron (1948) as Brig. Gen. Mel Gilbert
- Enchantment (1948) as Marchese Del Laudi
- The Red Pony (1949) as Mr. Fred Tiflin
- Reign of Terror (1949) as Napoleon Bonaparte (voice, uncredited)
- The Reckless Moment (1949) as Ted Darby
- Chicago Deadline (1949) as Edgar 'Blacky' Franchot
- All the King's Men (1949) as Adam Stanton
- The Kid from Texas (1950) as Roger Jameson
- Let's Dance (1950) as Timothy Bryant
- Three Husbands (1950) as Arthur Evans
- A Place in the Sun (1951) as Anthony "Tony" Vickers
- Under the Gun (1951) as Milo Bragg
- The Eddy Duchin Story (1956) as Sherman Wadsworth
- Autumn Leaves (1956) as Dr. Malcolm Couzzens
- Beyond a Reasonable Doubt (1956) as Jonathan Wilson
- That Night! (1957) as Dr. Bernard Fischer
- The Sad Sack (1957) as Major General Vanderlip
- Girl on the Run (1958) as James McCullough/Ralph Graham
- Violent Midnight (1963) as Adrian Benedict
- Daring Game (1968) as Dr. Henry L. Carlyle
- Slaves (1969) as Mr. Stillwell
- The Monitors (1969) as Tersh Jeterax
- Cops and Robbers (1973) as Mr. Eastpoole (final film)

=== Television ===
- Wagon Train (1957) as Colonel Charles E. Beauchamp
- Perry Mason (1958) as Dr. Charles Morris
- Have Gun - Will Travel (1960) as Colonel Benjamin Nunez
- 77 Sunset Strip (1960) as James McCullough
- Thriller (1960) as Douglas Kilburn
- The Barbara Stanwyck Show (1960) as Bill Mowry
- The Twilight Zone (1961) as Peter Selden ("Nightmare as a Child" episode)
- One Life to Live (1968) as Victor Lord
- McMillan & Wife (1971) as Rudolph Dimrose
- The Adams Chronicles (1976) as Dr. Hooper
- Love of Life (1980) as Timothy McCauley
- Nurse (1982) as William Mercier (final appearance)

=== Radio ===
- National Radio Theater: Odyssey as Homer

=== Stage ===
- To Grandmother's House We Go, Broadway play

== Awards ==
- 1981 — Tony Award for Best Featured Actor in a Play:
  - To Grandmother's House We Go - Nominated
