= William Eythe =

American actor (1918–1957)

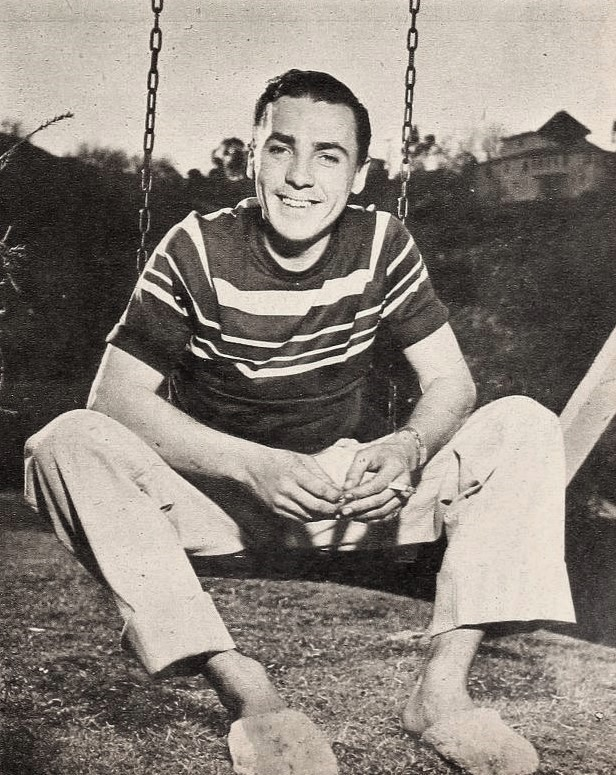
- Eythe in 1946
- Born: William John Eythe; April 7, 1918; Mars, Pennsylvania, U.S.
- Died: January 26, 1957 (aged 38); Los Angeles, California, U.S.
- Resting place: Saint Peters Cemetery, Butler County, Pennsylvania, U.S.
- Other name: Will Eythe
- Occupation: Actor
- Years active: 1943–1957
- Spouse: Buff Cobb (m. 1947; div. 1949)
- Partner: Lon McCallister

William John Eythe (April 7, 1918 – January 26, 1957) was an American actor of film, radio, television and stage.

== Early life ==
Born in Mars, Pennsylvania, a small town located about 25 miles from Pittsburgh, he was interested in acting from a young age. He converted an old barn into a theatre and started performing plays he had written.

He managed a dairy store in his home town for a year and began taking night courses at the Art Institute of Pittsburgh. He went to see Burgess Meredith on stage in Winterset and Meredith advised him to study at Carnegie Tech University. At Carnegie, Eythe appeared in over 80 plays.

== Career ==
=== Theatre Work ===
Eythe appeared in and produced Lend an Ear for the Pittsburgh Civic Playhouse. He also acted in that play in Cohassett, Massachusetts with Sheila Barrett. He formed the Fox Chapel Players in Pittsburgh, a stock company composed mostly of former Carnegie students; it lasted one production of Liliom.

In June 1941 Eythe joined his first professional stock company, in Cohassett, appearing alongside such names as Ruth Chatterton, Nancy Carroll and George Nagel. He was seen in a production of Ladies in Retirement by a talent scout from 20th Century Fox who offered a screen test. Eythe turned it down, saying he was not ready.

After appearing in Caprice in Canada with Chatterton, Eythe went to New York.

=== New York ===
In New York, Eythe got various jobs performing in radio dramas and as an announcer for a local television station, WBNT. He was MC for a variety show.

Eythe had a role on Broadway in The Moon is Down (1942) by John Steinbeck. During try-outs in Baltimore, Eythe was hit on the head doing a scene, injuring his hearing. This meant he would be unfit for military service. During the Second World War, many of Hollywood's young male stars were away at war, and the film studios were forced to locate newer, younger actors who were below the age of military service, or those actors who were considered unfit for service due to medical conditions. As one such actor, Eythe was spotted by a talent scout for 20th Century Fox films.

The test was successful and Eythe signed a long-term contract with the studio on 20 June 1942.

=== 20th Century Fox ===
Eythe was given a screen-test, and landed a role in the film The Ox-Bow Incident (1943), which co-starred Henry Fonda and Dana Andrews. He played the pacifist son of Frank Conroy.

In 1943, he starred opposite Jennifer Jones in the Academy Award-winning film The Song of Bernadette, playing a man who is romantically interested in Bernadette (Jones).

Eythe was promoted to leading roles with The Eve of St. Mark (1944), opposite Anne Baxter, from a play by Maxwell Anderson. He played the juvenile lead in Wilson (1944), Fox's prestige picture of the year; it was a box office disappointment but Eythe's casting in the movie indicated the regard with which he was held at the studio.

Eythe was one of the three leads in a war film, Wing and a Prayer (1944), directed by Henry Hathaway, alongside Don Ameche and Dana Andrews. Eythe replaced Randolph Scott. He was to have appeared in Sunday Dinner for a Soldier but ended up being replaced by John Hodiak.

He was reunited with Baxter on A Royal Scandal (1945), directed by Otto Preminger (taking over from Ernst Lubitsch) and starring Tallulah Bankhead and Charles Coburn.

Eythe was then given the lead role in The House on 92nd Street (1945) playing double-agent Bill Dietrich (based on William G. Sebold). This was a semi-documentary directed by Henry Hathaway and was a big hit. He was announced for Doll Face with Vivian Blaine and a musical remake of The Bowery but neither were made.

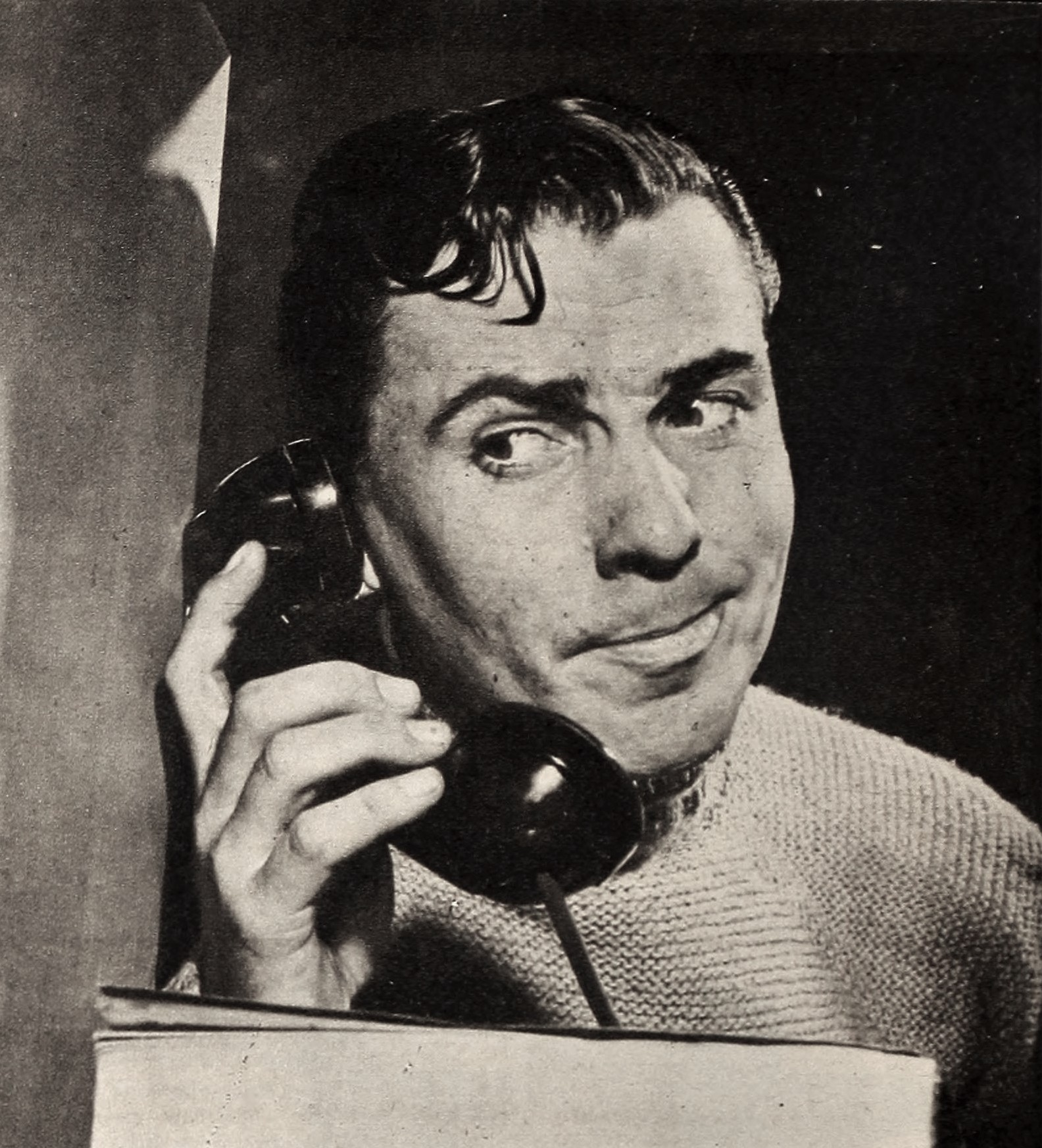
Eythe in 1946

Eythe was the romantic male lead in Colonel Effingham's Raid (1946), starring Coburn. He was billed fourth in Centennial Summer (1946), a musical directed by Preminger featuring Jeanne Crain, Cornel Wilde and Linda Darnell.

In 1946, he was one of eight Hollywood actors to give a performance in front of King George VI of the United Kingdom and his consort, Queen Elizabeth.

Eythe went to England where he starred in Meet Me at Dawn (1947), a swashbuckler produced by Marcel Hellman and released through Fox.

Fox then released him from his contract.

=== Pine-Thomas ===
He returned to Hollywood where he starred in Mr. Reckless (1948), a drama for Pine-Thomas, a low budget unit associated with Paramount. Pine-Thomas used him again for Special Agent (1949).

Eythe directed and appeared in a stage production of The Glass Menagerie.

=== Return to Broadway ===
Eythe returned to New York. He turned producer, buying the rights to the revue Lend an Ear and much revising it. It debuted in New York in 1948, the cast including Eythe and a young Carol Channing. It ran for 460 performances until 1950.

During the show run he began appearing in TV in episodes of The Philco-Goodyear Television Playhouse ("Dinner at Antoine's", "This Time, Next Year", an adaptation of "The Little Sister", "The Promise"). He announced he had bought the rights to the novel The Perfect Round by Henry Morton Robinson and wanted to turn it into a play. In November 1949 Eythe left the cast of Lend an Ear, replaced by John Beal. He returned to films with the lead role in a B film at Columbia, Customs Agent (1950). In 1950 he appeared in the musical The Liar, directed by Alfred Drake, which only had a short run. Eythe also appeared in a starring (though non-singing) role in the 1950 Cole Porter musical Out of this World, based on the Greek myth of Amphitryon, in which Jupiter (George Gaynes) comes to earth to bed a lovely young lady, taking the shape of her much-loved husband (Eythe). The song "From This Moment On", which went on to become a standard, was originally written for the couple.

=== Television ===
Eythe then focused on television. He was in episodes of Faith Baldwin Romance Theatre ("Follow Fat Flora"), Studio One in Hollywood ("Summer Had Better Be Good"), Armstrong Circle Theatre ("Fog Station"), Lux Video Theatre ("Dames are Poison"), Tales of Tomorrow ("The Invader", with Eva Gabor), Lights Out ("Sisters of Shadow", "Perchance to Dream"), Schlitz Playhouse ("The Haunted House"), and Hollywood Opening Night ("The Singing Years"). His last screen appearance was in The Ford Television Theatre ("Indirect Approach"). In 1953 he was in a stage production of Garson Kanin's The Live Wire.

=== Later career ===
Eythe became a professional photographer. He and his partner Lon McCallister toured the world producing films for the Hilton Hotel chain.

== Personal life ==
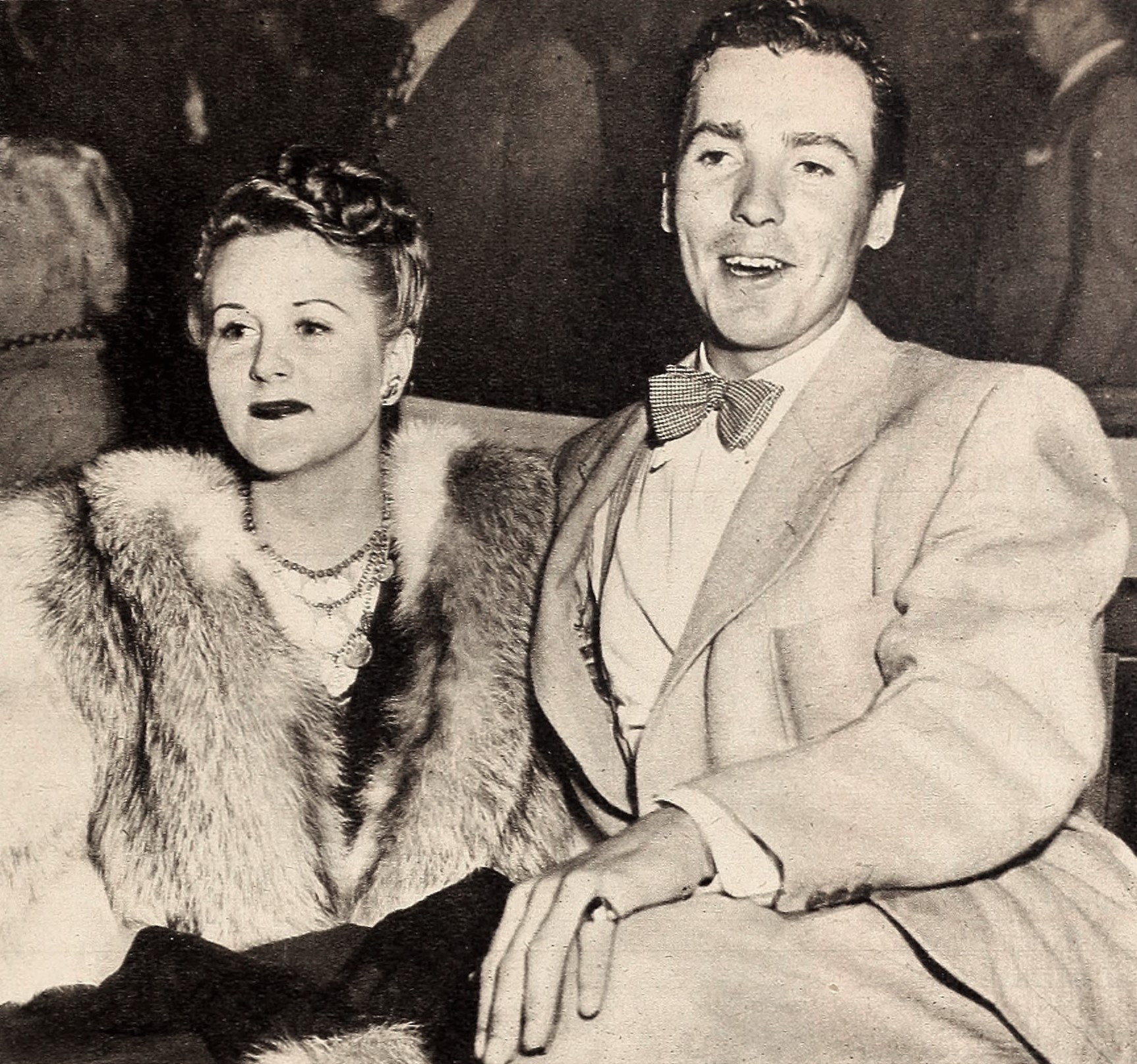
Eythe and Margaret Whiting, 1946

Eythe was romantically linked with Anne Baxter, June Haver, Margaret Whiting and movie actor Lon McCallister.

Eythe married a young 20th Century Fox contract actress, Buff Cobb, in June 1947. The marriage was short-lived and was not a happy one, and the couple divorced in 1949. Cobb later sued Eythe for $2,500 that he owed according to their divorce settlement. The unpaid debt resulted in Eythe's being arrested. "I suppose I do owe the money", he said. "I'm a bum book-keeper and a bum businessman".

Eythe lived with Lon McCallister from the early 1950s until his death. Carol Channing described McCallister as Eythe's "dearest friend".

== Death ==
Eythe was admitted to Good Samaritan Hospital in Los Angeles in January 1957 suffering from hepatitis. He died several weeks later at the age of 38.

== Partial filmography ==
- The Ox-Bow Incident (1943) – Gerald Tetley
- The Song of Bernadette (1943) – Antoine Nicolau
- The Eve of St. Mark (1944) – Pvt. Quizz West
- Wilson (1944) – George Felton
- Wing and a Prayer (1944) – Ens. Hallam 'Oscar' Scott
- A Royal Scandal (1945) – Lt. Alexei Chernoff
- The House on 92nd Street (1945) – Bill Dietrich
- Colonel Effingham's Raid (1946) – Albert 'Al' Marbury
- Centennial Summer (1946) – Ben Phelps
- Meet Me at Dawn (1947) – Charles Morton
- Mr. Reckless (1948) – Jeff Lundy
- Special Agent (1949) – Johnny Douglas
- Customs Agent (1950) – Bert Stewart
