= Special Agent (1949 film) =

1949 film by William C. Thomas

- Directed by: William C. Thomas
- Screenplay by: Whitman Chambers; Lewis R. Foster
- Story by: Milton Raison
- Produced by: William H. Pine; William C. Thomas
- Starring: William Eythe
- Cinematography: Ellis W. Carter
- Edited by: Howard A. Smith
- Music by: Lucien Cailliet
- Production company: Pine-Thomas Productions
- Distributed by: Paramount Pictures
- Release date: 22 July 1949
- Running time: 71 minutes
- Country: United States
- Language: English

Special Agent is a 1949 American film noir crime film directed by William C. Thomas and starring William Eythe. The storyline is loosely based on the DeAutremont Brothers' 1923 train robbery.

== Plot ==
With their farm in financial jeopardy, the Devereaux brothers, Ed and Paul, decide to rob a train. After their getaway, railroad detective Johnny Douglas arrives to investigate, with help from Lucille Peters, whose father was killed during the robbery.

== Cast ==
- William Eythe as Johnny Douglas
- Kasey Rogers as Lucille Peters
- Paul Valentine as Edmond Devereaux
- George Reeves as Paul Devereaux
- Carole Mathews as Rose McCreary
- Tom Powers as Chief Special Agent Wilcox
- Raymond Bond as Sheriff Babcock
- Frank Puglia as Grandfather Devereaux
- Walter Baldwin as Pop Peters
- Jeff York as Jake Rumpler
- Virginia Christine as Mabel Rumpler
- Robert Williams as Supt. Olmstead
- Joseph Granby as Sheriff Dodson
- Morgan Farley as Dr. Bowen
- John Hilton as Frank Kent
- Peter Miles as Jake Rumpler Jr
- Jimmy Hunt as Tim Rumpler
- Arthur Stone as Tad Miller
- Truman Bradley as Narrator
