= Gregory Marshall =

American actor

- Born: Gregory Muradian; April 4, 1939; Los Angeles County, California, U.S.
- Died: October 2, 1989 (aged 50); Orange, California, U.S.
- Occupation: Actor
- Years active: 1944–1958

Gregory Muradian (April 4, 1939 – October 2, 1989), known by his stage name Gregory Marshall, was an American actor whose career lasted from 1944 to 1958.

A native of Los Angeles County, Marshall was just past his fifth birthday when the first film in which he appeared, Roughly Speaking, a comedy-drama starring Rosalind Russell and Jack Carson, started production in April 1944, finishing in mid-July. Unbilled, briefly playing the son of Russell and Carson, his character was subsequently played as an older boy by the unbilled Johnny Sheffield and, as a teenager, by Robert Arthur.

During his first two years as an actor, he appeared in eight additional films, with small credited roles in 1945's Captain Eddie (playing young Eddie Rickenbacker's little brother, Dewey) and Strange Confession as well as 1946's The Bride Wore Boots and Child of Divorce. In 1947 he was given the stage name Gregory Marshall and appeared in supporting roles in four more films. There were seven additional films during 1948–1951, with on-screen credit in two, 1949's Adventure in Baltimore and 1951's The Blue Veil. Also in 1951, his television debut, at the age of 12, in an episode of The Adventures of Wild Bill Hickok, a western series aimed at pre-teens and young adolescents, was broadcast on December 30.

Marshall was seen in three films during 1952, but received billing in only one, Washington Story. Upon becoming a teenager, he found roles becoming scarce, with his only work in 1953 consisting of an episode of the popular William Bendix sitcom, The Life of Riley, playing Egbert Gillis, the son of Riley's best friend, Jim Gillis and, in 1954, there was one film, Tanganyika, along with a David Niven episode of CBS' Four Star Playhouse, airing on February 18.

Although he was one of three teenage actors, along with Richard Beymer and ultimate choice Sal Mineo, tested by director Nicholas Ray for the key supporting role of the protagonist's sensitive friend Plato in 1955's Rebel Without a Cause, there was no work for him that year and the sole acting assignment in 1956 was another appearance as Egbert on The Life of Riley. His career was nearly over in 1957, with a 9th-billed role in the juvenile delinquency exploitation drama, Teenage Thunder. His final three screen acting roles came the following year, with another turn as Egbert on The Life of Riley, an episode of the syndicated series The Silent Service and an unbilled bit in the attempted revival of the Andy Hardy film series, Andy Hardy Comes Home. At the age of 19, his acting career had come to an end.

Marshall died in California's Orange County city of Orange six months past his 50th birthday.
