= Tanganyika (film) =

1954 film by André de Toth

- Film poster by Reynold Brown
- Directed by: Andre de Toth
- Screenplay by: William Sackheim; Richard Alan Simmons
- Story by: William R. Cox
- Produced by: Albert J. Cohen
- Starring: Van Heflin; Ruth Roman; Howard Duff
- Cinematography: Maury Gertsman
- Edited by: Al Clark,
- Music by: Joseph Gershenson
- Production company: Universal International Pictures
- Distributed by: Universal International Pictures
- Release date: June 18, 1954 (New York)
- Running time: 81 minutes
- Country: United States
- Language: English
- Box office: $1.3 million

Tanganyika is a 1954 American Technicolor action adventure film directed by Andre de Toth and starring Van Heflin, Ruth Roman and Howard Duff. It was produced and distributed by Universal Pictures.

== Plot ==
In 1903 in the British colonial region adjoining German East Africa (a portion of which was referenced as Tanganyika), tough American colonist John Gale is leading a safari to capture escaped murderer Abel McCracken, who is inciting the Nukumbi tribe and endangering Gale's holdings.

En route, Gale rescues four survivors of a Nukumbi raid: Dan Harder (who is secretly McCracken's brother), former teacher Peggy and the two orphaned children of her brother who was killed in the raid. Gale hopes to stake a claim on a valuable piece of land. The Nukumbi are lying in wait and eventually Gale and McCracken meet in man-to-man combat.

== Cast ==
- Van Heflin as John Gale
- Ruth Roman as Peggy
- Howard Duff as Dan Harder McCracken
- Jeff Morrow as Abel McCracken
- Joe Comadore as Andolo
- Noreen Corcoran as Sally
- Gregory Marshall as Andy
- Naaman Brown as Nukumbi Prisoner
- Edward C. Short as Head Porter
- Murray Alper as Paul Duffy
- Jester Hairston as Singer

== Reception ==
In a contemporary review for The New York Times, critic Howard Thompson called Tanganyika a "standard safari exercise" and wrote: "These glimpses of animal and tribal behavior and the lush horizons superimposed on the Universal back lot only stress the cardboard nature of the scenario credited to William Sackheim and Richard Alan Simmons, and a story which William R. Cox obviously didn't get from Dr. Livingstone. The savage-beast encounters occur right on schedule, and in the absurd climax, dynamite, no less, saves the day. And director Andre de Toth, usually alert, allows the pace to lag continually."
