= Enchantment (1948 film) =

1948 romantic film directed by Irving Reis

- Directed by: Irving Reis
- Screenplay by: John Patrick
- Based on: A Fugue in Time by Rumer Godden
- Produced by: Samuel Goldwyn
- Starring: David Niven; Teresa Wright; Evelyn Keyes; Farley Granger
- Narrated by: William Johnstone
- Cinematography: Gregg Toland
- Edited by: Daniel Mandell
- Music by: Hugo Friedhofer
- Production company: Samuel Goldwyn Productions
- Distributed by: RKO Radio Pictures
- Release date: December 11, 1948
- Running time: 100 minutes
- Country: United States
- Language: English
- Box office: $1.6 million

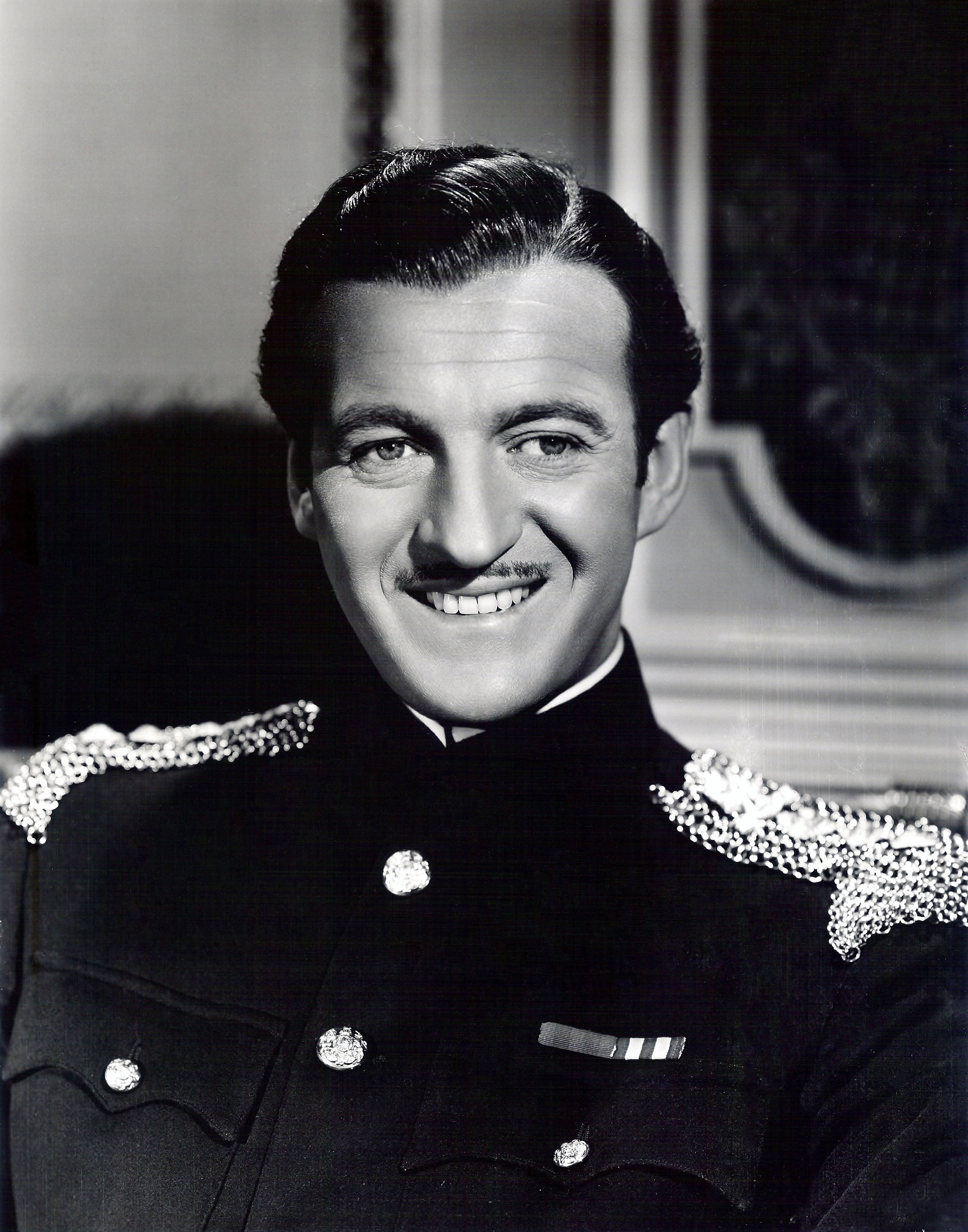
David Niven in the film

Enchantment is a 1948 American romantic drama film directed by Irving Reis and starring David Niven, Teresa Wright and Evelyn Keyes. It was produced by Samuel Goldwyn, and based on the 1945 novel A Fugue in Time by Rumer Godden.

== Plot ==
In World War II London, a bold American servicewoman named Grizel Dane (Evelyn Keyes) pays a visit to her granduncle, aged General Sir Roland 'Rollo' Dane (David Niven), looking for a place to stay.

Interspersed flashbacks reveal the history of the Dane family. The first takes place when Rollo (Peter Miles) is a child. He and his older siblings, Selina (Sherlee Collier) and Pelham (Warwick Gregson), are introduced to Lark Ingoldsby (Gigi Perreau) by their father (Colin Keith-Johnston). He explains that her parents have been killed in the Tay Bridge disaster and that she will be living with them as a member of the family. Selina immediately resents the newcomer.

The second flashback occurs when the children have grown up. Roland's father has died, leaving Selina (played as an adult by Jayne Meadows) in charge of Lark (Teresa Wright), whom she treats like a servant. Rollo (David Niven) returns on leave from the army. When Lark asks Pelham (Philip Friend) for a dress, the first that would not be a hand-me-down from Selina, he realizes that she is growing up and invites her to a dance. She becomes acquainted with the Marchese Guido Del Laudi (Shepperd Strudwick), a business associate of Pelham's.

In the last flashback, Lark is being courted by the Marchese. Pelham reveals his love for her with a kiss, but she does not love him. Rollo surprises everyone by returning early from his latest posting on Lark's birthday. Rollo and Lark acknowledge their love for each other, but Selina has arranged for General Fitzgerald (Henry Stephenson) to appoint Rollo to his staff for a five-year mission to Afghanistan. However, Lark refuses to wait that long, living uneasily with both Selina and Pelham. When Rollo is indecisive, she goes up to her room. Rollo refuses the appointment, but Selina tells Lark that he has decided to take the job. When he does not return by the next morning, Lark is convinced and leaves to marry the Marchese. Rollo returns too late, finding a letter Lark wrote in which she says, "Selina was right." Furious at his sister's meddling, Rollo vows never to enter the house again while she lives. The poem "Dover Beach" by Matthew Arnold features prominently in the film.

In the story set in World War II, ambulance driver Grizel transports injured Pilot Officer Pax Masterson (Farley Granger) to a hospital. Later, she finds him in the general's house and learns that he is Lark's nephew. As time goes on, they start falling in love. When Pax receives his orders, he asks her to marry him, but she is daunted by the uncertainties of war. As Pax is leaving, Rollo hands him a telegram addressed to him; it announces that Lark died the month before. Rollo persuades Grizel not to throw away the chance for love as he did. She runs after Pax in the middle of a bombing raid and embraces him. While she is away, a bomb demolishes the house and kills Rollo.

== Cast ==
- David Niven as General Sir Roland 'Rollo' Dane
- Teresa Wright as Lark Ingoldsby
- Evelyn Keyes as Grizel Dane
- Farley Granger as Pilot Officer Pax Masterson
- Jayne Meadows as Selina Dane
- Leo G. Carroll as Proutie, the Dane family butler
- Philip Friend as Pelham Dane
- Shepperd Strudwick as the Marchese Guido Del Laudi
- Henry Stephenson as General Fitzgerald
- Colin Keith-Johnston as Mr. Dane, the father of the Dane children
- Gigi Perreau as Lark as a child
- Peter Miles as Rollo as a child. Peter is Gigi Perreau's older brother.
- Sherlee Collier as Selina as a child
- Warwick Gregson as Pelham as a child
- Marjorie Rhodes as Mrs Sampson
- Edmund Breon as Uncle Bunny
- Gerald Oliver Smith as Willoughby
- Melville Cooper as Jones, the jeweller
- Matthew Boulton as Air Raid Warden
- William Johnstone as Narrator (voice)

== Reception ==
The Brooklyn Eagle found the film "beautifully packaged...a Christmas gift for all those who prefer their love stories told between sighs and suppressed tears, told with an artful catch in the throat." The acting and direction were praised overall – "the entire film is marked by excellent taste" – while still finding the film "a little bit too well-bred, a little too correct, on the bloodless side, you might say." Columnist Hedda Hopper reported that "the film lives up to its title. It has charm, romance, and pathos....Samuel Goldwyn has done it again." It was the highest-grossing film in Italy in 1957.
