= Week-End with Father =

1951 film by Douglas Sirk

- Directed by: Douglas Sirk
- Screenplay by: Joseph Hoffman
- Based on: George F. Slavin; George W. George
- Produced by: Ted Richmond
- Starring: Van Heflin; Patricia Neal; Gigi Perreau
- Cinematography: Clifford Stine
- Edited by: Russell F. Schoengarth
- Music by: Frank Skinner
- Production company: Universal Pictures
- Distributed by: Universal Pictures
- Release date: January 4, 1952 (Los Angeles)
- Running time: 83 minutes
- Country: United States
- Language: English
- Box office: $1.25 million (U.S. rentals)

Week-End with Father is a 1951 American comedy film directed by Douglas Sirk and starring Van Heflin, Patricia Neal and Gigi Perreau.

== Plot ==
Widower Brad Stubbs and widow Jean Bowen meet at Grand Central Station while sending their children to summer camp. After another chance encounter, Brad and Jean begin dating and are soon engaged. When Brad attempts to end his relationship with Phyllis Reynolds, an actress, she misunderstands and thinks that he wants to marry her.

Brad and Jean travel to the camp for a parents' weekend. Handsome camp counselor and health freak Don Adams is attracted to Jean, and the kids mock Brad's lack of prowess at outdoor activities.

Phyllis appears at the camp, shocking Jean when she claims to be Brad's fiancée. Her meddling drives Brad and Jean apart, but the children help to bring them together again.

== Cast ==
- Van Heflin as Brad Stubbs
- Patricia Neal as Jean Bowen
- Gigi Perreau as Anne Stubbs
- Virginia Field as Phyllis Reynolds
- Richard Denning as Don Adams
- Jimmy Hunt as Gary Bowen
- Tommy Rettig as David Bowen
- Janine Perreau as Patty Stubbs
- Gary Pagett as Eddie Lewis
- Forrest Lewis as Clarence Willett
- Frances E. Williams as Cleo
- Elvia Allman as Mrs. G

== Reception ==
In a contemporary review for the Los Angeles Times, critic Grace Kingsley wrote: "Comedy is all pretty natural in this feature; seldom drops to farce. It is a bright and pleasing affair. ... There is a lot of bright dialogue and the acting is perfect on the part of everyone. ... [I]t should especially attract all who like a wholesome comedy with family appeal."

== See also ==
- List of American films of 1951
