= Customs Agent =

1950 film by Seymour Friedman

- Directed by: Seymour Friedman
- Written by: Harold Jacob Smith; Russell S. Hughes; Malcolm Stuart Boylan
- Produced by: Rudolph C. Flothow
- Starring: William Eythe; Marjorie Reynolds; Griff Barnett
- Cinematography: Philip Tannura
- Edited by: Aaron Stell
- Music by: Mischa Bakaleinikoff
- Production company: Columbia Pictures
- Distributed by: Columbia Pictures
- Release date: May 18, 1950
- Running time: 71 minutes
- Country: United States
- Language: English

Customs Agent is a 1950 American thriller film directed by Seymour Friedman and starring William Eythe, Marjorie Reynolds and Griff Barnett.

== Plot ==
In Shanghai, an American customs agent hunts a drug-smuggling outfit that killed his predecessor.

== Cast ==
- William Eythe as Bert Stewart
- Marjorie Reynolds as Lucille Gerrard
- Griff Barnett as Charles McGraw
- Howard St. John as Charles Johnson
- Jim Backus as Shanghai Chief Agent Thomas Jacoby
- Robert Shayne as West Coast Chief Agent J.G. Goff
- Denver Pyle as Al

== Bibliography ==
- Blottner, Gene. Columbia Noir: A Complete Filmography, 1940-1962. McFarland, 2015.
