= Dennis Joel =

American former child actor and singer (1947–2006)

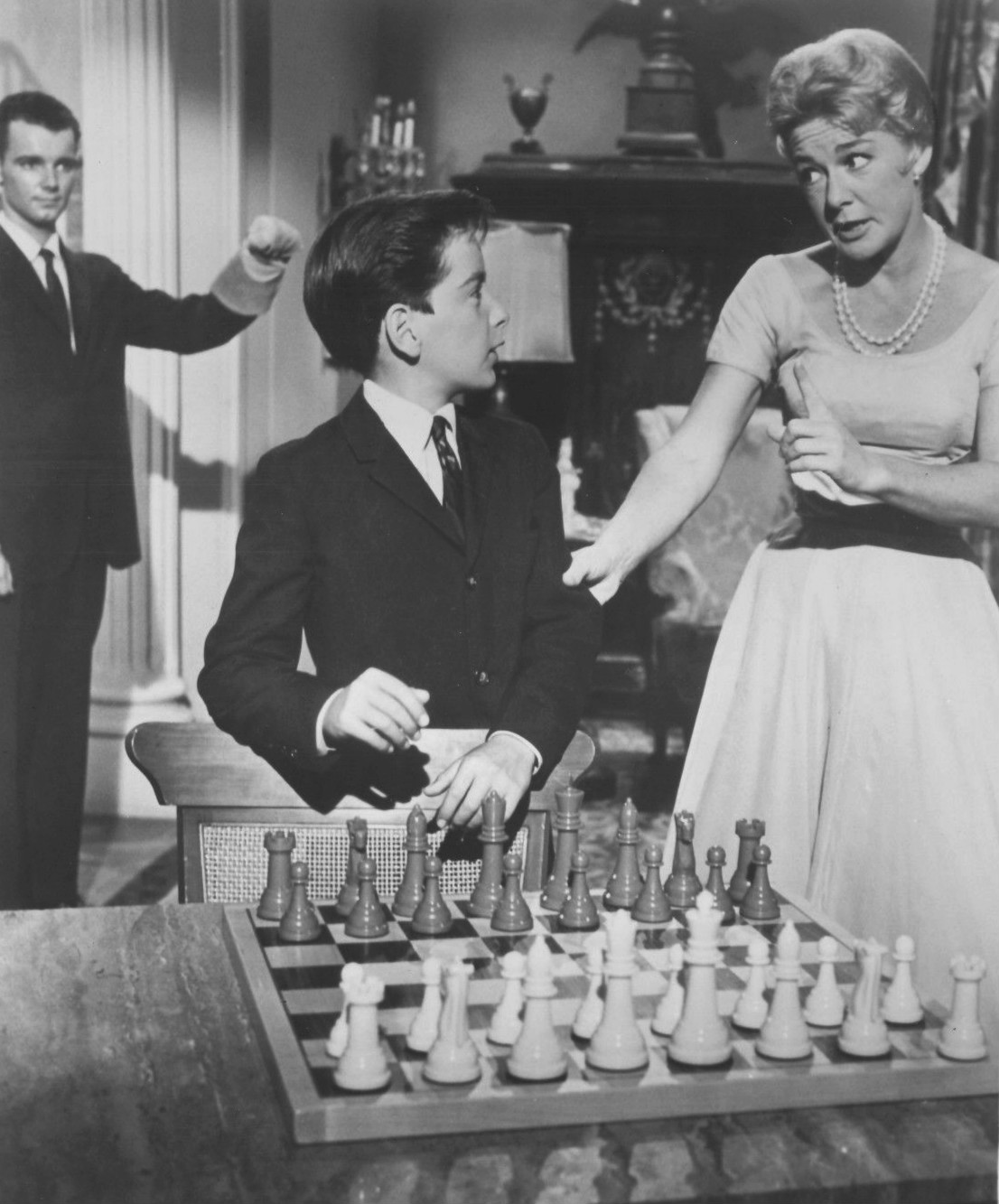
- Richard Miles, Joel and Betty Hutton on The Betty Hutton Show.
- Born: Dennis Joel Olivieri; August 29, 1947; Garfield, New Jersey, U.S.
- Died: September 27, 2006 (aged 59)
- Other name: Dennis Olivieri
- Occupations: Actor, Singer
- Years active: 1952–1980

Dennis Joel (born Dennis Joel Olivieri, August 29, 1947 – September 27, 2006) was an American child actor and singer.

== Early years ==
The son of Mr. and Mrs. Alphonse Olivieri of Garfield, New Jersey, Joel attended Our Lady of Mount Virgin School before he moved to California with his mother and older brother. Beginning at age 5, he worked as a model for the Walter Thornton Agency. He began performing when at age 8 he sang a radio jingle for the local Yoo-hoo beverage company owned by his father, Natale Olivieri.

== Career ==
On Broadway, Joel went from being an understudy to portraying Patrick Dennis as a boy in Auntie Mame (1956). He continued in that role in a road company production and a West Coast production.

On television, Joel played Roy Strickland on The Betty Hutton Show, a situation comedy on CBS. He also appeared on Walt Disney Presents and The DuPont Show with June Allyson and did commercials on local TV. Billed as Dennis Olivieri, he portrayed Stanley on The New People and appeared in the made-for-TV film The Whole World Is Waiting. Joel starred in the S5 E37 "Long Distance Call" episode of Leave It To Beaver. Ray Montgomery played his newspaper editor father.

His work in films included playing Ajax in Toby Tyler (1960).

Joel's personal appearances included co-starring with Hutton in a variety show that ran for 10 weeks at the Sahara Hotel in Las Vegas. He made three 45 rpm recordings on the Tape label and recorded one album on the VMC label.
