= Song of Surrender =

1949 film by Mitchell Leisen

- Directed by: Mitchell Leisen
- Written by: Ruth McKenney; Richard Bransten; Richard Maibaum
- Produced by: Richard Maibaum
- Starring: Wanda Hendrix; Claude Rains; Macdonald Carey
- Cinematography: Daniel L. Fapp
- Edited by: Alma Macrorie
- Music by: Victor Young
- Production company: Paramount Pictures
- Distributed by: Paramount Pictures
- Release date: October 28, 1949
- Running time: 93 minutes
- Country: United States
- Language: English

Song of Surrender is a 1949 American period drama film directed by Mitchell Leisen and starring Wanda Hendrix, Claude Rains and Macdonald Carey. It was produced and distributed by Paramount Pictures.

== Plot ==
Connecticut, 1906. Farmer's daughter Abigail marries the much older Elisha Hunt, the curator of the local museum. Finding that they have little in common, she is drawn to the wealthy Bruce Eldridge.

== Cast ==
- Wanda Hendrix as Abigail Hunt
- Claude Rains as Elisha Hunt
- Macdonald Carey as Bruce Eldridge
- Andrea King as Phyllis Cantwell
- Henry Hull as Deacon Perry
- Gordon Richards as Clayton
- Elizabeth Patterson as Mrs. Beecham
- Art Smith as Mr. Willis
- John Beal as Dubois
- Eva Gabor as Countess Marina
- Dan Tobin as Clyde Atherton
- Nicholas Joy as General Seckle
- Peter Miles as Simon Beecham
- Ray Walker as Auctioneer
- Gigi Perreau as Faith Beecham
- Ray Bennett as Mr. Beecham
- Clancy Cooper as Mr. Torrance
- Georgia Backus as Mrs. Parry
- Mary Young as Miss Rivercomb
- Houseley Stevenson as Mr. Abernathy

== Bibliography ==
- Skal, David J. & Rains, Jessica. Claude Rains: An Actor's Voice. University Press of Kentucky, 2008.
