= Louisa (film) =

1950 film by Alexander Hall

- Directed by: Alexander Hall
- Written by: Stanley Roberts
- Produced by: Robert Arthur
- Starring: Ronald Reagan; Charles Coburn; Ruth Hussey; Edmund Gwenn; Spring Byington; Piper Laurie; Scotty Beckett
- Cinematography: Maury Gertsman
- Edited by: Milton Carruth
- Music by: Frank Skinner
- Production company: Universal International Pictures
- Distributed by: Universal Pictures
- Release date: May 31, 1950
- Running time: 90 minutes
- Country: United States
- Language: English
- Box office: $1.4 million

Louisa is a 1950 American comedy film directed by Alexander Hall, and starring Spring Byington, Ronald Reagan, Charles Coburn, Ruth Hussey, Edmund Gwenn, and Scotty Beckett. It was produced and distributed by Universal Pictures. This was also Piper Laurie's film debut.

The film was nominated for the Academy Award for Best Sound (Leslie I. Carey).

== Plot ==
Grandma Louisa begins dating grocer Henry Hammond, much to the disgust of her son Hal and the rest of the family. Hal's boss Mr. Burnside becomes Hammond's rival for Louisa's affections.

== Cast ==
- Ronald Reagan as Hal Norton
- Charles Coburn as Mr. Burnside
- Ruth Hussey as Meg Norton
- Edmund Gwenn as Mr. Hammond
- Spring Byington as Louisa Norton
- Piper Laurie as Cathy Norton
- Scotty Beckett as Jimmy Blake
- Jimmy Hunt as Chris Norton
- Connie Gilchrist as Gladys
- Willard Waterman as Dick Stewart
- Marjorie Crossland as Lil Stewart
- Martin Milner as Bob Stewart
- Terry Frost as Stacy Walker
- Dave Willock as Joe Collins

== Reception ==
In a contemporary review for The New York Times, critic Bosley Crowther wrote: "Stanley Roberts has written and Universal-International has produced a thoroughly congenial family comedy in this iconoclastic little film and Alexander Hall has directed it in a nimble and unpretentious style. And, what's best, Spring Byington plays it with deliciously venturesome bounce, ably and winningly assisted by Charles Coburn and Edmund Gwenn. Apparently what Mr. Roberts had in mind when he wrote this film was the loneliness to which older people who have lost their accustomed mates are prone. Only he didn't let the pathos of the prospect get him down. Rather he let it inspire him to look on the brighter side."
