= Mona McKinnon =

American actress (1929–1990)

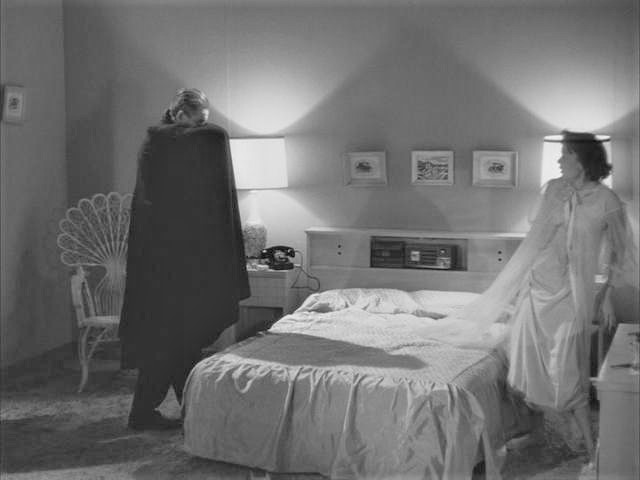
- Mona McKinnon in Plan 9 From Outer Space
- Born: May 1, 1929; Tennessee, U.S.
- Died: March 12, 1990 (aged 60); Los Angeles, California, U.S.
- Occupation: Actress
- Years active: 1950s

Mona McKinnon (May 1, 1929 – March 12, 1990) was an American film actress and model mostly active in the 1950s.

== Selected filmography ==
- Mesa of Lost Women (1953) as Lost Woman
- Jail Bait (1954) as Miss Willis
- Teenage Thunder (1958) as Betty's sister
- Unwed Mother (1958)
- Plan 9 From Outer Space (1959) as Paula Trent
- Night of the Ghouls (1959) as Juvenile Delinquent Girl
