= The Betty Hutton Show =

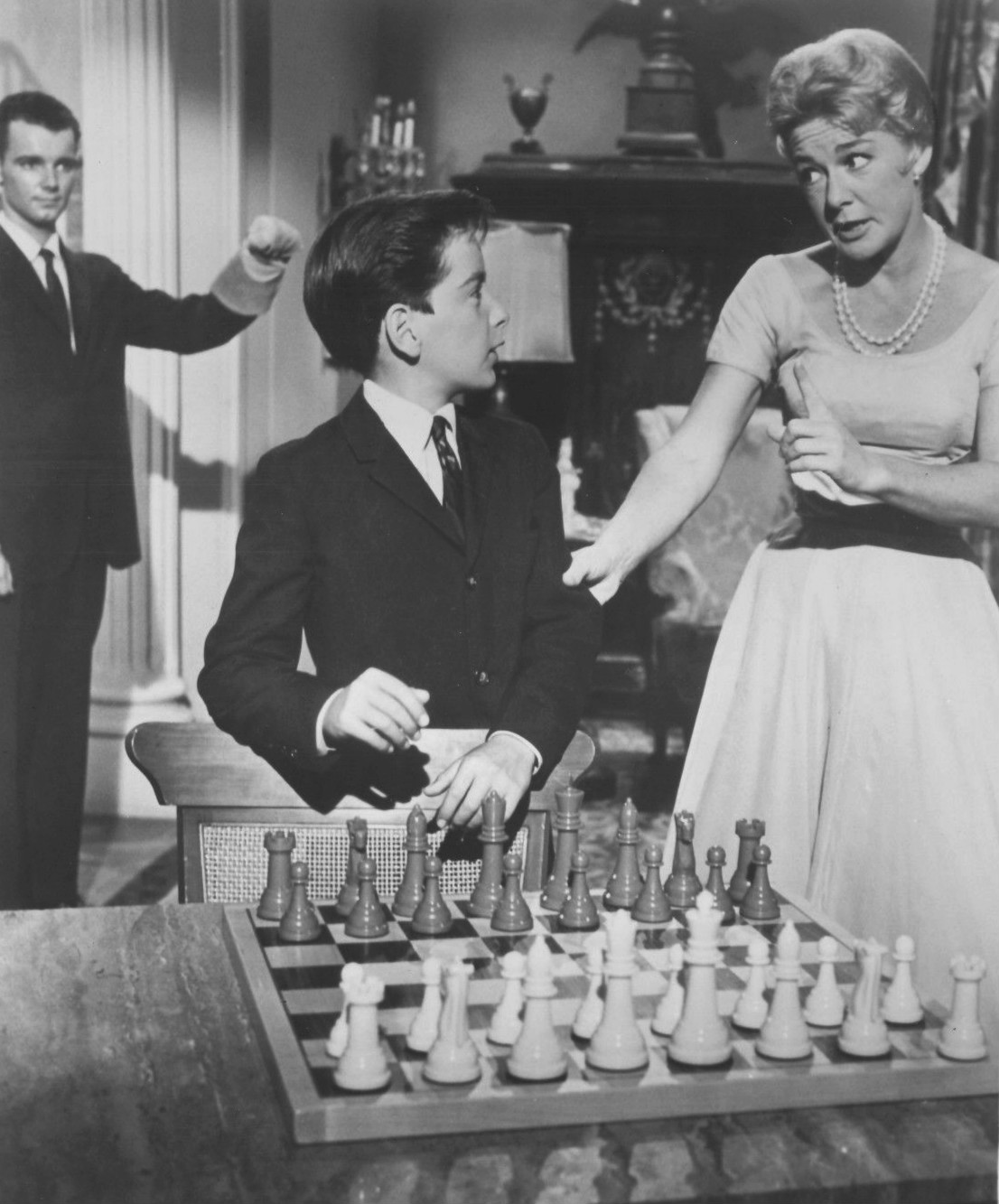
- Richard Miles, Dennis Joel and Betty Hutton in a scene from the show, 1959.
- Also known as: Goldie
- Genre: Sitcom
- Created by: Stanley Roberts
- Written by: Ed Jurist; Laurence Marks; Stanley Roberts; Terry Ryan
- Directed by: H. Bruce Humberstone; Robert Sidney; Jodie Copelan
- Starring: Betty Hutton; Gigi Perreau; Richard Miles; Dennis Joel; David White
- Theme music composer: Jerry Fielding
- Opening theme: "Goldie"
- Composer: Jerry Fielding
- Country of origin: United States
- Original language: English
- No. of seasons: 1
- No. of episodes: 30

Production
- Producers: William Harmon; Marvin Marx; L.B. "Doc" Merman
- Cinematography: Charles Van Enger
- Running time: 22–24 minutes
- Production company: Hutton Productions

Original release
- Network: CBS
- Release: October 1, 1959 – June 30, 1960

The Betty Hutton Show is an American sitcom that aired from October 1, 1959, until June 30, 1960, on CBS's Thursday schedule (8–8:30 pm Eastern). The show was sponsored by General Foods' Post Cereals, and was produced by Desilu and Hutton Productions.

The series, which was originally entitled Goldie, would retain its original title during its syndication run.

== Synopsis ==
Hutton stars as Goldie, a showgirl-turned-manicurist. One of Goldie's regular customers is a millionaire, Mr. Strickland. After he suddenly dies, Goldie discovers that he has left everything he owns, including his $60 million fortune and his three children, to her. The children were a 12-year-old boy and girl and boy teenagers.

== Characters ==
- Betty Hutton as Goldie Appleby
- David White as Mr. Strickland
- Gigi Perreau as Pat Strickland
- Peter Miles as Nicky Strickland
- Dennis Joel as Roy Strickland
- Tom Conway as Howard Seaton
- Gavin Muir as Hollister
- Norma Varden as Aunt Louise
- Jean Carson as Rosemary
- Joan Shawlee as Lorna

Guest stars included Don Grady, Dennis Hopper, Phil Harris, and Cesar Romero.

== Production ==
In addition to being the star, Hutton "insisted on creative control of everything from writing to directing to designing", which resulted in the resignations of three producers and two directors. Becker wrote, "by the season's midpoint, Hutton was largely producing the show alone".

Stanley Roberts created The Betty Hutton Show., and William Harmon was a producer. Directors included Jodie Copeland, Jerry Hopper, Richard Kinon, and Robert Sidney. Writers included Ralph Goodman, Ed Jurist, Bob Kaufman, Kip King, Philip Lloyd, Laurence Marks, Marvin Marx, and Jack Wilson. Jerry Fielding composed the theme song.

Thirty episodes were filmed in black and white with a laugh track. Hutton owned the company that produced the program, which was filmed by Desilu. Post Cereals sponsored the program.

== Reception and cancellation ==
Although Hutton was a popular actress, the show only lasted for thirty episodes before being cancelled, mainly because it was scheduled opposite ABC's popular series The Donna Reed Show. In a short review of the first episode, John P. Shanley wrote in The New York Times, "Miss Hutton worked conscientiously but the show was just another trifling addition to television's roster of mediocre situation comedies."

Christine Becker, in her book It's the Pictures That Got Small: Hollywood Film Stars on 1950s Television, wrote that the show's premise of combining sudden single parenthood with inheriting millions of dollars "was decidedly unconventional at a time when domestic sitcoms were supposed to feature an approximation of the cohesive, middle-class suburban nuclear family so desired by sponsors and networks."

== Episodes ==
No.	Title	Directed by	Written by	Original release date
1	"Goldie Crosses the Tracks"	Edward Ludwig	Stanley Roberts	October 1, 1959
2	"Goldie and the 400"	Unknown	Unknown	October 8, 1959
3	"Goldie Goes to a Dog Show"	Unknown	Unknown	October 15, 1959
4	"Goldie Knots the Old School Tie"	Unknown	Unknown	October 22, 1959
5	"Who Killed Vaudeville?"	Unknown	Unknown	October 29, 1959
6	"Goldie Goes Broke"	Bruce Humberstone	Marvin Marx & Robert Van Scoyk & Terry Ryan	November 5, 1959
7	"Goldie's Playground"	Unknown	Unknown	November 12, 1959
8	"Nicky's First Love"	Unknown	Unknown	November 19, 1959
9	"Hollister's Mother"	Unknown	Unknown	November 26, 1959
10	"Art for Goldie's Sake"	Robert Sidney	Laurence Marks & Ed Jurist and Marvin Marx	December 3, 1959
11	"Jenny"	Robert Sidney	Marvin Marx and Hugh King	December 17, 1959
12	"The Christmas Story"	Unknown	Unknown	December 24, 1959
13	"Goldie Goes to Court"	Unknown	Unknown	December 31, 1959
14	"Love Comes to Goldie"	Robert Sidney	Story by : Betty Hutton & Marvin Marx; Teleplay by : Hugh Wedlock & Howard Snyder	January 7, 1960
15	"Goldie's Birthday Party"	Unknown	Unknown	January 14, 1960
16	"Roy Runs Away"	Robert Sidney	Laurence Marks & Ed Jurist	January 21, 1960
17	"Rock 'n' Roll"	Unknown	Unknown	January 28, 1960
18	"Goldie and the Tycoon"	Robert Sidney	Dick Conway & Roland MacLane	February 4, 1960
19	"Goldie Meets Betty Hutton"	Unknown	Unknown	February 11, 1960
20	"Rosemary's Romance"	Unknown	Unknown	February 18, 1960
21	"The Cold War"	Unknown	Unknown	February 25, 1960
22	"Goldie Gets Amnesia"	Unknown	Unknown	March 3, 1960
23	"The Seaton Story"	Robert Sidney	Story by : Bob Kaufman; Teleplay by : Jack Wilson	March 10, 1960
24	"Goldie Meets Mike"	Unknown	Unknown	March 17, 1960
25	"Daddy Goldie"	Unknown	Unknown	March 24, 1960
26	"Gullible Goldie"	Jodie Copelan	Story by : Ralph Goodman & Philip Lloyd; Teleplay by : Ralph Goodman & Philip Lloyd and Kip King	March 31, 1960
27	"The School Bully"	Jodie Copelan	Barbara Hammer and Henry Sharp	April 7, 1960
28	"The Flashback Story"	Jodie Copelan	Betty Hutton	April 14, 1960
29	"Goldie Without Men"	Unknown	Unknown	April 28, 1960
30	"Goldie on 'Face to Face'"	Unknown	Unknown	May 5, 1960

== Home release ==
Four episodes of the show were released on DVD by Alpha Video on July 31, 2007.
