= The Red Pony (1949 film) =

1949 American Drama film by Lewis Milestone

- Theatrical release poster
- Directed by: Lewis Milestone
- Screenplay by: John Steinbeck
- Based on: The Red Pony; 1937 novel by John Steinbeck
- Produced by: Lewis Milestone
- Starring: Myrna Loy; Robert Mitchum; Louis Calhern; Shepperd Strudwick; Peter Miles; Margaret Hamilton
- Cinematography: Tony Gaudio
- Edited by: Harry Keller
- Music by: Aaron Copland
- Color process: Technicolor
- Production companies: Republic Pictures; Charles K. Feldman Group; Lewis Milestone Productions
- Distributed by: Republic Pictures
- Release date: March 28, 1949 (United States)
- Running time: 89 minutes
- Country: United States
- Language: English
- Budget: $2 million or $1,913,436

The Red Pony is a 1949 American Technicolor drama film directed by Lewis Milestone and starring Myrna Loy, Robert Mitchum and Louis Calhern. It is based on John Steinbeck's 1937 novella of the same name. Steinbeck also wrote the screenplay for this film. It was distributed by Republic Pictures.

== Plot ==
The Tiflin family live in a remote ranch in the Salinas Valley in California. Tom Tiflin, a young boy, is given a small pony by his father, Fred Tiflin. His grandfather tells rambling and exaggerated tales of the west over meal times. Fred is tired of his stories but his daughter (Fred's wife) likes his eccentricity. Most of his stories revolve around his leading a wagon train cross country in the pioneer days.

Tom asks stable-helper Billy Buck (Mitchum) to help him raise and train the pony so that it can be ridden. Buck gives him a saddle and they name the pony Gabilan. Tom shows the pony to his young friends.

During a rainstorm, the pony escapes the stable and subsequently develops a fever. Despite Buck's efforts to nurse the pony, it develops strangles and requires a tracheotomy. Shortly after the procedure, the pony escapes from the farm. Tom follows the pony's hoofprints to a gully where it has died and is being eaten by vultures. He blames Buck for not saving the pony's life. Buck, feeling remorse, prepares to kill his own pregnant mare in order to give Tom a colt. Tom grows angry at Buck's willingness to sacrifice a horse and steals his knife. When they return to the stable, the foal has been born naturally, with both mother and colt surviving.

== Cast ==
- Myrna Loy as Alice Tiflin
- Robert Mitchum as Billy Buck
- Louis Calhern as Grandfather
- Shepperd Strudwick as Fred Tiflin
- Peter Miles as Tom Tiflin
- Margaret Hamilton as Teacher
- Patty King as Jinx Ingals
- Jackie Jackson as Jackie
- Beau Bridges as Beau
- Little Brown Jug as Little Brown Jug
- Nino Tempo as Nino
- Tommy Sheridan as Dale

Uncredited (in order of appearance)
Wee Willie Davis	truck driver
George Tyne	Charlie
Poodles Hanneford	clown
Eddie Borden	circus performer
Max Wagner	bartender

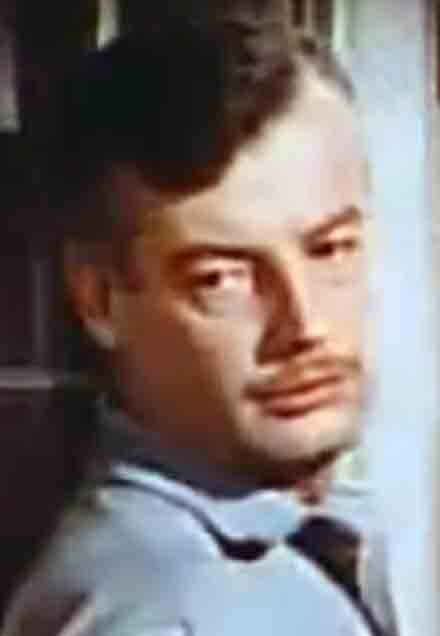
Shepperd Strudwick in trailer for The Red Pony

== Screenplay adaptation ==
In adapting his novella into a screenplay, Steinbeck focused mainly on the chapters "The Gift" and "The Promise," and characters' names were changed from those in the book: Jody Tiflin became Tom and his parents Carl and Ruth became Fred and Alice. The film also features a much happier ending than does the novella; in the book, Billy Buck cannot deliver the foal naturally and kills the mare to perform a caesarean section to save the unborn foal. Other violent scenes, such as those in which Jody beats a vulture to death, were toned down or omitted entirely for the film adaptation.

Film rights for the novel were $250,000.

== Music ==
The film is notable because of the original score composed by Aaron Copland, which he also arranged and published as an orchestral suite. Copland conducted London's New Philharmonia Orchestra in a recording of the music for Columbia Records, which was later reissued on CD by Sony Records.

== Reception ==
=== Critical reception ===
In a contemporary review for The New York Times, film critic Bosley Crowther wrote: "[T]he story does ramble, and its several interlaced strands are often permitted to dangle or get lost in the leisurely account. An extraneous family situation involving the youngster's Ma and Pa, wherein the father has trouble with his ego, likewise confuses the plot. In directing the picture, Mr. Milestone has adopted a frankly casual style which further invests the proceedings with a languid quality."

=== Accolades ===
The film was nominated by the American Film Institute for its 2005 AFI's 100 Years of Film Scores list.

== See also ==
- List of films about horses
