= The Long Night (1947 film) =

1947 film by Anatole Litvak

- theatrical release poster
- Directed by: Anatole Litvak
- Screenplay by: John Wexley
- Based on: Le jour se lève 1939 film by Jacques Viot
- Produced by: Anatole Litvak; Raymond Hakim; Robert Hakim
- Starring: Henry Fonda; Barbara Bel Geddes; Vincent Price; Ann Dvorak
- Cinematography: Sol Polito
- Edited by: Robert Swink
- Music by: Dimitri Tiomkin
- Distributed by: RKO Pictures
- Release date: August 6, 1947 (U.S.)
- Running time: 101 minutes
- Country: United States
- Language: English

The Long Night is a 1947 American film noir crime-tragedy directed by Anatole Litvak and produced by RKO Pictures. It is a remake of Le jour se lève (1939) by Marcel Carné. The drama stars Henry Fonda, Barbara Bel Geddes, Vincent Price and Ann Dvorak. The title of the original French film is an idiom which translates roughly as "dawn is breaking".

The Long Night was the first screen appearance by character actress Barbara Bel Geddes and it served as a springboard for Bel Geddes's career. RKO signed Bel Geddes to a seven-year contract.

== Plot ==
A dead man tumbles down a flight of stairs. When the police arrive at the top-floor apartment of Joe Adams, he shoots at them through the door.

The sheriff calls in reinforcements and sets up snipers on nearby rooftops. Adams, in his room, begins a recollection of the events leading up to this, beginning with his first chance encounter with Jo Ann, who works in a greenhouse. It turns out they had been raised in the same orphanage.

The story unfolds in a series of flashbacks, and even a flashback within a flashback, as Joe recalls what Jo Ann told him about her life before they met.

Finding her behavior suspicious, he follows her to a nightclub where Maximilian the Great is performing a magic act on stage. At the bar, Joe gets to know Charlene, who recently quit as Max's assistant.

Max tells Joe that he is Jo Ann's long-lost father. He claims to have sought her out due to guilt and is now so attached to her that he would not want to lose her to someone like Joe.

Jo Ann fiercely denies that Max is in any way related to her. She tells him about how she was picked out of the audience one night and brought on stage to take part in the act, and was then pursued by Max, who sought a relationship. She insists that she has had to physically fend off his romantic advances.

Jo Ann and Charlene both have feelings for Joe but leave him mystified, particularly when both appear to have received exactly the same brooch from Max as a gift. Jo Ann naively believes that hers is a rare antique that once belonged to Montezuma's daughter. The more worldly-wise Charlene suggests she believed Max's line at first too, but she now has a whole display card of them marked at a price of 85 cents each. He is not sure whom to trust.

One day, Max arrives at Joe's shabby boarding house room and demands that Joe leave Jo Ann alone. During the ensuing argument Joe pushes Max halfway out the window but cannot bring himself to kill his rival. Max observes that it is not so easy to kill a man, and shows Joe the pistol he brought with the intention of shooting him.

Max, who has always been pretentiously snobbish, begins to taunt Joe. He tells him that he thinks Joe is beneath him, and then begins to insinuate that he and Jo Ann had a sexual relationship. Joe becomes enraged and shoots Max.

Police are about to smoke him out with tear gas when Jo Ann arrives. She manages to talk Joe into giving himself up, promising to wait for him if he is sent away to prison. Joe had considered himself friendless, but most of the assembled crowd, including Charlene, Joe's coworker and neighbor Bill Pulanski, and Frank Dunlap, a blind man who lives in the neighborhood, support him.

== Cast ==
- Henry Fonda as Joe Adams
- Barbara Bel Geddes as Jo Ann
- Vincent Price as Maximilian
- Ann Dvorak as Charlene
- Howard Freeman as Sheriff Ned Meade
- Moroni Olsen as Chief of Police
- Elisha Cook Jr. as Frank Dunlap
- Queenie Smith as Mrs. Tully
- David Clarke as Bill Pulanski
- Charles McGraw as Policeman Stevens
- Patty King as Peggy

== Production ==
When RKO acquired the distribution rights to Le jour se lève in preparation for remaking it as The Long Night, they also sought to buy up all available prints of the original film and destroy them. For a time, it was thought that the French film had been lost completely, but copies of it re-appeared in the 1950s and its classic status was re-established.

The score for the film makes extensive use of the famous Allegretto second movement of Beethoven's Seventh Symphony.

== Reception ==
=== Box office ===
According to Variety, the film earned less than $1 million at the box office.

The film recorded a loss of $1 million.

=== Critical response ===
A Life magazine review at the time blamed "Hollywood commercialism and the stultifying institution of censorship" for the film's poor quality, noting that, "because anything having to do with incest is banned from U.S. films by censors and because Hollywood considers sad endings unprofitable, a moving and mature tragedy has been remade into melodramatic goulash."
