= Wing and a Prayer, The Story of Carrier X =

1944 film by Henry Hathaway

- 1944 theatrical poster
- Directed by: Henry Hathaway
- Written by: Jerome Cady
- Produced by: Walter Morosco; William Bacher
- Starring: Don Ameche; Dana Andrews; William Eythe
- Cinematography: Glen MacWilliams
- Edited by: J. Watson Webb Jr.
- Music by: Hugo Friedhofer
- Production company: Twentieth Century-Fox Film Corp.
- Distributed by: 20th Century Fox
- Release date: July 24, 1944
- Running time: 97 min
- Country: United States
- Language: English
- Box office: $2,250,000

Wing and a Prayer, The Story of Carrier X (also known as Queen of the Flat Tops and Torpedo Squadron Eight) is a black-and-white 1944 war film about the crew of an American aircraft carrier in the desperate early days of World War II in the Pacific theater, directed by Henry Hathaway and starring Don Ameche, Dana Andrews and William Eythe. It was nominated for the 1944 Academy Award for Best Original Screenplay.

The film title Wing and a Prayer was borrowed from a number one hit song in 1943, "Comin' In on a Wing and a Prayer". In a bit of studio self-promotion, the carrier crew watches another 20th Century Fox picture, Tin Pan Alley (1940), during the film.

== Plot ==
In the days just after the attack on Pearl Harbor, the American people are asking "Where is our navy? Why doesn't it fight?" Gravely weakened by the disaster, the US Navy comes up with a plan to trap the Japanese by using one carrier to imitate a fleet in order to deceive the Japanese Navy into heading for Midway, where they will be attacked. Meanwhile, on the carrier charged with the mission ("Carrier X"), flight commander Bingo Harper is in charge of the bomber crews that shouldered the burden in the desperate early days of the war. He is tough and sticks to the rules, while his young pilots behave more like youngsters and do not always understand his thinking.

A new squadron led by Lieutenant Commander Edward Moulton is assigned to the carrier. From the first landing, Harper notices a careless and inexperienced attitude by ex-Hollywood Academy Award–winning star, Ensign Hallam "Oscar" Scott. Harper warns Moulton that the squadron's safety cannot be jeopardized and any repeat of the sloppiness will not be tolerated. Moulton does his best with his men, but is far from having absolute control. During a bombing run, Ensign Breinard drops a bomb close to the carrier and Harper grounds him. After winning the Navy Cross for actions at Coral Sea, Ensign Cunningham fails to follow the correct takeoff procedure and ditches his aircraft into the sea: Harper forbids him to fly again. Later, Cunningham saves the ship in a suicide attack on a torpedo from a Japanese aircraft.

In the meantime, a message is received from Navy headquarters. The carrier is ordered to travel deep into enemy waters, near the Solomon Islands, and make its presence known in order to deceive the Japanese about American fleet dispositions and intentions. However, they are under strict orders not to fight. When Moulton's bombers encounter some Japanese aircraft, they follow orders and retreat, but two aircraft are lost. Not knowing the plan, the pilots are furious. This is repeated several times in other widely separated locations, driving the aviators to the brink of rebellion. The carrier, however, accomplishes its mission as the Japanese believe that the sightings are of different American carriers, not just one.

Finally, the long-prepared trap is sprung. Deceived into believing that the American carriers are scattered across the Pacific, the Japanese are taken by surprise when the concentrated American fleet attacks their carriers. Many pilots are lost, but the Americans win a great victory. However, the last bomber, flown by Scott and very low on fuel, has trouble finding their carrier, which is concealed below low clouds. Moulton begs Harper to break radio silence or turn on the searchlights to guide him in, but Harper refuses to risk betraying the carrier's location to any Japanese submarines that may be lurking nearby. Eventually, Scott's aircraft is heard crashing into the water when it runs out of fuel. Moulton and Harper quarrel, but in a few minutes, it is reported that Scott has been picked up by a destroyer. Harper gives his men an explanation of his reasoning when giving orders which may mean sacrificing a few for the success of the mission.

== Cast ==
- Don Ameche as Commander Bingo Harper
- Dana Andrews as Lieutenant Commander Edward Moulton
- William Eythe as Ensign Hallam "Oscar" Scott
- Charles Bickford as Captain Waddell
- Cedric Hardwicke as the Admiral
- Kevin O'Shea as Ensign Charles "Cookie" Cunningham
- Richard Jaeckel as Beezy Bessemer
- Harry Morgan (credited as Henry Morgan) as Ensign Malcolm Brainard
- Richard Crane as Ensign Gus Chisholm
- Glenn Langan as the Executive Officer
- Renny McEvoy as Ensign Cliff Hale
- Robert Bailey as Ensign Paducah Holloway
- Reed Hadley as Commander O'Donnell
- John Kellogg as a Duty Officer
- George Mathews as Dooley
- B.S. Pully as Flat Top
- John C. Young as Jeep driver
- Ray Walker as Sailor assisting projectionist
- Dave Willock as Ensign Hans Jacobson

== Historical accuracy ==
Wing and a Prayer ... loosely portrays actual historic events related mainly with USS Yorktown (CV-5) shortly after the attack on Pearl Harbor, through the Battle of the Coral Sea and up to the Battle of Midway. The scenario is, however, intentionally changed to justify the initial defensive rather than offensive posture of a US Navy reeling from the early Japanese victories in 1942. The Battle of the Coral Sea is justified as a calculated plot to deceive the Japanese into believing that the U.S. fleet was scattered and vulnerable, while the Battle of Midway is depicted as the eventual springing of this carefully laid trap which thereby caught the enemy at a disadvantage. (Note: In reality, the losses at Pearl Harbor and the numerical superiority of the Japanese had the Americans operating constantly on the defensive in the early period of the Pacific war. It was mainly superior military intelligence, specifically the breaking of the Japanese code, that made possible the crushing American victory at Midway.)

== Production ==
Wing and a Prayer was based on Stanley Johnston’s Queen of the Flat Tops (1942), a book that 20th Century Fox tried to buy but the rights were not obtained. After a legal tangle, the studio dropped its plans to buy rights but Johnson sued and won a settlement in 1946.

Although some scenes were shot in studio back lots, and water tank, the carrier is the USS Yorktown, a typical Essex class, with filming by 20th Century Fox permitted by the US Navy during her shakedown cruise in 1943. The US Navy exacted control over the Wing and a Prayer to the extent that the film was a "semi-official" production.

The aircraft used in the Wing and a Prayer, The Story of Carrier X were mainly Grumman TBF Avenger torpedo bombers, Grumman F6F Hellcat fighters and Curtiss SB2C Helldiver dive bombers. These were contemporary with US Navy carrier aircraft designs during 1943 and 1944 rather than 1942 when the film is set. In a few scenes, Grumman F4F Wildcat fighters and Douglas SBD Dauntless dive bombers appear which would have been accurate for 1942.

Grumman F4F Wildcat fighters play the part of Japanese "Zero" fighters in the film. A Curtiss-Wright CW-22 also makes a very brief appearance as a Japanese reconnaissance aircraft. The action on the carrier deck is convincing as well as the character of the pilots. Real footage is mixed with action shot on the carrier. For some scenes, scale models were also used.

== Reception ==
Film critic Thomas M. Pryor reviewed Wing and a Prayer, The Story of Carrier X for The New York Times. He commented: "at once a sobering reminder of the perilous conditions under which the American Navy sailed the vast Pacific in the months immediately following Pearl Harbor and a first-rate piece of movie-making to boot."
