= Peter Miles (American actor) =

American actor & writer (1938–2002)

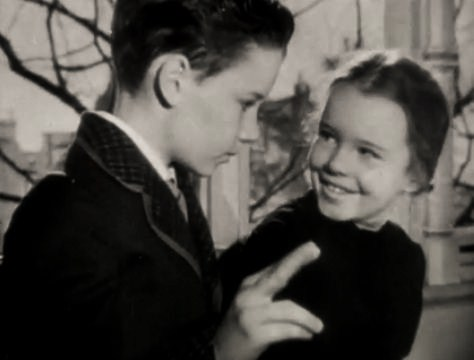
- Peter Miles and his sister Gigi Perreau in Enchantment (1948)
- Born: Gerald Richard Perreau-Saussine; April 1, 1938; Tokyo, Japan
- Died: August 3, 2002 (aged 64); Los Angeles, California, U.S.

Peter Miles (April 1, 1938 – August 3, 2002) was the stage name of American child actor Gerald Richard Perreau-Saussine. He was also billed as Gerald Perreau. After his film career ended, he turned to writing under the pen name Richard Miles.

== Early life ==
Born in Tokyo, Miles was the son of Eleanor Alfrida (Child) and Robert Henri Perreau-Saussine, and the older brother of actresses Gigi, Janine, and Lauren Perreau. He was educated at Beverly Hills Catholic School and graduated from Loyola High School in Los Angeles, California.

== Acting career ==
His first screen appearance was as the uncredited son of Humphrey Bogart's character in Passage to Marseille (1944). Other notable film credits include Enchantment (1948), The Red Pony (1949), and Quo Vadis (1951).

Miles then began appearing on television, guest starring in episodes of Father Knows Best, The Lone Ranger, and 77 Sunset Strip, among others, and he was a regular on The Betty Hutton Show with his sister, Gigi Perreau, for a year. In 1959, he guest-starred (under the name "Richard Miles") on Perry Mason as defendant Jimmy Morrow in "The Case of the Spanish Cross" and in 1962 on Straightaway as Vernon in the episode "The Drag Strip."

== Post-acting career ==
As Richard Miles, he wrote novels, poetry, and two screenplays. In 1963, he entered his first novel, That Cold Day in the Park, in a Dell Publishing contest; it did not win, but was considered worthy of publication in 1965; it was made into a film of the same name in 1969. Samuel Goldwyn and his wife personally presented him with the Samuel Goldwyn Writing Award for his novel Angel Loves Nobody, while he was attending UCLA. His third novel was The Moonbathers.

He was also a schoolteacher and president of the Burbank Teachers Association.

In the art world, he compiled catalogs of works of various artists and curated shows from the 1980s to 2001.

== Death ==
Miles died of cancer in Los Angeles. He was survived by his mother, sisters Gigi, Janine and Lauren, and his partner Brian Quarch.

== Complete filmography ==
=== As actor ===
- Passage to Marseille (1944) as Jean Matrac Jr. (uncredited)
- San Diego, I Love You (1944) as Joel McCooley(credited as Gerald Perreau)
- Hi, Beautiful (1944) as boy (uncredited)
- The Clock (1945) as boy in station (uncredited)
- Abbott and Costello in Hollywood (1945) as little boy with horn (uncredited)
- This Love of Ours (1945) as child (uncredited)
- Yolanda and the Thief (1945) as little boy (uncredited)
- Possessed (1947) as Wynn Graham (credited as Gerald Perreau)
- Curley (1947) as Dudley ("Dud") (credited as Gerald Perreau)
- Heaven Only Knows (1947) as Speck O'Donnell
- Who Killed Doc Robbin (1948) as Dudley (credited as Gerald Perreau)
- Family Honeymoon (1948) as Abner
- Enchantment (1948) as Rollo as a child
- The Red Pony (1949) as Tom
- Special Agent (1949) as Jake Rumpler Jr
- Roseanna McCoy (1949) as Little Randall McCoy
- Song of Surrender (1949) as Simon Beecham
- The Good Humor Man (1950) as Johnny Bellew
- Trigger, Jr. (1950) as Larry Harkrider
- California Passage (1950) as Tommy Martin
- Quo Vadis (1951) as Nazarius
- At Sword's Point (1952) as Young Louis XIV

=== As screenwriter ===
- The Madmen of Mandoras (1963)
- They Saved Hitler's Brain (1968 TV movie, The Madmen of Mandoras with about 20 minutes of new footage)
