= A Royal Scandal (1945 film) =

1945 film by Otto Preminger & Ernst Lubitsch

- Theatrical release poster
- Directed by: Otto Preminger
- Screenplay by: Edwin Justus Mayer; Bruno Frank (adaptation)
- Based on: Die Zarin by Lajos Bíró; Melchior Lengyel
- Produced by: Ernst Lubitsch
- Starring: Tallulah Bankhead; Charles Coburn; Anne Baxter; William Eythe
- Cinematography: Arthur Miller
- Edited by: Dorothy Spencer
- Music by: Alfred Newman
- Production company: 20th Century-Fox
- Distributed by: 20th Century-Fox
- Release date: April 11, 1945
- Running time: 94 minutes
- Country: United States
- Language: English
- Budget: $1,755,000
- Box office: $1,500,000

A Royal Scandal, also known as Czarina, is a 1945 American comedy-drama film directed by Otto Preminger, produced by Ernst Lubitsch, about the lovelife of Russian empress Catherine the Great. It stars Tallulah Bankhead, Charles Coburn, Anne Baxter and William Eythe. The film was based on the play Die Zarin (The Czarina) by Lajos Bíró and Melchior Lengyel.

== Plot ==
The palace of the demanding and iron-fisted Russian czarina Catherine the Great is full of intrigue. Devoted chancellor Nicolai Ilyitch conducts delicate negotiations for a treaty with France while surreptitiously stealing from the imperial treasuries. General Michael Ronsky schemes to overthrow Catherine in a military coup and install his oafish nephew Boris as a figurehead. Countess Anna Jaschikoff is the czarina's confidante and lady-in-waiting, helping her navigate the social aspects of court life. When Catherine discards her latest lover, Variatinsky, commander of the palace guard, he responds by attempting to shoot himself, but he misses. Determined to conclude the Russian-French treaty by receiving the Marquis de Fleury, the French ambassador, Chancellor Nicolai orders that no only he and the ambassador may spend any time with the czarina. However, determined young lieutenant Alexei Chernoff, coincidentally Jaschikoff's fiancé, insists on an audience with Catherine, riding for three days and storming past palace security to speak to her.

Chernoff comes bearing news of Ronsky's nascent rebellion. It comes as no surprise to the czarina or to Chancellor Nicolai, who has already made an "arrangement" with Ronsky, but Catherine likes the patriotic and handsome lieutenant, promoting him to captain and asking him to prepare policy recommendations on foreign and domestic issues. Later, she seduces him, ensuring his promotion to general and installing him as the new commander of the palace guard. Countess Jaschikoff is infuriated and takes her anger out on Catherine, who responds by banishing her from court. Chancellor Nicolai, who has become outraged at Chernoff's reformist proposals, attempts to resign, but is compelled to stay on by Catherine, who ensures him that she is not taking Chernoff seriously as an advisor.

Elsewhere, Chernoff is being courted by Ronsky and the rebellious generals; they wish to use his position to ensure that the palace guard does not put up any resistance to their forces. To drive a wedge between Chernoff and Catherine, Ronsky introduces Chernoff to Variatinsky, who informs Chernoff in private of his intimate knowledge of Catherine. Chernoff attacks Variatinsky and begs Catherine to say that Variatinsky was lying, but the czarina candidly confirms his claims, describes Chernoff as a "nobody" whom she "made" prominent, and accidentally discloses that she has been discarding Chernoff's policy plans without reading them. Chernoff returns to Ronsky and pledges his support. Later that night, he dismisses the palace guard and arrests the czarina. Troops storm the palace, but they are loyal to Catherine; Chancellor Nicolai has leveraged his illicit control of Russia's finances for the allegiance of the rebels and then immediately betrayed them. The uprising is quelled.

Ronsky is made Chancellor Nicolai's servant, but a betrayed Catherine sentences Chernoff to death, a condemnation that he accepts as a traitor. Lobbying by Chancellor Nicolai and Countess Jaschikoff (who has returned from exile) convinces the czarina to pardon Chernoff. Finally, Catherine and the French ambassador conduct their long-delayed meeting. The diplomat, himself a young and handsome nobleman, greets Catherine with such obsequious flattery that the Czarina takes a romantic interest in him, and the film ends with Chancellor Nicolai leaving the two to flirt in privacy, confident that a relationship between the two will lead to the alliance for which he has long schemed.

== Cast ==
- Tallulah Bankhead as Catherine the Great
- Charles Coburn as Chancellor Nicolai Ilyitch
- Anne Baxter as Countess Anna Jaschikoff
- William Eythe as Lieutenant/Captain/Major/Colonel/General/Private Alexei Chernoff
- Vincent Price as Marquis de Fleury, Ambassador-Plenipotentiary of France, Vicomte de Bayeux, Comte de Bayon Valez, Baron de Villau, and Keeper of the Seals
- Mischa Auer as Captain Sukov
- Sig Ruman as General Michael Nicolai Vladimirovich Ronsky
- Vladimir Sokoloff as Malakoff
- Mikhail Rasumny as Drunken General
- Donald Douglas as Variatinsky
- Grady Sutton as Boris Nikitin
- Michael Visaroff as Russian General (uncredited)

== Production ==
Ernst Lubitsch, who directed the silent film Forbidden Paradise upon which A Royal Scandal is based, was the first director hired, but when he fell ill, he was replaced by Otto Preminger. However, Lubitsch directed the rehearsals, and he worked with Edwin Justus Mayer in the scripting process.

== Reception ==
In a contemporary review for The New York Times, critic Bosley Crowther called the film "an oddly dull and generally witless show" and wrote:

"The fault is quite obviously in the writing. Several authors have done little more than hack out a script with obvious action and lustreless dialogue. Where satire in large and splendid movement would seem the most promising attack, they have hewed to a style of cautious hinting, with only vague glints of wit and travesty. And Otto Preminger, in his direction, has not been able to help matters much. Miss Bankhead makes valiant efforts to fan the comic spirit in such spots as the script brings her into contact with malleable material—like a man. And, once or twice, when she moves in on her target, it looks as though something will explode. But inevitably the script stands before her, upright and impermeable. It must have been hard for Miss Bankhead to make Catherine as mild as she does. ... Ernst Lubitsch, who produced the film, should blush."
