= Her First Romance (1951 film) =

1951 film

- Directed by: Seymour Friedman
- Written by: Albert Mannheimer; Herman Wouk
- Starring: Margaret O'Brien; Jimmy Hunt; Ann Doran
- Cinematography: Charles Lawton, Jr.
- Edited by: Jerome Thoms
- Music by: George Duning
- Production company: Columbia Pictures
- Distributed by: Columbia Pictures
- Release date: May 4, 1951
- Running time: 72 minutes
- Country: United States
- Language: English

Her First Romance is a 1951 American drama romance film directed by Seymour Friedman and starring Margaret O'Brien, Allen Martin, Jr., Jimmy Hunt and Ann Doran.

The film's sets were designed by the art director Ross Bellah.

== Plot ==
High-school student Betty Foster is smitten with fellow teen Bobby Evans, but when her efforts to impress him at his birthday party and in the classroom fail miserably, she follows him to summer camp, dragging her brother Herbie along. While competing with pretty Lucille Stewart for Bobby's affections, Betty's emotions get the better of her, and trouble ensues.

== Cast ==
- Margaret O'Brien as Betty Foster
- Allen Martin, Jr., as Bobby Evans
- Jimmy Hunt as Herbie Foster
- Sharyn Moffett as Leona Dean
- Ann Doran as Mrs. Foster
- Lloyd Corrigan as Mr. Gauss, School Principal
- Elinor Donahue as Lucille Stewart
- Susan Stevens as Clara
- Marissa O'Brien as Tillie
- Arthur Space as Joseph "Joe" Foster
- Otto Hulett as Valentine Evans - Attorney at Law
- Lois Pace as Violet
- Harlan Warde as Paul Powers
- Maudie Prickett as Miss Pond - Schoolteacher

== Bibliography ==
- Goble, Alan. The Complete Index to Literary Sources in Film. Walter de Gruyter, 1999.
