= Gigi Perreau =

American actress (born 1941)

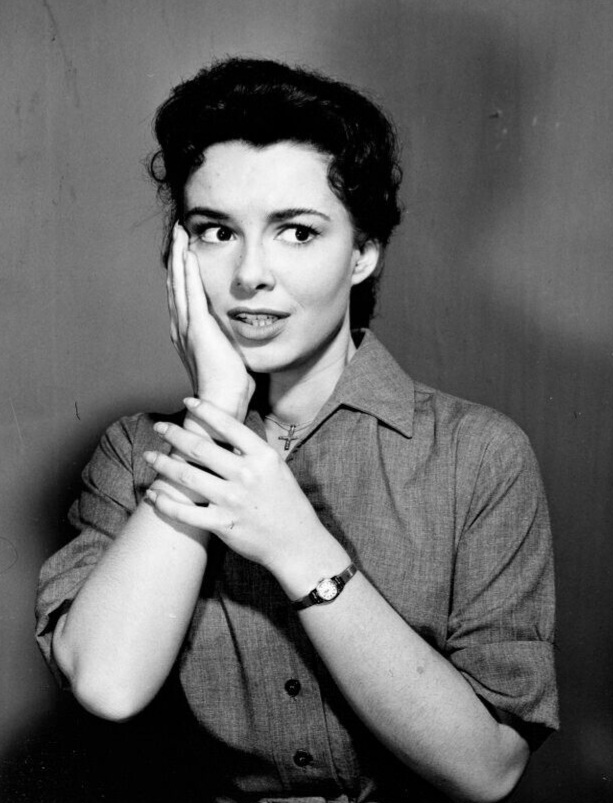
- Perreau in The Detectives, 1960
- Born: Ghislaine Elizabeth Marie Perreau-Saussine; 1941 (age 84–85)
- Education: Immaculate Heart High School
- Occupations: Actress, stage director, drama teacher
- Years active: 1943–present
- Known for: Shadow on the Wall; The Betty Hutton Show; The Man in the Gray Flannel Suit; Follow the Sun
- Spouse(s): Emil Frank Gallo (1960-1967); Gene Harve DeRuelle (1970-2000)
- Children: 4
- Awards: Hollywood Walk of Fame

Ghislaine Elizabeth Marie Thérèse Perreau-Saussine (born 1941), known professionally as Gigi Perreau, is an American film and television actress.

== Family ==
Ghislaine Elizabeth Marie Thérèse Perreau-Saussine was born in 1941. Her elder brother Gerald (stage name Peter Miles) and, to a lesser extent, her younger sisters Janine and Lauren, also had a measure of success in film and on television. Gigi and Gerald appeared together in the 1948 film Enchantment. She and Janine portrayed sisters in 1951's Week-End with Father.

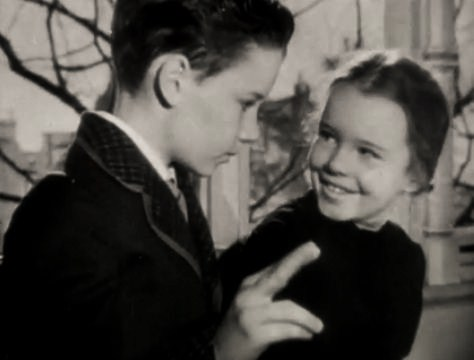
Gerald and Gigi Perreau in a trailer for Enchantment.

== Career ==
Perreau achieved success as a child actress in a number of films. She got into the business quite by accident. Her older brother Gerald was trying out for the part of the title character's son in Madame Curie (1943). Because their mother could not find a babysitter, she took Gigi along. The two-year-old, who could speak French, got the (uncredited) part of Madame Curie's daughter Ève (while Gerald would have to wait a year to make his film debut in Passage to Marseille).

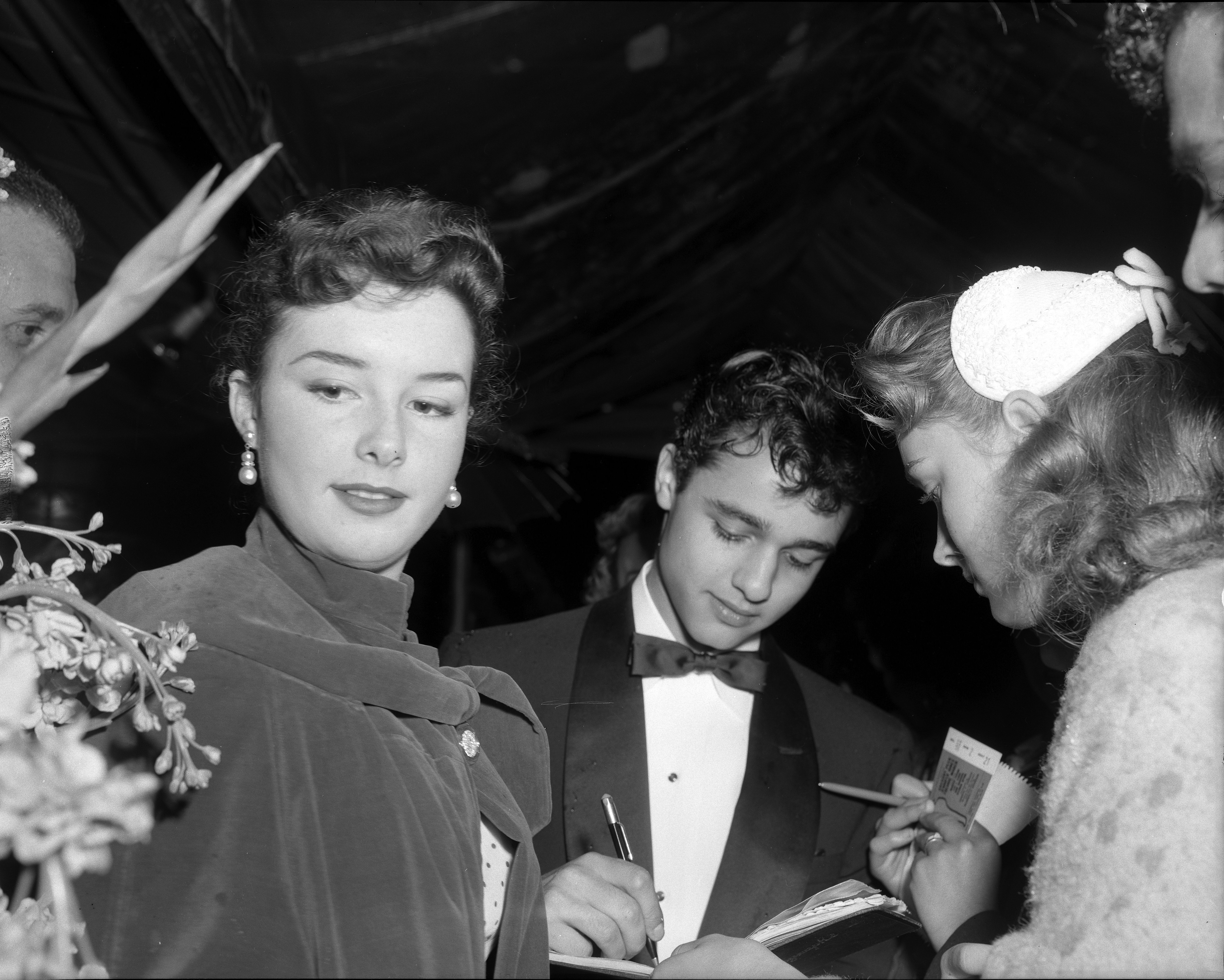
Perreau with Sal Mineo signing autographs at the 1956 premiere of The Man in the Gray Flannel Suit

She also played the daughter of Claude Rains and Bette Davis's characters in the 1944 film Mr. Skeffington (1944). In Shadow on the Wall (1950), she starred as the sole witness to a murder. As the "top child movie actress for 1951", the then ten-year-old was given the keys to the city of Pittsburgh by its mayor, and later Pennsylvania governor, David L. Lawrence. She was the youngest person to be so honored.

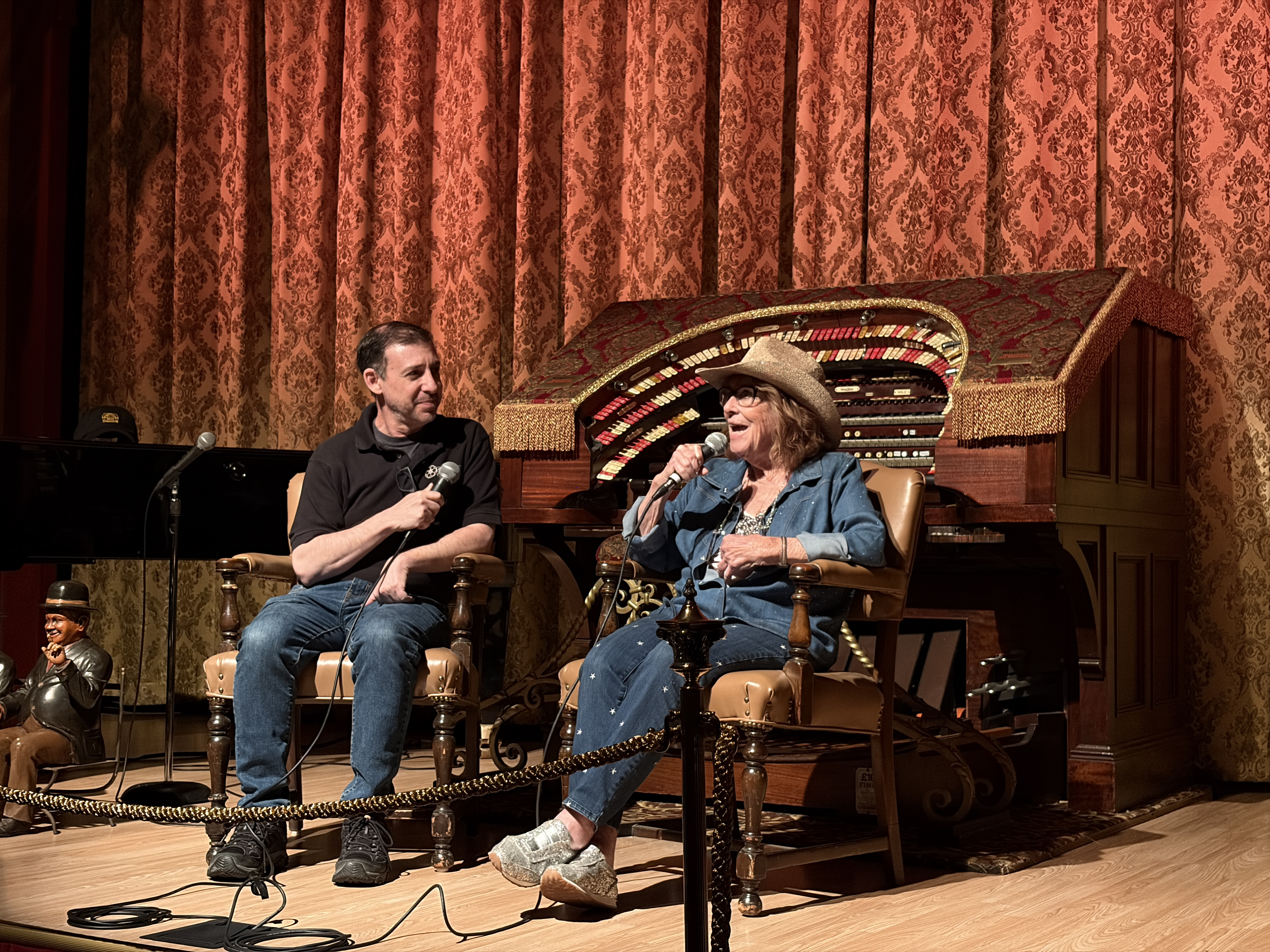
Perreau in 2026

Her top-child-star status was recognized in a November 11, 1951, ceremony in Hollywood. Phillip McClay, president of the Screen Children's Guild, presented Perreau with a miniature golden skillet, representing the first Small Fry Award.

Perreau played the rebellious teen daughter of Fredric March in 1956's The Man in the Gray Flannel Suit. However, her film career lost momentum as she became an adult, so she turned to television. In 1959, she played a friend of character Mary Stone (Shelley Fabares) on ABC's The Donna Reed Show, and had a supporting role in the sitcom The Betty Hutton Show on CBS, with her brother Gerald. In 1960, Perreau and Robert Harland performed as Sara Lou and Lin Proctor, a young couple from the east who have eloped and are heading west, in the ABC western series Stagecoach West episode "The Land Beyond", with Wayne Rogers and Robert Bray. Also in 1960, Perreau was cast as Julie Staunton in the episode "Flight from Terror" of the ABC adventure series The Islanders, set in the South Pacific. She was cast in two episodes, "Don Gringo" (1960) and "The Promise" (1961), of the Nick Adams ABC western series The Rebel. In 1961, she played Mary Bettelheim in the episode "The Twelfth Hour" of the ABC/Warner Brothers television crime drama The Roaring 20s. She was cast in a recurring role on ABC's Follow the Sun series from 1961 to 1962 as a secretary, Katherine Ann "Kathy" Richards. She guest-starred on The Rifleman in 1960 and 1961. She made two guest appearances on Perry Mason: in 1958 as title character and defendant Doris Bannister in "The Case of the Desperate Daughter" and in 1964 as nurse Phyllis Clover in "The Case of the Sleepy Slayer." In 1964, she also co-starred as Lucy, a beleaguered homesteader, on an episode of Gunsmoke titled "Chicken". In 1970, she appeared on the sitcom The Brady Bunch in the episode "The Undergraduate", portraying a math teacher who becomes the object of puppy love by Greg Brady, one of her students. On December 17, 1974, she appeared as Iris Cooley on Adam-12.

In the 2000s, she provided her voice in the animated films Fly Me to the Moon (2008), A Turtle's Tale: Sammy's Adventures (2010) and Crash: The Animated Movie (2017), and acted in Time Again (2011).

== Personal life ==
Perreau, 19, married 35-year-old business executive Emil Frank Gallo on October 1, 1960, in Hollywood; it was the first marriage for both parties. Perreau had two daughters and two sons.

== Affiliations ==
As of 2010, Perreau was a member of the board of directors of both the Donna Reed Foundation for the Performing Arts and the Will Geer Theatricum Botanicum and is the vice-president of the Drama Teachers Association of Southern California. She was a drama teacher for Meghan Markle. She was a guest of ITN at the wedding of Prince Harry and Meghan Markle in 2018.

== Honors ==
On February 8, 1960, Perreau was awarded a star on the Hollywood Walk of Fame for her work in television.

On March 14, 1998, she was honored by the Young Artist Foundation with its Former Child Star "Lifetime Achievement" Award in recognition of her outstanding achievements within the entertainment industry as a child actress.

== Filmography ==
Year	Title	Role	Note
1943	Madame Curie	Ève Curie	Uncredited
1944	Two Girls and a Sailor	Jean as a child	Uncredited
1944	Mr. Skeffington	Fanny at age 2	As Ghislaine Perreau
1944	The Seventh Cross	Annie Roeder	Uncredited
1944	The Master Race	Baby	As Ghislaine Perreau
1944	Dark Waters	Girl	Uncredited
1945	God Is My Co-Pilot	Robin Lee Scott	Uncredited
1945	Voice of the Whistler	Bobbie	
1945	Yolanda and the Thief	Gigi	As Ghislaine Perreau
1946	To Each His Own	Virgie Ingham	Uncredited
1946	High Barbaree	Young Nancy	Uncredited
1946	Alias Mr. Twilight	Susan	As Gi-Gi Perreau
1947	Song of Love	Julie	
1947	Green Dolphin Street	Veronica	
1948	The Sainted Sisters	Beasley girl	Uncredited
1948	Enchantment	Lark as a Child	
1949	Family Honeymoon	Zoe	
1949	Roseanna McCoy	Allifair McCoy	
1949	Song of Surrender	Faith Beecham	
1949	My Foolish Heart	Ramona	
1950	Shadow on the Wall	Susan Starrling	
1950	Never a Dull Moment	Tina	
1950	For Heaven's Sake	Item	
1951	The Lady Pays Off	Diane Braddock	
1951	Reunion in Reno	Margaret 'Maggie' Angeline Linaker	
1951	Week-End with Father	Anne Stubbs	
1952	Has Anybody Seen My Gal	Roberta Blaisdell	
1952	Bonzo Goes to College	Betsy	
1955	There's Always Tomorrow	Ellen	
1956	The Man in the Gray Flannel Suit	Susan Hopkins	
1956	Dance with Me, Henry	Shelley	
1958	The Cool and the Crazy	Amy	
1958	Wild Heritage	'Missouri' Breslin	
1959	Girls Town	Serafina	
1961	Look in Any Window	Eileen Lowell	
1961	Tammy Tell Me True	Rita	
1967	Hell on Wheels	Sue	
1967	Journey to the Center of Time	Karen White	
1977	High Seas Hijack	Patricia Haber	English version
2008	Fly Me to the Moon	Amelia	Voice, uncredited
2010	A Turtle's Tale: Sammy's Adventures	Whale	Voice
2011	Time Again	Old Lady	
2017	Crash: The Animated Movie	Grandma Swift	Voice

== Television credits ==
Year	Series	Episode	Role	Notes
1958	Perry Mason	"The Case of the Desperate Daughter"	Doris Bannister	
1959	Alfred Hitchcock Presents	"Graduating Class"	Gloria Barnes	aired December 27
1960	Rawhide	"Incident at Poco Tiempo"	Sister Joan	
1960	The Rifleman	"Heller"	Daughter Heller	
1961	The Rifleman	"Deathtrap"	Daughter Vicky	
1965	My Three Sons	"Be My Guest"	Polly	
1966	Gomer Pyle - U.S.M.C.	"Arrivederci, Gomer"	Rosa Lombardi	Season 2, Episode 19
1970	The Brady Bunch	"The Undergraduate"	Linda O'Hara	

== Bibliography ==
- Goldrup, Tom and Jim (2002). Growing Up on the Set: Interviews with 39 Former Child Actors of Film and Television. McFarland & Co. p. 266-232. ISBN 1476613702.
- Best, Marc (1971). Those Endearing Young Charms: Child Performers of the Screen. South Brunswick and New York: Barnes & Co., pp. 209–214.
