= The Lady and the Mob =

- Theatrical release poster
- Directed by: Benjamin Stoloff
- Screenplay by: Richard Maibaum; Gertrude Purcell
- Story by: George Bradshaw; Price Day
- Based on: Old Mrs. Leonard and the Machine Guns by: George Bradshaw; Price Day
- Produced by: Fred Kohlmar
- Starring: Fay Bainter; Ida Lupino; Lee Bowman; Henry Armetta; Warren Hymer; Harold Huber
- Cinematography: John Stumar
- Edited by: Otto Meyer
- Music by: Charles Bradshaw; Leigh Harline
- Production company: Columbia Pictures
- Distributed by: Columbia Pictures
- Release date: April 3, 1939
- Running time: 66 minutes
- Country: United States
- Language: English

The Lady and the Mob is a 1939 American crime film directed by Benjamin Stoloff and written by Richard Maibaum and Gertrude Purcell. The film stars Fay Bainter, Ida Lupino, Lee Bowman, Henry Armetta, Warren Hymer and Harold Huber. It was released on April 3, 1939, by Columbia Pictures.

== Plot ==
Hattie Leonard, is a matron who runs both the local bank and the town. When racketeers move into town and Hattie's dry cleaning costs dramatically increase. Hattie asks the mayor act to rid the town of the racketeers. He refuses and she gets a gang led by an ex-thug she once helped. Hattie then sets out with her bulletproof limousine and machine guns, to clean up the town. Hattie hijacks George Watson's protection racket collectors and return the money to the merchants. Watson's men retaliate against the merchants. Hattie's son's fiancée lures Watson to the Hattie's house. Hattie learns that Mayor Jones is behind the rackets. Hattie demands the mayor's resignation, so he jails her thrown for kidnapping Watson. That night, Hattie's boys saw through the jail's bars. Sneaking out on later nights, Hattie funds the merchant's protection. On the night Hattie escapes, her boys rouse the district attorney and take him to the Hattie Leonard bank. There, Hattie opens the mayor's safety deposit box and finds the marked bills she had given to the merchants to pay the racketeers, implicating the mayor in the racketeering scheme.

== Cast ==
- Fay Bainter as Hattie Leonard
- Ida Lupino as Lila Thorne
- Lee Bowman as Fred Leonard
- Henry Armetta as Zambrogio
- Warren Hymer as Frankie O'Fallon
- Harold Huber as Harry the Lug
- Joe Sawyer as Blinky Mack
- Tom Dugan as Brains Logan
- Brandon Tynan as Mayor Jones
- George Meeker as George Watson
