= George Bradshaw (writer) =

American novelist

George Bradshaw (1907–1973) was an American writer and journalist.

== Life ==
George Floing Bradshaw was born in Pittsburgh, Pennsylvania on June 18, 1907. He was the only child of George Calvert Bradshaw (1880-1921) and Caroline Elizabeth Floing Bradshaw Cunningham (1876-1960). He graduated from Princeton University in 1930. During World War II, he was a major in the U.S. Army Air Forces. He died in New York on November 11, 1973, at age 66, erroneously reported as 64.

== Works ==
He wrote about 150 short stories, which were printed in Vogue, Ladies Home Journal, The Saturday Evening Post, and Cosmopolitan.

=== Books ===
- 1962: Practise to Deceive (13 stories)
- Five cookbooks:

- Bradshaw, George (1973). Soufflés, Quiches, Mousses & the Random Egg. André Deutsch. ISBN 978-0-233-96400-3.

=== Films ===
- 1937: New Faces of 1937. Based on the story "Shoestring"
- 1939: The Lady and the Mob. Story "Old Mrs. Leonard and the Machine Guns"
- 1939: Second Fiddle. Story "When Winter Comes"
- 1952: The Bad and the Beautiful. Story "Of Good and Evil" (longer version is called Memorial to a Bad Man). Charles Schnee received Academy Award for Best Adapted Screenplay
- 1953: Letter to Loretta (TV Series), episode "Love Story".
- 1958: Matinee Theatre (TV Series), episode "The Phony Venus".
- 1966: How to Steal a Million, based on a story "Venus Rising" in Practise to Deceive
