= Right Cross =

1950 film by John Sturges

- Theatrical release poster
- Directed by: John Sturges
- Written by: Charles Schnee
- Produced by: Armand Deutsch
- Starring: June Allyson; Ricardo Montalbán; Dick Powell
- Cinematography: Norbert Brodine
- Edited by: James E. Newcom
- Music by: David Raksin
- Distributed by: Metro-Goldwyn-Mayer
- Release date: November 15, 1950
- Running time: 90 minutes
- Country: United States
- Language: English
- Budget: $873,000
- Box office: $1.3 million

Right Cross is a 1950 American sports drama film released by Metro-Goldwyn-Mayer, directed by John Sturges, written by Charles Schnee and starring June Allyson, Ricardo Montalbán, Dick Powell and Lionel Barrymore. Marilyn Monroe appears in one of her earliest films in a small, uncredited role.

== Plot ==
Sean O'Malley, a wheelchair-using fight promoter once known as the best in his business, has lost his professional stature and is now in poor health. His daughter Pat has taken many of his responsibilities and is romantically involved with his best fighter and boxing stable's only meaningful asset, light heavyweight champion Johnny Monterez.

Sean is unhappy that Johnny is ashamed of his Mexican heritage. When Sean tells Pat that promoter Allan Goff is trying to steal Johnny from him, Pat visits Johnny at his training camp in time to watch spar, during which Johnny hurts his hand.

While Johnny's injury is being examined at the hospital, Pat tries to locate their mutual friend Rick Gavery, a hard-drinking sports reporter who is pals with Johnny but hopelessly in love with Pat. Pat finds Rick in jail, where he ends up after his ritual steam blowing-off one-night benders. When Johnny's doctor tells him that his hand has taken a beating over his 75 fight career and is now vulnerable to permanent injury, Johnny asks him to keep his prognosis a secret. After telling Pat and some reporters that his hand is merely bruised, Johnny returns to his training camp for two weeks of rest and recuperation. A short time later, he receives word that his trouble-prone cousin Luis is in jail again and needs bail money.

Believing that his injury may end his boxing career at any moment, Johnny agrees to covert is non-title bout to a title bout, in order to boost its lagging gate - which will considerably increase his share as well as Sean's. His real intention, though, is to jilt Sean and sign a lucrative contract with Goff, who has promised Johnny guaranteed income for boostering Goff's fights after his retirement.

Johnny takes Rick to visit his mother, but soon after they arrive, Johnny insists his younger sister Marina must stop dating her boyfriend Bob because he is a "gringo" whom Johnny has convinced himself is only interested in her because she is the sister of a famous fighter. When Rick accuses Johnny of harboring prejudice against Whites, Johnny sends him away with an insult.

Later, Pat, expecting a marriage proposal from Johnny, is disappointed when Johnny tells her that he has decided to sign with Goff. Sean dies a short time later, and Pat accuses Johnny of killing her father with his act of betrayal. Realizing that he has nearly lost Pat's love and Rick's friendship, Johnny opts to leave boxing forever by purposely losing a title match. Pat and Johnny reconcile and look forward to a happy future together.

== Cast ==
- June Allyson as Pat O'Malley
- Dick Powell as Rick Garvey
- Ricardo Montalbán as Johnny Monterez (credited as Ricardo Montalban)
- Lionel Barrymore as Sean O'Malley
- Teresa Celli as Marina Monterez
- Barry Kelley as Allan Goff
- Tom Powers as Tom Balford
- Mimi Aguglia as Mom Monterez
- Marianne Stewart as Audrey
- John Gallaudet as Phil Tripp
- Wally Maher as First Reporter
- Larry Keating as Second Reporter
- Kenneth Tobey as Ken, the Third Reporter
- Bert Davidson as Fourth Reporter
- Marilyn Monroe as Dusky Ledoux (uncredited)
- Robert Osterloh as Totem, Heldon's Manager (uncredited)
- John Maxwell as Walker (uncredited)

== Music ==
The film's dramatic score was composed by David Raksin and conducted by Raksin and Johnny Green. Raksin's score consists only of music for the main and end titles, and one short piece in the first reel.

Raksin's music was issued on CD in 2009 by Film Score Monthly.

== Reception ==
In a contemporary review for The New York Times, critic Thomas M. Pryor wrote:

Now it isn't often that you find a cinematic slugfest that gives off sparks of social conscience, but if "Right Cross" is the best that Metro can do in this regard, then let's hope that they don't attempt such pretentious embroidering of an elemental plot in the future. ... [W]e have no doubt about "Right Cross" being a lightweight entry in the pugilistic sweepstakes. This is a picture with a lot of talk, cloyingly cute romantics and only a few rounds of fast, rough ring action.

According to MGM records, the film cost $873,000 and earned $955,000 in the U.S. and Canada and $347,000 elsewhere, resulting in a $64,000 loss for the studio.

== See also ==
- List of boxing films
