= Wings of Chance =

1961 film by Eddie Dew

- Theatrical poster
- Directed by: Eddie Dew (credited as Edward Dew)
- Written by: Story: Mark Homer; Patrick Whyte Screenplay
- Based on: Kirby's Gander by John Patrick Gillese
- Produced by: Larry Matanski; Lorne H. Reed (Executive producer)
- Starring: James Brown; Frances Rafferty; Richard Tretter; Patrick Whyte
- Cinematography: Leonard Clairmont
- Edited by: Walter Hannemann; Monty Pearce
- Music by: Michael Andersen
- Production company: Tiger Film
- Distributed by: Universal-International
- Release dates: March 23, 1961 (Canada); May 15, 1961 (U.S.)
- Running time: 76 minutes
- Countries: United States; Canada
- Language: English
- Budget: $200,000
- Box office: $9,000,000

Wings of Chance is a 1961 American/Canadian action / drama film directed by Eddie Dew based on a story by John Patrick Gillese. The film stars James Brown, Frances Rafferty, Richard Tretter and Patrick Whyte. Wings of Chance is one of the first full-length feature films shot in Canada for a Hollywood production and was an effort to stimulate Canada's film industry. (Note: Captains of the Clouds (1941) was the first feature length Hollywood production filmed entirely in Canada.)

== Plot ==
Two Canadian bush pilots, Steve Kirby (James Brown) and Johnny Summers (Richard Tretter), are best friends and partners in a small flying business. They are also rivals for the affections of local girl Arlene Baker (Frances Rafferty). When Steve goes to the mountain lodge where Arlene works, a jealous Johnny flies there, and against air regulations, lands on a nearby lake, attracting the attention of the Royal Canadian Mounted Police.

While Johnny is held by the police, Steve flies back home, but an oil line breaks, forcing him to crash-land in remote bush country. Retrieving his survival gear, he sets up camp. With the few supplies on board, Steve manages to keep himself alive by hunting and fishing, but as winter is setting in, he realizes that rescuers are not coming. A desperate idea forms when he rescues a wild gander from a wolf. A bond develops between the gander and the pilot, allowing him to tag each of her newborn goslings with a metal strip bearing his name. When the young geese take to the sky, one of them is downed by a hunter who finds Steve's message and contacts the air force. Steve is found barely alive, but Arlene nurses him back to health.

== Cast ==
- James Brown as Steve "Red" Kirby
- Frances Rafferty as Arlene Baker
- Richard Tretter as Johnny Summers
- Patrick Whyte as Mike Farrel

John Patrick Gillese, the author of the book on which the film is based, makes a cameo appearance as one of the bush pilots searching for the downed aircraft.

== Production ==
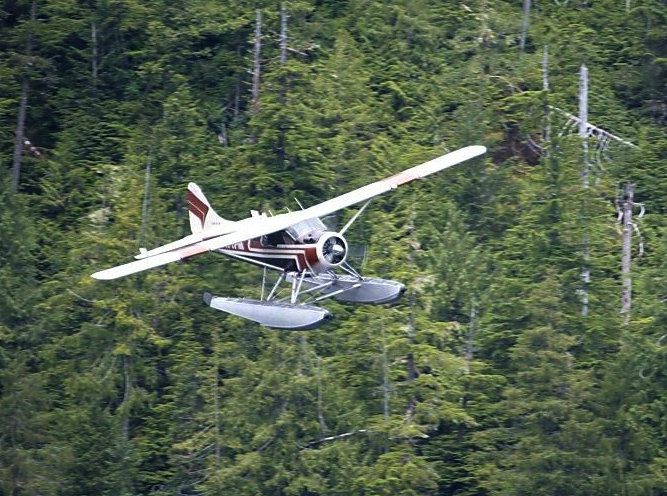
A de Havilland Canada DHC-2 Beaver bush plane was prominently featured in Wings of Chance.

Canadian producer Larry Matanski had been aware of the scenic beauty of Alberta's national parks as the setting for River of No Return (1954), starring Robert Mitchum and Marilyn Monroe. In adapting the 1957 short story "Kirby's Gander" by John Patrick Gillese (later renamed "Wings of Chance") that was set in the Alberta bush, he thought he would be able to attract interest from a Hollywood production company. (Note: John Patrick Gillese was a prolific author, with over 5,000 articles, novels and other literary work published.) Re-written as Wings of Chance, the production was extremely "low-budget", shot for $200,000 with one camera and a small production crew. Despite the meagre production values, the scenery of Alberta's national parks was the real selling point to Universal Pictures, which signed on as the film distributor.

Another selling point was prolific actor James E. Brown, who played the lead. Brown, best known as Lieutenant Ripley "Rip" Masters in all 166 episodes of the 1954-1959 ABC Western television series The Adventures of Rin Tin Tin, had a four-decade career that included feature films and television work.

== Reception ==
Wings of Chance was first premiered in Los Angeles, and with its modest budget, was able to return a large profit of $9,000,000. Reviews noted that the wilderness saga of a heroic figure such as a bush pilot was appealing. Later analysis by film reviewer Dr. Evelyn Ellerman was less kind: "'Wings of Chance' features touristic aerial views of the Canadian Rockies, it is nothing more than a feel-good animal story for a family audience. The plot is completely transparent, the dialogue is weak and the characterization negligible."

Mataski's vision of creating a provincial film industry in Alberta continued with a follow-up, The Naked Flame (later re-titled Deadline for Murder) (1964), which did not do well at the box office. With the subsequent financial loss from this project, his film career came to an end.

== See also ==
- List of American films of 1961
