= Two Weeks in Another Town =

1962 drama film directed by Vincente Minnelli

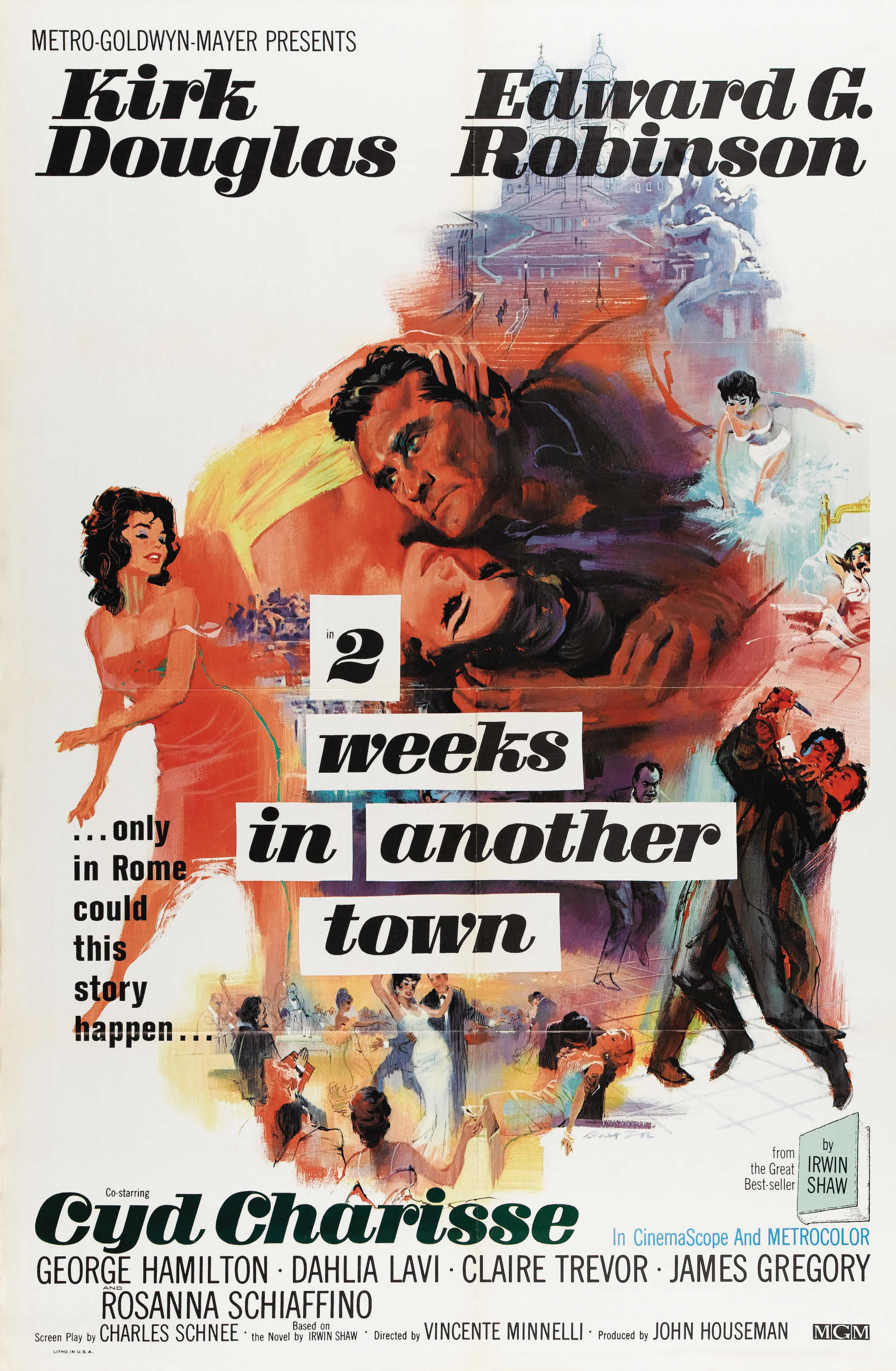
- Theatrical release poster
- Directed by: Vincente Minnelli
- Screenplay by: Charles Schnee
- Based on: Two Weeks in Another Town; 1960 novel by Irwin Shaw
- Produced by: John Houseman
- Starring: Kirk Douglas; Edward G. Robinson; Cyd Charisse; George Hamilton; Claire Trevor; Daliah Lavi; Rosanna Schiaffino
- Cinematography: Milton Krasner
- Edited by: Adrienne Fazan; Robert James Kern
- Music by: David Raksin
- Production companies: Metro-Goldwyn-Mayer; John Houseman Productions
- Distributed by: Metro-Goldwyn-Mayer
- Release date: August 17, 1962 (United States)
- Running time: 107 minutes
- Country: United States
- Language: English
- Budget: $3,959,000
- Box office: $2,500,000

Two Weeks in Another Town is a 1962 American drama film directed by Vincente Minnelli and starring Kirk Douglas and Edward G. Robinson. The supporting players include Cyd Charisse, Claire Trevor, Daliah Lavi, George Hamilton, and Rosanna Schiaffino. The film was based on a 1960 novel by Irwin Shaw and depicts the shooting of a romantic costume drama in Rome by a team of decadent Hollywood stars during the Hollywood on the Tiber era. The picture contains several references to The Bad and the Beautiful, a previous successful MGM movie directed by Minnelli and produced by John Houseman a decade earlier, also with a screenplay by Charles Schnee, music by David Raksin, and starring Kirk Douglas as the lead character.

The story was seen by some as a depiction of the relationships among Tyrone Power, Linda Christian and Darryl Zanuck. At the time of its release, the film was perceived as a box-office failure, with overall losses totaling approximately $3 million.

== Plot ==
Once an established movie star, Jack Andrus has hit rock bottom. An alcoholic, he has been divorced by wife Carlotta, barely survived a car crash, and spent three years in a sanitarium recovering from a nervous breakdown.

Maurice Kruger, a film director who was something of a mentor to Andrus, is a has-been. However, he has landed a job in Italy, directing a movie that stars Davie Drew, a handsome, up-and-coming young actor.

Andrus is offered a chance to come to Rome and play a role in Kruger's new film. He is crestfallen upon arriving when told that the part is no longer available to him. Kruger's mean-spirited wife Clara doesn't pity him a bit, but Andrus is invited to take a lesser job assisting at Cinecittà Studio with the dubbing of the actors' lines.

While working, he socializes with the beautiful Veronica, but she actually is in love with Drew. The actor is having a great deal of difficulty with his part, and the movie is over budget and behind schedule. Kruger's stress is increased by the constant harping of Clara, resulting in a heart attack that sends the director to the hospital.

Andrus is asked to take over the director's chair and complete the film. Glad to do this favor for Kruger, he takes charge and gets the film back on schedule. The actors respond to him so much that Drew's representatives tell Andrus the actor will insist on his directing Drew's next film.

Proud of what he has done, Andrus goes to Kruger in the hospital, delighted to report the progress he's made, only to be attacked by Clara for trying to undermine Kruger and steal his movie from him. Andrus is shocked when Kruger sides with her.

An all-night descent into an alcohol-fueled rage follows. Carlotta goes along as a drunken Andrus gets behind the wheel of a car and races through the streets of Rome, nearly killing both of them.

At the last minute, Andrus comes to his senses. He vows to return home, continue his sobriety and get his life back on track.

== Cast ==
- Kirk Douglas as Jack Andrus
- Edward G. Robinson as Maurice Kruger
- Cyd Charisse as Carlotta
- Claire Trevor as Clara Kruger
- Daliah Lavi as Veronica
- George Hamilton as Davie Drew
- Rosanna Schiaffino as Barzelli
- James Gregory as Tom Byrd
- Mino Doro as film producer Tucino
- Vito Scotti as assistant director
- Joan Young as Tina, Sanitarium Nurse (uncredited)

== Production ==
Two Weeks in Another Town was created by the same team that worked on The Bad and the Beautiful: director (Vincente Minnelli), producer (John Houseman), screenwriter (Charles Schnee), composer (David Raksin), male star (Kirk Douglas), and studio (MGM). Both movies feature performances of the song "Don't Blame Me": by Leslie Uggams in Two Weeks in Another Town and by Peggy King in The Bad and the Beautiful. In one scene of the former, the cast watches clips from The Bad and the Beautiful in a screening room, presented as a movie in which Douglas's character, Jack Andrus, had starred. Two Weeks in Another Town is not a sequel, however; the characters in the two stories are unrelated.

George Hamilton was cast as "a troubled, funky James Dean-type actor, for which I couldn't have been less appropriate" as he later admitted.

In the scene where Jack Andrus searches for David Drew in nightclubs in Rome, the song is "O' Pellirossa" featuring the Italian singer and drummer Gegè Di Giacomo.

The adult subject matter ran into problems with the MPAA and the conservative studio executives at MGM. Joseph Vogel, the new studio head, wanted to transform the project into a "family film" and had it re-edited without Minnelli's input, reducing the total running time by 15 minutes. Both Minnelli and Houseman protested but to no avail. An orgy-party scene inspired by Federico Fellini's La Dolce Vita was deleted as well as a melancholy monologue by Cyd Charisse that was supposed to humanize her character. Kirk Douglas later wrote in his 1988 autobiography that "this was such an injustice to Vincente Minnelli, who'd done such a wonderful job with the film. And an injustice to the paying public, who could have had the experience of watching a very dramatic, meaningful film. They released it that way, emasculated."

The Maserati Kirk Douglas drives is a 3500 GT Spyder.

== Reception ==
=== Box office ===
According to MGM records, the film earned $1 million in the U.S. and Canada and $1.5 million elsewhere, resulting in an overall loss of $2,969,000. Variety reported it earned over $1 million in distributor rentals in the U.S. and Canada.

=== Critical reaction ===
Bosley Crowther of The New York Times wrote: "The whole thing is a lot of glib trade patter, ridiculous and unconvincing snarls and a weird professional clash between the actor and director that is like something out of a Hollywood cartoon. Mr. Schnee's script is as aimless and arbitrary in its development of a plot as the script for one of those crowded Cinecitta spear-and-sandals spectacles, and the character it sets up for Mr. Douglas is no more intelligible or convincing than Steve Reeves' Hercules." Larry Tubelle of Variety felt the film was "not an achievement about which any of these creative people are apt to boast" as he complained "the characters are despicable as they are complex" and the photography was "evident but overshadowed by the overall dramatic mediocrity." Harrison's Reports was critical of the script, writing "it failed in its fashioning into a powerful film yarn with all its emotional impact, plot-structural smoothness and dramatic tightness. It does not come through as a highly entertaining release."

The Chicago Tribune criticized the characters, publishing: "The scenery has a certain amount of charm, but the same can hardly be said for the people. They're a scheming, quarrelsome lot constantly trying to knife each other, both literally and figuratively [...] The acting is capable enough, but I found it hard to care very much about any of the characters." Time magazine questioned: "Why is everybody so nasty? The script does not say. It simply leaves the customers to assume that Hollywood, no matter where you find it, is hell, and the people who run it are devils. It may be so, but this movie won't make anybody believe it or even care."

John Russell Taylor of Sight and Sound criticized Minnelli's direction, writing "the early sequences are handled rather stolidly and sluggishly" and felt the frenzied car ride "comes dangerously close to self-parody." Philip K. Scheuer of the Los Angeles Times felt "Minnelli has erred in staging it as heavy melodrama (which contrarily, I felt did suit the milieu of his previous 'Four Horsemen') and in allowing it if encouraging several of his players to exaggerate their theatrics to the verge of burlesque."

The film's reputation has greatly improved over time. On the review aggregator website Rotten Tomatoes, 89% of 9 critics' reviews are positive, with an average rating of 6.4/10. Richard Brody of The New Yorker called Two Weeks in Another Town "one of the sharpest and most perceptive movies about the film industry." David Thomson called it "underrated," writing in The New Biographical Dictionary of Film that the film was "invested with such intense psychological detail that the narrative faults vanish." Jonathan Rosenbaum wrote that it was "one of [Minnelli]'s last great pictures...The costumes, decor, and 'Scope compositions show Minnelli at his most expressive, and the gaudy intensity—as well as the inside detail about the movie business—makes this compulsively watchable."

== See also ==
- List of American films of 1962
