= The Next Voice You Hear... =

1950 film

- Directed by: William A. Wellman
- Written by: Charles Schnee
- Story by: George Sumner Albee
- Produced by: Dore Schary
- Starring: James Whitmore; Nancy Davis
- Cinematography: William Mellor
- Edited by: John Dunning
- Music by: David Raksin
- Distributed by: Metro-Goldwyn-Mayer
- Release date: June 29, 1950 (New York)
- Running time: 83 minutes
- Country: United States
- Language: English
- Budget: $421,000
- Box office: $788,000

The Next Voice You Hear... is a 1950 American drama film directed by William Wellman, produced by Dore Schary and starring James Whitmore and Nancy Davis. It is based on a short story of the same name written by George Sumner Albee that had been published in the August 1948 issue of Cosmopolitan magazine.

An exhaustive description of the making of the film is the subject of producer Dore Schary's book Case History of a Movie. The film is also discussed at length in Foster Hirsch's book Hollywood and the Movies of the Fifties, in which Hirsch writes that the film "attempts to close the gap between the daily and the divine".

== Plot summary ==
Joe and Mary Smith, with their son Johnny, are a typical American family. Joe works at an aircraft factory and deals with the usual annoyances of modern life. Mary is pregnant with their second child. One day, Joe reports to Mary that he had heard a voice on the radio proclaiming to be that of God. Mary is skeptical until she also hears the voice. The voice later returns to the airwaves and is heard around the globe in all of the languages of the world. Joe's atheistic boss derides those believing the voice to be that of God, but many come to believe in the divinity of the radio messages. Joe sees changes in his life and begins to understand God's message for humanity, to slow down and recognize the many small miracles in people's everyday lives. As Joe's church congregation eagerly awaits the next message from a radio in the church, God falls silent.

== Cast ==
- James Whitmore as Joe Smith
- Nancy Davis as Mrs. Joe Smith
- Gary Gray as Johnny Smith, their son
- Lillian Bronson as Aunt Ethel
- Art Smith as Mr. Brannan
- Tom D'Andrea as Hap Magee
- Jeff Corey as Freddie

== Production ==
George Sumner Albee's story "The Next Voice You Hear..." was published in the August 1948 issue of Cosmopolitan magazine. The story differs from the film in several key aspects, as it mainly focuses on the reaction of the general public rather than that of an ordinary American family. The story includes God's exact words, which are not heard in the film. The resistance to believe in a divine source leads atheist organizations, university professors and the Kremlin to loudly protest, with the Soviets accusing the West of a capitalist conspiracy. God responds by causing miracles to occur around the globe, each 50 miles apart. When some cynics continue to protest and refuse to believe, God performs the ultimate miracle by submerging Australia underwater for one minute.

Producer and MGM production head Dore Schary was drawn to the story for its spiritual tone and acquired the rights to Albee's story, but Schary did not wish to create an epic supernatural film with special effects depicting the miracles described in the story. He wrote a 10,000-word treatment based on the story's general theme but placed the focus on the Smith family and their reaction to the messages. Rather than the spectacular miracles of the original story, Schary focused on everyday miracles, such as childbirth.

Schary was also drawn to the project because it challenged traditional film-industry wisdom that religious films and those with underlying messages were poison at the box office. It represented Schary's struggle with studio head Louis B. Mayer over the types of films that the studio should produce; Mayer favored star-powered, lavish productions, while Schary sought more realistic, edgier material such as the previous year's Battleground, also featuring James Whitmore. For The Next Voice You Hear..., Schary tried to avoid the trappings of a star-studded cast and instead assigned the lead roles to little-known MGM contract players James Whitmore and Nancy Davis.

Production of the film spanned just 14 days following four days of rehearsals, a greatly condensed schedule in comparison to that of typical features produced by the major studios. The set was closed in order to preserve the secrecy of the film's subject matter. Defying the conventional image of pregnant women on the screen who typically wore full-length jackets known as "butcher boys", Nancy Davis was fitted to look realistically pregnant, wearing no cosmetics and with her costume fitted with pounds of cotton and gauze.

The film's modest budget of $600,000 was considered an experiment for MGM, where the standard budget for a feature film had exceeded $1,000,000. The budget was the lowest for any MGM feature since World War II and the experiment, directly supervised by Schary, was regarded as an important effort for the studio.

The unexpected box-office success of The Next Voice You Hear... bolstered Schary's status at MGM and placed him further at odds with Mayer, who would resign in August 1951.

== Release ==
The film's world premiere was held at Radio City Music Hall in New York on June 29, 1950 as part of the theater's festivities preceding Independence Day, which included a patriotic pageant, stage shows and an electrical fireworks display.

== Reception ==
In a contemporary review for the Los Angeles Times, critic John L. Scott wrote:

"The Next Voice You Hear" is an extreme departure from usual motion picture fare and is bound to cause unusual comment and some controversy. The film's appeal must be judged by each individual who sees it ... because it is too far off the beaten track to he considered from the average movie fan's (or critic's) viewpoint. ... Production values are modest, judged by most Metro standards, though considerable praise should be sent the way of William Wellman for holding a tight rein on histrionics which might have gone overboard. It also took courage to tackle such a subject. There are scenes in "The Next Voice" that should prove immensely affecting to those emotionally inclined. ... "The Next Voice You Hear" is ingenious and practically unparalleled, in its way, in movie history. You may not he entirely satisfied with it but the film is certainly worth seeing."

Critic Bosley Crowther of The New York Times lamented that "some of the smug and easy clichés that are used to propel the plot" but wrote: "[W]e must acknowledge that this is not an intellectual film. It is strictly and candidly emotional. It is a compound of humor, sentiment and romance—and that element of mysticism which the average person can seldom resist."

Variety called the film an "unusual picture experience" that was "beautifully handled in the understanding writing, direction and playing."

According to MGM records, the film earned $668,000 in the U.S. and Canada and $120,000 overseas, resulting in a profit to the studio of $367,000.

== Music ==
The film's score was composed by David Raksin and conducted by Raksin and Johnny Green. The hymnlike theme used for the main and end titles was later published as "Hasten the Day", with lyrics by Norman Corwin.

Surviving portions of Raksin's score, excluding some source music, were released on compact disc in 2009 on the Film Score Monthly label.
