= Lady at Midnight =

1948 film directed by Sam Newfield

- Directed by: Sam Newfield
- Written by: Richard Sale
- Produced by: John Sutherland
- Starring: Richard Denning; Frances Rafferty; Claudia Drake
- Cinematography: Jack Greenhalgh
- Edited by: Martin G. Cohn
- Music by: Leo Erdody
- Production company: John Sutherland Productions
- Distributed by: Eagle-Lion Films
- Release date: August 15, 1948
- Running time: 62 minutes
- Country: United States
- Language: English

Lady at Midnight is a 1948 American mystery film directed by Sam Newfield and starring Richard Denning, Frances Rafferty, and Claudia Drake.

The film's sets were designed by the art director Edward C. Jewell. It was shot at the Universal Studios.

== Cast ==
- Richard Denning as Peter Wiggins
- Frances Rafferty as Ellen McPhail Wiggins
- Lora Lee Michel as Tina Wiggins
- Ralph Dunn as Al Garrity
- Nana Bryant as Lydia Forsythe
- Jackie Searl as Freddy Forsythe
- Harlan Warde as Ross Atherton
- Claudia Drake as Carolyn 'Sugar' Gold
- Ben Welden as Willie Gold
- Rodney Bell as Joe Kelly - Pete's Co-Worker
- Ben Erway as Dr. Adams
- William Gould as Police Chief Mulhare
- Sid Melton as Benny Muscle
- Lee Roberts as Police Detective
- Pierre Watkin as John Featherstone

== Bibliography ==
- Langman, Larry. A Guide to American Film Directors: the Sound Era, 1929-1979, Volume 2. Scarecrow Press, 1981
