= Ben Winkler =

American sound engineer

- Born: Benjamin Winkler; May 25, 1902; The Bronx, New York, U.S.
- Died: February 22, 1979 (aged 76); Pacific Palisades, California, U.S.
- Occupation: Sound engineer
- Years active: 1929–1971

Benjamin Winkler (May 25, 1902 – February 22, 1979) was an American sound engineer in the American film industry having more than 135 credits to his name. Born in The Bronx, New York. His film credits included Money Madness, D.O.A., The Texan Meets Calamity Jane, The Jackie Robinson Story and Doctor Jim.

Winkler died on February 22, 1979 in Pacific Palisades, California, at the age of 76.
