= Doctor Jim =

1947 film by Lew Landers

- Directed by: Lew Landers
- Screenplay by: Lou Lilly; Lyle Robertson
- Starring: Stuart Erwin; Barbara Woodell; William Wright
- Cinematography: Allen G. Siegler
- Edited by: William Faris
- Release date: 1947
- Running time: 48 minutes
- Country: USA
- Language: English

Doctor Jim is a 1947 American drama film directed by Lew Landers and starring Stuart Erwin.

Oscar P. Yerg served as the art director for the film. Ben Winkler served as the sound engineer for the film.

== Cast ==
- Stuart Erwin as Dr. James Gateson
- Barbara Woodell as Sally Gateson
- William Wright as Dr. Sylvester
- Hobart Cavanaugh as Mayor
- Netta Packer as Emily
- William Schallert as George Brant
- William Newell as Editor
- Gloria Grant as Camille
