= Money Madness (1948 film) =

1948 film by Sam Newfield

- Theatrical release poster
- Directed by: Sam Newfield
- Screenplay by: Al Martin
- Story by: Al Martin
- Produced by: Sigmund Neufeld
- Starring: Hugh Beaumont; Frances Rafferty
- Cinematography: Jack Greenhalgh
- Edited by: Holbrook N. Todd
- Music by: Leo Erdody
- Production company: Sigmund Neufeld Productions
- Distributed by: Film Classics
- Release date: April 15, 1948 (United States)
- Running time: 73 minutes
- Country: United States
- Language: English

Money Madness is a 1948 film noir mystery film directed by Sam Newfield starring Hugh Beaumont and Frances Rafferty.

== Plot ==
Steve Clark (Hugh Beaumont) is on a Los Angeles-bound bus and gets off in a small town en route. In his suitcase he has been carrying loot from a bank robbery; he stashes it in a safety deposit box. He becomes a taxi driver, which leads him to a chance encounter with Julie Saunders (Frances Rafferty), a local woman in her 20s. Julie lives with an elderly, bitter aunt who makes her life miserable. Clark, with his charm and original outlook on life, instantly becomes a ray of sunlight for her, and they quickly marry.

However, Clark soon admits to her that the marriage is part of a plan he has crafted, to help him launder his ill-gotten cash—but it also involves murder and will make Julie an accessory to it, against her will.

== Cast ==
- Hugh Beaumont as Steve Clark
- Frances Rafferty as Julie
- Harlan Warde as Donald
- Cecil Weston as Cora
- Ida Moore as Mrs. Ferguson
- Danny Morton as Rogers
- Joel Friedkin as Mr. Wagner
- Lane Chandler as Policeman

== Reception ==
=== Critical response ===
Film critic Dennis Schwartz, while giving the film a mixed review, liked the feature, writing, "A low-grade film noir that has its chilling moments. It opens with Julie Saunders (Frances Rafferty) sentenced to a prison term of ten years for being an accomplice to murder. A flashback is used to show how a sweet girl like Julie could have gotten into such deep trouble ... Beaumont went on to be Ward Cleaver in television's Leave It to Beaver, but here he's great to watch as a sleazeball and sicko killer. It's film where it takes a suspension of belief to get through all the problems built into the implausible plot, but nevertheless the film has a certain insanity kicking in that somehow works to give it an edge."

=== Production ===
Ben Winkler served as the sound engineer for the film.
