= John Patrick Gillese =

Canadian author (1920–1999)

- Born: March 7, 1920; Ireland
- Died: 23 October 1999 (aged 79); Edmonton, Canada
- Occupation: Author
- Spouse: Thelma Elizabeth Ashby (1937–2023)
- Children: 7
- Relatives: Kevin Gillese (grandchild)
- Writing career
- Notable awards: Vicky Metcalf Award (1967)

John Patrick Gillese (Ireland, March 7, 1920 – Edmonton, Canada, 23 October 1999) was an Irish-born Canadian author whose prolific career spanned six decades from the early 1940s to the late 1990s. During this period he authored over 5,000 pieces including novels, short stories, and information columns that were published in many English-speaking countries.

His 1957 novel, Kirby's Gander, retitled Wings of Chance, was the first full-length feature film ever shot in Canada by a Hollywood production company and was pivotal in the launching of Canada's professional film industry.

Born in Ireland, his family moved to Rochfort Bridge, Alberta, when he was six years old. In 1947, he married Thelma Elizabeth Ashby with whom he would have six children. They later adopted a child who had fled the war in El Salvador. He has 4 great-grandchildren and 23 grandchildren, including Canadian comedian/writer Kevin Gillese, and actress/writer Meeshelle Neal.

As a founding director of Alberta Culture's Film and Literary Arts Branch, which he headed from 1971 to 1984, he was able to help many writers become established through workshops and contests; including the author of the book which launched the hit movie and subsequent television series 'Stargate,' Pauline Gedge.

In addition to receiving the CAA Vicky Metcalf Award for Literature for Young People (1967), the Writers' Guild of Alberta Lifetime Achievement Award (1995), the City of Edmonton Outstanding Citizen Award, the Western Canadian Book Publishers' Association Award, and an Outstanding Albertans award, Gillese earned dozens of additional accolades, recognition and awards.

Upon his death, the city of Edmonton named a park in his honour.
