= How to Steal a Million =

1966 film by William Wyler

- Theatrical release poster by Robert McGinnis
- Directed by: William Wyler
- Screenplay by: Harry Kurnitz
- Based on: "Venus Rising"; 1962 story in Practise to Deceive by George Bradshaw
- Produced by: Fred Kohlmar
- Starring: Audrey Hepburn; Peter O'Toole; Eli Wallach; Hugh Griffith; Charles Boyer
- Cinematography: Charles Lang
- Edited by: Robert Swink
- Music by: John Williams
- Production company: World Wide Productions
- Distributed by: 20th Century-Fox
- Release date: July 13, 1966 (United States)
- Running time: 123 minutes
- Country: United States
- Language: English
- Budget: $6.4 million
- Box office: $4.4 million (US rentals)

How to Steal a Million is a 1966 American heist comedy film directed by William Wyler and starring Audrey Hepburn, Peter O'Toole, Eli Wallach, Hugh Griffith, and Charles Boyer. The film is set and was filmed in Paris, though the characters speak entirely in English.

Hepburn's clothes were designed by Givenchy.

== Plot ==
Prominent Paris art collector Charles Bonnet forges and sells famous artists' paintings. His disapproving daughter, Nicole, constantly fears his being caught. Late one night at their mansion, Nicole encounters a burglar, Simon Dermott, holding her father's forged "Van Gogh". She threatens him with an antique gun that accidentally fires, slightly wounding his arm. Wanting to avoid an investigation that would uncover her father's fake masterpieces, Nicole tends to his wound but does not contact the police. She drives the charming Simon to his lavish hotel in his expensive sports car, then takes a cab home.

Charles is lending the Kléber-Lafayette Museum his renowned "Cellini" Venus statuette for an exhibition. The forged statue was actually sculpted by his father. Charles has never sold it, knowing scientific testing would reveal it as a fake, rendering his entire collection suspect. After Charles signs the museum's standard insurance policy, he learns that it requires a forensic examination. Withdrawing the Venus from the exhibition would raise suspicions. Desperate to protect her father, Nicole asks Simon to steal the Venus before the examination. They visit the museum together to observe electronic security conditions guarding the Venus and the guards' routine. Simon claims it is impossible to steal the Venus, but falling for Nicole, he changes his mind and comes up with a plan.

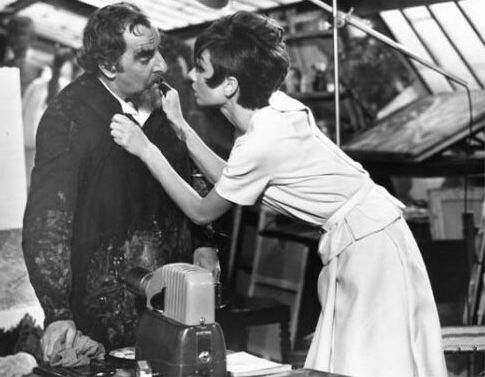
Hugh Griffith and Audrey Hepburn in a scene from How to Steal a Million (1966)

American tycoon Davis Leland, an avid art collector, is obsessed with owning the Venus. He arranges to meet Nicole solely to purchase the statue but finds her attractive. To obtain the statue, at their second meeting, Leland proposes marriage to an uninterested and distracted Nicole. Pressed for time to get to the museum for the "heist," Nicole hurriedly accepts his unwanted ring as she rushes off.

Nicole and Simon hide in the museum's utility closet until closing time. When Simon notices Nicole's resemblance to the Venus, she admits her grandmother posed for the statue her grandfather sculpted. Simon admits knowing the Venus is fake and only agreeing to the heist to help her out of a jam. After the museum empties and the guards finish their rounds, Simon repeatedly sets off the security alarm using a toy boomerang until the "faulty" system is finally disabled. Taking the Venus from its pedestal, Simon gives it to Nicole, disguised as a cleaning woman. She hides it in a bucket, mixes with the cleaning crew scrubbing floors, and discreetly makes her way toward the exit. When the Venus is discovered missing, they escape in the ensuing chaos.

Following the robbery, Leland seeks to acquire the Venus by any means. Posing as a tough criminal, Simon offers to "sell" it to him on condition that it never be displayed to anyone and that he never contact the Bonnet family again. Simon instructs that Leland will be contacted later for payment. When Nicole tries to return the engagement ring, Leland runs from her. Simon later secretly adds the ring to boxed statue before giving it to Leland, who immediately leaves the country with it.

To celebrate their success, Nicole meets Simon at the Ritz Hotel; she is stunned when he admits it was his first heist. Simon is actually an expert consultant and investigator hired by major art galleries to enhance security and detect forgeries. When Nicole first encountered him, he was investigating Charles' art collection. Arriving unexpectedly, Charles meets Simon, who assures him that the statue will soon be safely out of the country. Charles is relieved, though momentarily disappointed that there will be no $1 Million insurance payment because the statue was never authenticated. Observing that their professions are at odds, Simon insists Charles give up forgery, to which he agrees.

As Nicole and Simon are on their way to get married, a collector who admired Charles's new "Van Gogh" arrives at the Bonnet residence. Nicole tells Simon that it is his father's "cousin". Simon admires her newfound flair for lying, and they drive off to begin their new life together.

== Cast ==
- Audrey Hepburn as Nicole Bonnet, the daughter of Charles Bonnet
- Peter O'Toole as Simon Dermott, the "thief" who helps Nicole to steal back the Venus
- Eli Wallach as Davis Leland
- Hugh Griffith as Charles Bonnet, an art forger and owner of the Venus. His father sculpted the Venus after his mother.
- Charles Boyer as DeSolnay
- Fernand Gravey as Grammont
- Marcel Dalio as Señor Paravideo
- Jacques Marin as chief guard
- Moustache as guard
- Roger Tréville as auctioneer
- Eddie Malin as insurance clerk

== Production ==
=== Filming ===
Principal photography began in the late summer of 1965, and concluded later that fall. How To Steal A Million was Hepburn's first time on a film set in two years since the production of My Fair Lady in 1963. According to some accounts, some dismay was made over the fact that Hepburn was three years older than O'Toole, him being 33 years old and her 36 years old at the time, as historically Hepburn had always been considerably younger than her co-stars. Hepburn’s salary for the film was reportedly $1,000,000.

== Reception ==
In a New York Times review, critic Bosley Crowther called the plot "preposterous" but added, "It is still a delightful lot of flummery while it is going on, especially the major, central business of burglarizing the museum."

The LIFE magazine review was mixed: “for its first hour William Wyler’s film rests heavily merely upon its comic potentials. Instead of jokes we have a collection of views…of Paris…views of posh interiors and of Miss Hepburn modeling a succession of Givenchy frocks….the truth is that for far too long [the film] is just another distressingly ‘big’ comedy of our times, overdressed and underfunny. Then, just when all seems lost, a very nice thing happens....For reasons too complicated to go into, it becomes necessary for Miss Hepburn and Mr. O’Toole to steal a bit of statuary from a heavily guarded museum....From this unlikely command post they engineer a fine, funny filch....I would not go so far as to say that their half hour in the closet saves the picture, but it certainly makes it bearable and, more important, it offers a valuable lesson in the virtues of economy....[the] failure to provide substantial material for Eli Wallach and Charles Boyer in supporting roles...are acts of negligence bordering on the criminal. It's annoying that Wyler and Kurnitz waited so long to prove they of the stuff of solid comedy within them. I suggest you plan to arrive in the middle of the picture.”

On Rotten Tomatoes, the film holds an approval rating of 100% based on reviews from 11 critics, with an average rating of 7.1/10.

=== Box office ===
According to 20th Century-Fox accounts, the film needed to earn $12 million in rentals to break even and made $10.45 million, meaning it made a loss.

== Popular culture ==
- A verbal exchange between Nicole and her father during the film ("Papa!" "Nicole") was borrowed and adapted in a successful series of commercials for the Renault Clio.
- The robbery scenes in the film were copied for the Hindi film Loafer (1973) and the Tamil film Lingaa (2014).
- The robbery scenes are also copied in the Argentine film Heroic Losers (2019). In that film, the characters are inspired by How to Steal a Million to commit their crimes.
