= Second Fiddle (1939 film) =

1939 film by Sidney Lanfield

- Theatrical poster
- Directed by: Sidney Lanfield
- Based on: "Heart Interest" by George Bradshaw
- Produced by: Gene Markey
- Starring: Sonja Henie; Tyrone Power
- Release date: July 14, 1939
- Running time: 85 minutes
- Country: United States
- Language: English

Second Fiddle is a 1939 American musical romance film directed by Sidney Lanfield, starring Sonja Henie, Tyrone Power, Rudy Vallée and Lyle Talbot and released by 20th Century Fox. The score was composed by Irving Berlin. The screenplay, based on George Bradshaw's story Heart Interest, involves a Hollywood publicity agent who falls in love with a new actress he helped to discover. The film combines a parody of the extensive search for an actress to play Scarlett O'Hara in Gone with the Wind with a Cyrano de Bergerac–type plot. It is sometimes known as Irving Berlin's Second Fiddle.

== Plot ==
Jimmy Sutton, the publicity agent of a major Hollywood studio, is taking part in the search to find an actress to star in an adaptation of a best-selling novel, Girl of the North. After over 400 actresses have been tested and rejected, he is sent to the small town of Bergen, Minnesota to meet Trudi Hovland, a schoolteacher whose photo and details were unknowingly submitted to the studio. She is doubtful, but with the entire town backing her, Jimmy persuades her to return to Hollywood with him. After he takes her back to Los Angeles, she tries for and secures the role.

In an effort to boost their popularity, Jimmy organizes a fake romance between Trudi and another Hollywood star, Roger Maxwell. He neglects to tell Trudi that Roger is already romantically involved with another actress and is only interested in publicity.

Problems arise when Trudi, unaware that the romance is fake, falls in love with Roger just as Jimmy begins to realize that he has feelings for Trudi himself. He pours his efforts into writing her poems and songs, purportedly from Roger. When she discovers that the romance is a fake, she flees back to Minnesota. She misses the premiere of her film, which proves to be a runaway hit. Jimmy travels to see her, hoping to secure her forgiveness and tell her about his feelings. To his horror, he discovers that she has gone on a road trip to get married on the rebound to a local she is not really in love with. He hurries after her to prevent the wedding but seemingly arrives too late.

== Cast ==
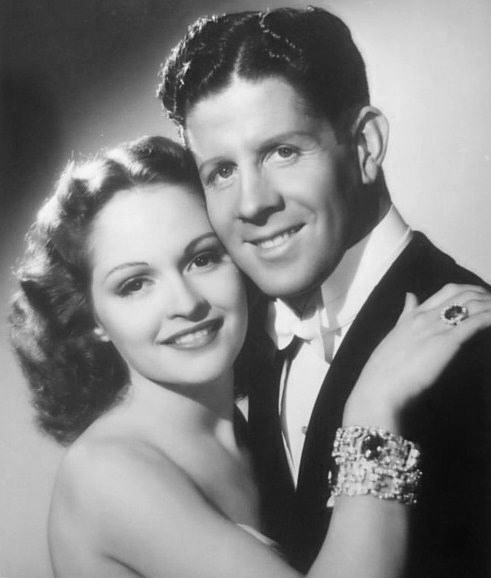
Mary Healy and Rudy Vallée in Second Fiddle

- Sonja Henie – Trudi Hovland
- Tyrone Power – Jimmy Sutton
- Rudy Vallée – Roger Maxwell
- Edna May Oliver – Aunt Phoebe
- Mary Healy – Jean Varick
- Lyle Talbot – Willie Hogger
- Alan Dinehart – George 'Whit' Whitney
- Minna Gombell – Jenny
- Stewart Reburn – Skating Partner
- Spencer Charters – Joe Clayton
- George Chandler – Taxi Driver
- Irving Bacon – First Justice of the Peace
- Maurice Cass – Second Justice of the Peace
- John Hiestand – Announcer
- Charles Lane – Voice of the Studio Chief
- The Brian Sisters – Themselves
- Leyland Hodgson – Henry

== Bibliography ==
- Hemming, Roy. The Melody Lingers On: The Great Songwriters and their Movie Musicals . Newmarket Press, 1999.
