= Prison Warden (film) =

1949 film by Seymour Friedman

- Directed by: Seymour Friedman
- Written by: Eric Taylor
- Produced by: Rudolph C. Flothow
- Starring: Warner Baxter; Anna Lee; Harlan Warde
- Cinematography: Henry Freulich
- Edited by: James Sweeney
- Production company: Columbia Pictures
- Distributed by: Columbia Pictures
- Release date: October 20, 1949
- Running time: 62 minutes
- Country: United States
- Language: English

Prison Warden is a 1949 American film noir crime film directed by Seymour Friedman and starring Warner Baxter, Anna Lee and Harlan Warde.

== Cast ==
- Warner Baxter as Warden Victor Burnell
- Anna Lee as Elisa Pennington Burnell
- Harlan Warde as Albert Gardner
- James Flavin as Guard Capt. Peter Butler
- Charles Cane as Quarry Supervisor Captain Bill Radford
- Reginald Sheffield as English Charlie / Watkins the Butler
- Heinie Conklin as Toulouse, the Cook

== Bibliography ==
- Blottner, Gene. Columbia Noir: A Complete Filmography, 1940-1962. McFarland, 2015.
