= Lora Lee Michel =

American actress (born 1940)

- Born: Virginia Joy Willeford; September 13, 1940; La Grange, Texas, US
- Disappeared: (1979)
- Occupation: Child actress
- Years active: 1948–1972
- Spouses: Donald Mayo Ford (m. 1958; div. 1958) Joe Wendel Owen (m. 1960; sep. 1960) Carey Hand Bray (m. 1960; sep. 1961) Frank O'Neil Scot (m. 1961; sep. 1962)
- Children: 2

Lora Lee Michel (born Virginia Joy Willeford, September 13, 1940) is an American former child actress. She appeared in several feature films during the Golden Age of Hollywood in the late 1940s and early 1950s. In 1950, she was the focus of a custody dispute in Beverly Hills, California, in which she alleged that her adoptive mother had beaten and starved her. She came to public attention again in 1963 when she and her third husband were sentenced in federal court for stealing a car and driving it across state lines. After her release from prison, she disappeared. It is believed she died from cancer in 1979.

== Early life and family ==
Michel was born in La Grange, Texas, on September 13, 1940, to Willie Walker Willeford and Lena Smith Brunson. Brunson gave Michel and two other younger siblings up for adoption when Michel was five years old. She was adopted by Otto and Lorraine Michel in Schulenburg, Texas. As of 2014, Michel has one living sister, Barbara Michel Wright.

== Career ==
Michel was a successful child actress in the late 1940s. By the age of 9, she was earning $100 a day (equivalent to $1,400 in 2025). By her own count, she appeared in 19 films.

== Custody trial ==
In 1950, Michel told one of her friends that her adoptive mother Lorraine Michel was "starving her to keep her small and slim so that she could continue to get screen roles," leading to Lorraine's arrest. Lora Lee's birth mother, Lena Brunson, alerted by the resulting publicity, filed a countersuit in a Beverly Hills court to reclaim custody of her daughter. During the custody hearing, a widely publicized fist fight occurred between Mrs. Brunson and Lora Lee's former agent and drama coach Ona Wargin on one side and Mrs. Michel and her friend Mrs. Effie Forrest on the other, when Mrs. Brunson attempted to hug and physically hold Michel.

At the trial, a clergyman testified that Michel appeared to him to have been "terribly bruised", which the girl claimed was from physical punishment administered by Lorraine. He said he had seen Michel at the home of her drama coach and that she had "black and blue marks on her arms, shoulders, buttocks and legs." However, Michel contradicted his testimony, saying she had not been physically punished but had only been sent to bed. The girl's drama coach backed the claim that Michel was being starved by her adopted parents, testifying that Lorraine had said, "I am determined to conquer her gluttonous appetite." But the judge, who questioned Michel's veracity, ruled the adoption was legal and awarded custody to the Michels and told them to take her back to Texas so she could live a "normal life."

== Later life ==
Back in Texas, Michel was enrolled at Saint Agnes Academy in Houston and performed in some local theatrical productions. During one of these performances in 1952, she was bitten by a dog. Her adoptive father sued the American Automobile Insurance Company, claiming her career would be affected by facial disfigurement. The court awarded $1,000 in damages (equivalent to $12,100 in 2025).

On February 28, 1958, Michel married Donald Mayo Ford at the age of 17. Michel gave birth to a girl named Donna Ann, who she put up for adoption. Ford later told authorities that they divorced in November or December 1958. On February 12, 1959 Michel gave birth to a son named William Henry. He was born with congenital atelectasis, and died the same day. In February 1960, she met Joe Wendel Owen, and they wed on March 5, 1960. After two weeks of marriage, Michel left him but did not legally divorce him. In August 1960, Michel married Carey Hand Bray, a Houston pharmacist. Bray later told investigators that they divorced on November 7, 1961, although a divorce record has not been located.

In February 1961, Michel moved to Corpus Christi. She was working as a waitress in a night club when she met Frank O'Neil Scott. Scott was a former Marine sergeant who had served in the Korean War, before enlisting in the Army. Although they were both legally married to other people, they married on July 22, 1961. Scott deserted the Army in February 1962, and Michel and Scott began engaging in various schemes. She and Scott were arrested in El Paso, Texas, in December 1962 and charged in federal court with driving a stolen car over state lines. According to newspaper reports, she and Scott had stolen a 1957 Mercury demonstration model in Jonesboro, Arkansas, and driven it to Houston. They then embarked on a six-month trip around the southern and eastern United States after stealing Michel's ex-husband's car, a Ford convertible, and used three credit cards they found in the glove compartment to run up $3,700 in bills (equivalent to $38,900 in 2025). Scott was sentenced to 27 months in federal prison while Michel was sentenced to 13 months at the Federal Women's Institution in Alderson, West Virginia. After her release, Michel disappeared.

In May 2022, the Los Angeles Times published an article by writer Stacy Perman titled "What happened to former child star Lora Lee Michel?" In the article, Michel's sister Barbara Wright Isaacs was reported to still be searching for Michel after a period of 55 years, believing "she's either got to be dead or doesn't want to be found." Perman ultimately discovered notes kept by Michel's second husband, Joe Wendel Owen, which suggested that Michel had died in 1979 of cancer.

== Filmography ==
Year	Film	Role
1948	Parlor, Bedroom and Wrath	Ed's daughter (uncredited)
1948	Good Sam	Lulu
1948	The Snake Pit	Virginia, age 6
1948	Lady at Midnight	Tina Wiggins
1948	Kiss the Blood Off My Hands	Little Girl (uncredited)
1949	Tokyo Joe	Anya
1949	State Department: File 649	Jessica
1949	Mr. Soft Touch	Sonya
1949	Mighty Joe Young	Jill, age 7
1950	Paid in Full	Joanne
1950	Between Midnight and Dawn	Kathy
1950	It's a Small World	Janie, age 8
