= Gertrude Purcell =

American screenwriter

- Born: June 14, 1895; New York City, New York, U.S.
- Died: May 1, 1963 (aged 67); Los Angeles, California, U.S.
- Education: Hunter College; Columbia University
- Occupations: Screenwriter, playwright, stage actress
- Years active: 1930–1950

Gertrude M. Purcell (June 14, 1895 – May 1, 1963) was an American screenwriter, playwright, and stage actress known for her work on films like The Invisible Woman and Destry Rides Again.

== Biography ==
=== Early life ===
Born in Manhattan to Cornelius and Frances Purcell, Gertrude graduated from Hunter College and then took extension courses at Columbia University, where she met Leila Taylor, a journalism student. Right out of college, the two managed to get their script for Voltaire, a three-act comedy, to director Arthur Hopkins, who agreed to direct and produce it on Broadway. At the time, this made them the youngest playwrights to have a play on Broadway. Purcell also played a few parts on the stage during this time period.

=== Hollywood career ===
By the early 1930, she had begun writing and adapting screenplays under contract at Paramount Pictures, and by 1931, she had moved to Los Angeles. One of her first screenplays was the Dorothy Arzner–directed Honor Among Lovers, a Paramount film starring Claudette Colbert and Fredric March.

Purcell—who was described by a friend as a "masculine, funny, and hard-drinking woman"—worked as a freelancer for much of her career, penning scripts for most of the major studios. Her biggest Hollywood credits include The Invisible Woman, The Lady and the Mob, and Destry Rides Again. Purcell and screenwriter Edmund Hartman were supposed to write Babes on Broadway at MGM, but producer Arthur Freed fired the pair in order to assign the project to Freddy Finklehoffe.

She appears to have married writer-producer Islin Auster, who was 10 years her junior, in secret in Tijuana in 1932, but by 1940, they no longer appear to have been living together.

=== McCarthy era ===
During the McCarthy era, Purcell was noted as an "important" informer and a "cooperative witness" alongside industry insiders like Elia Kazan. She testified before the House Committee on Un-American Activities that she had been a member of the Communist Party from 1939 to 1942 but that she had quit after becoming disenchanted with its policies. "I was fed up with thought control, lack of spirit and initiative," she said at the time.

Purcell attempted suicide in the wake of her testimony, but her landlord found her in her Hollywood apartment on North Grace Street and had her transported to the hospital. "I have been out of work for a year, and I wanted to end it all," she told the police. She would never work in Hollywood again, but she would live another decade. Purcell died May 1, 1963, in Los Angeles. Her final resting place is unknown.

== Selected plays ==
- Three Little Girls (1930)
- Fancy Lady (1930)
- Luckee Girl (1928)
- The Madcap (1927)
- Just Fancy (1927)
- Listen Dearie (1926)
- The Eternal Masculine (1925)
- Tangletoes (1925)
- Stella Dallas (1924)
- Voltaire (1923)

== Selected filmography ==
- Winter Wonderland (1946)
- Madame Pimpernel (1945)
- Reckless Age (1944)
- Follow the Boys (1944)
- Ice-Capades Revue (1942)
- In California (1942)
- The Murder Ring (1941)
- False Witness (1940) (adaptation)
- The Invisible Woman (1940)
- One Night in the Tropics (1940)
- A Little Bit of Heaven (1940)
- Destry Rides Again (1939)
- The Lady and the Mob (1939)
- Mother Carey's Chickens (1938)
- Hitting a New High (1937)
- Music for Madame (1937)
- Super-Sleuth (1937)
- Make Way for a Lady (1936)
- The Witness Chair (1936)
- If You Could Only Cook (1935)
- The Girl Friend (1935)
- She Was a Lady (1934)
- The Great Schnozzle (1934)
- Cocktail Hour (1933)
- Child of Manhattan (1933)
- No More Orchids (1932)
- Vanity Street (1932)
- The Night Mayor (1932)
- The Girl Habit (1931)
- Honor Among Lovers (1931)
- The Royal Family of Broadway (1930)
- Follow the Leader (1930)
- The Sap from Syracuse (1930)
