= Paid in Full (1950 film) =

1950 film by William Dieterle

- Theatrical release poster
- Directed by: William Dieterle
- Screenplay by: Robert Blees; Charles Schnee
- Based on: Paid in Full by Frederick M. Loomis
- Produced by: Hal B. Wallis
- Starring: Robert Cummings; Lizabeth Scott; Diana Lynn; Eve Arden; Ray Collins; Frank McHugh
- Cinematography: Leo Tover
- Edited by: Warren Low
- Music by: Victor Young
- Production company: Paramount Pictures
- Distributed by: Paramount Pictures
- Release date: February 15, 1950
- Running time: 98 minutes
- Country: United States
- Language: English

Paid in Full is a 1950 American drama film directed by William Dieterle, written by Robert Blees and Charles Schnee and starring Robert Cummings, Lizabeth Scott and Diana Lynn. The film was released on February 15, 1950 by Paramount Pictures.

== Plot ==
Jane Langley, gravely ill, is found slumped over the steering wheel of her car and is rushed to the hospital. She provides a false name and asks for Dr. Fredericks, who is woken and summoned to the hospital. The doctor explains to Jane that because of her desperate condition, she must choose between the baby's life or her own. She steadfastly asserts that the child must live.

A flashback shows how things came to pass. Jane's mother died in childbirth, so Jane raised her younger sister Nancy. Now both work with advertising executive Bill Prentice, Jane as a clothing designer and Nancy as a model. Jane is in love with Bill, but Bill and Nancy marry. Nancy quickly becomes bored by married life, preferring to spend time with old friends. The idea of having a baby excites her, even though the family physician, Dr. Fredericks, has cautioned that parturition will be risky for both sisters. When Nancy's daughter Deborah is born, Nancy is possessive of the baby and treats Bill coldly, beginning to contemplate divorce.

One night after Jane and Bill begin to realize that they have feelings for each another, Nancy falsely assumes that they have had a secret affair. After an angry confrontation, Jane is distraught and tries to drive away, but as she is reversing her car to leave, she accidentally crushes Deborah, killing her. Nancy and Bill are divorced, but Nancy is traumatized by the death of her child and is undergoing therapy. The doctor tells Jane that it would help if Nancy could adopt a child. Jane hatches the idea of conceiving a child with Bill and giving it to the couple. She approaches Bill and pushes for a quick marriage in Mexico. Once she is pregnant, she runs off to have the baby, knowing that she might die in the process. The doctor has contacted Nancy and Bill, who come to see Jane on her deathbed. Jane gives them the baby, hoping that they can start over as a couple, and they name the baby Jane.

== Cast ==
- Robert Cummings as Bill Prentice
- Lizabeth Scott as Jane Langley
- Diana Lynn as Nancy Langley
- Eve Arden as Tommy Thompson
- Ray Collins as Dr. Fredericks
- Frank McHugh as Ben
- Stanley Ridges as Dr. P.J. "Phil" Winston
- Louis Jean Heydt as Dr. Carter
- John Bromfield as Dr. Clark
- Kristine Miller as Miss Williams
- Kasey Rogers as Tina
- Lora Lee Michel as Betsy

== Production ==
The script is based on a story by Dr. Frederic Loomis of Oakland, California that had appeared in Reader's Digest in April 1946. The story also became the basis of a 60,000-word novel written by Charles Bonner entitled Bitter Victory, which was also the film's working title.

Production began in late October 1948 and wrapped by early December.

== Reception ==
In a contemporary review for The New York Times, critic A. H. Weiler wrote: "[The film] is perhaps the finest example of the 'greater love hath no man" school of film entertainment to be put on view· hereabouts in a long time. For, in this lengthy yarn dealing with the succession of sacrifices made by one girl for her younger, selfish sister, all the stops have been pulled out. What emerges is a tale designed to open the tear ducts, but one which also strains credulity. And, despite the serious efforts contributed by some of the principals toward a somewhat unique plot, 'Paid in Full' is a plodding work largely lacking in genuine drama or conviction."
