= Harlan Warde =

American actor (1917–1980)

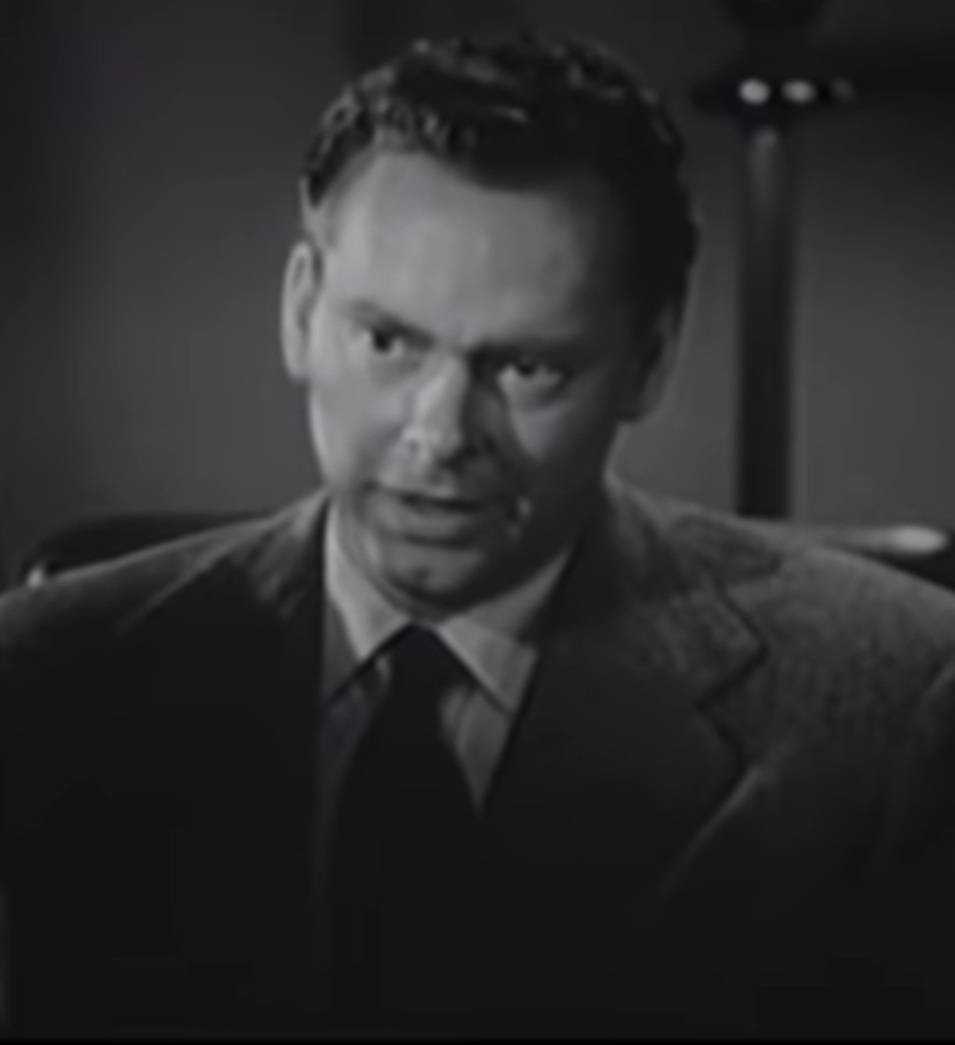
- Warde in Money Madness (1948)
- Born: Harlan Ward Lufkin; November 6, 1917; Los Angeles, California, U.S.
- Died: March 13, 1980 (aged 62); Los Angeles, California, U.S.
- Resting place: Los Angeles National Cemetery
- Occupation: Actor
- Years active: 1941–1979
- Spouses: Caroline Frances Sherwood (m. 1949; div. 1957) Barbara Grace Whittaker (m. 1958; div. 1963)

Harlan Warde (born Harlan Ward Lufkin; November 6, 1917 – March 13, 1980) was a character actor active in television and movies.

== Career ==
Warde showed up in supporting roles as detectives, doctors, and ministers. Warde made five guest appearances on Perry Mason between 1958–1966, primarily in law enforcement roles, such as Assistant District Attorney Harold Hanley in "The Case of the Haunted Husband", and Sgt. Roddin in the only color episode in 1966 entitled, "The Case of the Twice Told Twist".

From 1958–62, he joined Chuck Connors in The Rifleman. Warde played John Hamilton, President of the North Fork Bank. He appeared in eighteen episodes of The Rifleman, making his debut in season 1 episode 8, "The Safeguard." Over his 40-year-career in Hollywood, Warde appeared in over 180 films and television series, including multiple westerns.

Warde was cast in the historical role of future United States Secretary of War Edwin Stanton in the 1961 episode, "The Stolen City," on the syndicated anthology series, Death Valley Days, hosted by Stanley Andrews.

From 1962 to 1971, Warde was a member of the cast of the TV Western series The Virginian in the recurring role of Sheriff Brannon. Warde also appeared on The Big Valley in 1967 as a politician who is murdered in the episode entitled "Night Of The Executioner". He portrayed Simon Winkler in "Opie and the Spoiled Kid" (1963), and Mr. Williams in "Fife, Realtor" in 2 episodes of The Andy Griffith Show. Warde's last role was in the 1979 Rockford Files episode "A Different Drummer" playing the aging father of a shady doctor.

In 1969, Warde was one of a group of actors who made training videos for future doctors. A professor of neurology coached the actors on displaying symptoms of neurological diseases.

== Death ==
Warde died in 1980. He was buried in Los Angeles National Cemetery.

== Filmography ==
- 1941: I Wanted Wings – Montgomery – Co-Pilot (uncredited)
- 1946: O.S.S. – Trainee (uncredited)
- 1947: Buck Privates Come Home – Sergeant – Medic #6 (uncredited)
- 1947: It Had to Be You – Atherton Huntley III (uncredited)
- 1948: To the Ends of the Earth – Harry Hardt (uncredited)
- 1948: Money Madness – Donald Harper
- 1948: On an Island with You – Lieutenant Commander (uncredited)
- 1948: Lady at Midnight – Ross Atherton
- 1948: Night Wind – Colonel (uncredited)
- 1948: Sons of Adventure – Art – Casting Director (uncredited)
- 1948: The Countess of Monte Cristo – Student (uncredited)
- 1948: He Walked by Night – Police Operator 27 (uncredited)
- 1948: Command Decision – Control Officer (uncredited)
- 1948: Wake of the Red Witch – Seaman Handling Diving Line (uncredited)
- 1949: State Department: File 649 – Rev. Dr. Morse
- 1949: Flaxy Martin – McCLane, Assistant District Attorney (uncredited)
- 1949: The Undercover Man – Hoodlum (uncredited)
- 1949: Homicide – Monday Night's bartender (uncredited)
- 1949: Johnny Allegro – Coast Guard Officer (uncredited)
- 1949: The Fountainhead – Young man (uncredited)
- 1949: It's a Great Feeling – Publicity man (uncredited)
- 1949: Task Force – Timmy Kissell
- 1949: The Doctor and the Girl – Anesthetist (uncredited)
- 1949: Prison Warden – Albert Gardner
- 1949: Tokyo Joe – Lieutenant at airport (uncredited)
- 1949: Tell It to the Judge – Joe, Pete's Associate (uncredited)
- 1950: When Willie Comes Marching Home – Captain S. Robbins (uncredited)
- 1950: No Sad Songs for Me – Lee Corbett (uncredited)
- 1950: Customs Agent – Agent Perry (uncredited)
- 1950: Caged – Dr. Ashton (uncredited)
- 1950: The Asphalt Jungle – Reporter (uncredited)
- 1950: The Magnificent Yankee – Norton, Secretary (uncredited)
- 1950: David Harding, Counterspy – Hopkins (uncredited)
- 1950: The Flying Missile – Lieutenant Commander (uncredited)
- 1950: The Man Who Cheated Himself – Howard Frazer
- 1951: Operation Pacific – Dick (admiral's aide) (uncredited)
- 1951: Three Guys Named Mike – Meteorologist Hawkins (uncredited)
- 1951: Up Front – Lt. Myers (uncredited)
- 1951: I Was a Communist for the FBI – FBI Agent (uncredited)
- 1951: Her First Romance – Paul Powers
- 1951: Smuggler's Gold – George Brewster
- 1951: Criminal Lawyer – Byron Claymore (uncredited)
- 1951: Flying Leathernecks – Admiral's aide (uncredited)
- 1951: The Day the Earth Stood Still – Carson (uncredited)
- 1951: Close to My Heart – Father in Car (uncredited)
- 1952: Boots Malone – Private Investigator (uncredited)
- 1952: Loan Shark – Police Lt. White (uncredited)
- 1952: Without Warning! – Police Detective Sgt. Don Warde
- 1952: The Sniper – Mr. Harper (uncredited)
- 1952: Flat Top – Executive Officer (uncredited)
- 1952: Operation Secret – Major Dawson
- 1952: Above and Beyond – Chaplain Downey
- 1953: The Juggler – Shaul, Police Official (uncredited)
- 1953: Vice Squad – Det. Lacey
- 1953: Donovan's Brain – Treasury Agent Brooke
- 1954: Hell and High Water – Photographer (uncredited)
- 1954: Dragnet – Doctor (uncredited)
- 1954: Down Three Dark Streets – FBI Agent Greg Barker
- 1954: Athena – TV show director (uncredited)
- 1955: Strategic Air Command – Duty Officer (uncredited)
- 1955: The Scarlet Coat – Captain with Col. Jameson (uncredited)
- 1955: I'll Cry Tomorrow – Stage Manager (uncredited)
- 1956: A Cry in the Night – Police Sgt. Vic Ogilvie (uncredited)
- 1956: Julie – Det. Pope
- 1957: The Wings of Eagles – Executive Officer (uncredited)
- 1957: Last of the Badmen – Green
- 1957: The Wings of Eagles – Executive Officer
- 1957: The Spirit of St. Louis – Boedecker (uncredited)
- 1957: The Monster That Challenged the World – Lt. Robert 'Clem' Clemens
- 1957: Beau James – Reporter (uncredited)
- 1957: Chicago Confidential – Lt. Traynor (uncredited)
- 1957: Bombardier B-52 (Bombers B-52) – Colonel John Baker, Head of Search and Rescue (uncredited)
- 1957: Sayonara – Consul (uncredited)
- 1958: Cry Terror! – Bert, Operative
- 1958: Hot Spell – Harry
- 1958: The Decks Ran Red – Vic
- 1958: The Buccaneer – Naval Aide to Patterson
- 1959: It Started with a Kiss – Air Force Major (uncredited)
- 1959: The Gazebo – Dr. Bradley, Elliott's Physician (uncredited)
- 1959–1961: Sea Hunt (TV Series) – USCG Cmdr. Ben White / Jonas White
- 1961: Cry for Happy – Chaplain
- 1962: A Public Affair – Herbert
- 1962: The Horizontal Lieutenant – Doctor (uncredited)
- 1962: Incident in an Alley – Ed, Assistant District Attorney (uncredited)
- 1962: Leave It to Beaver (TV Series) – Beaver's 8th grade teacher
- 1962–1972: Bonanza (TV Series) – Solicitor George Osgood / Tom Boyle / Nicholson / District Attorney / Nate Ogleby / Prosecutor Monroe / Constable
- 1963: Papa's Delicate Condition – Rev. Elkins (uncredited)
- 1964: Advance to the Rear – Maj. Hayward (CSA) (uncredited)
- 1964: Good Neighbor Sam – Attorney (uncredited)
- 1964: See How They Run (TV Movie) – Manley
- 1965: Zebra in the Kitchen – Uncle Travis (uncredited)
- 1965: Billie – Doctor Hall
- 1966: Incident at Phantom Hill – Minor Role (uncredited)
- 1966: Boy, Did I Get a Wrong Number! – Newscaster (uncredited)
- 1967: The Ride to Hangman's Tree – Brown (uncredited)
- 1969: Dragnet 1966 (TV Movie) – Officer Wilkins
- 1969: Hook, Line & Sinker – District Attorney (uncredited)
- 1970: Daniel Boone – Nicholas Burns
- 1970: Tora! Tora! Tora! – Brig. Gen. Leonard T. Gerow (uncredited)
- 1970: The Aquarians (TV Movie) – Second Reporter
- 1971: Columbo (TV Series) – Paul Williams
- 1975: Isis (TV Series) – Zoo Keeper
- 1978: Corvette Summer – Las Vegas Police Lieutenant
