= The Bad and the Beautiful =

1952 film directed by Vincente Minnelli

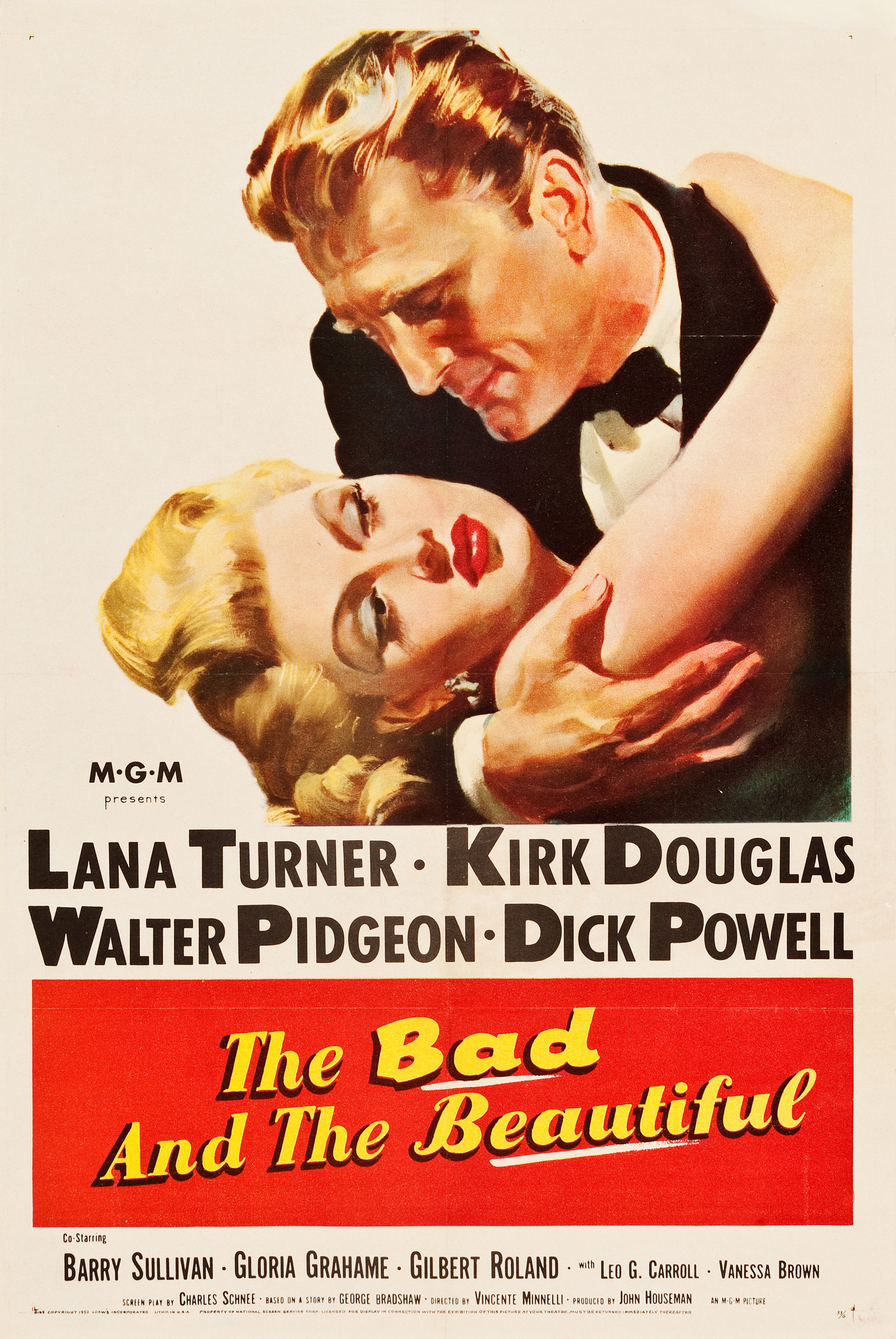
- Theatrical release poster
- Directed by: Vincente Minnelli
- Screenplay by: Charles Schnee
- Based on: "Of Good and Evil"; 1948 story in Cosmopolitan by George Bradshaw
- Produced by: John Houseman
- Starring: Lana Turner; Kirk Douglas; Walter Pidgeon; Dick Powell; Barry Sullivan; Gloria Grahame; Gilbert Roland; Leo G. Carroll; Vanessa Brown
- Cinematography: Robert L. Surtees
- Edited by: Conrad A. Nervig
- Music by: David Raksin
- Production company: Metro-Goldwyn-Mayer
- Distributed by: Loew's Inc.
- Release dates: December 25, 1952 (Los Angeles); January 15, 1953 (New York)
- Running time: 118 minutes
- Country: United States
- Language: English
- Budget: $1,558,000
- Box office: $3,373,000

The Bad and the Beautiful is a 1952 American melodrama film that tells the story of a film producer who alienates everyone around him. The film was directed by Vincente Minnelli, written by George Bradshaw and Charles Schnee and stars Lana Turner, Kirk Douglas, Walter Pidgeon, Dick Powell, Barry Sullivan, Gloria Grahame and Gilbert Roland.

The Bad and the Beautiful won five Academy Awards (including Grahame as Best Supporting Actress) of six nominations in 1952, a record for the most awards for a film not nominated for Best Picture or for Best Director.

In 2002, the United States Library of Congress deemed the film "culturally significant" and selected it for preservation in the National Film Registry.

== Plot ==
In Hollywood, director Fred Amiel, movie star Georgia Lorrison and screenwriter James Lee Bartlow each refuse to speak by phone to Jonathan Shields in Paris. Film producer Harry Pebbel gathers them in his office and explains that Shields has a new film idea and that he wants the three of them for the project. Shields cannot procure financing on his own, but with their names attached, there would be no problem. Pebbel asks them to speak with Shields on the phone before they provide their final answer.

As they await Shields' call, Pebbel assures them that he understands why they had refused to speak to Shields. Their involvement with Shields unfolds in a series of flashbacks. Shields is the son of a notorious former studio head who had been dumped by the industry. The elder Shields was so unpopular that his son hired extras to attend his funeral. However, the younger Shields is determined to attain success in Hollywood.

Shields partners with aspiring director Fred Amiel. Shields intentionally loses money in a poker game to Pebbel so that he can persuade Pebbel to permit him to pay the debt by working as a line producer. Shields and Amiel learn their trades by creating B films for Pebbel. When one film becomes a hit, Shields pitches a more significant project to the studio and is awarded a $1 million budget to produce the film, but he betrays Amiel by allowing someone with an established reputation to direct. The film's success allows Shields to start his own studio, and Pebbel works for him. Amiel becomes an Oscar-winning director.

Shields next encounters the alcoholic Lorrison, the small-time actress daughter of a famous actor whom he had admired. He bolsters her confidence and awards her the leading role in a film over everyone else's objections. When she falls in love with him, he lets her think that he feels the same way so that she does not self-destruct. guaranteeing the performance that he needs. After the premiere makes her a star overnight, she finds him with another woman. Crushed, she abandons her contract and becomes a top Hollywood star at another studio.

Bartlow is a college professor who has written a bestselling book for which Shields has purchased the film rights. Shields wants Bartlow to write the script, and he is persuaded to accept the assignment by his wife Rosemary. They move to Hollywood, where her constant distractions keep him from his work, so Shields asks his suave actor friend Victor "Gaucho" Ribera to keep her occupied. Freed from interruption, Bartlow makes excellent progress on the script. However, Rosemary falls in love with Gaucho and they are killed in a plane crash. Shields asks the distraught Bartlow to help with the production while Shields directs for the first time. He botches the job, which leads to his bankruptcy. When Shields discloses his role in Rosemary's involvement with Gaucho, Bartlow angrily leaves him. Bartlow later writes a novel based upon his wife and wins a Pulitzer Prize.

After each flashback, Pebbel notes that because of Shields, each of the three is now at the top of their profession. At last, Shields's call arrives and Pebbel asks the three people if they will work with Shields just one more time, but all three decline. As they leave, they eavesdrop on an extension phone as Shields describes his new idea, and they become interested.

== Cast ==
- Lana Turner as Georgia Lorrison
- Kirk Douglas as Jonathan Shields
- Walter Pidgeon as Harry Pebbel
- Dick Powell as James Lee Bartlow
- Barry Sullivan as Fred Amiel
- Gloria Grahame as Rosemary Bartlow
- Gilbert Roland as Victor "Gaucho" Ribera
- Leo G. Carroll as Henry Whitfield
- Vanessa Brown as Kay Amiel
- Paul Stewart as Syd
- Sammy White as Gus
- Elaine Stewart as Lila
- Ivan Triesault as Von Ellstein
- Lucy Knoch as Dancer (uncredited)
- Barbara Billingsley as Evelyn Lucien (uncredited)

Louis Calhern is uncredited as the voice of George Lorrison in a recording.

The portraits of Jonathan Shields's father depict Robert F. Simon with an added moustache.

== Production ==
=== Development ===
In 1937, John Houseman joined Orson Welles's Mercury Theatre as an actor. When Welles moved to Hollywood, Houseman collaborated on the screenplay for Citizen Kane (1942). When the United States joined World War II, Houseman spent most of his time supervising the Voice of America (VOA) radio broadcast in Europe. For the remainder of the decade, he directed Broadway plays and produced several Hollywood films, including The Blue Dahlia (1946), Letter from an Unknown Woman (1948), and They Live by Night (1948).

At RKO Radio Pictures, where he produced They Live by Night (1948), Houseman met Dore Schary, the studio's head of production. In May 1948, Howard Hughes acquired a controlling interest in RKO from Floyd Odlum's Atlas Corporation. From thereon, Schary clashed with Hughes's interference, and Schary resigned from RKO in July 1948. Schary next joined Metro-Goldwyn-Mayer (MGM) as their vice president in charge of production.

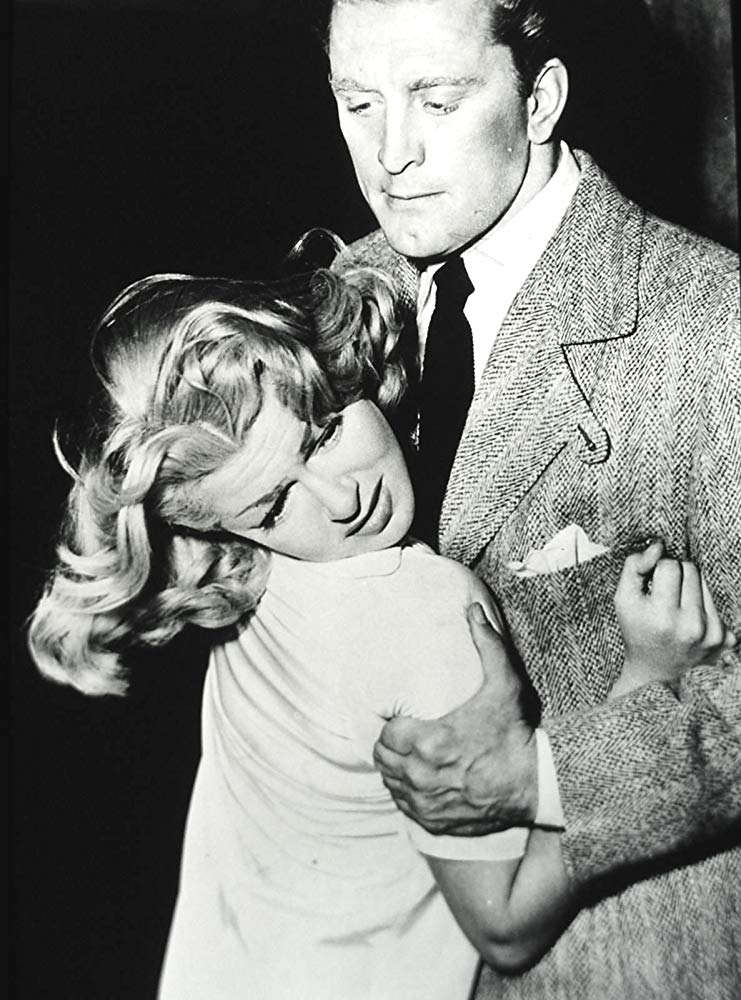
Lana Turner and Kirk Douglas

Meanwhile, Houseman's contract with RKO lapsed. While he next directed a Broadway revival of King Lear in 1950, Schary, now MGM's head of production, signed Houseman to a five-year contract as a film producer. Houseman's first MGM production Holiday for Sinners (1952) was modestly-budgeted compared to other studio productions. When it was released in 1952, Holiday for Sinners received decent reviews from film critics but failed at the box office.

For his second project, Houseman came across a magazine short story "Memorial to a Bad Man" written by George Bradshaw and published in the February 1951 issue of Ladies' Home Journal. The story was expanded from Bradshaw's 1949 magazine story, "Of Good and Evil". Based on the life of Jed Harris, the story occurs after the death of an unscrupulous Broadway producer. The producer's attorney invites three of his former collaborators—a playwright, actor, and stage director—to the funeral, where each one reflects how they were seduced and then betrayed by him. Anticipating their hostile reactions, the dead producer pleads in his final will and testament for them to collaborate on a play in his memory.

Intrigued with the story, Houseman wanted to relocate the story's setting from Broadway to Hollywood as he was tired of theatrical stories with protagonists patterned on Jed Harris. He sent the story to Schary, who readily agreed to produce an adaptation. The screen rights to Bradshaw's 1950 story were purchased for $11,500 (equivalent to $139,705 in 2026). MGM had previously acquired the film rights to Bradshaw's "Of Good and Evil", with Don Hartman assigned as the producer. However, he left for Paramount Pictures and Houseman replaced him.

Schary hired Charles Schnee to write the screenplay based on Houseman's recommendation. Schnee created the character of Jonathan Shields. He and Houseman held story conferences where they decided to cut the flashbacks to three and spread out the story to mirror industry changes in Hollywood over the past decades. They also departed from the story, which had the flashbacks take place during a reading of the producer's will, in which he asks his former collaborators to reunite on one last production in his memory. Instead, they had an actress, film director, and screenwriter reunited by Shields's request that they return to work for him again.

As the script was being revised, Houseman and Schnee recognized the character Jonathan Shields' similarities with real-life film producer David O. Selznick. Houseman wrote in his memoir that he arranged a screening for Selznick's lawyer to determine whether the film contained any libelous material. Selznick's lawyer replied he did not. Schary wrote that Shields was a combination of "David O. Selznick and as yet unknown David Merrick". In his memoir, Vincente Minnelli stated Shields was based on "Selznick and others, the heroine would remind the audience of Diana Barrymore. The director of the cat people film and other small budget pictures would be patterned on Val Lewton."

Impressed with Vincente Minnelli's films such as Father of the Bride (1950) and An American in Paris (1951), Houseman wanted him to direct the film. Minnelli recalled at the time: "The studio wanted me to direct Lili but I didn't want to follow An American in Paris with another ballet film." Houseman invited Minnelli for a lunch meeting at the Romanoff's, where he handed Minnelli the first draft of the script, tentatively titled Tribute to a Bad Man. Minnelli read it and the next day, he agreed to direct.

=== Casting ===
Several of MGM's contract actors were considered for the roles in the film. For the role of Jonathan Shields, Robert Taylor and Clark Gable were suggested. Houseman felt Gable was too old for the role and sent a copy of the script to Kirk Douglas. According to Douglas, Gable turned down the role. He then read the script, found it "wonderful", and was cast in the part.

Houseman, Minnelli, and Schnee each wanted Lana Turner for the role of Georgia Lorrison. Minnelli reflected years later: "Lana liked the script too. Everyone at MGM always wanted to work with Lana. I had been told she wasn't a good actress but I discovered it wasn't true. I found she had great imagination." On January 28, 1952, the casting of Turner and Douglas was announced in the press. Hollywood columnist Louella Parsons published it was "certainly the most unexpected and hottest teaming of 1952 (so far)".

Barry Sullivan was originally cast as James Lee Bartlow, a novelist turned screenwriter, while Dick Powell was cast as Fred Amiel, the director. However, Powell suggested Minnelli to instead cast him as Bartlow, as he looked like a writer. Minnelli agreed, and he and Houseman reassigned Sullivan as Fred Amiel. Walter Pidgeon wanted the role of Harry Pebbel, the studio's B-movie producer. However, he told Houseman and Minnelli that his suave onscreen persona would be ill-suited for the role. One day, he walked into Minnelli's studio office wearing a crew cut wig and an ill-fitted suit to demonstrate how he would appear in the film. Minnelli felt convinced and was cast in the role.

Gilbert Roland was cast as Victor "Gaucho" Ribera while Gloria Grahame was selected for Rosemary Bartlow. Grahame was a close friend and neighbor of Houseman, as they previously met at RKO where she was married to Nicholas Ray.

Elaine Stewart was cast as Lila, Shields's mistress. She previously worked as a cover model, in which she won the title of "Miss See" for See Magazine. Hal Wallis placed her on contract with Paramount Pictures, where she played a nurse in Sailor Beware (1952), a comedy with Dean Martin and Jerry Lewis. Dissatified with the role, Stewart was released from her contract and signed with MGM on the basis of a screen test for Warner Bros.

=== Filming ===
Principal photography began on April 9, 1952.

As the film was in production, MGM feared the title Tribute to a Bad Man would be mistaken for a Western. MGM's head of publicity Howard Dietz suggested The Bad and the Beautiful, which he owed to F. Scott Fitzgerald's 1922 novel The Beautiful and Damned. Schary and MGM's publicity department liked the title, though Houseman and Schnee did not. Houseman sent a memo stating he thought the title was "meaningless, pretentious, and vulgar". He begged Schary to reflect "a year from now" should the film be nominated or win an Academy Award that a "cheap, crummy title" will be read out during the ceremony and before a radio-listening audience. Houseman's memo was overruled, and after a few days, he became accustomed to the new title.

Filming was completed on June 4, 1952.

== Music ==
David Raksin wrote the theme song "The Bad and the Beautiful" (originally titled "Love Is for the Very Young") for the film. Upon first hearing the song, Minnelli and Houseman nearly rejected it, but they were convinced to keep it by Adolph Green and Betty Comden. After the film's release, the song became a hit and a jazz standard, and has been widely covered.

A number of film music experts and composers, including Stephen Sondheim, have highly praised the theme. Critic Michael Phillips wrote: "Its hypnotic way of combining dissonance with resolutions that never quite resolve when, or how, you expect them to, keeps a listener perpetually intrigued. The bittersweet quality proves elusive and addictive. It's perfect for the Douglas character, and for what Minnelli called the Hollywood-insider script's alternately 'affectionate and cynical' air."

== Release ==
Following a sneak preview, an audience rated the film positively but complained that it was too long. In response, Minnelli and Houseman removed 12 minutes of scenes that the audience had found implausible, repetitive or dull. Life magazine published photos from some of the deleted scenes, including a "too obviously fake" beach scene and an anticlimactic helicopter scene. The audience's most common complaint involved the shift from Georgia Lorrison's reckless drive following her rejection by Shields to a scene in which her hair appeared perfectly in place. It was replaced with a transition back to the present in Pebbel's office.

The film premiered in Los Angeles at the United Artists Theatre and Vogue Theatre on Christmas Day 1952 in order to qualify for that year's Academy Awards.

== Reception ==
=== Box office ===
According to MGM records, the film earned $2,367,000 in the U.S. and Canada and $1,006,000 elsewhere, resulting in a profit of $484,000.

=== Critical reaction ===
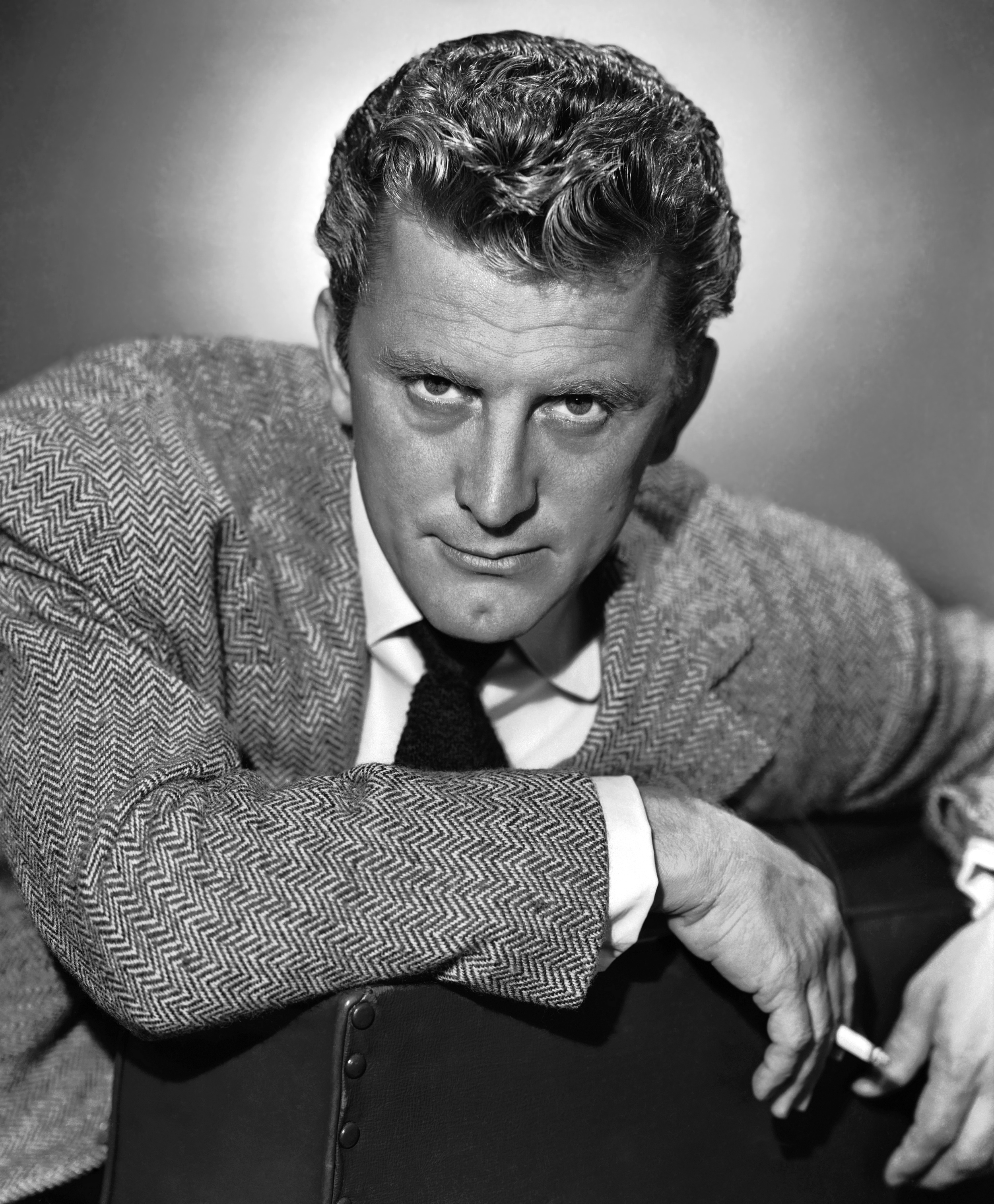
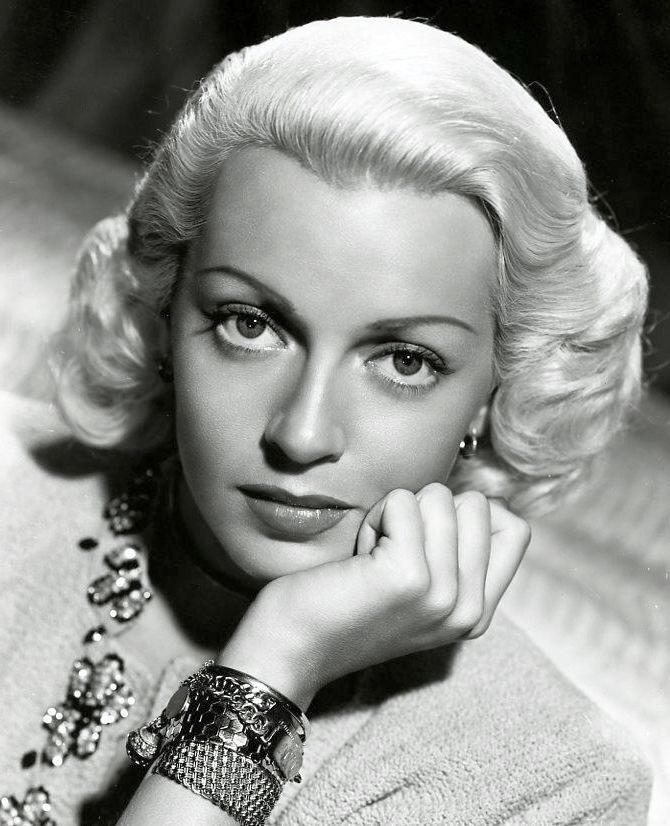
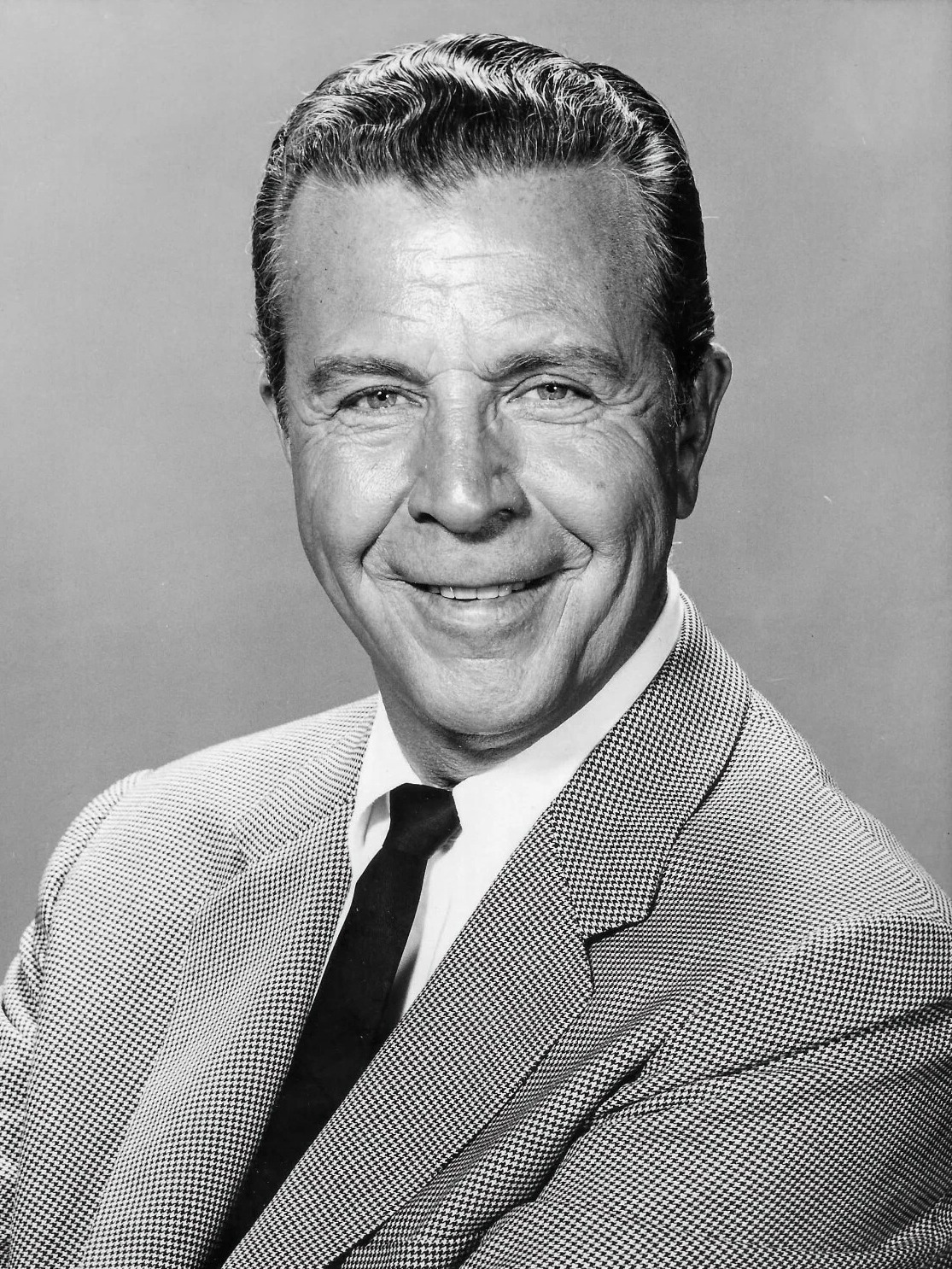
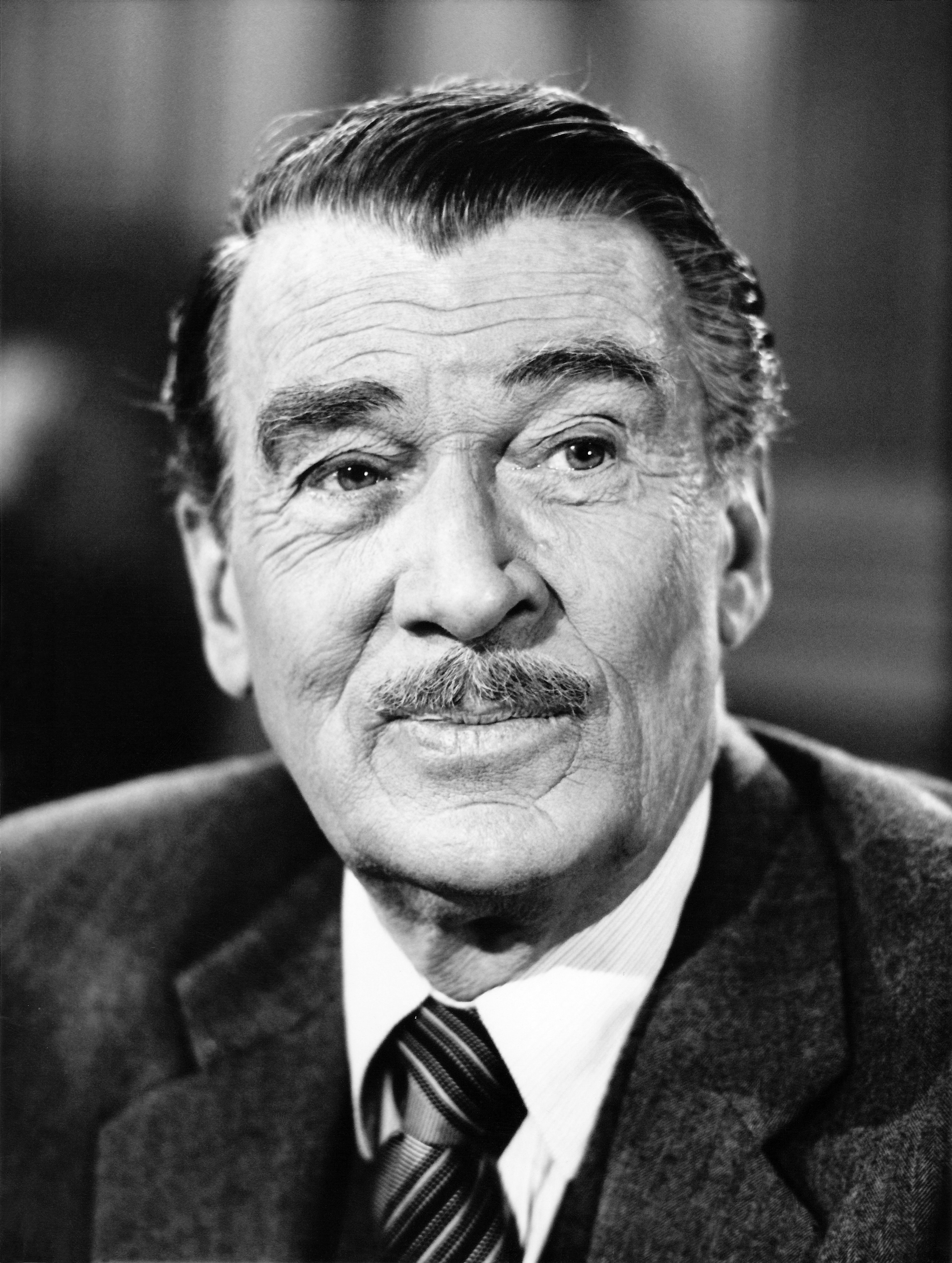
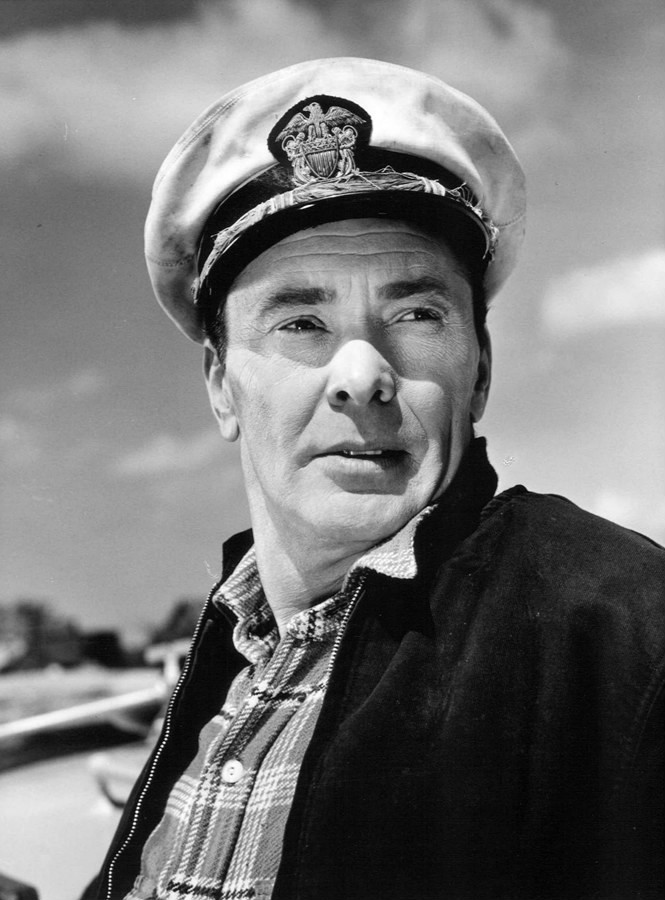
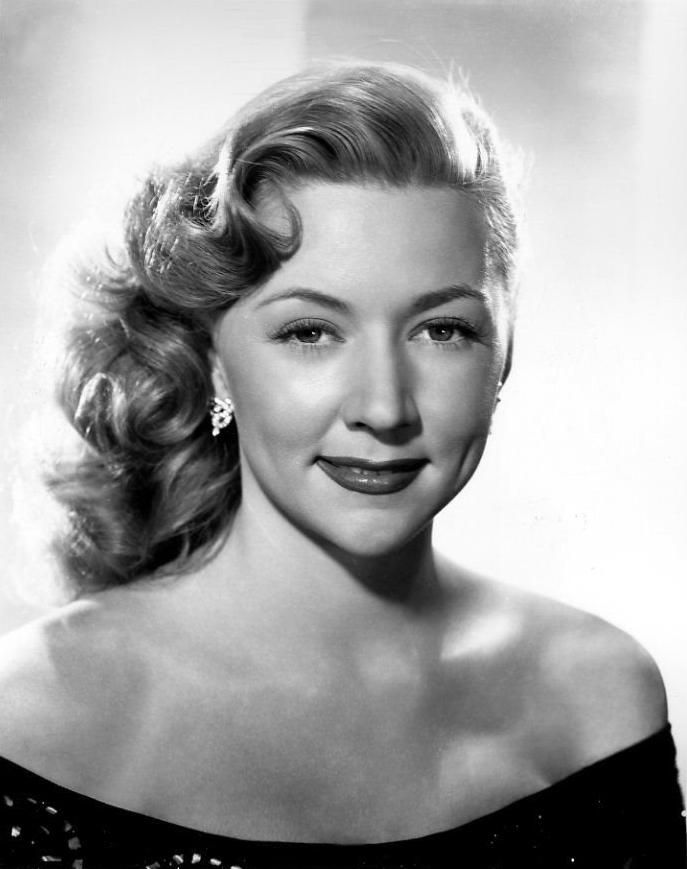
The performances of (top, L–R) Kirk Douglas, Lana Turner, Dick Powell, (bottom, L–R) Walter Pidgeon, Barry Sullivan, and Gloria Grahame in the film were widely praised by critics. Grahame won the Academy Award for Best Supporting Actress.

Bosley Crowther of The New York Times wrote:

[S]omehow, for all this probing and all this intimate looking around amid the realistic paraphernalia and artificial clutter of Hollywood, there does not emerge a clear picture of exactly how movies are made. It is a crowded and colorful picture, but it is choppy, episodic and vague. And what is much more annoying, for all the carving and digging that are done in the producer's insides, it is still not discovered what makes this vicious fellow run. To be sure, Charles Schnee's script makes some effort to explain him as the cynical son of a pioneer movie producer who has died broke and hated in Hollywood. And Kirk Douglas plays the fellow with all that arrogance in the eyes and jaw that suggest a ruthless disposition covering up for a hurt and bitter soul. But this doesn't justify his meanness or his broad inconsistencies. The fellow is a picturesque composite of Hollywood rumor—a prototype of many legends. But that's all he is. He's a cliché. The same might be said of Lana Turner as the incredible girl who is raised from a drunken extra to staggering stardom by the willpower of this man. Frankly, she is no more convincing as the drunken extra than she is as the star. She is an actress playing an actress, and neither one is real. A howling act in a wildly racing auto—pure bunk—is the top of her speed."

Philip K. Scheuer of the Los Angeles Times called the film "one of the three best movies about Hollywood, if not the best." William Brogdon of Variety praised the screenplay as "exceptionally well-written in dialog and situation", Minnelli's direction for making "almost every situation alive with background action and bits of business", and the cast who "each turns in a commanding performance, with [Dick] Powell having a slight edge because of the potent underlaying of his character."

Harrison's Reports wrote: "Thanks to the masterful direction, the fine screenplay, the exceptionally good dialogue and the excellent performances of everyone in the star-studded cast, The Bad and the Beautiful emerges as a first-rate adult drama, with a powerful dramatic impact and a quality that keeps one's eyes riveted to the screen."

== Awards ==
At the 25th Academy Awards, Gloria Grahame's performance as Rosemary Bartlow, which occupied only just nine minutes and 32 seconds of screen time, became the shortest performance to win an Academy Award, a record held until the 49th Academy Awards when Beatrice Straight won Best Supporting Actress for Network (1976) and set a new record of five minutes and two seconds.

Award	Category	Nominee(s)	Result	Ref.
Academy Awards	Best Actor	Kirk Douglas	Nominated	
Academy Awards	Best Supporting Actress	Gloria Grahame	Won	
Academy Awards	Best Screenplay	Charles Schnee	Won	
Academy Awards	Best Art Direction – Black-and-White	Art Direction: Cedric Gibbons and Edward Carfagno; Set Decoration: Edwin B. Willis and F. Keogh Gleason	Won	
Academy Awards	Best Cinematography – Black-and-White	Robert Surtees	Won	
Academy Awards	Best Costume Design – Black-and-White	Helen Rose	Won	
British Academy Film Awards	Best Film from any Source		Nominated	
Directors Guild of America Awards	Outstanding Directorial Achievement in Motion Pictures	Vincente Minnelli	Nominated	
Golden Globe Awards	Best Supporting Actor – Motion Picture	Gilbert Roland	Nominated	
Golden Globe Awards	Best Supporting Actress – Motion Picture	Gloria Grahame	Nominated	
National Board of Review Awards	Top Ten Films		7th Place	
National Film Preservation Board	National Film Registry		Inducted	
Venice International Film Festival	Golden Lion	Vincente Minnelli	Nominated	
Writers Guild of America Awards	Best Written American Drama	Charles Schnee	Nominated	

== Legacy ==
Ten years later, the production team—director Vincente Minnelli, producer John Houseman, screenwriter Charles Schnee, composer David Raksin and star Kirk Douglas—behind The Bad and the Beautiful reunited for another MGM film about the film industry, Two Weeks in Another Town (1962).

During one scene, the character Jack Andrus (portrayed by Douglas) watches a clip from The Bad and the Beautiful inside a screening room. A later scene of Andrus's reckless driving with his ex-wife Carlotta (portrayed by Cyd Charisse) bore similarities to Lana Turner's emotional meltdown inside a moving vehicle. Raksin reused portions of the film's score for Two Weeks in Another Town.

== Home media ==
The Bad and the Beautiful was released as a Region 1 DVD by Warner Home Video on February 5, 2002. It was released on Blu-ray disc by Warner Archive on November 19, 2019.

== Bibliography ==
- Douglas, Kirk (1989). The Ragman's Son: An Autobiography. New York: Pocket Books. ISBN 0-671-63718-5.
- Eames, John Douglas (1975). The MGM Story: The Complete History of Fifty Roaring Years. New York: Crown. ISBN 0517523892.
- Eyman, Scott (2005). Lion of Hollywood: The Life and Legend of Louis B. Mayer. Simon & Schuster. ISBN 0-7432-0481-6.
- Griffin, Mark (2010). A Hundred or More Hidden Things: The Life and Films of Vincente Minnelli. Cambridge, MA: Da Capo Press. ISBN 978-0-7867-2099-6.
- Harvey, Stephen (1989). Directed by Vincente Minnelli. New York: Museum of Modern Art; Harper & Row. ISBN 978-0-87070-474-1.
- Houseman, John (1979). Front and Center: A Memoir. New York: Simon & Schuster. ISBN 978-0-671-41391-0.
- Levy, Emmanuel (2009). Vincente Minnelli: Hollywood's Dark Dreamer. New York: St. Martins Press. ISBN 978-0-312-32925-9.
- Minnelli, Vincente; Arce, Hector (1974). I Remember it Well. Garden City: Doubleday. ISBN 0-385-09522-8.
- Morella, Joe; Epstein, Edward Z. (1971). Lana: The Public and Private Lives of Miss Turner. New York: Citadel Press. ISBN 0-8065-0226-6.
- Schary, Dore (1979). Heyday: An Autobiography. Boston: Little, Brown and Company. ISBN 0-316-77270-4.
