= Frances Rafferty =

American actress (1922-2004)

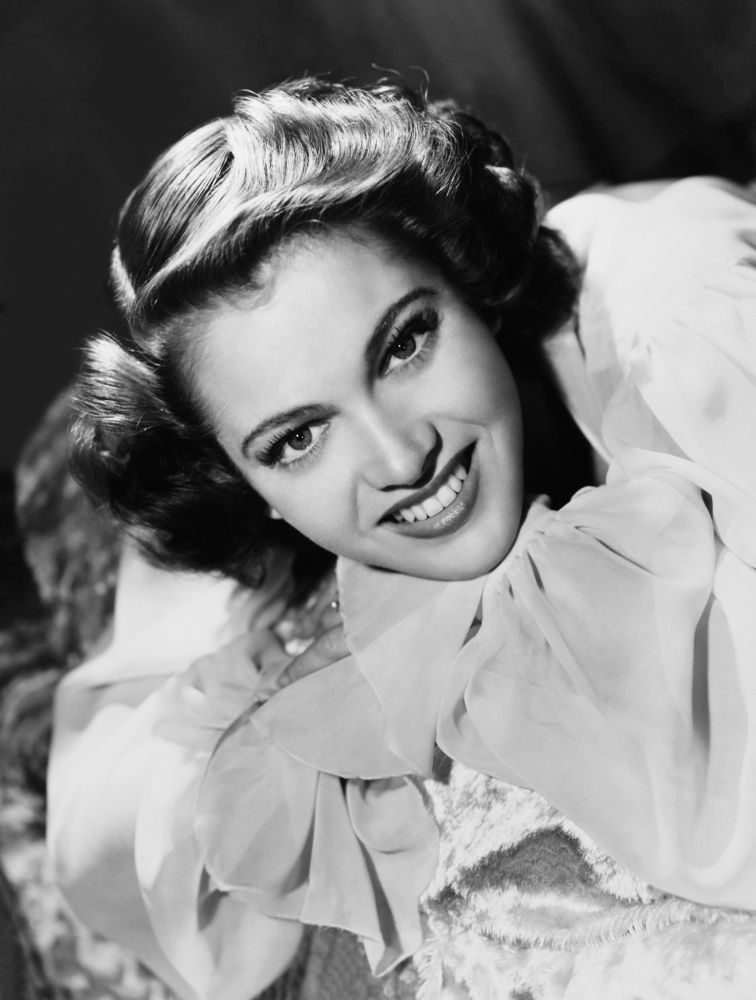
- Rafferty in the 1940s
- Born: Frances Anne Rafferty; June 16, 1922; Sioux City, Iowa, U.S.
- Died: April 18, 2004 (aged 81); Paso Robles, California, U.S.
- Occupations: Actress, dancer
- Years active: 1942–1977
- Spouses: John Horton (m. 1944; div. 1947) Thomas R. Baker (m. 1948)
- Children: 2
- Relatives: Max Rafferty (brother)

Frances Anne Rafferty (June 16, 1922 – April 18, 2004) was an American actress, dancer, World War II pin-up girl and Metro-Goldwyn-Mayer contract player.

== Early life ==
Frances Anne Rafferty was born in Sioux City, Iowa, the daughter of Maxwell Lewis Rafferty and DeEtta Frances (née Cox) Rafferty. She was the younger sister of California educator and Republican politician Max Rafferty, whose wife was Frances (nee Longman) Rafferty.

At 1931, At the age of nine she moved with her family to Los Angeles. At a young age, she studied dancing, and her physical attributes and dancing skills led to work in the film industry.

Rafferty attended Miss Bryant's Day School and Bryant School while the family lived in Iowa. After moving to California, she graduated from University High School in Los Angeles.

== Career ==
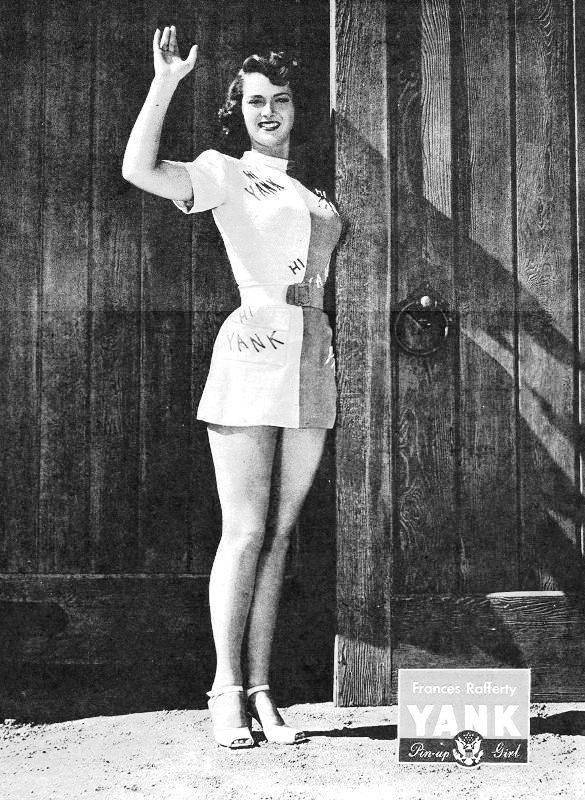
Pin-up photo of Rafferty for Yank, the Army Weekly in 1945

Signed by MGM Studios, Rafferty made her film debut in 1942. She appeared in minor and secondary roles, and although she had a part in the 1944 film Dragon Seed with Katharine Hepburn and Walter Huston, her significant parts were limited almost exclusively to "B" movies. She played the female lead in "The Hidden Eyes"(1945). For instance, in 1948, she starred with Hugh Beaumont in the film noir Money Madness, directed by Sam Newfield. Her only role in a major film was in Bud Abbott and Lou Costello in Hollywood (1945).

During World War II, she was a volunteer pin-up girl for YANK magazine, a publication for the soldiers of the United States military.

In 1949, Rafferty was a performer on the anthology series Oboler Comedy Theater on ABC television.

From 1954 to 1959, she appeared as Ruth Ruskin Henshaw in all 156 episodes of the Desilu Studios sitcom December Bride on CBS. When fellow cast member Harry Morgan and actress Cara Williams starred in the 1960-62 December Bride spin off sitcom, Pete and Gladys, Rafferty was subsequently cast in seven episodes in the role of "Nancy".

Rafferty appeared in a number of different television programs throughout the 1950s and 1960s. Among them were two guest appearances on Perry Mason. She portrayed Heather Marlow in "Never Look Back", the Season 4, Episode 18, installment of My Three Sons in 1964.

After her retirement from acting in 1965, she made a final appearance in a 1977 episode of the crime drama The Streets of San Francisco.

== Personal life ==
She was married to her first husband from 1944 until their divorce in 1947. (Rafferty's biography on The Des Moines Register's DataCentral site gives Rafferty's first husband's name as "Maj. John Horton". An Associated Press news story dated February 18, 1947, reported "Movie Actress Frances Rafferty obtained a divorce today from John E. Horton, former army major.")

== Death ==
Rafferty died in 2004 in Paso Robles, California.

== Filmography ==
Year	Title	Role	Notes
1942	Fingers at the Window	Clinic Switchboard Operator	Uncredited
1942	The War Against Mrs. Hadley	Sally	
1942	Seven Sweethearts	George Van Maaster	
1943	Slightly Dangerous	Girl Getting Off Bus	Uncredited
1943	Presenting Lily Mars	Showgirl	Uncredited
1943	Dr. Gillespie's Criminal Case	Irene	
1943	Hitler's Madman	Annaliese Cermak	Uncredited
1943	Pilot No. 5	Carhop	Uncredited
1943	Young Ideas	Co-Ed	
1943	Swing Shift Maisie	Office Worker	Uncredited
1943	Thousands Cheer	Marie Corbino	
1943	Girl Crazy	Marjorie Tait	
1944	Broadway Rhythm	Autograph Seeker	Uncredited
1944	Dragon Seed	Orchid Tan - Lao Ta's Wife	
1944	Barbary Coast Gent	Portia Adair	
1944	Mrs. Parkington	Jane Stilham	
1945	The Hidden Eye	Jean Hampton	
1945	Abbott and Costello in Hollywood	Claire Warren	
1946	Bad Bascomb	Dora McCabe	
1947	Lost Honeymoon	Lois Evans	
1947	The Adventures of Don Coyote	Maggie Riley	
1947	Curley	Mildred Johnson	
1947	The Hal Roach Comedy Carnival	Schoolteacher Mildred Johnson, in 'Curly'	
1948	Money Madness	Julie Saunders	
1948	Lady at Midnight	Ellen McPhail Wiggins	
1949	An Old-Fashioned Girl	Frances Shaw	
1952	Rodeo	Dixie Benson	
1953	Your Jeweler's Showcase	Julie Elson	Episode: "Christmas Is Magic"
1954	The Shanghai Story	Mrs. Warren	
1956	G.E. Summer Originals		Episode: "The Unwilling Witness"
1961	Wings of Chance	Arlene Baker	
