= Charles Schnee =

American screenwriter (1916–1962)

Charles Schnee (6 August 1916 Bridgeport, Connecticut – 29 November 1962 Beverly Hills, California) was an American screenwriter and film producer. He wrote the scripts for the Westerns Red River (1948) and The Furies (1950), the social melodrama They Live by Night (1949), and the cynical Hollywood saga The Bad and the Beautiful (1952), for which he won an Academy Award.

He worked primarily as a film producer and production executive during the mid-1950s (credits include Until They Sail), but he eventually turned his attention back to scriptwriting.

== Biography ==
He was born in Bridgeport, Connecticut and graduated from Yale in 1936. He studied law for the next three years and practised law in Massachusetts. He was writing plays and a play Apology had a run in 1943 with Elissa Landi.

=== Screenwriter ===
Schnee came to Hollywood in 1945. He did some writing on From This Day Forward (1946) at RKO and was credited on Cross My Heart (1946) for Paramount. He sold Angel Face to Paramount for $25,000 and stayed at Paramount to write I Walk Alone (1947) for Hal B. Wallis which was a success and really helped establish him.

Schnee returned to RKO, then under head Dore Schary, and worked with director Nicholas Ray and producer John Houseman on They Live by Night (1948). Howard Hawks hired him to work on the script for Red River (1948), which became established as a classic.

He did some uncredited writing for Hal B. Wallis on The Accused (1949), and he wrote Easy Living (1949) at RKO.

=== MGM ===
Schary joined MGM and Schnee followed, working on Scene of the Crime (1949). He wrote Paid in Full (1950) for Wallis, then did Schary's personal production, The Next Voice You Hear... (1950) at MGM.

Schnee wrote The Furies (1950) for Hal B. Wallis, and Born to Be Bad (1950) for Nicholas Ray at RKO.

At MGM he wrote Right Cross (1950) and Bannerline (1951), then did another Schary personal production, Westward the Women (1952).

Schnee wrote a comedy, When in Rome (1952) which was a flop then did The Bad and the Beautiful (1952) for Houseman and director Vincente Minnelli which was a critical and commercial success. Schnee won an Oscar for this script and Schary promoted him to producer.

=== Producer at MGM ===
In January 1952, Dore Schary of MGM announced the formation of a new production unit under the supervision of Charles Schnee. The idea was to make ten to fifteen films a year with budgets under $500,000 to absorb studio overhead.

The unit included several sons of executives who had helped establish MGM, Matthew Raft (son of Harry Rapf), Arthur Loew (son of Marcus Loew), and Sidney Franklin Jnr (son of Sidney Franklin). Other producers were Hayes Goetz, Henry Berman (brother of Pandro S. Berman) and Sol Fielding.

Schnee was the uncredited producer on Rogue's March (1952) with Peter Lawford, which lost money, and Jeopardy (1953), which earned MGM a profit. He produced a Joan Crawford vehicle, Torch Song (1953),

In September 1953, his unit was disbanded and he was assigned producer on Bad Day at Black Rock but the production ceased in November. He next made a Biblical movie, The Prodigal (1955) which was a fiasco.

Schnee enjoyed more success with Trial (1955) starring Glenn Ford and especially Somebody Up There Likes Me (1956) with Paul Newman and Rocky Graziano, both popular movies that were critically acclaimed.

Schnee produced The Wings of Eagles (1957), a biopic of Spig Wead starring John Wayne directed by John Ford. He produced a crime film, House of Numbers (1957) and Until They Sail (1957), the latter reuniting him with the star and director of Somebody Up There Likes Me. He produced Party Girl (1958) for Nicholas Ray at MGM.

=== Attempt at producing ===
He left MGM and setup as an independent producer at Columbia. He announced Company of Cowards with Hugh O'Brian, an adaptation of The Tiger Among Us by Leigh Brackett and was going to do an original screenplay Atom and Eva. He was also going to make The Image Makers with Clark Gable. None of the films were made apart from Tiger which would be produced by others years later as 13 West Street. Schnee returned to screenwriting.

=== Return to screenwriting and death ===
He wrote The Mark Hellinger Story for George Sidney but the film did not proceed due to casting issues. He wrote The Crowded Sky (1960) at Warners and a significant success with BUtterfield 8 (1961) at MGM. In 1961 he was president of the Writers Guild of America, West.

As "John Dennis" he wrote By Love Possessed (1961). Then he was reunited with the star, producer and director of The Bad and the Beautiful with Two Weeks in Another Town (1962), a critical and commercial disappointment. Following his work on Two Weeks in Another Town, Kirk Douglas hired him to rewrite The List of Adrian Messenger (1963).

His wife, Mary Schnee, predeceased him by committing suicide in October 1961.

Schnee had just signed a contract with Dino De Laurentiis on the Sacco and Vanzetti case when he died of a heart attack on November 29, 1962. He was 46, survived by a 14-year-old daughter, Tina.
