= David Raksin =

American composer (1912–2004)

- Born: August 4, 1912; Philadelphia, Pennsylvania, U.S.
- Died: August 9, 2004 (aged 92); Los Angeles, California, U.S.
- Education: University of Pennsylvania
- Occupation: Film composer
- Years active: 1936–2004
- Notable work: Laura (1944)

David Raksin (August 4, 1912 – August 9, 2004) was an American composer noted for his work in film and television. Raksin had more than 100 film scores and 300 television scores to his credit. Some sources called him the "Grandfather of Film Music".

== Early life and education ==
Trailer for Laura

David Raksin was born in Philadelphia, Pennsylvania, United States, to Jewish parents of Russian heritage. His father was an orchestra conductor. Raksin played professionally in dance bands while attending Central High School of Philadelphia. He went on to study composition with Harl McDonald at the University of Pennsylvania, and later with Isadore Freed in New York and Arnold Schoenberg in Los Angeles. In New York, Raksin worked as an arranger for Harms/Chappell.

== Career ==
One of his earliest film assignments was as assistant to Charlie Chaplin in the composition of the score for Modern Times (1936). He is perhaps best remembered for his score for Laura (1944). The theme music for "Laura", with lyrics by Johnny Mercer, became a major hit. During Raksin's lifetime, "Laura" was reportedly the second most-recorded song in history after "Stardust" by Hoagy Carmichael and Mitchell Parish.

Raksin's theme song, "The Bad and the Beautiful" (also called "Love is For the Very Young") for the 1953 film The Bad and the Beautiful (1953) was also a hit, although not as popular as "Laura". Raksin insisted that the song be released as an instrumental, because he had resented having to split the proceeds from "Laura" with a lyricist. Raksin's theme for "The Bad and the Beautiful" was initially disliked by the film's director Vincente Minnelli and producer John Houseman, but was saved from rejection by the intervention of Adolph Green and Betty Comden, who both liked it. The theme has since been praised by Stephen Sondheim, Leonard Rosenman, Richard Rodney Bennett, and Alexander Courage. Sondheim reportedly called it "one of the best themes ever written in films."

Raksin also scored the 1958 film Separate Tables, for which he earned an Academy Award nomination.

In the 1960s, Raksin wrote the theme for (and scored the pilot of) the medical drama television series Ben Casey. Later in life, Raksin taught at the University of Southern California and the University of California, Los Angeles.

== Personal life ==
Raksin married twice. He had a daughter with his first wife and a son with his second.

== Death and legacy ==
Raksin died on August 9, 2004 in Los Angeles. At the time of his death, it was announced that Raksin had completed his autobiography, titled If I Say So Myself. The book was eventually published under the title The Bad and the Beautiful: My Life in a Golden Age of Film Music.

In 2012, he was named for a Lifetime Achievement Award for a Past Film Composer.

His son Alex is a Pulitzer Prize-winning editorial writer for the Los Angeles Times.

== Select film and TV scores ==
- The Day After (1983)
- The Ghost of Flight 401 (1978)
- Glass Houses (1972)
- What's the Matter with Helen? (1971)
- The Over-the-Hill Gang Rides Again (1970)
- Will Penny (1968)
- A Big Hand for the Little Lady (1966)
- Love Has Many Faces (1965)
- Sylvia (1965)
- Invitation to a Gunfighter (1964)
- The Patsy (1964)
- Two Weeks in Another Town (1962)
- Too Late Blues (1961)
- Night Tide (1961)
- Pay or Die (1960)
- Al Capone (1959)
- Separate Tables (1958)
- Twilight for the Gods (1958)
- Until They Sail (1957)
- Gunsight Ridge (1957)
- Man on Fire (1957)
- The Vintage (1957)
- Bigger Than Life (1956)
- Hilda Crane (1956)
- Jubal (1956)
- Seven Wonders of the World (1955) (with Sol Kaplan, Jerome Moross, Emil Newman)
- The Big Combo (1955)
- Suddenly (1954)
- Apache (1954)
- The Unicorn in the Garden (1953)
- The Bad and the Beautiful (1952)
- Madeline (cartoon) (1952)
- Carrie (1952)
- Pat and Mike (1952)
- The Man with a Cloak (1951)
- Across the Wide Missouri (1951)
- Kind Lady (1951)
- The Next Voice You Hear... (1950)
- The Magnificent Yankee (1950)
- Whirlpool (1950)
- Force of Evil (1948)
- Apartment for Peggy (1948)
- Fury at Furnace Creek (1948)
- Daisy Kenyon (1947)
- Forever Amber (1947)
- The Secret Life of Walter Mitty (1947)
- Smoky (1946)
- Fallen Angel (1945)
- Laura (1944)
- Tampico (1944)
- City Without Men (1943)
- The Men in Her Life (1941)
- The Adventures of Sherlock Holmes (1939)
- Stanley and Livingstone (1939)
- The Hound of the Baskervilles (1939)
- Modern Times (arranger) (1936)

== Work on Broadway ==
- Thumbs Up! (1934) - revue - co-orchestrator
- Parade (1935) - revue - co-orchestrator
- At Home Abroad (1935) - revue - co-orchestrator
- New Faces of 1936 (1936) - revue - co-orchestrator
- If the Shoe Fits (1946) - musical - composer
- Dream (1997) - revue - featured songwriter for "Laura"

== See also ==
- The Film Music Society
