= Fred Kohlmar =

American film producer

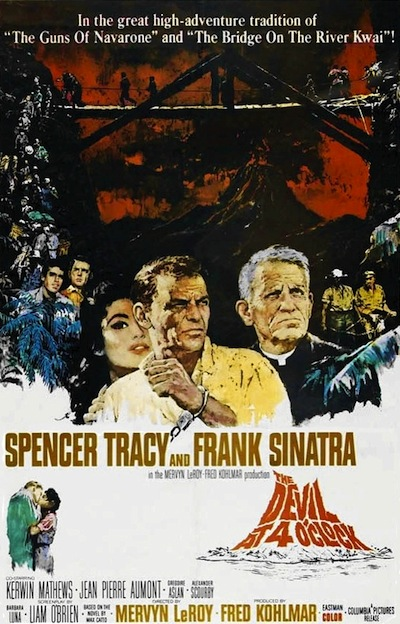
The Devil at 4 O'Clock poster.jpg

Fred Kohlmar (August 10, 1905 - October 13, 1969) was a New York City-born film producer. The former agent worked as an executive assistant to Samuel Goldwyn before becoming a producer in the 1930s. He worked for 20th Century Fox, Paramount Pictures, and Columbia Pictures. Lee Kohlmar was his father.

== Selected filmography ==
- The Lone Wolf Strikes (1940)
- The Lady Has Plans (1942)
- Take a Letter, Darling (1942)
- The Dark Corner (1946)
- Kiss of Death (1947)
- The Ghost and Mrs. Muir (1947)
- My Sister Eileen (1955)
- Picnic (1955)
- Pal Joey
- The Wackiest Ship in the Army (1960)
- Bye Bye Birdie (1963)
- How to Steal a Million (1966)
