= Sixth Happiness =

1997 film by Waris Hussein

- Directed by: Waris Hussein
- Written by: Firdaus Kanga
- Based on: Trying to Grow by Firdaus Kanga
- Produced by: Tatiana Kennedy
- Starring: Firdaus Kanga; Souad Faress; Khodus Wadia; Nina Wadia; Ahsen Bhatti
- Cinematography: James Welland
- Edited by: Laurence Méry-Clark
- Music by: Dominique Le Gendre
- Production companies: Arts Council of England; BBC Films; British Film Institute; Kennedy Mellor
- Distributed by: Regent Releasing; Dreamfactory; Mongrel Media here! Films
- Release dates: 4 October 1997 (Mill Valley); 2 October 1998 (London)
- Running time: 97 minutes
- Country: United Kingdom
- Language: English

Sixth Happiness is a 1997 British drama film directed by Indian director Waris Hussein. It is based on the 1991 autobiography of Firdaus Kanga, entitled Trying to Grow. Kanga plays a fictionalized version of himself in the film, which involves themes about Britain, India, race and sex. Sixth Happiness also features performances from Souad Faress, Nina Wadia, Indira Varma, and Meera Syal.

== Plot ==
Sixth Happiness is about Brit, a boy born with brittle bones who never grows taller than four feet, and his sexual awakening as family life crumbles around him. The story begins in the early 1960s in the Parsee community of Mumbai. Parsees, descendants of the Persian empire, settled in western India after escaping an Islamic invasion in Persia in the seventh century. Under the Raj, Parsees had a close relationship with the British. Brit is named by his mother after his brittle bone condition and in tribute to her love of Britain.

Brit's family is non-stereotypical: his parents are ardent Anglophiles with fond memories of the Raj and World War II. While Brit's mother accepts her son unconditionally, his father has a harder time coming to terms with his disability. As Brit matures into adulthood, he becomes aware of his attraction to other men. This is exacerbated with the visit of Cyrus, a handsome young lodger who comes to stay with the Kotwal family.

== Cast ==
- Firdaus Kanga as Brit Kotwal
- Souad Faress as Sera Kotwal
- Khodus Wadia as Sam Kotwal
- Nina Wadia as Dolly Kotwal
- Ahsen Bhatti as Cyrus
- Mahabanoo Mody-Kotwal as Jeroo
- Nisha K. Nayar as Tina
- Indira Varma as Amy
- Pratima Kazmi as Brothel Madam
- Meera Syal as Breathing Generator

== Critical reception ==
David Noh of Film Journal International gave a positive review, writing "What could easily have been a maudlin exercise a la TV-Movie Disease-of-the-Week is lightened throughout by a highly observant comic take on this eccentric, quick-witted family and their even more colorful neighbors." He added, "Veteran director Hussein (The Possession of Joel Delaney, Quackser Fortune Has a Cousin in the Bronx) obviously loves these characters and fully shares that love with the audience. James Welland's rich-hued photography makes the most of both interiors and gorgeous Bombay settings."

Lawrence Van Gelder of The New York Times wrote, "Presented without sentiment, Brit is no angel. He can be manipulative and selfish as well as perceptive and funny. And as Mr. Kanga and Mr. Hussein know, these qualities make him human and very much worth knowing." Time Out was also positive, writing: "This adaptation conveys the book's joie de vivre and most particularly its gloriously non-PC take on the subject. Kanga wrote the screenplay, plays the lead and also does pieces to camera commenting on the action. Astonishingly, he pulls off all three with aplomb, assisted by a strong cast – notably Souad Faress as his mother. Waris Hussein's direction uses some interesting tricks without being tricksy. A witty film: perspicacious and generous in its gaze."

In contrast, Dennis Harvey of Variety gave a critical review in which he said the film's mix of drama and comedy does not cohere. He wrote, "Though story sports plenty of complications, script and direction downplay melodramatic potential and pathos in favor of a quirky, humorously anecdotal approach. Unfortunately, [the filmmakers] seldom carry it off."
