= Ramona Stewart =

American novelist (1922–2006)

- Born: February 19, 1922; San Francisco, California, U.S.
- Died: April 30, 2006 (aged 84); Key West, Florida, U.S.
- Education: University of Southern California
- Occupation: Novelist
- Writing career
- Genres: Romance fiction, supernatural thriller

Ramona Stewart (February 19, 1922 – April 30, 2006) was an American author. She is best known for her 1946 novel Desert Town and the 1970 supernatural thriller The Possession of Joel Delaney, both of which were adapted into films.

== Life and career ==
Stewart was born in San Francisco, California in 1922, the daughter of James Oliver Stewart and Theresa Waugh. She grew up in Los Angeles with her father, a promoter of silver mines. She was of Irish descent. Stewart attended the University of Southern California from 1938 until 1941.

Her first published works were serialized stories for Collier's magazine. The first of them, first published as "Bitter Harvest" from November 24 to December 8, 1945, was quickly optioned by Hollywood producer Hal B. Wallis and became the basis of Desert Fury, a film noir by Lewis Allen starring Lizabeth Scott, John Hodiak, and Burt Lancaster. Stewart later developed the story into her first full-length novel with the title Desert Town.

After this early success, Stewart continued to submit material to Collier's, often coming-of-age stories that were popular in the slicks. She wouldn't publish another novel until 1962, The Stars Abide. This was followed by several other books sharing the themes she had established in her debut: odd love triangles, dysfunctional families, and more or less explicit homosexual relationships. At least one of those books, The Surprise Party Complex, dealing with disenchanted teenagers living in Hollywood, seems to have been turned into a spec script, but no film was produced.

After a detour toward the historical novel with Casey in 1968, Stewart finally settled as an author of thrillers with supernatural elements in the 1970s, starting with The Possession of Joel Delaney, which became her second title to be adapted into a film, directed by Waris Hussein and starring Shirley MacLaine and Perry King.

Stewart's final novel, The Nightmare Candidate, was published in 1980. For much of her adult life she resided with her husband in Key West, Florida, where she died in 2006.

== Reception and impact ==
While Desert Town has been marketed as an early example of pulp fiction, Stewart's early novels in particular have been praised for the depth hidden beneath the raunchy dialogue and the relationships between innocent females and almost clichéd males. Author and poet Sarah Key wrote that Stewart's female characters were "ahead of their time, often outcasts from conventional society, sometimes aided by supernatural forces".

Stewart's work is also noted for its early depictions of homosexual relationships. Noir expert Eddie Muller called Desert Fury, the film adaptation of Desert Town, "the gayest movie ever produced in Hollywood's golden era".

== Bibliography ==
- Desert Town (Morrow, 1947)
- The Stars Abide (Cardinal, 1962)
- The Surprise Party Complex (Morrow, 1963)
- Professor Descending (Heinemann, 1965)
- A Confidence in Magic (Doubleday, 1965)
- Kit Larkin (Doubleday, 1966)
- Casey (Little, Brown, 1968)
- The Possession of Joel Delaney (Little, Brown, 1970)
- The Apparition (Little, Brown, 1973)
- Age of Consent (Dutton, 1975)
- Seasons of the Heart (G.P. Putnam's Sons, 1978)
- Sixth Sense (Delacorte Press, 1979)
- The Nightmare Candidate (Delacorte Press, 1980)
