= The Possession of Joel Delaney =

1970 novel by Ramona Stewart

- First edition cover
- Author: Ramona Stewart
- Language: English
- Genre: Horror
- Publisher: Little, Brown and Company
- Publication place: United States
- Media type: Print (Hardcover, paperback)
- Pages: 240 (first edition)
- OCLC: 464352503

The Possession of Joel Delaney is a 1970 horror novel by American writer Ramona Stewart. Its plot follows a woman who comes to believe her brother has been possessed by the spirit of a serial killer. It was adapted into the 1972 feature film of the same title starring Shirley MacLaine and Perry King.
