= Kaur (film) =

2022 British short film

- Film poster
- Directed by: Kaki Wong
- Produced by: Parvinder Shergill; Juggy Sohal
- Starring: Parvinder Shergill; Nina Wadia; Stephen Uppal
- Release date: 2022
- Running time: 13 min 27 sec
- Country: UK
- Language: English

Kaur is a 2022 British short film co-written and produced by Parvinder Shergill and Juggy Sohal. It depicts a young British Sikh woman who decides to wear a turban against the advice of her father. Her father had been traumatised by his own experience of being a turban-wearing Sikh immigrant in Britain, when in the 1980s he found his own hair had been cut off after an assault after leaving the bus from school.

The film features Shergill as the young woman, Nina Wadia as her mother, and Stephen Uppal as her father. Kaur was first released in 2022 and toured gurudwaras, festivals and university Sikh societies in the UK. Before appearing on Netflix in May 2024, it was broadcast on ITVX and BritBox. Generally seen as a success at the festivals, it was later announced that the film would form the basis of a Hollywood feature film.

== Plot ==
Kaur is centred around Avani, a young British Sikh woman who tells her mother of the difficult decision she has made to commit to the baptism ceremony of Amrit Sanskar; this requires her to keep her head covered with a turban despite her father having long discouraged her from such a public declaration of faith. Three main scenes focus on the conversations she has individually with each parent and then finally on the ceremony. Interspersed are snippets of typical Gurudwara life in the UK, including langar preparation and community gatherings.

Avani is surprised to hear that her maternal grandmother might have disapproved, and that her father is present outside the building. She then confronts him with questions on why he does not approve of her personal choice of wanting to wear a turban. He is clear that he will not support her in a choice that led him to be tormented when he was a child. It was 1984, when he was an immigrant school child coming off a bus. He explains that after feeling a blow to his head, he found his hair had been cut off. He did not want his child to go through what he did.

== Production and release ==
According to British Sikh physician Parvinder Shergill, after Bend It Like Beckham, she could not find another mainstream English film led by a woman who looked like her so she made her own and titled it Kaur. She co-wrote and co-produced it with presenter Juggy Sohal. It was directed by Kaki Wong. More than 70 South Asian women contributed, including Harpreet Kaur.

The film is set in a gurudwara in Bedford. The complete film lasts 13 minutes and 27 seconds. Kaur was first released in 2022 and toured gurudwaras, festivals and university Sikh societies in the UK. In 2023, it was broadcast on ITVX and BritBox. It appeared on Netflix in May 2024.

== Cast ==
- Parvinder Shergill as Avani
- Nina Wadia as Avani's mother
- Stephen Uppal as Avani's father

== Reception and adaptation ==
In 2022, Kaur received a jury mention for Best Short Film and Best Director Short at the Global Indian Film Festival. The Independent's Jacob Stolworthy reported that the film was a success at festivals and has been seen as a "shining a light on Sikh families in the UK". He wrote that the film "has been praised for the thought-provoking way it explores the challenges faced by British South Asian women in the UK, but also for its examination of the reason why Avani's father, a Sikh Punjabi immigrant, responds to her decision in the way he does." Asia Samachar reported that Shergill's intent was to reach out to a wider audience on stories about Asian women. In 2024 the BBC and the Eastern Eye reported that the film would be the basis of a Hollywood feature film.
