= Don't Be Afraid of the Dark (2010 film) =

Supernatural horror film

- Theatrical release poster
- Directed by: Troy Nixey
- Screenplay by: Guillermo del Toro; Matthew Robbins
- Based on: Don't Be Afraid of the Dark by Nigel McKeand
- Produced by: Guillermo del Toro; Mark Johnson; Stephen Jones
- Starring: Katie Holmes; Guy Pearce; Bailee Madison; Jack Thompson
- Cinematography: Oliver Stapleton
- Edited by: Jill Bilcock
- Music by: Marco Beltrami; Buck Sanders
- Production companies: Miramax; Necropia Entertainment; Gran Via Productions
- Distributed by: FilmDistrict (United States); Hopscotch Films (Australia)
- Release dates: November 6, 2010 (Virginia Film Festival); August 26, 2011 (United States)
- Running time: 99 minutes
- Countries: United States; Australia; Mexico
- Language: English
- Budget: $25 million
- Box office: $38.3 million

Don't Be Afraid of the Dark is a 2010 dark fantasy horror film written by Guillermo del Toro and Matthew Robbins, and directed by Troy Nixey in his feature directorial debut. It is a remake of the 1973 ABC made-for-television film of the same name. The film stars Katie Holmes, Guy Pearce, and Bailee Madison as a family moving into a 19th-century Rhode Island mansion, where the withdrawn daughter begins to witness malevolent creatures that emerge from a sealed ash pit in the basement of the house. Jack Thompson also stars in a supporting role. An international co-production between the United States, Australia, and Mexico, it was filmed at the Drusilla Mansion in Mount Macedon and Melbourne (both in Victoria, Australia).

Don't Be Afraid of the Dark was released theatrically in the United States on August 26, 2011, by FilmDistrict. The film received mixed reviews from critics, who praised the performances, direction, atmosphere, and musical score, but criticized the jump scares and lack of originality. It grossed $38.3 million against a $25 million budget.

== Plot ==
At Blackwood Manor in Providence County, Rhode Island in the 19th century, renowned wildlife painter Lord Emerson Blackwood summons his housekeeper to the basement and reluctantly bludgeons her to death. He removes her teeth, as well as his own, and offers them to mysterious creatures inside an ash pit within an old fireplace; the creatures reject his offer and demand only the teeth of children. Blackwood begs for them to return his son, only to be dragged inside.

In the present day, 8-year-old Sally Hurst arrives in Rhode Island to live with her father Alex and his girlfriend Kim. The two are renovating Blackwood Manor for a client. Sally is depressed due to her mother dumping her in Alex's care and giving her copious amounts of Adderall. The creatures are awakened by a tune from the nightlight. The next day, Sally follows the voices calling her name to a sealed fireplace. "BE AFRAID" is written in runes above it.

Sally unbolts the fireplace and finds some of the housekeeper's teeth. The creatures prove to be hostile, stealing Alex's razor and shredding Kim's clothes. Alex blames Sally and finds a 19th-century silver coin in her possession, which she found under her pillow after a tooth she placed there disappeared. Sally sneaks to the basement to talk with the creatures, but Mr. Harris, one of the workers, tries to seal up the fireplace. He is attacked by the creatures and hospitalised.

Kim visits Mr. Harris in the hospital, who directs her to the local library, where she finds Lord Blackwood's unpublished artwork depicting tooth fairy-like creatures. The librarian explains they sometimes turn a human into one of their own. Sally is attacked again by the creatures, whose leader is a transformed Lord Blackwood. Kim finds a mural painted by Blackwood, depicting his son being taken by the creatures. Sally is trapped in the library by the creatures, but she keeps them at bay using her camera flash, as light repels them. She manages to kill one by crushing it with a bookcase.

Alex and Kim try to flee the house with Sally, but they are all subdued. Sally awakens to find herself being dragged to the basement for her transformation. Kim frees Sally, only to get caught in the ropes; her legs are gruesomely broken. The creatures drag Kim into the fireplace, as a distraught Sally crushes the former Lord Blackwood to death. Alex and Sally mourn their loss.

Sometime later, Alex and Sally return to the abandoned mansion to leave a drawing of Kim there. After they leave, a draft blows the drawing into the creatures' lair; the entrance now bolted with metal. Kim has now been transformed. As the creatures plan to come out, Kim convinces them to stay in hiding because others will come and they "have all the time in the world."

== Cast ==
- Bailee Madison as Sally Hurst
- Katie Holmes as Kim Raphael
- Guy Pearce as Alex Hurst
- Jack Thompson as William Harris
- Alan Dale as Charles Jacoby
- Trudy Hellier as Evelyn Jacoby
- Julia Blake as Mrs. Underhill
- Garry McDonald as Emerson Blackwood
- Nicholas Bell as Psychiatrist
- James Mackay as Librarian
- Emelia Burns as Caterer

Additionally, Grant Piro, Dylan Young, Guillermo del Toro, Todd MacDonald, and Angus Smallwood provide the voices for the creatures.

== Production ==
Co-writer and producer Guillermo del Toro chose comic-book artist Troy Nixey to direct the film, after seeing Nixey's short film Latchkey's Lament (2007). For the design of the creatures in the film, Nixey drew inspiration from pictures of mole rats.

Del Toro has attributed the idea of giving the creatures in the film a fairy origin to the work of the writer Arthur Machen, saying in an interview, "I love the Welsh author Arthur Machen and his idea that fairy lore comes from a dark place, that it’s derived from little, pre-human creatures who are really, really nasty vermin but are magical in a way, living as they do for hundreds of years. His books are what compelled me to do this." Machen's stories are specifically mentioned in the film by the librarian character. Del Toro said his work was also an influence on Pan's Labyrinth (2006) and Hellboy II: The Golden Army (2008), both of which also feature fairy creatures.

The name of "Emerson Blackwood", the character who built the mansion in the film, is a tribute to Algernon Blackwood, another writer of supernatural horror stories.

== Release ==
This picture, which was developed with Miramax in the wake of the division's closure and sale, was released by FilmDistrict and was rated R despite filmmaker ambitions to the contrary. Del Toro has stated, "We originally thought we could shoot it as PG-13 without compromising the scares ... And then the MPAA came back and gave us a badge of honor. They gave us an R for 'Violence and Terror.' We asked them if there was anything we could do, and they said, 'Why ruin a perfectly scary movie?'"

The initial release date was scheduled for January 21, 2011, but due to the sale of Miramax by the Walt Disney Company in December 2010, the release was put on hold until the sale was finalized. The film was eventually released on August 26, 2011, after Filmyard Holdings had taken over the company. Additionally, Nixey narrated the film at a screening at the 2010 San Diego Comic-Con.

It was released on DVD and Blu-ray on January 3, 2012 in the US by Sony Pictures Home Entertainment and February 20, 2012 in the UK by StudioCanal.

== Reception ==
On Rotten Tomatoes, the film has an approval rating of 61% based on reviews from 178 critics, with an average rating of 5.9/10. The website's critical consensus states, "While it's pleasantly atmospheric and initially quite scary, Don't Be Afraid of the Dark ultimately fails to deliver the skin-crawling chills of the original". On Metacritic, it has a weighted average score 56 out of 100 based on reviews from 35 critics, indicating "mixed or average" reviews. Audiences polled by CinemaScore gave the film an average grade of "C−" on an A+ to F scale.

Roger Ebert of the Chicago Sun-Times gave the film 3½ stars out of 4, calling it "a very good haunted house film" and adding that it "milks our frustration deliciously."
