= Peter Turgeon =

American actor (1919–2000)

- Turgeon in Airport 1970
- Born: Boyd Higginson Turgeon; December 25, 1919; Hinsdale, Illinois, U.S.
- Died: October 6, 2000 (aged 80); Stony Brook, New York, U.S.
- Occupation(s): Film, television and theatre actor
- Years active: 1940–1989
- Spouse: Virginia Richardson (m. 1954; died 1993)
- Children: 2

Boyd Higginson Turgeon (December 25, 1919 – October 6, 2000), known professionally as Peter Turgeon, was an American film, television, and theatre actor. He was perhaps best known for playing the caustic and interfering passenger Marcus Rathbone in the 1970 film Airport.

== Life and career ==
Turgeon was born in Hinsdale, Illinois. He began his career in 1940, appearing in a touring production titled Life With Father. He then served in the United States Army Air Corps, returning to acting in 1946. Turgeon appeared in stage plays including Call Me Mister, Brigadoon, The Beggar's Opera, A Thurber Carnival and Send Me No Flowers. In 1954 to 1955 he was an assistant stage manager for the Broadway play The Tender Trap.

On screen Turgeon played Jack Peterson in seven episodes of the television sitcom Mister Peepers, starring Wally Cox. He also appeared in the television soap operas Dark Shadows, The Edge of Night and General Hospital. Turgeon guest-starred in television programs including The Phil Silvers Show, L.A. Law, The Jeffersons, The Defenders, The Patty Duke Show and Naked City. He also appeared in films such as Muscle Beach Party, Me, Natalie, Some Kind of a Nut, Dear Heart, The World of Henry Orient and The Possession of Joel Delaney.

After retiring from film and television in 1989, Turgeon worked as an actor, director and writer for the Eugene O'Neill Theatre Center in Waterford, Connecticut, also working at the John Drew Theatre at Guild Hall of East Hampton in East Hampton, New York.

== Death ==
Turgeon died in October 2000 at the Long Island State Veterans Home in Stony Brook, New York.

== Filmography ==
| Year | Title | Role | Notes |
|---|---|---|---|
| 1964 | The World of Henry Orient | Orchestra Member | |
| 1964 | Muscle Beach Party | Theodore | |
| 1964 | Dear Heart | Peterson | |
| 1968 | What's So Bad About Feeling Good? | Security Expert | Uncredited |
| 1969 | Last Summer | Mr. Caudell | Uncredited |
| 1969 | Me, Natalie | Attorney | |
| 1969 | Some Kind of a Nut | Thomas Allen Defoe | |
| 1970 | Airport | Marcus Rathbone | |
| 1972 | The Possession of Joel Delaney | Detective Brady | |
| 1973 | From the Mixed-Up Files of Mrs. Basil E. Frankweiler | Counterman | |
| 1980 | American Gigolo | Julian's Lawyer | |
