= West 10 LDN =

- Title card
- Also known as: W10 LDN; West 10 London
- Genre: Youth drama
- Written by: Noel Clarke
- Directed by: Menhaj Huda
- Starring: Ashley Madekwe; Duane Henry; Chi Kolo; Andre Squire; Noel Clarke; Ashley Walters; Fraser Ayres; Tamer Hassan; Adam Deacon; Nick Nevern
- Theme music composer: The Angel
- Country of origin: United Kingdom
- Original language: English

Production
- Executive producers: Menhaj Huda; Derek Wax
- Producer: Tim Cole
- Production location: London
- Cinematography: Duncan Telford
- Editor: Chris Muckle
- Running time: 60 minutes
- Production company: Kudos Film & Television

Original release
- Network: BBC Three
- Release: 10 March 2008

West 10 LDN is a one-off BBC Three youth drama, written and created by Noel Clarke and directed by Menhaj Huda, first broadcast on 10 March 2008. The screenplay was based on the novel Society Within, a short story collection by Courttia Newland. The film was the second collaboration between Clarke and Huda, following their work on Kidulthood, which gave Huda the idea for a television series based upon a similar format. West 10 LDN is set entirely in the fictional Greenside council housing estate in West London, which in reality, is the White City Estate. Ashley Madekwe and Duane Henry served as lead actors for the project.

West 10 LDN was produced by the award-winning Kudos Film & Television, who had enjoyed recent success with Life On Mars, Spooks and Hustle. Tim Cole was assigned as producer and Derek Wax served as executive producer Derek Wax. West 10 LDN was broadcast as part of BBC Three's Drama Pilot Season, in which six different one-hour pilots were broadcast, with the highest-rated going on to be developed into a six-part series.

Although it received critical acclaim from fans of Kidulthood and Adulthood alike, Noel Clarke later confirmed on his official MySpace page that the then controllers of BBC Three, Danny Cohen and Jane Tranter, had made the decision not to commission West 10 LDN into a full series.

== Plot ==
Nineteen-year-old Elisha (Ashley Madekwe), her mother and sister arrive on the Greenside estate, ready to move into their new flat, after their last flat was burnt down whilst they were visiting Elisha's father's grave. Whilst moving in, a box of Elisha's stuff is stolen from their car by a local thug. She immediately accuses Valerie (Chi Kolo) and her group of friends, but soon discover they were not involved. In the process, however, she becomes friends with Valerie - who offers to help her get her box back. At the local youth club, Elisha attempts to identify the thief - but finds herself immersed in a world of crazy socialism, run by Lacey (Ashley Walters) and Michael (Noel Clarke), and fame-seeking DJ Nathan (Adam Deacon). Meanwhile, local gang member Orin (Duane Henry) believes he has hit the jackpot when he recovers a stash of drugs dropped during a police arrest.

However, his best friend Will (Andre Squire), is not so sure, but soon sets up a deal with local drug dealer Maverick (Nick Nevern), who offers the pair £1600 for the stash. Unlucky for them, the owners of the stash are on their tail - and they want their drugs back. After not having any luck at the youth club, Valerie and Elisha meet up with Val's boyfriend Ray (Fraser Ayres), who offers to help Elisha get her box back - and directs the pair to local Turkish pimp Gout (Tamer Hassan). After Gout fails to cough up the goods, Elisha decides to steal her own stuff back. As Valerie and Elisha attempt to escape the wrath of Gout, they come across Orin and Will being beaten by the owners of the stash - and with the help of a cup of foundation, manage to save them from being beaten to death. Orin owes his life to Elisha - and soon, a relationship between the pair begins to blossom.

== Cast ==
- Ashley Madekwe as Elisha
- Duane Henry as Orin
- Chi Kolo as Valerie
- John Joseph as Will
- Noel Clarke as Michael
- Ashley Walters as Lacey
- Fraser Ayres as Ray
- Tamer Hassan as Gout
- Adam Deacon as Nathan
- Nick Nevern as Maverick
- Kyla Frye as Tawanda
- Suzette Llewellyn as Veronica
- Mikel Ameen as Little Stacey
- Jacob Anderson as Benji
- Madeleine Fairley as Lillian
- Kamara Bacchus as Leonora
- La Charné Jolly as Sissy
- Kyle Summercorn as Johnny
- Josef Altin as Ratty
- Latoya Lees as Carolin
- Nicôle Lecky as Danielle
- Demi Oyediran as Beth
- Imdad Miah as Mohammed
- Joseph Makain as Jerome
- Nina Wadia as Clerk
