= Desert Fury =

1947 film by Lewis Allen

- Theatrical release poster
- Directed by: Lewis Allen
- Screenplay by: Robert Rossen; A. I. Bezzerides (uncredited)
- Based on: Desert Town by Ramona Stewart
- Produced by: Hal B. Wallis
- Starring: Lizabeth Scott; John Hodiak; Burt Lancaster; Mary Astor; Wendell Corey
- Cinematography: Edward Cronjager; Charles Lang
- Edited by: Warren Low
- Music by: Miklós Rózsa
- Production company: Hal Wallis Productions
- Distributed by: Paramount Pictures
- Release dates: July 23, 1947 (Salt Lake City); August 15, 1947 (U.S.)
- Running time: 96 minutes
- Country: United States of America
- Language: English
- Box office: $2.9 million (USA rentals)

Desert Fury is a 1947 American film noir crime film directed by Lewis Allen, and starring Lizabeth Scott, John Hodiak and Burt Lancaster. Its plot follows the daughter of a casino owner in a small Nevada town who becomes involved with a racketeer who was once suspected of murdering his wife. The screenplay was written by Robert Rossen and A. I. Bezzerides (uncredited), adapted from the 1946 novel Desert Town by Ramona Stewart. The picture was produced by Hal Wallis, with music by Miklós Rózsa and cinematography in Technicolor by Edward Cronjager and Charles Lang.

The film had its world premiere in Salt Lake City in July 1947, and earned mixed reviews from critics. In the years since its release, the film has been subject to significant film criticism from scholars and critics for its overtones of homosexuality, particularly in the relationship between two of its central male characters.

== Plot ==
Gangster Eddie Bendix and his henchman, Johnny Ryan, arrive in the small mining town of Chuckawalla in northern Nevada, where Eddie hopes to cash in on the local community's gambling trade, which is overseen by the powerful Fritzie Haller, owner of the Purple Sage casino. The two men stop at a bridge entering Chuckawalla where Eddie's wife, Angela, died in a car accident. Eddie was once involved with Fritzie, but left town under suspicion of causing his wife's fatal car accident. At the bridge, they are met by Fritzie's daughter, Paula, who asks them to move their vehicle so she can cross the bridge. Paula has just dropped out of college and has returned home.

Paula finds her relationship with her mother contentious and competitive, and, having felt long pressured by her mother, insists she finally wants to make her own choices. Meanwhile, she reunites with her friend, deputy sheriff Tom Hanson, a former rodeo performer who has long been in love with her. Impressed by Tom's honesty and character, Fritzie offers to buy Tom a ranch if he proposes to Paula. An offended Tom blatantly exposes Fritzie's plot to Paula, enraging Fritzie and furthering the disconnect between her and her daughter.

While leaving town, Paula encounters Eddie at the bridge, and offers him a ride back to the ranch where he is staying with Johnny. Johnny is highly protective of Eddie and antagonistic toward Paula, which becomes clearer as Paula and Eddie develop a romance. Paula is fascinated to later learn from Tom that she strongly resembles Eddie's deceased wife, a fact that does not deter her from continuing to pursue Eddie, further driving a rift between Eddie and Johnny, culminating in Eddie cutting ties with him.

Fritzie forbids Paula from further pursuing Eddie, and grows enraged by Paula's obstinance. When Paula returns to the ranch to visit Eddie one night, Johnny threatens to murder her. Shortly after, Tom arrests Eddie for drunk driving and interrogates him. Eddie returns to Fritzie's mansion, proposing that he and Paula elope. Fritzie asks the Sheriff, Pat Johnson, to arrest Eddie for the murder of his wife, but Pat insists there is no evidence. Fritzie reveals that Eddie worked for Paula's father, and that he also pursued her the same way he is pursuing Paula. Paula refutes her mother and leaves with Eddie.

As the two depart Chuckawalla, they reluctantly pick up Johnny, who is waiting on the road, and agree to drop him off in Las Vegas. The three stop at an all-night cafe. Inside, a seething Johnny draws a pistol and reveals to Paula that Eddie murdered Angela at his instruction, for fear that she would reveal their criminal activities. Horrified by Eddie's complicity, Paula flees as Eddie shoots Johnny to death. Speeding down the road back toward Chuckawalla, she is pursued by Eddie in another car. Tom joins the chase in his police car. Eddie loses control of his car, and it careens off the bridge into the riverbed. Tom radios backup and notifies Fritzie. Paramedics pull Eddie's body from the burning vehicle. Fritzie arrives at the bridge. She offers to help Paula make a new start in her life, and asks if she was in love with Eddie, to which Paula responds, "There is no Eddie Bendix; there never was. Everything I thought was his was really Johnny's." Paula assures Fritzie she will not run away again, and the two embrace, before Paula departs with Tom over the bridge.

== Cast ==
- John Hodiak as Eddie Bendix
- Lizabeth Scott as Paula Haller
- Burt Lancaster as Tom Hanson
- Wendell Corey as Johnny Ryan
- Mary Astor as Fritzie Haller
- Kristine Miller as Claire Lindquist
- William Harrigan as Judge Berle Lindquist
- James Flavin as Sheriff Pat Johnson
- Jane Novak as Mrs. Lindquist
- Anna Camargo as Rosa

== Analysis ==
In the years since its release, Desert Fury has been praised as a seminal and unique Hollywood melodrama due to its bold overtones of homosexuality. Film scholar Foster Hirsch wrote: "In a truly subversive move the film jettisons the characters' criminal activities to concentrate on two homosexual couples: the mannish mother who treats her daughter like a lover, and the gangster and his devoted possessive sidekick... Desert Fury is shot in the lurid, over-saturated colors that would come to define the 1950s melodramas of Douglas Sirk."

Eddie Muller, writer and founder of the Film Noir Foundation, similarly assessed the film: "Desert Fury is the gayest movie ever produced in Hollywood's golden era. The film is saturated—with incredibly lush color, fast and furious dialogue dripping with innuendo, double entendres, dark secrets, outraged face-slappings, overwrought Miklos Rosza violins. How has this film escaped revival or cult status? It's Hollywood at its most gloriously berserk."

Writing for Film Comment, Ronald Bergan suggests that it is impossible to discern whether the homosexual undertones in the relationship between Eddie and Johnny were "intended or inadvertent... Since Vito Russo's 1981 book The Celluloid Closet, we have grown accustomed to reading cryptic messages of homosexuality in pre-Sixties Hollywood movies. But the Eddie-Johnny relationship is too overt to be intentionally gay in the Hollywood of the Forties. If Desert Fury had been made in exactly the same way today, however, there would be nothing oblique about the liaison."

In one notable piece of dialogue for the period, Paula asks Eddie how he and Johnny met. He replies: "It was in the automat off Times Square, about two o'clock in the morning on a Saturday. I was broke, he had a couple of dollars, we got to talking. He ended up paying for my ham and eggs." "And then?", Paula asks. To which the reply is: "I went home with him that night. We were together from then on." Film scholar David Ehrenstein cites this dialogue as an example of "the remarkable degree of specificity with which sexual status is detailed" in the film.

Film scholar Imogen Sara Smith writes in In Lonely Places: Film Noir Beyond the City (2014) that the film's flamboyant visuals and undercurrents of homosexuality "tend to mask its real theme, [which is] the weakness and dependency that lurk behind glamorously hard-boiled exteriors... Set in a West thoroughly tainted by crime, money, corruption, and social snobbery, the film is a study of people trying to lasso and bridle the objects of their desire."

== Production ==
=== Casting ===
John Hodiak's casting alongside Lizabeth Scott was announced in July 1946. This was the first screen appearance of Wendell Corey, like Lancaster, a contracted discovery of producer Hal Wallis.

=== Filming ===
The majority of the film was shot on studio sets designed to appear as desert locales. The production had red sandstone and gravel transported from Arizona to Los Angeles for the set shooting. Some location shooting occurred in the small Ventura County, California, town of Piru, with the northwest side of Center Street, at Main, used as the exterior of Fritzi's saloon and casino; the Piru Mansion was used as the Haller home and the historic Piru bridge was used as the locale of the car crash. Additional exteriors were shot in Palmdale, as well as the Arizona cities of Clarkdale and Cottonwood, the latter of which was entirely leased by the production for filming, and included local residents as extras.

=== Music ===
Miklós Rózsa was hired to compose the film's original score, which he began composing in December 1946.

== Release ==
Released by Paramount Pictures, the film had its world premiere in Salt Lake City on Wednesday, July 23, 1947, with principal stars Burt Lancaster and Lizabeth Scott in attendance. It was subsequently given a wide theatrical release on August 15, 1947, and premiered in Los Angeles on October 29, 1947.

Paramount reissued the film in February 1959.

=== Critical response ===
==== Contemporary ====
When the film was released, The New York Times roundly despised it. They wrote, "Desert Fury is a beaut—a beaut of a Technicolored mistake from beginning to end. If this costly Western in modern dress had been made by a lesser producer than Hal Wallis it could be dismissed in a sentence. But Mr. Wallis is a man with a considerable reputation, being a two-time winner of the Irving Thalberg Award of the Academy of Motion Picture Arts and Sciences, and Desert Fury is such an incredibly bad picture in all respects save one, and that is photographically."

Grace Kingsley of the Los Angeles Times described the film as a Western "all dolled up with psychological angles and assorted neuroses," and praised Wendell Corey's performance as a strong point. Helen Bower of the Detroit Free Press praised the film's scenery and cinematography as "genuinely sublime," with a story that "presents a far less sublime story of human emotions of weakness."

James Agee of Time wrote that the film "is easy to take with tongue in cheek, impossible to take with a straight face... [its] intricate difficulties are presented in a leathery, smart-cracking kind of dialogue that sounds like an illegitimate great-grandchild of Ernest Hemingway's prose. A remarkable amount of footage is devoted to the way Miss Scott walks, chews over a line like a bit of Sen-Sen before getting it out, and tools a high-powered convertible around a curve. This is, in fact, one of the most auto-maniacal movies since James Cagney's racing classic, The Crowd Roars (1932)."

==== Modern assessment ====
As of May 2023, the film holds an approval rating of 57% based on 7 critical reviews on review aggregator website Rotten Tomatoes, with an average rating of 5.5/10.

=== Preservation ===
In 2012, the Academy Film Archive preserved a screen test for Desert Fury, with Burt Lancaster and Lizabeth Scott.

=== Home media ===
The film was released by Kino Lorber on Blu-ray and DVD in the United States on February 12, 2019.

== See also ==
- List of American films of 1947

== Sources ==
- Ehrenstein, David (1999). "Desert Fury, Mon Amour". In Henderson, Brian; Martin, Ann; Amazonas, Lee (eds.). Film Quarterly: Forty Years, a Selection. Berkeley, California: University of California Press. pp. 474–493. ISBN 978-0-520-21603-7.
- Hirsch, Foster (2008). The Dark Side of the Screen: Film Noir. New York City, New York: Da Capo Press. ISBN 978-0-306-81772-4.
- Muller, Eddie (1998). Dark City: The Lost World of Film Noir. New York City, New York: St. Martin's. ISBN 978-0-312-18076-8.
- Smith, Imogen Sara (2014). In Lonely Places: Film Noir Beyond the City. Jefferson, North Carolina: McFarland. ISBN 978-0-786-48908-4.
