= Piru Mansion =

Building in Piru, California

Coordinates: 34°24′54.58″N 118°47′36.93″W

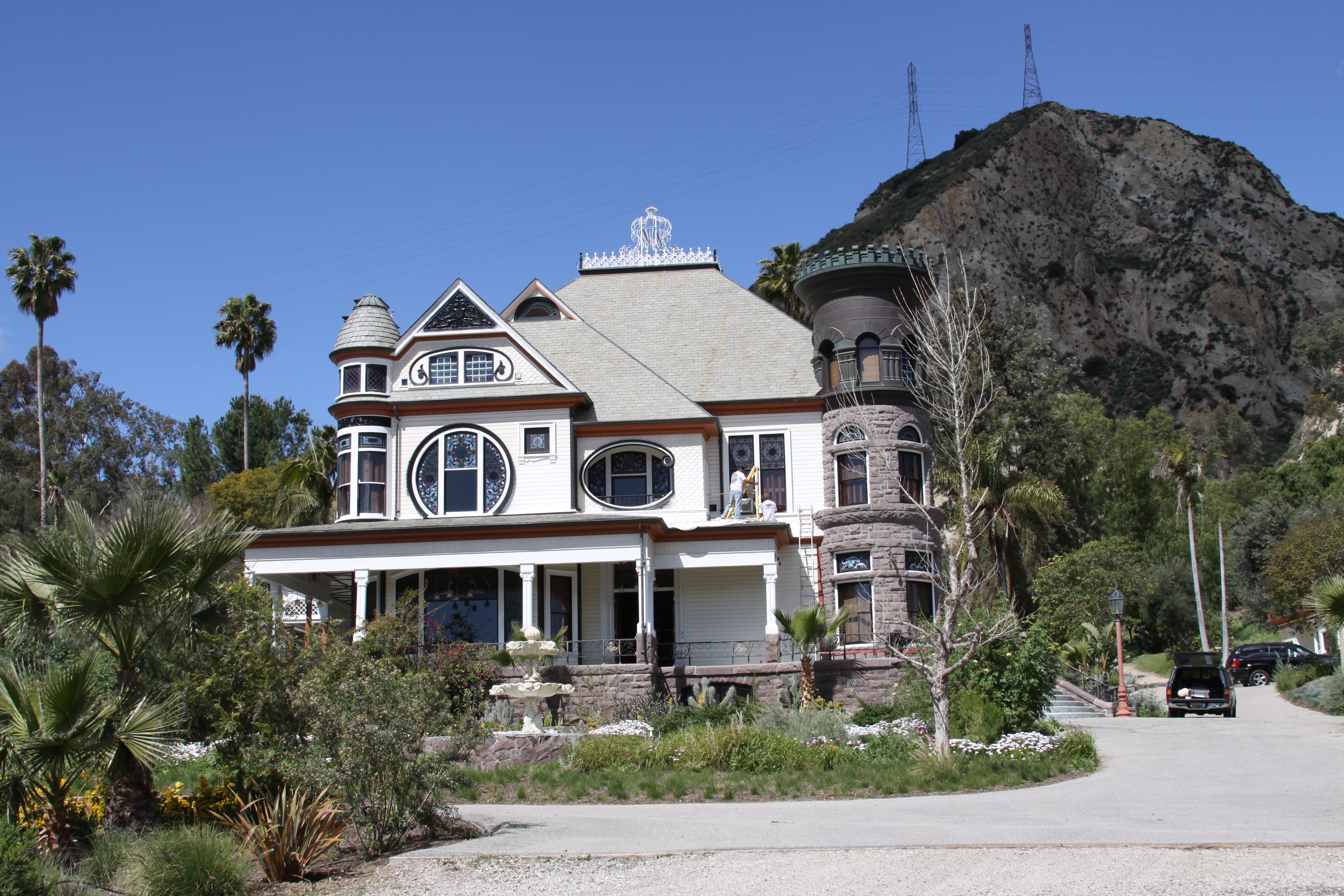
Piru Mansion in 2010.

The Piru Mansion is a Queen Anne Style home located in Piru, California.

== History ==
Also known as the Newhall Mansion or Cook Mansion, the Piru Mansion was built in 1886 and is Ventura County Historical Landmark #4. It was built by Piru's founder, David C. Cook, a wealthy publisher of Sunday School tracts and supplies from Illinois, who had wanted to establish a "Second Garden of Eden," specifying, tradition says, the planting of Biblical apricots, dates, figs, grapes, olives, and pomegranates. Cook's house became known as the Piru Mansion because of Sunkist's "Mansion Brand" valencia oranges, which can still be found in the area. The mansion originally used natural gas as it possessed no electricity or running water.

The mansion and the surrounding land, Piru Fruit Rancho, was purchased by Hugh Warring, of Buckhorn Ranch, and his wife, Orie J., in 1912. He had two adjoining bathrooms installed upstairs. In 1934, the Warrings built another home on the property, now known as the Warring Stone House. Hugh's son Floyd lived in this second house on the property until his death in 1965. The Warring family owned the Piru Mansion for a total of 56 years, from 1912 until it was sold to the Newhalls in 1968, making them the longest-running owners of the original historical home.

In 1968, the Mansion was purchased by the Newhall family. Scott Newhall began restoring it after the earthquake of 1971, during which the two chimneys were knocked down. In February 1981, a spark from a painter's blow torch ignited the house while it was being painted and burnt it to the ground. The owners, seeking to reconstruct their home, used old photographs and the assistance of people who had restored the house during its lifetime. The new mansion was completed in December 1983.

In 1994, the Northridge earthquake also knocked down two chimneys. In 2003, the Newhalls sold the Piru Mansion to David Newhall Hill, a relative of the Newhall family. In 2012, the Mansion was sold to a private investment group and converted into an event venue for weddings, corporate retreats and other occasions as well as a private vacation rental for overnight accommodations.

== Film and television ==
The Piru Mansion has been shown in numerous films, as well as television and commercials. Some of the films and television series the Mansion has been used in are: Desert Fury, Don't Be Afraid of the Dark, The X-Files, Charmed, Melrose Place, Murder She Wrote, Charlie's Angels, The Incredible Hulk, Payne American Wedding and Hart to Hart, among many others. Piru Mansion was used as the home of Ellis Wyatt in Atlas Shrugged: Part I, the first segment in a three-part movie adaptation of the novel by Ayn Rand. Most recently, Piru Mansion was used as the set for Escape the Night, presented by YouTube Red.

Some of the noteworthy personalities who have acted in productions shot at the Piru Mansion include: Shelley Winters, June Allyson, Buddy Ebsen, Ricardo Montalbán, Kim Darby, Robert Duvall, Patty Duke, James Garner, Angela Lansbury, Shirley Jones, John Larroquette, David Duchovny, Shannen Doherty, William Demarest, Alyssa Milano, Joey Graceffa, Shane Dawson, Eva Gutowski, GloZell Green, Lele Pons and many more.

== See also ==
- Ventura County Historic Landmarks & Points of Interest
