= Don't Be Afraid of the Dark (1973 film) =

1973 television film by John Newland

- VHS artwork
- Genre: Supernatural horror
- Written by: Nigel McKeand
- Directed by: John Newland
- Starring: Kim Darby; Jim Hutton
- Music by: Billy Goldenberg
- Country of origin: United States
- Original language: English

Production
- Executive producer: Lee Rich
- Producer: Allen S. Epstein
- Production locations: Piru Mansion – 829 & 837 Park Road, Piru, California
- Cinematography: Andrew Jackson
- Editors: Gene Fowler Jr.; Michael McCrosker
- Running time: 74 minutes
- Production company: Lorimar Productions

Original release
- Network: ABC
- Release: October 10, 1973

Don't Be Afraid of the Dark is an American made-for-television supernatural horror film directed by John Newland and starring Kim Darby and Jim Hutton. It was released by Lorimar Productions and was first telecast on ABC on Wednesday October 10, 1973, as the ABC Movie of the Week. It has since been shown many times in syndication and was distributed on home video. It is known as Nightmare in certain countries in Europe. A theatrical remake of the same name was released on August 26, 2011.

== Plot ==
Sally Farnham and her husband Alex inherit an old mansion from Sally's recently deceased grandmother. Shortly after moving in, she discovers a bricked-up fireplace in the basement den. The estate's handyman, Mr. Harris, tells her that Sally's grandmother had him seal it up after her grandfather died and that it is better to leave it the way it is. After he leaves for the day, she uses some of Harris' tools to try to remove the bricks herself. She fails, but is able to pry open a small side door used for removing fireplace ashes. Inside is not a fireplace at all but a large, dark, deep sub-basement. As Sally leaves the den, several whispering voices call her name from behind the fireplace, proclaiming that "She set us free."

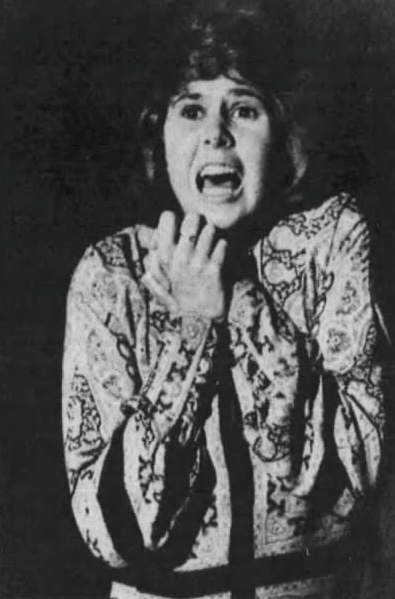
Kim Darby as Sally Farnham

Sally begins to feel unsettled in the house. One night she is awakened by voices whispering her name, and an ashtray mysteriously falls off her bedside cabinet. Alex dismisses her concerns and believes she is suffering from nervous tension. The next evening, something grabs her dress as she is walking down the stairs and she hears voices whispering "We want you." Freeing herself, she sees something scuttling away behind a curtain, which she believes is a small animal of some kind. Later, she hears the same whispering coming from behind the fireplace in the basement den. Alex remains unconvinced of her story, but makes sure the ash door is bolted securely shut.

The following night, Sally throws a dinner party for Alex's colleagues at his law firm. During the party, Sally sees a small, hideous goblin-like creature near her leg under the dinner table. She screams, but nobody believes what she saw and the creature quickly vanishes. Alex grows impatient with her and thinks she is becoming delusional. While Sally is in the shower, three of the goblin creatures turn out the lights so that they can attack her with a razor. As Sally turns the light back on, the creatures shriek and retreat from the brightness into the bathroom cupboards where they disappear. She tells Alex they should sell the house.

The following day, Alex goes away on business and Sally arranges to go and stay with her friend Joan. Before she goes, the creatures attempt to trip Sally down a flight of stairs, but they accidentally cause the death of her interior decorator instead. Sally tries to confront the creatures and asks them what they want, and they reply they want her spirit. Whoever frees them (as Sally did by opening the fireplace) must become one of them. Sally's doctor prescribes sedatives and her friend Joan stays with her. Joan begins to believe Sally's story. Alex remains unconvinced. He leaves to meet their handyman regarding the history of the house and the fireplace. Sally tries to stay awake but the creatures put sedatives into her coffee and cut the electricity. They lock Joan outside when she checks the circuit breaker. Sally manages to walk downstairs, but the creatures trip her in the dark. While she is semi-conscious, they drag her into the basement den and into the unsealed fireplace.

Sally, now one of the creatures, patiently waits for their next victim to move into the house.

== Cast ==
- Kim Darby as Sally Farnham
- Jim Hutton as Alex Farnham
- William Demarest as Mr. Harris
- Barbara Anderson as Joan Kahn
- Pedro Armendáriz Jr. as Francisco Perez
- William Sylvester as Tom
- Celia Kaye as Anne
- Felix Silla, Tamara De Treaux and Patty Maloney as the Creatures

== Production ==
Principal photography of Don't Be Afraid of the Dark began in mid-August 1973.

The actors portraying the creatures in the film—Felix Silla, Tamara De Treaux and Patty Maloney—were all performers with dwarfism. In order to achieve the illusion of the creatures being significantly smaller than humans, the three actors were filmed performing deliberately oversized sets. The masks worn by Silla, De Traux, and Maloney were moulded from alginate and plaster and then airbrushed with paint.

Exterior shots were filmed at the Piru Mansion in Piru, California.

== Release ==
Don't Be Afraid of the Dark premiered on ABC as a Movie of the Week on October 10, 1973.

=== Home media ===
Don't Be Afraid of the Dark was released on VHS through USA Home Video in 1985. It was released on DVD on August 18, 2009, by Warner Archive burn-on-demand service. This release went out of print the following year, but was remastered and re-released again on August 24, 2011. This newly restored release of the film was timed to release with the theatrical release of the remake two days later. In 2019, it was given a 4K remaster and released on Blu-ray by Warner Archive.

In January 2026, Iconoscope and Vinegar Syndrome released the film on 4K UHD Blu-ray, licensed from Warner Bros.

== Reception ==
Kevin Thomas of the Los Angeles Times praised the film's cast but panned the screenplay, writing: "Incredibly, this movie is not intentionally comedy. That it has been played absolutely straight, therefore, makes it all the more ludicrous."

Maitland McDonagh from TV Guide rated the film three out of a possible five stars, calling the film "[an] above-average, made-for-TV chiller" also writing, "Overall the film may be a little slow and obvious by today's standards, but these stand-out moments insure it a place in the memories of children of the '70s". Donald Guarisco from AllMovie gave the film a positive review, calling the film "a potent little fright-fest", complimenting the film's script, acting, characterizations, steadily built tension, and Newland's tense direction. Ian Jane from DVD Talk wrote, "While Don't Be Afraid Of The Dark may not be a deep film nor will it win any awards for originality, it's a fun seventies horror picture with some memorable moments, great camerawork and a genuinely surprising finale."

On his website Fantastic Movie Musings and Ramblings, Dave Sindelar gave the film a mixed review, criticizing the film's familiar storyline, Demarest's clichéd character, and overuse of the whispering voices of the creatures. However, Sindelar called it "one of the better made-for-TV horror movies out there" and stated that the film did have its moments.

Bloody Disgusting felt that the film had become dated, and criticized what it called Darby's overacting, creature design, and forced perspective shots of the creatures. The review did, however, commend the film for its "campy surrealism" which they felt was the film's strongest attribute. In a 2017 retrospective for PopMatters, Michael Barrett felt the film "looks cheap and flat," but commended it as "socially relevant with an air of sick dread."

== Legacy ==
Director Guillermo del Toro (who produced and co-wrote the film's remake) was heavily influenced by it when he saw it on television as a child. He and his brothers would reportedly follow each other around the house saying "Sally, Sally", mimicking the creatures in the 1973 film. "It was something close to my heart for a very long time ... We thought the movie was the most terrifying on Earth", said del Toro.

=== Remake ===
Miramax produced a remake of the film as a theatrical feature, released on August 26, 2011. The remake stars Bailee Madison, Katie Holmes and Guy Pearce, and was produced and co-written by Guillermo del Toro. The remake marks the directorial debut of comic book artist-writer Troy Nixey.

The remake is noted for its Freudian themes as well as the proto-feminist undertones and the "fears and anxieties about the changing roles of women and the ways they are so often victimized or go unheard."

== See also ==
- List of American films of 1973
- ABC Movie of the Week

== Sources ==
- Deal, David (2007). Television Fright Films of the 1970s. Jefferson, North Carolina: McFarland & Company. ISBN 978-0-786-42929-5.
- Muir, John Kenneth (2001). An Analytical Guide to Television's One Step Beyond, 1959-1961. Jefferson, North Carolina: McFarland & Company. ISBN 978-0-786-40969-3.
