= Lovelady Powell =

American actress (1930–2020)

- Born: Lovelady Hedges; May 9, 1930; Columbus, Ohio, U.S.
- Died: February 2, 2020 (aged 89)
- Other name: Lovey Powell
- Education: Northwestern University
- Occupations: Actress, singer

Lovelady Powell (born Lovelady Hedges, May 9, 1930 – February 2, 2020) was an American actress and singer, best known for I Never Sang for My Father, The Possession of Joel Delaney and The Happy Hooker.

== Life and career ==
Powell was born in Columbus, Ohio, and studied theater at Northwestern University. In the mid-1950s, she moved to New York City, where she had a supper-club act with pianist Brooks Morton. She also performed as a singer in night clubs, including the Blue Angel, Bon Soir, hungry i and Purple Onion. She and Shelley Berman made the recording "The Sex Life of the Primate."

On television, Powell portrayed Aunt Birdie Clayborn on The Secret Storm and Portia Fitzsimmons on Dark Shadows. She also portrayed Fran in a series of "Ask Fran" commercials for Lavoris mouthwash. She was seen in commercials for other products, including Downy water softener, Playtex bras, and Benson & Hedges cigarettes. She did voice-overs for commercials for Clairol hair coloring, Johnson & Johnson baby powder, Shower to Shower bath powder, and Chevrolet., among other brands.

On stage, Powell toured with José Ferrer in After the Fall and with Joel Grey in Stop the World, I Want to Get Off. She was in Venus Is, a Broadway show that closed during its preview performances, and in Two Weeks Somewhere Else, which closed in Boston before it reached Broadway. She also starred in the off-Broadway musical Riverwind.

In her later years, she and Peggy White operated Glad Hands Antique Shop.

== Filmography ==
- I Never Sang for My Father – 1970
- The Possession of Joel Delaney – 1972
- The Happy Hooker – 1975
