= A Stranger in the Mirror =

1976 novel by Sidney Sheldon

- First edition
- Author: Sidney Sheldon
- Language: English
- Publisher: William Morrow
- Publication date: 1976
- Publication place: United States
- Media type: Print (Hardback & Paperback)
- Pages: 322 pp
- ISBN: 0-688-03196-X
- OCLC: 3345201
- Dewey Decimal: 813/.5/4
- LC Class: PZ4.S5439 Bl PS3569.H3927

A Stranger in the Mirror is a 1976 novel written by Sidney Sheldon. The novel is one of the earliest of Sheldon's works, but contains the typical Sheldon fast-paced narration and several narrative techniques, with the exception of a twist ending. The novel tells the life story of two fictitious Hollywood celebrities—Toby Temple and Jill Castle (roman à clef on Sheldon's acquaintances Groucho Marx and Erin Fleming) and portrays the emotional extremes of success and failure and how people inevitably become victims of time. It was adapted into a television film in 1993 starring Perry King, Lori Loughlin, Christopher Plummer, and Juliet Mills.

== Plot summary ==
A retired captain recalls the cruise where he decided to retire, which involves the famous celebrity, Jill Castle. The book then goes back to the beginning of the lives of the two main characters: Jill and Toby Temple.

Born as the only child to German immigrants, Toby Temple as a child grows up in a working-class neighborhood with a weak butcher father and a domineering mother. Toby was born with an unnaturally large penis and is initially ashamed of it, but quickly learns to be proud of it seeing how many women he ends up seducing from classmates to women in his neighborhood. After running away to Hollywood to avoid a shotgun marriage, his delusion of being naturally funny and charming is shattered when he struggles to start his career as a comedian. Eventually, after years of hardship, he becomes a successful star through the help of Clifton Lawrence, a celebrity producer. The success, however, has made him an egomaniac who destroys the careers of anyone with the slightest fault against him and has to have everyone around him dependent on him, including Lawrence, whom he forces to drop all of his other celebrity clients.

Meanwhile, Toby's mother passes away, and at the same time a baby—Josephine Czinski—is born far away in Texas. She has dreams of making it as a star in Hollywood and is also in love with the town millionaire, David Kenyon. Changing her name to Jill Castle, she leaves her hometown of Odessa, Texas for Hollywood after she learns that David is engaged to another woman, Cissy, the morning after he nearly proposed to Jill himself. In reality, David's mother and Cissy trick David into thinking it would be a temporary marriage just to please his mother, but he fails to tell Jill about this. She discovers the difficulty of being an actress with no connections and, after being drugged into participating in a pornographic film, decides to start earning better roles in exchange for sexual favors. After a failed attempt at reuniting with David, who misses their rendezvous after Cissy attempts to kill herself, Jill returns to Hollywood and ends up working for the Toby Temple Show.

Toby is attracted to Jill, unaware of her promiscuous reputation. Toby tries his best to seduce her only to be rebuffed, which only goads him more. They bond over their humble beginnings and Toby marries her, despite Lawrence's warnings. Jill manipulates Toby into destroying the careers of those who have used her in the past, and eventually replaces Lawrence as his manager, ruining the latter's career, as he had dropped all other clients in favor of Toby.

Lawrence becomes bitter when forced to work at an agency where his weekly pay is less than what he spent on one evening when he was a somebody, andwaits for an opportunity to strike back at Jill. Hearing rumors of Jill's pornographic film appearance by chance at a screening, he finds the shady theatre where the movie is being played and bribes the operator to sell him a copy.

Lawrence lands at Toby's place with the tape of Jill only to learn that Toby and Jill left for the Cannes Film Festival. Toby suffers a paralyzing stroke at Cannes and is flown back to the US for treatment. His initial prognosis is poor, but Jill is determined to help him, and his miraculous improvement earns public approval, and she becomes even more famous than Toby. Riding the wave of public support, Toby gets his own show after his recovery. But, goaded by Jill, he takes too many assignments, rendering him weak and tired, and he suffers another stroke, this time in Russia, while Jill meets David staying at the same hotel. David finally explains to her the circumstances of his unwanted marriage with Cissy.

Toby's second stroke mars his appearance and paralyzes him completely, though this time, it is estimated he'll live for another 20 years thanks to his strong heart. Jill is unwilling to go through another grueling recovery as Toby's caretaker, and is attracted to David. In frustration, she tells a paralyzed Toby that she does not love him anymore but, as a result, begins to have nightmares about his moving eyes. She decides to drown him and stage his death as an accident, and while she is not charged with murder, Lawrence does not believe her story.

Lawrence hears of Jill's low-profile wedding to David and suspects her of murdering Toby to be with him. He follows them to their honeymoon cruise and forces David to watch Jill's pornographic film in which she performs sexual acts with a Mexican. As it happens, David has a longstanding hatred of Mexicans due to him catching his sister with their gardener in his youth that had led to him stabbing the gardener to death; the murder was covered up through his family connections. David is furious and, in his anger, he beats up Lawrence, breaking his nose. David leaves on a helicopter, while Lawrence gloats about his victory to Jill. Jill, depressed, hallucinates and sees Toby's face in the water and hears his voice beckoning her to come to him. She jumps off the boat to be with him.
