= Kamara Bacchus =

British actress (born 1986)

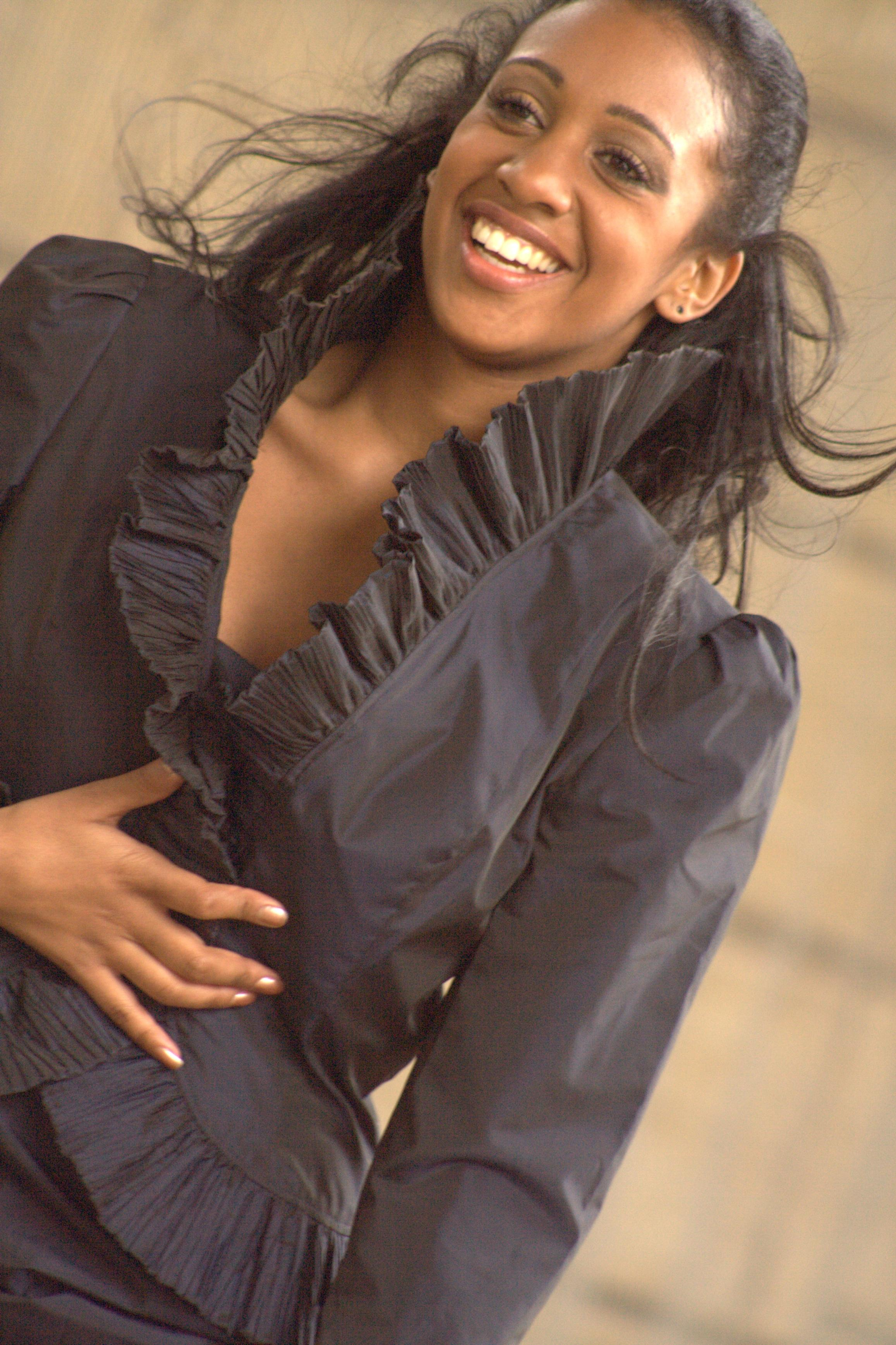
- Kamara Bacchus in 2006
- Born: 11 January 1986 (age 40); London, England
- Occupation: Actress
- Years active: 2003–present

Kamara Bacchus (born 11 January 1986) is a British actress.

== Biography ==
Her debut acting role was in the ITV police drama The Bill she then went on to play roles in the CBBC sitcom Kerching! followed by roles in West 10 LDN, the BBC comedy Beautiful People, and then on to a role in Doctor Who with the Eleventh Doctor.

Kamara is a graduate of the BRIT School. She was invited back in 2009 to give a talk as part of a career day alongside other former students.

Kamara used to present Radio shows on the digital station; colourful Radio and on her Royal Holloway University of London Radio Station 1287AM Insanity (now Insanity Radio 103.2FM).

Kamara was ranked second in a Miss Jamaica Beauty Pageant in 2004.

Whilst studying Kamara appeared in theatre productions of Ursula, American Dream, Macbeth and Our Country's Good.

== Filmography ==
Film and Television
Year	Title	Role	Other notes
2005	The Bill	Hazel	
2007	Kerching!	Kayla	
2008	West 10 LDN	Leonora	
2010	Doctor Who	Clubber	
