= The Possession of Joel Delaney (film) =

1972 film by Waris Hussein

- Original theatrical poster
- Directed by: Waris Hussein
- Screenplay by: Grimes Grice; Matt Robinson
- Based on: The Possession of Joel Delaney by Ramona Stewart
- Produced by: Martin Poll (Note: Poll left the project during principal photography due to creative differences with Shirley MacLaine, after which Lew Grade signed on to produce the film. Because of this, Poll had his name removed from the project, and the credits list no producer.)
- Starring: Shirley MacLaine; Perry King
- Cinematography: Arthur J. Ornitz
- Edited by: John Victor Smith
- Music by: Joe Raposo
- Production companies: Haworth Productions; ITC Entertainment
- Distributed by: Paramount Pictures (United States); Scotia-Barber (United Kingdom)
- Release dates: May 24, 1972 (United States); August 18, 1972 (United Kingdom)
- Running time: 105 minutes
- Countries: United States; United Kingdom
- Languages: English; Spanish
- Budget: $1.5 million

The Possession of Joel Delaney is a 1972 supernatural horror film directed by Waris Hussein and starring Shirley MacLaine and Perry King. It is based on the 1970 novel of the same title by Ramona Stewart. The plot follows a wealthy New York City divorcee whose brother becomes possessed by a deceased serial killer who committed a series of gruesome murders in Spanish Harlem.

Originally developed by producer Martin Poll and his production company, Haworth Productions, Poll abandoned the project shortly after filming began, due to creative differences with actress Shirley MacLaine. Following Poll's departure, British producer Lew Grade of ITC Entertainment overtook the project. Principal photography took place in New York City and London during the winter of 1971, on a budget of $1.5 million.

The Possession of Joel Delaney was released theatrically in the United States by Paramount Pictures in May 1972, and subsequently entered competition at the 22nd Berlin International Film Festival. It received a theatrical release in the United Kingdom shortly after, in August 1972. The film received mixed reviews from critics, though its theme of possession subsequently resulted in parallels being drawn by critics to The Exorcist, released a year later.

In the intervening years, the film has been the subject of film criticism surrounding its themes of social inequality, as well as familial relationships and incest.

== Plot ==
Norah Benson, an upperclass Manhattan divorcee, lives with her children, Peter and Carrie. She also has a younger adult brother, Joel Delaney, who has recently returned to New York after an extended visit to Tangier. She invites him to a reunion dinner at her home, but he fails to show. Concerned, Norah goes to Joel's East Village apartment, where she witnesses his being taken by police to the psychiatric ward of Bellevue Hospital. He has been accused of attacking his building superintendent. However, Joel is unable to recall the episode. At Norah's urging, Joel lies to the doctors, claiming he had taken hallucinogens. He is discharged on provision that he meet with a psychiatrist. Norah arranges an appointment for him with her friend Erika, who has actually known Joel most of his life. During their sessions, Joel recounts his close friendship with an ex-roommate named Tonio Perez. Meanwhile, Norah, having asked Joel to move in with her and the kids, observes his increasingly odd behavior: He asks Norah inappropriate questions about her sex life. Later, at his birthday party, he exhibits manic behavior, culminating in a series of crude insults to Norah's Puerto Rican maid, Veronica, which he relays in Spanish.

The following day, Norah visits the apartment of Joel's girlfriend, Sherry. Upon entering, she finds Sherry's decapitated corpse lying on her bed, and her severed head hanging from a houseplant. Police interview Norah and remark that Sherry's murder resembles serial killings that occurred the summer before in Spanish Harlem. They received little publicity since the victims were all Hispanic females. Detectives presume the perpetrator to be Tonio, who has been missing for several months, but his family and friends refuse to cooperate with authorities. With Veronica's help, Norah meets Don Pedro, a Santería practitioner in Harlem who arranges a ceremony to exorcise Tonio's spirit, which he believes has possessed Joel's body. In attendance is Tonio's grief-stricken mother, who admits to Norah that Tonio was in fact a serial murderer, and that when his father discovered this, he killed Tonio himself and disposed of his remains. Don Pedro concludes the ceremony is unsuccessful due to Norah's agnosticism toward the supernatural.

Norah returns home to find Joel screaming hysterically in Spanish. Frightened for her children's safety, she brings them to the family's beachfront vacation home in Long Island, while Erika promises to help Joel. The next morning, after returning from a walk on the beach, Norah finds Erika's severed head in the kitchen, and Joel standing nearby with his switchblade. Now uniformly possessed by Tonio, Joel torments and taunts Norah and the children. When the police arrive, Joel forces Peter to strip and dance naked on a table. He then forces Carrie to eat dog food, cutting her on the neck when she resists. An enraged Norah tries to stop him, but Joel brutally beats her before kissing her passionately. The children escape the house, and Joel runs after them. As a result, he is fatally shot by police. As Joel dies in Norah's arms, her behavior suddenly becomes emotionally distant. She then picks up Joel's switchblade and brandishes it menacingly at the police.

== Cast ==
- Shirley MacLaine as Norah Benson
- Perry King as Joel Delaney
- Michael Hordern as Justin
- Barbara Trentham as Sherry
- Míriam Colón as Veronica
- Earl Hyman as Charles
- David Elliott as Peter Benson
- Lisa Kohane as Carrie Benson
- Lovelady Powell as Erika
- Edmundo Rivera Álvarez as Don Pedro
- Teodorina Bello as Mrs. Perez
- Robert Burr as Ted Benson
- Ernesto Gonzalez as Young Man at Seance
- Aukie Herger as Mr. Perez
- Marita Lindholm as Marta Benson
- Peter Turgeon as Detective Brady
- Pat Ast as Mental Hospital Patient

== Themes ==
=== Social class ===
In his book Hearths of Darkness: The Family in the American Horror Film (2014), film scholar Tony Williams writes that The Possession of Joel Delaney is thematically preoccupied with the same "racial, economic, and class characteristics" of 1943's I Walked With a Zombie. This would refer to the depiction of Puerto Rican Americans as "superstitious voodoo devotees." Williams notes that Joel Delaney's opening party sequence set in an upper-class New York townhouse affirms this thematic exploration, with its "intercut shots [that] juxtapose affluent white guests with primitive voodoo masks placed in the demeaning position of trendy artifacts." It is further noted that "a black man [in the scene] stands alone. His face exhibits ethnic alienation."

Similarly, Williams notes a social-racial suggestiveness through the film's cinematography, particularly the "subtle, non-rhetorical camera movements" that occur during sequences between Norah and her maid, Veronica. The composition and framing of these scenes reveal the "oppressive nature of white power." Another writer, critic Charles Derry, has also noted that "even if The Possession of Joel Delaney grinds its ax rather obviously, the film works well both as a horror film and an allegory of modern class conflict."

=== Familial relationships ===
Familial trauma and incestual desire are two themes explored in this film, particularly with regard to the movie's two lead characters—Norah and her brother Joel. Throughout the film, several peripheral characters observe that Norah and Joel play out an unusual brother/sister relationship, with some commenting that the two resemble a romantic couple. Critic Tony Williams attests to Norah's sexual desire for Joel, as represented in the film's opening sequence, where she appears visibly jealous as Joel speaks with his ex-girlfriend. Additionally, it has been noted that Norah, who partly raised Joel, keeps him in a "state of childish dependence." This suggests that the film's title holds a double meaning, alluding to the supernatural spirit possession of Joel as well as the emotional possession of him by Norah.

Williams believes that the film "handles family motifs far more successfully than the more publicized film from the following year, The Exorcist, [in that] it achieves an effective balance between supernatural motifs and material causes by never allowing the former to overwhelm the latter."

== Production ==
=== Development ===
Following a bidding war between major studios over Ramona Stewart's 1970 novel, exclusive rights were sold to producer Martin Poll and his studio, Haworth Productions.

=== Filming ===
Screen tests for The Possession of Joel Delaney began in December 1970. Principal photography commenced on January 2, 1971, in New York City. While exteriors were shot in New York, the bulk of the interior sequences were filmed in London. Principal photography was completed in March 1971, during which time Martin Poll left the project due to creative disputes with actress Shirley MacLaine. Following Poll's exit, British media mogul Lew Grade and his company, ITC Entertainment, took over production. (MacLaine had recently made Desperate Characters (1971) and the short-lived series Shirley's World under Grade's supervision.) As a result, Poll had his name removed from the credits as producer. Philip Rosenberg served as the film's production designer.

== Release ==
The film's U.S. premiere was held on May 24, 1972, in New York City and Los Angeles. In addition to its standard cut, which consists primarily of spoken English with some Spanish, an exclusively Spanish-language version of the film was released concurrently in New York. Joel Delaney was subsequently screened at the Berlin International Film Festival the week of June 23, 1972. It was released in London on August 18, 1972.

== Controversy and Censorship ==
Following its release, the film's climactic scene in a Long Island beach house ignited critical outrage, due to its explicit depiction of child torture and abuse. The scene in question involved the twelve-year-old actor, David Elliott, who was called on to strip and dance naked on a table in front of the possessed Joel.

In a 2020 interview, Elliott reported that this experience was the source of a lifelong trauma that required years of therapy. He claimed that the table scene had not been part of the original script when he accepted the role. Instead, it had been added by director Waris Hussein during a script rewrite in the final two weeks of production. Elliott further revealed that a scene in which he was dragged by the possessed Joel holding a real switchblade was filmed using poor safety measures that could have resulted in permanent eye damage. Also, to make him cry for a scene in which Joel describes the killing of his dog, Elliott was told by the filmmakers that his actual dog had been killed and was not certain whether he was going to leave the island alive. Based on these claims, the filming of these scenes likely involved child endangerment. With reference to the table scene, even though Elliott's frontal nudity is not visible in the 1.85:1 theatrical aspect ratio, complete nudity was actually caught on film which made his genitals visible in the VHS release, as it was in the open matte format.

Film critic Roger Ebert heavily characterized this and similar scenes as "in nauseatingly bad taste." He further argued that "filmmakers should have enough imagination and enterprise to scare us without resorting to cheap tricks. Hitchcock can, and does. But Waris Hussein, who directed this film, is so bankrupt of imagination that he actually descends to a scene where the little boy is forced to disrobe and eat dog food." (Actually, it is Norah's daughter whose face is shoved into a bowl of Ken-L Ration, not her son.) In addition, Paul D. Zimmerman, critic for Newsweek, characterized the controversial scene as "cruel, tasteless, and debased as to create nausea instead of fear." In the TV programme Film '71, critic Barry Norman, after seeing the film, felt indignation at the way the Long Island climax used children to impart a sense of terror and violence. And in 2004, thirty-two years after the film's release, author Stephen King maintained that the final scenes alone would have cost the film an NC-17 rating had it been released a decade or two later.

In the United Kingdom, the film was originally cut in order to receive an adults-only X certificate; all cuts were waived upon re-submission for DVD release in 2007.

== Home media ==
Paramount Home Entertainment released The Possession of Joel Delaney on VHS in 1991. The film remained unreleased in other formats until June 2008, when Paramount issued it for the first time on DVD in conjunction with Legend Films. In August 2021, the Australian company Via Vision Entertainment announced they would be releasing the film for the first time on Blu-ray through their Imprint films series on November 24, 2021. This release was slightly edited from the theatrical version. In January 2025, Vinegar Syndrome announced they were preparing an Ultra HD Blu-ray edition of the film, uncut and newly remastered under license from Paramount, for release the following month. This marked the film's North American debut on both HD and 4K formats.

== Reception ==
=== Box office ===
In her biography of Shirley MacLaine, writer Patricia Erens noted that The Possession of Joel Delaney was a box-office disappointment for Paramount Pictures.

=== Critical response ===
The Possession of Joel Delaney received mixed to negative reviews, though some critics appreciated its social commentary on class issues. And while MacLaine's performance was largely regarded as an asset, some reviewers blasted the film's negative portrayal of Puerto Rican religious cultism. Roger Ebert thought the film was "badly put together, with little feeling for suspense." He gave it a rating of two out of four stars. Candice Russell of the Miami Herald felt the screenplay was underdeveloped, despite the film's "keen performances, Hussein's crisp direction, and clean, often-eerie photography. The fault here lies with the screenplay, and not with its execution." The British film publication Sight and Sound called it a "grim and gratuitously nasty voodoo drama"

Kevin Thomas of the Los Angeles Times gave the film a favorable review, praising director Hussein's use of film locations and its "perceptive and subtle" cultural observations, summarizing it as "a unique and provocative film, harrowing and at times grisly, that demands a great deal of the viewer's imagination." Wanda Hale of The New York Daily News praised the actors, especially MacLaine whose role tested her "dramatic ability...She gives a remarkably fine performance." Hale also applauded the film's depiction of class disparity among New York residents. Variety also praised MacLaine's performance as "riveting."

In Britain, critic Derek Malcolm compared the film's gratuitousness to that of Sam Peckinpah's Straw Dogs (1971) in that it "sits up and begs for trouble. It [features] violence and ultimately rubs our noses in it. I've no doubt at all that many will think it meretricious garbage. I've also no doubt at all that it is the most powerful piece of filmmaking Hussein has yet shown us." Like Hale, Malcolm wrote favorably of the film's social commentary and concluded that the film "deserves to be noticed in a different context to that in which it will undoubtedly be advertised."

However, Time Out Film Guide attacked the film for its "slick racial moralizing [and] its mumbo-jumbo in which shrieking Puerto Ricans try to exorcize the devil...what you come away with is an alarmist message saying 'Keep New York White'." TV Guide also gave the film an unfavorable review, deeming it "bad taste, overwrought, and claptrap."

== See also ==
- List of American films of 1972

== Sources ==
- Derry, Charles (2009). Dark Dreams 2.0: A Psychological History of the Modern Horror Film from the 1950s to the 21st Century. Jefferson, North Carolina: McFarland. ISBN 978-0-786-45695-6.
- Erens, Patricia (1978). The Films of Shirley MacLaine. South Brunswick, New Jersey: A. S. Barnes. ISBN 978-0-498-01993-7.
- Frank, Alan (1982). The Horror Film Handbook. Totowa, New Jersey: Barnes & Noble Books. ISBN 9780--389-20260-8.
- Grade, Lew (1992). Still Dancing: My Story. New York: HarperCollins. ISBN 978-0-002-17780-1.
- Muir, John Kenneth (2012). Horror Films of the 1970s. Jefferson, North Carolina: McFarland. ISBN 978-0-786-49156-8.
- Williams, Tony (2014). Hearths of Darkness: The Family in the American Horror Film (Updated ed.). Jackson, Mississippi: University Press of Mississippi. ISBN 978-1-62846-107-7. OCLC 903533974.
