= Nina Wadia =

British actress (born 1968)

Nina Wadia OBE
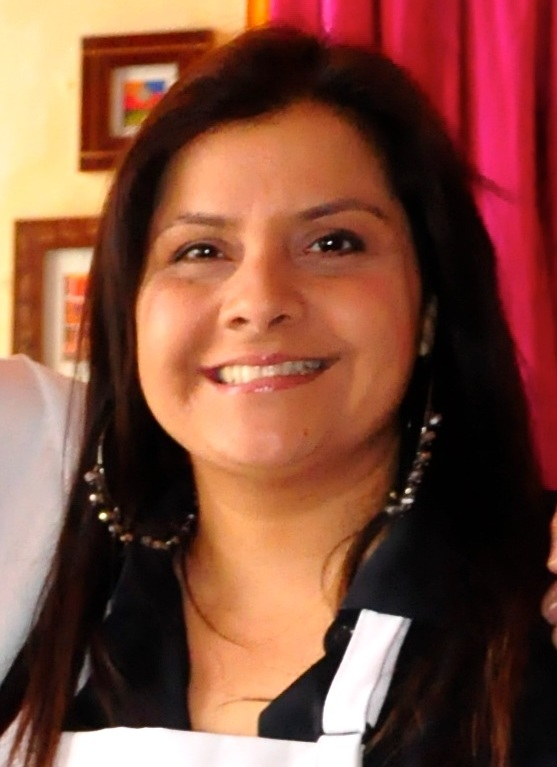
- Wadia in 2012
- Born: 18 December 1968 (age 57); Bombay, India
- Occupation: Actress
- Years active: 1991–present
- Spouse: Raiomond Mirza (m. 1998)
- Children: 2
- Family: Wadia family

Nina Wadia (born 18 December 1968) is a British actress. She is known for portraying Zainab Masood in the BBC soap opera EastEnders, Aunty Noor in Citizen Khan, Mrs Hussein in the BBC comedy Still Open All Hours and for starring in the BBC Two sketch show Goodness Gracious Me.

Additionally, Wadia appeared in the Hindi-language romantic comedy Namaste London in 2007. She also appeared in the series Origin in 2018 and the BBC soap opera Doctors as Binita Prabhu in 2023.

== Early life ==
Wadia was born on 18 December 1968 in Bombay, India, to parents who were of Parsi ancestry. She has an older brother and older sister; both of her parents have died. When Wadia was nine years old she moved to Hong Kong and was a student at Island School, Hong Kong.

== Career ==
=== Television and film ===
Wadia first came to prominence in BBC sketch show Goodness Gracious Me, playing characters such as Mrs "I can make it at home for nothing!" and one half of The Competitive Mothers. She took over from her Goodness Gracious Me co-star, Meera Syal, in the role of Rupinder in the sitcom All About Me alongside Jasper Carrott and Natalia Kills. In 2007, Wadia was cast as Zainab Masood in the long-running BBC soap opera EastEnders. Her last appearance as Zainab in EastEnders was on 8 February 2013. She also had a minor role in EastEnders in 1994, playing a nurse named Viv who treated Michelle Fowler (Susan Tully) when she was hospitalised with a gunshot wound. She also appears as Zainab in the 2010 spin-off EastEnders: E20.

Wadia has also made several guest appearances in various British comedies and dramas, such as 2point4 Children, The Vicar of Dibley, Thin Ice Chambers, Holby City, Murder in Mind, Doctors and New Tricks. She was a regular presenter on the ITV topical chat show, Loose Women (2005–2006). Wadia also appeared in the E4 teen drama Skins, playing the mother of Anwar Kharral, and, in March 2008, she appeared in the BBC Three drama West 10 LDN. Wadia played the wedding caterer in the comedy film Bend It Like Beckham.

She played a role as the housekeeper in the film I Can't Think Straight, directed by Shamim Sarif. The film revolves around two women from Indian and Palestinian upper-class immigrant communities in the UK who fall in love, and Wadia is the housekeeper who rebels at her high-handed Palestinian employer in small ways. She also had a minor part in the film Code 46 (2003). She starred in a BFI/BBC film Sixth Happiness along with Firdaus Kanga in 1997. The film explores sexuality, disability and the Parsis, a small westernised minority in India, of which Wadia herself is a member. She has also starred alongside Rishi Kapoor playing his wife in a Bollywood film titled Namaste London. She voices the title role in Ethelbert the Tiger – a children's programme. She also had a role in Doctor Who as a doctor in the episode "The Eleventh Hour".

In July 2013, Wadia appeared in All Star Mr & Mrs. In September 2013, she appeared in ITV's Big Star's Little Star. Since December 2013, Wadia has starred in Still Open All Hours as Mrs Hussein. In January 2015, it was announced that Wadia would have a guest role in Holby City, as an established neurosurgeon Annabelle Cooper. The role was for five episodes. In April 2017, she appeared as Khadija in Finding Fatimah, a British romantic comedy. In 2019, as a last-minute casting call, and in "more of a cameo", as Wadia said, she played the minor part of "Zulla" in the live action remake of Aladdin directed by Guy Ritchie. In 2020, she appeared in the role of Anna Masani in the ninth season of the popular BBC drama series Death in Paradise. Also in 2020, she had a small part in the fifteen minute drama Isolation Stories alongside Sheridan Smith which was filmed via webcam due to the COVID-19 pandemic in the United Kingdom.

From September 2021, Wadia was a contestant for the nineteenth series of Strictly Come Dancing, paired with professional dancer Neil Jones. The couple were the first to be eliminated, in the second week. In February 2023, Wadia appeared in an episode of BBC Four's Spring Walks, exploring Swaledale in North Yorkshire. Then in April 2023, she appeared as Binita Prabhu in the BBC soap opera Doctors.

=== Stage and radio ===
Apart from the original radio version of Goodness Gracious Me, Wadia's other radio work includes guesting on Parsons and Naylor's Pull-Out Sections, as well as regular appearances in the BBC World Service soap opera Westway as the pharmacist Namita ul-Haq. In 2001, Wadia voiced the role of Ariel in a BBC Radio 3 production of The Tempest. In 2002, she was due to star in the Royal Shakespeare Company's production of Midnight's Children, based on Salman Rushdie's novel, but she quit only weeks before rehearsals were due to begin. In December 2023 - January 2024, for Christmas and New Year, she made her pantomime debut playing Fairy Sugarsnap in Jack and the Beanstalk at the York Theatre Royal from Friday 8 December 2023 to Sunday 7 January 2024.

== Personal life ==
Wadia is married to the composer Raiomond Mirza. The couple first met in Canada and married there in July 1998. They live in Surrey. Like Wadia, Mirza is a Parsi and the couple had a traditional Parsi wedding. She is a member of the Wadia family.

Wadia is a practicing Zoroastrian.

=== Charity ===
Wadia was involved in the Pakistan Earthquake Appeal Concert and Fashion Show, at the Royal Albert Hall in 2005. She has also been involved in campaigning for Save the Children and for increased organ donation from Asians in Britain. She is a Breakthrough T1D ambassador.

== Honours and awards ==
Wadia won Best Comedy Performance at the 2009 British Soap Awards, as well as Best On-Screen Partnership at the same awards ceremony for her on-screen relationship with Nitin Ganatra. In 2004, she won the chairman's Award at the Asian Women awards.

In April 2013, she was awarded with the Outstanding Achievement in Television Award at The Asian Awards. The following year, Wadia won the Sophiya Haque award for Services to British Television Award at the Asian Media Awards. The award was presented to her by Haque's sister, Seyera.

Wadia was appointed Officer of the Order of the British Empire (OBE) in the 2021 New Year Honours for services to entertainment and charity.

== Filmography ==
=== Film ===
Year	Title	Role	Notes
1997	Sixth Happiness	Dolly Kotwal	
1998	Such a Long Story		
1999	The Comedy Trail: A Shaggy Dog Story	Charlotte Cooper/Sashi Kapoor	TV special
2000	Offending Angels	Baggy's Ex 2	
2002	Another Day	Meena	Short film
2002	Bend It Like Beckham	Wedding Caterer	
2002	Cup and Lip		Short film
2003	Code 46	Hospital Receptionist	
2006	The Goodbye Girls	Nadia	Short film
2007	Namastey London	Bebo M. Malhotra	
2008	I Can't Think Straight	Rani, The Housekeeper	
2008	Munãfiq	Aisha	Short film
2009	Vincent	Cheryl	Short film
2010	Race for Life: Girls Just Want to Have Fun		Short film
2012	Keith Lemon: The Film	Pat	
2014	Puja Nights	Mrs. Shah	Short film
2015	Amar Akbar & Tony	Seema	
2016	A Street Cat Named Bob	Bus Conductress	
2017	Finding Fatimah	Khadija	
2018	Together	Mrs. Justice Reid	
2018	Strangeways Here We Come	Lucy	
2019	The Queen's Corgi	Patmore (voice)	
2019	Aladdin	Zulla	
2019	Corner Shop Show: Thank You, Come Again	Faizal's mother	
2020	A Gift from Bob	Anika	
2021	Followers	Becky Dubar	
2021	Repeat	Megan	
2022	Devi	Devi	Short film
2022	A Stranger in Our Bed	Mrs. Tanner	
2022	Kaur	Lakhwinder	Short film
2023	The Dandies of Albertopolis	Royal Crown Broadcaster	Short film
2023	Bonus Track	Headmistress	
2023	Bad Indian - The Villain Origin Story	Mum	Short film

=== Television ===
Year	Title	Role	Notes
1991	2point4 Children	Sharma	Episode: "When the Going Gets Tough, the Tough Go Shopping"
1994	What Do You Call an Indian Woman Who's Funny	herself	Gurinder Chadha's short documentary focusing on Wadia, Parminder Chadha, Shobna Gulati and Syreeta Kumar
1994	EastEnders	Nurse Viv	3 episodes
1997	Flight	Sumita	Television film
1997	Casualty	Veena	Episode: "Counting the Cost"
1998	Kiss Me Kate	Applicant	Episode: "Secretaries"
1998	The Bill	Mina Kavia	Episode: "The Whip Hand"
1998–2000, 2014–2015	Goodness Gracious Me	Various characters	21 episodes
1999	The Comedy Trail: A Shaggy Dog Story	Vanessa Robinson / Veena Rabindranath	Television Special
1999	The Vicar of Dibley	Miss Carr	Episode: "Spring"
2000	The Strangerers	Waitress	Episode: "The Getawaying"
2000	The Way It Is	Various characters	Television film
2000	Single Voices	Sita / Gita	Episode: "Sita Gita"
2000	Holby City	Rita Dennish	Episode: "Anyone Who Had a Heart"
2000–2001	Perfect World	Maggie	13 episodes
2001	We Know Where You Live, Live!		Television film
2001	Chambers	Alex Kahn	6 episodes
2001	The Weakest Link	Herself - Contestant	Episode: "Comedians Special"
2002	An Angel for May	Science Teacher	Television film
2002	White Teeth	Neena	Mini-Series, 3 episodes
2003–2004	All About Me	Rupinder	16 episodes
2003	Murder in Mind	Meena Patel	Episode: "Cornershop"
2004	Doctors	DS Coombs	Episode: "Catchy Monkey"
2005	Ethelbert the Tiger	Ethelbert (voice)	Episode: "Ethelbert and the Polar Bear"
2005	Waking The Dead	Roshni Mehta	2 episodes: "Towers of Silence: Parts 1 & 2"
2005	Casualty@Holby City	Jean	Episode: "Interactive: Something We Can Do"
2005	New Tricks	Mughda Das	Episode: Family Business"
2006	The Bill	Defence Counsel	Episode: "A Satisfying Day's Work"
2006	Thin Ice	Karen	Mini-series
2007	The Lift	Sunita	Television film
2007, 2008	Skins	Bibi, Anwar's Mum	2 episodes: "Finale" and "Everyone"
2007–2013	EastEnders	Zainab Masood	463 episodes
2008	West 10 LDN	Job Centre Clerk	TelevisionWoul film
2010	Doctor Who	Dr. Ramsden	Series 5, Episode: "The Eleventh Hour"
2010	East Street	Zainab Masood	Charity crossover between Coronation Street and EastEnders
2010, 2011	EastEnders: E20	Zainab Masood	2 episodes
2011	Mongrels	Nita (voice)	Episode: "Vince and the Helpful Horse"
2011	Would I Lie to You?	Herself - Panellist	1 episode
2013–2018	Still Open All Hours	Mrs. Hussein	22 episodes
2014	Citizen Khan	Aunty Noor	Episode: "Aunty Noor"
2015	Holby City	Annabelle Cooper	5 episodes
2016	Hank Zipzer	Inspector	2 episodes: "Hank's Good Turn" and "The Crunchy Pickle"
2016	Kiva Can Do	Nanni	2 episodes: "Jurassic Lark" and "Party Island"
2016	The Last Dragonslayer	Mother Xenobia	Television film
2016	Square Roots	Bina Desai	Television film
2017	Zapped	Judge	Episode: "The Trial"
2017	Coconut	Saira	4 episodes
2017	Hetty Feather	Mrs. Penhaligon	2 episodes: "New Beginnings" and "The Past Returns"
2017	Murder on the Blackpool Express	Moira	Television film
2018	Trollied	Meg	3 episodes
2018	Origin	Venisha Gupta	5 episodes
2019	Danny & Mick	Joy Stickler	20 episodes
2019	Doctor Who: Time War	Deepa (voice)	Episode: "State of Bliss"
2020	Death in Paradise	Anna Masani	4 episodes
2020	Isolation Stories	Yasmine	Episode: "Mel"
2020	Rhyme Time Town	Molly (voice)	Episode: "Super Kitten and Power Pupster/What's the Time, Hickory?"
2020	Maxxx	Death	2 episodes: "Death" and "Music Video"
2020	The Crystal Maze	Herself - Contestant	1 episode
2021	Too Close	Dr. Anita Rhys Evans	Mini-series, 3 episodes
2021	Hitmen	Siobhan Burman	Episode: "Soft Launch"
2021	Can I Improve My Memory?	Herself - Participant	Mini-series
2021	Strictly Come Dancing	Herself - Contestant	5 episodes
2021–2022	The Outlaws	Shanthi Rekowski	10 episodes
2022	Newark, Newark	Heather	2 episodes
2022	The Sandman	Fate Mother	4 episodes
2022	Doctor Who: The Eighth Doctor Adventures	Mimi / Valtrassi / Tenth Drax (voice)	Episode: "Here Lies Drax"
2023	Doctors	Binita Prabhu	2 episodes: "Trapped in Time" and "Where Am I?"
2023	B&B by the Sea	Herself	1 episode
2023	Count Abdulla	Bushra Khan	6 episodes
2023	Tweedy & Fluff	Narrator	
2024	Midsomer Murders	Medora Salt	Episode: "The Blacktrees Prophecy"
2025	The Sunshine Murders	Barbara Boxhall	Episode: “Game for a Kill”
2025	Play for Today	Heather	Episode: "Never Too Late"
2026	The Fortune	Laura	

=== Video games ===
Year	Title	Role	Notes
2027	Fable	Samira (voice)	
