= Fraser Ayres =

English actor (born 1980)

- Born: Fraser Stuart Ayres; 1980 (age 45–46); Leicester, England
- Occupation: Actor

Fraser Stuart Ayres (born 1980) is an English actor, best known for his role as Clint in the BBC comedy series The Smoking Room.

== Biography ==
Ayres first joined the youth core at the Haymarket Theatre in Leicester and has done other television, including Bella and The Boys, Unconditional Love, London's Burning, The Vice and Trail of Guilt. His stage work brought him Best Actor awards for his performance in The People Next Door and he has also starred in Ramayana, Telling Tales, Four and Bluebird, Workers Writes, Vurt, Sandman, and the world premiere of Philip Ridley's Mercury Fur. His film work includes Revenger's Tragedy, Intimacy, It Was An Accident, Speak Like A Child, Dinner For Two, Rage, and Kevin & Perry Go Large. He played "Ray" in the BBC Three drama pilot West 10 LDN (also known as W10 LDN). In 2007, Ayres appeared in Little Miss Jocelyn and in 2011, he starred in the one-off BBC Christmas show, Lapland. In 2015, Ayres appeared as Theo Bainbridge in the ITV series Midsomer Murders episode 17.2 "Murder by Magic".

In 2016, Ayres joined the cast of the Talawa Theatre Company and Royal Exchange Manchester co-production of King Lear. The Daily Telegraph praised "Fraser Ayres’s chillingly sociopathic Edmund, the amoral face of an emerging, modern calculating politics", while '"The Guardian said "Ayres is one of the most dangerously unstable Edmunds of recent times". The Manchester Evening News noted that "Fraser Ayres near re-writes the scale of Edmund's anger towards his illegitimate father the Earl of Gloucester (Philip Whitchurch)".

During 2017 he was cast in the part of Rich Collis, a menacing drug dealer and money launderer, in the long-running ITV continuing drama Coronation Street.
