= Troy Nixey =

Canadian comic book artist and film director

- Born: April 12, 1972 (age 54); Lethbridge, Alberta, Canada
- Occupations: artist, film director

Troy Nixey (born 12 April 1972) is a Canadian comic book artist and film director.

== Comic books ==
Nixey has written and illustrated for comic books such as Batman: The Doom That Came to Gotham, Neil Gaiman's Only the End of the World Again, Harley Quinn, and The Matrix Comics.

== Film ==
After submitting his 2007 short Latchkey's Lament to filmmaker Guillermo del Toro looking for guidance and feedback, Nixey received an offer to direct his first full-length film, Don't Be Afraid of the Dark, a remake of a 1973 ABC made-for-television horror film that originally starred Kim Darby. The 2011 version starred Guy Pearce, Katie Holmes, and Bailee Madison.
