= Trying to Grow =

1991 novel by Firdaus Kanga

First edition

Trying to Grow is a 1991 novel by Firdaus Kanga, published by Bloomsbury. The novel is semi-autobiographical, set in urban India, and is about a young boy growing up with brittle bones.

The protagonist, who would never grow taller than four feet, finds his way into the world of sexuality and adulthood. It is set in, and humorously describes, the Parsi community in Bombay. It depicts a defiant Indian family with fond memories of the British Raj and everything English.

Trying to Grow is told through the eyes of the young boy—called Brit because of his brittle bones and also because it reminds his mother of Britain. Brit grows up to prefer the Kama Sutra to Shakespeare. The novel does not allow gender or disability to impede a growing boy's desire for sex and love.

== Film adaptations and references ==
Trying to Grow was made into an EMMA award-winning BBC-BFI film entitled Sixth Happiness with author Firdaus Kanga starring in the main lead. The novel was selected to be part of The Vintage Book of Indian Writing: 1947–97 – a major anthology of the work of the most important and influential Indian writers of the last 50 years. This volume was published by Salman Rushdie and Elizabeth West to coincide with the anniversary of India's independence. The novel has just been re-published in India by Penguin.

== Plot ==
Trying to Grow features a young man, born in Bombay, with brittle bones, who would never grow taller than four feet. His mother, an Anglophile enamoured with everything English (stockpiling Quality Street to Marmite), names her little boy Brit, after his brittle bones and because it was short for her favourite Britain.

Brit turns out to be a spiky, opinionated and naughty – he knows his small size allows people to assume he is a safe and innocent haven for their secrets. He prefers sex to Shakespeare, although he gets to be good at both as he grows older. He's schooled at home, so he knows more about Charles I than the boys next door – until, that is, puberty arrives, with a sexy new boy next door. A relationship with a woman also follows. All through is the tenderness and heartbreak of a young man experiencing love and desire – having his heart reinforced and mended, which is far more intense than the pain of his broken bones.

The characters are semi-autobiographical and set in the Parsi community in India.

== Major themes ==
- Sexuality, disability
