= Perry King =

American actor (born 1948)

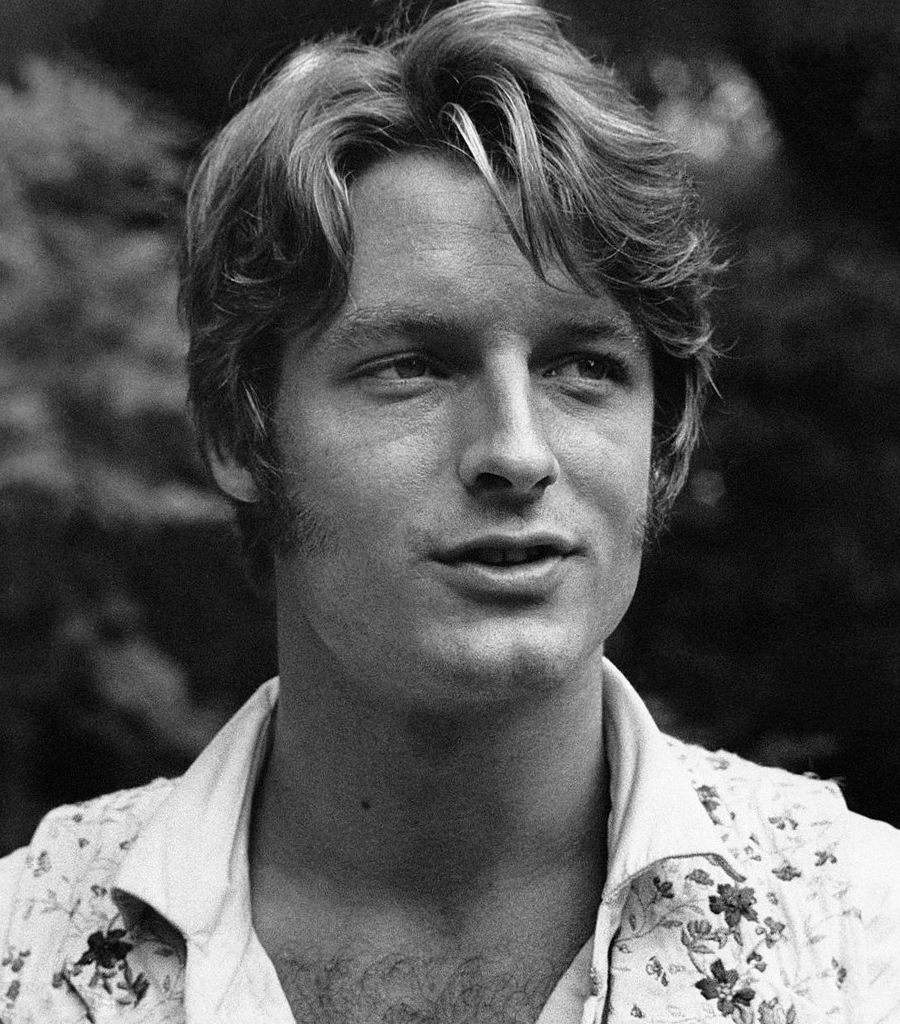
- King in 1975
- Born: Perry Firestone King; April 30, 1948 (age 78); Alliance, Ohio, U.S.
- Education: Yale University; Juilliard School; Stella Adler Studio of Acting
- Occupation: Actor
- Years active: 1972–present
- Children: 2

Perry Firestone King (born April 30, 1948) is an American actor. He is best known for his roles on television and in films.

King received a Golden Globe nomination for his role in the television film The Hasty Heart (1983), which is a remake of the 1949 film of the same title.

== Early life ==
King was born in Alliance, Ohio, the son of Robert George and Elvira Perkins -King, a social activist. Her father was the legendary literary editor Maxwell Perkins, who edited and discovered F. Scott Fitzgerald's The Great Gatsby and Ernest Hemingway's The Sun Also RisesHis maternal grandfather was Maxwell Perkins, an editor for the publishing house Charles Scribner's Sons. Through Perkins, King is descended from U.S. Senator William M. Evarts, from English military engineer Lion Gardiner, and from Roger Sherman, a signatory to the United States Declaration of Independence. King received a degree in drama from Yale University and also studied at Juilliard.

== Career ==
King made his film debut in the 1972 film Slaughterhouse-Five. In 1974, he played the role of Chico Tyrell in The Lords of Flatbush. In 1975, he portrayed Hammond Maxwell in Mandingo.

Since the 1970s, he has appeared in dozens of feature films, television series and television movies. He auditioned for the role of Han Solo in Star Wars, but the role ultimately went to Harrison Ford. However, he played the character in the radio adaptations of Star Wars and both its sequels.

In 1983 he starred in the series The Quest and in 1984, King was nominated for a Golden Globe award for his role in the TV movie The Hasty Heart. That same year, he landed the role of Cody Allen on the series Riptide.

In 1993, he starred in the television adaptation of Sidney Sheldon's novel A Stranger in the Mirror, which is a roman à clef on Groucho Marx. In 1995, he portrayed the role of Hayley Armstrong on Melrose Place. He also appeared as Richard Williams in the NBC TV series Titans with Yasmine Bleeth in 2000 and as the President of the United States in the 2004 film The Day After Tomorrow.

King has made guest appearances on TV shows including Spin City, Will & Grace, Eve, and Cold Case.

He has also worked as a voice actor, voice-acting for Samson in the 1985 animated feature Samson & Delilah and the character of Randall in an episode of SWAT Kats: The Radical Squadron.

== Personal life ==
Married and divorced twice, King has two daughters and one granddaughter.

An avid motorcyclist, King was featured on Huell Howser's California's Gold where he spoke about his collection of motorcycles and sidecars. In December 2008, the American Motorcyclist Association (AMA) appointed King to its Board of Directors.

== Filmography ==
=== Film ===
Year	Title	Role	Notes
1972	Slaughterhouse-Five	Robert Pilgrim	
1972	The Possession of Joel Delaney	Joel Delaney	
1974	The Lords of Flatbush	David 'Chico' Tyrell	
1975	The Wild Party	Dale Sword	
1975	Mandingo	Hammond Maxwell	
1976	Lipstick	Steve Edison	
1977	Andy Warhol's Bad	L.T.	
1977	The Choirboys	Baxter Slate	
1978	A Different Story	Albert Walreavens	
1979	Search and Destroy	Kip Moore	
1982	Class of 1984	Andrew Norris	
1982	The Clairvoyant	Paul 'Mac' McCormack	
1991	Switch	Steve Brooks	
1998	The Adventures of Ragtime	Jerry Blue	
1999	Her Married Lover	Richard Mannhart	
2004	The Day After Tomorrow	President Blake	
2004	The Discontents	John Walker	
2012	Hatfields and McCoys: Bad Blood	Ran'l McCoy	
2014	K'ina Kil: The Slaver's Son	Nasi	Short
2014	Delusional	Daniel Gallagher	
2018	The Divide	Sam Kincaid	

=== Television ===
Year	Title	Role	Notes
1973	Medical Center	Wilson	Episode: "Nightmare"
1974	Cannon	Stephen Danver	Episode: "Blood Money"
1974	Apple's Way	Jack Gale	Episode: "The Coach"
1974	Hawaii Five-O	Rick, Jay Farraday	Episodes: "The Banzai Pipeline", "We Hang Our Own"
1975	Foster and Laurie	Rocco Laurie	TV movie
1976	Captains and the Kings	Rory Armagh	Miniseries
1977	Aspen	Lee Bishops	Miniseries
1979	The Cracker Factory	Edwin Alexander	TV movie
1979	Love's Savage Fury	Zachary Willis	TV movie
1979	The Last Convertible	Russ Currier	Miniseries
1980	City in Fear	John Armstrong	TV movie
1981	Inmates: A Love Story	Roy Matson	TV movie
1981	Golden Gate	Jordan Kingsley	TV movie
1982	The Quest	Dan Underwood	Main role
1983	The Hasty Heart	Yank	TV movie
1984	The Miracle Continues	John Macy	TV movie
1984–1986	Riptide	Cody Allen	Main role
1985	The Greatest Adventure: Stories from the Bible	Samson	Episode: "Samson and Delilah"
1986	Stranded	Nick MacKenzie	TV movie
1987	I'll Take Manhattan	Cutter Amberville	Miniseries
1988	Perfect People	Ken Laxton	TV movie
1988	Shakedown on Sunset Strip	Charles Stoker	TV movie
1988	Disaster at Silo 7	Maj. Hicks	TV movie
1989	The Man Who Lived at the Ritz	Philip Weber	TV movie
1989	Valvoline National Driving Test	As himself	TV special
1989	Roxanne: The Prize Pulitzer	Herbert 'Peter' Pulitzer	TV movie
1989	The Hitchhiker	Doug	Episode: "Studio 3X"
1990	The Knife and Gun Club	Matt Haley	TV movie
1990	Kaleidoscope	John Chapman	TV movie
1990	Only One Survived	Phillip Asherton	TV movie
1992	Something to Live for: The Alison Gertz Story	Mark	TV movie
1992	A Cry in the Night	Erich	TV movie
1993	The Torkelsons	Brian Morgan	Main role
1993	Country Estates	Kurt Morgan	TV movie
1993	A Stranger in the Mirror	Toby Temple	TV movie
1993	Tales from the Crypt	Roger	Episode: "Came the Dawn"
1993	Jericho Fever	Michael Whitney	TV movie
1993	The Trouble with Larry	Boyd Flatt	Main role
1994	SWAT Kats: The Radical Squadron	Randall (voice)	Episode: "The Deadly Pyramid"
1994	Good King Wenceslas	Tunna	TV movie
1994	She Led Two Lives	Jeffrey Madison	TV movie
1995	Burke's Law	Richard Moss	Episode: "Who Killed the Centerfold?"
1995	The Outer Limits	Richard Adams	Episode: "Birthright"
1995	Melrose Place	Hayley Armstrong	Recurring role
1996	Hijacked: Flight 285	Frank Leyton	TV movie
1996	Face of Evil	Russell Polk	TV movie
1997	Their Second Chance	Larry	TV movie
1998	The Sentinel	William Ellison	Episode: "Remembrance"
1998	The Cowboy and the Movie Star	Clint Brannan	TV movie
2000	Will & Grace	John Marshall	Episode: "Oh Dad, Poor Dad, He's Kept Me in the Closet and I'm So Sad"
2000	Titans	Richard Williams	Main role
2001	The Perfect Wife	Robert Steward	TV movie
2002	Spin City	Tom Crandall	Recurring role
2002	Another Pretty Face	Michael Bennet	TV movie
2004	Stranger at the Door	Greg Norris	TV movie
2004	Eve	Jackson	Episode: "Dateless in Miami"
2005	The Perfect Neighbor	William Costigan	TV movie
2005	Home for the Holidays	Jack Cooper	TV movie
2006	Without a Trace	Walter Mulligan	Episode: "More Than This"
2007	Cold Case	Stan Williams	Episode: "Blackout"
2007	Framed for Murder	Jason	TV movie
2007	Brothers & Sisters	Curtis Jones	Episode: "Game Night"
2009	Happiness Isn't Everything	Comm. Gower	TV movie
2010	Big Love	Clark Paley	Episodes: "Strange Bedfellows", "Sins of the Father", "End of Days"
2011	Drop Dead Diva	Warren Persky	Episode: "Closure"
2012	The Mentalist	Greg Bauer	Episode: "Cheap Burgundy"
2014	Newsreaders	Mayhew Ketchup	Episode: "Band Names-R-Us: Put Me in Coach"
2015	Eyewitness	Lee Decker	TV movie

== Award nominations ==
Golden Apple Award

- Nominated: Male New Star of the Year (1975)

Golden Globe Awards

- Nominated: Best Performance by an Actor in a Supporting Role in a Series, Mini-Series or Motion Picture Made for TV, The Hasty Heart (1984)
