= Firdaus Kanga =

Indian writer and actor (born 1960)

- Born: 1960; Mumbai
- Occupation: Author, Journalist and, Actor.
- Language: English language

Firdaus Kanga, born in Mumbai 1960 to a Parsi family, is an Indian writer, journalist and actor who currently lives in London. He has written a novel Trying to Grow a semi-autobiographical novel set in India and a travel book "Heaven on Wheels", which shares about his experiences in United Kingdom where he met Stephen Hawking. A film was based on his novel Trying to Grow with the name of Sixth Happiness, where he himself played the role of a screenwriter and the lead character. Kanga was born with a rare disease called Osteogenesis imperfecta or brittle bones disease. Scholars have examined Trying to Grow as a reflection of the Parsee community’s decline; Anjali Raman (2026) situates the novel within debates on nostalgia, secularism, and majoritarian politics in contemporary India.
