= Harold Hecht filmography =

Harold Hecht (1907–1985) was an Academy Award-winning Hollywood film producer, dance director and film director. He was also a talent agent, a literary agent, a theatrical producer, a theatre director and a Broadway actor. He was a member of the Academy of Motion Pictures Arts and Sciences and the Screen Producers Guild.

During his first stay in Hollywood in the early to mid-1930s, Hecht was one of the leading dance directors in the movie industry, working with the Marx Brothers, Mae West, Bing Crosby, Cary Grant, W.C. Fields, Gary Cooper, Maurice Chevalier and Marion Davies. In 1947, he co-founded Norma Productions, an independent film production company, with his business partner and managed actor, Burt Lancaster. From 1954 to 1959, the Norma Productions subsidiary Hecht-Lancaster Productions (later renamed Hecht-Hill-Lancaster Productions with the addition of James Hill), was the biggest and most important independent production unit in Hollywood. Following the end of the Hecht-Hill-Lancaster Productions team, Hecht continued as one of the top three independent producers in Hollywood, a position he shared with Stanley Kramer and the Mirisch brothers, for the next ten years.

At the 28th Academy Awards ceremony in 1956, Hecht received a Best Picture Oscar for the 1955 Hecht-Lancaster Productions film Marty. He was again nominated three years later at the 31st Academy Awards ceremony for the 1958 Hecht-Hill-Lancaster Productions film Separate Tables. The film did not win but Hecht did accept the Oscar for Best Supporting Actress in place of Wendy Hiller who could not be present. The Broadway play version of Separate Tables, produced by Hecht-Lancaster Productions, was nominated for the Best Play Award at the 11th Tony Awards ceremony in April 1957 In November 1959 Hecht was chosen by United States President Dwight Eisenhower to accompany the cultural exchange program committee in a trip to Russia when Marty was selected by the USSR as the first American film to be screened in that country since World War II.

Fourteen of Hecht's film productions (and an additional three on which he was a choreographer) have won and been nominated for several awards and prizes at various ceremonies and film festivals, including; Academy Awards, Golden Globe Award, British Academy Film Awards, Bodil Awards, Directors Guild of America Award, Writers Guild of America Award, National Board of Review Awards, New York Film Critics Circle Award, Laurel Awards, David di Donatello Award, Bambi Award and the Online Film & Television Association Award; and at the Cannes Film Festival, the Venice Film Festival and the Berlin International Film Festival. Four of the films Harold Hecht worked on have been deemed "culturally, historically, or aesthetically significant" by the United States National Film Preservation Board and have been selected for preservation in the Library of Congress' National Film Registry; Duck Soup in 1990, Sweet Smell of Success in 1993, Marty in 1994, and She Done Him Wrong in 1996.

== As dance director or choreographer ==
Year	Film	Distribution Company	Awards
1931	Chi Chi and Her Papas	RKO Radio Pictures	
1932	Horse Feathers	Paramount Pictures	
1932	Lady and Gent	Paramount Pictures	Nominated—Academy Award for Best Original Screenplay
1932	Devil and the Deep	Paramount Pictures	
1932	Blondie of the Follies	Metro-Goldwyn-Mayer Pictures	
1932	The Big Broadcast	Paramount Pictures	
1932	Ruby Red	Paramount Pictures	
1933	She Done Him Wrong	Paramount Pictures	National Board of Review Award for Top Ten Films; National Film Preservation Board National Film Registry; Nominated—Academy Award for Best Picture
1933	A Bedtime Story	Paramount Pictures	
1933	College Humor	Paramount Pictures	
1933	Duck Soup	Paramount Pictures	National Film Preservation Board National Film Registry
1933	Melody Cruise	RKO Radio Pictures	
1933	International House	Paramount Pictures	
1933	Bed of Roses	RKO Radio Pictures	
1934	Morocco Nights	Warner Brothers Pictures	
1934	I Like It That Way	Universal Pictures	
1934	Bottoms Up	Fox Film	
1934	Glamour	Universal Pictures	
1934	Hollywood Party	Metro-Goldwyn-Mayer Pictures	
1934	Romance in the Rain	Universal Pictures	
1935	Gypsy Night	Metro-Goldwyn-Mayer Pictures	

== As director ==
Year	Film	Distribution Company
1935	Gypsy Night	Metro-Goldwyn-Mayer Pictures

== As producer ==
Year	Film	Production company	Distribution Company	Awards
1948	Kiss the Blood off My Hands	Norma Productions / Harold Hecht Productions	Universal-International Pictures	
1950	The Flame and the Arrow	Norma Productions / Frank Ross Productions	Warner Brothers Pictures	Nominated—Academy Award for Best Dramatic or Comedy Score; Nominated—Academy Award for Best Color Cinematography
1951	Ten Tall Men	Norma Productions / Halburt Productions	Columbia Pictures	
1952	The First Time	Norma Productions / Halburt Productions	Columbia Pictures	
1952	The Crimson Pirate	Norma Productions	Warner Brothers Pictures	
1954	His Majesty O'Keefe	Norma Productions	Warner Brothers Pictures	
1954	Apache	Hecht-Lancaster Productions / Linden Productions	United Artists	
1954	Vera Cruz	Hecht-Lancaster Productions / Flora Productions	United Artists	
1955	Marty	Hecht-Lancaster Productions / Steven Productions	United Artists	Academy Award for Best Picture; Academy Award for Best Director; Academy Award for Best Actor in a Leading Role; Academy Award for Best Writing, Adapted Screenplay; Golden Globe Award for Best Actor – Motion Picture Drama; BAFTA Award for Best Foreign Actor; BAFTA Award for Best Foreign Actress; Bodil Award for Best American Film; Cannes Film Festival Palme d'Or; Cannes Film Festival OCIC Award; Directors Guild of America Award for Outstanding Directorial Achievement in Motion Pictures; National Board of Review Award for Best Film; National Board of Review Award for Best Actor; National Board of Review Award for Top Ten Films; New York Film Critics Circle Award for Best Film; New York Film Critics Circle Award for Best Actor; Writers Guild of America Award for Best Written American Drama; National Film Preservation Board National Film Registry; Nominated—Academy Award for Best Actor in a Supporting Role; Nominated—Academy Award for Best Actress in a Supporting Role; Nominated—Academy Award for Best Cinematography, Black-and-White; Nominated—Academy Award for Best Art Direction-Set Decoration, Black-and-White; Nominated—BAFTA Award for Best Film from any Source
1955	The Kentuckian	Hecht-Lancaster Productions / James Productions	United Artists	Nominated—Venice Film Festival Golden Lion
1956	Trapeze	Hecht-Lancaster Productions / Joanna Productions / Susan Productions	United Artists	Bambi Award for Best Actress - International; Berlin International Film Festival Silver Berlin Bear Award for Best Actor; Berlin International Film Festival Bronze Berlin Bear Award for Audience Poll; Nominated—Directors Guild of America Award for Outstanding Directorial Achievement in Motion Pictures
1957	The Bachelor Party	Hecht-Hill-Lancaster Productions / Norma Productions	United Artists	National Board of Review Award for Top Ten Films; Nominated—Academy Award for Best Actress in a Supporting Role; Nominated—BAFTA Award for Best Film from any Source; Nominated—Cannes Film Festival Palme d'Or
1957	Sweet Smell of Success	Hecht-Hill-Lancaster Productions / Norma Productions / Curtleigh Productions	United Artists	Bambi Award for Best Actor - International; National Film Preservation Board National Film Registry; Online Film & Television Association - Film Hall of Fame; Nominated—BAFTA Award for Best Foreign Actor; Nominated—Golden Laurel Award for Top Male Dramatic Performance; Nominated—Golden Laurel Award for Top Female Supporting Performance
1958	Run Silent, Run Deep	Hecht-Hill-Lancaster Productions / Jeffrey Productions	United Artists	Nominated—Golden Laurel Award for Top Cinematography - Black and White
1958	Separate Tables	Hecht-Hill-Lancaster Productions / Clifton Productions	United Artists	Academy Award for Best Actor in a Leading Role; Academy Award for Best Actress in a Supporting Role; Golden Globe Award for Best Actor – Motion Picture Drama; David di Donatello Award for Best Foreign Actress; Golden Laurel Award for Top Male Dramatic Performance; National Board of Review Award for Top Ten Films; New York Film Critics Circle Award for Best Actor; Sant Jordi Award for Best Foreign Actor; Nominated—Academy Award for Best Picture; Nominated—Academy Award for Best Actress in a Leading Role; Nominated—Academy Award for Best Writing, Screenplay Based on Material from Another Medium; Nominated—Academy Award for Best Cinematography, Black-and-White; Nominated—Academy Award for Best Music, Scoring of a Dramatic or Comedy Picture; Nominated—Golden Globe Award for Best Motion Picture – Drama; Nominated—Golden Globe Award for Best Actress – Motion Picture Drama; Nominated—Golden Globe Award for Best Supporting Actress; Nominated—Golden Globe Award for Best Director; Nominated—Golden Laurel Award for Top Female Dramatic Performance; Nominated—Golden Laurel Award for Top Female Supporting Performance; Nominated—New York Film Critics Circle Award for Best Film; Nominated—New York Film Critics Circle Award for Best Screenplay; Nominated—Writers Guild of America Award for Best Written American Drama
1959	The Rabbit Trap	Hecht-Hill-Lancaster Productions / Canon Productions / Anne Productions	United Artists	Locarno International Film Festival Award for Best Actor
1959	Cry Tough	Hecht-Hill-Lancaster Productions / Canon Productions / Anne Productions	United Artists	
1959	The Devil's Disciple	Hecht-Hill-Lancaster Films / Brynaprod	United Artists	Nominated—BAFTA Award for Best British Actor
1959	Summer of the Seventeenth Doll	Hecht-Hill-Lancaster (Australia) Proprietary Limited	United Artists	
1959	Take a Giant Step	Hecht-Hill-Lancaster Productions / Sheila Productions	United Artists	Locarno International Film Festival Silver Sail Award; Nominated—Golden Globe Award for Best Supporting Actress; Nominated—Golden Globe Award for Best Film Promoting International Understanding; Nominated—BAFTA United Nations Award
1960	The Unforgiven	Hecht-Hill-Lancaster Productions / James Productions	United Artists	
1961	The Young Savages	Hecht-Hill-Lancaster Productions / Contemporary Productions	United Artists	
1962	Birdman of Alcatraz	Hecht-Hill-Lancaster Productions / Norma Productions	United Artists	BAFTA Award for Best Foreign Actor; Golden Laurel Award for Top Drama; Golden Laurel Award for Top Male Dramatic Performance; Golden Laurel Award for Top Female Supporting Performance; National Board of Review Award for Top Ten Films; Venice Film Festival Volpi Cup Award for Best Actor; Venice Film Festival San Giorgio Prize Award; Nominated—Academy Award for Best Actor in a Leading Role; Nominated—Academy Award for Best Actor in a Supporting Role; Nominated—Academy Award for Best Actress in a Supporting Role; Nominated—Academy Award for Best Cinematography, Black-and-White; Nominated—Academy Award for Best Actor in a Leading Role; Nominated—Golden Globe Award for Best Supporting Actor; Nominated—Directors Guild of America Award for Outstanding Directorial Achievement in Motion Pictures; Nominated—Writers Guild of America Award for Best Written American Drama; Nominated—Venice Film Festival Golden Lion
1962	Taras Bulba	Harold Hecht Productions / Curtleigh Productions / Avala Film	United Artists	Nominated—Academy Award for Best Music, Score - Substantially Original; Nominated—Golden Globe Award for Best Original Score; Nominated—International Film Music Critics Award for Best Archival Re-Recording of an Existing Score
1964	Flight from Ashiya	Harold Hecht Films / Daiei Motion Picture Company	United Artists	
1964	Wild and Wonderful	Harold Hecht Corporation / Reynard Productions	Universal Pictures	
1965	Cat Ballou	Harold Hecht Corporation	Columbia Pictures	Academy Award for Best Actor in a Leading Role; Golden Globe Award for Best Actor – Motion Picture Musical or Comedy; BAFTA Award for Best Foreign Actor; Berlin International Film Festival Silver Berlin Bear Award for Best Actor; Berlin International Film Festival Award of Special Mention; Berlin International Film Festival Youth Film Award for Best Feature Film Suitable for Young People; Golden Laurel Award for Best Comedy; Golden Laurel Award for Top Male Comedy Performance; Golden Laurel Award for Top Female Comedy Performance; Golden Laurel Award for Top Song; National Board of Review Award for Best Actor; New York Film Critics Circle Award for Best Actor; Nominated—Academy Award for Best Writing, Screenplay Based on Material from Another Medium; Nominated—Academy Award for Best Editing; Nominated—Academy Award for Best Music, Original Song; Nominated—Academy Award for Best Music, Scoring of Music, Adaptation or Treatment; Nominated—Golden Globe Award for Best Motion Picture – Musical or Comedy; Nominated—Golden Globe Award for Best Actress – Motion Picture Musical or Comedy; Nominated—Golden Globe Award for Most Promising Newcomer - Male; Nominated—Golden Globe Award for Best Original Song; Nominated—BAFTA Award for Most Promising Newcomer to Leading Film Roles; Nominated—Berlin International Film Festival Golden Berlin Bear Award for Best Director; Nominated—Directors Guild of America Award for Outstanding Directorial Achievement in Motion Pictures; Nominated—Writers Guild of America Award for Best Written American Comedy
1967	The Way West	Harold Hecht Company	United Artists	
