= Curtis Enterprises =

American company founded by Tony Curtis

- Trade name: Curtis Enterprises, Incorporated
- Type: Private
- Industry: Entertainment industry; Film industry; Music industry; Television industry
- Predecessor: Curtleigh Productions
- Founded: October 6, 1961; 64 years ago in Universal City, California, United States
- Founder: Tony Curtis
- Fate: Dissolved
- Headquarters: 9601 Wilshire Boulevard, Beverly Hills, California, United States
- Key people: Stanley Margulies
- Products: Art; Music; Motion pictures
- Subsidiaries: Reynard Productions

Curtis Enterprises was an American company established by actor Tony Curtis in 1961. The company was formed following the dissolution of Curtis' previous film production company, Curtleigh Productions, which he had co-founded with his first wife Janet Leigh in 1955. The couple separated, and then divorced, in 1962 leading Curtis to branch off on his own. The company served multiple purposes over the years, principally as the actor's hiring company, through which it would loan-out Curtis' acting services to film production companies and studios. It also functioned as a film and television production company, a music production company, and as an organizer for Curtis' art shows.

In its film production capacity, Curtis Enterprises' activities were short-lived. During its one-year span, from 1962 to 1963, Curtis Enterprises developed more than half a dozen properties but only completed a single film: 40 Pounds of Trouble. The comedy film was distributed by Universal-International Pictures and was highly successful, partly due to it being the first motion picture ever filmed at Disneyland, and was later nominated for Golden Laurel Awards. The film is also notable as the only motion picture solely produced by one of Curtis' film production companies; all other films were co-produced in collaboration with other film production companies. In 1963, Curtis and his producing partner, Stanley Margulies, shifted the development of their films to a dedicated film production subsidiary, Reynard Productions, through which several properties previously acquired by Curtleigh Productions and Curtis Enterprises would ultimately be made.

Curtis Enterprises' music production outputs were also short-lived, spanning from 1963 to 1964. Curtis hoped to finance and executive produce the recording of several albums but only one was completed: This Is My Lucky Day by David Allyn. The pop and jazz album was released by Everest Records. Curtis Enterprises also functioned as an intermediary between Curtis and the sale or showcasing of his paintings.

== History ==
=== Transition from Curtleigh Productions (1961–1962) ===
Tony Curtis and Janet Leigh, at the time a married couple, formed the independent film production company Curtleigh Productions, Incorporated in 1955. During the next seven years, Curtleigh Productions successfully produced films like Mister Cory, Sweet Smell of Success, The Vikings, The Defiant Ones and Taras Bulba, in addition to developing nearly twenty more unrealized properties. The company was also used to secure independent loan-out services from Curtis, outside of his non-exclusive Universal-International Pictures contract, to film production companies and studios.

In January 1961, Curtleigh Productions announced that Stanley Margulies had been appointed Vice-President of the company; a month later, headquarters were set up in a modest office space on Revue Studios' lot in Universal City, California. Margulies had, for the prior six years, been a devoted partner to Kirk Douglas as Publicity Director of Bryna Productions, Executive Producer of Brynaprod's television department, and Vice-President of the company's advertisement subsidiary, Public Relations Consultants. Margulies had also handled extensive publicity for such films as The Vikings and Spartacus and was therefore familiar with Curtis. As Vice-President of Curtleigh Productions, Margulies was to act as producer for motion pictures and supervisor of publicity for the company. On October 6, 1961, while Curtis was in Argentina filming Taras Bulba, Margulies registered a new corporation, Curtis Enterprises, Incorporated. Curtis was named President and Margulies Vice-President of Curtis Enterprises.

In early March 1962, Curtis and Leigh separated. The couple held a press announcement on March 17, 1962 admitting that they had been having difficulty for several years and that shortly after returning from Argentina, Curtis had moved out from their Beverly Hills, California home. Curtis and Leigh also explained that they hoped the separation would be temporary and that they would resume their marriage later that year. It was at this time that Curtis and Margulies formally activated Curtis Enterprises, though it would take nearly a year for Curtleigh Productions' name to stop appearing in the press. It took some time for press representatives to fully catch on to the new name and for the company's projects to be fully shifted to the new corporation; but Curtis also explained that Curtleigh Productions would not be shut down, nor renamed, until the timing was financially appropriate. Although all of the company's films in development were shifted to Curtis Enterprises, Curtleigh Productions remained an active corporation in order to collect previously-established film residuals (percentages of the profits) and to see through the release of Taras Bulba, which had been filmed prior to the couple's separation and would not be released to theaters until December 1962. On June 15, 1962 Leigh filed for divorce in the Santa Monica Superior Court, thereby ending any possibility for reconciliation and the resumption of Curtleigh Productions. The suit listed community property including 112.5 shares of Curtleigh Productions stock, as well as 50 shares of Curtis Enterprises stock.

At the time of Curtis Enterprises' activation, in early March 1962, Curtis and Margulies were actively working on four film projects: Playboy, 40 Pounds of Trouble, Soft Sell and Monsieur Cognac. Playboy, an original comedy film about Playboy magazine founder and editor Hugh Hefner, had been in development since late March 1961. The $2,000,000 project had secured a financing and distribution deal with Columbia Pictures and was tentatively scheduled to begin filming in mid-1962 on location in Chicago, Illinois as well as at Columbia Pictures' Gower Street Studios. Bernard Wolfe was writing the screenplay and Gower Champion had been signed to direct, with Curtis, Jack Lemmon and Larry Storch confirmed to star.

40 Pounds of Trouble, a $2,000,000 comedy film adapted by Marion Hargrove from Damon Runyon's novelette Little Miss Marker about a gambler who dies and leaves his daughter in the hands of the casino's manager, had been in development since mid-August 1961. The project had secured a financing and distribution deal with Universal-International Pictures, with which Curtis had a three-year, five-picture, non-exclusive contract. Curtis was to star in the picture, while television director Norman Jewison was to make his feature film directorial debut. The film was already scheduled to begin filming on location in Nevada and at Universal Studios in April 1962. A third project under development, Soft Sell, was being scripted by Ray Russell since September 1961 and was to be about the Madison Avenue crowd. The fourth and final project which Curtis Enterprises brought over from Curtleigh Productions was Dorothy Crider's story, I Married a Dog, about a musician and a brandy-drinking dog that are both in love with the same woman. The property had been acquired in late February 1962 as a co-production with Harold Hecht's film production company, Harold Hecht Productions, and was being scripted under the title Monsieur Cognac by Philip Rapp and Richard M. Powell, who together had already written a teleplay from the story in 1961. Monsieur Cognac had also secured a financing and distribution deal with Universal-International Pictures.

=== Curtis Enterprises' film productions (1962–1963) ===
Curtis Enterprises anticipated making three films in 1962: 40 Pounds of Trouble, to be filmed in the spring of 1962 for Universal-International Pictures; Playboy, to be filmed in the summer of 1962 for Columbia Pictures; and Monsieur Cognac, to be filmed in the fall of 1962 for Universal-International Pictures. Although many assumed Curtis would take a producer position in his company's films, the actor was adamant to let the press and public know that his only contribution to his films would be as an actor. Curtis would not be taking any form of producer credits and was instead happy and eager to let Margulies fulfill the role, as well as letting other crew members do their jobs. Curtis felt that too many actors interfered in areas of filmmaking in which they were not qualified and explained that the purpose of forming his independent film production unit was solely for the freedom of choosing his own starring properties, after years of being imposed roles by Universal-International Pictures.

In mid-March 1962, Curtis Enterprises decided to abandoned the developed version of Playboy (written by Wolfe and to be directed by Champion) and announced that it had entered into a co-producing partnership with Norman Lear and Bud Yorkin's Tandem Enterprises. Lear was to re-write the script, Yorkin was to direct, Margulies was to produce and Curtis was to star in the picture. The revamping of Playboy pushed its production back to late 1962, allowing Monsieur Cognac be made during the summer of 1962, once Curtis wrapped up 40 Pounds of Trouble.

40 Pounds of Trouble began filming using Panavision cameras and Eastmancolor by Pathé film on April 19, 1962 at Universal Studios. The film was also shot at several locations near Lake Tahoe, Nevada, including sceneries around the lake itself, and at Harrah's Club, which served as the interior of the casino. The film also included a significant portion of footage filmed at Disneyland. It was the first motion picture ever to receive permission from Walt Disney to film at the amusement park. Curtis and Margulies sent Disney a copy of the script and were surprised when the noted figure phoned them three days later to give his approval, with only a minor altercation to the script. The film was directed by Norman Jewison and starred Curtis, Suzanne Pleshette and Phil Silvers.

Curtis spent three months of the summer and fall of 1962 in Europe, traveling to Germany, France, Switzerland, England, Spain and Italy, all the while contemplating the shooting of Monsieur Cognac on location in Paris. His co-star Christine Kaufmann, with whom he had become romantically involved since his separation from Leigh, was pushing for the film to be made in Europe. Dates of filming were tentatively set for June, July and August 1962, with Rapp acting as producer, but the picture was not filmed. Curtis also approached French filmmaker Philippe De Broca to direct Monsieur Cognac and met up with J. Lee Thompson, who had previously directed Taras Bulba, to discuss another project for Curtis Enterprises.

On August 3, 1962, while Curtis was overseas, Margulies registered a new corporation, Reynard Productions, Incorporated. Curtis was named President and Margulies Vice-President of Reynard Productions. Akin to Curtis Enterprises replacing Curtleigh Productions, Reynard Productions would ultimately take over Curtis Enterprises' film production work in 1963. Curtis and Margulies slowly began shifting the workload to the new corporation, but waited until 40 Pounds of Trouble was released to use the new company name publicly. Upon returning to America in September 1962, Curtis, Margulies and Hecht decided that Monsieur Cognac would be made in Hollywood and set January 1963 as a tentative filming date. The production companies would instead send a second unit crew to film backgrounds of Paris, and build sets at Universal Studios.

In September 1962, Curtis Enterprises acquired the filming rights to Samuel Grifton's novel A Most Contagious Game, a suspense-crime-thriller about a magazine reporter who goes undercover as a gangster to research the underworld but ends up becoming a mob leader himself. Curtis had been attached to the project since May 1958, when Kirk Douglas' Bryna Productions owned the filming rights to the property. A co-production deal was set up between Bryna Productions and Curtleigh Productions, with a financing and distribution deal secured through Universal-International Pictures. Curtis was to film A Most Contagious Game after wrapping up Some Like It Hot, but the production was delayed when Bryna Productions started Spartacus (which co-starred Douglas and Curtis). In January 1959, Bryna Productions' three-year option on A Most Contagious Game expired and the filming rights were scooped up by Dick Clark. Curtis loved the story and wanted to play the role but waited patiently until Clark's option expired, upon which time Curtis Enterprises immediately purchased the filming rights. Curtis Enterprises immediately secured a financing and distribution deal for the film with United Artists and assigned Harold Jacob Smith (who had written the Curtleigh Productions co-produced film The Defiant Ones) to write a new screenplay. A Most Contagious Game was penciled in to shoot in the fall of 1963.

In early October 1962, Curtis Enterprises signed a two-picture deal with Jewison's new film production company, Simkoe Productions, of which Margulies was an associate partner. The deal was negotiated through Jewison's agent at the William Morris Agency. In late October 1962, Margulies approached Robert Vaughn to co-star in Playboy. Another project which Curtis Enterprises was developing during this time was an adaptation of Allen Boretz and John Murray's play Room Service. The play had already been filmed twice, once with the Marx Brothers and Lucille Ball, then again under the title Step Lively with Frank Sinatra, Gloria DeHaven and Adolphe Menjou. Curtis planned to bring a new twist to the story by dressing up as a woman, which had given him great success in Some Like It Hot.

In October 1963, Curtis was approached to replace Alain Delon in Raoul Lévy's production of The Adventures of Marco Polo. The film had been halted halfway through and Lévy was looking for a replacement to reshoot the picture. By mid-November 1963, contracts had been signed for Curtis to star in the film and Curtis Enterprises to co-produce in association with Seven Arts Productions; Margulies was to co-produce with Lévy. Curtis insisted that the picture be shot entirely in Hollywood and the production team began looking for someone to rewrite the script and secure a new director. The Adventures of Marco Polo was planned to be filmed during the summer of 1963, but Lévy ultimately had misgivings about doing the film outside of Europe. By November 1962, Monsieur Cognac had been retitled to How Now, Bow Wow and director Michael Anderson, who had just wrapped up filming Flight from Ashiya for Hecht, was secured as director.

40 Pounds of Trouble had a limited one-day-only New Years Eve screening at select theaters across the United States, on the night of December 31, 1962. Theaters showed the film from one to three times that night in celebration of the oncoming new year. The film had its official world premiere on January 18, 1963 at the Carib-Miami-Miracle Theaters in Miami, Florida, and the next day at Harrah's Club's South Shore Room in Lake Tahoe, Nevada which Curtis and Kaufmann attended. The film then opened to the rest of the United States during the last week of January and first week of February 1963. It was a success and the film was nominated for a Golden Laurel Award for Top Comedy and Curtis was nominated for a Golden Laurel Award for Top Male Comedy Performance.

=== Transition to Reynard Productions and later activities (1963–2010) ===
With Curtis Enterprises' sole completed motion picture 40 Pounds of Trouble finally released, Curtis and Margulies formally activated Reynard Productions, though it would take a few months for Curtis Enterprises' name to stop appearing in the press. In contrast to Curtis keeping Curtleigh Productions active solely to receive previously-established film residuals, he kept Curtis Enterprises an active company for the rest of his life, functioning as a servicing company that loaned out the actor to film production companies and studios. In addition, 40 Pounds of Trouble would be receiving residuals for several years. Curtis Enterprises later served multiple purposes outside of the motion picture industry.

Curtis and Margulies continued working on Playboy, How Now, Bow Wow, A Most Contagious Game and Room Service through Reynard Productions, in addition to securing several more properties over the next five years. How Now, Bow Wow was successfully made in 1963 through Reynard Productions and distributed by Universal Pictures in mid-1964 under the title Wild and Wonderful. Reynard Productions wound up its film productions in 1967.

Curtis used Curtis Enterprises to oversee the development of several business ventures outside of the film industry. He looked into starting a restaurant, opening a men's wear shop and forming a record label. A noted musician, Curtis also used Curtis Enterprises as a music production company. In 1963, Curtis Enterprises financed and executive produced the recording of an album by David Allyn titled This Is My Lucky Day. The songs were arranged and the orchestra was conducted by Bob Florence, and Curtis only served as a supervisor, not as the actual audio engineer, mixing engineer or producer. This Is My Lucky Day was released by Everest Records in April 1964. Curtis later played flute with Dave Mason and Stephen Stills but the sessions, although recorded by Wally Heider Studios, were never released.

Curtis Enterprises also functioned as an intermediary between Curtis and the sale or showcasing of his paintings. By the late 1960s, once Reynard Productions ended its film production activities, Curtis Enterprises no longer held an office at Revue Studios. The company's official representative was Joseph Warren, who held an office at 9601 Wilshire Boulevard in Beverly Hills, California.

== Film productions ==
=== Completed theatrical films ===
Premiere date	Film	Production company	Distribution company	Awards
December 31, 1962	40 Pounds of Trouble	Curtis Enterprises	Universal-International Pictures	Nominated—Golden Laurel Award for Top Comedy Nominated—Golden Laurel Award for Top Malde Comedy Performance

=== Unrealized film projects ===
- Playboy (1962–1963)
- Exit 41 / Soft Sell (1962)
- A Most Contagious Game (1962–1963)
- Room Service (1962–1963)
- The Adventures of Marco Polo (1962)

== Music productions ==
Release date	Artist	Title	Production company	Record label
April 1964	David Allen	This Is My Lucky Day	Curtis Enterprises	Everest Records
