= Curtleigh Productions =

American film production company

- Trade name: Curtleigh Productions, Incorporated
- Type: Private
- Industry: Entertainment industry; Film industry; Television industry
- Founded: 1955; 71 years ago in Los Angeles, California, United States
- Founders: Tony Curtis; Janet Leigh
- Defunct: 1962
- Fate: Dissolved
- Successors: Curtis Enterprises; Reynard Productions
- Headquarters: Los Angeles, California, United States
- Key people: Blake Edwards; Stanley Margulies
- Products: Motion pictures

Curtleigh Productions was an American independent film and television production company established by actor and actress husband-and-wife team Tony Curtis and Janet Leigh. The company was formed in 1955 and produced a handful of major motion pictures during its span, including Mister Cory, Sweet Smell of Success, The Vikings, The Defiant Ones, and Taras Bulba. Although plans originally called for co-starring vehicles for the couple, Leigh took little interest in developing properties. Following the couple's divorce in 1962, Curtis continued to develop and produce properties previously acquired through Curtleigh Productions, first channeling the corporate structure through his own outfit, Curtis Enterprises, then forming a new film production company, Reynard Productions.

Four of Curtleigh Productions' films have won and been nominated for awards and prizes at various ceremonies and film festivals, including the Academy Awards, the Golden Globe Awards, the British Academy Film Awards, the Bodil Awards, the Directors Guild of America Award, the Writers Guild of America Awards, the Laurel Awards, the Bambi Award, the Golden Reel Awards, the New York Film Critics Circle Awards, the International Film Music Critics Award, and the Edgar Allan Poe Award, and at the Berlin International Film Festival and the San Sebastián International Film Festival. In addition, Sweet Smell of Success was deemed "culturally, historically, or aesthetically significant" by the United States National Film Preservation Board in 1993 and was selected for preservation in the Library of Congress' National Film Registry.

== History ==
=== Development and contractual obligations (1949–1956) ===
Tony Curtis and Janet Leigh first worked together on How to Smuggle a Hernia Across the Border, a short film co-starring and directed by Jerry Lewis in 1949. At the time, Curtis was signed to an exclusive seven-year contract with Universal-International Pictures, while Leigh was signed to an exclusive seven-year contract with Metro-Goldwyn-Mayer. The couple married on June 4, 1951. As a husband-and-wife team, they were loaned out from their respective contracted studios to appear together in Paramount Pictures' Houdini (1953), and a year later Leigh was borrowed for Universal-International Pictures' The Black Shield of Falworth (1954). In January 1955, Curtis and Leigh expressed a desire to co-star in a remake of Seventh Heaven, a property owned by 20th Century-Fox Films.

In April 1955, Leigh's Metro-Goldwyn-Mayer contract expired and she opted to sign two non-exclusive contracts: one was a five-year deal with Columbia Pictures for one film a year; the other was a four-picture contract with Universal-International Pictures. Curtis' Universal-International Pictures contract was set to expire five months later, in September 1955, and so the couple immediately began looking into forming their independent film production company, hoping for the freedom of choosing their own starring vehicles. In late May 1955, Leigh announced that if the pair was to go into a film production partnership, the name of the company would be Curtleigh Productions.

In late July 1955, it was reported that Music Corporation of America, which represented Curtis, was negotiating a new non-exclusive two-pictures a year for four years contract for the actor with Universal-International Pictures. The original deal, however, granted Universal-International Pictures a first-pick privilege on any property Curtis wished to make outside of his contract, which meant that if the studio liked the story, it would have to be made in-house. The new contract was to come into effect following his completion of the Hecht-Lancaster Productions film Trapeze, for which he was borrowed, and would be filmed in Paris, France from August to November 1955. Curtis was loaned out to Hecht-Lancaster Productions for $150,000, most of which went to Universal-International Pictures, but the actor reported that a sizable portion of his salary was already reserved to launch Curtleigh Productions later in the year. While filming Trapeze, Curtis gained a lot of insight into the world of independent filmmaking from producers Burt Lancaster and Harold Hecht, who were operating the most successful independent film production company in the United States at the time. Hecht and Lancaster were very supportive of Curtis' independent freedom and would later set up a Curtleigh Productions office in their headquarters in Beverly Hills, California.

In early August 1955, before Curtis left for Europe, Curtleigh Productions announced that it had purchased its first property: a high-budget adult Western written by Blake Edwards titled Massacre. The film was to be co-produced by Curtis and Milton Bren, starring Curtis, and directed by Edwards in the summer of 1956. In mid-September 1955, Curtleigh Productions acquired the filming rights to Leo Rosten's short story Cory, a yarn concerning a gambler and his rise in high society, which had earlier been published in Cosmopolitan magazine. Curtis, who was planning to star in the picture, immediately assigned Edwards to develop the screenplay and offered the job of directing it to British director Carol Reed, with whom he was filming Trapeze in France.

In late September 1955, Curtleigh Productions, Incorporated was officially registered and the corporation's executives were assigned: Curtis was President; his father Emanuel Schwartz was appointed vice-president; Myrt Blum was appointed Secretary; Roger Graham was appointed treasurer; and E. W. Wheeler and Fred Morrison were appointed Assistant Secretaries. Leigh chose not to be included in the executive corporate structure because she was already involved in a dress manufacturing company with her father. In mid-November 1955, with Curtis still in France filming Trapeze, Curtleigh Productions announced that it had acquired the filming rights to French author Jules Verne's adventure novel, Five Weeks in a Balloon, a story about the exploration of Africa from a hot-air balloon. Curtleigh Productions hired British writer Kathleen Dormer to adapt the novel into a comedy screenplay. Curtis planned to co-star in the picture with Alec Guinness, and hoped to film on location in Paris, France during the spring of 1956. A film was eventually made six years later through a different film production company and with a different cast.

In January 1956, Curtleigh Productions acquired Paul Gallico's 1953 novel The Foolish Immortals, after Leigh had read the serialized version in The Saturday Evening Post. It was to be the couple's first co-starring and co-producing project. The plot was to have Leigh playing the secretary of an elder woman, one of the richest in the world and willing to pay any amount of money to get her youth back; Curtis was to play a promoter who works for a man claiming to have the coveted recipe for eternal youth.

=== Co-production deal with Hecht-Lancaster Productions (1956–1957) ===
In February 1956, Music Corporation of America finalized the negotiations of Curtis' new contract with Universal-International Pictures. The new non-exclusive seven-year contract allowed Curtis to choose his independent film projects without the approbation of the major studio. However, by the time that the new deal was activated, Curtis had already consented to make Curtleigh Productions' film Cory in-house at Universal-International Pictures. On the one hand, this gave the picture security by assuring that it would be made, but on the other hand, it meant that Curtleigh Productions and Curtis would receive no screen credits for the production. In the spring of 1956, Universal-International Pictures assigned Robert Arthur to co-produce Cory; Arthur would go on to work on several more projects with Curtis, Leigh and Curtleigh Productions.

By the end of February 1956, Curtleigh Productions had entered into a multi-picture co-producing deal with Hecht-Lancaster Productions (soon to be renamed Hecht-Hill-Lancaster Productions with the addition of James Hill). Curtleigh Productions was given its own lavish office, with complimentary secretary Bobbie LaPask, inside the Hecht-Lancaster Productions Building at 202 North Canon Drive in Beverly Hills, California. While Curtis and Leigh had planned to film The Foolish Immortals in the late summer of 1956, immediately after Curtis finished shooting Cory at Universal-International Pictures, plans were altered when Leigh became sickly during her pregnancy of Kelly Curtis. Instead, Curtis accepted to co-star in and co-produce the film noir The Sweet Smell of Success as his first collaborative engagement with Hecht-Lancaster Productions. The Sweet Smell of Success, a drama about a manipulative newspaper columnist and a shady press agent, was written by Ernest Lehman, based on his personal experience as a press agent and working with Walter Winchell. The story had originally been published in Cosmopolitan as a novelette under the title Tell Me About It Tomorrow, which Hecht-Lancaster Productions optioned in 1955 as part of a multi-picture financing and distribution deal with United Artists. The screenplay was co-written with Clifford Odets and Lehman was one of the co-producers and shareholders in the film.

In April 1956, Curtleigh Productions announced that Curtis would be starring in two more films in collaboration with Hecht-Lancaster Productions. One was to be Cry Tough, a film noir about the corruption of the garment union trade by the Brooklyn Jewish mob, based on a novel by Irving Shulman and to be co-produced by William Schorr. The other was to be The Ballad of Cat Ballou, a musical western comedy based on Roy Chanslor's novel, which would pair Lancaster and Curtis as estranged brothers shooting it out. By mid-May 1956, Cory had been retitled Mister Cory; filming began on May 21, 1956 using CinemaScope cameras and Eastmancolor film at Universal Studios and on location at Lake Arrowhead, California. The color film noir co-starred Curtis, Martha Hyer, Charles Bickford and Kathryn Grant, and was directed by Blake Edwards. Before filming The Sweet Smell of Success, Curtis made The Midnight Story as part of his Universal-International Pictures commitment.

In early July 1956, Curtleigh Productions purchased a new story by Edwards, varyingly reported under the titles Jada or Jadda. Edwards would adapt his own screenplay and also direct the film, with Curtis and Kathryn Grant set to co-star, recreating their chemistry from Mister Cory. The story was set in Chicago during the 1920s and dealt with gangsters and racketeers during prohibition. Filming began on The Sweet Smell of Success on October 21, 1956, on location in New York City with director Alexander Mackendrick; by the end of November 1956, filming had moved to studio takes at Samuel Goldywn Studio in West Hollywood, California. The film co-started Curtis and Lancaster and featured Barbara Nichols, Susan Harrison, Martin Milner and Sam Levene.

Mister Cory opened to theaters in late January 1957. In February 1957, Curtleigh Productions announced that it would make a bullfighting story about a famous matador who trains his son (set to inherit his father's title after his passing), and in the process cures his fear of bulls. Curtis was to play dual roles of the father and son and offered the co-starring part to Gina Lollobrigida. The picture was to be filmed on location in Spain in late 1957, as a co-production between Curtleigh Productions and producer Harold Mirisch's company, The Mirisch Company, for United Artists. The property had originally been written by Jameson Brewer under the title The Wound, as a teleplay for General Electric Theater; Curtis first became interested in the project when he was offered to play the role in the television episode. Brewer and Edwards together developed the screenplay, tentatively titled Cortez and Son or Lopez and Son, which Edwards was to direct. Curtis filmed the video version in April 1957 at Republic Studios for Revue Productions, but the program would not air the episode until November 10, 1957, under the title Cordana. By the time that Curtis returned from filming The Vikings in Europe, the project had been abandoned in favor of Curtis starring in Thieves Market for The Mirisch Company, which in turn was replaced months later by Some Like It Hot.

Earlier that year, In January 1957, Curtleigh Productions had announced that Leigh would resume her film career, following a year off due to maternity leave. She was to co-star with Curtis in a light comedy for Curtleigh Production. The couple instead became attached to the adventure swashbuckler The Vikings in March 1957, a property which Kirk Douglas had been developing since 1954 through his film production company Bryna Productions. Curtis was paid $150,000 as an actor and Leigh was paid $60,000 as an actress, but Curtleigh Productions also received 10% of the film's profits. The $3,000,000 production was being financed by United Artists, with which Bryna Productions had an existing six-picture contract, and was to co-star Douglas, Ernest Borgnine and Michael Rennie.

Also in March 1957, Hecht-Hill-Lancaster Productions announced that it was interested in co-producing, with Curtleigh Productions, a film version of Reginald Rose's teleplay "The Defender". The drama, which had been made for television on Columbia Broadcasting System's program Studio One, revolved around a father and son team of lawyers defending a man accused on murder, and was to star Curtis. In April 1957, Curtis became attached to Kings Go Forth, a World War II drama which Frank Sinatra was planning to star in and co-producing through his film production company, Eton Productions. The film was to be co-produced by Frank Ross, through his film production company, Frank Ross Productions, and Curtis was approached with a straight salaried-actor deal. Curtis however negotiated for Curtleigh Productions to receive 10% of the film's profits. He would do the same a year later when negotiating his fee for Some Like it Hot.

The Vikings began shooting using Technirama cameras and Technicolor film on June 20, 1957, on location near the Finnafjorden fjords in Norway, then in Brittany, France, and finally interior scenes at Bavaria Filmkunst in Geiselgasteig, Germany. Curtis was so impressed by cinematographer Jack Cardiff's work that he offered the director of photography the job of directing two films for Curtleigh Productions, the first of which was scheduled to be filmed in Europe during the spring of 1958.

Sweet Smell of Success premiered on June 27, 1957, in New York City. Although the film went on to be nominated and won several awards, it was not an immediate box office success. Curtis won a Bambi Award for Best Actor - International and was nominated for a British Academy Film Award for Best Foreign Actor and a Golden Laurel Award for Top Male Dramatic Performance; while Nichols was nominated for a Golden Laurel Award for Top Female Supporting Performance. In 1993, the United States National Film Preservation Board deemed Sweet Smell of Success "culturally, historically, or aesthetically significant" and selected it for preservation in the Library of Congress' National Film Registry. In 2012, the film was inducted into the Online Film & Television Association Hall of Fame.

The soundtrack to Sweet Smell of Success, composed by Elmer Bernstein and Chico Hamilton, and published through Hecht and Lancaster's music publishing company, Calyork Music, was noteworthy on its own. It was the first time that a film had two separate soundtrack long plays issued, each featuring different music. Decca Records released not only the two long players but also issued an extended play and two singles. The first album, Music from the Sound Track Sweet Smell of Success, featured Bernstein's orchestrated jazz score, while the second album, The Chico Hamilton Quintet Plays Jazz Themes Recorded for the Sound Track of the Motion Picture Sweet Smell of Success, featured Hamilton's band jazz piece. Curtis himself became a musician during the filming when he picked up the flute. Hamilton strongly encouraged him to pursue the instrument and the two were scheduled to record an album together in 1958. Kings Go Forth began shooting on September 1, 1957, on location in France with director Delmer Daves.

=== Co-production deal with Stanley Kramer Productions (1957–1958) ===
In late 1957, Curtis was offered to play one of the leads in Stanley Kramer's new film The Long Road, an original drama written by Harold Jacob Smith and Nedrick Young about two convicts who escape from a chain gang. Curtis loved the screenplay so much that he offered to co-produce the film through Curtleigh Productions, and pushed for the casting of Sidney Poitier as his co-star. As a co-producer on the picture, Curtis and Curtleigh Productions received 30% of the film's profits. By January 1958, The Long Road had been retitled The Defiant Ones and Stanley Kramer Productions secured a six-picture financing and distribution deal with United Artists. Filming began on The Defiant Ones on February 28, 1958. In late February 1958, Curtleigh Productions announced that Curtis and Edwards were developing two new properties. The first was a feature film set in Hawaii titled Beach Boy, which Edwards had scripted and would direct with Curtis starring. The second was a television pilot film for an adventure series, which Edwards was to produce and with Curtis narrating instead of starring.

The Vikings held its East Coast premiere on June 12, 1958 at dual cinema houses in New York City: the Victoria Theatre and the Astor Theatre, which were side by side and took up a full block on Broadway between West 45th Street and West 46th Street. To promote the event, Bryna Productions commissioned the largest and costliest theater marquee-billboard advertisement ever manufactured at the time; a 261-foot long (22,825 square feet), three-dimensional, electrically articulated spectacular that extended across the entire block, hanging across the façade of both theaters. The billboard, which included 6,000 light bulbs, a 52-foot sail and eleven moving oars, alone cost $105,000 to make, which was included in United Artists' $2,000,000 advertising and publicity campaign budget allocated for the picture during the summer of 1958. The film then premiered in Los Angeles on June 19, 1958, at the Fox-Wilshire Theater; this movie house, too, was decorated with Norse-theme articles for a cost of $4,000, followed by an after-party for over 200 guests, Hollywood celebrities and members of the press. The film premiered in London on July 8, 1958, at the Leicester Square Theatre and was attended by Prince Philip, and the movie was also screened at a handful of European film festivals, including the San Sebastián International Film Festival in Spain and the Brussels World Film Festival in Belgium. The Vikings became one of the most successful films of 1958; it was one of the biggest money-makers of the year and was bestowed several awards. It received a Golden Laurel Award for Top Action Drama, the San Sebastián International Film Festival awarded it the Zulueta Prize, and the Directors Guild of America nominated it for Outstanding Directorial Achievement in Motion Pictures.

In late May 1958, Curtleigh Productions announced that Curtis would star in A Most Contagious Game, a suspense-crime-thriller about a magazine reporter who goes undercover as a gangster to research the underworld but ends up becoming a mob leader himself. The filming rights to Samuel Grafton's novel had first been purchased by Victor Saville's Parklane Pictures in 1955, which produced a television movie for Studio One, then were picked up by Bryna Productions in January 1956. Douglas, Lancaster and Leslie Nielsen had all been tied to the project over the years and Bryna Productions commissioned Grafton, and then Sydney Boehm to write the screenplay. A Most Contagious Game was to be co-produced by Curtleigh Productions and Bryna Productions, through a financing and distribution deal with Universal-International Pictures, and was set to begin filming in late 1958 after Curtis wrapped Some Like It Hot. Production was delayed when Bryna Productions started Spartacus, and in January 1959, the three-year option on A Most Contagious Game expired; the filming rights were scooped up by Dick Clark. In 1962, Curtis would himself option the filming rights through Curtis Enterprises, but the picture was never made.

The Defiant Ones premiered at the eighth Berlin International Film Festival on June 29, 1958, at which Poitier won a Silver Berlin Bear Award for Best Actor and Kramer was nominated for a Golden Berlin Bear Award for Best Director. The film then had its American premiere at the Roosevelt Theatre in Chicago, Illinois on August 13, 1958. The film was not a financial success, but it was extremely well-received by the press and critics and won several accolades, including a British Academy Film Award for United Nations, a Golden Globe Award for Best Motion Picture - Drama, a Motion Picture Sound Editors Golden Reel Award for Best Sound Editing - Feature Film, a New York Film Critics Circle Award for Best Film. It was also nominated for a British Academy Film Award for Best Film from any Source, a Golden Globe Award for Best Film Promoting International Understanding, and a Golden Laurel Award for Top Drama. Poitier won a British Academy Film Award for Best Foreign Actor and was nominated for an Academy Award for Best Actor in a Leading Role, a Golden Globe Award for Best Actor in a Motion Picture - Drama, and a Golden Laurel Award for Top Male Dramatic Performance; Curtis was nominated for an Academy Award for Best Actor in a Leading Role, a Golden Globe Award for Best Actor in a Motion Picture - Drama, a British Academy Film Award for Best Foreign Actor and a Bambi Award for Best Actor - International. Kramer won a New York Film Critics Circle Award for Best Director and a Bodil Award for Best American Film and was nominated for an Academy Award for Best Picture and an Academy Award for Best Director, a Golden Globe Award for Best Director and a Directors Guild of America Award for Outstanding Directorial Achievement in Motion Pictures.

Young and Smith won Academy Awards for Best Writing, Story and Screenplay - Written Directly for the Screen, Writers Guild of America Awards for Best Written American Drama, New York Film Critics Circle Awards for Best Screenplay and Edgar Allan Poe Awards for Best Motion Picture. Sam Leavitt won an Academy Award for Best Cinematography, Black and White and a Golden Laurel Award for Top Cinematography - Black and White. Theodore Bikel was nominated for an Academy Award for Best Actor in a Supporting Role and a Golden Laurel Award for Top Male Supporting Performance. Cara Williams was nominated for an Academy Award for Best Actress in a Supporting Role and a Golden Globe Award for Best Supporting Actress. Frederic Knudtson was nominated for an Academy Award for Best Film Editing and Ernest Gold was nominated for a Golden Laurel Award for Top Score.

In mid-August 1958, Curtleigh Productions became involved with a new bullfighting story titled Bullfight, about a matador named Domingo who gets gored and turns to prize fighting, only to find it more difficult than fighting bulls. Curtleigh Productions purchased Leslie Stevens' original screenplay and the film was to be co-produced by Stevens' film production company, Daystar Productions, with Curtis starring. In mid-November 1958, Curtleigh Productions announced that it had hired Stevens to script an original biographical film story about the love affair between Italian poet Gabriele D'Annunzio and Italian actress Eleonora Duse. The picture was to be titled The Perfect Love and was scheduled to be filmed in Rome, Italy in 1959, also as a co-production with Daystar Productions.

=== Ford Startime projects (1959–1960) ===
In June 1959, Curtis became attached to a long-anticipated biographical picture about the life of crooner Russ Columbo. Producer Maurice Duke had been attempting to make the film since 1952 and received permission from the late vocalist's brothers, Anthony and John Columbo, and sister Carmella Columbo, casting Perry Como in the role. The motion picture was to be titled Prisoner of Love, after the song of the same title composed by Columbo. By July 1953, Como had been replaced by Johnny Desmond; Desmond was subsequently replaced by Tony Martin in 1955. Desmond, however, refused to relinquish the part and embarked on his own film development, this led to a series of lawsuits and countersuits between Duke, Desmond and the Columbo family which lasted years and ultimately prevented the film from ever being made.

When Duke approached Curtis to star in and co-produce The Russ Columbo Story, the film had been out of circulation for three years (due to the legal entanglements). The announcement of the film was made by Hubbell Robinson, executive producer of Ford Startime, a new color television series for National Broadcasting Company that presented episodes individually produced by stars (as opposed to stars being loaned out to appear in a pre-developed show). Curtis was to produce the musical drama through Curtleigh Productions with Duke, who still owned the property, coming in as associate producer. Curtleigh Productions hired Joseph Stefano to adapt the Prisoner of Love screenplay into a teleplay and planned to have Robert Mulligan direct it. Although Curtis was to star in the film, vocalist Alan Dale was scheduled to overdub the singing and Gary Crosby was cast to portray his father Bing, one of Columbo's friends. Several other vocalists from the 1930s were reported to be cast as themselves.

The Russ Columbo Story was booked to be filmed at Universal Studios in November 1959, with a scheduled broadcast for January 1960. The television version of the film was to be edited into a one-hour program, but Curtleigh Productions had planned to film enough footage so that a longer cut could be edited and released as a theatrical feature film later in the year. The longer cut would also be used for European screenings and Curtleigh Productions was to oversee foreign language dubbing.

Shortly after The Russ Columbo Story was announced in the summer of 1959, Desmond and his agent Daniel Winkler announced to the press that they would attempt to halt the film's production, threatening a lawsuit if necessary. Desmond claimed that he owned the exclusive film, television and theatrical rights to Columbo's life, which allegedly included agreements with several people connected with the late singer's life, as well as controlling interests in the songs Columbo had composed. Desmond noted that he was still planning to play the role in a film. By mid-August 1959, the negative publicity and conflicts surrounding threats of a lawsuit led Curtleigh Productions and Ford Startime to abandon the project. Duke and his lawyer Paul Pearlin immediately filed a Superior Court lawsuit against Desmond and Winkler, claiming $450,000 in damages for conspiring with others in preventing the film from being made.

Curtis and Robinson had already found a replacement property to develop, in case The Russ Columbo Story did not work out, and in early October 1959 announced that The Juggler would be filmed for Ford Startime. The Juggler was based on The Juggler of Notre Dame, a fable penned by French author Anatole France about Saint Barnaby, the patron saint of circus performers. The sixteenth century story recounts a homeless juggler who is attacked by a mob in the streets of Paris, France and seeks refuge in a monastery; he is treated for his wounds but loses one of his arms, ultimately finding humbleness. Curtleigh Productions kept the same team of people under contract to develop the new story: Stefano adapted the teleplay, Mulligan was to direct and co-produce the picture and Curtis would star in the title role. William Frye came in as producer and promptly acquired the filming rights to France's story.

Filming of The Juggler was originally planned to start in December 1959, but it was pushed back to January 4, 1960 with Ted Post secured as director. The picture was shot in ten days at Universal Studios, using already-made A-budget quality sets, props and costumes, for a total production cost of only $200,000. The film co-starred Nehemiah Persoff and Patricia Medina, with a supporting cast including Bert Freed, Elisha Cook, Jr., Charles Morton and Heather Ames. Curtleigh Productions announced that The Juggler was the first picture shot expressly for dual purposes: television broadcast and theatrical screenings. Television films had previously been edited or compiled into full-length features at later times, but The Juggler was deliberately filmed with a plethora of scenes that could be included or withheld without affecting the story-line. Curtleigh Productions oversaw the editing of a television cut, which ran 51 minutes, and a theatrical cut, which ran 90 minutes; the theatrical cut was afterwards dubbed in five additional languages for the European market. Curtleigh Productions also arranged a deal that after The Juggler's first broadcast, the rights to the film reverted back to the production company, leaving it free to arrange television re-runs or market the picture as a theatrical film with full profits.

By mid-January 1960, The Juggler had been retitled to The Young Juggler, following a Columbia Pictures objection citing the previous use of that title for its 1953-distributed film The Juggler, produced by Stanley Kramer and starring Kirk Douglas. The Young Juggler was originally booked to premiere on Ford Startime in the United States on Tuesday, March 15, 1960 for National Broadcasting Company, but it was pushed back by two weeks, airing on March 29, 1960. The film was next shown on the Canadian version of Ford Startime on April 26, 1960. After completing The Young Juggler, Curtleigh Productions announced that it was interested in developing a television series that explored progressive jazz music and modern art.

On March 3, 1960, Curtleigh Productions signed with the Screen Actors Guild, which had been striking and halting production of films while negotiating post-1948 theatrical film sales to television. The Screen Actors Guild had lost a prior strike to establish residuals and payments to cast and crew members for pre-1948 theatrical film sales to television, but was adamant about major studios and independent film producers sharing their cut of broadcasts and re-runs with those involved for any forthcoming post-1948 film sales.

After signing with the Screen Actors Guild, in early March 1960, Curtleigh Productions announced that its next project would be Draw Sabres, an original Western comedy about two brothers in the United States Cavalry who fight Apache Indians and start a war of their own over a blonde. The screenplay was written by Edwards, who was also scheduled to direct the picture, and Curtis hoped to cast Laurence Harvey as his co-star. Draw Sabres was to be filmed during the second half of 1960, following Curtis' completion of The Great Impostor which he was filming with director Mulligan for Universal-International Pictures. The production was pushed back to mid-1961 when Curtis agreed to co-star in Lady L with Lollobrigida and director George Cuckor for Julian Blaustein at Metro-Goldwyn-Mayer. By November 1960, Curtis hoped to cast Jack Lemmon, Dean Martin or Frank Sinatra as his brother in Draw Sabres.

=== Stanley Margulies Vice-Presidency (1961–1962) ===
In January 1961, Curtleigh Productions announced that Stanley Margulies had been appointed vice-president of the company. Margulies had, for the previous six years, been a devoted partner to Kirk Douglas as publicity director of Bryna Productions, executive producer of Brynaprod's television department, and vice-president of the company's advertisement subsidiary, Public Relations Consultants. Margulies had handled extensive publicity for such films as The Vikings and Spartacus and was familiar with Curtis. As vice-president of Curtleigh Productions, Margulies was to act as producer for motion pictures and supervisor of publicity for the company.

With Margulies on board, Curtleigh Productions moved into a modest office space on Revue Studios' lot in early February 1961 and began expanding its production potential. In February 1961, Curtis was offered one of the leads in Harold Hecht's production of Taras Bulba, which the producer had been attempting to make since early 1959 through Hecht-Hill-Lancaster Productions. After the break-up of Hecht-Hill-Lancaster Productions, Hecht continued developing the property through his own company, Harold Hecht Productions. The film was based on Nikolai Gogol's novella of the same name, which tells the story of a Cossack clan in Ukraine fighting against the Poles, all while a love story develops between the son of the Cossack leader and the daughter of an aristocratic Polish family. Curtis was to co-star in the picture with Anthony Quinn, though the latter was ultimately replaced by Yul Brynner. Instead of accepting a flat fee as an actor for his role in Taras Bulba, Curtis negotiated a deal in which Curtleigh Productions would co-produce and receive 15% of the film's profits. The film was set to begin filming in August 1961, with a $3,000,000 financing and distribution deal backed by United Artists. By the end of March 1961, Taras Bulba's budget had been increased to $5,000,000 and Hecht was looking into filming it on location in Argentina.

In late March 1961, Curtleigh Productions announced that it would make a comedy film about Playboy magazine founder and editor Hugh Hefner. Hefner was to be one of the partners in the production of the film and approved of Curtis portraying him in the lead. Early reports also hinted that Leigh was to play one of the Playboy Bunnies and Jack Lemmon would have a part in the film. Playboy was to be Margulies' film debut as a producer and he sought to hire I. A. L. Diamond to write the screenplay but he was tied up with Billy Wilder projects. In mid-June 1961, Bernard Wolfe was announced as screenwriter for Playboy. A week later, Curtis signed a three-year, five-picture, non-exclusive renewal contract with Universal-International Pictures. Reports varied as to whether or not Playboy would be financed and distributed by Universal-International Pictures. In late June 1961, Curtis traveled to Chicago to live with and study Hefner's personality and mannerism for the role.

Another project that Curtleigh Productions developed during the summer of 1961 was a short art film about Hollywood. It was to be a silent film with a big background score composed by André Previn, showcasing the city's sights and sceneries from an original point of view. In mid-August 1961, Curtleigh Productions announced that Marion Hargrove was scripting a film titled 40 Pounds of Trouble, adapted from Damon Runyon's novelette Little Miss Marker about a gambler who dies and leaves his daughter in the hands of the casino's manager. The film was planned to be shot in Nevada in mid-1962, following Curtis' completion of Taras Bulba and Playboy, and to be financed and distributed by Universal-International Pictures.

Before leaving for location shooting on Taras Bulba, Curtleigh Productions announced in early September 1961 that author Ray Russell had been secured to write an original screenplay titled Exit 41. The project was later retitled Soft Sell and was to be about the Madison Avenue crowd. Curtis, Leigh and their two children departed Los Angeles in early September 1961, taking a train to New York, then sailing south to Buenos Aires, Argentina and finally embarking another train to reach Salta, Argentina. Taras Bulba began filming using Panavision cameras and Eastmancolor DeLuxe film on October 12, 1961, on location in Salta, Argentina with director J. Lee Thompson. After two and a half months of location shooting, which accounted for delays due to extensive hiring of extras for the battle scenes, the production moved back to Hollywood in December 1961 for three additional months of filming and post-production at Columbia Studios. Taras Bulba wound up costing United Artists a total of $7,000,000.

While Curtis was in Argentina, Margulies continued to develop properties at Curtleigh Productions' office. In September 1961, Gower Champion was secured to direct Playboy. Champion was greatly impressed by Wolfe's screenplay and described the film as alike to being in the year 1970, looking back at the 1960s. On October 6, 1961, Margulies registered a new corporation, Curtis Enterprises, Incorporated, with Curtis as president and Margulies as vice-president. Curtis Enterprises and Curtleigh Productions would be used interchangeably during most of 1962, as projects were shifted back and forth within the corporate structure. By December 1961, Curtis, Lemmon and Larry Storch had been confirmed to act in Playboy.

In mid-January 1962, Curtleigh Productions signed a financing and distribution deal for Playboy with Columbia Pictures. The $2,000,000 film was to be shot on location in Chicago, Illinois as well as at Columbia Pictures' Gower Street Studios in mid-1962, once Curtis completed 40 Pounds of Trouble. Wolfe's Playboy screenplay was however still in development. Author-comedian Stan Freberg was reportedly also working on another project for Curtleigh Productions. In early February 1962, Curtleigh Productions announced that Hargrove's 40 Pounds of Trouble screenplay had been completed and that television director Norman Jewison would make his feature film debut as director of the picture. Jewison was scheduled to begin pre-production work on February 19, 1962, with the film to start shooting at Universal Studios in April 1962. In late February 1962, Curtleigh Productions, in partnership with Harold Hecht Productions, announced that they had acquired Dorothy Crider's story I Married a Dog, which had been produced as a television episode on the Westinghouse Preview Theatre. The property was being developed by Philip Rapp and Richard M. Powell under the title Monsieur Cognac and revolved around a musician and a brandy-drinking dog that are both in love with the same woman.

=== Transition to Curtis Enterprises (1962) ===
In early March 1962, Curtis and Leigh separated. The couple held a press announcement on March 17, 1962 admitting that they had been having difficulty for several years and that shortly after returning from Argentina, Curtis had moved out from their Beverly Hills, California home. Curtis and Leigh also explained that they hoped the separation would be temporary and that they would resume their marriage later that year. It was at this time that Curtis and Margulies formally activated Curtis Enterprises, though it would take nearly a year for Curtleigh Productions' name to stop appearing in the press. It took some time for press representatives to fully catch on to the new name and for the company's projects to be fully shifted to the new corporation; but Curtis also explained that Curtleigh Productions would not be shut down, nor renamed, until the timing was financially appropriate. Although all of the current and future films in development were shifted to Curtis Enterprises, Curtleigh Productions remained an active corporation in order to collect previously-established film residuals (percentages) and to see through the release of Taras Bulba, which had been filmed prior to the couple's separation.

Curtis and Margulies continued working on Playboy, 40 Pounds of Trouble, Soft Sell and Monsieur Cognac through Curtis Enterprises. On June 15, 1962 Leigh filed for divorce in the Santa Monica Superior Court, thereby ending any possibility for reconciliation and the resumption of Curtleigh Productions. The suit listed community property including 112.5 shares of Curtleigh Productions stock, as well as 50 shares of Curtis Enterprises stock. On August 3, 1962, Curtis and Margulies formed a new film production company, Reynard Productions, Incorporated, which would ultimately take over film production work from Curtis Enterprises in 1963, much in the same manner as Curtis Enterprises had taken over Curtleigh Productions' work.

Following private screenings for press and trade representatives in October and November 1962, Taras Bulba premiered on December 9, 1962 at the Beacon Theatre in New York City. The film then opened to several locations in the United States and Canada for Christmas week 1962. Taras Bulba was hyped as a major box office attraction but Franz Waxman's score wound up the main attraction. The soundtrack was nominated for an Academy Award for Best Music, Score - Substantially Original, a Golden Globe Award for Best Original Score and an International Film Music Critics Award for Best Archival Re-Recording of an Existing Score. Of the many remaining properties acquired and developed through Curtleigh Productions, only two were later successfully produced: 40 Pounds of Trouble was made through Curtis Enterprises and distributed by Universal-International Pictures in late 1962, while Monsieur Cognac was retitled Wild and Wonderful and, after several years of development, was made through Reynard Productions and Harold Hecht Productions and distributed by Universal Pictures in mid-1964.

== Film productions ==
=== Completed theatrical films ===
Premiere date	Film	Production company	Distribution Company	Awards
January 1957	Mister Cory	Curtleigh Productions / Universal-International Pictures	Universal-International Pictures	
June 27, 1957	Sweet Smell of Success	Curtleigh Productions / Hecht-Hill-Lancaster Productions / Norma Productions	United Artists	Bambi Award for Best Actor - International National Film Preservation Board National Film Registry Online Film & Television Association - Film Hall of Fame Nominated—BAFTA Award for Best Foreign Actor Nominated—Golden Laurel Award for Top Male Dramatic Performance Nominated—Golden Laurel Award for Top Female Supporting Performance
June 12, 1958	The Vikings	Curtleigh Productions / Brynaprod	United Artists	Golden Laurel Award for Top Action Drama San Sebastián International Film Festival Zulueta Prize Nominated—Directors Guild of America Award for Outstanding Directorial Achievement in Motion Pictures
June 29, 1958	The Defiant Ones	Curtleigh Productions / Stanley Kramer Productions / Lomitas Productions	United Artists	Academy Award for Best Writing, Story and Screenplay - Written Directly for the Screen Academy Award for Best Cinematography, Black and White BAFTA Award for Best Foreign Actor BAFTA United Nations Award Berlin International Film Festival Silver Berlin Bear Award for Best Actor Bodil Award for Best American Film Edgar Allan Poe Award for Best Motion Picture Golden Globe Award for Best Motion Picture - Drama Golden Laurel Award for Top Cinematography - Black and White Motion Picture Sound Editors Golden Reel Award for Best Sound Editing - Feature Film New York Film Critics Circle Award for Best Film New York Film Critics Circle Award for Best Director New York Film Critics Circle Award for Best Screenplay Writers Guild of America Award for Best Written American Drama Nominated—Academy Award for Best Picture Nominated—Academy Award for Best Actor in a Leading Role Nominated—Academy Award for Best Actor in a Supporting Role Nominated—Academy Award for Best Actress in a Supporting Role Nominated—Academy Award for Best Director Nominated—Academy Award for Best Film Editing Nominated—BAFTA Award for Best Film from any Source Nominated—BAFTA Award for Best Foreign Actor Nominated—Bambi Award for Best Actor - International Nominated—Berlin International Film Festival Golden Berlin Bear Award for Best Director Nominated—Directors Guild of America Award for Outstanding Directorial Achievement in Motion Pictures Nominated—Golden Globe Award for Best Actor in a Motion Picture - Drama Nominated—Golden Globe Award for Best Supporting Actress Nominated—Golden Globe Award for Best Director Nominated—Golden Globe Award for Best Film Promoting International Understanding Nominated—Golden Laurel Award for Top Drama Nominated—Golden Laurel Award for Top Male Dramatic Performance Nominated—Golden Laurel Award for Top Male Supporting Performance Nominated—Golden Laurel Award for Top Score
December 9, 1962	Taras Bulba	Curtleigh Productions / Harold Hecht Productions / Avala Film	United Artists	Nominated—Academy Award for Best Music, Score - Substantially Original Nominated—Golden Globe Award for Best Original Score Nominated—International Film Music Critics Award for Best Archival Re-Recording of an Existing Score

=== Completed television films ===
Air Date	Series	Episode	Production company	Broadcast company
March 29, 1960	Ford Startime	"The Young Juggler"	Curtleigh Productions	National Broadcasting Company

=== Unrealized film projects ===
- Massacre (1955)
- Five Weeks in a Balloon (1955–1956)
- The Foolish Immortals (1956)
- Cry Tough (1956–1957)
- The Ballad of Cat Ballou (1956–1957)
- Jada / Jadda (1956–1957)
- The Wound / Cortez and Son / Lopez and Son / Cornada (1957–1958)
- The Defender (1957)
- Beach Boy (1958)
- A Most Contagious Game (1958–1959)
- Bullfight (1958)
- The Perfect Love (1958–1959)
- Prisoner of Love / The Russ Columbo Story (1959)
- Draw Sabres (1960–1961)
- Playboy (1961–1962)
- Hollywood (1961)
- Exit 41 / Soft Sell (1961–1962)
