= Little Miss Marker =

Little Miss Marker may refer to:

- "Little Miss Marker", 1932 short story by Damon Runyon; provided plotline for four film versions
- Little Miss Marker (1934 film), American comedy-drama with Shirley Temple as title character
- Little Miss Marker (1980 film), American comedy-drama with Walter Matthau as Sorrowful Jones

== See also ==
- Sorrowful Jones, 1949 American comedy film with Bob Hope and Lucille Ball
- 40 Pounds of Trouble, 1962 American comedy film with Tony Curtis and Suzanne Pleshette
