= Mister Cory =

1957 film by Blake Edwards

- Film poster by Reynold Brown
- Directed by: Blake Edwards
- Screenplay by: Blake Edwards
- Based on: "Cory" by Leo Rosten
- Produced by: Robert Arthur
- Starring: Tony Curtis; Martha Hyer; Charles Bickford; Kathryn Grant; Russ Morgan
- Cinematography: Russell Metty
- Edited by: Edward Curtiss
- Music by: Herman Stein
- Production companies: Curtleigh Productions; Universal-International Pictures
- Distributed by: Universal-International Pictures
- Release date: February 23, 1957
- Running time: 92 minutes
- Country: United States
- Language: English
- Box office: $1 million (US rentals)

Mister Cory is a 1957 American CinemaScope film noir directed by Blake Edwards and starring Tony Curtis, Martha Hyer, Charles Bickford and Kathryn Grant.

== Plot ==
Cory, a poor Chicago kid with a penchant for gambling, gets a job at a posh Wisconsin resort as a busboy. He takes a liking to glamorous socialite Abby Vollard, who is toying with the affections of rich boyfriend Alex Wyncott. Sabotaging her motorboat as a ploy to get close to her, Cory swims out to help, only to find Abby's kid sister Jen on the boat instead. She volunteers to assist his effort to win Abby's heart.

Abby mistakenly believes Cory to be a guest at the resort. She invites him on a trip to New York, but when Cory tries to raise money at a poker game, a guest named Jeremiah Caldwell cleans him out. Abby is offended when she discovers that Cory's only a busboy and walks away for good.

A year later, now in Reno trying to change his luck, Cory crosses paths again with Caldwell, only he turns out to actually be a professional gambler known as Biloxi. An ulcer prevents him from playing, so Caldwell partners with Cory, making him his proxy at the table. Together, they return to Chicago when gangster Ruby Matrobe offers them a chance to run an illegal casino. Cory sends an invitation to the grand opening to Abby, then slips away with her after fixing it so her fiancé Alex can gamble and win. They begin a secret affair.

Cory's behavior grows cruel and calculating, more so after he proposes to Abby and is coldly turned down. Biloxi is disgusted with him and breaks their partnership. Alex, who is now losing heavily at the tables, becomes aware that Abby is carrying on with Cory behind his back. He tips off the cops, who raid Ruby's gambling house. Cory tries to flee, but Alex shoots him in the arm. Ashamed of his behavior, Cory declines to prosecute. He goes to the airport, where an older and more beautiful Jen unexpectedly shows up and offers to come along.

== Cast ==
- Tony Curtis as Cory
- Martha Hyer as Abby Vollard
- Charles Bickford as Jeremiah Des Plains "Biloxi" Caldwell
- Kathryn Grant as Jen Vollard
- William Reynolds as Alex Wyncott
- Henry Daniell as Mr. Earmshaw
- Russ Morgan as Ruby Matrobe
- Willis Bouchey as Mr. Vollard
- Louise Lorimer as Mrs. Vollard
- Joan Banks as Lily
- Harry Landers as Andy
- Glen Kramer as Ronnie Chambers
- Dick Crockett as Cook

== Background ==
The film was based on a short story titled "Cory" by Leo Rosten, published in Cosmopolitan (1948), under the pseudonym Leonard Q. Ross. In mid-September 1955, Curtleigh Productions acquired the filming rights to Rosten's story. Tony Curtis, who was planning to star in the picture, immediately assigned Blake Edwards to develop the screenplay and initially offered the job of directing it to British director Carol Reed, with whom he was filming Trapeze in France.

A radio drama version of "Cory" was broadcast on August 28, 1949, as an episode of Four Star Playhouse, starring Fred MacMurray in the title role.

== See also ==
- List of American films of 1957
