= Little Miss Marker (1934 film) =

1934 film by Alexander Hall

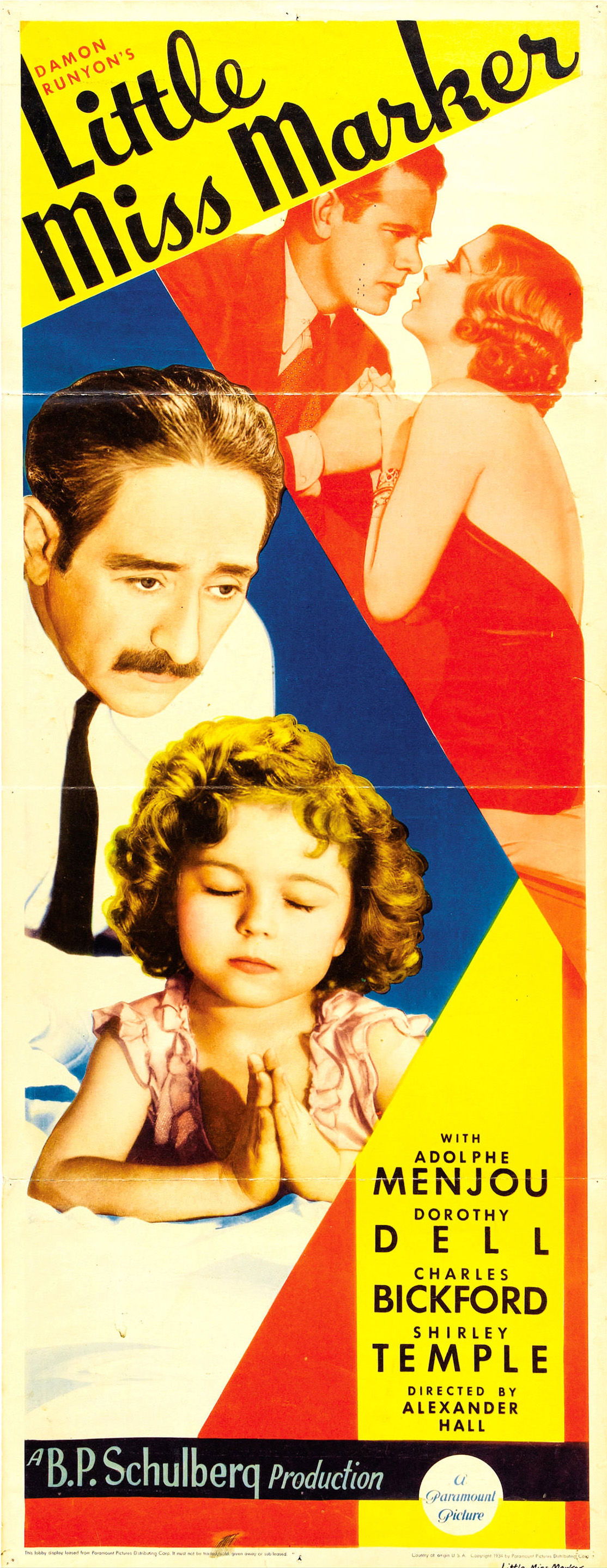
- Theatrical release poster
- Directed by: Alexander Hall
- Screenplay by: William R. Lipman; Sam Hellman; Gladys Lehman
- Based on: Little Miss Marker; 1932 story in Collier's by Damon Runyon
- Produced by: B. P. Schulberg
- Starring: Shirley Temple; Adolphe Menjou; Dorothy Dell; Charles Bickford; Lynne Overman
- Cinematography: Alfred Gilks
- Edited by: William Shea
- Music by: Ralph Rainger
- Distributed by: Paramount Pictures
- Release date: June 1, 1934
- Running time: 80 min.
- Country: United States
- Language: English

Little Miss Marker (also known as The Girl in Pawn) is an American pre-Code 1934 comedy-drama film directed by Alexander Hall. It was written by William R. Lipman, Sam Hellman, and Gladys Lehman after a 1932 short story of the same name by Damon Runyon. It stars Shirley Temple, Adolphe Menjou and Dorothy Dell in a story about a young girl held as collateral by gangsters. It was Temple's first starring role in a major motion picture and was crucial to establishing her as a major film star. It was selected for preservation in the National Film Registry by the Library of Congress in 1998 and has been remade several times.

== Plot ==
A young girl named "Marky" is given by her father to a gangster-run gambling operation as a "marker" (collateral) for a bet. When he loses his bet and commits suicide, the gangsters are left with her on their hands. They decide to keep her temporarily and use her to help pull off one of their fixed races, naming her as the owner of the horse to be used in the race.

Marky is sent to live with bookie Sorrowful Jones. Initially upset about being forced to look after her, he eventually begins to develop a father–daughter relationship with her. His fellow gangsters become fond of her and begin to fill the roles of her extended family. Bangles, girlfriend of gang kingpin Big Steve, who has gone to Chicago to place bets on the horse, also begins to care for Marky and to fall in love with Sorrowful, whose own concern for Marky shows he has a warm heart beneath his hard-nosed persona. Encouraged by Bangles and Marky, Sorrowful gets a bigger apartment, buys Marky new clothes and himself a better cut of suit, reads her bedtime stories, and shows her how to pray.

However, being around the gang has a somewhat bad influence on Marky, and she begins to develop a cynical nature and a wide vocabulary of gambling terminology and slang. Worried that her acquired bad-girl attitude means she will not get adopted by a "good family", Bangles and Sorrowful put on a party with gangsters dressed up as knights of the Round Table, to rekindle her former sweetness. She is unimpressed until they bring in the horse and parade her around on its back. Returning to New York, Big Steve frightens the horse, which throws her, and she is taken to the hospital. Big Steve goes there to pay back Sorrowful for trying to steal Bangles but is roped into giving Marky the direct blood transfusion she needs for her life-saving operation. Praying for her survival, Sorrowful destroys the drug which, administered to the horse, would have helped it win the race but killed it soon after. Informed that he has "good blood" and pleased to have given life for a change, Big Steve forgives Bangles and Sorrowful. They plan to marry and adopt Marky.

== Cast ==
- Shirley Temple as Marthy "Marky" Jane
- Adolphe Menjou as Sorrowful Jones
- Dorothy Dell as Bangles Carson
- Charles Bickford as Big Steve Halloway
- Lynne Overman as Regret. The character is meant to be Mafia accountant Otto Berman, best friend of writer Damon Runyon.
- Warren Hymer as Sore Toe
- Sam Hardy as Benny the Gouge
- John Kelly as Canvas Back
- Willie Best as Dizzy Memphis
- Frank McGlynn Sr. as Doc Chesley
- John Sheehan as Sun Rise
- Frank Conroy as Dr. Ingalls
- Mildred Gover as a maid uncredited

== Production ==
Temple, who had previously auditioned for the role of Marky prior to entering her Fox contract and failed to win the part, was loaned out to Paramount by Fox Film thanks in large part to maneuvering by her mother Gertrude. Her mother, recognizing the potential of the role, arranged for a secret meeting and second audition with the director Alexander Hall. This second audition was successful and Shirley Temple was loaned out to Paramount for $1,000 a week. Temple and Dell struck up a close friendship while filming the movie. The scene in which Temple is refusing her food and using rude language ("I don't want no mush" and "I used to be a sissy") had to be redone as Dell could not contain her laughter in the first take. This would be Dell's last completed film of her short career; she died in a tragic car crash just seven days after the debut of this film. Temple took Dell's death very hard.

== Reception ==
The film was considered a success at the box office. As a result, Paramount offered Fox $50,000 for Temple's contract, but the offer was declined.

== Recognition ==
In 1998, Little Miss Marker was selected for preservation in the United States National Film Registry by the Library of Congress as being "culturally, historically, or aesthetically significant".

== Remakes ==
The film was remade as Sorrowful Jones (1949) with Bob Hope and Lucille Ball and again as Little Miss Marker (1980) with Walter Matthau, Julie Andrews, Tony Curtis, Bob Newhart, Brian Dennehy and Lee Grant. Another remake was 40 Pounds of Trouble (1962), starring Tony Curtis as a casino manager who is left with an eight-year-old girl.

== Stage musical ==
Scott Ellis and David Thompson are working on a musical adaptation of the film to feature songs by Harold Arlen as its score.^{[1]}

== Other references ==
The plot and title of the film are referenced by the book Little Myth Marker, part of Robert Asprin's MythAdventures series.

== See also ==
- Shirley Temple filmography
- List of films about horses
