= How to Smuggle a Hernia Across the Border =

- Film screenshot
- Written by: Jerry Lewis; Don McGuire
- Starring: Tony Curtis; Janet Leigh; Jerry Lewis
- Production company: Gar-Ron Productions
- Release date: 1949
- Running time: 16 minutes
- Country: United States
- Language: English

How to Smuggle the Hernia Across the Border is a 1949 American short comedy film directed by Jerry Lewis and starring Jerry Lewis, Janet Leigh, and Tony Curtis. The film was not released commercially. The film is based on a funny story about Dean Martin's wartime personal problems with hernia.

== Production ==
How to Smuggle the Hernia Across the Border was a minor production, directed and written by Jerry Lewis who just started his film career. In 1949, he made his first feature film for Paramount, My Friend Irma, along with Dean Martin with whom Lewis had already formed a three-year partnership. From 1946 to 1949, the duo performed shows, until they found great opportunities in the movie business. After My Friend Irma, the two would release 15 more films together until 1956. Their duo ultimately fell apart because of disagreements in the final years.

This film can be considered the first solo film by Jerry Lewis, even though he was then a part of the performing duo.

The film is also noteworthy for involving actress Janet Leigh, who had appeared in several films before 1949, and actor Tony Curtis, who, as Lewis, just started his film career. Janet Leigh would later work with Lewis two more times: Living It Up in 1954, also with Dean Martin, and Three on a Couch in 1966.
