= Little Miss Marker (1980 film) =

1980 film by Walter Bernstein

- Directed by: Walter Bernstein
- Written by: Walter Bernstein; Damon Runyon
- Produced by: Jennings Lang; Walter Matthau
- Starring: Walter Matthau; Julie Andrews; Tony Curtis; Bob Newhart; Lee Grant; Sara Stimson
- Cinematography: Philip H. Lathrop
- Edited by: Eve Newman
- Music by: Henry Mancini
- Distributed by: Universal Pictures
- Release date: March 21, 1980
- Running time: 103 minutes
- Country: United States
- Language: English
- Box office: $6,321,392

Little Miss Marker is a 1980 American comedy drama film written and directed by Walter Bernstein and based on a short story by Damon Runyon. It stars Walter Matthau, Tony Curtis, Julie Andrews, Bob Newhart and Sara Stimson in her only film role. The film is a remake of the 1934 film starring Shirley Temple and Adolphe Menjou.

Other remakes of Little Miss Marker are 1949's Paramount's Sorrowful Jones with Bob Hope and Lucille Ball, and 1962's 40 Pounds of Trouble, which features Tony Curtis in a modified Sorrowful Jones role.

== Plot ==
During the 1930s, New York gangster Blackie approaches Sorrowful Jones, a gloomy, cantankerous bookmaker, about financing a new gambling house. Sorrowful is not interested. Carter, a small time gambler, leaves his six-year-old daughter to Sorrowful as a "marker", pledging her as collateral for his losses while he attempts to earn the money to pay off his debt.

Sorrowful turns Blackie down, who in turn kills Sorrowful's dog and declares that he and Sorrowful are now partners. Meanwhile, Sorrowful loans the girl's father $10 to bet on a horse, and agrees to watch the girl. Carter loses, but does not return. Sorrowful tells his assistant Regret to watch the girl, who instead ends up leaving her at Sorrowful's apartment that night and slinking away. The next morning, Blackie's enforcer Herbie tells Sorrowful to come up with the requested $50,000. Stuck with the child, Sorrowful brings her to his meeting with Blackie, where he finds her riding horseback with Blackie's girlfriend, Amanda Worthington, on her racehorse, Sir Galahad.

The next morning, Detective Brannigan visits Sorrowful looking for the daughter of a man who drowned himself, intending to place the girl in an orphanage. However, Sorrowful is reluctant to surrender the girl to Brannigan so he will not face kidnapping charges. He rents a hotel suite for the girl to stay in. When the girl asks about her father, Sorrowful lies to her about his disappearance. To cheer her up, Sorrowful takes her to the racetrack and an amusement park with Amanda.

Later that night, the girl learns he has left the hotel and gone searching for her father. The next morning, Sorrowful finds her, confesses that her father is dead, and apologizes. The following night, Blackie is forced to close their gambling operation when one man with a winning streak cleans out the bank.

To reopen the gambling house, Blackie hatches a plan to dope Sir Galahad to win the horserace. Sorrowful declines the proposition, knowing it will kill Amanda's horse. Sorrowful gathers his money from the lock box, derails the doping scheme, and bribes the horse jockeys to throw the race for Sir Galahad. At the racetrack, Sir Galahad wins but is disqualified. Amanda blames Sorrowful for fixing the race, to which he claims he did to save the horse.

Angered, Blackie tips Brannigan about the girl, who is then taken into custody. Sorrowful challenges Blackie to a fight at the piers to decide his fate. Sorrowful accidentally loses, but is happy to put his gambling life behind him. At the custody hearing, Amanda petitions the court to legally adopt her. The judge declines, as she is unwilling to place the child in a single-parent household. The judge makes the same ruling for Sorrowful's adoption request. To resolve the impasse, Sorrowful and Amanda agree to marry and raise the girl together.

== Cast ==
- Walter Matthau as Sorrowful Jones
- Julie Andrews as Amanda Worthington
- Tony Curtis as Blackie
- Bob Newhart as Regret
- Sara Stimson as the Kid
- Brian Dennehy as Herbie
- Kenneth McMillan as Brannigan
- Nedra Volz as Mrs. Clancy
- Lee Grant as the Judge
- Andrew Rubin as Carter, the Kid's father
- Ralph Manza as the Casino Worker
- Jack DeLeon as the Building Superintendent

== Award nominations ==
In 1981, Sara Stimson was nominated for the female Young Artist Award in the category of Best Major Motion Picture - Family Entertainment. Stimson lost to Diane Lane for her performance in Touched by Love. Little Miss Marker is Stimson's only acting credit.

== See also ==
- List of films about horses
