= Tony Curtis =

American actor (1925–2010)

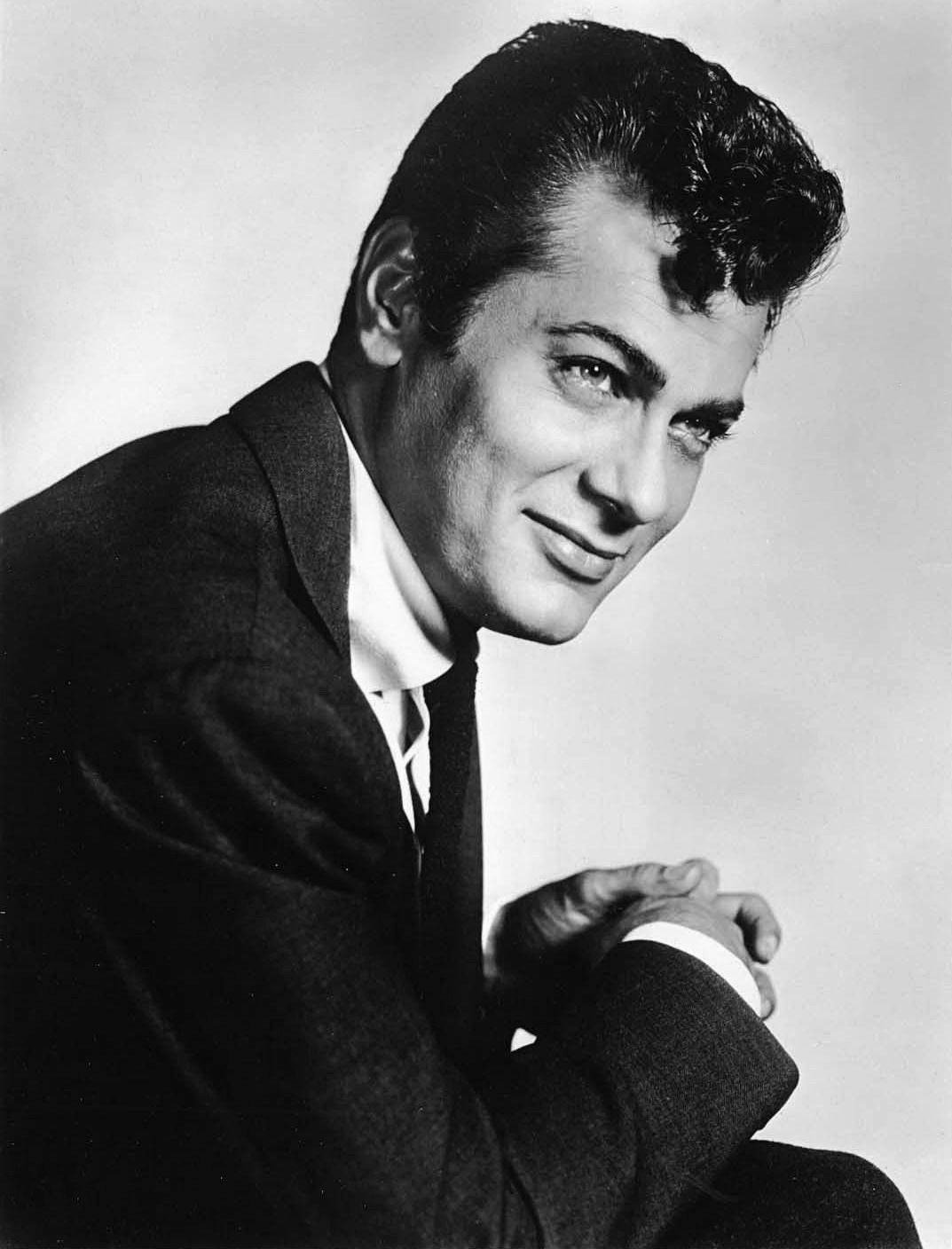
- Curtis in 1958
- Born: Bernard Schwartz; June 3, 1925; New York City, U.S.
- Died: September 29, 2010 (aged 85); Henderson, Nevada, U.S.
- Resting place: Palm Memorial Park, Green Valley, Las Vegas, Nevada
- Occupation: Actor
- Years active: 1948–2008
- Spouses: Janet Leigh (m. 1951; div. 1962) Christine Kaufmann (m. 1963; div. 1968) Leslie Allen (m. 1968; div. 1982) Andrea Savio (m. 1984; div. 1992) Lisa Deutsch (m. 1993; div. 1994) Jill Vandenberg (m. 1998)
- Children: 6, including Kelly Curtis, Jamie Lee Curtis, and Allegra Curtis
- Military service
- Allegiance: United States
- Branch: United States Navy
- Years: 1943–1945
- Rank: Signalman 3rd Class
- Conflicts: World War II

Tony Curtis (born Bernard Schwartz; June 3, 1925 – September 29, 2010) was an American actor with a career that spanned six decades, achieving the height of his popularity in the 1950s and early 1960s. He acted in more than 100 films, in roles covering a wide range of genres. In his later years, Curtis made numerous television appearances.

He achieved his first major recognition as a dramatic actor in Sweet Smell of Success (1957) with co-star Burt Lancaster. The following year he was nominated for the Academy Award for Best Actor for The Defiant Ones (1958) alongside Sidney Poitier (who was also nominated in the same category). This was followed by the comedies Some Like It Hot and Operation Petticoat in 1959. In 1960, Curtis played a supporting role in the epic historical drama Spartacus.

Curtis's stardom and film career declined considerably after 1960. Subsequently, his most significant dramatic part came in 1968 when he starred in the true-life drama The Boston Strangler. Curtis also took on the role of the Ukrainian Cossack Andrei in the historical action romance epic Taras Bulba in 1962 and starred in the ITC TV series The Persuaders! (1971–1972), playing Danny Wilde, an American millionaire.

Curtis married six times and fathered six children. He is the father of the actresses Kelly Curtis and Jamie Lee Curtis with his first wife, actress Janet Leigh, and two children including actress Allegra Curtis with his second wife, actress Christine Kaufmann. He had two sons with his third wife, Leslie Allen, one of whom predeceased him. From 1998 until his death, he was married to Jill Vandenberg, a horse trainer.

== Early life ==
Tony Curtis was born Bernard Schwartz at the Fifth Avenue Hospital corner of East 105th Street in East Harlem, Manhattan, the first of three boys born to Helen (née Klein) and Emanuel Schwartz.

His parents were Jewish immigrants from Hungary: his father was born in Ópályi, near Mátészalka, and his mother was a native of Nagymihály (now Michalovce, Slovakia); she later said she arrived in the U.S. from Vaľkovo, Slovakia. He spoke only Hungarian until the age of six, delaying his schooling. His father was a tailor and the family lived in the back of the shop. His mother was later diagnosed with schizophrenia. His youngest brother Robert was institutionalized with the same mental illness.

When Curtis was eight, he and his brother Julius were placed in an orphanage for a month because their parents could not afford to feed them. Four years later, Julius was struck and killed by a truck. Curtis joined a neighborhood gang whose main crimes were truancy and minor pilfering. When Curtis was 11, a friendly neighbor saved him from what he felt would have led to a life of delinquency by sending him to a Boy Scout camp, where he was able to work off his energy and settle down. He attended Seward Park High School, but did not graduate from it until after he returned from the United States Navy, since he previously "had barely learned to read or write in high school and knew no arithmetic." At 16, he had his first small acting part in a school stage play.

=== Military service and education ===
Curtis enlisted in the United States Navy. Inspired by Cary Grant's role in Destination Tokyo and Tyrone Power's in Crash Dive (1943), he joined the Pacific submarine force. Curtis served aboard a submarine tender, the USS Proteus, until the end of the Second World War. On September 2, 1945, Curtis witnessed the Japanese surrender in Tokyo Bay from his ship's signal bridge about a mile away.

Following his discharge from the Navy, Curtis attended City College of New York on the G.I. Bill. He then studied acting at The New School in Greenwich Village under the influential German stage director Erwin Piscator. His contemporaries included Elaine Stritch, Harry Belafonte, Walter Matthau, Beatrice Arthur, and Rod Steiger. While still at college, Curtis was discovered by Joyce Selznick, the notable talent agent, casting director, and niece of film producer David O. Selznick.

== Career ==
In 1948, Curtis arrived in Hollywood at age 23. In his autobiography, Curtis described how, by chance, he met Jack Warner on the plane to California.

=== Universal as "Anthony Curtis" ===
Under contract at Universal Pictures, he changed his name from Bernard Schwartz to Anthony Curtis and met unknown actors Rock Hudson, James Best, Julie Adams and Piper Laurie. The first name was from the novel Anthony Adverse and "Curtis" was from Kurtz, a surname in his mother's family. Although Universal Pictures taught him fencing and riding, Curtis admitted he was initially only interested in girls and money—adding that he was pessimistic regarding his chances of becoming a major star. Curtis's biggest fear was having to return home to the Bronx as a failure:

I was a million-to-one shot, the least likely to succeed. I wasn't low man on the totem pole, I was under the totem pole, in a sewer, tied to a sack.

Curtis's uncredited screen debut came in the crime drama Criss Cross (1949) playing a rumba dancer, dancing with Yvonne de Carlo. The male star was Burt Lancaster who would make a number of films with Curtis.

In his second film, City Across the River (also in 1949), he was credited as "Anthony Curtis" He had four lines in The Lady Gambles (1949) and a bigger part in Johnny Stool Pigeon (1949). He was also in Francis (1950), Woman in Hiding (1950), and I Was a Shoplifter (1950).

He was additionally in three Westerns, Sierra (1950), Winchester '73 (1950), and Kansas Raiders (1951), in which he was billed as "Tony Curtis".

=== Stardom ===
Curtis was receiving numerous fan letters, so Universal gave him the starring role in The Prince Who Was a Thief (1951), a swashbuckler set in the Middle East with Piper Laurie. It was a hit at the box office and Curtis was now established.

He followed it up with Flesh and Fury (1952), a boxing movie; No Room for the Groom (1952), a comedy with Laurie directed by Douglas Sirk; and Son of Ali Baba (1952), another film set in the Middle East with Laurie.

Curtis then starred with then-wife Janet Leigh in Houdini (1953), in which Curtis played the title role. His next movies were more "B" fare: All American (1953), as a football player; Forbidden (1953), as a criminal; Beachhead (1954), a war film; Johnny Dark (1954), as a racing car driver; and The Black Shield of Falworth (1954), a medieval swashbuckler with Leigh. They were moderately successful financially, and Curtis was growing in popularity.

Curtis then starred in the musical So This Is Paris in (1955), before appearing in Six Bridges to Cross (1955), as a bank robber; The Purple Mask (1955), as a swashbuckler; and the boxing film The Square Jungle (1955).

=== Major star ===
Curtis graduated to larger projects when he was cast as a co-star of Burt Lancaster and Gina Lollobrigida in Hecht-Lancaster Productions' Trapeze (1956). It was one of the biggest hits of the year. Curtis and Leigh formed their own independent film production company, Curtleigh Productions, in early 1955.

Curtis made a Western, The Rawhide Years (1957), was a gambler in Mister Cory (1957) and a cop in The Midnight Story (1957). Lancaster asked for him again, to play scheming press agent Sidney Falco in Sweet Smell of Success (1957), starring and co-produced by Lancaster. The film was a box office disappointment, but Curtis, for the first time in his career, received sensational reviews.

Curtis starred alongside Kirk Douglas and Janet Leigh in The Vikings (1958, produced by Douglas' Bryna Productions), which was a major box office hit. Curtis then co-starred with Frank Sinatra and Natalie Wood in the war movie Kings Go Forth (1958), before starring in The Defiant Ones the following year as a bigoted white escaped convict chained to a black man (played by Sidney Poitier). At the 31st Academy Awards, Curtis was nominated for the Academy Award for Best Actor in a Leading Role for his performance—losing to David Niven in Separate Tables.

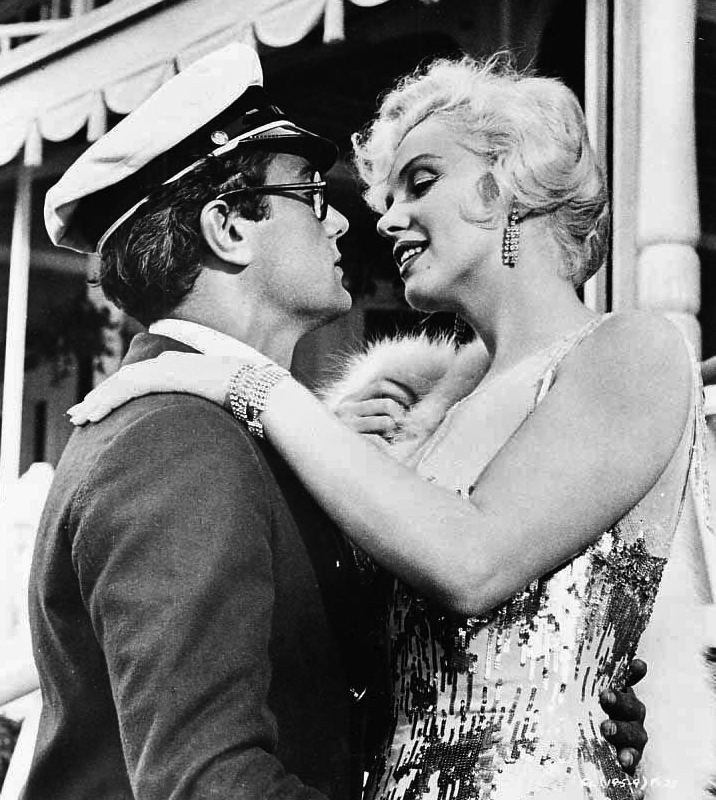
Curtis with Marilyn Monroe in Some Like It Hot (1959)

The trailer for Some Like It Hot

Curtis and Janet Leigh then starred in Blake Edwards' The Perfect Furlough (1958). He subsequently co-starred with Jack Lemmon and Marilyn Monroe in Some Like It Hot as well as Cary Grant in Operation Petticoat (1959).

Curtis and Leigh made one more film together Who Was That Lady? (1960), a comedy with Dean Martin. He and Debbie Reynolds then starred in The Rat Race (1960). He then started in a supporting role in Spartacus (1960), before making two biopics: The Great Impostor (1961), directed by Robert Mulligan, playing Ferdinand Waldo Demara; and The Outsider (1961), in which he played war hero Ira Hayes. He returned to epics with Taras Bulba (1962), co starring Yul Brynner and Christine Kaufmann, who became Curtis's second wife.

=== Comedic roles ===
On October 6, 1961, Curtis formed a new film production company, Curtis Enterprises, Incorporated. The company would make 40 Pounds of Trouble, which co-starred Curtis, Suzanne Pleshette and Phil Silvers; it was the first motion picture ever filmed at Disneyland. On August 3, 1962, Curtis formed another new film production company, Reynard Productions, Incorporated.

Curtis was one of many stars who had small roles in The List of Adrian Messenger (1963). He supported Gregory Peck in Captain Newman, M.D. (1963) and had an uncredited dual role in Paris When It Sizzles (1964). He and Kaufmann made their third movie together, the comedy Wild and Wonderful (1964). His focus remained on comedies: Goodbye Charlie (1964), with Debbie Reynolds; Sex and the Single Girl (1964), with Natalie Wood; The Great Race (1965), with Wood and Lemmon for Blake Edwards – the most expensive comedy film up till that time, but popular; Boeing Boeing (1965) a sex farce with Jerry Lewis; Not with My Wife, You Don't! (1966) with George C. Scott; Drop Dead Darling (1966), a British comedy with Rosanna Schiaffino; Don't Make Waves (1967), a satire of beach life from director Alexander Mackendrick, with Claudia Cardinale; and On My Way to the Crusades, I Met a Girl Who... (1967), an Italian comedy with Monica Vitti. In the early 1960s, he was a voice-over guest star on The Flintstones as "Stoney Curtis".

=== The Boston Strangler ===
Because of the poor performance of a series of comedies, Curtis fired his agent and took a pay cut to $100,000 (equal to $925,837 today) to play the title role in The Boston Strangler (1968), his first dramatic film in several years. Response from the critics and public was excellent. He returned to comedy for Monte Carlo or Bust! (1969), an all-star car race film in the vein of The Great Race.

He made some comic adventure tales: You Can't Win 'Em All (1970) with Charles Bronson and Suppose They Gave a War and Nobody Came (1970).

Curtis was signed by British producer Lew Grade for the TV series, The Persuaders!, which he co-starred with Roger Moore. (1971).

He was one of the villains in The Count of Monte Cristo (1975) and had the title role in the gangster film Lepke (1975). Curtis had the lead in a TV series that did not last, McCoy (1975–76). He was one of many names in The Last Tycoon (1976) and had the title role in an Italian comedy Casanova & Co. (1977). Later, Curtis co-starred as a casino owner in the Robert Urich 1978–1981 ABC series Vega$ and appeared in the 1978 movie The Users.

=== Later career ===
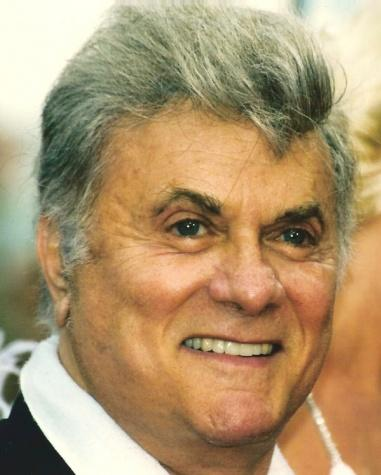
Curtis in 1997

Curtis supported Mae West in Sextette (1978) and starred in The Manitou (1978), a horror film, and The Bad News Bears Go to Japan (1978), a comedy. He had good roles in It Rained All Night the Day I Left (1980), Little Miss Marker (1980) and The Scarlett O'Hara War (1980) and was one of many stars in The Mirror Crack'd (1980). On ABC, he co-starred from 1978 to 1981 in prime time, as Las Vegas Desert Inn casino owner Philip (Slick) Roth, in 17 episodes of the Aaron Spelling produced series hit series, Vega$. After Vega$, on television, Curtis continued to make occasional guest appearances (sometimes playing fictional versions of himself) into the mid-2000s. His final TV series was as host of the documentary-retrospective series Hollywood Babylon (adapting Kenneth Anger's book series) in 1992–1993; each episode would include Curtis recalling some anecdotes from his own career. In 2002, Curtis was in the national tour of Some Like it Hot, a modified revival of the 1972 musical Sugar, itself based on the film in which he starred. Curtis played the supporting role of Osgood Fielding.

Curtis spoke of his disappointment at never being awarded an Oscar. In March 2006, Curtis received the Sony Ericsson Empire Lifetime Achievement Award. He also has a star on the Hollywood Walk of Fame inducted in 1960, and received the Ordre des Arts et des Lettres from France in 1995.

=== Painter ===
Throughout his life, Curtis enjoyed painting and, beginning in the early 1980s, painted as a second career. In the last years of his life, he concentrated on painting rather than movies. A surrealist, Curtis claimed Van Gogh, Matisse, Picasso and Magritte as influences. "I still make movies but I'm not that interested in them any more. But I paint all the time." In 2007, his painting The Red Table was on display in the Metropolitan Museum of Art in New York City. His paintings can also be seen at the Tony Vanderploeg Gallery in Carmel, California.

== Personal life ==
Curtis was married six times. His first wife was actress Janet Leigh, whom he married in 1951. The studio he was under contract with, Universal-International, generally stayed out of their stars' love lives. When he chose to get married, however, studio executives spent three days trying to talk him out of it, telling him he would be "poisoning himself at the box office." They threatened "banishment" back to the Bronx and the end of his budding career. In response, Curtis and Leigh defied the studio heads and eloped and were married by a local judge in Greenwich, Connecticut. Comedian and close friend Jerry Lewis was present as a witness.

The couple had two daughters, actresses Kelly Curtis and Jamie Lee Curtis.

The couple divorced in 1962. "For a while, we were Hollywood's golden couple," he said. "I was very dedicated and devoted to Janet, and on top of my trade, but in her eyes that goldenness started to wear off. I realized that whatever I was, I wasn't enough for Janet. That hurt me a lot and broke my heart."

The following year Curtis married Christine Kaufmann, the 18-year-old German co-star of his latest film, Taras Bulba. He stated that his marriage with Leigh had effectively ended "a year earlier". Curtis and Kaufmann had two daughters including Allegra Curtis. The couple divorced in 1968. After their divorce, Kaufmann resumed her career, which she had paused during their marriage.

On April 20, 1968, Curtis married Leslie Allen, with whom he had two sons. The couple divorced in 1982.

Curtis married Andrea Savio in 1984; they divorced in 1992.

The following year, on February 28, 1993, he married Lisa Deutsch. They divorced only a year later in 1994.

His sixth and last wife, Jill Vandenberg, was 45 years his junior. They met in a restaurant in 1993 and married on November 6, 1998. "The age gap doesn't bother us. We laugh a lot. My body is functioning and everything is good. She's the sexiest woman I've ever known. We don't think about time. I don't use Viagra either. There are 50 ways to please your lover."

On April 26, 1970, Curtis was arrested for marijuana possession at Heathrow Airport in London.

According to the Pittsburgh Post-Gazette, Curtis, who had a problem with alcoholism and drug abuse, went through the treatment center of the Betty Ford Clinic in the mid-1980s, which was successful for him.

In 1994, one of Curtis' sons died of a heroin drug overdose. Afterward, Curtis remarked that it was "a terrible thing when a father loses his son."

=== Philanthropy and activism ===
Beginning in 1990, Curtis and his daughter Kelly Lee Curtis took a renewed interest in their family's Hungarian Jewish heritage, and helped finance the rebuilding of the Great Synagogue in Budapest, Hungary. The largest synagogue in Europe today, it was originally built in 1859, and suffered damage during World War II.

In 1998, Curtis founded the Emanuel Foundation for Hungarian Culture, and served as honorary chairman. The organization works for the restoration and preservation of synagogues and the 1300 Jewish cemeteries in Hungary, and is dedicated to the 600,000 Jewish victims of the Holocaust in Hungary and lands occupied by the Royal Hungarian Army. Curtis also helped promote Hungary's national image in commercials.

In 2008, Curtis was featured in the documentary The Jill & Tony Curtis Story, which told the story of their efforts to rescue horses from slaughterhouses.

=== Books and appearances ===
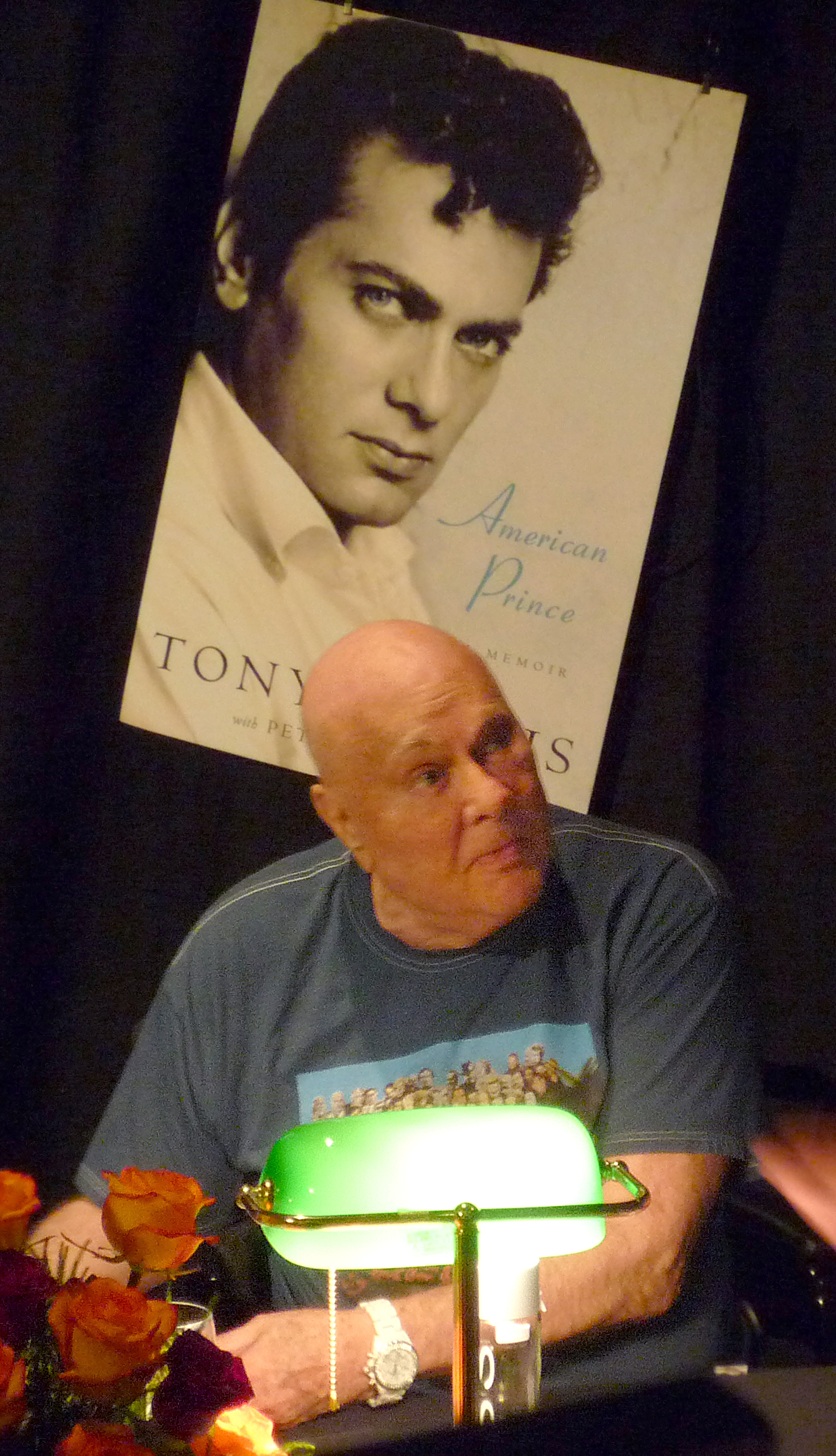
Curtis in 2009, during a book-signing of his memoir American Prince

In 1965, Tony Curtis was animated in an episode of The Flintstones; he also voiced his character Stoney Curtis. In 1994, a mural featuring his likeness, painted by the artist George Sportelli, was unveiled on the Sunset Boulevard overpass of the Hollywood Freeway Highway 101 in Los Angeles. The mural was relocated to Hollywood Boulevard and Bronson Avenue in September 2011. His face is featured among the celebrities on the cover of the Sgt. Pepper's Lonely Hearts Club Band album by The Beatles.

Also in 1994, the U.S. Navy Memorial Foundation awarded its Lone Sailor Award for his naval service and his subsequent acting career.

In 2004, he was inducted into the University of Nevada, Las Vegas Hall of Fame. A street is named after him in the Sun City Anthem development of his adopted hometown, Henderson, Nevada.

In 2005, Curtis was criticized after he stated that he would refuse to watch Brokeback Mountain. He additionally stated that John Wayne would not have approved of a film about gay cowboys.

In October 2008, Curtis's autobiography, American Prince: A Memoir, was published. In it, he describes his encounters with other Hollywood legends of the time, including Frank Sinatra and James Dean, as well as his hard-knock childhood and path to success. It was followed by the publication of his next book, The Making of Some Like it Hot: My Memories of Marilyn Monroe and the Classic American Movie (2009). Curtis shared his memories of the making of the movie, in particular about Marilyn Monroe, whose antics and attitude on the set made everyone miserable.

On May 22, 2009, Curtis apologized to the BBC radio audience after he used three profanities in a six-minute interview with BBC presenter William Crawley. The presenter also apologized to the audience for Curtis's "Hollywood realism." Curtis explained that he thought the interview was being taped, when it was in fact live.

== Health and death ==
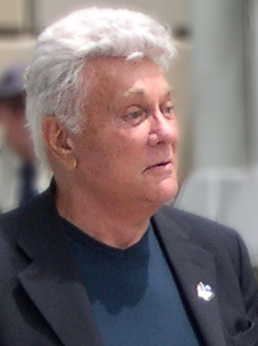
Curtis in 2004

In 1974, Curtis developed a heavy cocaine addiction while filming Lepke, at a time when his stardom had declined considerably and he was being offered few film roles. In 1984, Curtis was rushed to the hospital suffering from advanced cirrhosis as a result of his alcoholism and cocaine addiction. He then entered the Betty Ford Clinic and vowed to overcome his various illnesses. He underwent heart bypass surgery in 1994, after suffering a heart attack.

On July 8, 2010, Curtis, who suffered from chronic obstructive pulmonary disease (COPD), was hospitalized in Las Vegas after suffering an asthma attack during a book-signing engagement in Henderson, Nevada, where he lived.

Curtis died at his Henderson home on September 29, 2010, of cardiac arrest. A few days beforehand, he had met photographer Andy Gotts for a photo-shoot at his home, saying: "I'm not in a good way at the moment but can I ask you one thing? Can you make me look like an icon just one more time?" He left behind five surviving children and seven grandchildren. His widow Jill told the press that Curtis had suffered from various lung problems for years as a result of cigarette smoking, although he had quit smoking about 30 years earlier. During the 1960s Curtis served as the president of the American 'I Quit Smoking' Club. In a release to the Associated Press, his daughter, actress Jamie Lee Curtis, said:

My father leaves behind a legacy of great performances in movies and in his paintings and assemblages. He leaves behind children and their families who loved him and respected him and a wife and in-laws who were devoted to him. He also leaves behind fans all over the world. He will be greatly missed.

His remains were interred at Palm Memorial Park Cemetery in Henderson, Nevada, on October 4, 2010. The service was attended by daughters Kelly Curtis and Jamie Lee Curtis; as well as Arnold Schwarzenegger, Rich Little and Vera Goulet. Investor Kirk Kerkorian, actor Kirk Douglas, and singer Phyllis McGuire were among the honorary pallbearers. He was buried with a number of his favorite items, including a Stetson hat, an Armani scarf, driving gloves, a copy of his favorite novel, and his iPhone.

Five months before his death he rewrote his will leaving his entire estate to his wife, disinheriting all his children by name without explanation.

== In popular culture ==
In the 2022 Netflix film Blonde, Curtis is portrayed by Michael Masini.

== Filmography ==
=== Film ===
Year	Title	Role	Notes
1949	Criss Cross	Gigolo	Uncredited
1949	City Across the River	Mitch	Credited as Anthony Curtis
1949	Johnny Stool Pigeon	Joey Hyatt	Credited as Anthony Curtis
1949	The Lady Gambles	Bellboy	Credited as Anthony Curtis
1949	Take One False Step	Hot Rod Driver	Uncredited
1949	How to Smuggle a Hernia Across the Border	Unknown	Short
1950	Francis	Captain Jones	Credited as Anthony Curtis
1950	Woman in Hiding	Dave Shaw	Voice, Uncredited
1950	I Was a Shoplifter	Pepe	Credited as Anthony Curtis
1950	Sierra	Brent Coulter	Credited as Anthony Curtis
1950	Winchester '73	Doan	Credited as Anthony Curtis
1950	Kansas Raiders	Kit Dalton	
1951	The Prince Who Was a Thief	Julna	
1952	Flesh and Fury	Paul Callan	
1952	No Room for the Groom	Alvah Morrell	
1952	Son of Ali Baba	Kashma Baba	
1952	Meet Danny Wilson	Himself, Nightclub Patron	Uncredited
1953	Houdini	Harry Houdini	
1953	All American	Nick Bonnelli	
1953	Forbidden	Eddie	
1954	Beachhead	Burke	
1954	Johnny Dark	Johnny Dark	
1954	The Black Shield of Falworth	Myles	
1954	So This Is Paris	Joe Maxwell	
1955	Six Bridges to Cross	Jerry Florea	
1955	The Purple Mask	Rene de Traviere / Purple Mask	
1955	The Square Jungle	Eddie Quaid / Packy Glennon	
1956	Trapeze	Tino Orsini	
1956	The Rawhide Years	Ben Matthews	
1957	Mister Cory	Cory	also Executive Producer via Curtleigh Productions
1957	The Midnight Story	Joe Martini	
1957	Sweet Smell of Success	Sidney Falco	also Executive Producer via Curtleigh Productions
1958	The Vikings	Eric	
1958	Kings Go Forth	Corporal Britt Harris	
1958	The Defiant Ones	John "Joker" Jackson	also Executive Producer via Curtleigh Productions
1958	The Perfect Furlough	Corporal Paul Hodges	
1959	Some Like It Hot	Joe / Josephine / Shell Oil Junior	
1959	Operation Petticoat	Lieutenant Nicholas Holden	
1960	Who Was That Lady?	David Wilson	
1960	The Rat Race	Pete Hammond Jr.	
1960	Spartacus	Antoninus	
1960	Pepe	Himself	Uncredited
1960	The Great Impostor	Ferdinand Waldo Demara Jr. / Martin Donner / Dr. Gilbert	
1961	The Outsider	Ira Hamilton Hayes	
1962	Taras Bulba	Andriy Bulba	also Executive Producer via Curtleigh Productions
1962	40 Pounds of Trouble	Steve McCluskey	also Executive Producer via Curtis Enterprises
1963	The List of Adrian Messenger	Organ Grinder	Cameo
1963	Captain Newman, M.D.	Corporal Jackson "Jake" Leibowitz	also Executive Producer via Reynard Productions
1964	Paris When It Sizzles	Maurice / Philippe – 2nd Policeman	Uncredited
1964	Wild and Wonderful	Terry Willams	also Executive Producer via Reynard Productions
1964	Goodbye Charlie	George Tracy	
1964	Sex and the Single Girl	Bob Weston	also Executive Producer via Reynard Productions
1965	The Great Race	Leslie Gallant III (The Great Leslie)	also Executive Producer via Reynard Productions
1965	Boeing, Boeing	Bernard Lawrence	
1966	Chamber of Horrors	Mr. Julian	Uncredited
1966	Not with My Wife, You Don't!	Tom Ferris	also Executive Producer via Reynard Productions
1966	Arrivederci, Baby!	Nick Johnson	also known as Drop Dead Darling
1967	Don't Make Waves	Carlo Cofield	also Executive Producer via Reynard Productions
1967	On My Way to the Crusades, I Met a Girl Who...	Guerrando da Montone	
1968	Rosemary's Baby	Donald Baumgart	Voice, Uncredited
1968	The Boston Strangler	Albert DeSalvo	
1969	Monte-Carlo or Bust!	Chester Schofield	also known as Those Daring Young Men in Their Jaunty Jalopies
1970	You Can't Win 'Em All	Adam Dyer	
1970	Suppose They Gave a War and Nobody Came	Shannon Gambroni	
1974	Lepke	Louis "Lepke" Buchalter	
1976	The Last Tycoon	Rodriguez	
1977	Casanova & Co.	Giacomino / Casanova	
1978	The Manitou	Harry Erskine	
1978	Sextette	Alexei Karansky	
1978	The Bad News Bears Go to Japan	Marvin Lazar	
1979	Title Shot	Frank Renzetti	
1980	Little Miss Marker	"Blackie"	
1980	It Rained All Night the Day I Left	Robert Talbot	
1980	The Mirror Crack'd	Martin N. Fenn	
1982	Black Commando	Colonel Iago	
1982	BrainWaves	Dr. Clavius	
1982	Sparky's Magic Piano	TV Interviewer	Voice, Direct-to-Video
1983	Dexter the Dragon & Bumble the Bear	Unknown	Voice, English version
1983	Balboa	Ernie Stoddard	
1984	Where Is Parsifal?	Parsifal Katzenellenbogen	
1985	Insignificance	Senator	
1986	Club Life	Hector	
1986	The Last of Philip Banter	Charles Foster	
1988	Welcome to Germany	Mr. Cornfield	
1989	Lobster Man from Mars	J.P. Shelldrake	
1989	Midnight	Mr. B.	
1989	Walter & Carlo i Amerika	Willy La Rouge	
1991	Prime Target	Marietta Copella	Direct-To-Video
1992	Center of the Web	Stephen Moore	
1993	Naked in New York	Carl Fisher	
1993	The Mummy Lives	Aziru / Dr. Mohassid	
1995	The Immortals	Dominic	
1997	Bounty Hunters 2: Hardball	Wald	Direct-to-video
1997	Stargames	King Fendel	
1998	Louis & Frank	Lenny Star Springer	
1999	Play It to the Bone	Ringside Fan	
2002	Reflections of Evil	Host	
2006	Where's Marty?	Himself	Direct-to-DVD
2007	The Blacksmith and the Carpenter	God	Voice, Short
2008	David & Fatima	Mr. Schwartz	Final film role

=== Television ===
Year	Title	Role	Notes
1955	Allen in Movieland	Himself	Television Movie
1955–1956	The Ed Sullivan Show	Himself (Guest)	3 episodes
1959	The Joseph Cotten Show: On Trial	Charlie	Episode: "Man on a Rock"
1960	Startime	The Juggler	Episode: "The Young Juggler" also Executive Producer
1965	The Flintstones	Stony Curtis	Voice, Episode: "The Return of Stony Curtis"
1968	The Song Is You	Himself	Television Movie
1968–1971	Rowan & Martin's Laugh-In	Himself (Guest Performer)	Recurring role (8 episodes)
1970	American Cancer Society anti-smoking PSAs	Himself	multiple PSAs interview with Martin Agronsky on WTOP-TV News.
1971–1972	The Persuaders!	Danny Wilde / Aunt Sophie	Series regular (24 episodes)
1972	The ABC Comedy Hour	Himself (Guest Performer)	Episode: "The Friars Roast of Joe Namath"
1972	The Sonny & Cher Comedy Hour	Himself (Guest Performer)	2 episodes
1973	The Third Girl from the Left	Joey Jordan	Television Movie
1973	Shaft	Clifford Grayson	Episode: "Hit-Run"
1975	The Count of Monte-Cristo	Fernand Mondego	Television Movie
1975–1976	McCoy	McCoy	Series regular (5 episodes)
1978	The Users	Randy Brent	Television Movie
1978–1981	Vega$	Philip (Slick) Roth	Series regular (17 episodes, 1978–1981)
1980	The Scarlett O'Hara War	David O. Selznick	Television Movie
1981	Inmates: A Love Story	Flanagan	Television Movie
1981	The Million Dollar Face	Chester Masterson	Television Movie
1982	Portrait of a Showgirl	Joey DeLeon	Television Movie
1983	The Fall Guy	Joe O'Hara	Episode: "Eight Ball"
1986	Mafia Princess	Sam "Momo" Giancana	Television Movie
1986	Murder in Three Acts	Charles Cartwright	Television Movie
1989	Tarzan in Manhattan	Archimedes Porter	Television Movie
1990	Charlie	Scott Parish	Television Movie
1990	Thanksgiving Day	Max Schloss	Television Movie
1992	Christmas in Connecticut	Alexander Yardley	Television Movie
1992–1993	Hollywood Babylon	Himself (Host)	5 episodes
1994	Bandit: Beauty and the Bandit	Lucky Bergstrom	Television Movie
1994	A Perry Mason Mystery: The Case of the Grimacing Governor	Johnny Steele	Television Movie
1994	Cilla's World	Himself	Television Movie
1995–2003	Biography	Himself (Interviewee)	4 episodes – Episode: "Roger Moore" (1995) – Episode: "Ernest Borgnine" (2000) – Episode: "Tony Curtis" (2001) – Episode: "Janet Leigh" (2003)
1996	Lois & Clark: The New Adventures of Superman	Dr. Issac Mamba	Episode: "I Now Pronounce You..."
1996	Roseanne	Hal	Episode: "Ballroom Blitz"
1997	Elvis Meets Nixon	Himself	Uncredited, Television Movie
1998	Suddenly Susan	Peter DiCaprio	Episode: "Matchmaker, Matchmaker"
2004	Hope & Faith	Morris	Episode: "Jack's Back"
2005	CSI: Crime Scene Investigation	Himself	Episode: "Grave Danger (Part 1)"
2006	60 Minutes	Himself	Episode: "Gay Marriage/The Marilyn Mystery"
2010	Who Wants to Be a Millionaire	Himself (Celebrity Question Presenter)	Episode: "Million Dollar Movie Week 1"

== Radio appearances ==
Year	Program	Episode/source
1951	Suspense	The McKay College Basketball Scandal
1952	Stars in the Air	Model Wife

== Awards and nominations ==
Association	Year	Category	Nominated work	Result
Academy Awards	1959	Best Actor	The Defiant Ones	Nominated
BAFTA Awards	1958	Best Foreign Actor	Sweet Smell of Success	Nominated
BAFTA Awards	1959	Best Foreign Actor	The Defiant Ones	Nominated
Bambi Awards	1958	Best Actor, International	Sweet Smell of Success	Won
Bambi Awards	1959	Best Actor, International	The Defiant Ones	Nominated
Bambi Awards	1960	Best Actor, International	Some Like It Hot	Nominated
Bambi Awards	1973	TV series International	The Persuaders!	Won
Bravo Otto Awards	1972	Best Male TV Star	The Persuaders!	Won
California Independent Film Festival	2004	Lifetime Achievement Award	—	Won
David di Donatello Awards	2001	Special David	—	Won
Empire Awards	2006	Lifetime Achievement Award	—	Won
Golden Apple Awards	1952	Most Cooperative Actor	—	Won
Golden Apple Awards	1958	Most Cooperative Actor	—	Won
Golden Apple Awards	1964	Least Cooperative Actor	—	Won
Golden Camera Awards	2004	Lifetime Achievement Award	—	Won
Golden Globe Awards	1958	World Film Favorite, Male	—	Won
Golden Globe Awards	1959	Best Actor in a Motion Picture— Drama	The Defiant Ones	Nominated
Golden Globe Awards	1961	World Film Favorite, Male	—	Won
Golden Globe Awards	1969	Best Actor in a Motion Picture— Drama	The Boston Strangler	Nominated
Jules Verne Awards	2005	Lifetime Achievement Award	—	Won
Laurel Awards	1958	Top Male Dramatic Performance	Sweet Smell of Success	Nominated
Laurel Awards	1960	Top Male Star	—	Nominated
Laurel Awards	1960	Top Male Comedy Performance	Who Was That Lady?	Nominated
Laurel Awards	1961	Top Male Star	—	Nominated
Laurel Awards	1962	Top Male Star	—	Nominated
Laurel Awards	1962	Top Male Dramatic Performance	The Outsider	Nominated
Laurel Awards	1963	Top Male Star	—	Nominated
Laurel Awards	1963	Top Male Dramatic Performance	40 Pounds of Trouble	Nominated
Laurel Awards	1964	Top Male Star	—	Nominated
Laurel Awards	1964	Top Male Comedy Performance	Captain Newman, M.D.	Nominated
Laurel Awards	1965	Male Star	—	Nominated
Montreal World Film Festival	2008	Grand Prix Special des Ameriques	—	Won
Palm Springs International Film Festival	1995	Desert Palm Achievement Award	—	Won
Photoplay Award	1959	Most Popular Male Star	—	Won
Primetime Emmy Awards	1980	Outstanding Lead Actor in a Limited Series or a Special	The Scarlett O'Hara War	Nominated
Sitges Catalonian International Film Festival	2000	"The General" Honorary Award	—	Won
St. Louis International Film Festival	1997	Distinguished Hollywood Film Artist Award	—	Won
TP de Oro	1973	Best Foreign Actor	The Persuaders!	Nominated
Walk of Fame	1960	Star on the Walk of Fame–Motion Picture 6817 Hollywood Blvd.	—	Won

== Books ==
- Curtis, Tony; Barry Paris (1993). Tony Curtis: The Autobiography. New York: William Morrow & Company. ISBN 978-0-688-09759-2.
- Curtis, Tony; Peter Golenbock (2008). Tony Curtis: American Prince: My Autobiography. New York: Harmony Books. ISBN 978-0-307-40849-5.
- Curtis, Tony (2009). Some Like it Hot: My Memories of Marilyn Monroe and the Making of the Classic Movie. New York: John Wiley & Sons. p. 240. ISBN 978-0-470-53721-3.
