= Wild and Wonderful =

1964 film by Michael Anderson

- Directed by: Michael Anderson
- Written by: Richard M. Powell; Philip Rapp; Larry Markes; Michael Morris; Waldo Salt
- Based on: "I Married a Dog" (story) by Dorothy Crider
- Produced by: Harold Hecht
- Starring: Tony Curtis; Christine Kaufmann
- Cinematography: Joseph LaShelle
- Edited by: Gene Milford
- Music by: Morton Stevens
- Production companies: Harold Hecht Corporation; Reynard Productions
- Distributed by: Universal Pictures
- Release date: June 10, 1964
- Running time: 88 minutes
- Country: United States
- Language: English
- Box office: est. $2,000,000 (US/ Canada)

Wild and Wonderful is a 1964 comedy film directed by Michael Anderson and starring Tony Curtis and Christine Kaufmann. The screenplay concerns a clever French poodle named Monsieur Cognac, and the dog's effect on the newly married couple portrayed by Curtis and Kaufmann. The film was co-produced by Harold Hecht and Curtis, the actor's last under his long contractual relationship with Universal Studios.

== Plot ==
"Monsieur Cognac" is a white male poodle, a television and advertising star of 1960s Paris. The pampered pooch takes time out periodically by escaping his young mistress, Mademoiselle Giselle Ponchon, to roam the streets of Paris by night.

At a jazz bar American Terry Williams is performing with his combo. Monsieur Cognac takes a sip of the eponymous beverage from one of the musician's cups, but is really there to see the pretty female poodles appearing on the program. He teams up with Terry on a pub crawl, gets drunk - and accidentally turns green. Terry meets Giselle, Monsieur Cognac's owner, the following morning, when she, her father and the police storm Terry's apartment to arrest him for dog-napping.

Soon Terry and Giselle fall in love and even get married - much to the dismay of Giselle's father and Monsieur Cognac; the dog is jealous and tries to get rid of Terry. To have some peace and quiet on the wedding night at least, Terry pours a powdered sleeping pill into Monsieur Cognac's champagne glass. But the dog smells the ruse and switches glasses on Terry, who falls asleep on the wedding night! Next day Terry tries to make peace with a private "handshake", but the wily dog squeaks so loudly that Giselle, her father and her uncle rush into the room, assuming that Terry has hurt the dog.

Although Giselle ultimately catches on to Cognac's 'injured' act everyone else is duped, and the couple are driven apart when Terry walks out. Visiting his musician friends, Terry suddenly realizes that Monsieur Cognac is missing a Madame Cognac – and sets about to introduce him to Madam Poupée, a lovely white female poodle who appears at the jazz bar; Terry “borrows” her to smuggle onto the set where Giselle is recording a TV show with Monsieur Cognac. When Poupée's owner appears and accuses those present of kidnapping her, the poodles run riot. All ends well when Terry and Giselle finally kiss – in front of the TV camera.

== Cast ==
- Tony Curtis as Terry Williams
- Christine Kaufmann as Giselle Ponchon
- Larry Storch as Rufus Gibbs
- Pierre Olaf as Jacquot
- Marty Ingels as Doc Bailey
- Jacques Aubuchon as Papa Ponchon
- Sarah Marshall as Pamela
- Marcel Dalio as Dr. Reynard
- Jules Munshin as Rousseleau
- Marcel Hillaire as Inspector Duviver
- Cliff Osmond as Hercule
- Fifi D'Orsay as Simone
- Vito Scotti as Andre
- Steven Geray as Bartender
- Stanley Adams as Mayor of Man La Loquet

== Reception ==
The film had six credited writers, including Waldo Salt, who was then still working his way back from years on the Hollywood blacklist and who reportedly "hated" the film. In his 1999 obituary for Larry Markes, another of the credited writers, Dick Vosburgh of The Independent commented, "Critics found it hard to accept that it had taken six writers to fashion the wafer-thin tale of a jazz flautist whose marriage to a French film star is threatened by the jealous tricks of Monsieur Cognac, her neurotic, alcoholic French poodle." In his obituary for Tony Curtis in 2010, film critic Dave Kehr dismissed the film as "disastrous," noting that Curtis was rebuilding his reputation after an earlier affair with Kaufmann, his co-star in Wild and Wonderful, and subsequent divorce from Janet Leigh.

== See also ==
- List of American films of 1964
