= 40 Pounds of Trouble =

1962 film by Norman Jewison

- Theatrical release poster
- Directed by: Norman Jewison
- Written by: Marion Hargrove
- Based on: Little Miss Marker by Damon Runyon
- Produced by: Stan Margulies
- Starring: Tony Curtis; Suzanne Pleshette; Larry Storch
- Cinematography: Joseph MacDonald
- Edited by: Marjorie Fowler
- Music by: Mort Lindsey
- Production company: Curtis Enterprises
- Distributed by: Universal-International Pictures
- Release date: December 31, 1962
- Running time: 106 minutes
- Country: United States
- Language: English
- Box office: $2,750,000 (US/ Canada)

40 Pounds of Trouble is a 1962 comedy film directed by Norman Jewison and starring Tony Curtis, Suzanne Pleshette, Larry Storch and Phil Silvers. It is based on Damon Runyon's 1932 short story "Little Miss Marker", filmed in 1934 as Little Miss Marker, in 1949 as Sorrowful Jones and in 1980 as Little Miss Marker.

== Plot ==
At Stateline, Nevada, Villa D'Oro casino gambling manager Steve McCluskey and its club singer Chris Lockwood find their hands full when they agree to take in a troublesome young girl named Penny Piper, left behind in the casino by her gambling father. The little girl hinders the manager's plans to keep his gaming license. Penny thinks that Steve needs to get married and settle down, so she starts trying to bring him and Chris together. Steve is still reeling from his failed first marriage and is apprehensive about remarriage.

== Cast ==
- Tony Curtis as Steve McCluskey
- Suzanne Pleshette as Chris Lockwood
- Claire Wilcox as Penelope "Penny" Piper
- Larry Storch as Floyd
- Howard Morris as Julius
- Edward Andrews as Herman
- Karen Steele as Bambi
- Sharon Farrell as Dolores
- Stubby Kaye as Cranston
- Warren Stevens as Swing
- Kevin McCarthy as Louie Blanchard
- Paul Comi as Deputy Sheriff Cavanaugh
- Ford Rainey as Judge
- Gregg Palmer as Howard Piper
- Phil Silvers as Bernie "The Butcher" Friedman

== Production ==
40 Pounds of Trouble marked Norman Jewison's feature-film directorial debut after several years as a television director. It was also Stan Margulies' feature-film debut as a producer debut after having been executive producer on the television series Tales of the Vikings for Brynaprod.

Tony Curtis and Margulies, the owners of the film-production company Curtis Enterprises, sent Walt Disney a copy of the script and were surprised when Disney phoned them three days later to grant his approval, with only a minor alteration to the script. The film was shot on location at Disneyland and at Harrah's Club near Lake Tahoe. It was the first motion picture to receive permission from Disney to film at the park; he had previously rejected about 20 film requests because he did not like the scripts. In return, he received a bonus and the rights to use the film footage for any purpose as long as it did not show the actors. The Disneyland footage was shot over six days in late April 1962.

The producers faced a challenge with the legal requirement to provide schooling for the 75 to 100 child extras who would appear in the Disneyland sequence. Margulies sought to rent a nearby warehouse to serve as a makeshift classroom, but a theater within the park was used.

40 Pounds of Trouble was the only released film completed by Curtis Enterprises, as Curtis and Margulies formed a new company, Reynard Productions, shortly afterward.

== Release ==
40 Pounds of Trouble had a limited one-day-only New Year's Eve screening at select theaters across the United States on the night of December 31, 1962. Theaters showed the film as many as three times that night in celebration of the new year. The film had its official world premiere on January 18, 1963, at the Carib-Miami-Miracle Theaters in Miami, Florida, and the next day at Harrah's Club's South Shore Room in Lake Tahoe, Nevada. The film then opened to the rest of the United States during the last week of January and first week of February 1963. It was a success, and the film was nominated for a Golden Laurel Award for Top Comedy and Curtis was nominated for a Golden Laurel Award for Top Male Comedy Performance.

== Critical reception ==
In a contemporary review for The New York Times, critic Bosley Crowther called 40 Pounds of Trouble a "bluntly promotional film" with a "slapdash and witless script" and wrote:

Considering that the first part of the picture is pretty much an illustrated plug for Harrah's Club at Lake Tahoe, Nev., where much of it was brightly photographed, one might reckon it a television picture, with obvious commercials built in. And considering that its first-time-out director, Norman Jewison, is straight from television, it's no wonder that it has a video look. Mr. Curtis, Suzanne Pleshette as the singer and Claire Wilcox as the baby-talking child are as banal as spot-commercial hawkers of headache tablets or crunchy breakfast foods. The trouble with "40 Pounds of Trouble" is that it is just too hackneyed and dull.
