= Taras Bulba (1962 film) =

1962 historical adventure drama film by J. Lee Thompson

- Theatrical release poster
- Directed by: J. Lee Thompson
- Screenplay by: Waldo Salt; Karl Tunberg
- Based on: Taras Bulba by Nikolai Gogol
- Produced by: Harold Hecht
- Starring: Tony Curtis; Yul Brynner; Christine Kaufmann
- Cinematography: Joe MacDonald
- Edited by: Folmar Blangsted; Gene Milford; William Reynolds; Eda Warren
- Music by: Franz Waxman
- Production companies: Harold Hecht Productions; Curtleigh Productions; Avala Film
- Distributed by: United Artists
- Release dates: December 19, 1962 (Chicago); December 25, 1962 (New York City); December 26, 1962 (Los Angeles)
- Running time: 122 minutes 124 minutes (TCM print)
- Country: United States
- Language: English
- Budget: $6 million
- Box office: $3,400,000 (rentals)

Taras Bulba is a 1962 American historical adventure drama film based on Nikolai Gogol's novel Taras Bulba, starring Tony Curtis and Yul Brynner. The film was directed by J. Lee Thompson.

== Plot ==
In the 17th century, Ukraine, Russia, Poland, and elsewhere in eastern Europe are divided into small sections and principalities that fight each other or against one enemy: in this case, the Ottoman Empire. A battle rages between the Turks and the Poles. The Poles are losing until the Cossacks arrive to save the day. However, it turns out that the Poles are merely holding back in order to treacherously attack the Cossacks after they win the battle for them. As a result, the Poles become masters of Ukraine and the Cossacks are subjugated. Taras Bulba, one of the Cossack colonels, returns home to raise his family but now it is under Polish dominion. Taras and the other Cossacks of the Cossack Brotherhood burn their farms and take to the hills and forests rather than submit to the Poles.

Two decades later, Taras sends his two sons, Andriy and Ostap to the academy at Kiev, to obtain a Polish education. There, the elder son, Andriy, falls in love with a Polish princess, Natalia Dubrov, to the ire of the locals, who treat the Cossack brothers like scum of the earth. Ultimately, the brothers are forced to flee Kiev, returning to their father’s house on the Ukrainian steppes.

There, word comes that the Poles want the Cossacks to raise an army to help them in a new war. When Andriy objects to fighting for the Poles, he is accused of being a coward. This is a serious offense that can only be resolved by a test of courage. Andriy and his accuser ride and jump their horses over a chasm until God chooses which one is right by having the accuser fall to his death. Taras embraces Andriy’s lead. He plans to betray the Poles and take back Ukraine.

Ivan Mykola, Hetman of the Cossack Brotherhood, summons the Brotherhood to fight in the Baltic region under Polish command. Taras Bulba balks, saying the time has come to avenge the Polish treachery of twenty years before. The Hetman says he has sworn the Brotherhood will follow him to the Baltic. Taras says they will not go and calls on the Brethren to decide whom they will follow. They choose Taras. The deposed Hetman says he cannot follow, and is ridden down by the Brotherhood as Taras takes the Holy Banner of St. Michael and with it, command.

Now the Hetman of the Cossack Brotherhood, Taras leads them to Dubno, where the Poles are expecting the Cossacks to join them. Instead, the Cossacks attack the Polish army and drive it back into the city. The Cossacks then lay siege to the city. Hunger and disease set in. Andriy, fearing for the life of his Polish lover, sneaks into the city in an attempt to rescue her. He is captured and she is condemned to be burned at the stake for the crime of loving a Cossack. To save her, Andriy agrees to lead a raiding party to bring cattle into the starving city.

Meanwhile, the Cossacks have grown bored with the inactivity of the siege and a large number of them have departed for home. When the Polish commander realizes the weakness of the Cossacks against the raiding party, he orders his whole army to attack. Taras Bulba encounters his son on the field of battle and kills him for his betrayal before joining the general retreat to the edge of a cliff at a river gorge. There, the Cossacks who left the siege to go home rejoin the battle and large numbers of men and horses, both Cossack and Polish, are pushed over the edge to their deaths in the river below.

The Cossacks are victorious and enter Dubno. Andriy is to be buried there, as “... it is now a Cossack city.” By the words of Hetman Taras Bulba, the Cossacks will not treat the Poles as badly as they were treated by them: "We will not ravage. We will not pillage. We will burn out the plague, and open the supply wagons, and feed the people of our city."

== Cast ==
- Tony Curtis as Andriy Bulba
- Yul Brynner as Taras Bulba
- Christine Kaufmann as Natalia Dubrov
- Sam Wanamaker as Filipenko
- Brad Dexter as Shilo
- Guy Rolfe as Prince Grigory
- Perry Lopez as Ostap Bulba
- George Macready as Governor
- Ilka Windish as Sofia Bulba
- Vladimir Sokoloff as Old Stepan
- Vladimir Irman as Grisha Kubenko
- Daniel Ocko as Ivan Mykola
- Abraham Sofaer as Abbot
- Mickey Finn as Korzh
- Richard Rust as Captain Alex
- Ron Weyand as Tymoshevsky
- Vitina Marcus as Gypsy Princess

== Production ==
=== Development ===
The film was a long-time dream project for director Robert Aldrich who worked on it for five years. He said they did "four or five" scripts of the novel, the last of which was "sensational". In January 1959 it was announced the film would be made in Yugoslavia as a co-production between Aldrich & Associates and Avala Films of Yugoslavia. The budget was to be $3 million and Anthony Quinn would play the lead. David Chantler wrote the script. It would be the first American-Yugoslavian co-production. Financing fell through at the last minute and the film was cancelled in March. Aldrich still wanted to make it but fell into financial trouble and ended up selling the script. In May 1959 it was announced Joseph Kaufman had purchased the script and associated research materials from Aldrich for $100,000.

Aldrich claimed Joseph Kaufman was acting as a front for producer Harold Hecht, who had been long associated with more social realist dramas starring Burt Lancaster. After deciding to do some projects without Lancaster, Hecht began working on several films including this adaptation of Gogol's story. The work attracted him because "it was color, flamboyancy, but most of all, a strong personal story, difficult to come by in spectacle."

=== Casting ===
In February 1961 Hecht signed Tony Curtis, simultaneously negotiating a co-production deal with the actor's film production company, Curtleigh Productions. In July Yul Brynner's casting was announced. The same month he signed on director J. Lee Thompson, who had just completed Cape Fear. "The spectacle will come second," said Thompson. "The important things are the storyline, credibility and the characterizations." After looking at locations in ten countries, it was decided to film in Argentina.

The female lead would be played by German-Austrian actress Christine Kaufmann who had starred in Town Without Pity. She signed a two-year six-film contract with Hecht. The same month Van Heflin said he would be starring in a rival Taras Bulba movie to be shot in Europe. Susan Hampshire was meant to play a role but reportedly pulled out when her personal relationship with Thompson ended.

=== Filming ===
Filming began in Argentina on 10 October 1961. The unit was based in the town of Salta. The filming on location in Argentina continued until the end of the year before the production returned to Hollywood. Filming wrapped in late February.

Thompson called Brynner "an open air actor who needs a big expanse, a big tour de force. He is a marvelous Taras and a fine actor, but should never play comedy." The director also admired Curtis saying "he has really fought and is so eager and he has never stopped working. His is a very romantic part but not as flashy as Yul's."

== Music ==
The score was composed by Franz Waxman. The film composer Bernard Hermann considered it one of the best scores ever written. The music was nominated for:

- 35th Academy Awards (April 8, 1963) - nominated for an Oscar in Music Score — Substantially Original (lost to Maurice Jarre and his work on Lawrence of Arabia)

== Release ==
The film was budgeted at $3.8 million but went $2.2 million over. After poor sales at the box office, it ended up costing United Artists about $4.5 million.

== See also ==
- List of American films of 1962
