= Richard M. Powell (screenwriter) =

American screenwriter

- Born: December 15, 1916; Cincinnati, Ohio, US
- Died: October 20, 1996 (aged 79); Los Angeles, California, US
- Occupation: Screenwriter
- Years active: 1952-1980

Richard M. Powell (December 15, 1916 – October 20, 1996) was an American screenwriter.

Born in Cincinnati, Ohio, he attended the University of Cincinnati where he began writing. He tried law school but did not feel it was a good match. He served in World War II in the Army Entertainment Corps. He married a dancer, Libby Burke, whose death in childbirth was very hard on him. Later he married Alice Shragowitz, an activist and intellectual originally from Minneapolis. Both he and Alice were transplants from the Midwest to Los Angeles arriving in California after World War II.

Richard Powell was a prolific writer, writing scripts for a number of episodes of popular television series as well as for feature-length films. He was president of the Television Writers branch of the Writers Guild during the 1950s and continued to be extremely active in the Guild until his death. He was blacklisted during the 1950s and ’60s and was unable to work under his own name for more than ten years, causing him to rely on other writers who were his friends to put their names on his work.

His credits included Quincy, The Mary Tyler Moore Show, M*A*S*H, Charlie's Angels, The Andy Griffith Show, The Courtship of Eddie's Father, All That Glitters, and many others. Later in his career, Richard entered into a development contract with Hollywood producer David Biegelman and MGM for three years. He was nominated for an Emmy Award for his writing on a Bob Hope and Lucille Ball comedy special and won the Morgan Cox Award for lifetime contribution to the Writer’s Guild only a year before his death. Powell was also a prolific writer for Hogan's Heroes, having written over a third of the 168 episodes. Many of the Hogan episodes were co-written with his writing partner, Arthur Julian.

He was an activist involved in anti-war and human rights advocacy and a father to two sons. He and wife Alice were married for 34 years, until his death, and together had two children.

In 1993, he discussed his life experiences and career in Hollywood in an interview for the cable TV program "Senior Prom" with interviewer Stanley Dyrector. In 1994 he received the Writers Guild of America's Morgan Cox Award, which is given to a member who exemplifies the ideal of service to the Guild.

Richard M. Powell died of prostate cancer in Los Angeles, California, aged 79.

Richard's legacy lives on through his son Anthony who also works in the Television business, most recently for PBS Kansas.
