= Trapeze (film) =

1956 film by Carol Reed

- Theatrical release poster
- Directed by: Carol Reed
- Written by: Liam O'Brien (adaptation); James R. Webb (screenplay)
- Based on: The Killing Frost; 1950 novel by Max Catto
- Produced by: James Hill
- Starring: Burt Lancaster; Tony Curtis; Gina Lollobrigida
- Cinematography: Robert Krasker
- Edited by: Bert Bates
- Music by: Malcolm Arnold
- Production companies: Hecht-Lancaster Productions; Joanna Productions; Susan Productions
- Distributed by: United Artists
- Release date: May 30, 1956
- Running time: 105 minutes
- Country: United States
- Languages: English; Italian
- Budget: $4 million
- Box office: $15.5 million (US)

Trapeze is a 1956 American circus film directed by Carol Reed and starring Burt Lancaster, Tony Curtis and Gina Lollobrigida. The film is based on Max Catto's 1950 novel The Killing Frost, with an adapted screenplay written by Liam O'Brien.

The film performed well at the box office, placing among the top three earners of 1956 in the United States and Canada and as the fourth-most-popular film at the British box office in 1956.

== Plot ==
Embittered trapeze aerialist and former star Mike Ribble needs a cane to walk, the result of a fall during a performance. Brash, inexperienced Tino Orsini wants Mike to train him to do the dangerous triple somersault. Mike, only the sixth man to complete the triple, brushes him off at first, but comes to believe that Tino is capable of matching his feat and starts teaching him. However, the manipulative Lola enamors Tino, convinced that he is a star in the making. Mike is pressured into adding her to the new act.

Tensions rise as Lola and Mike are attracted to each other, though Mike sees clearly how mercenary she is. A love triangle forms. Tino comes to resent Mike's attempts to warn him about Lola, so he breaks up with Mike.

However, during a performance attended by circus VIP John Ringling North, Mike talks Tino into attempting the triple. Bouglione, the circus owner, tries to stop them by having the safety net taken down, but Tino goes ahead anyway and achieves the highly dangerous feat. A greatly impressed North immediately offers all three a job with his circus. Tino wants Mike back, but he leaves. Lola follows her heart (and Mike).

== Cast ==
- Burt Lancaster as Mike Ribble
- Tony Curtis as Tino Orsini
- Gina Lollobrigida as Lola
- Katy Jurado as Rosa
- Thomas Gomez as Bouglione
- Johnny Puleo as Max
- Minor Watson as John Ringling North
- Gérard Landry as Chikki
- Jean-Pierre Kérien as Otto
- Sid James as Harry the Snake Charmer
- Gamil Ratib as Stefan

== Production ==
Lancaster, a former circus acrobat, performed many of his own stunts, though the most dangerous (including the climactic triple somersault) were performed by technical consultant Eddie Ward from the Ringling Brothers Circus.

Trapeze was filmed entirely in Paris, including at the Cirque d'hiver and at the nearby Billancourt studios.

== Reception ==
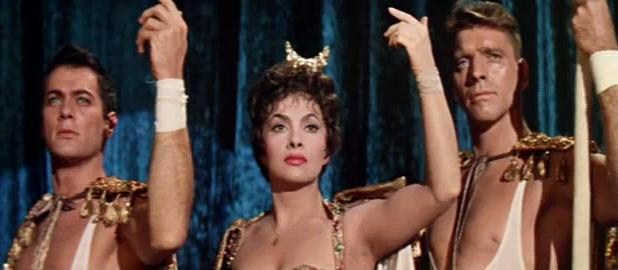
Curtis, Lollobrigida and Lancaster

Lancaster won the Silver Bear for Best Actor award at the 6th Berlin International Film Festival. Reed was nominated for best director by the Directors Guild of America.

Pauline Kael of The New Yorker wrote: "There's vitality in Carol Reed's direction, and an exuberant sweep in Robert Krasker's camera work. Burt Lancaster and Gina Lollobrigida function as stars--they're magnetic."

Bosley Crowther panned the film in his review for The New York Times, writing that the story was "dismally obvious and monotonous", the direction no better and the dialogue "dull and hackneyed." He also criticized the film's leads, writing that Lollobrigida offered nothing beyond her beauty and that Curtis and Lancaster were both uninteresting.

== See also ==
- List of American films of 1956
