= Bryna Productions =

American film production company

- Bryna Productions logo, designed in November 1956, as it appears in the opening screen credits of Ride Out for Revenge.
- Trade name: Bryna Productions, Incorporated
- Type: Privately held company
- Industry: Film; television
- Founded: September 28, 1949; 77 years ago in Hollywood, California, United States
- Founder: Kirk Douglas
- Successors: The Bryna Company; Bryna Industries; TBC Merger
- Headquarters: 141 El Camino Drive, Suite 209, Beverly Hills, California, United States
- Key people: Jerry Bresler; Anne Douglas; Joel Douglas; Michael Douglas; Peter Douglas; Edward Lewis; Martin Melcher
- Products: Motion pictures
- Subsidiaries: Bryna Corporation; Bryna International; Brynaprod; Cameron Productions; Douglas and Lewis Productions; Eric Productions; Joel Productions; Michael Productions; Peter Vincent Music; Public Relations Consultants

Bryna Productions (later renamed The Bryna Company) is an American independent film and television production company established by actor Kirk Douglas in 1949. The company also produced a handful of films through its subsidiaries, Michael Productions, Joel Productions and Douglas and Lewis Productions, and outside the United States through Brynaprod. Other subsidiaries included Eric Productions, which produced stage plays, Peter Vincent Music, a music publishing company, Bryna International, a photographic service company, and Public Relations Consultants, which supervised the publicity of its early films. Douglas named the main company after his mother, Bryna Demsky Danielovitch (Bryna is pronounced Brina with a long i); its primary subsidiaries were named after his sons: Michael Douglas, Joel Douglas, Peter Douglas and Eric Douglas. In 1970, Bryna Productions was renamed The Bryna Company, when Douglas welcomed his children and second wife into the firm. Nevertheless, Michael, Joel and Peter, wanting to establish individual identities, went on to form their own independent film production companies.

The company had some major film successes, including Paths of Glory, The Vikings, Spartacus, Seven Days in May, Seconds, Grand Prix, One Flew Over the Cuckoo's Nest, The Final Countdown, and Something Wicked This Way Comes. Four of the films Bryna Productions made have been deemed "culturally, historically, or aesthetically significant" by the United States National Film Preservation Board and have been selected for preservation in the Library of Congress' National Film Registry: Paths of Glory in 1992, One Flew Over the Cuckoo's Nest in 1993, Seconds in 2015 and Spartacus in 2017. The company was also recognized by the American Cinematheque in 1989, when it held a three-day festival with the screening of eight Bryna Productions films.

Twenty-one of Bryna Productions' films have won and been nominated for awards and prizes at various ceremonies and film festivals. Awards include the Academy Awards, the Golden Globe Awards, the British Academy Film Awards, the Grammy Awards, the Saturn Awards, and the Primetime Emmy Awards. They have been shown at the Cannes Film Festival, the Berlin International Film Festival, the San Sebastián International Film Festival, the Avoriaz Fantastic Film Festival and the Chicago International Film Festival.

Bryna Productions often co-produced films with other notable independent film production companies, including Hecht-Hill-Lancaster Films, Curtleigh Productions, Gibraltar Productions, Cherokee Productions, Harris-Kubrick Pictures, Walt Disney Productions and Touchstone Pictures. It also had financing and distribution deals with major Hollywood studios like United Artists, Metro-Goldwyn-Mayer, Paramount Pictures, Columbia Pictures, Universal-International Pictures, Rank Film Distributors, National General Pictures and Buena Vista, for motion pictures, as well as United Artists Television, NBC, CBS and HBO, for television.

== History ==
=== Formation of Bryna Productions and early projects (1949–1954) ===
Kirk Douglas formed an independent film production company at the suggestion of his friend and I Walk Alone co-star, Burt Lancaster, who was already having success with his own film production company, Norma Productions. Lancaster and his agent, Harold Hecht, formed Norma Productions in 1947, at a time when many actors, directors and producers were forming their independent units, which quickly became the largest and most successful independent film production unit in Hollywood during the 1950s. Douglas registered his new company, Bryna Productions, Incorporated, on September 28, 1949, and immediately began optioning properties and securing writers and directors, though it would take more than five years for a project to make it before the cameras. Douglas' mother, Bryna Demsky, after whom the company was named, was a stockholder in the firm.

The first property acquired by Bryna Productions was Ben Hecht's short story The Shadow, about a magician who seeks vengeance against his twin brother for the alienation of his blind wife. Douglas made a deal with lawyer-turned-agent-turned-producer Charles K. Feldman (who, ironically, had tried to sue Lancaster and Norma Productions in 1948) to head Bryna Productions and produce The Shadow at Republic Pictures. Feldman hired screenwriter Charles O'Neal to write the screenplay (O'Neal retitled the film Mr. Shadow), which was to star Douglas in dual roles of the twin brothers. In the role of the estranged wife, Douglas first wanted to cast Jane Greer, then Jane Wyman. By early 1952, Bryna Productions was attempting to film The Shadow in England.

In June 1950, Bryna Productions optioned Irwin Gielgud's story The Life of David Garrick, a story about the life and career of English actor David Garrick. The property was to be filmed under the title Garrick's Gayeties, for which Douglas hoped to co-star with Judy Garland in the role of Peg Woffington. In September 1950, Bryna Productions procured Ivan Thors' screenplay Nowhere to Go, a story about a displaced person fighting for a new home in the United States. Bryna Productions also owned the filming rights to Darwin Teihet's novel The Fear Makers, which Douglas hoped to direct himself.

In March 1952, Douglas revealed plans for Bryna Productions to make three films a year, with him to star in only one of the three yearly films. Producer William Schorr, who had previously been attached to Billy Wilder and produced the Douglas-starring film Ace in the Hole, became an executive partner at Bryna Productions. Schorr was to oversee the production of films, as associate producer, while Douglas would star in the pictures; Schorr would remain instrumental to Bryna Productions for the next four years. That year, Bryna Productions became tied to Strange Harvest, a yarn about a World War II G.I. who returns to visit Italy with his new American wife, only to discover that he has a young son from a war-time fling with an Italian woman. Strange Harvest was written by Sy Bartlett and Harold Conrad; Bartlett co-wrote the screenplay with Schorr, and the film was to be directed by David Miller on location in Italy.

Douglas hoped to film most of his early productions in Europe. In 1953, he and Schorr attempted to secure a two-picture deal with Italian producers Carlo Ponti and Dino De Laurentiis. The plan was for Douglas to star in the Italian producers' film Ulysses, in exchange for a co-production deal to film The Shadow, which Douglas hoped to finally get underway with Anatole Litvak secured as director. Ulysses came through but The Shadow was never made. In June 1953, Bryna Productions discussed a co-production deal with Sidney Sheldon to film Alice in Arms in Italy, adapted from a play in which Douglas had appeared on Broadway in 1945.

By January 1954, the local for Strange Harvest had been changed from Italy to Japan, when a financing deal was secured there, and Bryna Productions wanted Marlon Brando to star in the picture. Later in 1954, Bryna Productions acquired Robert Carson's story The Quality of Mercy, though its filming rights were up to challenge. Bryna Productions had been given permission by the author via a verbal agreement, whereas John Wayne and his business partner Robert Fellows had received a written agreement from Carson's agent, through their film production company Batjac Productions. A partnership was then formed between Batjac Productions and Bryna Productions to co-produce the film together, with Douglas starring and Ben Hecht writing the screenplay. Batjac Productions' existing Warner Brothers Pictures financing and distribution deal would back the picture, though it was ultimately never made. In April 1954, it was reported that Douglas was interested in producing and starring in a television series through Bryna Productions. In September 1954, Bryna Productions showed interest in filming Robert Wright Campbell's already-written film script The Dangerous Game.

=== Six-picture deal with United Artists (1955) ===
In early January 1955, Douglas formally activated Bryna Productions by signing a six-picture, three-year financing and distribution deal with United Artists. After signing the deal, Douglas and his second wife, Anne Douglas, were invited out to celebrate with cocktails at 21 Club in New York City by United Artists executives, president Arthur B. Krim and board chairman Robert S. Benjamin. That month, Stanley Margulies was appointed Publicity Director for Bryna Productions' new subsidiary, Public Relations Consultants, Incorporated, and the company's first two motion pictures were announced: The Viking Raiders, a swashbuckler about Vikings pillaging the coast of Brittany, adapted by Edison Marshall's novel and to be directed by Richard Fleischer; and Van Gogh, a biopic of Vincent Van Gogh, to be directed by Jean Negulesco. Douglas was to star in both. A month later, however, in February 1955, it was announced that The Indian Fighter, a story about a reckless adventurer who tries to foment a war between the Indians and the western settlers after the Civil War, with a screenplay by Ben Hecht and Frank Davis and also starring Douglas, would be the inaugural picture to be filmed. That same month, Norman A. Cook was appointed General Manager of Bryna Productions.

The Van Gogh biopic property was subject to some debate as Metro-Goldwyn-Mayer also owned the filming rights to a similar story, Lust for Life, based on Irving Stone's novel, with John Houseman secured as producer and Vincente Minnelli inked as director. American producer Robert Goldstein was also in a partnership with Italian producer Giuseppe Amato, ready to film a Van Gogh biopic in Rome from an original Harry Brown screenplay. Instead of battling Metro-Goldwyn-Mayer over the property, Douglas chose to approach the company and offered to make the picture together, with his services as an actor.

In March 1955, Bryna Productions moved into its first official headquarter office at 9235 West Third Street, Beverly Hills, California. That same month, it was announced that the company hoped to film Jacquin Sanders' novel Freak Show, a provocative love story about a wrestler and a freak girl at a carnival. The Indian Fighter secured André de Toth as director in early March 1955, and was originally scheduled to begin filming in early April 1955, but due to Douglas' personal publicity tour promoting Man Without a Star for Universal-International Pictures, the shooting only began on May 23, 1955. The film was shot entirely on location, using CinemaScope cameras and Technicolor film, during five weeks in and around Bend, Oregon, without any studio retakes, for a cost of over $1,000,000. Bryna Productions also brought over Italian actress Elsa Martinelli for the femme lead and featured actors like Walter Matthau, Lon Chaney, Jr., Alan Hale, Jr., and Douglas' former wife Diana Douglas. After the filming was completed, Bryna Productions hired folk singer Terry Gilkyson to sing a couple of songs written by Irving Gordon and Franz Waxman to compose the score. Bryna Productions also acquired the filming rights to Robert Wright Campbell's original screenplay The Allison Brothers for $25,000, a story written especially for the author's brother, William Campbell.

Immediately after completing The Indian Fighter, Douglas began filming Metro-Goldwyn-Mayer's Lust for Life in France, Belgium, Italy and the Netherlands, following which he planned to produce and star in The Viking Raiders; the Norse film would, however, be pushed back by three years. While in Europe, Bryna Productions optioned German author Klaus Schuitz's story The Runaway Heart, which deals with an Italian girl who falls in love with an SS Nazi officer during World War II. The male lead was to be played by Douglas, while the Italian role was offered to Sophia Loren.

In October 1955, after returning from Europe for the filming of Lust for Life, Douglas named three new executives for Bryna Productions: Jerry Bresler was appointed Producer and General Manager; Myer P. Beck was appointed Producer's Representative; and David E. Weshner was appointed Sales and Distribution Representative. The company then announced plans to film Robert Alan Aurthur's original story Shadow of the Champ. The plot revolved around a has-been boxing champion's romance with a lonely woman, and had already been adapted for television on The Philco Television Playhouse earlier that year. The story's filming rights were advanced by United Artists for $100,000; the highest fee ever paid at the time for a television package-play. The film was to be co-produced with Jonathan Productions, a company founded by Aurthur, David Susskind and Alfred Levy, with Douglas to play only a secondary character in the film. Although Aurthur wrote the screenplay, Shadow of the Champ was ultimately never made, but the writer collaborated on four future projects with Bryna Productions: A Very Special Baby, Spring Reunion, Tales of the Vikings and Grand Prix.

=== One-picture deals with Metro-Goldwyn-Mayer (1955–1956) ===
By December 1955, Bryna Productions had negotiated a secondary financing and distribution deal (separate from the six-picture United Artists deal) with Arthur Loew, president of Metro-Goldwyn-Mayer, for a single picture. Metro-Goldwyn-Mayer was rarely dealing with independent film production companies at that time so the one-picture deal was somewhat of an achievement in the film industry. Even more so surprising was that Bryna Productions was negotiating a second one-picture pact with the same studio. The first film for Metro-Goldwyn-Mayer was to be The Syndicate, set to star Douglas and Jeanne Crain and to be co-produced with Frank and Maurice King's King Brothers Productions. The second film was to be King Kelly, based on Robert Wright Campbell's novel about an ambitious soldier who attempts to set up his own empire in the Southwest after the Civil War, with Douglas starring and Daniel Mainwaring writing the screenplay. By the end of 1955, Bryna Productions' plans were to produce two films in 1956 (Shadow of the Champ for United Artists and King Kelly for Metro-Goldwyn-Mayer), and to be able to produce three to four pictures a year by 1957. The Indian Fighter simultaneously premiered on December 21, 1955, at the Mayfair Theatre in New York City and at the Liberty Theatre in Portland, Oregon; it was an immediate success.

In January 1956, Bryna Productions acquired the filming rights to Samuel Grafton's novel A Most Contagious Game, the story of a magazine reporter who goes undercover as a gangster to research the underworld but ends up becoming a mob leader himself; the filming rights to the story had previously been owned by Victor Saville's Parklane Pictures, which produced a television movie for Studio One. Bresler was to produce the film while Grafton was hired to write the screenplay. Douglas immediately offered the lead role to Lancaster, but plans were ultimately made for Douglas to star in A Most Contagious Game, financed by United Artists, with filming to begin in March 1956 on location in New York City. It was also announced that, in addition to Shadow of the Champ, Aurthur would be adapting two more of his stories for Bryna Productions: A Very Special Baby and Spring Reunion. A Very Special Baby was to be the second film co-produced by Bryna Productions in partnership with Jonathan Productions, and the company put up a $100,000 security on the property, which was to be filmed without major studio financing; the completed film would instead be put up for auction to the highest bidder for distribution. Bryna Productions was also to finance the Broadway play version. Spring Reunion, a drama story about a high school reunion, quickly took center stage as the next film to go before cameras, with a scheduled starting date of May 15, 1956, when Robert Pirosh was signed as writer-director, and stars Dana Andrews and Betty Hutton were tied to the production.

By late January 1956, Bryna Productions' previously planned two-pictures-in-1956 schedule had been expanded to five pictures over the next eighteen months, for a total budget of $8,000,000. The Viking (previously announced as The Viking Raiders) was budgeted at $4,000,000 alone for United Artists, while King Kelly was to cost around $1,500,000 for Metro-Goldwyn-Mayer. The remaining $2,500,000 budget from United Artists was to be divided between three other properties already in pre-production stages: Spring Reunion, Shadow of the Champ and A Most Contagious Game. Only a month later, in February 1956, Bryna Productions acquired a sixth property for development in their 1956 schedule: The Silent Gun, for a reported $25,000 (which was factually $22,000). The Silent Gun, a dramatic story about a cowardly man who poses as a famous outlaw, was written by Carson A. Wiley, who was also hired by to write the screenplay. The lead in The Silent Gun was immediately offered to Gary Cooper and Montgomery Clift. That same month, Bryna Productions also signed Italian actress Elsa Martinelli to a four-picture, two-year contract (two pictures a year for two years). In late February 1956, Barney Briskin was appointed Production Manager of Bryna Productions.

Bryna Productions' plans began to delay in March 1956 when Douglas started filming Gunfight at the O.K. Corral on location in Arizona. Each new film in which he accepted to star pushed back Bryna Productions' schedule. In early April 1956, Bryna Productions announced that Lewis Milestone would direct King Kelly on location in Texas, and later that month appointed Charles Levy as Eastern Publicity Representative of the company. That same month, Bryna Productions also optioned the filming rights of the novel Deliver Us from Evil: The Story of Vietnam's Flight to Freedom, the autobiography of Lieutenant Thomas Anthony Dooley III, a navy doctor who served behind the Communist Bamboo Curtain in Vietnam. Douglas was hoping to play the lead and the movie was to begin filming in the late autumn of 1956.

In late May 1956, Bryna Productions' plans changed again when another new property was acquired. A third one-picture deal was set with Metro-Goldwyn-Mayer for the financing and distribution of a film based on Shirley Jackson's novel The Bird's Nest, which Bryna Productions purchased from theater producer Ray Stark. Metro-Goldwyn-Mayer's contracted-actress Eleanor Parker was immediately signed for the lead role in the film which was to be titled Lizzie, with plans to start filming on August 1, 1956, at Kling Studios, though it was delayed to September 10, 1956, with director-actor Hugo Haas. Bette Davis was originally cast in the role of Aunt Morgan, but it was ultimately played by Joan Blondell. Meanwhile, Spring Reunion was also pushed back to start filming on June 4, 1956, at Republic Studios, while King Kelly was scheduled to film on location in East Flat Rock, North Carolina starting July 23, 1956 with Douglas, Elsa Martinelli and Lance Fuller as co-stars. Mala Powers was eventually announced as Martinelli's replacement in King Kelly. Although Douglas was free to start filming, his next picture, Top Secret Affair, only starting to shoot on December 4, 1956, the production team was unhappy with the script of King Kelly and put off the shoot. Screenwriter Edna Anhalt was brought in to work on King Kelly's script.

=== Formation of Michael Productions and Joel Productions (1956–1957) ===
Bryna Productions announced in May 1956 that it had loaned-out Leslie Nielsen from Metro-Goldwyn-Mayer to star in A Most Contagious Game, replacing Douglas who had originally planned to take the lead. In June 1956, Douglas and Bryna Productions began what would be a ten-year partnership with writer-producer Edward Lewis. That month, Bryna Productions acquired Lewis' original story and screenplay, Mavourneen, a comedy about three girls in an Irish town who conspire to trick the town's most eligible bachelor into marrying one of them. Lewis was appointed Associate Producer for both Mavourneen and Lizzie and would become a key member for the organization.

On August 6, 1956, Douglas registered the Bryna Productions subsidiaries Michael Productions, Incorporated, and Joel Productions, Incorporated, named after his first two sons Michael Douglas and Joel Douglas. Although the original plan was to alternate between production companies for each film for tax purposes (as Hecht and Lancaster had done with their film production companies), Michael Productions would only be used for a single film, while Joel Productions remained dormant for the next six years. In September 1956, Bryna Productions announced that the teenage drama The Young Lovers (later released as The Careless Years) had been added to its United Artists-financed schedule of productions and assigned Lewis as Producer. The company initially attempted to loan-out Dennis Hopper for the male lead, but Warner Brothers Pictures' price was too high.

By October 1956, The Viking had again become Douglas' top starring-producing project at Bryna Productions, with a re-written script by Noel Langley; the latter had been hired for the job in June 1956. Its budget had been reduced to $3,000,000 (though it would go over-budget during filming) and it was revealed that it would be filmed authentically in Scandinavian locations during three-and-a-half months in the spring of 1957. In November 1956, Bryna Productions announced interest in acquiring Stephen Longstreet's novel The Beach House, as well as Dale Wasserman and Jack Balch's teleplay Elisha and the Long Knives, as properties for Douglas to star. Also in November 1956, Bryna Productions announced that its new trademark logo had been designed and would first appear in the opening screen credit of Lizzie, due out in early 1957. In December 1956, The Careless Years' lead actors, Dean Stockwell and Natalie Trundy, were both simultaneously signed for the film and to five-year contracts with Bryna Productions. Bryna Productions' second film, Spring Reunion, premiered at the Astoria Theatre in London, England in late December 1956.

The Careless Years began filming on January 7, 1957, with director Arthur Hiller. That month, Bryna Productions re-optioned Ben Hecht's story The Shadow, assigning screenwriter Allan Scott to re-develop it, while Sydney Boehm finished writing the screenplay for A Most Contagious Game, set to co-star Nelson (who also asked Metro-Goldwyn-Mayer to let him play a role in The Viking but was turned down) and Martinelli. The company also announced a three-picture co-production deal with Harris-Kubrick Pictures. Writer-director Stanley Kubrick and his film producer partner James B. Harris had been developing, through their own film production company, a script for Paths of Glory, a World War I drama authored by Humphrey Cobb. Douglas made an exceptional deal with Harris-Kubrick Pictures in which, although he was co-executive producer, he would only be paid a straight salary of $350,000 as an actor and not take in any share of the film's profits (as his deal with United Artists permitted). The addition of Paths of Glory to Bryna Productions' schedule forced The Viking, and also King Kelly which had been re-scripted by Allan Scott, to be pushed back by several months.

Another pre-developed deal tied to Bryna Productions was Burt Arthur's novel Ride Out for Revenge, a western about Indians and the United States Army battling it out. Ride Out for Revenge had already been adapted and scripted by Norman Retchin, who was signed by Bryna Productions as producer for the film in mid-January 1957; Retchin quickly secured Rory Calhoun to play the lead, with co-stars Lloyd Bridges and Gloria Grahame. Myer P. Beck was appointed Sales, Advertisement and Publicity Representative for Bryna Productions in February 1957, just in time for Lizzie's publicity campaign, which rolled out to limited theater screenings that month. After the completion of Spring Reunion, Betty Hutton hoped to star in Three Rings for Julie, a comedy about a switchboard operator who overhears a plot for murder, as her second-contracted picture for Bryna Productions. But after Spring Reunion proved unpopular, Hutton opted not to resume her film-career.

=== Formation of Brynaprod and Peter Vincent Music (1957–1958) ===
Paths of Glory started filming on March 18, 1957, at Bavaria Filmkunst in Geiselgasteig, Germany, while Ride Out for Revenge began shooting on March 28, 1957, with director Bernard Girard on location in Sonora, California. By the end of March 1957, The Viking had officially been retitled The Vikings and big-name stars like Tony Curtis and his wife Janet Leigh (who wound up co-producing the film through their film production company Curtleigh Productions), Ernest Borgnine and Michael Rennie were signed. Leigh was also signed to an additional picture deal with Bryna Productions. The Vikings began shooting using Technirama cameras and Technicolor film on June 20, 1957, on location near the Finnafjorden fjords in Norway, then in Copenhagen, Denmark, followed by Brittany, France, and finally interior scenes at Bavaria Filmkunst in Geiselgasteig, Germany. While in Europe, Bryna Productions looked into the possibility of filming The Shadow in Madrid, Spain, and as so many of the company's projects were set to be done on the continent, Douglas formed a Swiss subsidiary of Bryna Productions, Brynaprod S.A. (a Swiss limited liability Société anonyme). The idea of a European-based company was another influence from Hecht and Lancaster, who had formed the Liechtenstein-based Norma Productions subsidiary Joanna Productions A.G. in 1955 to produce Trapeze in France.

Lewis, running Bryna Productions operations in Hollywood while Douglas was in Europe, negotiated the development of a television series based on The Vikings. In May 1957, a deal was made with Morris Helprin and Alfred W. Crown's film production company, Barbizon Productions, to co-produce a pilot film for a television series to be titled King of the Vikings for Columbia Broadcasting System. Robert Alan Aurthur was contracted to write the teleplay for the pilot, in addition to additional episodes in case the series was picked up. The pilot was filmed in London from August to September 1957 with Crown overseeing the production, but Columbia Broadcasting System did not pickup the series. Bryna Productions then planned to make the television program through a financing and distribution deal with United Artists Television and attempted to sign Sterling Hayden for the lead role. Lewis was later appointed head of Bryna Productions' television department in November 1957.

In September 1957, Bryna Productions moved into a luxurious new building at 250 North Canon Drive in Beverly Hills, California, on the same block as Hecht-Hill-Lancaster Productions' office, which was located at 202 North Canon Drive. The three-story building was designed by architect Herman Charles Light and was shared with producer Martin Melcher and singer-actress Doris Day's film production company Arwin Productions, public relations agency Rogers & Cowan (who would later represent Douglas and Bryna Productions), and law firm Rosenthal & Norton. That same month, The Careless Years was released to theaters.

In October 1957, after Paths of Glory had been privately screened for select members of the press, Bryna Productions optioned American-Canadian church minister-turned-master-safecracker Herbert Emerson Wilsons's autobiography, I Stole $16,000,000, especially for Stanley Kubrick and James B. Harris The picture was to be the second in the co-production deal between Bryna Productions and Harris-Kubrick Pictures, which Kubrick was to write and direct, Harris to co-produce and Douglas to co-produce and star. In November 1957, Gavin Lambert was signed as story editor for I Stole $16,000,000. Ride Out for Revenge was released to theaters in October 1957. Following the success of The Indian Fighter, Ride Out for Revenge marked the fourth film in a row (after Spring Reunion, Lizzie and The Careless Years) to lose money on its investment; nevertheless Douglas had faith in Bryna Productions' future and luckily, so did the financing and distribution companies.

Paths of Glory had its world premiere on October 25, 1957, in Munich, Germany, followed by its American premiere two months later, on December 20, 1957, at the Fine Arts Theater in Beverly Hills, California. It was Bryna Productions biggest success yet and the film went on to win and have nominations for several awards, including the Grand Prix de l'UCC, the Cantaclaro Award for Best American Motion Picture, the Italian National Syndicate of Film Journalists Silver Ribbon for Best Foreign Director, and the Jussi Award for Best Foreign Director. It was also nominated for a BAFTA Award for Best Film from any Source, Adolphe Menjou was nominated for a Golden Laurel Award for Top Male Supporting Performance and the Writers Guild of America Award for Best Written American Drama. In 1992, the United States National Film Preservation Board deemed Paths of Glory "culturally, historically, or aesthetically significant" and selected it for preservation in the Library of Congress' National Film Registry.

In January 1958, Douglas signed on to star and co-produce the film Last Train from Harper's Station with Hal B. Wallis' Wallis-Hazen Productions, through Wallis' existing Paramount Pictures financing and distribution deal. Last Train from Harper's Station was quickly renamed Showdown at Gun Hill when the script was completed. Meanwhile, script meetings were scheduled in Tijuana, Mexico with Herbert Emerson Wilsons, as he had been expelled from the United States and deported to Canada, for the development of his novel I Stole $16,000,000. Stewart Granger was then announced to play the lead in the film, set to start shooting later in 1958. Kubrick eventually finished a script titled God Fearing Man, but the picture was never filmed.

In January 1958, Bryna Productions acquired the filming rights to Edward Abbey's novel The Brave Cowboy. In February 1958, Douglas became attached to The Devil's Disciple, a George Bernard Shaw play which had been optioned by Harold Hecht and Burt Lancaster in August 1955, with plans to film it through their production company Hecht-Lancaster Productions. The picture went through considerable delays and changes, but was originally announced to star Laurence Olivier, Burt Lancaster, Montgomery Clift and Elizabeth Taylor in the leads, with Olivier directing; the picture was to be filmed at a proposed ranch-studio that Hecht-Lancaster Productions was to build in the woodlands of Santa Cruz, California. Douglas came in to replace Clift as one of the leads and agreed to co-star in the film if he could also co-produce it through Bryna Productions. To please Olivier, the film was instead shot in England, and therefore, Brynaprod co-produced the film. Hecht-Lancaster Productions had by this time been renamed Hecht-Hill-Lancaster Productions, and the company also formed a British subsidiary to co-produce the film: Hecht-Hill-Lancaster Films. On February 28, 1958, Douglas registered another subsidiary, Bryna Corporation, though its use has not been established.

In late March 1958, Lewis was appointed Vice-President of Bryna Productions, Margulies was appointed Vice-President of Public Relations Consultants, and the company welcomed three new executives: Seymour Poe as World-Wide Sales Representative, Joseph A. Barry as Eastern Story Editor and Allan Balter as Unit Publicist. German-American film director Robert Siodmak, who had returned to Germany, was appointed European Representative of Bryna Productions, charged as adviser and consultant on the production, distribution and exhibition of all of the company's films in the European market. The addition of the new personnel coincided with Bryna Productions' expansion program and the new representation of the company by talent agency Music Corporation of America. Douglas additionally formed the Bryna Productions subsidiary Peter Vincent Music Corporation, a music publishing company named after his third son, Peter Vincent Douglas. Douglas appointed Martin Melcher as President of Peter Vincent Music, who in turn affiliated the company with performance rights organization Broadcast Music, Inc. in the United States and BUMA in Europe. The purpose of Peter Vincent Music was to publish and copyright the music (theme songs, soundtracks, scores and cues) from Bryna Productions' films and administer royalties to the songwriters and composers; this too was influenced by Hecht and Lancaster's own successful music publishing venture, Hecht-Lancaster & Buzzell Music. Peter Vincent Music's first published and copyrighted music were three songs composed by Mario Nascimbene for The Vikings, which were co-published with United Artist's music publishing imprint, Unart Music. The songs were "March of the Vikings", "Love Has Gone to Wander" and "Commento Musicale Per I Vichinghi", which featured lyrics by Joseph Lubin and arrangements by Jerome Howard.

Bryna Productions also announced in March, 1958 their biggest project yet: a $15,000,000 film production of Jules Verne's adventure novel Michael Strogoff. Verne properties had become viable material in the mid-1950s, Douglas having already co-starred in Walt Disney Productions' 20,000 Leagues Under the Sea, Michael Todd having recently released Around the World in 80 Days, Benedict Bogeaus filming From the Earth to the Moon and Charles Brackett preparing Journey to the Center of the Earth. Michael Strogoff, which takes place in Russia, was to be the subject of the first American-Soviet film co-production, setup jointly through the two nations' cultural exchange program. Douglas was to star in the film, along with as many American actors as the Russians would allow, with the rest of the stars, including the female lead, and cast to be played by Russian actors.

Bryna Productions was adamant about Michael Strogoff's production being fully supported by both governments and a meeting was set up for April 14, 1958 with diplomats and high-ranking country officials. As Douglas was by then busy filming Showdown at Gun Hill, Lewis and Margulies traveled to New York City on behalf of Bryna Productions and met with Eric Johnston, president of the Motion Picture Association of America, Kenneth Clark, vice-president of the Motion Picture Association of America, Turner Blair Shelton, film division chief of the United States Information Agency, Aleksandr A. Slavnov, head of the Soviet delegation, Aleksandr N. Davydov, head of Sovexportfilm, and Tamara Mamedov, cultural attaché for the Soviet Embassy in Washington D.C. The project was met positively and the Soviet officials were given a detailed treatment of the script and a story outline to take back to the U.S.S.R., where it was presented for ratification by top film and government officials in Moscow upon their return in early May 1958. If approved by the second committee, another meeting would be set up in Moscow, likely at the end of May 1958, where the deal would be concluded. Bryna Productions waited for the green-light on the project but it was continuously delayed.

Showdown at Gun Hill started filming on March 31, 1958, using VistaVision cameras and Technicolor film, on location in Arizona with director John Sturges and co-starring Douglas and Anthony Quinn. Regal Films filed an objection with Motion Pictures Association of America's Title Registration Bureau, claiming that Showdown at Gun Hill's title was too similar to their own film Showdown at Boot Hill, which was being released just as the Bryna Productions picture was being filmed. This led to the retitling of the film to Last Train from Gun Hill. In April 1958, Bryna Productions co-purchased William Gibson's stage play Two For the Seesaw with Ray Stark's film production company Seven Arts Productions. The picture was to be co-produced by the two companies with Douglas to play the lead. In mid-April 1958, Melcher secured the releasing and distribution of Peter Vincent Music's The Vikings soundtrack through Dot Records, but less than a month later, it was announced that it would instead be released through United Artists Records.

=== Two-picture deal with Universal-International Pictures (1958–1959) ===
The forthcoming release of The Vikings was to conclude Bryna Productions' six-picture agreement with United Artists; The Devil's Disciple acting as a supplementary picture, already packed under Hecht-Hill-Lancaster Productions' existing United Artists contract. In early May 1958, Bryna Productions signed a one-picture deal with Universal-International Pictures for the financing and distribution of the adventure film Viva, Gringo!. The original story and screenplay by Borden Chase revolved around an American gunslinger who gets caught up in Pancho Villa's revolution in Mexico. With the script already completed, the picture was to have a $2,500,000 budget for authentic location shooting in Mexico, using CinemaScope cameras and Technicolor film. The film was to be co-produced between Lewis and Universal-International Pictures vice-president Edward Muhl and co-star Douglas and Rock Hudson.

Although the original Universal-International Pictures deal only called for a single film, Bryna Productions was already negotiating with the company's president, Milton Rackmil, for the financing and distribution of additional films, as it had done with Loew at Metro-Goldwyn-Mayer. By mid-May 1958, Bryna Productions had secured a second picture deal which was amended to the existing contract. The second Bryna Productions film to be financed and distributed by Universal-International Pictures was to be Spartacus, a historical epic about the Thracian gladiator adapted from Howard Fast's 1951 novel. Bryna Productions had hoped to make the film through United Artists, but the company had turned the project down. When pitched to Universal-International Pictures executives, Spartacus was to be directed by Laurence Olivier, with whom Douglas had become acquainted during the preparation for The Devil's Disciple (co-starring Olivier), with an assemble cast of big names, including Douglas, Olivier, Charles Laughton and Peter Ustinov. Because of the remarkable star-power, Bryna Productions was able to secure a $4,000,000 budget for the production of Spartacus, which was scheduled to start filming in October 1958, also using CinemaScope cameras and Technicolor film, immediately following the completion of The Devil's Disciple in the fall of 1958. Another project which Bryna Productions was developing in 1958 was Nikolai Narokov's newly translated Russian novel The Chains of Fear, a story that takes place behind the Iron Curtain and was to star Ernest Borgnine. In late May 1958, Bryna Productions announced that Tony Curtis had been cast for A Most Contagious Game, and that the film would be co-produced by the actor's film production company, Curtleigh Productions for Universal-International Pictures. A Most Contagious Game was to be filmed in late 1958.

The Vikings premiered in New York on June 12, 1958, at dual cinema houses in New York City: the Victoria Theatre and the Astor Theatre, which were side by side and took up a full block on Broadway between West 45th Street and West 46th Street. To promote the event, Bryna Productions commissioned the largest and costliest theater marquee-billboard advertisement ever manufactured at the time; a 261-foot long (22,825 square feet), three-dimensional, electrically articulated spectacular that extended across the entire block, hanging across the façade of both theaters. The billboard, which included 6,000 light bulbs, a 52-foot sail and eleven moving oars, alone cost $105,000 to make, which was included in United Artists' $2,000,000 advertising and publicity campaign budget allocated for the picture during the summer of 1958. The film then premiered in Los Angeles on June 19, 1958, at the Fox-Wilshire Theater; this movie house, too, was decorated with Norse-theme articles for a cost of $4,000, followed by an after-party for over 200 guests, Hollywood celebrities and members of the press. The film premiered in London on July 8, 1958, at the Leicester Square Theatre and was attended by Prince Philip, and the movie was also screened at a handful of European film festivals, including the San Sebastián International Film Festival in Spain and the Brussels World Film Festival in Belgium.

The Vikings became one of the most successful films of 1958; it was one of the biggest money-makers of the year and was bestowed several awards. It received a Golden Laurel Award for Top Action Drama, the San Sebastián International Film Festival awarded it the Zulueta Prize, and the Directors Guild of America nominated it for Outstanding Directorial Achievement in Motion Pictures. United Artists Records also released a soundtrack LP of Mario Nascimbene's original score performed by Hal Schaefer's Orchestra.

The amount of Douglas-focused publicity surrounding The Vikings, in which the actor was given credit for practically making the film on his own, lead to Bresler's departure as Producer and General Manager of Bryna Productions after three years with the company. Bresler explained that there was no enmity between him and Douglas, but that he felt more like his stooge than his partner. Bresler noted that the issue lay more in the way filmmaking was written about by members of the press and perceived by the public once an actor became an executive producer and owner of an independent film production company, which in turn led to important personnel in the film projects being left uncredited. Bresler noted that posters and advertisements for The Vikings read "A Kirk Douglas Production", while Bresler had in fact produced the film through Bryna Productions. Bresler immediately formed his own film production company, Jerry Bresler Productions, and offered Douglas the lead in either one of his first two planned productions: Peer Gynt and The Old Man's Place. United Artists president Krim additionally revealed, a year later, that Douglas had deliberately exaggerated the film's cost as a publicity stunt (as Hecht-Lancaster Productions had done two years prior to publicize Trapeze). Douglas and Margulies, through their press relations firm Public Relations Consultants, had told the press that The Vikings had gone overbudget by more than a million dollars, bringing the total cost of production, publicity and releasing the film to over $6,000,000; Krim corrected the figure to a final cost of $3,400,000, based on an agreed budget of $3,250,000.

In June 1958, Lewis announced that Bryna Productions had secured a financing and distribution deal with United Artists Television for the production of 39 episodes for the company's first television program, The Vikings (the title King of the Vikings had been dropped). Instead of filming another pilot (which had failed to garner interest in 1957), the company instead screened The Vikings feature film to entice sponsors and explained that the television show would be shot in the same film studio in Germany and make use of the same sets, costumes and props (in which Bryna Productions had invested $300,000).

Douglas remained in England after the London opening of The Vikings to work on The Devil's Disciple, which began filming on July 28, 1958, with director Alexander Mackendrick at Associated British Elstree Studios and on location at Dyrham Park, Hertfordshire in England. Lead producer Hecht was however unhappy about Mackendrick's direction and replaced him with Guy Hamilton in August 1958. In July 1958, Bryna Productions announced that it had acquired Ray Bradbury's services as a teleplay writer for a new television series titled Report from Space (or Report from Outer Space) for National Broadcasting Company. The half-hour episode program was to center around science fiction stories developed by Bradbury, adapted mainly from stories published in his two novels, The Illustrated Man and The Martian Chronicles. Bradbury was appointed Story Editor of the series and was to write teleplays for a quarter of each season's episodes, with John Fulton producing the show. MCA tried to sell the show but there were no takers.

In September 1958, while Douglas was still in England shooting The Devil's Disciple, Bryna Productions' vice-president Lewis announced that the company would be filming a biopic of Simón Bolívar, to be titled The Adventures of Simon Bolivar, or Simon Bolivar the Liberator, with Douglas likely to play the lead. Veteran film director-producer Cecil B. DeMille objected to Bryna Productions making a picture on the subject, claiming it had "reserved" the rights to a similar story back in 1938, though DeMille had no current plans to develop the story. DeMille passed away only five months later, and although Bryna Productions had hoped to film Simón Bolívar's story by the end of 1959, the project never came to fruition. Lewis also appointed George M. Cahan as producer-director and Elmo Williams (who had been second unit director on The Vikings) as director and supervising editor of The Vikings television show. Cahan, in turn, hired Talbot Jennings, Robert Blees, George W. George, Lorraine Williams, Bob Mitchell, Fred Freiberger, DeWitt Bodeen, William Edmund Barrett and Sidney Morse to write the teleplays.

In early November 1958, Bryna Productions announced its forthcoming production plans, which included eleven films and three television series to be made for a total budget of $30,000,000 over the next three-to-four years. In addition to the previously-announced Spartacus, Viva, Gringo!, The Adventures of Simon Bolivar, Michael Strogoff, The Brave Cowboy, The Silent Gun, A Most Contagious Game and The Shadow, Bryna Productions added And the Rock Cried Out, The Indian Wars and The Sun at Midnight to its film production schedule, together budgeted at $25,000,000. And the Rock Cried Out, an original science fiction novel by Ray Bradbury, had been in circulation for some time. British director Carol Reed had optioned the property in the mid-1950s and brought it over to Hecht-Hill-Lancaster Productions in May 1957 as his second directorial task for the company (following Trapeze). Reed and Bradbury developed a screenplay together, which was ultimately acquired by Bryna Productions in 1958 with plans to film on location in Mexico. The Sun at Midnight, an original story and screenplay developed by Lewis, was set in the far north amongst the Eskimos, while The Indian Wars was a western. A Most Contagious Game was still under development with Curtis, but was pushed back as his third picture for Bryna Productions following The Vikings and Spartacus, while Verne's Michael Strogoff picture budget had been reduced from $15,000,000 to $7,500,000. The remaining $5,000,000 budget was to be divided between three television series: the previously announced The Vikings and Report from Space, and the newly announced The Indian Fighter, adapted from Bryna Productions' 1955 feature film, set to star John Ireland. In January 1959, Bryna Productions' three-year option on A Most Contagious Game expired and the filming rights were scooped up by Dick Clark. Curtis would later option the property for development through his own film production company, Curtis Enterprises; that version of the film would also never be made.

Spartacus began filming on January 5, 1959, using CinemaScope cameras and Technicolor film, in California with director Anthony Mann, while Bryna Productions' inaugural television show, Tales of the Vikings, setup production in black and white at Bavaria Filmkunst in Geiselgasteig, Germany with Jerome Courtland in the lead; both productions would film for fourteen months. On February 16, 1959, after a full month of location shooting in Death Valley, California, followed by four days at Universal Studios, Mann quit the production due to artistic differences; Douglas quickly called Kubrick (who had just been fired as director of One-Eyed Jacks) to step in as Spartacus' new director. In February 1959, Bryna Productions reported that Spartacus had gone $1,000,000 over its planned $5,000,000 budget; a figure that doubled to $2,000,000 by mid-April 1957. The amount overspent had increased to $4,000,000 by mid-July, and in August, Douglas and Margulies, through Public Relations Consultants, reported that the company had spent twice its intended budget, bringing the picture up to a cost of $10,000,000 and naming it the most expensive picture ever filmed in Hollywood. The press was however skeptical of these financial claims, since Bryna Productions had already been exposed for exaggerating its production costs as a publicity stunt for The Vikings the year prior. During the filming of Spartacus at Universal Studios, the production company invested in a 60-foot wide, double-tube neon sign, which was logically installed on top of a Roman temple set that overlooked the Hollywood Freeway in San Fernando Valley, in such a way that nearby drivers would have no choice but be informed of the upcoming film.

Last Train from Gun Hill premiered in early July 1959 at the Capitol Theatre in New York City. The film did fairly well at the box office and Anthony Quinn was later nominated for a Golden Laurel Award for Top Action Performance. Later that month, Margulies was named executive producer of Tales of the Vikings and traveled to Germany to oversee the production with directors Cahan, Williams, Steve Previn and Michael Braun. Also in July 1959, Bryna Productions showed interest in filming Milton Berle and John Roeburt's novel Earthquake, a drama about a group of individuals who get stranded in Mexico when an earthquake hits. The Devil's Disciple premiered on August 20, 1959, at dual theaters (like The Vikings) the Normandie Theatre and the Astor Theatre in New York City, by which time the film's co-production company, Hecht-Hill-Lancaster Productions had called it quits. The film later earned Olivier a BAFTA nomination for Best British Actor. Tales of the Vikings did not premiere on a network but instead went straight to syndication, with broadcasts starting in early September 1959, while additional shows continued to be filmed until February 1960.

In April 1959, Bryna Productions announced that it had acquired Vechel Howard's novel Sundown at Crazy Hose, scheduled to be filmed under the title Day of the Gun as part of a third one-picture financing and distribution deal with Universal-International Pictures. The film was given the same production qualities as the planned Viva, Gringo!, also set to star Douglas and be filmed in widescreen and color. By December 1959, Viva, Gringo! had been abandoned in favor of Day of the Gun, and Rock Hudson was assigned to the new picture, with Robert Aldrich tied as director, and Eugene Frenke and Lewis co-producing.

=== Negotiations with Columbia Pictures and additional deals with Universal-International Pictures (1959–1961) ===
Bryna Productions had earlier in 1958 negotiated with Columbia Pictures for a financing and distribution deal of a film titled Two-Headed Spy, based on a development of an earlier project titled The Syndicate. In September 1959, Douglas signed on to star in and co-produce Richard Quine's drama Strangers When We Meet, financed and to be distributed by Columbia Pictures. The film co-starred Kim Novak and Ernie Kovacs and was the first movie produced through Quine's new film production company, Quine Productions (co-producing with Bryna Productions). The Beach Boys, a Hawaii-based story scripted by Blake Edwards to co-start Tony Curtis, in early 1958, was announced as the second Columbia Pictures-financed Bryna Productions film, which would be co-produced by Curtis' Curtleigh Productions. Strangers When We Meet began filming in October 1959, using CinemaScope cameras and Eastman Color film, in various locations of California. Douglas' real-life sons Peter and Eric had small parts in the film. In December 1959, Bryna Productions registered the titles War Between the Gods, War of the Gods and War of Two Gods for upcoming projects.

In mid-February 1960, Bryna Productions announced that it would make the film Montezuma as part of a new Universal-International Pictures one-picture financing and distribution deal. The plot was to be a semi-fictional story, based partly on Bernal Díaz del Castillo's memoire The True History of the Conquest of New Spain, revolving around Spanish conquistador Hernán Cortés taking Aztec Emperor Moctezuma II prisoner and using the latter to conquest Mexico. Following Spartacus, Viva, Gringo! and The Hot Eye of Heaven, Montezuma was the company's fourth film to secure a deal with Universal-International Pictures. Philip Yordan was originally announced as the screenwriter for the project, though it was later revealed that he was fronting for Dalton Trumbo, who had been working on several Bryna Productions projects.

In early March 1960, John Huston was approached to direct Trumbo's Montezuma script, and the film was to be co-produced by Lewis and Frenke. Douglas was to co-star as Cortés with Rock Hudson playing the role of Moctezuma II, following the pair's chemistry during the filming of The Hot Eye of Heaven. Montezuma was planned to be filmed through Brynaprod, entirely on location in Mexico during the first half of 1961, with a budget comparable to Spartacus', which foresaw the cost of fully rebuilding a replica of Moctezuma's Tenochtitlan city. The film was already being advertised to the press as a superpic, targeted for roadshow screenings.

In early April 1960, Linn Unkefer was appointed Publicity Director of Public Relations Consultants by Margulies, set to begin the promotion of the forthcoming film Day of the Gun, while Margulies was tied-up promoting Spartacus. Day of the Gun started three months of filming, using Eastman Color film, on location in Mexico on May 11, 1960. As the film was being produced outside the United States, Bryna Productions produced the movie through its Swiss subsidiary, Brynaprod. By May 1960, the film's title had been changed to The Hot Eye of Heaven.

Strangers When We Meet premiered on June 29, 1960, at dual theater houses: the Criterion Theatre in New York City and the Trans-Lux Theatre in Washington D.C. At screenings, the movie was preceded by a half-hour promotional film of the actual building of the house featured prominently in the picture.

Spartacus had its world premiere on October 6, 1960, at the DeMille Theatre in New York City, using a special "roadshow print"; Super Technirama 70 film and cameras projected on spherical (curved) screens with a magnetic six-track stereophonic soundtrack. The film premiere was advertised by a 90-foot high, 88-foot wide billboard-marquee erected above the DeMille Theatre, which utilized over 10,000 light bulbs. By this time, Public Relations Consultants were reporting the film as having cost $12,000,000. The roadshow print then had local premiere screenings in Chicago, Los Angeles, Boston, Detroit, Philadelphia, Cleveland, Pittsburgh and Cincinnati, with an additional fifteen premieres in foreign countries. Subsequent screenings, once the film opened to general public theaters, would be shown on 35 mm film prints with a monaural soundtrack.

Spartacus was one of the biggest box office success of 1960, 1961 and 1962 and went on to win several accolades. The film won four Academy Awards and was nominated for an additional two: Peter Ustinov won an Academy Award for Best Actor in a Supporting Role, Russell Metty won an Academy Award for Best Cinematography, Color, Alexander Golitzen, Eric Orbom, Russell A. Gausman and Julia Heron shared an Academy Award for Best Art Direction-Set Decoration, Color, Arlington Valles and Bill Thomas shared an Academy Award for Best Costume Design, Robert Lawrence was nominated for an Academy Award for Best Film Editing and Alex North was nominated for an Academy Award for Best Music, Scoring of a Dramatic or Comedy Picture. The film won a Golden Globe Award and was nominated for an addition five: the film itself won a Golden Globe Award for Best Motion Picture – Drama, Kubrick was nominated for a Golden Globe Award for Best Director, Olivier was nominated for a Golden Globe Award for Best Actor – Motion Picture Drama, Ustinov and Woody Strode were each nominated for a Golden Globe Award for Best Supporting Actor, and Alex North was nominated for a Golden Globe Award for Best Original Score. Kubrick was also nominated for a BAFTA Award for Best Film from any Source, Douglas was nominated for a Golden Laurel Award for Top Male Dramatic Performance and Ustinov was nominated for a Golden Laurel Award for Top Male Supporting Performance. The Motion Picture Sound Editors awarded the film a Golden Reel Award for Best Sound Editing - Feature Film, while the Writers Guild of America nominated Dalton Trumbo for an Award for Best Written American Drama. In 2017, the United States National Film Preservation Board deemed Spartacus "culturally, historically, or aesthetically significant" and selected it for preservation in the Library of Congress' National Film Registry.

Although Douglas hinted in interviews that he had no desire to produce a television series based on Spartacus, a pilot episode titled "The Wooden Sword" was scripted by Cyril Hume, dated April 1959. In November 1960, Bryna Production announced it would next be filming Edward Abbey's novel The Brave Cowboy in mid-1961, under the title The Last Hero, for a modest budget of under $1,000,000. The picture was to star Douglas and be produced and directed by Lewis; at the time, no financing or distribution deal had been set but Bryna Productions hoped to secure a deal with Universal-International Pictures.

=== Six-picture deal with Universal-International Pictures (1961–1963) ===
In January 1961, after six years as Publicity Director of Bryna Productions and Vice-President of Public Relations Consultants, Margulies left the company to join Curtleigh Productions as its new vice-president. Later that month, it was reported that Douglas and Lewis were in negotiations with 20th Century-Fox Film, but the pair instead secured a six-picture financing and distribution deal between Universal-International Pictures and the newly activated Bryna Productions subsidiary Joel Productions, which had been registered in August 1956 and was named after Douglas' second son Joel Douglas. The six-picture deal retroactively included Montezuma and The Last Hero, which had both been discussed with the major studio in 1960.

In February 1961, Bryna Productions announced that it would be filming Montezuma in Hollywood instead of Mexico. While early announcements had given talk to opposition from the Mexican government and competition from Mexican film producers, the reason for switching to an American-made film was motivated by President John F. Kennedy's speech to buy American to combat the country's gold deficit. Director John Huston was then re-writing the screenplay and the company was attempting to secure Marlon Brando for the role of Moctezuma II, with a budget of $10,000,000. The company also announced that month that it had acquired Philip MacDonald's mystery novel The List of Adrian Messenger, planned for an early 1962 shooting with Alec Coppel writing the screenplay. Lewis would produce the film as part of Universal-International Pictures' six-picture financing and distribution deal.

The Last Hero began filming with director David Miller on May 1, 1961, using Panavision cameras with black and white film, on location at Paradise Hills, New Mexico, followed by additional photography in the Sandia Mountains, east of Albuquerque. Douglas' eldest, sixteen year old Michael, who aspired to be an actor, spent the summer working on the film doing various jobs to learn the business. The Hot Eye of Heaven was again retitled, this time to The Last Sunset, and premiered on June 8, 1961, at dual theaters in New York City: the Palace Theatre and the Trans-Lux 85th Street Theatre. Although it received mixed reviews, the film did well at the box office and Douglas was nominated for a Golden Laurel Award for Top Action Performance. After the completion of The Last Hero, which was retitled Lonely Are the Brave, Miller directed a new trailer for Spartacus, the purpose of which was to promote a relaunch of the film, a year after its inaugural release, to smaller film houses.

In mid-August 1961, Lewis traveled to Mexico for two weeks of location scouting for Montezuma, which had been retitled Savages. Upon his return, Brynaprod announced that Savages would be filmed entirely in Mexico, on location in Cuernavaca and at Churubusco Studios, starting October 1961. Mexican producer Olallo Rubio was to be tied to the production and help in securing the crew necessary on the forthcoming multi-million dollar epic picture. Rubio revealed that although the Mexican film production staff was eager to give Douglas and Lewis the red carpet treatment and push for the making of the film, the Mexican Film Bureau still needed to approve of the script.

In January 1962, Charles Schnee was recruited to rewrite The List of Adrian Messenger. A month later, in early February 1962, it was announced that Joel Productions had purchased the stage and filming rights to Ken Kesey's novel One Flew Over the Cuckoo's Nest, less than a week after it had been published. The property was one of Douglas' most treasured acquisition and, on par with The Shadow, would be the project which he attempted to bring to the screen for the longest period of time. Douglas immediately planned to star in both the stage and screen versions of the novel and first hired William Peter Blatty, then Dale Wasserman, to adapt the stage play and screenplay. George Roy Hill was also to direct both the stage play and the filmed version, with Joel Productions planning to enter the legitimate theater by producing the stage version prior to the motion picture. Also in February 1962, Bryna Productions and Rod Serling's film production company, Cayuga Productions, began looking into co-producing a film together.

The addition of One Flew Over the Cuckoo's Nest to the company's schedule brought the total number of active productions to six, which were planned to be filmed between 1962 and 1963. The company hoped to make The List of Adrian Messenger, set to start in the spring of 1962 through Joel Productions, One Flew Over the Cuckoo's Nest, as a play in late 1962, followed by the film in early 1963, also through Joel Productions, Montezuma, scheduled to be filmed in late 1963 through Brynaprod (indicating it would likely be filmed outside the United States, and in Mexico, once again), and two additional films to be produced through Joel Productions without Douglas starring, for release in 1962 and 1963.

Lonely Are the Brave premiered at the Majestic Theatre in Huston, Texas on May 24, 1962. The film was a success and the Motion Picture Sound Editors awarded it a Golden Reel Award for Best Sound Editing - Feature Film. Douglas was also nominated for a BAFTA Award for Best Foreign Actor and a Golden Laurel Award for Top Action Performance. In early August 1962, Brynaprod announced that Nick Adams had been cast as Douglas' co-star in Montezuma. The List of Adrian Messenger began shooting with director John Huston at Elstree Studios in England, in early September 1962, followed by select location filming in Europe. It was also announced in September 1962 that Douglas, Lewis, writer Rod Serling and director John Frankenheimer had formed a new partnership, under Joel Productions' flagship, and together purchased the filming rights to Fletcher Knebel and Charles W. Bailey II's novel Seven Days in May, days before it was published. Seven Days in May, to be co-produced through Joel Productions, Cayuga Productions and the newly-formed John Frankenheimer Productions, marked the first of eight pictures directed by Frankenheimer and produced by Lewis. On December 24, 1962, Peter Vincent Music was dissolved and merged into Bryna Productions. In February 1963, Joel Productions announced that Douglas, Lancaster and Spencer Tracy would co-star in Seven Days in May. A month later, however, the company revealed that Fredric March had replaced Tracy, who exited the project after arguments over receiving sole top-billing.

=== Four-picture and one-play deal with Seven Arts Productions and formation of Eric Productions (1963) ===
In mid-April 1963, it was announced that Joel Productions had secured a four motion picture and one theatrical play financing deal with Seven Arts Productions, the latter of which would also be responsible for securing the distribution of the films. While Seven Arts Productions had originally started as an independent film production company in the 1950s, it had grown considerably and was then a non-distributing financing unit, funding outside pictures. The pact started with Seven Days in May, which was to be co-produced by Joel Productions and Frankenheimer's new film production company, John Frankenheimer Productions, and be distributed by Paramount Pictures. The two companies would next stage the theatrical production of One Flew Over the Cuckoo's Nest in late 1963, followed by the film version, planned to be directed by Sidney Lumet in early 1964. While the remaining two film property options in the agreement were not selected at the time of the announcement, one was later revealed to be Seconds, to be filmed in mid-1964.

In early May 1963, Brynaprod announced that Montezuma would begin filming on location in Mexico, with a budget of $11,000,000, in January 1964. Set to co-star in the film were Douglas as Hernán Cortés, Yul Brynner (who was to co-produce the picture) as Moctezuma II and Sophia Loren as La Malinche; the role of Cuauhtémoc was to be given to a noted Mexican actor. The film was to be the most expensive motion picture ever filmed in Mexico and its production had been approved by the Mexican government.

Seven Days in May began shooting at Paramount Studios on May 15, 1963, followed by several key locations in Washington D.C., San Diego, California, Arizona and Virginia. The List of Adrian Messenger premiered on May 29, 1963, at dual theaters in New York City: the Warner Theatre and the Trans-Lux 52nd Street Theatre, followed by a Memorial Day weekend nationwide opening. The film was highly publicized and did well at the box office; it was also nominated for an Edgar Allan Poe Award for Best Motion Picture.

In July 1963, Joel Productions announced that it had acquired David Ely's novel Seconds for $175,000, in cooperation with John Frankenheimer Productions. The production team immediately hired Lewis John Carlino to write the screenplay, with Douglas set to play the lead, and planned for a March 1964 shooting. In mid-October 1963, it was reported that Lewis and Frankenheimer would team up for a one-off picture deal for The Mirisch Corporation. The Confessor was to star Anthony Perkins (later replaced by Tony Curtis) and Henry Fonda, from a screenplay by Carlino based on Jackson Donahue's novel of the same name. It was to be Lewis' first project outside of the Bryna Productions umbrella since 1956; the project would however never make it to film.

Although the stage version of One Flew Over the Cuckoo's Nest was originally to be produced directly through Joel Productions, Douglas and Lewis formed a new Bryna Productions subsidiary, Eric Productions, Incorporated, named after Douglas' fourth and youngest son, Eric Douglas. The play was co-produced by Seven Arts Productions, which put up the $175,000 bankroll, and Broadway theatrical producer David Merrick, and was directed by Alex Segal. One Flew Over the Cuckoo's Nest opened off-Broadway at the Shubert Theatre in New Haven, Connecticut on October 24, 1963, running for three performances until October 26, 1963. It then opened at the Shubert Theatre in Boston, Massachusetts on October 28, 1963, running for thirteen performances until November 9, 1963. The troupe was originally planning to perform for a week at the Fisher Theatre in Detroit, Michigan, but the engagement was cancelled. The play finally opened on Broadway at the Cort Theatre on November 13, 1963, where it ran for 82 performances until January 25, 1964. Douglas had anticipated the play to do well and rented a luxurious apartment in Manhattan for his family during its run, but the reviewers were divided; Douglas universally received favorable praise for his performance, but the play itself was generally disliked, which in turn soured the major studios from wanting to invest in a film version. The remaining three pictures as part of the Seven Arts Productions deal would never be made.

=== Three-picture deal with Paramount Pictures and formation of Douglas and Lewis Productions (1963–1965) ===
In December 1963, Douglas' company was restructured, which resulted with the formation of Douglas and Lewis Productions. Lewis was welcomed as a full partner in the corporation as part of a seven-year agreement with Douglas. The new film production unit was filed as a subsidiary of the newly established umbrella corporation Kirk Douglas Enterprises, which oversaw the former assets of Bryna Productions, Brynaprod, Michael Productions, Joel Productions, Eric Productions, Peter Vincent Music and Public Relations Consultants. Milton Shapiro, formerly an executive for Hecht-Hill-Lancaster Productions and Secretary of Bryna Productions, was appointed Treasurer of Kirk Douglas Enterprises.

The new company announced a $15,000,000 1964–1965 program for the production of motion pictures, stage plays, television series and other commercial interests, all to be made directly through Douglas and Lewis Productions. The films announced on the production schedule included Seconds, to begin filming in June 1964 with director-co-producer Frankenheimer and starring Douglas, One Flew Over the Cuckoo's Nest, to start filming in late 1964 with Douglas in the lead, and Montezuma, which would cost between $10–12,000,000 and would be filmed in 1965. Ken Kesey was additionally commissioned to write an original story for screen adaptation. Douglas and Lewis Productions also planned to prolong the stage production of One Flew Over the Cuckoo's Nest with engagements on the West Coast and in England, but with another actor replacing Douglas in the lead.

Following exhibitor screenings during the first week of December 1963, Seven Days in May premiered on February 12, 1964. The film had a special cameo appearance by Douglas and Lewis Productions secretary Maggie Smith, whose picture appears on Fredric March's desk as the president's wife. Seven Days in May was the company's biggest success since Spartacus four years prior, and the picture went on to win several accolades. It was nominated for two Academy Awards: one for Edmond O'Brien for Best Actor in a Supporting Role, another for Cary Odell and Edward G. Boyle for Best Art Direction-Set Decoration, Black and White. Edmond O'Brien won a Golden Globe Award for Best Supporting Actor, while Fredric March was nominated for Best Actor – Motion Picture Drama, Frankenheimer was nominated for Best Director and Jerry Goldsmith was nominated for Best Original Score. The Writers Guild of America nominated Serling for Best Written American Drama, while the Golden Laurel Awards nominated Lancaster for Top Male Dramatic Performance and the film itself for Top Drama. Frankenheimer received a Boxoffice Blue Ribbon Award for Best Picture of the Month and a Bodil Award for Best Non-European Film, and March won a David di Donatello Award for Best Foreign Actor.

In late February 1964, Douglas and Lewis Productions announced that a three-picture financing and distribution deal had been signed with Paramount Pictures. Douglas was to star in two of the three properties, the first of which was to be Seconds, set to go into pre-production in March 1964, once Douglas returned from a European trip promoting Seven Days in May. While the two other properties as part of the Paramount Pictures deal were not immediately set, Montezuma was quickly added as the sophomore project, while the third picture was to be determined at a later time. Plans to film Seconds were first delayed when Douglas accepted to appear in In Harm's Way for director-producer Otto Preminger, and again when he began filming The Heroes of Telemark for director Anthony Mann on location in Rjukan, Norway. Meanwhile, Lewis continued to develop film properties with Frankenheimer.

In November 1964, after months of development, Douglas and Lewis Productions announced that it would be co-producing Grand Prix with John Frankenheimer Productions. Grand Prix, a drama about the turbulent lives of racecar drivers, was to be directed by Frankenheimer, using the new Cinerama single-lens process, and based on an original screenplay by Carlino. Due to further outside commitments, Douglas' participation with Douglas and Lewis Productions was reduced considerably. He spent most of 1965 filming in Europe, first in France for producer Paul Graetz's Transcontinental Films production Is Paris Burning?, then in Italy and Israel for writer-director-producer Melville Shavelson's Cast a Giant Shadow, which was co-produced through Shavelson's Llenroc Productions, John Wayne's Batjac Productions and the Mirisch brothers' The Mirisch Corporation.

=== One-picture deals with Metro-Goldwyn-Mayer and Warner Brothers Pictures (1965–1966) ===
By February 1965, Rock Hudson had been signed for the lead in Seconds as a co-production between Douglas and Lewis Productions, John Frankenheimer Productions and Hudson's Gibraltar Productions, while Grand Prix was to star Douglas, Lancaster and Shirley MacLaine as a co-production between Douglas and Lewis Productions, John Frankenheimer Productions and Lancaster's Norlan Productions. In March 1965, Lewis and Frankenheimer began the negotiation for a one-picture financing and distribution deal for Grand Prix with Metro-Goldwyn-Mayer. It would take until September 1965 for the contracts to be signed.

It was also announced in March 1965 that Douglas and Lewis Productions and John Frankenheimer Productions had together purchased the filming rights to Robert Daley's photo-documentary book The Cruel Sport. The property was planned to be made into a television pictures series to parallel Grand Prix; both were to be filmed at the same time, in the same manner as The Vikings and Tales of the Vikings had been produced. The television series, however, became questionable when John Sturges' Alpha Productions and Steve McQueen's Solar Productions threatened a lawsuit, claiming they had already purchased the rights to the novel and planned to make their own picture about auto racing. In May 1965, the production team signed an exclusive two-year contract with all of the official European Grand Prix racing circuits and European Endurance racing circuits. The deal gave Douglas and Lewis Productions and John Frankenheimer Productions the exclusive filming rights of the races and the use of the tracks during the off-season. Sturges and McQueen's film was thence delayed by several years and was eventually made as Le Mans (released in 1971).

Seconds began filming on June 14, 1965, at Paramount Studios, followed by location shooting in Malibu and the Pacific Coast Highway in California and in New York City and Scarsdale in New York. By September 1965, when the Metro-Goldwyn-Mayer contract for Grand Prix was finally concluded, Robert Alan Aurthur had replaced Carlino as screenwriter and Hudson was approached to play one of the leads in the $9,000,000-budgeted film. Douglas had pulled out from co-starring in Grand Prix in favor of appearing in The Way West for Harold Hecht, a western project which Hecht-Lancaster Productions had been developing since late 1953, and The War Wagon for John Wayne's Batjac Productions.

In October 1965, Douglas and Lewis Productions announced that it had secured a one-picture financing and distribution deal with Warner Brothers Pictures for The Hoods. The Hoods (later released as The Brotherhood), was an original screenplay by Carlino about the mafia and was to star Douglas. Lewis was to produce the film while Martin Ritt would direct and co-produce through his film production company, Martin Ritt Productions. In November 1965, Albert Maltz's original screenplay Bar Silver, loosely based on Robert Lewis Stevenson's Treasure Island, was completed and delivered to Bryna Productions. Bar Silver would go through several rewrites by Douglas, Sid Fleischman and Richard Freed, and titles, including The Rascals and Scalawag, before it was filmed. Another property acquired around this time was Yukio Mishima's The Sailor Who Fell From Grace With the Sea, with Carlino assigned to write the screenplay. Ten years later, Carlino would direct the film, with no ties to Bryna Productions.

Seconds premiered on May 16, 1966, at the Cannes International Film Festival, where it competed as the United States' film entry and was nominated for a Palme D'Or. The film later opened to American theaters in September 1966 and was well received by the press and public. Hudson was nominated for a Bambi Award for Best Actor - International while James Wong Howe was nominated for an Academy Award for Best Cinematography, Black and White. In 2015, the United States National Film Preservation Board deemed Seconds "culturally, historically, or aesthetically significant" and selected it for preservation in the Library of Congress' National Film Registry.

In February 1966, James Garner was signed as the American lead in Grand Prix, through a deal where his independent film production company, Cherokee Productions, would co-produce the film. The rest of the cast boasted international stars, including Toshiro Mifune, Yves Montand, Eva Marie Saint and Brian Bedford. In April 1966, Douglas and Lewis Productions acquired James William Drought's novel The Gypsy Moths and hired David Heilweil to write the screenplay, planning for Douglas to star in the picture. Grand Prix began filming on May 22, 1966, using Cinerama single-lens process cameras and Metrocolor film, entirely on location in Europe. The authentic locations included the Monaco Grand Prix in Monte Carlo, the Italian Grand Prix in Monza, the Belgian Grand Prix in Spa, the Dutch Grand Prix in Zandvoort, the British Grand Prix in Kent, the French Grand Prix in Reims, the 24 Hours of Le Mans in Le Mans, France, the Targa Florio in Sicily and the Nürburgring 24 Hours in Nürburgring, Germany. Meanwhile, in the United States, Douglas arranged a co-production deal between Joel Productions and Malcolm Stuart's film production company, Coldwater Productions, to film Scalawag on location in Texas during the autumn of 1966 after wrapping up The Way West. Stuart also planned to move Coldwater Productions' offices to Paramount Studios' lot in order to facilitate work on the picture and be near Douglas and Lewis Productions.

=== Departure of Edward Lewis and continuation of Bryna Productions (1966–1970) ===
Once the shooting on Grand Prix was completed, Douglas and Lewis cancelled their seven-year pact and dissolved Douglas and Lewis Productions. The film would still be released with the pair's former company credited and, as planned, Joel Productions filed the copyrights for the picture. Douglas continued to produce through Bryna Productions and Joel Productions while Lewis formed his own independent film production company, Edward Lewis Productions. Both teams retained offices in Paramount Studios' lot. In mid-December 1966, Douglas restructured the company and announced Lewis' successor; he appointed Eleanor Wolquitt as Administrative Head and Story Editor of Bryna Productions. Wolquitt, who had previously worked for Four Star International, Metro-Goldwyn-Mayer and 20th Century-Fox Film, was charged with finding and acquiring new story properties for development and assumed her new position on January 15, 1967.

Grand Prix had its gala world premiere simultaneously in New York City and Tokyo, Japan on December 21, 1966. The New York premiere was held at the Warner Cinerama Theatre, while the West Coast premiere was held at the Pacific Cinerama Dome Theatre in Los Angeles the next day, on December 22, 1966. The film was presented in a special "roadshow print", projected using 70mm film on curved Cinerama screens with a six-track stereophonic soundtrack. The film then opened to other Cinerama theaters in the world during late 1966 and early 1967. Grand Prix was a huge success and won three Academy Awards: Franklin Milton won one for Best Sound, Gordon Daniel won one for Best Effects, Sound Effects, and Fredric Steinkamp, Henry Berman, Stu Linder and Frank Santillo shared one for Best Film Editing. Frankenheimer was nominated for a Directors Guild of America Award for Outstanding Directorial Achievement in Motion Pictures, Steinkamp, Berman, Linder and Santillo were nominated for an American Cinema Editors Award for Best Edited Feature Film, and Antonio Sabato and Jessica Walter were each nominated for Golden Globe Awards for Most Promising Newcomer.

In January 1967, Douglas and Lewis each announced their separate plans. Edward Lewis Productions and John Frankenheimer Productions together signed a four-picture financing and distribution deal with Metro-Goldwyn-Mayer, for the production of several films which had been developed earlier, during the Douglas and Lewis Productions era. Lewis and Frankenheimer went on to co-produce five films together, including The Fixer, The Extraordinary Seaman and The Gypsy Moths, as part of their Metro-Goldwyn-Mayer pact, followed by I Walk the Line and The Horsemen, as part of a subsequent pact with Columbia Pictures.

Douglas held a press conference at his Beverly Hills home announcing that Bryna Productions' immediate development schedule included three films: the outdoor adventure-swashbuckler Bar Silver, to be filmed on location in Texas and Mexico, the mafia story The Hoods, to be filmed on location in New York and Sicily, and the long-anticipated adventure-spectacle Montezuma, to be filmed partly on location in Mexico and partly in studio in Hollywood. By this time, Warner Brothers Pictures' option on The Hoods had expired and Montezuma was no longer backed by Universal Pictures; Bryna Productions still owed Paramount Pictures three films and Douglas hinted that at least one of the three films may go towards it. Douglas also announced that, contrary to the past when Lewis would function in a production capacity on all Bryna Productions pictures, each future project would involve the casting of a producer, much in the same manner as choosing a director, screenwriter or actor.

In February 1967, Douglas traveled to Mexico in an attempt to finalize the production of Montezuma but was unsuccessful. In early May 1967, Bryna Productions and Martin Ritt Productions secured a $3,500,000 financing and distribution deal for The Brotherhood with Paramount Pictures. The picture started filming immediately following Douglas' commitment with A Lovely Way to Die, on location in Sicily on September 14, 1967, followed by New York City locations in October 1967. Typical of Ritt-produced films, the producer formed a single-purpose film production subsidiary named after the film, The Brotherhood Company, to act as copyright holder.

In the summer of 1967, Universal Pictures re-released Spartacus, accompanied by a massive promotional campaign. Unbeknownst to Douglas or past Bryna Productions executives who worked on the film, Universal Pictures cut 23 minutes from the picture for its re-release, a move which Douglas expressed unfavorably of in interviews. Douglas was so displeased with Universal Pictures' decision to cut the film without his knowledge, learning of it only through friends and reading a Variety article, that he refused to the see the edited cut. Douglas explained that had he been consulted, certain logical scenes and sequences would have been removed, rather than chopping bits and pieces at random and shortening scenes.

In March 1968, Bryna Productions acquired the filming rights to Ron Cowen's drama play Summertree and hired the author to adapt it into a screenplay. At the same time, Bryna Productions became affiliated with The Bronc Rider, which screenwriters Ronald M. Cohen and Dennis R. Shryack had adapted from William Crawford's novel of the same name, and were producing through their own film production company, Ronden Productions. Douglas agreed to star in and co-produce the film, which then secured financing and distribution through Paramount Pictures. The project, however, fell out of favor when Cohen and Shryack began putting their attention towards The Good Guys and the Bad Guys, which they had also written and were producing, with Robert Mitchum starring.

In mid-June 1968, Bryna Productions announced that it was planning an animated television film based on Jonathan Swift's classic novel Gulliver's Travels. The hour-long film was to be a co-production with animation studio Filmation and Douglas would narrate the picture. The film would also have original songs and be broadcast on television annually. In early July 1968, Norman Kurland was appointed Executive Assistant of Bryna Productions, with the job of developing new film projects for the company. Later that month, Bryna Productions secured a financing and distribution deal for Summertree with Columbia Pictures, and scheduled to film the story in early 1969. In mid-December 1968, Douglas signed a starring and co-production, financing and distribution deal for One Flew Over the Cuckoo's Nest between Bryna Productions and film producer Joseph E. Levine's Avco-Embassy Pictures, also set to shoot in 1969.

The Brotherhood opened in December 1968 and was generally well-received during previews. Carlino was nominated for a Writers Guild of America Award for Best Written American Original Screenplay. Douglas delayed the filming of Bryna Productions projects due to the immediate filming schedule on his next two starring pictures: Elia Kazan's The Arrangement and Joseph L. Mankiewicz's There Was a Crooked Man..., which were filmed between October 1968 and July 1969. In May 1969, Bryna Productions acquired the filming rights to Pierre Boulle's novel The Photographer, a thriller about a photographer that becomes involved with a plot to assassinate the president, which had been translated by Xan Fielding the year prior and published for the English market. That year, Bryna Productions also acquired the filming rights to Jules Verne's novel The Lighthouse at the End of the World, a survivalist adventure story that takes place on an isolated island. The project was assigned to screenwriter Tom Rowe, with plans for filming on location in Spain in 1970 with Douglas in the lead.

In 1969, Douglas began donating Bryna Productions' archival paperwork, as well as his personal film-related memorabilia, to the Wisconsin Historical Society's Wisconsin Center for Film and Theater Research, located on the campus of the University of Wisconsin–Madison in Madison, Wisconsin. The donations continued yearly, until 1981, and included such material as working and final scripts, casting notes, actor, crew and studio contracts, salaries, correspondence, advertisements and financial records.

=== Merger into The Bryna Company (1970–1971) ===
Over the years, Bryna Productions had occasionally been referred to by the press as "the Bryna company", but in January 1970, it started to regularly appear under the name The Bryna Company, with an official announcement rolling out to the press in late May 1970. Douglas opted to update the company's name when he envisioned welcoming his family into the corporate structure and made his wife Anne Douglas Vice-President and Treasurer of The Bryna Company and Joan Eisleben Secretary of The Bryna Company.

By this time, 26 year old Michael Douglas had worked on Joel Productions' Lonely Are the Brave, appeared in some uncredited walk-on parts in Eric Productions' stage play One Flew Over the Cuckoo's Nest, and worked behind the scenes on non-produced Kirk Douglas starrers like Cast a Giant Shadow and The Heroes of Telemark. Michael, who was set to star in Summertree, and had already formed his own independent film production company on November 24, 1969, Bigstick Productions, Limited. 23 year old Joel Douglas had not participated in his father's film career, but would later take part in several projects as production manager and producer. 15 year old Peter Douglas had already made cameo appearances in Brynaprod's The Vikings and Bryna Productions' Strangers When We Meet, and would go on to head The Bryna Company in the 1980s. 12 year old Eric Douglas had also made a cameo appearance in Strangers When We Meet, and would appear in Bryna Productions' upcoming film A Gunfight, but ultimately took little interest in the family's film production company. Buydens had done several jobs for the company, including heading the casting department, publicity and editing.

Though the name The Bryna Company was used for many months prior, it was only officially registered on October 29, 1970, while Kirk Douglas was in Spain filming The Light at the Edge of the World. The new company was formed by merging Bryna Productions and Joel Productions together into a single entity, by way of renaming Joel Productions to The Bryna Company, and then merging Bryna Productions into The Bryna Company. As such, the Douglases and the press continued to use and refer to the companies alternatively as Bryna Productions, Joel Productions and The Bryna Company for most of 1970 and into 1971 as pre-merger films were released.

In January 1970, Bryna Productions announced that it had three active productions which would be filmed before the end of the year: Summertree, The Light at the Edge of the World and A Gunfight. Summertree was set to start filming on March 16, 1970, on location in California, co-starring Michael Douglas, Brenda Vaccaro and Jack Warden, and with Anthony Newly directing; The Light at the Edge of the World was set to start filming on location in Spain in March 1970, co-starring Kirk Douglas, James Mason, Virna Lisi and Alan Bates, and with director Kevin Billington; while A Gunfight, a western in which Kirk Douglas agreed to co-produce and co-star with country singer Johnny Cash for producers Harold Jack Bloom and Ronald Lubin, would be filmed with director Lamont Johnson on location in Spain in June 1970, immediately following the wrap-up of The Light at the Edge of the World. A Gunfight was to be a co-production of Bryna Productions (which Douglas ultimately filed through Joel Productions), Blooms' Thoroughbred Productions and Lubin's Harvest Productions.

Summertree began filming as scheduled, using new Synctrol wireless cameras, on location in Pasadena, California. When the film wrapped up ahead of schedule, Newly was asked to direct three more films for Bryna Productions. The Light at the Edge of the World and A Gunfight were, however, both delayed due to financing and the filming order was switched; neither film had yet secured a distribution deal. A Gunfight was originally to be filmed entirely in Spain, but when the New Mexico-based Jicarilla Apache Indian tribe put up $2,000,000 to finance the picture, superseding the $175,000 investment the film had garnered from European investors, and outbidding Metro-Goldwyn-Mayer, United Artists and Harry Saltzman's Lowndes Productions, the location was moved to Mexico. The Mexican Film Bureau quickly objected to shooting in their country due to the film's duel scene, which, they felt, presented a false image of Mexico in the 1800s, a time when duels were outlawed. The local was then changed from Mexico to a Texas border town. The Jicarilla Apache then imposed that the film be shot entirely in New Mexico and a full western town and sets were built outside of Santa Fe, where filming began in May 1970. Through further negotiations, the financier eventually allowed the production company to film for a week at the Ocaña bullfighting ring in Spain. The picture was still filming when Paramount Pictures secured the film's distribution for the United States and Canada in mid-July 1970.

The $4,000,000 The Light at the Edge of the World went through several investors and co-producing companies before securing a Spanish financier and the picture finally made it into production. Bryna Productions and Joel Productions were each listed by the press during the making of the film, although Brynaprod, which had been formed to produce films outside the United States, was never attached. In early February 1970, Alexander Salkind signed on as co-producer through his Swiss independent film production company, Vulcano Film Handels. Salkind and his son Ilya Salkind would ultimately co-produce The Light at the Edge of the World through two of their many imprints and subsidiaries; first through Spanish company Barcarola, then through Leicthenstein company Triumfilm Anstalt. Salkind also recycled several of the originally-cast actors for his other film productions, like James Mason in Kill! and Virna Lisi in Bluebeard, when Yul Brynner and Samantha Eggar were re-cast as co-stars. In late May 1970, Angelo Rizzoli's Italian independent film production company, Rizzoli Films, became attached to the project and in September 1970, Bryna Productions was negotiating a European distribution deal with Metro-Goldwyn-Mayer. Alfredo Matas' Spanish company Jet Films also participated on the project.

In late October 1970, Bryna Productions secured an American distribution deal for The Light at the Edge of the World with National General Pictures and filming began, using Panavision cameras and Eastmancolor film, on location in Spain. The locals extended through Colmenar Viejo in Madrid, Cap de Creus in Cadaqués, Girona, Catalonia, La Manga del Mar Menor in Murcia, Jávea in Alicante, Valencia and at the Club Meditérranée. In mid-December 1970, Joel Productions bought out Wasserman's remaining interests in his screenplay of One Flew Over the Cuckoo's Nest, hoping to film it in the coming year with further development; Wasserman retained the rights to the play and any potential television version.

By February 1971, Bryna Productions had negotiated a co-producing and co-starring deal for Douglas to appear in a Euro-spy comedy film adaptation of George Marton and Tibor Meray's novel Catch Me a Spy. The screenplay was written by Ian La Frenais and Dick Clement and featured French actress Marlene Jobert and British actors Trevor Howard and Tom Courtenay. The film's title was first changed to Fabienne, then to Keep Your Fingers Crossed, and finally To Catch a Spy, and was co-produced by Nat Wachsberger's two film production companies, England-based Ludgate Films and France-based Capitole Films, as well as Pierre Braunberger's French film production company Les Films de la Pléiade. To Cath a Spy began filming, using Panavision cameras and Technicolor film, on March 22, 1971, on location in London, England and Oban, Scotland with director Dick Clement. In May 1971, Rank Film Distributors picked up the option to distribute To Catch a Spy in the United Kingdom, while Films Around the World would do the same for the American market. Once filming was completed on To Catch a Spy, Douglas and Wachsberger made plans to co-produce at least two more films together, through The Bryna Company, Ludgate Films and Capitole Films; both were to be made in Europe.

Bryna Productions had planned to produce One Flew Over the Cuckoo's Nest after Douglas returned to the United States in May 1971, which was to be shot entirely in Hollywood before the end of the year. Douglas was debating the idea of starring in the film and strongly considered directing it instead, looking to cast Lee Grant or Colleen Dewhurst in the role of Nurse Mildred Ratched. The film was delayed yet again and by October 1971, Kirk had passed the project on to his son Michael, who, in turn, dedicated several more years developing the film through The Bryna Company.

Bryna Productions had a record-setting four pictures released within a six-month period in mid-1971, and with the added re-release promotion of Walt Disney Productions' 20,000 Leagues Under the Sea, brought Douglas' name up to five films on the screen. A Gunfight, which featured Eric Douglas, had its world premiere on May 27, 1971, at Leows Theater in Albuquerque, New Mexico, while Summertree opened later that month. The Light at the Edge of the World held its world premiere on June 16, 1971, at six different theaters in the Washington D.C.-Baltimore, Maryland area. The film earned Fernando Rey a Fotogramas de Plata nomination for Best Spanish Movie Performer. To Catch a Spy opened in London in October 1971.

=== Two-picture deal with Paramount Pictures (1972–1975) ===
By 1972, The Bryna Company had set up its office at 141 El Camino Drive in Beverly Hills, California; formerly the headquarters of Four Star Productions and the Producers Guild of America. Douglas had anticipated filming four The Bryna Company projects in the United States between mid-1971 and through 1972, but was unable to secure American financing for the projects. Instead, he spent fourteen months shooting in Europe and the United Kingdom. In March 1972, The Bryna Company announced that Douglas would make his directorial debut with the $1,250,000 adventure film Scalawag, due to be filmed on location in Yugoslavia during the summer of 1972. Douglas planned to make the film as a family unit, securing his wife Anne Douglas as producer, his son Peter Douglas as still photographer, his son Eric Douglas as producer's assistant and their Labrador Retriever, Shaft Douglas, cast as Beau in the picture; Kirk Douglas himself acted, directed, co-produced and co-wrote the picture. Michael Douglas, who was working on One Flew Over the Cuckoo's Nest, had hoped to join the family on location but remained in California after being cast as co-star of American Broadcasting Company's new crime television series The Streets of San Francisco, which began shooting in late March 1972 and went on through most of the year.

Filming on Scalawag started on June 19, 1972 in Starigrad-Paklenica, Yugoslavia (modern-day Croatia), a small town located between the Adriatic coast and the Velebit mountains. Within weeks of when The Bryna Company cast and crew arrived, the area was inundated by tourists who wanted to be near Hollywood stars. Scalawag was the first film produced after the official renaming of The Bryna Company, and was made in cooperation with Yugoslavia's Inex Film and Italy's Oceania Produzioni Internazionali Cinematografiche film production companies. The film starred Kirk Douglas, Mark Lester, Lesley-Anne Down, Neville Brand and Danny DeVito, one of Michael Douglas' old friends. The film also featured noted comic actor Mel Blanc, who voiced the drunken parrot. Blanc would shortly after hire Joel Douglas as an executive for his media company, Blanc Communications Corporation, developing and producing commercials. Joel Douglas would later head The Douglas Company, another Kirk Douglas subsidiary

Immediately after filming wrapped on Scalawag, the Douglas family travelled to London, England for The Bryna Company's co-production of Dr. Jekyll and Mr. Hyde. The musical adaptation of Robert Louis Stevenson's novel had been announced in late April 1972, when producers Douglas, Burt Rosen and David Winters hired Lionel Bart to compose new numbers for the production. The picture was filmed at Shepperton Studios in London with Joel Douglas as production coordinator, and featured Kirk Douglas, Michael Redgrave, Susan Hampshire, Susan George, Donald Pleasence and Stanley Holloway.

In January 1973, Michael Douglas announced that One Flew Over the Cuckoo's Nest would be financed by Fantasy Films in a co-production deal with The Bryna Company. Kirk Douglas was to act as executive producer, while Michael Douglas and Fantasy Films' Saul Zaentz would act as producers. Kirk Douglas was hoping to play one of the featured roles in the film, while Michael Douglas scoured to find a lead. Dr. Jekyll and Mr. Hyde premiered on National Broadcasting Company on March 7, 1973, sponsored by Timex, and was scheduled to be released theatrically in Europe and the United Kingdom afterwards. The television film was a success and it was nominated for three Primetime Emmy Awards: Irwin Kostal was nominated for Outstanding Achievement in Music Direction of a Variety, Musical or Dramatic Program, Emma Porteous was nominated for Outstanding Achievement in Costume Design and Neville Smallwood was nominated for Outstanding Achievement in Makeup.

In late March 1973, Michael Douglas traveled to Olympia, Washington to scout locations for One Flew Over the Cuckoo's Nest, aiming for the picture to be filmed at the Northern State Hospital in Sedro-Woolley, Washington. In May 1973, Kirk Douglas and Frank Yablans inked a two-picture contract between The Bryna Company and Paramount Pictures. The deal called for the worldwide distribution of Scalawag as well as a promissory financing of $2,000,000 and the worldwide distribution of The Bryna Company's next motion picture, Posse. The financing of the secondary film by Paramount Pictures was conditional to The Bryna Company raising half of the budget on their own; Paramount Pictures was only guaranteeing their $1,000,000 investment if The Bryna Company could also put up $1,000,000. Posse, a psychological western, was to be another The Bryna Company family-made picture with Kirk Douglas directing, Anne Douglas producing, Joel Douglas assistant producer and Peter Douglas post-production supervisor. The screenplay was written by Christopher Knopf and William Roberts from Larry Cohen's short story The Train. When announced, the film was to start shooting in January 1974 in the United States with Kirk Douglas and Bruce Dern co-starring.

In early June 1973, Michael Douglas announced that The Bryna Company would be filming its $2,000,000 film One Flew Over the Cuckoo's Nest on location at Oregon State Hospital in Salem, Oregon during the late summer and early fall of 1973. Ken Kesey was hired to re-write the screenplay from his own novel, while Hal Ashby was secured to direct the film; it was Ashby's idea to cast Jack Nicholson in the lead, after working with the actor on The Last Detail, though the producers were also considering Stacy Keach, James Caan and Bruce Dern for the part. By September 1973, screenplay disputes and the author's refusal to submit his final script and sign the contract forced the filming to be pushed back to January 1974; screenwriter Lawrence Hauben was hired to rewrite the script and Miloš Forman came on as director. Scalawag premiered on October 16, 1973, in six key cities: Chicago, Illinois; Louisville, Kentucky; Albany, New York; Worcester, Massachusetts; Waterloo, Iowa; and Miami, Florida.

In March 1974, Peter Douglas formed The Bryna Company subsidiary Bryna International, a photographic service company. The Bryna Company's two 1974 productions, One Flew Over the Cuckoo's Nest and Posse, were both pushed back from their planned early 1974 filming dates. Michael Douglas' production of One Flew Over the Cuckoo's Nest was first pushed back to mid-March 1974, then to May 1974, and then again to September 1974. The reason was stated to be due to scheduling conflicts. By September 1974, the film had again been pushed back to January 1975. In July 1974, Phil Feldman was appointed executive producer of Posse and Howie Pine was hired as production manager for the shooting. Posse was filmed between September 23 and November 9, 1974, using Panavision cameras with Technicolor film, on location at Old Tucson Studios, as well as in Florence and Sabino Canyon, Arizona. The film also featured Bo Hopkins, James Stacy and Luke Askew.

One Flew Over the Cuckoo's Nest was finally filmed from January to March 1975 at Oregon State Hospital, with Joel Douglas serving as unit production manager. While the film was still shooting, Michael Douglas secured a one-picture distribution deal with United Artists. Posse opened to theaters in mid-May 1975, accompanied by Kirk Douglas doing a promotional tour to publicize the film. The picture's opening credit sequence announced that the film was a The Bryna Company production, but its copyrights were filled through Zeeuwse Maatschappij Naamloze Vennootschap, one of Paramount Pictures' many Curaçao-based subsidiaries under executive production manager Lindsley Parsons Jr. Kirk Douglas was nominated for a Golden Berlin Bear award at Berlin International Film Festival for his performance in Posse.

In mid-September 1975, Paramount Pictures re-released Scalawag under the title Jamie's Treasure Hunt. The film was screened in theaters as part of weekend matinee events for families and children, and the studio's new promotional campaign shifted the focus of the picture from Douglas's Peg Leg character to Mark Lester's Jamie character. In mid-October 1975, The Bryna Company announced that it would make a two-hour television special depicting the life and career of actor John Barrymore. Barrymore was to be financed and presented by National Broadcasting Company and Sidney Michaels was hired to write the teleplay. Kirk Douglas planned to play the lead and it was to be Peter Douglas' inaugural project as a producer. Filming was scheduled to start in March 1976 and was to be followed by five other video projects later that year, as part of the company's new television division.

One Flew Over the Cuckoo's Nest premiered on November 19, 1975, at the Regent Theatre in Westwood, Los Angeles, California and the next day headlined the Chicago International Film Festival, where it was nominated for a Gold Hugo Award for Best Feature. Once released, neither the film's credits nor its publicity featured any mention of The Bryna Company, nor of Bigstick Productions, though the film had been developed and co-produced by both entities (in partnership with Fantasy Films). Michael Douglas had been striving to detach himself from the "Kirk Douglas' son" tag which had been affixed to him in the 1960s, and wanted to establish his own identity. He had achieved considerable success with The Streets of San Francisco, and was planning to continue producing films outside of The Bryna Company organization. Afraid of nepotism, and wanting to establish himself as a producer outside of his father's company, the film's copyrights were instead filed through Curaçao-based imprint Naamloze Vennootschap Zwaluw, a corporation registered by Michael Douglas on December 6, 1974.

One Flew Over the Cuckoo's Nest was a huge critical and box office success, earning a slew of awards and nominations across the globe. The film won an Academy Award for Best Picture, Jack Nicholson won an Academy Award for Best Actor in a Leading Role, Louise Fletcher won an Academy Award for Best Actress in a Leading Role, Milos Forman won an Academy Award for Best Director, Lawrence Hauben and Bo Goldman won Academy Awards for Best Writing, Screenplay Adapted From Other Material, Brad Dourif was nominated for an Academy Award for Best Actor in a Supporting Role, Haskell Wexler and Bill Butler were nominated for Academy Awards for Best Cinematography, Richard Chew, Lynzee Klingman and Sheldon Kahn were nominated for Academy Awards for Best Editing, and Jack Nitzsche was nominated for an Academy Award for Best Music, Original Dramatic Score. The film won a Golden Globe Award for Best Motion Picture - Drama, Jack Nicholson won a Golden Globe Award for Best Actor in a Motion Picture - Drama, Louise Fletcher won a Golden Globe Award for Best Actress in a Motion Picture - Drama, Brad Dourif won a Golden Globe Award for Best Acting Debut in a Motion Picture - Male, Milos Forman won a Golden Globe Award for Best Director - Motion Picture and Lawrence Hauben and Bo Goldman won Golden Globe Awards for Best Screenplay - Motion Picture. The film won a BAFTA Award for Best Film, Jack Nicholson won a BAFTA Award for Best Actor, Louise Fletcher won a BAFTA Award for Best Actress, Brad Dourif won a BAFTA Award for Best Supporting Actor, Milos Forman won a BAFTA Award for Best Direction, Richard Chew, Lynzee Klingman and Sheldon Kahn won BAFTA Awards for Best Film Editing, Haskell Wexler, Bill Butler and William A. Fraker were nominated for BAFTA Awards for Best Cinematography, Lawrence Hauben and Bo Goldman were nominated for BAFTA Awards for Best Screenplay, Mary McGlone, Robert R. Rutledge, Veronica Selver, Larry Jost and Mark Berger were nominated for BAFTA Awards for Best Sound Track and Jack Nitzsche was nominated for BAFTA's Anthony Asquith Award for Film Music. Jack Nitzsche was nominated for a Grammy Award for Best Album of Original Score Written for a Motion Picture or Television Special.

Milos Forman won a Directors Guild of America Award for Outstanding Directorial Achievement in Motion Pictures, while assistant directors Irby Smith and William Saint John and unit production manager Joel Douglas were given plaques by the same organization. Lawrence Hauben and Bo Goldman won Writers Guild of America Awards for Best Drama Adapted from Another Medium. The film won a Los Angeles Film Critics Association Award for Best Picture, a People's Choice Award for Favorite Motion Picture, and a National Board of Review: Top Ten Films. Jack Nicholson won a National Board of Review Award for Best Actor, a National Society of Film Critics Award for Best Actor and a New York Film Critics Circle Award for Best Actor, while Louise Fletcher was nominated for a New York Film Critics Circle Award for Best Supporting Actress; Milos Forman won a Kansas City Film Critics Circle Award for Best Director; Richard Chew, Sheldon Kahn and Lynzee Klingman were nominated for Eddie Awards for Best Edited Feature Film.

The film won a Bodil Award for Best Non-European Film and a Golden Screen Award, and was nominated for a César Award for Best Foreign Film and a Turkish Film Critics Association Award for Best Foreign Film. Milos Forman won a Reader's Choice Award for Best Foreign Language Film Director, a David di Donatello Award for Best Foreign Director, and a Silver Ribbon Award for Best Foreign Director. Jack Nicholson won a Sant Jordi Award for Best Foreign Actor and David di Donatello Award for Best Foreign Actor. In 1993, the United States National Film Preservation Board deemed One Flew Over the Cuckoo's Nest "culturally, historically, or aesthetically significant" and selected it for preservation in the Library of Congress' National Film Registry.

=== Michael and Peter Douglas take over (1976–1982) ===
On January 9, 1976, Brynaprod was surrendered and on June 24, 1976, Michael Productions was surrendered; their remaining interests were merged into The Bryna Company. In late July 1976, The Bryna Company announced that it would make Ray Bradbury's Something Wicked This Way Comes, a fantasy story about two boys in a small town who encounter strange happenings at a travelling carnival. The project was headed by Peter Douglas, who hired Bradbury to adapt his novel into a screenplay and secured a $6,000,000 financing and distribution deal with Paramount Pictures. Something Wicked This Way Comes was to be co-produced by Hank Moonjean and filming was to start on October 1, 1976, on location in Northern California and the Midwest under the direction of Jack Clayton. Kirk Douglas was hoping to play the role of Charles Halloway, the father in the story. The project, like One Flew Over the Cuckoo's Nest, would stall for several years before being filmed. Filming was pushed back to January 1, 1977, then to March 1, 1977.

In mid-September 1976, Kirk Douglas revealed plans to return to the stage and star in Howard Fast's Thomas Paine biographical one-man show Citizen Tom Paine. The play was to be a co-production between The Bryna Company and producers Don Gregory and Mike Merrick's Dome Productions. Charles Nelson Reilly was originally hired to direct the show but he was replaced by Arvin Brown. The play was to begin rehearsals on December 6, 1976, and was booked to open on January 11, 1977, at The Playhouse in Wilmington, Delaware, followed by engagements in Memphis, Tennessee, Cleveland, Ohio, Boston, Massachusetts, Philadelphia, Pennsylvania, New York City and Los Angeles. The production was delayed when Kirk Douglas suffered throat problems in early December 1976; personal differences between the producers later lead to the cancellation of the play.

In early November 1976, The Bryna Company announced that Peter Douglas would produce The Yellow Jersey, a film about the French Tour de France bicycle race. Peter Douglas offered the lead parts to Bruce Dern and Charlotte Rampling. A month later, Kirk Douglas held a press conference to announce that he would retire from producing and directing in order to focus solely on acting. Kirk Douglas was to remain President of The Bryna Company, but all of the day-to-day activities, including the development and production of new pictures, was passed on to his sons Michael and Peter, who would co-head the company. In mid-January 1977, Paramount Pictures announced that it had dropped its plans to finance and distribute Something Wicked This Way Comes, after having pushed back the filming date twice. It was later revealed that the project had been collateral damage from Paramount Pictures President David V. Picker's feud with Board Chairman Barry Diller.

Michael Douglas began working on the production of The China Syndrome in 1977, a thriller about the threat of a nuclear plant meltdown, while Peter Douglas began working on the production of The Final Countdown, a science fiction-war picture about a nuclear ship that enters a time-warp and is thrown back to World War II in 1941. The China Syndrome was to co-star Michael Douglas, Jane Fonda and Jack Lemmon, and was to be co-produced by Douglas in cooperation with Fonda's film production company, IPC Films. In June 1977, The Bryna Company announced that Something Wicked This Way Comes would be filmed at Bavaria Studios in Munich, Germany, as a co-production between Geria Film Productions and Bavaria Film. The $4,000,000-budgeted film was to start shooting in the fall of 1977 and distribution had already been secured with 20th Century-Fox Film for the United States and Canada and CS Filmverleih in Germany.

By 1978, Michael Douglas had departed from The Bryna Company and took with him The China Syndrome project to develop exclusively through his own imprint, Bigstick Productions. Michael opted to leave his father's company in order to further his independence and individual identity; nevertheless, like his father, he would go on to head a series of successful independent film production companies, including El Corazon Producciones (1983–1986), The Stone Group (1984–1986), Mercury/Douglas Films (1986–1988), Stonebridge Entertainment (1988–1994), Douglas/Reuther Productions (1994–1997), and Further Films (1997–present); as well as the magazine L.A. Style, the music publishing company, Third Stone Music (1989–1994), and the record label Third Stone Records (1990–1994). On August 8, 1978, Peter Douglas formed his own independent film production company, Vincent Pictures, hoping to further his independence and individual identity. On December 14, 1978, Kirk Douglas formed The Bryna Company subsidiary Cameron Productions, Incorporated, named after his first grandson, Cameron Douglas; the company was registered the day after his birth.

The Final Countdown went through a team of writers, including Thomas Hunter, Peter Powell, David Ambrose and Gerry Davis and was turned down by every major Hollywood film studio. In early May 1979, The Bryna Company announced that it had secured a $7,000,000 financing deal for The Final Countdown with Arthur Guinness Son and Company Limited's film-financing subsidiary, Film Finance Group. The picture was to be co-produced by Film Finance Group's president, Richard Rogers St. Johns, through its film production division, Aspen Productions. Filming began, using Panavision cameras and Technicolor film with Dolby Stereophonic sound, on May 23, 1979, on location aboard the U.S.S. Nimitz in Norfolk, Virginia, followed by Miami, Florida and Pearl Harbor, Hawaii. The film co-starred Kirk Douglas, Martin Sheen, James Farentino and Katharine Ross and was directed by Don Taylor.

Peter Douglas originally objected to the casting of his father in The Final Countdown, his first picture as a producer, fearing that it would impart the idea of nepotism. It was only once he felt that Kirk Douglas was truly right for the part that he consented to working with his father. The Final Countdown ultimately cost $12,000,000 to produce and United Artists agreed to distribute it after seeing only several minutes of early footage. The film's copyrights were filed through Polyc International Besloten Vennootschap a Dutch subsidiary of Film Finance Group. The Final Countdown was released to theaters on August 1, 1980, and was a huge financial success, earning more than $3,000,000 during its opening weekend. The film won a Golden Screen Award and was nominated for a Saturn Award for Best Science Fiction Film; Kirk Douglas was also nominated for a Saturn Award for Best Actor. On December 13, 1980, Kirk Douglas formed The Bryna Company subsidiary Bryna Industries, Incorporated, a holding corporation based in Texas, naming Anne Douglas as Secretary.

In July 1981, The Bryna Company announced that it had secured a $13,500,000 financing, co-producing and distribution deal for Something Wicked This Way Comes with Walt Disney Productions and Buena Vista. The Disney company had originally approach Peter Douglas with offers to buy out the property but The Bryna Company was so interested in producing the picture that it held out until a co-production deal could be set. Other financing and co-producing deals with Avco-Embassy Pictures and director John Carpenter were avoided for similar reasons. Filming on Something Wicked This Way Comes began on September 28, 1981, using Panavision's Panaflex cameras and Technicolor film with Dolby Stereophonic sound, on location at Walt Disney Productions' Golden Oak Ranch in Santa Clarita, California and Walt Disney Studios in Burbank, California; a second unit also filmed landscapes in Vermont. The film starred Jason Robards, Diane Ladd and Jonathan Pryce and was directed by Jack Clayton.

=== Anne Douglas presidency (1982–1985) ===
In 1982, Peter Douglas took a hiatus from working at The Bryna Company to properly launch his independent film production company, Vincent Pictures, securing a financing and distribution deal for the comedy film Fletch with Universal Pictures. Part of the lengthy development of the Vincent Pictures-Universal Pictures deal included securing the principal cast and crew to produce any potential sequels, which later developed as Fletch Lives.

In early August 1982, Kirk Douglas announced that he had appointed his wife Anne Douglas as President of The Bryna Company. Buydens revealed that The Bryna Company would increase its film production schedule and had acquired the filming rights to two new novels: Frank Rooney's Shadow of God, a religious thriller about a nun being stalked by a fanatic priest; and Mary Higgins Clark's A Cry in the Night, a suspense mystery about a single mother who falls in love and marries an unstable man. In November 1982, Kirk Douglas expressed a desire to produce a motion picture that included himself and his four sons; Kirk, Michael and Eric were to act in the picture, with Joel as production manager and Peter producing. 20 years later, Michael Douglas wound up producing It Runs in the Family through his company Further Films; the movie co-starred Kirk, Michael, Cameron (Michael's son) and Diana Douglas (Kirk's first wife and Michael's mother), and was co-produced by Michael and Joel.

Something Wicked This Way Comes opened on April 29, 1983. While it was generally well received by critics, the film failed to recoup its increased $20,000,000 budget at the box office; it has since become a cult film. The Academy of Science Fiction, Fantasy & Horror Films awarded the film a Saturn Award for Best Fantasy Film and Bradbury a Saturn Award for Best Writing. Jonathan Pryce was nominated for a Saturn Award for Best Supporting Actor, James Horner was nominated for a Saturn Award for Best Music, Ruth Myers was nominated for a Saturn Award for Best Costumes, Lee Dyer was nominated for a Saturn Award for Best Special Effects, and Gary Liddiard and James R. Scribner were nominated for Saturn Awards for Best Make-Up. Jack Clayton was nominated for the Grand Prize at the Avoriaz Fantastic Film Festival and Clayton and Bradbury were together nominated for a Hugo Award for Best Dramatic Presentation.

In mid-June 1983, The Bryna Company announced that it would be filming Draw!, a comedy western about an aging outlaw and a drunken ex-sheriff, co-starring Kirk Douglas, James Coburn and Alexandra Bastedo. At the Banff Television Festival, held at the Banff Centre for Arts and Creativity on August 15, 1983, Canadian producer Harold Greenberg announced that he would be co-producing the $4,200,000 picture through his film production company Astral Film Productions. The Stanley Mann script had been in development for seven years and was co-financed by HBO Premiere Films and the Alberta Motion Picture Development Corporation. Filming began on August 16, 1983, with six weeks on location at Fort Edmonton, Alberta, followed by another week in Drumheller, Alberta, with director Steven Hilliard Stern. Upon returning to the United States in late 1983, Kirk Douglas announced that The Bryna Company would next produce Stanley West's novel Amos, a suspense-drama about a former baseball coach who uncovers a conspiracy in the nursing home in which he resides, as a television film for Columbia Broadcasting System.

The producers originally announced Draw! as a theatrical film, with plans for Home Box Office to host the United States television premiere afterwards. Draw! had its world premiere at the Banff Television Festival in Alberta, Canada on May 20, 1984, followed by its United States premiere on July 15, 1984, broadcast on Home Box Office. The film earned several nominations at the Canadian Genie Awards ceremony in 1985: Linda Sorensen won a Genie Award for Best Performance by an Actress in a Supporting Role, Laszlo George was nominated for Genie Award for Best Achievement in Cinematography, Bill Brodie was nominated for a Genie Award for Best Achievement in Art Direction, Jim Hopkins was nominated for a Genie Award for Best Achievement in Sound Editing, and Joe Grimaldi, Dino Pigat, Richard Lightstone and Austin Grimaldi were nominated for Genie Awards for Best Achievement in Overall Sound. Ron Wisman was also nominated for a CableACE Award for Film Editing.

Following the success of Michael Douglas and Joel Douglas' action-adventure film production Romancing the Stone in the spring of 1984, the Douglases attempted to find an action-packed violence film to co-star Kirk Douglas and Michael Douglas. The film was to be a co-production between Kirk Douglas, Michael Douglas and Joel Douglas, with plans for filming in 1985, but the right vehicle never came up. Meanwhile, Amos was to be co-produced by Kirk Douglas and Peter Douglas, starring Kirk Douglas, and with Eric Douglas portraying the character's younger self in flashback scenes (Kirk Douglas ended up portraying his own flashback sequences). The filming of Amos was delayed while Peter Douglas wrapped up Fletch.

In July 1984, The Bryna Company announced that it would remake Seven Days in May as a television film for Columbia Broadcasting System, with a slightly modernized plot involving the threat of nuclear warfare. The project remained in development for ten years until Peter Douglas managed to produce it through Vincent Pictures, in partnership with HBO Pictures, under the title The Enemy Within. In August 1984, The Bryna Company acquired the filming rights to Charles Dickinson's novel Waltz in Marathon, a drama about a loan shark from Marathon, Michigan whose life is altered when he is reunited with his ex-romantic partner and grown-up children. Kirk Douglas planned to play the lead in the film. Amos began filming in early December 1984, using Panavision cameras, on location in Ojay, California and at the Los Padres National Forest, with director Michael Tuchner. The film co-starred Kirk Douglas, Elizabeth Montgomery, Dorothy McGuire, Pat Morita and Ray Walston and was co-produced by Bill Finnegan and Sheldon Pinchuk.

=== Lawsuits and mergers (1985–1989) ===
In mid-June 1985, The Bryna Company was involved in a lawsuit filed by the federal government and the United States Navy, seeking $1,300,000 of unpaid military flying time during the filming of The Final Countdown. The suit claimed that The Bryna Company and Aspen Productions had only been charged for 32.5 hours of aircraft flying time, while the Navy had in fact provided 167 hours of flying time. The suit also revealed that Navy Commander Emory Worth Brown, Jr., a decorated Navy fighter pilot assigned to keep track of the flying hours during shooting, had accepted a bribe of $5,563.48 during the filming. Brown had since been convicted and dishonorably discharged from the Navy, but was named in the lawsuit for punitive damages. The scandal was also the subject of a CBS 60 Minutes episode, which had aired on March 18, 1984. More than a year after the suit was filled, on September 10, 1986, the Justice Department ruled that The Bryna Company would have to pay $400,000 to the Federal Government and United States Navy to cover unpaid costs.

Amos premiered on September 29, 1985, broadcast on Columbia Broadcasting System and was a success. The film was nominated for four Primetime Emmy Awards and three Golden Globe Awards. The film itself was nominated for a Golden Globe Award for Best Miniseries or Motion Picture Made for Television and a Primetime Emmy Award for Outstanding Drama/Comedy Special, Kirk Douglas was nominated for a Golden Globe Award for Best Performance by an Actor in a Miniseries or Motion Picture Made for Television and a Primetime Emmy Award for Outstanding Lead Actor in a Miniseries or a Special, Pat Morita was nominated for a Golden Globe Award for Best Performance by an Actor in a Supporting Role in a Series, Miniseries or Motion Picture Made for Television and a Primetime Emmy Award for Outstanding Supporting Actor in a Miniseries or a Special, and Dorothy McGuire was nominated for a Primetime Emmy Award for Outstanding Supporting Actress in a Miniseries or a Special.

While promoting Amos, The Bryna Company announced that it was in negotiations with Walt Disney Productions for a film teaming Kirk Douglas and Burt Lancaster. The pair had worked together a number of times over the years, including I Walk Alone, released theatrically in 1947; Gunfight at the O.K. Corral, released theatrically in 1956; the 30th Academy Awards ceremony in 1958 and the 31st Academy Awards ceremony in 1959, at which they performed comedic song and dance numbers before presenting awards; The Devil's Disciple, released theatrically in 1959; The List of Adrian Messenger, released theatrically in 1963 and in which they did not share any scenes together, but as Douglas was executive producer, they interacted; Seven Days in May, released theatrically in 1964; Victory at Entebbe, broadcast on television in 1976, and although they both appear in the film, the two actors filmed their separate scenes at different times and did not interact during the production; The Boys in Autumn, which was staged in early 1981; and the 57th Academy Awards ceremony in 1985, at which they appeared on stage together with Michael Douglas.

On December 23, 1985, the California-based The Bryna Company was merged into the Texas-based Bryna Industries; the Texas-based company was simultaneously renamed The Bryna Company. The Bryna Company would remain under Texas' jurisdiction for the next three years.

Filming of Tough Guys began in late February 1986, using Panavision's Panaflex cameras and DeLuxe film with Dolby Stereophonic sound, on location in Los Angeles, California, Portland, Oregon, and at Walt Disney Studios in Burbank, California, with director Jeff Kanew. The film was co-produced by Joe Wizan, Richard Hashimoto and Jana Sue Memel through The Bryna Company and Touchstone Pictures. In addition to co-stars Kirk Douglas and Burt Lancaster, the film also featured Adolph Cesar, Charles Durning, Alexis Smith, Dana Carvey and Darlanne Fluegel. On March 6, 1986, Cesar suffered a fatal heart attack on the set, before any of his scenes were shot; he was replaced by Eli Wallach.

Tough Guys had its premiere at ShowEast, a movie theater owners' convention held in Atlantic City, New Jersey, between September 9–11, 1986. It then had local premieres at the Miami Film Festival on September 22, 1986, and the Boston Film and Video Festival on September 24, 1986, before opening nationwide to theaters on October 3, 1986. Composer Burt Bacharach, lyricist Carole Bayer Sager and performer Kenny Rogers were nominated for a Golden Globe Award for Best Original Song - Motion Picture for the film's opening theme song "They Don't Make Them Like They Used to"; Rogers titled his 1986 album after the song. In late December 1986, Kirk Douglas announced that he wished to retire from producing films.

On May 19, 1987, Columbia Broadcasting System executives announced that their 1987–88 season programming would include Conquistador, an eight-hour mini-series about Hernán Cortés' 1519 conquest of Moctezuma II's Aztec Empire, currently in pre-production by Michael Douglas and Michael Phillips' Mercury/Douglas Films. In late August 1987, The Bryna Company announced that it was again developing its feature film Montezuma, based on Dalton Trumbo's completed screenplay from 1960. Neither the television series, nor the feature film, were ever produced. By 1987, Peter Douglas was exclusively working through his own company, Vincent Pictures, and hired Kirk Douglas to co-star with Jason Robards in a remake of Inherit the Wind.

In late August 1987, The Bryna Company filled a $17,800,000 breach of contract lawsuit against the Unisys Corporation and the Sperry Corporation, which had employed Kirk Douglas' services as corporate spokesman two years prior. The Sperry Corporation had secured the services of Kirk Douglas, through The Bryna Company, for a two-year exclusive contract, beginning on October 14, 1985; the contract had a renewable three-year extension option. The contract also stipulated that Kirk Douglas could only be let go of his position in the event of a merger in which the Sperry line of products would be discontinued. In promotion of the company, Kirk Douglas appeared in television commercials, researched the company's history, studied biographies of executives for personal appearances, attended executive meetings and employee conventions, and visited public exhibits such as Walt Disney World (to film commercials). He also produced and appeared in the short film Sperry Goes Hollywood, filmed during the making of Tough Guys and co-produced by The Bryna Company. The short film included behind the scenes footage of Tough Guys as well as film footage of Romancing the Stone, during which Douglas hinted that he and his son would appear in a biopic about Elmer Ambrose Sperry and his son Lawrence Sperry. On September 16, 1986, Burroughs Corporation acquired the Sperry Corporation and renamed the new entity the Unisys Corporation, but failed to discontinue the Sperry line of computer products. Nevertheless, The Bryna Company was informed via letter on October 23, 1986, that Kirk Douglas' services were terminated. The Bryna Company sought $5,900,000 for breach of contract, $5,900,000 for breach of an implied obligation of good faith, and $6,000,000 for lost profits.

In January 1988, Douglas announced that he was in the early stage of preparing a new boxing picture for he and Tony Danza to co-star. The premise would have Douglas in a similar role to his 1949 film Champion, but in an older character who finds Danza as a new contender. The picture was to be co-produced through The Bryna Company and Weintraub Entertainment Group, with Jerry Weintraub producing and directed by Jeff Kanew. Plans called for the shooting to take place in Atlantic City.

On August 23, 1988, Anne Douglas formed The Bryna Company subsidiary TBC Merger, Incorporated, a California-based corporation. On September 8, 1988, the Texas-based The Bryna Company was merged into the California-based TBC Merger; the California company was simultaneously renamed The Bryna Company, resuming the company's operations in California after three years.

From October 13–15, 1989, the American Cinematheque held a three-day celebratory festival to honor The Bryna Company and Kirk Douglas' executive producer accomplishments. The festival, which was named Kirk Douglas & The Bryna Co.: The Star as Producer, was held at the Directors Guild of America Theatre in Hollywood, where eight films were screened: The Indian Fighter, The Vikings, Paths of Glory, an uncut version of Spartacus, Lonely Are the Brave, Seven Days in May, Posse and Amos. The event was attended by Motion Picture Association of America President Jack Valenti, director John Frankenheimer, actor Bo Hopkins, actress Dorothy McGuire and Kirk Douglas himself, all of whom participated in question-and-answer sessions between screenings.

In late August 1999, Kirk Douglas announced plans to make a boxing film through The Bryna Company. Douglas wanted to play the role of a trainer and hoped to cast Don King as a promoter.

== Contracted actors ==
The following is a list of actors that were signed to long-term, multi-picture contracts with Bryna Productions.

- Kirk Douglas Bryna Productions and The Bryna Company was used as an intermediary to secure the services of Kirk Douglas as an actor; companies would employ Kirk Douglas through Bryna Productions, and later through The Bryna Company.
- Elsa Martinelli (1956–1958) signed to a two pictures a year for two years non-exclusive contract in February 1956, following her appearance in The Indian Fighter. She was loaned out from Bryna Productions to Universal-International Pictures in March 1956 for the film Four Girls in Town.
- Dean Stockwell (1956–1961) signed to a five-year contract in December 1956, before the start of filming The Careless Years.
- Natalie Trundy (1956–1961) signed to a two pictures a year for five years contract in December 1956, before the start of filming The Careless Years.
- Betty Hutton (1957) signed to a retroactive two-picture contract in early 1957 after the completion of Spring Reunion.
- Janet Leigh (1957) signed to an additional one-picture deal in 1957 during the filming of The Vikings.
- Nina Foch (1959–1960) signed to an additional one-picture deal in April 1959 during the filming of Spartacus.

== Film productions ==
=== Completed theatrical films ===
Premiere date	Film	Production company	Distribution Company	Awards
December 21, 1955	The Indian Fighter	Bryna Productions	United Artists	
December 1956	Spring Reunion	Bryna Productions	United Artists	
February 1957	Lizzie	Bryna Productions	Metro-Goldwyn-Mayer	
September 1957	The Careless Years	Bryna Productions / Michael Productions	United Artists	
October 1957	Ride Out for Revenge	Bryna Productions	United Artists	
October 25, 1957	Paths of Glory	Bryna Productions / Harris-Kubrick Pictures	United Artists	Grand Prix de l'UCC Cantaclaro Award for Best American Motion Picture Italian National Syndicate of Film Journalists Silver Ribbon for Best Foreign Director Jussi Award for Best Foreign Director National Film Preservation Board National Film Registry Nominated—BAFTA Award for Best Film from any Source Nominated—Golden Laurel Award for Top Male Supporting Performance Nominated—Writers Guild of America Award for Best Written American Drama
June 12, 1958	The Vikings	Brynaprod / Curtleigh Productions	United Artists	Golden Laurel Award for Top Action Drama San Sebastián International Film Festival Zulueta Prize Nominated—Directors Guild of America Award for Outstanding Directorial Achievement in Motion Pictures
July 1959	Last Train from Gun Hill	Bryna Productions / Wallis-Hazen Productions	Paramount Pictures	Nominated—Golden Laurel Award for Top Action Performance
August 20, 1959	The Devil's Disciple	Brynaprod / Hecht-Hill-Lancaster Films	United Artists	Nominated—BAFTA Award for Best British Actor
June 29, 1960	Strangers When We Meet	Bryna Productions / Quine Productions	Columbia Pictures	
October 6, 1960	Spartacus	Bryna Productions	Universal-International Pictures	Academy Award for Best Actor in a Supporting Role Academy Award for Best Cinematography, Color Academy Award for Best Art Direction-Set Decoration, Color Academy Award for Best Costume Design Golden Globe Award for Best Motion Picture – Drama Huabiao Film Award — Outstanding Translated Foreign Film International Film Music Critics Award for Best Archival Release of an Existing Score Motion Picture Sound Editors Golden Reel Award for Best Sound Editing - Feature Film National Film Preservation Board National Film Registry Nominated—Academy Award for Best Film Editing Nominated—Academy Award for Best Music, Scoring of a Dramatic or Comedy Picture Nominated—Golden Globe Award for Best Director Nominated—Golden Globe Award for Best Actor – Motion Picture Drama Nominated—Golden Globe Award for Best Supporting Actor Nominated—Golden Globe Award for Best Original Score Nominated—BAFTA Award for Best Film from any Source Nominated—Golden Laurel Award for Top Male Dramatic Performance Nominated—Golden Laurel Award for Top Male Supporting Performance Nominated—Writers Guild of America Award for Best Written American Drama
June 8, 1961	The Last Sunset	Brynaprod	Universal-International Pictures	Nominated—Golden Laurel Award for Top Action Performance
May 24, 1962	Lonely Are the Brave	Joel Productions	Universal-International Pictures	Motion Picture Sound Editors Golden Reel Award for Best Sound Editing - Feature Film Nominated—BAFTA Award for Best Foreign Actor Nominated—Golden Laurel Award for Top Action Performance
May 29, 1963	The List of Adrian Messenger	Joel Productions	Universal-International Pictures	Nominated—Edgar Allan Poe Award for Best Motion Picture
February 12, 1964	Seven Days in May	Joel Productions / John Frankenheimer Productions / Cayuga Productions / Seven Arts Productions	Paramount Pictures	Golden Globe Award for Best Supporting Actor Bodil Award for Best Non-European Film Boxoffice Blue Ribbon Award for Best Picture of the Month David di Donatello Award for Best Foreign Actor Nominated—Academy Award for Best Actor in a Supporting Role Nominated—Academy Award for Best Art Direction-Set Decoration, Black and White Nominated—Golden Globe Award for Best Director Nominated—Golden Globe Award for Best Actor – Motion Picture Drama Nominated—Golden Globe Award for Best Original Score Nominated—Golden Laurel Award for Top Drama Nominated—Golden Laurel Award for Top Male Dramatic Performance Nominated—Writers Guild of America Award for Best Written American Drama
May 16, 1966	Seconds	Douglas and Lewis Productions / Joel Productions / John Frankenheimer Productions / Gibraltar Productions	Paramount Pictures	National Film Preservation Board National Film Registry Nominated—Academy Award for Best Cinematography, Black and White Nominated—Bambi Award for Best Actor - International Nominated—Cannes Film Festival Palme d'Or
December 21, 1966	Grand Prix	Douglas and Lewis Productions / Joel Productions / John Frankenheimer Productions / Cherokee Productions	Metro-Goldwyn-Mayer	Academy Award for Best Sound Academy Award for Best Film Editing Academy Award for Best Effects, Sound Effects Nominated—Golden Globe Award for Most Promising Newcomer - Male Nominated—Golden Globe Award for Most Promising Newcomer - Female Nominated—American Cinema Editors Award for Best Edited Feature Film Nominated—Directors Guild of America Award for Outstanding Directorial Achievement in Motion Pictures
December 1968	The Brotherhood	Bryna Productions / Martin Ritt Productions / The Brotherhood Company	Paramount Pictures	Nominated—Writers Guild of America Award for Best Written American Original Screenplay
May 27, 1971	A Gunfight	The Bryna Company / Joel Productions / Harvest Productions / Thoroughbred Productions	Paramount Pictures	
May 1971	Summertree	The Bryna Company / Bryna Productions	Columbia Pictures	
June 16, 1971	The Light at the Edge of the World	The Bryna Company / Bryna Productions / Vulcano Film / Barcarola / Jet Films / Triumfilm / Rizzoli Film	National General Pictures / Metro-Goldwyn-Mayer	Nominated—Fotogramas de Plata for Best Spanish Movie Performer
October 1971	To Catch a Spy	The Bryna Company / Bryna Productions / Ludgate Films / Les Films de la Pléiade / Capitole Films	Films Around the World / Rank Film Distributors	
October 16, 1973	Scalawag	The Bryna Company / Inex Film / Oceania Produzioni Internazionali Cinematografiche	Paramount Pictures	
May 1975	Posse	The Bryna Company / Zeeuwse Maatschappij	Paramount Pictures	Nominated—Berlin International Film Festival Golden Berlin Bear
November 19, 1975	One Flew Over the Cuckoo's Nest	The Bryna Company / Bigstick Productions / Fantasy Films / Zwaluw	United Artists	Academy Award for Best Picture Academy Award for Best Actor in a Leading Role Academy Award for Best Actress in a Leading Role Academy Award for Best Director Academy Award for Best Writing, Screenplay Adapted From Other Material Golden Globe Award for Best Motion Picture - Drama Golden Globe Award for Best Actor in a Motion Picture - Drama Golden Globe Award for Best Actress in a Motion Picture - Drama Golden Globe Award for Best Acting Debut in a Motion Picture - Male Golden Globe Award for Best Director - Motion Picture Golden Globe Award for Best Screenplay - Motion Picture BAFTA Award for Best Film BAFTA Award for Best Actor BAFTA Award for Best Actress BAFTA Award for Best Supporting Actor BAFTA Award for Best Direction BAFTA Award for Best Film Editing Bodil Award for Best Non-European Film David di Donatello Award for Best Foreign Director David di Donatello Award for Best Foreign Actor Directors Guild of America Award for Outstanding Directorial Achievement in Motion Pictures Reader's Choice Award for Best Foreign Language Film Director Los Angeles Film Critics Association Award for Best Picture National Board of Review: Top Ten Films National Board of Review Award for Best Actor National Film Preservation Board National Film Registry National Society of Film Critics Award for Best Actor New York Film Critics Circle Award for Best Actor People's Choice Award for Favorite Motion Picture Sant Jordi Award for Best Foreign Actor Writers Guild of America Award for Best Drama Adapted from Another Medium Golden Screen Award Silver Ribbon Award for Best Foreign Director Kansas City Film Critics Circle Award for Best Director Online Film & Television Association Motion Picture Hall of Fame Nominated—Academy Award for Best Actor in a Supporting Role Nominated—Academy Award for Best Cinematography Nominated—Academy Award for Best Editing Nominated—Academy Award for Best Music, Original Dramatic Score Nominated—Anthony Asquith Award for Film Music Nominated—BAFTA Award for Best Cinematography Nominated—BAFTA Award for Best Screenplay Nominated—BAFTA Award for Best Sound Track Nominated—Eddie Award for Best Edited Feature Film Nominated—Gold Hugo Award for Best Feature Nominated—César Award for Best Foreign Film Nominated—Grammy Award for Best Album of Original Score Written for a Motion Picture or Television Special Nominated—New York Film Critics Circle Award for Best Supporting Actress Nominated—Turkish Film Critics Association Award for Best Foreign Film
August 1, 1980	The Final Countdown	The Bryna Company / Aspen Productions / Polyc International / Film Finance Group	United Artists	Golden Screen Award Nominated—Saturn Award for Best Science Fiction Film Nominated—Saturn Award for Best Actor
April 29, 1983	Something Wicked This Way Comes	The Bryna Company / Walt Disney Productions	Buena Vista	Saturn Award for Best Fantasy Film Saturn Award for Best Writing Nominated—Saturn Award for Best Supporting Actor Nominated—Saturn Award for Best Music Nominated—Saturn Award for Best Costumes Nominated—Saturn Award for Best Make-Up Nominated—Saturn Award for Best Special Effects Nominated—Avoriaz Fantastic Film Festival Grand Prize Nominated—Hugo Award for Best Dramatic Presentation
September 9, 1986	Tough Guys	The Bryna Company / Touchstone Pictures / Silver Screen Partners II	Buena Vista	Nominated—Golden Globe Award for Best Original Song - Motion Picture

=== Unrealized film projects ===
- The Shadow / Mr. Shadow (1949–1959)
- The Life of David Garrick / Garrick's Gayeties (1950)
- Nowhere to Go (1950)
- The Fear Makers (1951–1952)
- Strange Harvest (1952–1953)
- The Quality of Mercy (1954)
- Van Gogh (1954–1955)
- The Dangerous Game (1954)
- Freak Show (1955)
- The Runaway Heart (1955)
- Shadow of the Champ (1955–1956)
- The Syndicate / Britain's Two-Headed Spy / Two-Headed Spy (1954–1956)
- The Allison Brothers (1955–1956)
- King Kelly (1955–1957)
- A Most Contagious Game (1956–1959)
- A Very Special Baby (1956)
- The Silent Gun (1956–1959)
- Deliver Us From Evil (1956)
- Mavourneen (1956)
- The Beach House (1956)
- Elisha and the Long Knives (1956)
- Three Rings for Julie (1957)
- I Stole $16,000,000 / God Fearing Man (1957–1958)
- The Beach Boys (1958–1960)
- Michael Strogoff (1958–1959)
- Two For the Seesaw (1958–1960)
- Viva, Gringo! (1958–1959)
- The Chains of Fear (1958)
- The Adventures of Simon Bolivar / Simon Bolivar the Liberator (1958–1959)
- And the Rock Cried Out (1958–1959)
- The Indian Wars (1958–1959)
- The Sun at Midnight (1958–1959)
- Earthquake (1959)
- War Between the Gods / War of the Gods / War of Two Gods (1959–1960)
- Montezuma / Savages (1960–1987)
- The Sailor Who Fell From Grace With the Sea (1965–1966)
- The Gypsy Moths (1966–1967)
- The Bronc Rider (1968)
- The Photographer (1969–1970)
- The Yellow Jersey (1976)
- Shadow of God (1982)
- A Cry in the Night (1982)
- Waltz in Marathon (1984)

== Television productions ==
=== Completed television series and films ===
Premiere date	Film	Production company	Distribution Company	Awards
November 1957	King of the Vikings	Brynaprod / Barbizon Productions	Columbia Broadcasting System	
September 1959	Tales of the Vikings	Brynaprod	United Artists Television	
March 7, 1973	Dr. Jekyll and Mr. Hyde	The Bryna Company / Winters/Rosen Productions	National Broadcasting Company	Nominated—Primetime Emmy Award for Outstanding Achievement in Music Direction of a Variety, Musical or Dramatic Program Nominated—Primetime Emmy Award for Outstanding Achievement in Costume Design Nominated—Primetime Emmy Award for Outstanding Achievement in Makeup
May 20, 1984	Draw!	The Bryna Company / Astral Film Productions / HBO Premiere Films	Home Box Office	Genie Award for Best Performance by an Actress in a Supporting Role Nominated—CableACE Award for Film Editing Nominated—Genie Award for Best Achievement in Cinematography Nominated—Genie Award for Best Achievement in Art Direction Nominated—Genie Award for Best Achievement in Sound Editing Nominated—Genie Award for Best Achievement in Overall Sound
September 29, 1985	Amos	The Bryna Company / Vincent Pictures	Columbia Broadcasting System	Nominated—Golden Globe Award for Best Miniseries or Motion Picture Made for Television Nominated—Golden Globe Award for Best Performance by an Actor in a Miniseries or Motion Picture Made for Television Nominated—Golden Globe Award for Best Performance by an Actor in a Supporting Role in a Series, Miniseries or Motion Picture Made for Television Nominated—Primetime Emmy Award for Outstanding Drama/Comedy Special Nominated—Primetime Emmy Award for Outstanding Lead Actor in a Miniseries or a Special Nominated—Primetime Emmy Award for Outstanding Supporting Actor in a Miniseries or a Special Nominated—Primetime Emmy Award for Outstanding Supporting Actress in a Miniseries or a Special
April 23, 1986	Sperry Goes Hollywood	The Bryna Company / Sperry Corporation	Sperry Corporation	

=== Unrealized television projects ===
- Report from Space / Report from Outer Space (1958–1959)
- The Indian Fighter (1958–1959)
- Spartacus (1959)
- The Cruel Sport / Grand Prix (1965–1967)
- Gulliver's Travels (1968)
- Barrymore (1975–1976)
- Seven Days in May (1984–1989)

== Stage productions ==
=== Completed stage productions ===
Opening Date	Closing Date	Play	Production company	Theater
October 24, 1963	October 26, 1963	One Flew Over the Cuckoo's Nest	Eric Productions / Seven Arts Productions	Shubert Theatre, New Haven, Connecticut
October 28, 1963	November 9, 1963	One Flew Over the Cuckoo's Nest	Eric Productions / Seven Arts Productions	Shubert Theatre, Boston, Massachusetts
November 13, 1963	January 25, 1964	One Flew Over the Cuckoo's Nest	Eric Productions / Seven Arts Productions	Cort Theatre, New York City, New York

=== Unrealized stage projects ===
- A Very Special Baby (1956)
- Citizen Tom Paine (1976)
