= A Gunfight =

1971 film by Lamont Johnson

- Theatrical release poster
- Directed by: Lamont Johnson
- Written by: Harold Jack Bloom
- Produced by: Harold Jack Bloom; A. Ronald Lubin
- Starring: Kirk Douglas; Johnny Cash; Jane Alexander
- Cinematography: David M. Walsh
- Music by: Laurence Rosenthal
- Production companies: Joel Productions; Harvest Productions; Thoroughbred Productions
- Distributed by: Paramount Pictures
- Release date: August 25, 1971
- Running time: 88 minutes
- Country: United States
- Language: English
- Budget: $2 million

A Gunfight is a 1971 American Western film directed by Lamont Johnson, starring Kirk Douglas and Johnny Cash.

The film was financed by the Jicarilla Apache Nation, although there are no leading Native American characters in the story.

Douglas' fee was $150,000 plus a percentage of the profits.

== Plot ==
Will Tenneray and Abe Cross are two aging, famous gunfighters, both in need of money. Cross rides into town, having failed as a gold prospector. His reputation is such that everyone expects him to shoot it out with Tenneray, who capitalizes on his legend by working at the saloon to "sucker fools into buying drinks." To the town's surprise, Tenneray and Cross take a liking to one another. There is no hostility between them whatsoever.

Tenneray is desperate for money, however. He comes up with the idea to stage a duel to the death in a bullfight arena, with the ticket proceeds going to the winner. Unfortunately, by killing Cross, he reasons to Nora, his wife, "I could lose my best friend." The actual gunfight is shot in a low-key and unromanticised fashion, and is over in a couple of seconds, Cross killing Tenneray with the first bullet. (This defies conventions with the "man in black" winning.)

There is an extended fantasy sequence near the end, where we see what might have happened if Tenneray had won, which may have confused some viewers. It may be open to interpretation if this is Cross's fantasy or Tenneray's widow's fantasy.

== Cast ==
- Kirk Douglas as Will Tenneray
- Johnny Cash as Abe Cross
- Jane Alexander as Nora Tenneray
- Karen Black as Jenny Sims
- Keith Carradine as Young Gunfighter
- Dana Elcar as Marv
- Raf Vallone as Francisco Alvarez
- Eric Douglas as Bud Tenneray
- Robert J. Wilke as Marshal Tom Cater
- Paul Lambert as Ed Fleury

== Production ==
The film was based on an original script by Harold Bloom who sent it to Kirk Douglas who loved it and decided to star and co-produce. Douglas persuaded Johnny Cash to co star. Finance came in part from the oil-rich Jicarilla tribe, whose head, Chief Charlie, was an admirer of Johnny Cash. Filming took place in New Mexico.

== See also ==
- List of American films of 1971
