= The Last Sunset (film) =

1961 film by Robert Aldrich

- Theatrical release poster
- Directed by: Robert Aldrich
- Written by: Dalton Trumbo
- Based on: Sundown at Crazy Horse by Howard Rigsby
- Produced by: Eugene Frenke; Edward Lewis
- Starring: Rock Hudson; Kirk Douglas; Dorothy Malone; Joseph Cotten; Carol Lynley
- Cinematography: Ernest Laszlo
- Edited by: Michael Luciano
- Music by: Ernest Gold, Tomás Méndez (song "Cu Cu Ru Cu Paloma")
- Color process: Eastman color
- Production company: Brynaprod
- Distributed by: Universal Pictures
- Release date: June 8, 1961 (United States)
- Running time: 112 minutes
- Country: United States
- Language: English
- Budget: $3 million or $3.5 million
- Box office: 1,655,692 admissions (France)

The Last Sunset is a 1961 American Western film directed by Robert Aldrich and starring Rock Hudson, Kirk Douglas, and Dorothy Malone.

The film was released by Universal Pictures and shot in Eastmancolor in Mexico. The screenplay by Dalton Trumbo was adapted from Howard Rigsby's 1957 novel Sundown at Crazy Horse.

The supporting cast features Joseph Cotten, Carol Lynley, Neville Brand and Jack Elam.

== Plot ==
Brendan O'Malley crosses the border into Mexico to escape justice for a murder, pursued by Sheriff Dana Stribling. He arrives at the ranch of a former lover Belle Breckenridge. Brendan is determined to win back Belle.

O'Malley meets her daughter Melissa. The next day, they are joined by the well-mannered drunkard John Breckenridge, Belle's husband. He hires O'Malley to drive his herd to Crazy Horse, Texas. O'Malley accepts under condition that he is paid with one fifth of the herd, and he tells Breckenridge he will take his wife once the cattle drive is finished. Breckenridge doesn't take him seriously.

Stribling arrives at the ranch to serve a warrant for the murder. He does not have jurisdiction to arrest O'Malley in Mexico so he agrees to join the cattle drive to Texas. He promises to deliver O'Malley to the law upon their arrival.

During the cattle drive, Breckenridge separates and goes to a bar where he gets drunk. Two former Confederates confront Breckenridge and accuse him of cowardice during a battle in the Civil War. Although Stribling and O'Malley try to save Breckenridge's life, Breckinridge is shot in the back and killed trying to leave the bar. Stribling and O'Malley respond by shooting the man who shot Breckinridge, and they then bury Breckinridge back at the cattle drive camp.

Along the journey, Stribling and Belle become attracted to each other and plan to marry. O'Malley is crushed when he sees them, and he eventually falls in love with Missy, who convinces him she's not too young for him. O’Malley also finds out that the man he murdered was Stribling's brother-in-law and that his sister hanged herself after the death of her husband.

The group manages to get safely to Texas after a little fiesta where O'Malley sees Missy in the same yellow dress her mother wore when she and O'Malley met. She reminds him of Belle when they were lovers years ago and the two confess their love for each other and kiss. The next day Belle begs Stribling not to confront O’Malley. He has mixed feelings but doesn't want to back down. On the eve of the showdown between the two men, Belle discloses the secret that Missy is the daughter of O'Malley and their incestuous love cannot continue. He is stunned but refuses to believe her. He spends the day with Missy and promises to leave with her. O'Malley then leaves for the gunfight, where he is gunned down by Stribling. Upon looking at O'Malley's gun, Stribling realizes that the pistol was unloaded and that O'Malley had effectively committed suicide.

== Cast ==
- Rock Hudson as Dana Stribling
- Kirk Douglas as Brendan "Bren" O'Malley
- Dorothy Malone as Belle Breckenridge
- Joseph Cotten as John Breckenridge
- Carol Lynley as Melissa "Missy" Breckenridge
- Neville Brand as Frank Hobbs
- Regis Toomey as Milton Wing
- James Westmoreland as Julesburg Kid (credited as Rad Fulton)
- Adam Williams as Calverton
- Jack Elam as Ed Hobbs
- John Shay as Bowman

== Production ==
In 1959, Kirk Douglas announced he had bought the rights to Day of the Gun by Richard Telfair (the pen name for Richard Jessup).

In December 1959, it was announced Douglas and Rock Hudson would star in Day of the Gun from the novel by Howard Vechel, filming to begin in March 1960 in Aguascalientes, Mexico. It was the ninth film from Bryna, Douglas' film production company.

In May 1960, it was announced that Dalton Trumbo was on set working on the script. Trumbo had written Spartacus for Douglas's company and Universal. At this stage, Universal had not decided if Trumbo would get screen credit for his work on Spartacus. However, United Artists had stated it would give Trumbo credit for his work on Exodus.

Douglas wanted Sandra Dee to play a key supporting role. Tuesday Weld then was cast but was unable to do it due to delays on High Time so Carol Lynley played the role.

Douglas hired Robert Aldrich to direct. Aldrich later said he was "dead broke" at the time after having made "two bad pictures" in Europe and spent months on an unsuccessful attempt to make a film of Taras Bulba. Aldrich says the film was a "very unpleasant experience". He says Dalton Trumbo had written a script but left the project to work on Exodus for Otto Preminger because, during this McCarthy period, Preminger had promised Trumbo to credit Trumbo as the screenwriter. He did return to Last Sunset, but Aldrich says "it was too late to save it". Aldrich says "Kirk was impossible. He knew the screenplay wasn't right. The whole thing started badly, went on badly, ended badly. Rock Hudson of all people emerged from it more creditably than anyone. Most people don't consider him a very accomplished actor but I found him terribly hardworking and dedicated and very serious...if everybody on that picture, from producer to writer to other actors, had approached it with the same dedication it would have been a lot better."

During filming, the movie was known as The Day of the Gun, Journey into Sunset and The Hot Eye of Heaven.

"That was a toughie", said Aldrich. "I found it extremely difficult personally to do the film. But in this business you have to stay alive. You have to take subjects like this to make money to eat, to buy more properties and float another project."

Aldrich admitted part of his problem with Douglas was when Douglas discovered Aldrich had three writers, including Lukas Heller, staying with him on the remote film set in Aguas Calientes, on the plain of Northern Mexico, (in Aldrich's words 'terribly rural, primitive, unsophisticated country'), during filming to work on other projects. This upset Douglas, who felt Aldrich should be concentrating on The Last Sunset. "He went berserk", said Aldrich. "He just went crazy." Aldrich sent his writers away to Mexico City.

== See also ==
- List of American films of 1961
