= Tales of the Vikings =

- Starring: Jerome Courtland; Buddy Baer
- Composer: Bert Grund
- Country of origin: United States
- Original language: English
- No. of seasons: 1
- No. of episodes: 27

Production
- Executive producer: Edward Lewis
- Running time: 30 minutes
- Production companies: Brynaprod; United Artists Television

Original release
- Network: Broadcast syndication
- Release: September 8, 1959 – June 2, 1960

Tales of the Vikings is an American first-run syndicated television series, first telecast on September 8, 1959, and ran through June 2, 1960. The series was produced by Kirk Douglas' production company, Brynaprod.

== Plot ==
Set in tenth century Scandinavia, the series presented the seafaring exploits of Viking chief Firebeard and his two sons, Leif and Finn.

== Characters ==
- Stefan Schnabel as Firebeard, Viking chieftain
- Jerome Courtland as Leif Ericson, Firebeard's younger son
- Walter Barnes as Finn, Firebeard's elder son
- Buddy Baer as Haldar, Viking crewman

Guest stars for the thirty-nine episode run included: Christopher Lee, Patrick McGoohan, Robert Alda, and Edmund Purdom.

== Episodes ==
No.	Title	Directed by	Written by	Original release date
1	"Pedigree"	Unknown	Unknown	September 8, 1959
2	"The Black Stone"	George Cahan	Story by : Robert Mitchell; Teleplay by : Robert Mitchell & Sid Morse	September 15, 1959
3	"The Ransom"	Unknown	Unknown	September 22, 1959
4	"Victory Saga"	Unknown	Unknown	September 29, 1959
5	"Journey to Bretland"	Unknown	Unknown	October 6, 1959
6	"Banished Woman"	Unknown	Unknown	October 13, 1959
7	"The Witch"	Unknown	Unknown	October 20, 1959
8	"Shipwreck"	Unknown	Unknown	October 27, 1959
9	"Treasure of Erin"	Unknown	Unknown	November 3, 1959
10	"Return of the Viking"	Unknown	Unknown	November 10, 1959
11	"Saracen Gold"	Unknown	Unknown	November 17, 1959
12	"Return of Aud"	Unknown	Unknown	November 24, 1959
13	"Doom at the All-Thing"	Unknown	Unknown	December 1, 1959
14	"House Divided"	Unknown	Unknown	December 8, 1959
15	"The Weapon"	Elmo Williams	Story by : Fred Freiberger; Teleplay by : Fred Freiberger & Lorraine Williams	December 15, 1959
16	"The Oathbreaker"	Unknown	Unknown	December 22, 1959
17	"The Bread of Life"	Unknown	Unknown	December 29, 1959
18	"The Treasure"	Unknown	Unknown	January 5, 1960
19	"Port of Thieves"	Unknown	Unknown	January 12, 1960
20	"Cold Steel"	Unknown	Unknown	January 19, 1960
21	"The Bowman"	Unknown	Unknown	January 26, 1960
22	"The Dragon"	Unknown	Unknown	February 2, 1960
23	"The Thing"	Unknown	Unknown	February 9, 1960
24	"The Madness"	Unknown	Unknown	February 16, 1960
25	"Blood Sacrifice"	Unknown	Unknown	February 23, 1960
26	"A Marriage of State"	Unknown	Unknown	March 3, 1960
27	"Days of Blood"	Unknown	Unknown	March 10, 1960

== Production ==
In 1949 Douglas founded his own company, Bryna Productions, named after his mother. Tales of the Vikings was the company's first venture into television. The series, like the Douglas' 1958 film The Vikings, was shot in Europe and used footage, sets, props, and costumes from the film. It was filmed in black and white, and distributed by United Artists Television. Since Tales of the Vikings aired in syndication, air dates varied from one TV station to another during the 1959-1960 season. It also aired on British television, and in 1962 in Finland.

Courtland has his hair and beard dyed blond for the series. Ryan O'Neal got his start on Tales of the Viking. His parents, who were living abroad at the time, got the teenager a job as a stuntman, under veteran John Sullivan, learning fights, falls, and duels. The theme song was written by Bert Grund with lyrics by Sid Morse.
