= Paradise Hills, New Mexico =

- Census-designated place
- Location within New Mexico
- Coordinates: 35°11′53″N 106°42′09″W
- Country: United States
- State: New Mexico
- County: Bernalillo

Area
  - Total: 1.02 sq mi (2.65 km^{2})
  - Land: 1.02 sq mi (2.65 km^{2})
  - Water: 0 sq mi (0.00 km^{2})
- Elevation: 5,335 ft (1,626 m)

Population (2020)
  - Total: 4,329
  - Density: 4,233.0/sq mi (1,634.37/km^{2})
- Time zone: UTC-7 (Mountain (MST))
  - Summer (DST): UTC-6 (MDT)
- Area code: 505
- FIPS code: 35-55270
- GNIS feature ID: 2584172

Paradise Hills is a census-designated place (CDP) in Bernalillo County, New Mexico, United States. As of the 2020 census, Paradise Hills had a population of 4,329. It is part of the Albuquerque Metropolitan Statistical Area.

Paradise Hills was developed by the Horizon Corporation, who sold undeveloped land to buyers. The Federal Trade Commission eventually ordered Horizon to pay money to the buyers due to false and misleading ads.

== Geography ==
Paradise Hills is located in northern Bernalillo County on high ground rising to the west of the valley of the Rio Grande. The unincorporated CDP is entirely surrounded by the city of Albuquerque. Paradise Hills is bordered to the east by the Paradise Hills Golf Course, formerly known as Desert Greens Golf Course.

According to the United States Census Bureau, the CDP has a total area of 1.0 square mile (2.6 km^{2}), all land.

== Demographics ==
Historical population
Census	Pop.	Note	%±
2020	4,329		—
U.S. Decennial Census

=== 2020 census ===
As of the 2020 census, Paradise Hills had a population of 4,329. The median age was 42.9 years. 21.5% of residents were under the age of 18 and 21.6% of residents were 65 years of age or older. For every 100 females there were 93.3 males, and for every 100 females age 18 and over there were 93.9 males age 18 and over.

100.0% of residents lived in urban areas, while 0.0% lived in rural areas.

There were 1,712 households in Paradise Hills, of which 28.5% had children under the age of 18 living in them. Of all households, 48.9% were married-couple households, 19.0% were households with a male householder and no spouse or partner present, and 24.9% were households with a female householder and no spouse or partner present. About 25.6% of all households were made up of individuals and 11.7% had someone living alone who was 65 years of age or older.

There were 1,772 housing units, of which 3.4% were vacant. The homeowner vacancy rate was 0.7% and the rental vacancy rate was 3.7%.

Racial composition as of the 2020 census
Race	Number	Percent
White	2,504	57.8%
Black or African American	95	2.2%
American Indian and Alaska Native	138	3.2%
Asian	56	1.3%
Native Hawaiian and Other Pacific Islander	10	0.2%
Some other race	471	10.9%
Two or more races	1,055	24.4%
Hispanic or Latino (of any race)	2,051	47.4%

== Education ==
It is zoned to Albuquerque Public Schools.

== Notable events ==
Kirk Douglas' film production company, Joel Productions, filmed the movie Lonely Are the Brave on location in Paradise Hills. The film began shooting on May 1, 1961, at which time the land was managed by Horizon Land Corporation, a Tucson-based company.
