= Ride Out for Revenge =

1957 film by Bernard Girard

- Directed by: Bernard Girard
- Screenplay by: Norman Retchin
- Produced by: Norman Retchin
- Starring: Rory Calhoun; Gloria Grahame; Lloyd Bridges; Joanne Gilbert
- Cinematography: Floyd Crosby
- Edited by: Leon Barsha
- Music by: Leith Stevens
- Color process: Black and white
- Production company: Bryna Productions
- Distributed by: United Artists
- Release date: November 1, 1957 (United States)
- Running time: 78 minutes
- Country: United States
- Language: English

Ride Out for Revenge is a 1957 American Western film directed by Bernard Girard and starring Rory Calhoun, Gloria Grahame, Lloyd Bridges and Joanne Gilbert.

== Plot ==
Cheyenne Chief Yellow Wolf and son Little Wolf walk to town (the plight of Yellow Wolf's tribe is so dire they walked to town to save their horses) to meet with army Captain George to seek provisions for the upcoming winter. He wants the Indians relocated off of their own land. He pretends to be interested in Yellow Wolf's offer of living together in peace, then his man Garvin murders him in the street. George protests he had only instructed his man to "rough up" Chief Yellow Wolf.

Marshal Tate sides with the tribe and also is in love with Yellow Wolf's daughter, Pretty Willow. His attitude disgusts George, who demands the marshal turn in his badge. Tate does so willingly and tells his nephew Billy it is time they move to another town. Amy Porter, a widow who runs the boardinghouse and loves Tate, tells him she cannot abide his feelings for an Indian woman instead.

After ignoring Tate's warnings that there will be reprisals, George panics when they attack. At first he pleads with Tate for help in killing Little Wolf, then conspires with lies to turn Little Wolf and the Indian natives against Tate, claiming he has selfish motives. Pretty Willow turns against Tate after being convinced he plans to kill her brother.

Angry with his uncle and trying to sneak away, the boy Billy is killed. Tate and Little Wolf end up in a knife fight, while Amy, now regretting her prejudice, takes in Pretty Willow at her home. Capt. George believes he has the situation under control, until Tate turns up alive and well and takes matters into his own hands.

== Cast ==
- Rory Calhoun as Tate
- Gloria Grahame as Amy Porter
- Lloyd Bridges as Capt. George
- Joanne Gilbert as Pretty Willow
- Vince Edwards as Chief Little Wolf
- Richard Shannon as Garvin
- Frank DeKova as Chief Yellow Wolf
- Michael Winkelman as Billy
- Cyril Delevanti as Preacher
