= Harold Jack Bloom =

American screenwriter (1924–1999)

- Born: April 26, 1924; United States
- Died: August 27, 1999 (aged 75); Los Angeles, California, United States
- Other name: Harold Bloom
- Occupations: Screenwriter; Television producer
- Years active: 1948–1989

Harold Jack Bloom (April 26, 1924 – August 27, 1999) was an American television producer and screenwriter who scored a notable hit with his first major screenplay to the classic Anthony Mann Western The Naked Spur in 1953, earning an Oscar nomination in the process.

== Career ==
Apart from the odd film script, most of Bloom's career was spent writing for television. He worked on such series as Bonanza, The Man from U.N.C.L.E. and, in particular, the TV series version of Twelve O'Clock High. He was also co-creator, along with Robert A. Cinader and Jack Webb, of the medical/paramedic drama, Emergency! Its pilot installment, "The Wedsworth-Townsend Act," was the only installment to which he made any major contributions.

When Richard Maibaum was unavailable, the producers of the James Bond film You Only Live Twice hired Bloom to write the screenplay of the film. The producers did not use Bloom's script, but since several of his ideas were eventually written into Roald Dahl's screenplay of the film, Bloom was credited with "additional story material."

Bloom co-produced A Gunfight with Kirk Douglas through his own film production company, Thoroughbred Productions.

One of his last assignments was the well-regarded TV movie Remembrance of Love in 1982, a showcase role for Kirk Douglas as a Holocaust survivor.

== Personal life ==
He was married to actress Carolyn Kearney, with whom he had one child, Charles. Harold Jack Bloom's second marriage, in 1987, was to interior designer Norene Fremont.

Bloom died of cancer on August 27, 1999, at the age of seventy-five.
