= List of Jamie Lee Curtis performances =

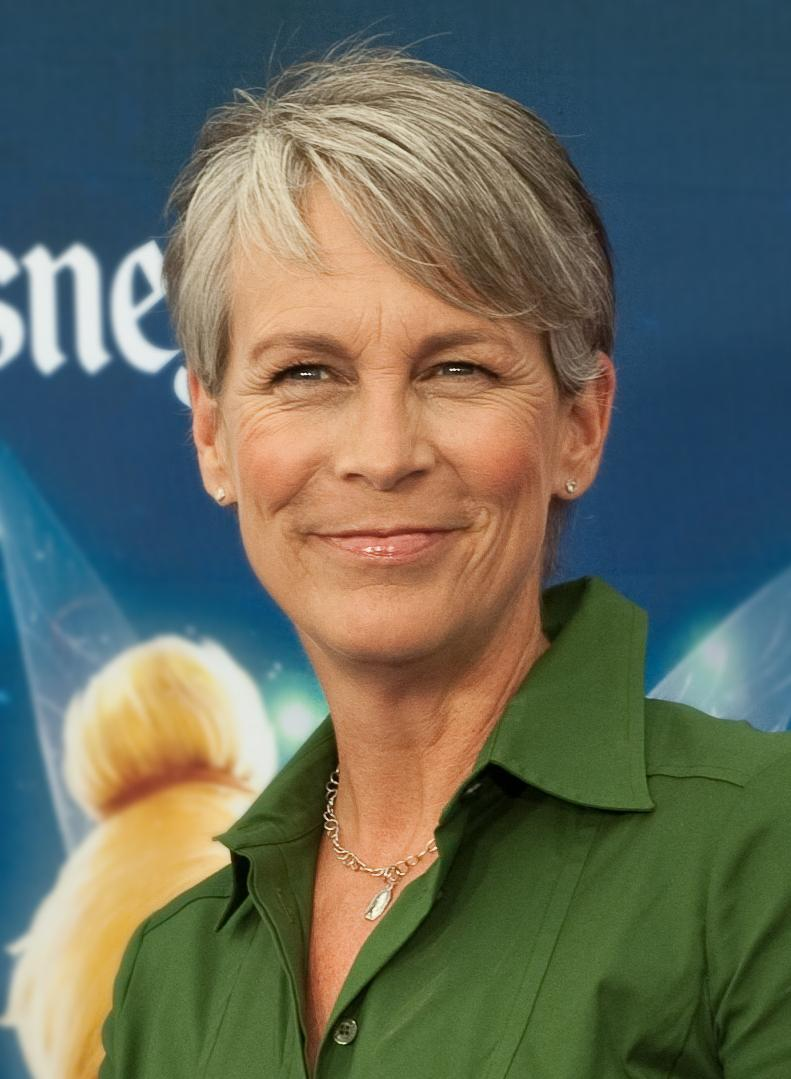
Curtis at the World of Color premiere at Disney California Adventure Park, June 2010

The following is a list of film and television performances by American actress, producer, and children's author Jamie Lee Curtis. She made her film debut in John Carpenter's slasher film Halloween (1978); her role as Laurie Strode established her as a scream queen and led to a string of parts in the horror films The Fog, Prom Night, Terror Train (all 1980) and Roadgames (1981). She reprised the role of Laurie in the Halloween sequels Halloween II (1981), Halloween H20: 20 Years Later (1998), Halloween: Resurrection (2002), Halloween (2018), Halloween Kills (2021), and Halloween Ends (2022). She also had an uncredited voice role in Halloween III: Season of the Witch (1982).

Curtis's film work spans many genres, including the cult comedies Trading Places (1983), for which she won a BAFTA for Best Supporting Actress, and A Fish Called Wanda (1988), for which she received a BAFTA nomination for Best Actress. Her role in the 1985 film Perfect earned her a reputation as a sex symbol. She won a Golden Globe Award for her role as Helen Tasker in James Cameron's action thriller True Lies (1994); she also earned her first SAG Award nomination for that performance. Her performance as Deirdre Beaubeirdre in Everything Everywhere All at Once (2022) earned her the first Academy Award nomination—and win—of her career, for Best Supporting Actress. Her performance also earned her two SAG awards: Outstanding Female Actor in a Supporting Role and Outstanding Cast in a Motion Picture. As of 2026, her films have grossed over $2.8 billion at the box office. Her performance in The Last Showgirl (2024) brought her further critical acclaim and earned her BAFTA and SAG Award nominations for Best Supporting Actress.

On television, Curtis made her acting debut in a season 2 episode of Quincy, M.E. (1977). She received a Golden Globe Award and a People's Choice Award for her role as Hannah Miller on ABC's Anything But Love (1989–1992). She earned another Golden Globe nomination for her role in the television film The Heidi Chronicles (1996) and earned her first Primetime Emmy Award nomination for the fact based drama Nicholas' Gift (1998). She also starred as Cathy Munsch on the Fox series Scream Queens (2015–16), for which she received her seventh Golden Globe nomination, and her second People's Choice Award nomination. In 2023, Curtis guest starred in the second season of the Hulu comedy-drama series The Bear as alcoholic family matriarch Donna Berzatto, for which she received widespread critical acclaim and won the Primetime Emmy Award for Outstanding Guest Actress in a Comedy Series.

== Film ==
List of film credits
Year	Title	Role	Notes	Ref.
1978	Halloween	Laurie Strode		
1980	The Fog	Elizabeth Solley		
1980	Prom Night	Kimberly "Kim" Hammond		
1980	Terror Train	Alana Maxwell		
1981	Escape from New York	Narrator / Computer	Uncredited voice role	
1981	Roadgames	Pamela "Hitch" Rushworth		
1981	Halloween II	Laurie Strode		
1982	Halloween III: Season of the Witch	Telephone Operator	Uncredited voice role	
1982	Coming Soon	Narrator	Documentary film	
1983	Trading Places	Ophelia		
1984	Love Letters	Anna Winter		
1984	Grandview, U.S.A.	Michelle "Mike" Cody		
1984	The Adventures of Buckaroo Banzai Across the 8th Dimension	Sandra Banzai	Featured in extended version only	
1985	Perfect	Jessie Wilson		
1987	A Man in Love	Susan Elliot		
1987	Amazing Grace and Chuck	Lynn Taylor		
1988	Dominick and Eugene	Jennifer Reston		
1988	A Fish Called Wanda	Wanda Gershwitz		
1990	Blue Steel	Officer Megan Turner		
1991	Queens Logic	Grace		
1991	My Girl	Shelly DeVoto		
1992	Forever Young	Claire Cooper		
1993	Mother's Boys	Judith "Jude" Madigan		
1994	My Girl 2	Shelly DeVoto Sultenfuss		
1994	True Lies	Helen Tasker		
1996	House Arrest	Janet Beindorf		
1997	Fierce Creatures	Willa Weston		
1998	Homegrown	Sierra Kahan		
1998	Halloween H20: 20 Years Later	Laurie Strode / Keri Tate		
1999	Virus	Kelly "Kit" Foster		
2000	Drowning Mona	Rona Mace		
2001	The Tailor of Panama	Louisa Pendel		
2001	Daddy and Them	Elaine Bowen		
2001	Rudolph the Red-Nosed Reindeer and the Island of Misfit Toys	Queen Camilla	Voice role	
2002	Halloween: Resurrection	Laurie Strode		
2003	Freaky Friday	Tess Coleman / Anna Coleman		
2004	Christmas with the Kranks	Nora Krank		
2005	The Kid & I	Herself	Cameo appearance	
2008	Beverly Hills Chihuahua	Vivian "Viv" Ashe		
2009	Dirt! The Movie	Narrator	Documentary film	
2010	You Again	Gail Byer Olsen		
2011	The Little Engine That Could	Beverly "Bev"	Voice role	
2011	Still Screaming: The Ultimate Scary Movie Retrospective	Herself	Documentary film	
2012	From Up on Poppy Hill	Ryoko Matsuzaki	Voice role (English dub)	
2014	Veronica Mars	Gayle Buckley		
2015	Spare Parts	Principal Karen Lowry		
2017	Hondros	Executive Producer		
2018	Halloween	Laurie Strode	Also executive producer	
2018	An Acceptable Loss	Rachel Burke		
2019	Knives Out	Linda Drysdale-Thrombey		
2021	Halloween Kills	Laurie Strode	Also executive producer	
2022	Everything Everywhere All at Once	Deirdre Beaubeirdre	Academy Award for Best Supporting Actress	
2022	Halloween Ends	Laurie Strode	Also executive producer	
2023	Haunted Mansion	Madame Leota		
2024	Borderlands	Dr. Patricia Tannis		
2024	The Last Showgirl	Annette		
2025	Freakier Friday	Tess Coleman / Lily Reyes	Also producer	
2025	The Lost Bus	Producer		
2025	Ella McCay	Helen McCay		
2026	The Only Living Pickpocket in New York	Moira	Cameo appearance	
2026	Sender	Lisa Barr	Also producer	

Key
†	Denotes films that have not yet been released

== Television ==
Year	Title	Role	Notes	Ref.
1977	Quincy, M.E.	Girl in Dressing Room	Episode: "Visitors in Paradise"	
1977	The Hardy Boys/Nancy Drew Mysteries	Mary	Episode: "Mystery of the Fallen Angels"	
1977	Columbo	Waitress	Episode: "The Bye-Bye Sky High I.Q. Murder Case"	
1977–1978	Operation Petticoat	Lieutenant Barbara Duran	Main role; 23 episodes	
1978	Charlie's Angels	Linda Frey	Episode: "Winning Is for Losers"	
1978	The Love Boat	Linda	Episode: "Till Death Do Us Part, Maybe/Chubs/Locked Away"	
1979	Buck Rogers in the 25th Century	Jen Burton	Episode: "Unchained Woman"	
1980	Saturday Night Live	Herself (host)	Episode: "Jamie Lee Curtis/James Brown & Ellen Shipley"	
1981	She's in the Army Now	Private Rita Jennings	Television film	
1981	Death of a Centerfold: The Dorothy Stratten Story	Dorothy Stratten	Television film	
1982	Callahan	Rachel Bartlett	Television film	
1982	Money on the Side	Michelle Jamison	Television film	
1984	Saturday Night Live	Herself (host)	Episodes: "Thompson Twins" & "Jamie Lee Curtis/The Fixx"	
1985	Shelley Duvall's Tall Tales & Legends	Annie Oakley	Episode: "Annie Oakley"	
1986	As Summers Die	Whitsey Loftin	Television film	
1989–1992	Anything but Love	Hannah Miller	Main role; 56 episodes (directed episode: "The Call of the Mild")	
1995	The Heidi Chronicles	Heidi Holland	Television film	
1996	The Drew Carey Show	Sioux	Episode: "Playing a Unified Field"	
1998	Nicholas' Gift	Maggie Green	Television film	
2000	Pigs Next Door	Clara	Voice role; Episode: "Movin' On Up"	
2005	A Home for the Holidays	TV Program Host	Television special	
2012	NCIS	Dr. Samantha Ryan	Recurring role; 5 episodes (season 9)	
2012, 2014–2015, 2018	New Girl	Joan Day	Recurring role; 6 episodes (seasons 2–4, 7)	
2014	Only Human	Evelyn Lang	Television film	
2015–2016	Scream Queens	Cathy Munsch	Main role; 23 episodes (directed episode: "Rapunzel, Rapunzel")	
2019	Game Grumps	Herself	Web series; Episode: "Playing Super Mario Party w/ JAMIE LEE CURTIS!"	
2020	Archer	Agent Peregrine Bruchstein	Voice role; Episodes: "The Orpheus Gambit" & "Caught Napping"	
2020	Martha Knows Best	Herself	Episode: "Martha Claus Is Coming to Town"	
2022	Reno 911!	Lieutenant Donna Fitzgibbons	Episode: "Bad Lieutenant Woman"	
2023–2026	The Bear	Donna Berzatto	Recurring role; 12 episodes (seasons 2–5)	
2024	The Sticky	Bo Shea	Episodes: "Blade" & "Apex" (also executive producer)	
2025	Star Trek: Section 31	Control	Television film	
2026	Scarpetta	Dorothy Scarpetta	Main role; 8 episodes (also executive producer)	
2026	Newlyweds	Claudia	Recurring role (also co-creator and executive producer)	

== See also ==
- List of awards and nominations received by Jamie Lee Curtis
