= List of awards and nominations received by Jamie Lee Curtis =

Jamie Lee Curtis awards and nominations
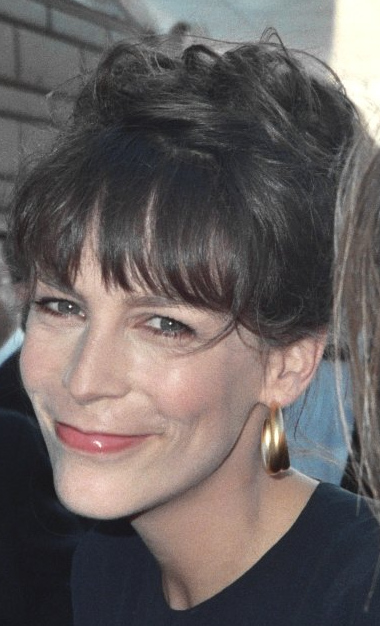
- Curtis at the 41st Primetime Emmy Awards, September 17, 1989
Awards and nominations
Award	Wins	Nominations
Academy Awards	1	1
Actor Awards	2	4
BAFTA Awards	1	4
Critics' Choice Awards	0	3
Emmy Awards	1	4
Golden Globe Awards	2	8
Grammy Awards	0	1

Totals (Note: Certain award groups do not simply award one winner. They acknowledge several different recipients, have runners-up, and have third place. Since this is a specific recognition and is different from losing an award, runner-up mentions are considered wins in this award tally. For simplification and to avoid errors, each award in this list has been presumed to have had a prior nomination.)
- Wins: 39
- Nominations: 103

The following is a list of awards and nominations received by Jamie Lee Curtis.

Jamie Lee Curtis is an American actress, producer, and children's author. Among her various competitive accolades, she is the recipient of one Academy Award, one BAFTA Award (from four nominations), one Primetime Emmy Award (from four nominations), two Golden Globe Awards (from eight nominations), and two Actor Awards (from four nominations). She has also been nominated for three Critics' Choice Awards, one Grammy Award, and one Independent Spirit Award.

Her role as a goodhearted prostitute in John Landis' comedy film Trading Places (1984) won Curtis the BAFTA Award for Best Actress in a Supporting Role. For her comedic leading role in the James Cameron action comedy True Lies (1994), she won the Golden Globe Award for Best Actress in a Motion Picture – Musical or Comedy. For her role as a cantankerous IRS agent in the Daniels science-fiction epic Everything Everywhere All at Once (2022), she won the Academy Award for Best Supporting Actress and the Actor Award for Outstanding Actress in a Supporting Role. Her role as Donna Berzatto in The Bear episode Fishes won her the Primetime Emmy Award for Outstanding Guest Actress in a Comedy Series.

Among her various honorary accolades, Curtis received a star on the Hollywood Walk of Fame in 1998, the Golden Lion Honorary Award at the 78th Venice International Film Festival in 2021, as well as the AARP Movies for Grownups Career Achievement Award and the Maltin Modern Master Award from the Santa Barbara International Film Festival, both in 2023. Curtis was made a Disney Legend in 2024.

== Major associations ==
=== Academy Awards ===
Year	Category	Nominated work	Result	Ref.
2023	Best Supporting Actress	Everything Everywhere All at Once	Won	

=== Actor Awards ===
Year	Category	Nominated work	Result	Ref.
1995	Outstanding Actress in a Supporting Role	True Lies	Nominated	
2023	Outstanding Actress in a Supporting Role	Everything Everywhere All at Once	Won	
2023	Outstanding Cast in a Motion Picture	Everything Everywhere All at Once	Won	
2025	Outstanding Actress in a Supporting Role	The Last Showgirl	Nominated	

=== BAFTA Awards ===
Year	Category	Nominated work	Result	Ref.
British Academy Film Awards
1984	Best Actress in a Supporting Role	Trading Places	Won	
1989	Best Actress in a Leading Role	A Fish Called Wanda	Nominated	
2023	Best Actress in a Supporting Role	Everything Everywhere All at Once	Nominated	
2025	Best Actress in a Supporting Role	The Last Showgirl	Nominated	

=== Critics' Choice Awards ===
Year	Category	Nominated work	Result	Ref.
Critics' Choice Movie Awards
2020	Best Acting Ensemble	Knives Out	Nominated	
2023	Best Acting Ensemble	Everything Everywhere All at Once	Nominated	
2023	Best Supporting Actress	Everything Everywhere All at Once	Nominated	

=== Emmy Awards ===
Year	Category	Nominated work	Result	Ref.
Primetime Emmy Awards
1998	Outstanding Lead Actress in a Miniseries or a Movie	Nicholas' Gift	Nominated	
2024	Outstanding Guest Actress in a Comedy Series	The Bear (episode: Fishes)	Won	
2025	Outstanding Guest Actress in a Comedy Series	The Bear (episode: Ice Chips)	Nominated	
2026	Outstanding Guest Actress in a Comedy Series	The Bear (episode: Tonnato)	Nominated	

=== Golden Globe Awards ===
Year	Category	Nominated work	Result	Ref.
1989	Best Actress in a Motion Picture – Comedy or Musical	A Fish Called Wanda	Nominated	
1990	Best Actress in a Television Series – Comedy or Musical	Anything But Love	Won	
1992	Best Actress in a Television Series – Comedy or Musical	Anything But Love	Nominated	
1995	Best Actress in a Motion Picture – Comedy or Musical	True Lies	Won	
1996	Best Actress – Miniseries or Television Movie	The Heidi Chronicles	Nominated	
2004	Best Actress in a Motion Picture – Comedy or Musical	Freaky Friday	Nominated	
2016	Best Actress in a Television Series – Comedy or Musical	Scream Queens	Nominated	
2023	Best Supporting Actress – Motion Picture	Everything Everywhere All at Once	Nominated	

=== Grammy Awards ===
Year	Category	Nominated work	Result	Ref.
2003	Best Spoken Word Album for Children	The Jamie Lee Curtis Audio Collection	Nominated	

== Critics' awards ==
Year	Association	Category	Work	Result	Ref.
2019	Austin Film Critics Association	Best Ensemble	Knives Out	Won	
2019	Georgia Film Critics Association	Best Ensemble	Knives Out	Nominated	
2019	San Diego Film Critics Society	Best Ensemble	Knives Out	Won	
2019	Seattle Film Critics Society	Best Ensemble	Knives Out	Nominated	
2019	Washington D.C. Area Film Critics Association	Best Ensemble	Knives Out	Won	
2020	Hollywood Critics Association Film Awards	Best Cast Ensemble	Knives Out	Won	
2022	Florida Film Critics Circle	Best Supporting Actress	Everything Everywhere All at Once	Nominated	
2022	Florida Film Critics Circle	Best Cast	Everything Everywhere All at Once	Won	
2022	Hollywood Critics Association Midseason Film Awards	Best Supporting Actress	Everything Everywhere All at Once	Nominated	
2022	Las Vegas Film Critics Society	Best Supporting Actress	Everything Everywhere All at Once	Nominated	
2022	Washington D.C. Area Film Critics Association	Best Supporting Actress	Everything Everywhere All at Once	Nominated	
2022	Washington D.C. Area Film Critics Association	Best Ensemble	Everything Everywhere All at Once	Nominated	
2023	Alliance of Women Film Journalists	Grand Dame Award for Defying Ageism	Everything Everywhere All at Once	Nominated	
2023	Alliance of Women Film Journalists	Best Supporting Actress	Everything Everywhere All at Once	Won	
2023	Alliance of Women Film Journalists	Best Ensemble Cast	Everything Everywhere All at Once	Nominated	
2023	Austin Film Critics Association	Best Supporting Actress	Everything Everywhere All at Once	Nominated	
2023	Austin Film Critics Association	Best Ensemble	Everything Everywhere All at Once	Won	
2023	Georgia Film Critics Association	Best Supporting Actress	Everything Everywhere All at Once	Nominated	
2023	Georgia Film Critics Association	Best Ensemble	Everything Everywhere All at Once	2nd place	
2023	Hollywood Critics Association Film Awards	Best Supporting Actress	Everything Everywhere All at Once	Nominated	
2023	Hollywood Critics Association Film Awards	Best Cast Ensemble	Everything Everywhere All at Once	Won	
2023	Houston Film Critics Society	Best Supporting Actress	Everything Everywhere All at Once	Nominated	
2023	San Diego Film Critics Society	Best Supporting Actress	Everything Everywhere All at Once	Nominated	
2023	San Diego Film Critics Society	Best Ensemble	Everything Everywhere All at Once	Won	
2023	San Francisco Bay Area Film Critics Circle	Best Supporting Actress	Everything Everywhere All at Once	Won	
2023	Vancouver Film Critics Circle	Best Supporting Actress	Everything Everywhere All at Once	Nominated	
2024	San Sebastián International Film Festival	Special Jury Prize (Note: Shared with Kiernan Shipka, Brenda Song, Billie Lourd, Dave Bautista and Pamela Anderson)	The Last Showgirl	Won	
2024	Online Association of Female Film Critics	Best Supporting Female	The Last Showgirl	Nominated	

== Other awards and nominations ==
Year	Association	Category	Work	Result	Ref.
1981	Genie Award	Best Performance by a Foreign Actress	Prom Night	Nominated	
1981	Saturn Award	Best Actress	Terror Train	Nominated	
1984	Jupiter Award	Best International Actress	Trading Places	Nominated	
1986	Jupiter Award	Best International Actress	Perfect	Won	
1988	Golden Apple Award	Female Star of the Year	—	Nominated	
1989	American Comedy Award	Funniest Lead Actress in a Motion Picture	A Fish Called Wanda	Nominated	
1990	Cognac Festival du Film Policier	Special Mention Award	Blue Steel	Won	
1990	Mystfest Award	Best Actress	Blue Steel	Won	
1990	People's Choice Award	Favorite Female Performer in a New Television Series	Anything But Love	Won	
1991	Viewers for Quality Television Award	Best Actress in a Quality Comedy Series	Anything But Love	Nominated	
1995	Fangoria Chainsaw Award	Best Actress	Mother's Boys	Nominated	
1995	American Comedy Award	Funniest Lead Actress in a Motion Picture	True Lies	Won	
1995	Blockbuster Entertainment Award	Favorite Actress – Action/Adventure	True Lies	Nominated	
1995	MTV Movie + TV Award	Best Female Performance	True Lies	Nominated	
1995	MTV Movie + TV Award	Best Kiss (shared with Arnold Schwarzenegger)	True Lies	Nominated	
1995	Saturn Award	Best Actress	True Lies	Won	
1999	Blockbuster Entertainment Award	Favorite Actress – Horor	Halloween H20: 20 Years Later	Nominated	
1999	Fangoria Chainsaw Award	Best Actress	Halloween H20: 20 Years Later	Won	
1999	Saturn Award	Best Actress	Halloween H20: 20 Years Later	Nominated	
2001	DVD Exclusive Award	Best Animated Character Performance	Rudolph the Red-Nosed Reindeer and the Island of Misfit Toys	Nominated	
2004	Satellite Award	Best Actress in a Motion Picture – Comedy or Musical	Freaky Friday	Nominated	
2004	Saturn Award	Best Actress	Freaky Friday	Nominated	
2012	Behind the Voice Actors Award	Best Vocal Ensemble in a Television Special/Direct-to-DVD Title or Short	The Little Engine That Could	Nominated	
2014	Behind the Voice Actors Award	Best Female Vocal Performance in an Anime Feature Film/Special in a Supporting Role	From Up on Poppy Hill	Won	
2014	Behind the Voice Actors Award	Best Vocal Ensemble in an Anime Feature Film/Special	From Up on Poppy Hill	Nominated	
2015	20/20 Award	Best Actress	True Lies	Nominated	
2016	Satellite Award	Best Actress in a Series – Comedy or Musical	Scream Queens	Nominated	
2016	Fangoria Chainsaw Award	Best Television Supporting Actress	Scream Queens	Nominated	
2016	People's Choice Award	Favorite Actress in a New Television Series	Scream Queens	Nominated	
2018	IGN Summer Movie Award	Best Lead Performer in a Movie	Halloween	Nominated	
2018	Fright Meter Award	Best Actress	Halloween	Nominated	
2019	Fangoria Chainsaw Award	Best Actress	Halloween	Nominated	
2019	Saturn Award	Best Actress	Halloween	Won	
2019	National Board of Review	Best Cast	Knives Out	Won	
2019	Satellite Award	Best Cast – Motion Picture	Knives Out	Won	
2020	AARP Movies for Grownups Award	Best Ensemble	Knives Out	Won	
2021	Saturn Award	Best Supporting Actress	Knives Out	Nominated	
2021	People's Choice Award	Drama Movie Star of 2021	Halloween Kills	Nominated	
2022	People's Choice Award	Drama Movie Star of 2022	Halloween Ends	Nominated	
2023	AARP Movies for Grownups Award	Best Supporting Actress	Everything Everywhere All at Once	Nominated	
2023	AACTA International Award	Best Supporting Actress	Everything Everywhere All at Once	Nominated	
2023	Independent Spirit Awards	Best Supporting Performance	Everything Everywhere All at Once	Nominated	
2023	Satellite Award	Best Supporting Actress – Motion Picture	Everything Everywhere All at Once	Nominated	

== Honors ==
Year	Association	Category	Result	Ref.
1998	Hollywood Walk of Fame	Motion Picture – 6600 Hollywood Blvd.	Honored	
2000	Hasty Pudding Theatrical Award	Woman of the Year	Honored	
2021	78th Venice International Film Festival	Golden Lion Honorary Award	Honored	
2022	Las Vegas Film Critics Society	The William Holden Lifetime Achievement Award	Honored	
2023	AARP Movies for Grownups Awards	Career Achievement Award	Honored	
2023	Santa Barbara International Film Festival	Maltin Modern Master Award	Honored	
2023	The Advocate	Advocate of the Year	Honored	
2024	The Walt Disney Company	Disney Legend	Honored	

== See also ==
- List of Jamie Lee Curtis performances
- List of actors with Academy Award nominations
- List of stars on the Hollywood Walk of Fame
- List of actors with Hollywood Walk of Fame motion picture stars
