= Murder of Nicholas Green =

American murdered child

Nicholas Green
- Born: September 9, 1987; San Francisco, California, U.S.
- Died: October 1, 1994 (aged 7); Messina, Italy

Nicholas Green (September 9, 1987 – October 1, 1994) was an American boy who was shot and killed in an attempted car robbery while vacationing with his family in Southern Italy. Robbers mistook their family car for a jeweler's. When Nicholas died, his parents chose to donate his organs. Five people received his major organs, and two received a cornea transplant.

== Death ==
Nicholas Green, his sister, Eleanor Green, and their parents, Margaret and Reginald Green, were having a holiday in Calabria, Southern Italy. On the night of September 29, 1994, his parents were driving on the A3 motorway between Salerno and Reggio Calabria. They stopped at an Autogrill, where two men started following their car, believing they were jewelers. The men pulled up alongside the Greens' vehicle and shouted something in Italian, which the Greens did not understand. Reginald Green accelerated, and the men fired shots into the rear of the car. He accelerated a second time, and once again the men shot into the back of the car. After the pursuers gave up, Reginald stopped the car, and, at that point, he and Margaret realized that Nicholas had been shot in the head. They drove directly to the nearest town, but the hospital was not equipped to deal with Nicholas' injuries. The police took the family to Villa San Giovanni, where they transferred to a ferry which brought them across the Strait of Messina to the port of Messina. From there, the police took them to a specialist head injuries unit at a nearby hospital, where he was pronounced dead the next day.

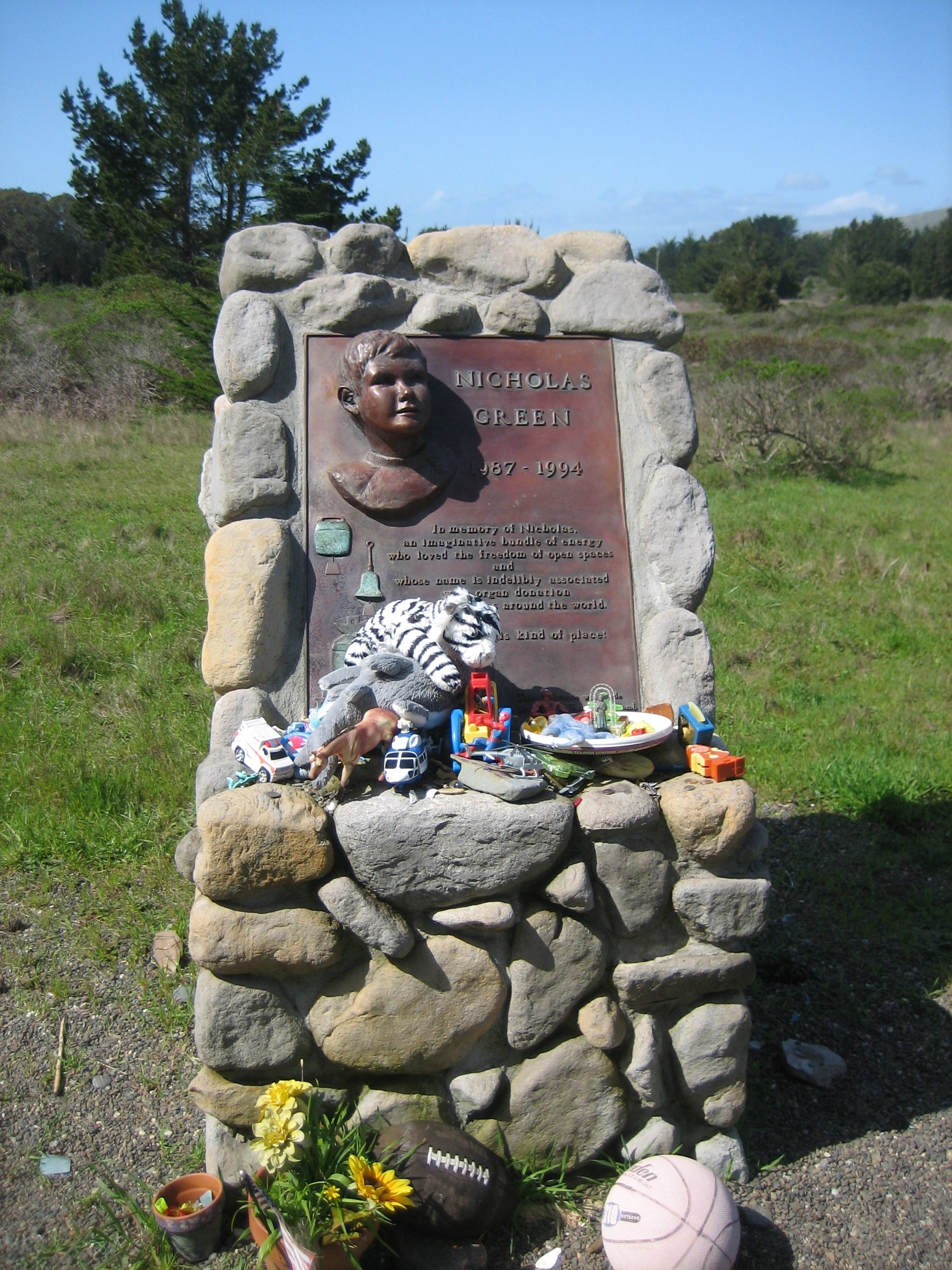
Monument erected for Nicholas Green

== Aftermath ==
=== Trial ===
Following the shooting, Italian police arrested two Mafia men on November 2, 1994, Francesco Mesiano and Michele Iannello. They were tried in Catanzaro by a court consisting of three judges, and, on January 17, 1997, they were found not guilty. Reginald Green had been unable to identify them, as it was dark and both shooters had been wearing masks. However, a year later, an appellate court with a jury convicted the pair. Iannello was sentenced to life imprisonment, and Mesiano was sentenced to 20 years. This decision was upheld by Italy's supreme court in 1999. The killer (Michele Iannello) later confessed other crimes but claimed that his brother (Giuseppe Iannello) is the murderer of Nicholas Green.

=== Organ donation and legacy ===
After Nicholas' death, donation rates increased dramatically in Italy, a country where organ donations had been among the lowest in Europe. According to 2017 data, organ donations in Italy have more than tripled since. Nicholas' name continues to be associated with organ donation, and is acknowledged as the most famous organ donor in the world. The result of his parents' decision has been called "The Nicholas Effect" (l'Effetto Nicholas) and refers not only to organ donation but also to everything good that emerged from the tragedy. Following their decision to donate Nicholas' organs, Nicholas' parents were received by Italy's president (Oscar Luigi Scalfaro). They were awarded Italy's highest honour for civilians "Medaglia d'Oro al Merito Civile".

== Memorials ==
A memorial bell tower (The Children's Bell Tower) has been built in Bodega Bay, California in memory of Nicholas Green and all the children, using more than 140 bells sent to the Greens from individuals, families, schools, and churches all over Italy. The monument, set in Bodega Bay, where Nicholas and his family lived, has become a place of pilgrimage as well as a tourist attraction. The central bell, donated by the Marinelli Foundry, that has been making bells for the Papacy for more than 1000 years, was blessed by Pope John Paul II. It has the names of the seven recipients of Nicholas' organs inscribed on it. The monument is the work of San Francisco sculptor Bruce Hasson.

Another sculpture, called "The Birds", has been donated by the Greens to the Calabria Region and is located at the Regional Council Palace. It depicts seven birds (like Nicholas' organs that were donated and the number of the recipients) made of steel, floating in a sort of tower. This monument is also the work of Bruce Hasson. He used the steel of guns confiscated by the San Francisco Police Department.

An educational video has been made out of their story, called 'The Nicholas Effect'. It is currently shown in hospitals all around the United States and is used by procurement organizations, hospitals, churches, to spread a message of solidarity and the importance of donation. It tells the story of Nicholas, how his organs saved the lives of seven very sick Italians, and how this thing changed the attitude of a whole country towards organ donation. Since Nicholas died, organ donation rates in Italy have more than tripled, bringing Italy from being at the bottom among European Countries in donation to one of the top of the list (currently Italy is second, after Spain, as far as organ donation rates).

Reginald Green wrote two books: the first called "The Nicholas Effect" ("Il Dono di Nicholas", in Italian) and the second called "The Gift that Heals" ("Il Dono che Guarisce", in Italian), published jointly with UNOS (United Network for Organ Sharing) - the non-profit organization that manages the United States's organ transplant system under contract with the federal government. Both books have been highly acclaimed by media and specialists of organ donation all around the world. They are used in nursing schools, hospitals, churches, since the books are considered a complete and useful work on organ donation.

The Greens also established an annual scholarship for primary and middle school children in the United States that is awarded to a distinguished student in each state. The award is managed by the NAGC (the National Association for Gifted Children).

The World Transplant Game Federation dedicated to Nicholas Green the ski race for transplanted children: it is the "Nicholas Cup". It has been held in Nendaz, Switzerland in 2001, Bormio in Northern Italy in 2004, Poland in 2005, Rovaniemi, Finland in 2008, Anzere, Switzerland in March 2012 and La Chapelle D'Abondance France in January 2014.

In 1998, a TV movie, Nicholas' Gift, starring Jamie Lee Curtis and Alan Bates, was based on the event.

Several schools, streets, gardens and squares in Italian cities have been named or renamed in honor of Nicholas Green. For the full list of places named for Nicholas Green in Italy and a map, visit Map of places named for Nicholas in Italy.

== Location ==
The Children's Bell Tower is located in Bodega Bay, off Route 1. GPS (N 38° 20.448 W 123° 03.126)

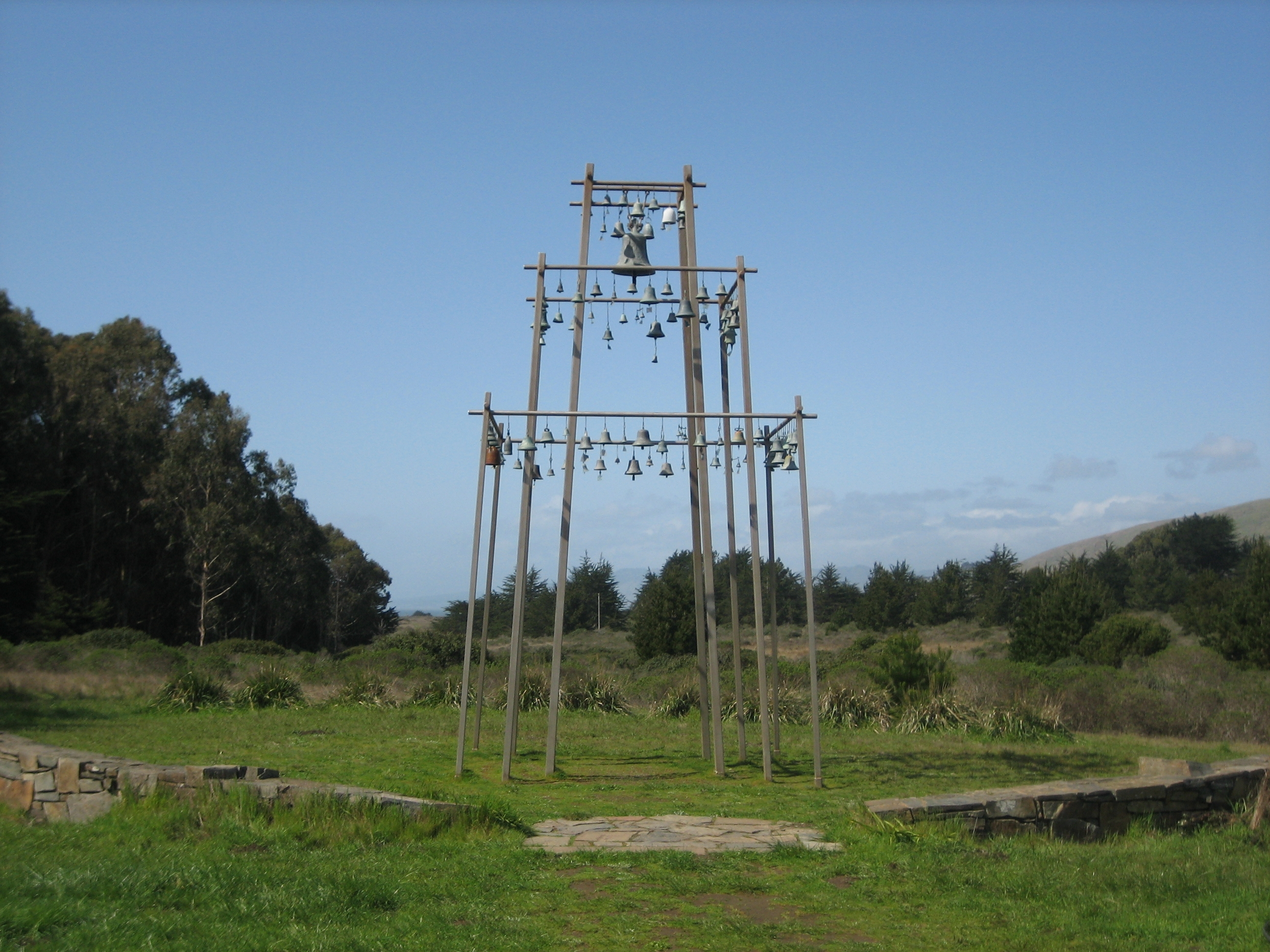

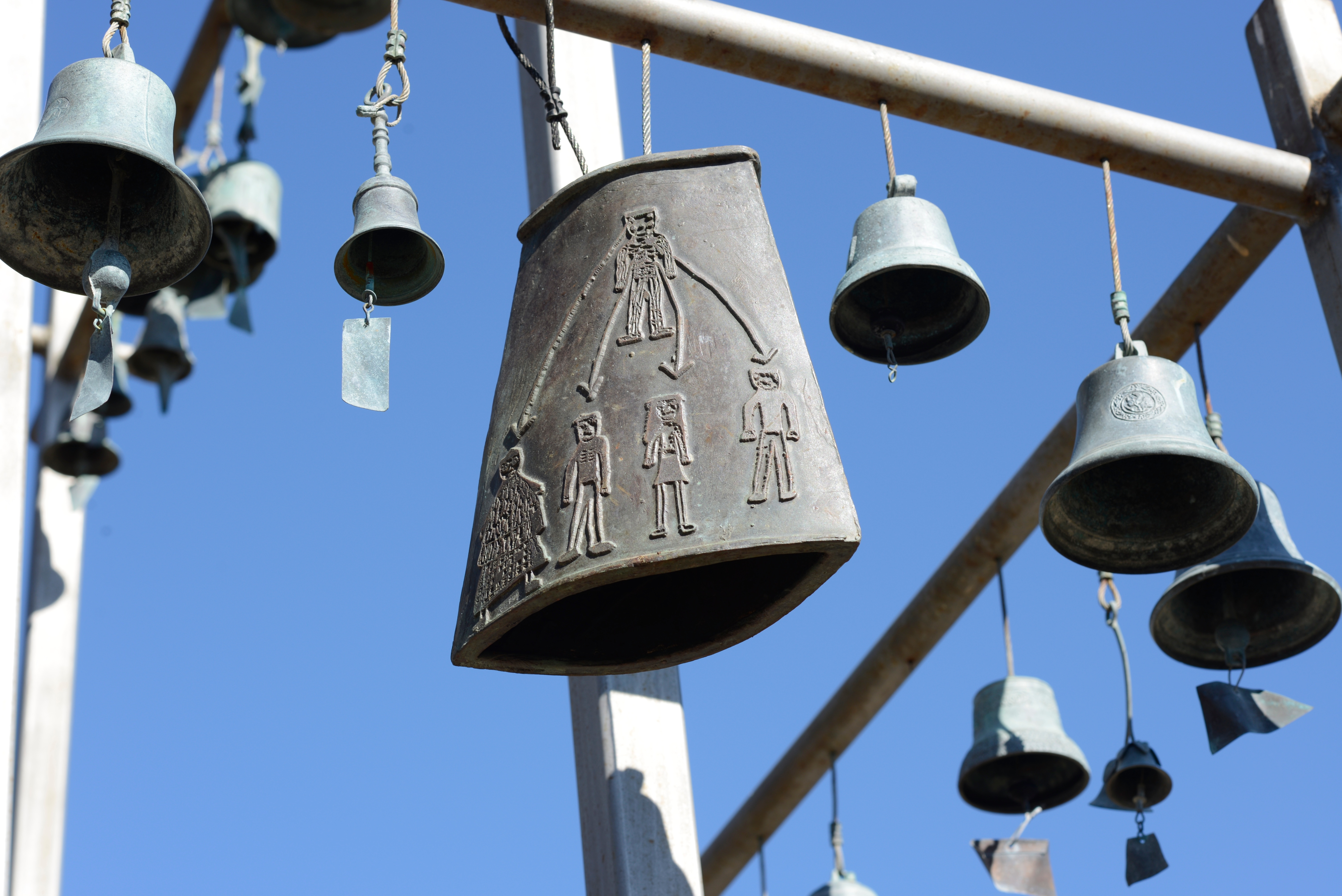
