= Mother Nature (disambiguation) =

Mother Nature is a personification of nature that focuses on the life-giving and nurturing aspects of nature by embodying it in the form of the mother.

Mother Nature may also refer to:

- Mother Nature (film), a 2005 Italian comedy film
- "Mother Nature" (The Temptations song), 1972 song by The Temptations
- "Mother Nature" (MGMT song), 2023 song
- Mother Nature (comic book), debut graphic novel by Jamie Lee Curtis
- Mother Nature, 2019 studio album by The Dangerous Summer
- Mother Nature, 2021 studio album by Angélique Kidjo
- Mother Nature, 2021 EP by Josh Klinghoffer as Pluralone
- "Mother Nature" (Eva Marija song), 2026 song by Eva Marija
- "Mother Nature" (The Fosters), season two episode
- "Mother Nature" (Black-ish), season four episode
- Mother Nature Cambodia, Cambodian environmental activist group

== See also ==
- Mother Earth (disambiguation)
