= Magic Sticks (film) =

1987 film by Peter Keglevic

- Directed by: Peter Keglevic
- Written by: Peter Keglevic; George Kranz; Christopher Ragazzo
- Starring: George Kranz; Kelly Curtis; Chico Hamilton
- Cinematography: Edward Kłosiński
- Edited by: Darren Kloomok
- Music by: George Kranz
- Production companies: Atlas Trio Filmkunst; Maran Film; Tale Film; Westdeutscher Rundfunk
- Release date: June 25, 1987 (West Germany)
- Countries: West Germany; United States
- Language: English

Magic Sticks is a 1987 West German-American comedy film directed by Peter Keglevic and starring George Kranz (who also co-wrote the film) and Kelly Curtis. It features one of Samuel L. Jackson's early film appearances.

== Plot ==
Penniless drummer Felix is down-and-out in New York City before he receives a pair of magical drumsticks as a gift, which make New Yorkers dance to their rhythm. Two gangsters sense a big score and plan to get rich with the help of the sticks, as Felix and his new girlfriend make their way through the metropolis.

== Cast ==
- George Kranz as Felix
- Kelly Curtis as Shirley
- Chico Hamilton as Mr. Jazz
- David Margulies as Goldfarb
- Jack McGee as McShady
- John Gallagher as Trenchcoat
- Reginald VelJohnson as Licorice
- Joe Silver as Pawnbroker
- Samuel L. Jackson as Bum (as Sam Jackson)
- Mike Hodge as Lieutenant
- Kim Yancey as Desk Sergeant
- John Canada Terrell as John the Manager
- Mike Starr as Debt Collector (as Michael Starr)
- Lauren Tom as Redhead
- Stacy Haiduk as Laundromat Lady

== Production ==
A West German-American co-production, the film was shot in New York City in English, but never reached theaters in the U.S.; a German-language dub did get a commercial release. The film features Samuel L. Jackson in one of his earliest roles as the bum who sells Felix the magical drumsticks.

Evan Dunsky was an assistant director on the film. Dunsky would go on to become known for directing The Alarmist (1997).
