= Allegra Curtis =

German-American actress (born 1966)

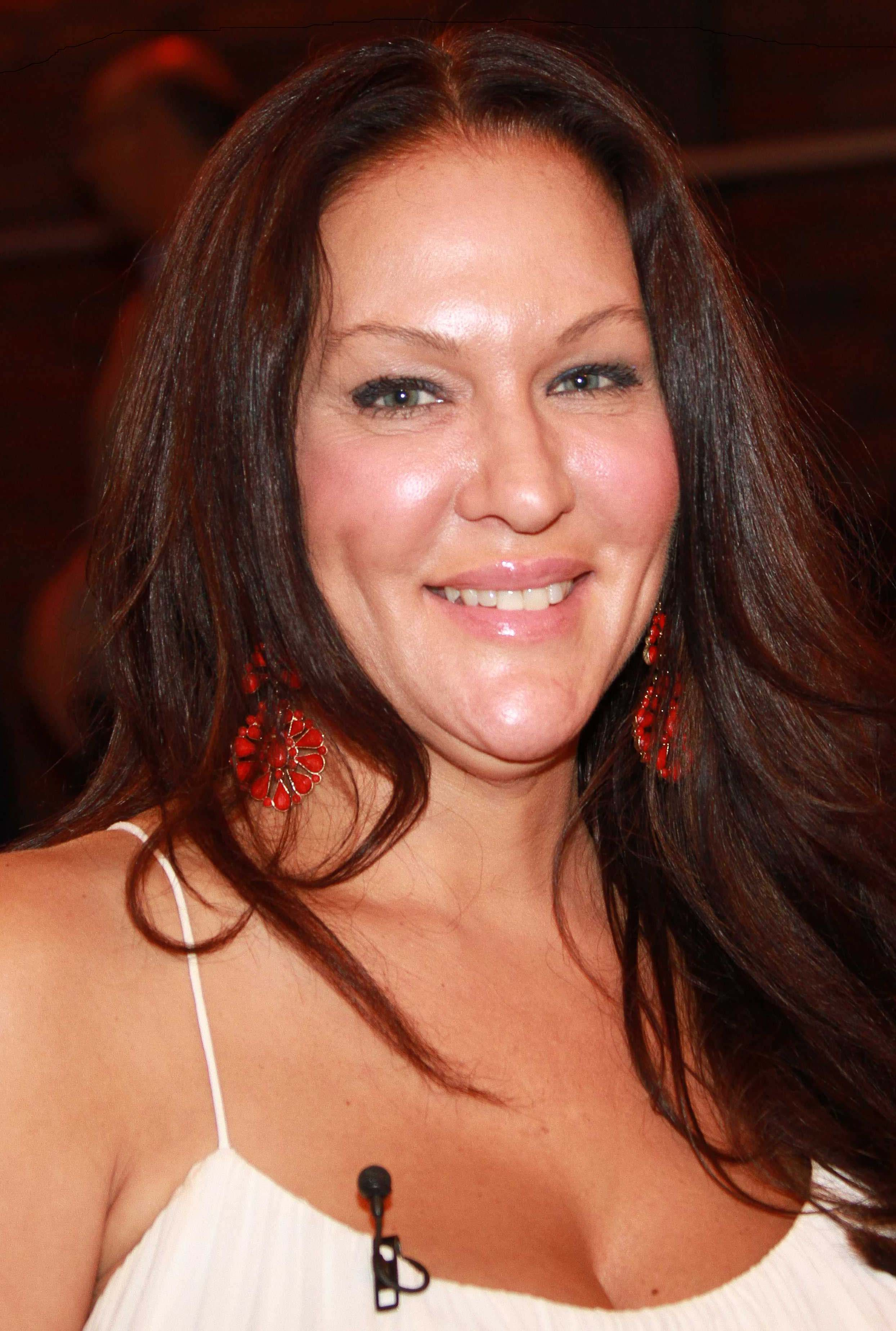
- Curtis in 2013
- Born: July 11, 1966 (age 59); Los Angeles, California, U.S.
- Occupations: Actress, businesswoman
- Years active: 1972–present
- Children: 1
- Parents: Tony Curtis (father); Christine Kaufmann (mother)
- Relatives: Kelly Curtis (paternal half-sister); Jamie Lee Curtis (paternal half-sister)

Allegra Curtis (born July 11, 1966) is an American-born actress and businesswoman who has worked in English and German movies. She is known for her work in movies, particularly Das Gold der Liebe (1983) and Flashback (2000) as well as her participation in the German TV series Ich bin ein Star – Holt mich hier raus! in 2013.

== Personal life ==
Curtis lives in Wilmington, North Carolina. She is the daughter of American actor Tony Curtis and Austrian-German actress Christine Kaufmann. She is the younger sister of Alexandra Curtis who is also an actress. Actresses Kelly and Jamie Lee Curtis are her paternal half-sisters. Her paternal grandparents were Hungarian-Jewish immigrants.

After Christine Kaufmann's death in March 2017, Curtis announced in October 2017 that she would be continuing with her mother's cosmetics line.
