= The Devil's Daughter (1991 film) =

- Directed by: Michele Soavi
- Written by: Dario Argento; Michele Soavi; Gianni Romoli
- Produced by: Dario Argento
- Starring: Kelly Curtis; Herbert Lom; Tomas Arana; Dario Casalini
- Cinematography: Raffaele Mertes
- Edited by: Franco Fraticelli
- Music by: Pino Donaggio
- Release date: 1991
- Running time: 116 minutes
- Country: Italy
- Languages: English; Italian
- Budget: $2 million

The Devil's Daughter, also known as The Sect (Italian: La Setta) is a 1991 Italian horror film co-written and produced by Dario Argento, directed by Michele Soavi, and starring Kelly Curtis and Herbert Lom. It follows an American schoolteacher living in Frankfurt who finds herself at the center of a plot devised by a Luciferian cult.

== Plot ==
In 1970 in Southern California, a group of hippies and their children are approached at a desert encampment by Damon, a wayward traveler. They welcome him and serve him a meal. At nightfall, he kills each of them in ritualized murders with the help of several assailants, invoking Lucifer during the killings.

In 1991 Frankfurt, Germany, a man named Martin Romero pursues Mary Crane through the city streets before murdering her in her home. When confronted in a U-Bahn station by police, he claims to have been forced to commit the crime before taking a gun and killing himself. Meanwhile, schoolteacher Miriam Kreisl nearly hits an elderly man, Moebius Kelly, with her car, near Seligenstadt. Unaware that he is in fact an elder of a Satanic sect, she invites him to stay at her home. While she sleeps, he releases a beetle on her body which crawls into her nose. After, Miriam is woken by a disturbing nightmare, and finds Moebius unable to breathe.

She leaves the house to retrieve a doctor; meanwhile, Moebius, having faked his condition, ventures into a secret tunnel leading to caverns beneath Miriam's home—a place she is unaware of—and performs a Satanic ritual. Miriam returns with Dr. Franz Pernath, and the two discover the open passageway. In a chamber, they find Moebius's dead body with a shroud over his face. Police remove his body, and the event leaves Miriam rattled. Alone at the house, Miriam's pet rabbit enters the underground chamber, forcing her to chase after it. She discovers a woman hiding in the chamber who has stolen one of her nylon stockings. She fights with the woman and demands to know how she got there, but the woman flees the house into the night.

The following day, Claire Heinz, the mother of one of Miriam's students, goes missing. When Miriam brings Claire's daughter home, she speaks with Mr. Heinz, who informs her that Claire, an entomologist, had recently discovered an extinct species of beetles from 10,000 years ago. While viewing an illustration of the beetle, Miriam is inexplicably overwhelmed and loses consciousness. Later, at Miriam's house, her friend Kathryn is attacked by a shroud of Turin, and flees in terror. After, Miriam receives a mysterious phone call from Moebius.

Later, at a truck stop, Kathryn uncharacteristically propositions a man for sex. During the liaison, she brandishes a butcher knife. When the man's friends come to look for him, they discover him hysterically stabbing Kathryn; he claims he was "only doing what she wanted." Doctors attempt to resuscitate Kathryn in the hospital with a defibrillator, but she dies on the operating table. The surgeon (Dr. Pernath, Franz's aunt) informs Miriam that during a moment of lucidity, Kathryn begged to see her. Miriam is allowed into the operating room to view Kathryn's body, which inexplicably comes to life. She attacks Miriam before slitting her own throat, and collapses, dead. The surgeon explains it as a potential case of catalepsy, but Miriam is no less disturbed.

To prove that Moebius is dead, Franz ventures to the hospital's mausoleum to uncover his body, but finds it has disappeared. Simultaneously, Dr. Pernath brings Claire, drugged, to Damon and other members of the sect in the woods near Miriam's home. While Miriam sleeps, Franz explores the underground chamber, and finds a tunnel in a well that leads outside to the woods, where Damon, Dr. Pernath, and the others are performing a ritual on Claire's body that seems to restore life to Moebius. He disrupts the ritual and is chased by the sect into the well.

Miriam awakens shortly after, and finds Franz under the spell of the sect, attempting to kill her. She flees in her car, but accidentally crashes, and is forced to return to her house on foot. Franz is left at the car, which is profusely leaking gasoline, ending in an explosion which kills him. At the home, Miriam is confronted by Moebius, who explains to her that the sect has, unbeknownst to her, guided and orchestrated her life to fit their master plan: she will give birth to the Antichrist. The sect impregnates Miriam in the well, and in a dilation of time, she births the child. When Moebius hands her her son, Miriam flees, and leaps into the fire caused by the car accident. At dawn, firemen extinguish the flames, and Miriam emerges unscathed, her child having sacrificed himself to protect her.

== Cast ==
- Kelly Curtis as Miriam Kreisl
- Herbert Lom as Moebius Kelly
- Mariangela Giordano as Kathryn
- Michel Hans Adatte as Franz Pernath
- Carla Cassola as Dr. Pernath
- Angelika Maria Boeck as Claire Heinz
- Giovanni Lombardo Radice as Martin Romero
- Niels Gullov as Mr. Heinz
- Tomas Arana as Damon
- Dario Casalini as Mark
- Paolo Pranzo as Steven
- Yasmine Ussani as Samantha
- Erica Sinisi as Sara
- Donald O'Brien as Jonathan Ford
- Michele Soavi as magician on TV

== Production ==
The film was produced by Mario and Vittorio Cecchi Gori who re-teamed with Michele Soavi and Dario Argento after previously working together on the 1989 film The Church. The film was shot under the title of The Sect when it was filmed in the Fall of 1990 Soavi incorporated concepts from two unmade scripts he'd developed for the Goris, The Well and Catacombs the latter of which he co-wrote with Gianni Romoli, while the film's prologue set in the 70s was written by Argento. Despite not being a fan of horror, Kelly Curtis agreed to star as she liked the style and psychological aspects of Soavi's Stage Fright and Argento's Suspiria and saw The Sect as more of an Alice in Wonderland fantasy.

== Release ==
The Devil's Daughter was released in Italy in early 1991. The film was shown under the title The Sect at the 1991 Toronto Festival of Festivals as part of their Midnight Madness screening.

== Reception ==
Maitland McDonagh of GoreZone found the film "a welcome change of pace from the minimalist slasher flicks that still dominate the racks at video stores." On review aggregator website Rotten Tomatoes, the film holds an approval rating of 60% based on 5 reviews, with an average rating of 5.3/10.
