= Kelly Curtis =

American actress (1956–2026)

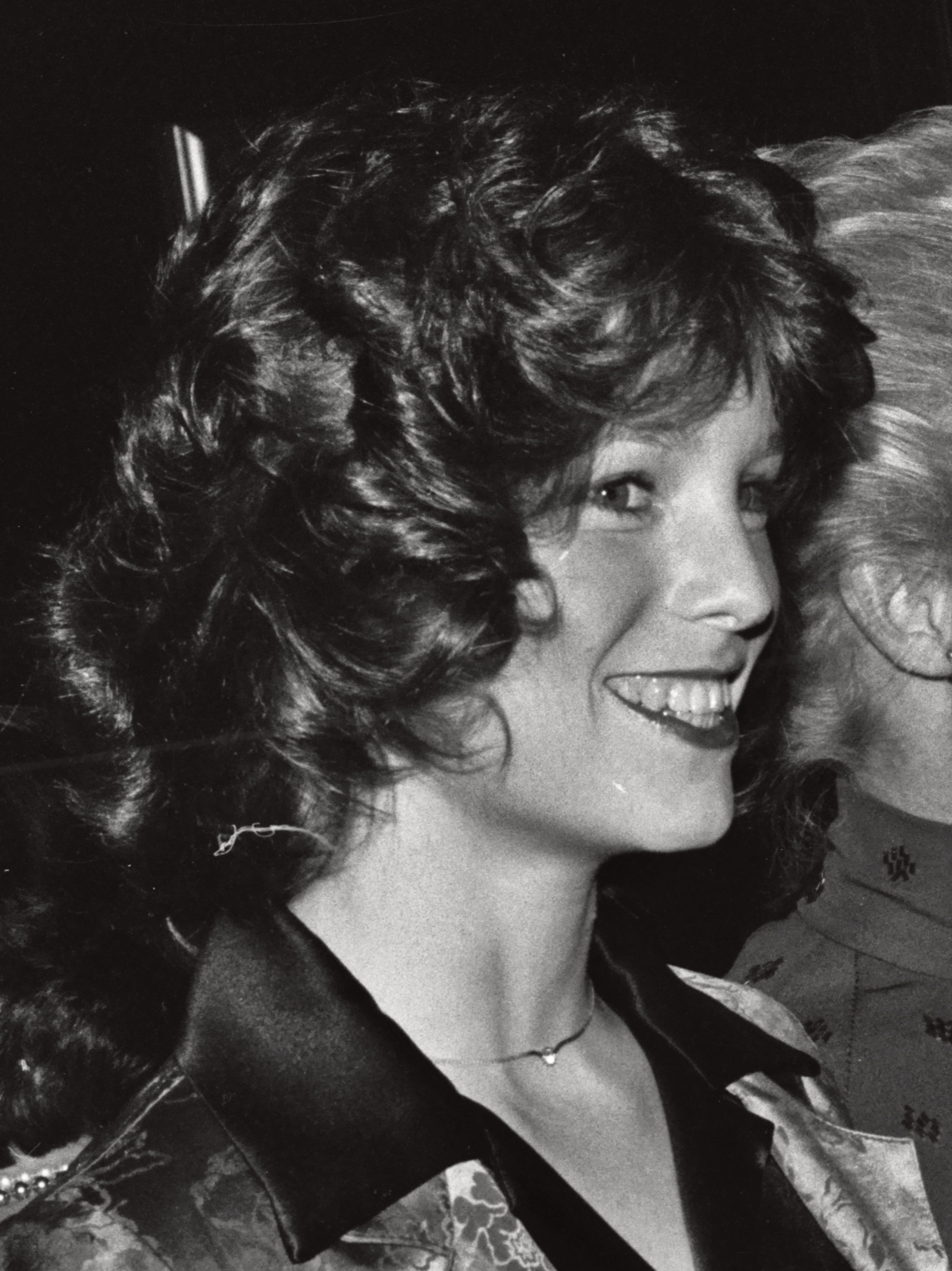
- Curtis in 1979
- Born: Kelly Lee Curtis; June 17, 1956; Santa Monica, California, U.S.
- Died: May 30, 2026 (aged 69); Bellevue, Idaho, U.S.
- Occupation: Actress
- Years active: 1958, 1983–2010
- Spouses: Scott Morfee (m. 1989); John Marsh
- Parents: Tony Curtis (father); Janet Leigh (mother)
- Relatives: Jamie Lee Curtis (sister); Allegra Curtis (half-sister)

Kelly Lee Curtis (June 17, 1956 – May 30, 2026) was an American actress. She was known for her roles in Magic Sticks (1987) and The Devil's Daughter (1991).

== Early life ==
Kelly Lee Curtis was born on June 17, 1956, in Santa Monica, California, the elder child of actors Tony Curtis and Janet Leigh. She was the older sister of actress Jamie Lee Curtis. Her paternal grandparents were Hungarian-Jewish immigrants, and two of her maternal great-grandparents were Danish. The rest of her mother's ancestry was German and Scots-Irish. She had four half-siblings from her father's later marriages: Alexandra Curtis, Allegra Curtis, Nicholas Curtis (who died of a drug overdose) and Benjamin Curtis.

Curtis made her first appearance on film as a young girl in the United Artists action-adventure The Vikings (1958), which starred her parents. Her parents divorced in 1962, and her mother later married Robert Brandt.

In 1978, she graduated from Skidmore College in Saratoga Springs, New York, with a degree in business, and worked briefly as a stockbroker.

== Career ==
Curtis studied acting at the Lee Strasberg Theatre Institute. An article in the Los Angeles Times of July 28, 1982, about the play Say Goodnight, Gracie reads, in part, "Kelly Curtis is Ginny, sadly resigned to not being smart but smartly settled for honest responses. Here, writing and performance transcend one-note designation. Seated quietly, Curtis delivers a touching monologue that would have been the heart of another and better play, rather than a disarming moment of inspired simplicity."

She played Shirley in the comedy Magic Sticks (1987) and starred in the leading role of Miriam Kreisl in the horror film The Devil's Daughter (1991).

She was a regular cast member as Lieutenant Carolyn Plummer during the first season of the crime-action television series The Sentinel (1996). Her guest appearances on TV included roles in The Renegades (1983), Star Trek: Deep Space Nine (1993) and Judging Amy (1999). She also worked as a production assistant on several films with her sister, Freaky Friday (2003), Christmas with the Kranks (2004) and You Again (2010).

== Personal life and death ==
Curtis married Scott Morfee (born 1954) on September 14, 1989. At the time the couple were working together on his musical theater piece, Shout and Twist, in which she appeared and also produced. She later married filmmaker John Marsh, with whom she made local documentaries.

Curtis died at her home in Bellevue, Idaho of natural causes, on May 30, 2026, at the age of 69. She spent a week in hospice care before her death. Her death was announced by her sister, Jamie Lee, on social media.

== Filmography ==
=== Film ===
Kelly Curtis film credits
Year	Title	Role	Notes
1958	The Vikings	Young Girl	Uncredited
1983	Trading Places	Muffy	
1987	Magic Sticks	Shirley	
1987	Checkpoint	Joyce	
1991	The Devil's Daughter	Miriam Kreisl	Starring role
1992	Ex-Cop	Officer	
1998	Mixed Blessings	Annie Weaver	
1998	June		Short film

=== Television ===
Kelly Curtis Television credits
Year	Title	Role	Notes
1983	The Renegades	Cynthia Holtson	Episode: "Target: Marciano"
1986	The Equalizer	Vicki	Episode: "No Conscience"
1988	The Equalizer	Paula Whitaker	Episode: "No Place Like Home"
1989	Kojak: Ariana	Whitley	TV movie
1990	Thanksgiving Day	Barbara Schloss	TV movie
1991	Hunter	Amy Rivers	Episode: "The Reporter"
1991	False Arrest	Mary Durand	TV movie
1992	Silk Stalkings	Sara Lawton	Episode: "Curtain Call"
1993	Star Trek: Deep Space Nine	Miss Sarda	Episode: "Captive Pursuit"
1994	Search and Rescue	Susan	TV movie
1996	The Sentinel	Lt. Carolyn Plummer	7 episodes
1999	LateLine	Shelly	Episode: "Karp's Night Out"
1999	Judging Amy	Leslie Wirth	Episode: "Last Tango in Hartford"

== Production crew ==
- Freaky Friday (2003), production assistant
- Christmas with the Kranks (2004), assistant
- You Again (2010), assistant
