= Mother Nature (comic book) =

2023 graphic novel by Jamie Lee Curtis

Publication information
- Publisher: Titan Comics
- Format: Limited series
- Publication date: July 2023 - July 2023
- No. of issues: 1

Creative team
- Created by: Jamie Lee Curtis Russell Goldman and Karl Stevens

Mother Nature is a graphic novel created by actress Jamie Lee Curtis adapted from her screenplay of an upcoming film for Blumhouse Productions and her production company Comet Pictures. The comic, billed as eco-conscious fiction, follows Nova Terrell, a young woman whose father was killed on the site of Cobalt Corporation, a corrupt oil company, discovering she has supernatural powers.

The main character, Nova Terrel, uses vigilant tactics of vandalism and sabotage against Cobalt Corporation.

The comic was debuted at San Diego Comic-Con 2023, during which Jamie Lee Curtis introduced the comic. SDCC attendees had the chance to buy an early release of the comic. In addition, there were 100 copies of an alternative cover.

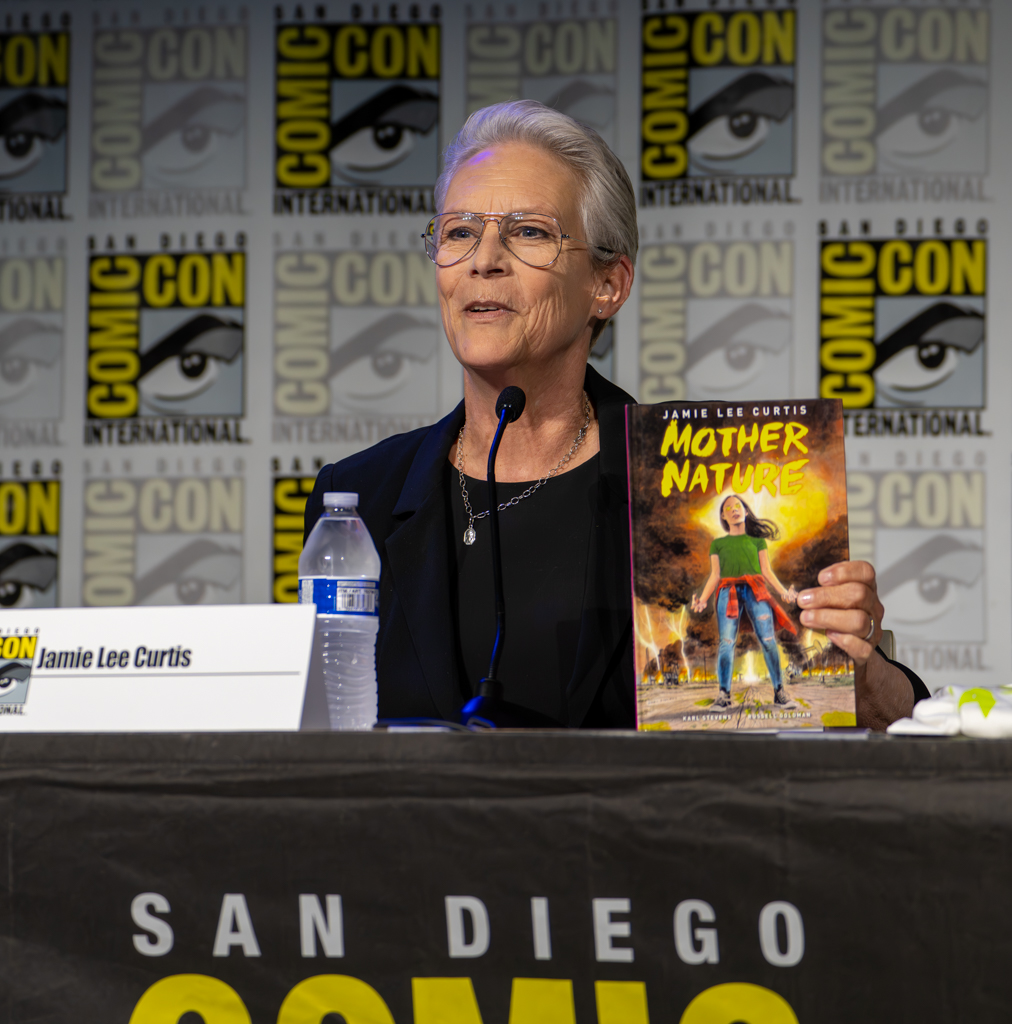
Jamie Lee Curtis Mother Nature at San Diego Comic Con 2023

== Plot ==
Nova Terrel watched her father die on a Cobalt Corporation oil extraction, she grows up hating the company. The story takes place in the fictional town of Catch Creek, New Mexico. She goes on a revenge campaign of vigilantism using vandalism and sabotage against Cobalt Corporation.

== Main characters ==
  - Nova Terrell: The protagonist.
  - Kai: Nova's mother.
  - Cobalt Corporation: The seemingly benevolent but secretly sinister energy company exploiting the land and its water.
