= Jamie Lee Curtis =

American actress and author (born 1958)

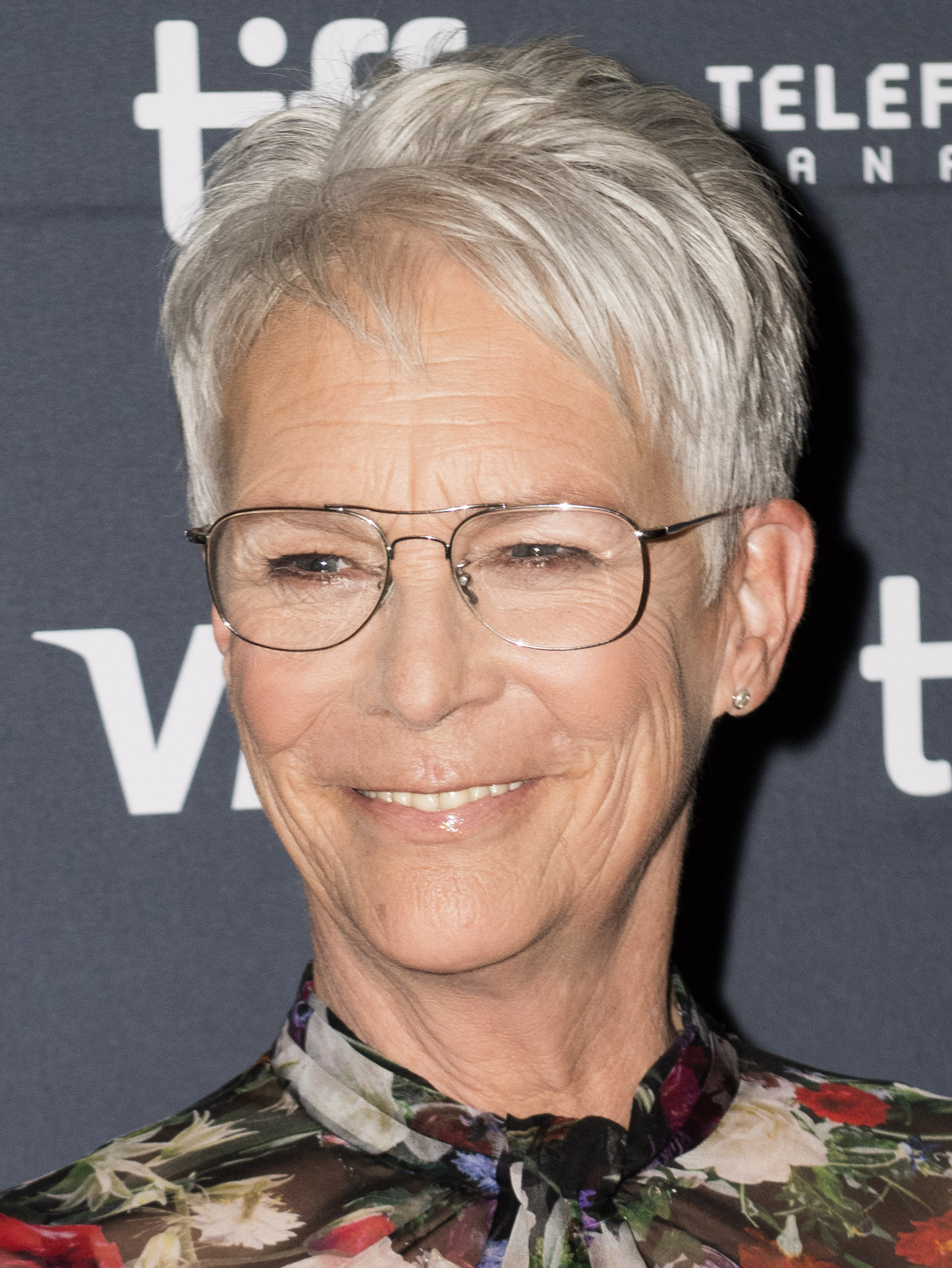
- Curtis in 2025
- Born: November 22, 1958 (age 68); Santa Monica, California, U.S.
- Occupations: Actress; producer; author
- Years active: 1977–present
- Works: Full list
- Spouse: Christopher Haden-Guest, 5th Baron Haden-Guest (m. 1984)
- Children: 2
- Parents: Tony Curtis; Janet Leigh
- Relatives: Kelly Curtis (sister); Allegra Curtis (half-sister)
- Awards: Full list

Signature
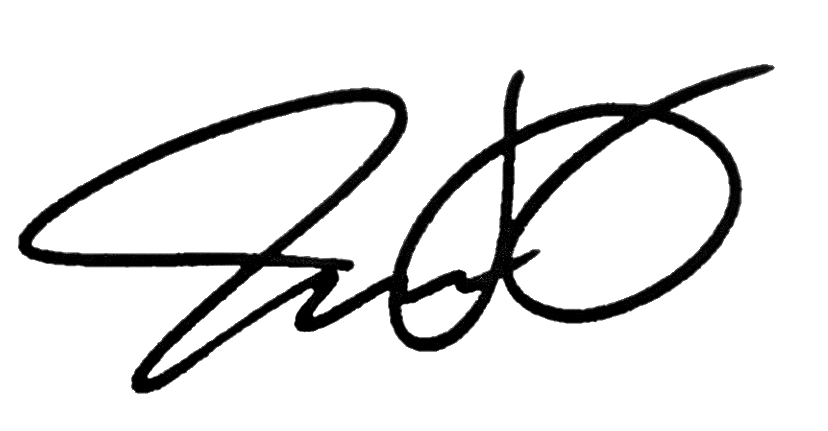

Jamie Lee Curtis (born November 22, 1958) is an American actress, producer, and children's author. Known for her performances in the horror and slasher genres, alongside multiple comedies, she is regarded as a "scream queen". As of 2023, her films have grossed over $2.5 billion at the box office. Curtis has received numerous accolades, including an Academy Award, a BAFTA Award, a Primetime Emmy Award, two Golden Globes, and two Actor Awards, as well as a nomination for a Grammy Award.

The youngest daughter of actors Tony Curtis and Janet Leigh, Curtis made her screen debut in a 1977 episode of the television drama Quincy, M.E.. Her film debut came with the role of Laurie Strode in John Carpenter's horror Halloween (1978); the role proved to be Curtis's breakthrough and established her as a prominent scream queen. Her subsequent horror roles have included The Fog, Prom Night, and Terror Train (all 1980), as well as six sequels from the Halloween franchise, concluding with Halloween Ends (2022). She also gained brief recognition as a sex symbol following her role as a fitness instructor in Perfect (1985) and won her first Golden Globe for the sitcom Anything but Love (1989–1992).

Curtis's most successful roles outside of the horror genre have been in the comedies Trading Places (1983), True Lies (1994), and Everything Everywhere All at Once (2022); these respectively earned her BAFTA, Golden Globe, and Academy Award wins. Her other film credits include A Fish Called Wanda (1988), Blue Steel (1990), My Girl (1991), The Tailor of Panama (2001), Freaky Friday (2003), Christmas with the Kranks (2004), Knives Out (2019), The Last Showgirl (2024), and Freakier Friday (2025). Curtis earned her first Emmy nomination for the television film Nicholas' Gift (1998), and later won Outstanding Guest Actress in a Comedy Series for the FX series The Bear (2022–2026). She also acted in the satirical slasher series Scream Queens (2015–2016). Curtis has written multiple children's books that have made The New York Times's best-seller list.

== Early life ==
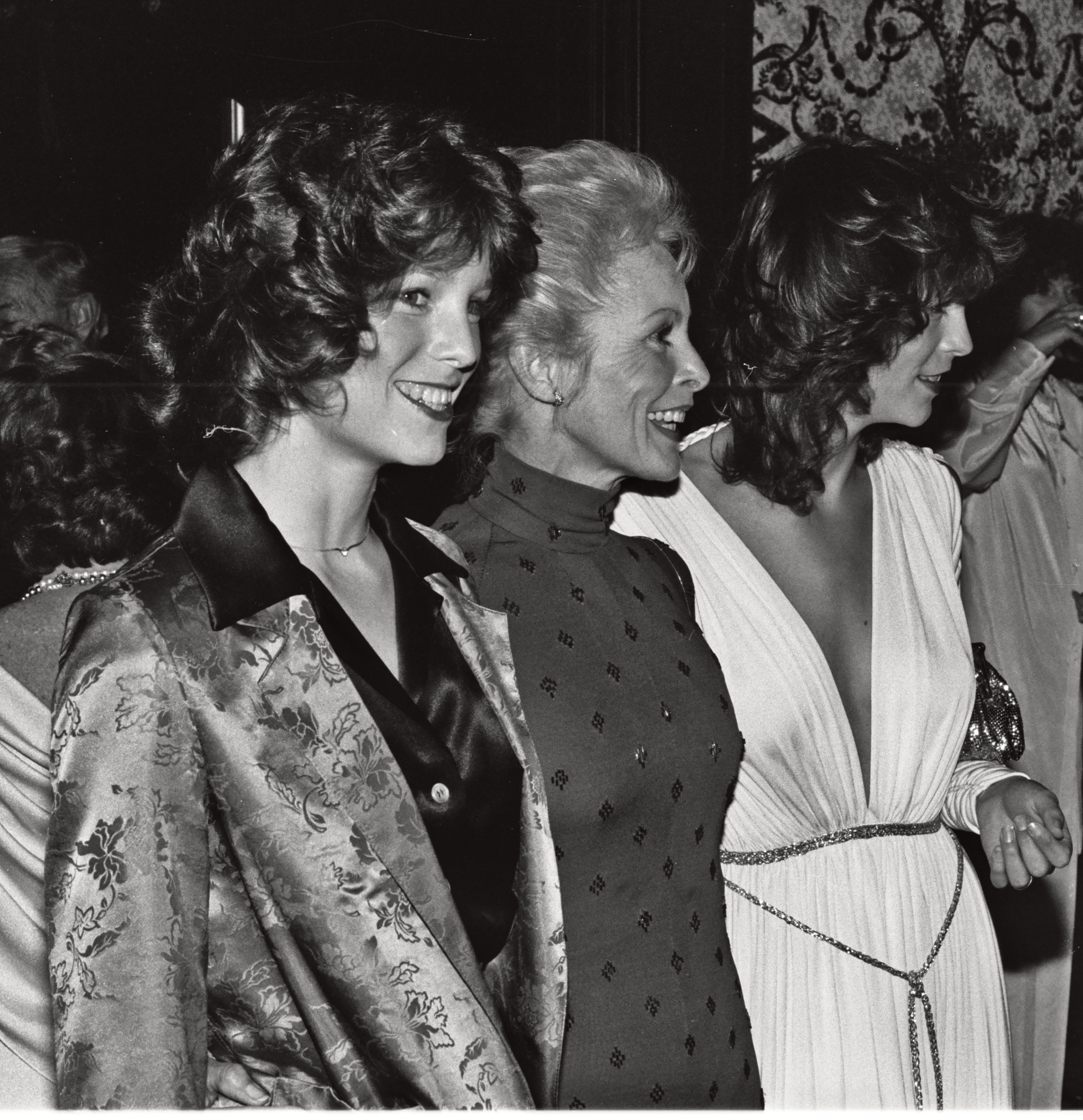
Curtis (right) with her mother Janet Leigh (middle) and sister Kelly Curtis (left) in 1979

Jamie Lee Curtis was born on November 22, 1958, in Santa Monica, California, to actors Tony Curtis and Janet Leigh. Her father was Jewish, a son of emigrants from Mátészalka, Hungary. Her mother was of Danish, German, and Scotch-Irish descent. She had an older sister, actress Kelly Curtis (1956-2026), and four half-siblings from her father's later marriages including actress Allegra Curtis.

Curtis's parents divorced in 1962. She has stated that, after the divorce, her father was "not around" and that he was "not interested in being a father". After her father's death, she learned that she and her siblings had all been cut out of his will. Her mother married stockbroker Robert Brandt, who helped raise her. Curtis attended the elite Harvard-Westlake School and Beverly Hills High School in Los Angeles, and graduated in 1976 from Choate Rosemary Hall in Wallingford, Connecticut. Returning to California in 1976, she studied law at her mother's alma mater—University of the Pacific in Stockton, California—but dropped out after one semester to pursue an acting career.

== Career ==
=== 1970s: Early television roles and breakthrough with Halloween ===
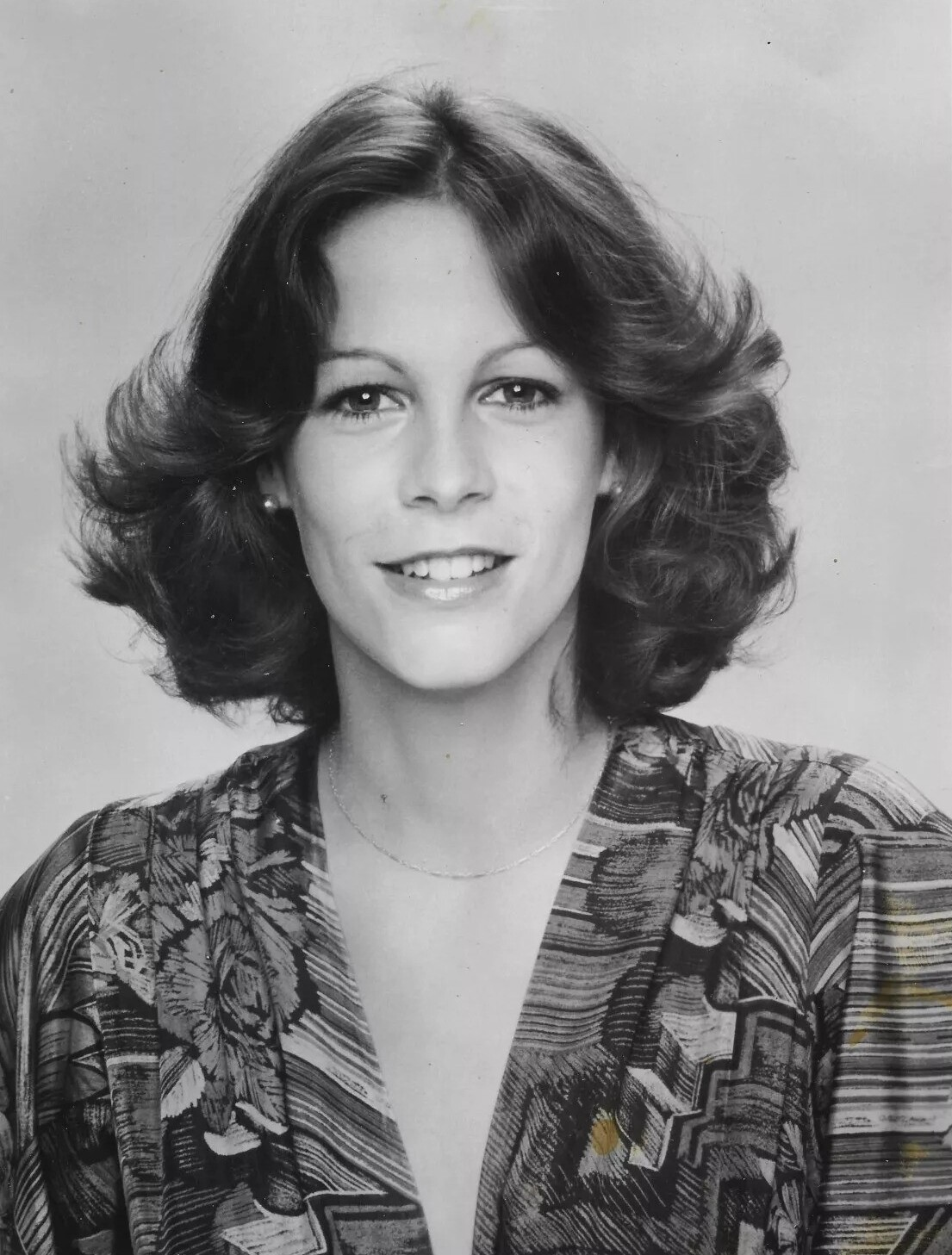
Curtis in a publicity photo, 1977

Curtis made her television debut in a 1977 episode of the drama series Quincy, M.E.. She went on to guest star on several series, including The Hardy Boys/Nancy Drew Mysteries, Columbo, Charlie's Angels, The Love Boat, and Buck Rogers in the 25th Century. She appeared as Nurse Lt. Barbara Duran in the short-lived comedy series Operation Petticoat (1977–1978), based on the 1959 film that starred her father, Tony Curtis. Curtis was also a game show panelist on several episodes of Match Game.

Her film debut occurred in John Carpenter's 1978 horror film Halloween, in which she played the role of Laurie Strode. The producer, Debra Hill, specifically cast Curtis because her mother, Janet Leigh, had been known as a horror icon due to her Oscar-nominated performance in Psycho. The film was a major success and was considered the highest-grossing independent film of its time, earning accolades as a classic horror film.

=== 1980s: Scream queen and established actress ===
After the major critical and commercial success of Halloween, Curtis was cast in several horror films, garnering her a reputation as a scream queen. Her next film following Halloween was The Fog, which also was directed by Carpenter and produced by Hill. The film opened in February 1980 to mixed reviews but strong box office, starting Curtis as a horror film starlet. In the years since its release, the film has achieved critical reappraisal and developed a cult following. Her next film, Prom Night, was a low-budget Canadian slasher film released in July 1980. The film, for which she earned a Genie Award nomination for Best Performance by a Foreign Actress, was similar in style to Halloween, yet received negative reviews that marked it as a disposable entry in the then-popular slasher genre. That year, Curtis also starred in Terror Train, which opened in October and met with negative reviews akin to Prom Night. Both films performed moderately well at the box office. Curtis's roles in the latter two films served a similar function to that of Strode—the main character whose friends are murdered and is practically the only protagonist to survive. Film critic Roger Ebert, who gave negative reviews to all three of Curtis's 1980 films, said that Curtis "is to the current horror film glut what Christopher Lee was to the last one—or Boris Karloff was in the 1930s."

In 1981, she appeared alongside Stacy Keach in the Australian thriller film Roadgames, directed by Carpenter's friend Richard Franklin; her importation, which was requested by the film's American distributor AVCO Embassy Pictures, was contested by the Sydney branch of Actors Equity. Although the film was a box office bomb in Australia and Franklin later regretted not increasing the size of Curtis's role, it has achieved a cult following and was championed by Quentin Tarantino. That same year, Curtis reprised her role of Laurie Strode in Halloween II. She starred in the television films Death of a Centerfold: The Dorothy Stratten Story, playing the eponymous doomed Playmate, and She's in the Army Now.

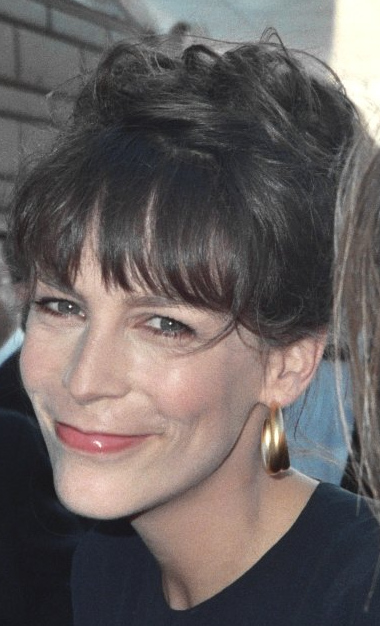
Curtis at the 1989 Primetime Emmy Awards

Her role as a kindhearted prostitute in 1983's Trading Places helped Curtis shed her horror queen image; the film was a great critical and commercial success and garnered Curtis a BAFTA Award for Best Actress in a Supporting Role. She had previously worked with director John Landis on the documentary Coming Soon. The studio originally objected to Curtis's casting, as she was primarily associated with horror films: "The casting people all thought [Landis] was crazy, and he single-handedly changed the course of my life by giving me that part", Curtis later stated. The following year, Curtis appeared in the romantic drama film Love Letters and the comedy-drama Grandview, U.S.A..

In 1985, Curtis was cast opposite John Travolta as a workout instructor in the film Perfect. While her role earned her a reputation as a sex symbol, the film was a critical and commercial flop. It has since earned a cult following, and in a 1994 interview with Rolling Stone magazine, Quentin Tarantino called the movie "greatly underappreciated." That same year, Curtis starred as Annie Oakley in an episode of Shelley Duvall's Tall Tales & Legends. In 1986, she starred alongside Bette Davis in the HBO film As Summers Die. She then starred in the 1988 comedy film A Fish Called Wanda, which achieved cult status while showcasing her as a comedic actress. For her performance, she was nominated for the BAFTA Award for Best Actress in a Leading Role and the Golden Globe Award for Best Actress – Motion Picture Comedy or Musical. That same year, Curtis starred in the film Dominick and Eugene alongside Tom Hulce and Ray Liotta.

Her first starring role on television came opposite Richard Lewis in the situation comedy series Anything but Love, which ran for four seasons from 1989 through 1992. For her performance as Hannah Miller, she received the Golden Globe Award for Best Actress – Television Series Musical or Comedy and the People's Choice Award for Favorite Actress in a New TV Series.

=== 1990s: Continued box-office successes ===
Curtis received positive reviews for her performance in the action thriller Blue Steel (1990), which was directed by Kathryn Bigelow. The following year, she appeared in My Girl, opposite her Trading Places co-star Dan Aykroyd. The film was a great commercial success and was followed by a sequel, My Girl 2, in 1994. In 1992, Curtis starred alongside Mel Gibson in the romantic fantasy film Forever Young. The following year, she appeared in the psychological thriller Mother's Boys.

Curtis received a Golden Globe Award for her work in the 1994 action-comedy film True Lies, directed by James Cameron. The film was a critical and commercial success, becoming the 3rd highest-grossing film of 1994. Her performance also earned Curtis her first Screen Actors Guild Award nomination. She earned another Golden Globe Award nomination for her work in TNT's adaptation of the Wendy Wasserstein play The Heidi Chronicles (1995). In 1996, Curtis starred in the family comedy film House Arrest and appeared in an episode of the sitcom The Drew Carey Show.

Curtis appeared in Fierce Creatures in 1997, alongside her three A Fish Called Wanda costars: John Cleese, Kevin Kline, and Michael Palin. While the film was a modest commercial success, grossing $40 million worldwide against a $25 million budget, 53% of critics gave it positive reviews on Rotten Tomatoes. That same year, Curtis was inducted into the Fangoria Hall of Fame.

In 1998, she starred in the CBS television film Nicholas' Gift, for which she received a Primetime Emmy Award nomination, and reprised her role of Laurie Strode for the third time in Halloween H20: 20 Years Later. That same year, Curtis received a star on the Hollywood Walk of Fame. In 1999, she starred in the science fiction horror film Virus, which was a critical and commercial flop. Curtis has since stated that she regrets starring in the film.

=== 2000s: Decrease in workload and hiatus ===
In 2000, Curtis was honored with the Hasty Pudding Woman of the Year award and appeared in the crime comedy film Drowning Mona, starring Danny DeVito and Bette Midler. The following year, she starred as Geoffrey Rush's wife in the spy-triller film The Tailor of Panama and appeared in Billy Bob Thornton's Daddy and Them. Also in 2001, she voiced Queen Camilla in the animated Christmas film Rudolph the Red-Nosed Reindeer and the Island of Misfit Toys. She appeared in Halloween: Resurrection in 2002.

In 2003, Curtis was cast opposite Lindsay Lohan in the Disney comedy film Freaky Friday. The film was shot at Palisades High School in Pacific Palisades, California, near where Curtis and Guest lived with their children. Curtis received praise for her performance; A. O. Scott from The New York Times contended that she "does some of her best work ever", while Entertainment Weekly called her performance "glorious". Her performance earned her another nomination for a Golden Globe Award for Best Actress – Motion Picture Comedy or Musical. She also received a Grammy Award nomination that same year for Best Spoken Word Album for Children for the audiobook The Jamie Lee Curtis Audio Collection.

In 2004, she starred in the Christmas comedy film Christmas with the Kranks, which was critically derided but a box office success. The following year, she appeared as herself along with her True Lies co-star Arnold Schwarzenegger in the comedy film The Kid & I and hosted the CBS program A Home for the Holidays. In October 2006, Curtis told Access Hollywood that she had closed the book on her acting career to focus on her family. She briefly returned to acting after being cast in June 2007 in Disney's live-action-animated film Beverly Hills Chihuahua, starring opposite Piper Perabo as one of three live-action characters in the film.

=== 2010s: Return and film resurgence ===
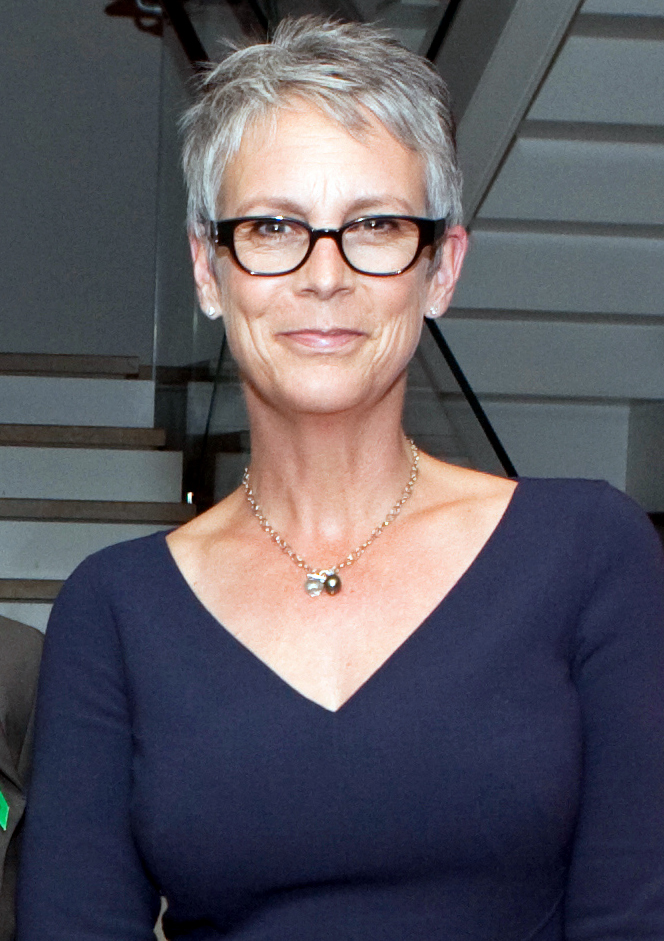
Curtis in 2011

Curtis began the 2010s with the comedy film You Again, opposite Kristen Bell and Sigourney Weaver. Curtis had voice roles in the animated films The Little Engine That Could (2011) and the English language version of From Up on Poppy Hill (2013).

In 2012, she appeared in five episodes of the military drama series NCIS, playing the role of Dr. Samantha Ryan, a potential romantic interest of Special Agent Gibbs (Mark Harmon). During an interview, she stated that if they could develop a storyline, she would be interested to return to the series, but this never occurred. The series reunited Curtis with Harmon, after he played her character's fiancé and later husband in the 2003 remake of Freaky Friday. This was followed by supporting roles in the neo-noir mystery film Veronica Mars (2014) and the biographical drama film Spare Parts (2015). In 2016, IndieWire named her one of the best actors never to have received an Academy Award nomination (Curtis received her first Academy Award nomination in 2023).

From 2012 to 2018, Curtis had a recurring role as Joan Day, the mother of Zooey Deschanel's character, in the sitcom New Girl. From 2015 to 2016, Curtis had a lead role as Cathy Munsch on the Fox satirical horror comedy series Scream Queens, which aired for two seasons. Curtis filmed an intricate homage to her mother's classic shower scene in Psycho in a season one episode. For her performance in the first season, Curtis was nominated for the Golden Globe Award for Best Actress – Television Series Musical or Comedy and the People's Choice Award for Favorite Actress in a New TV Series. In 2017, Curtis was mentioned by Eminem in Big Sean's song No Favors.

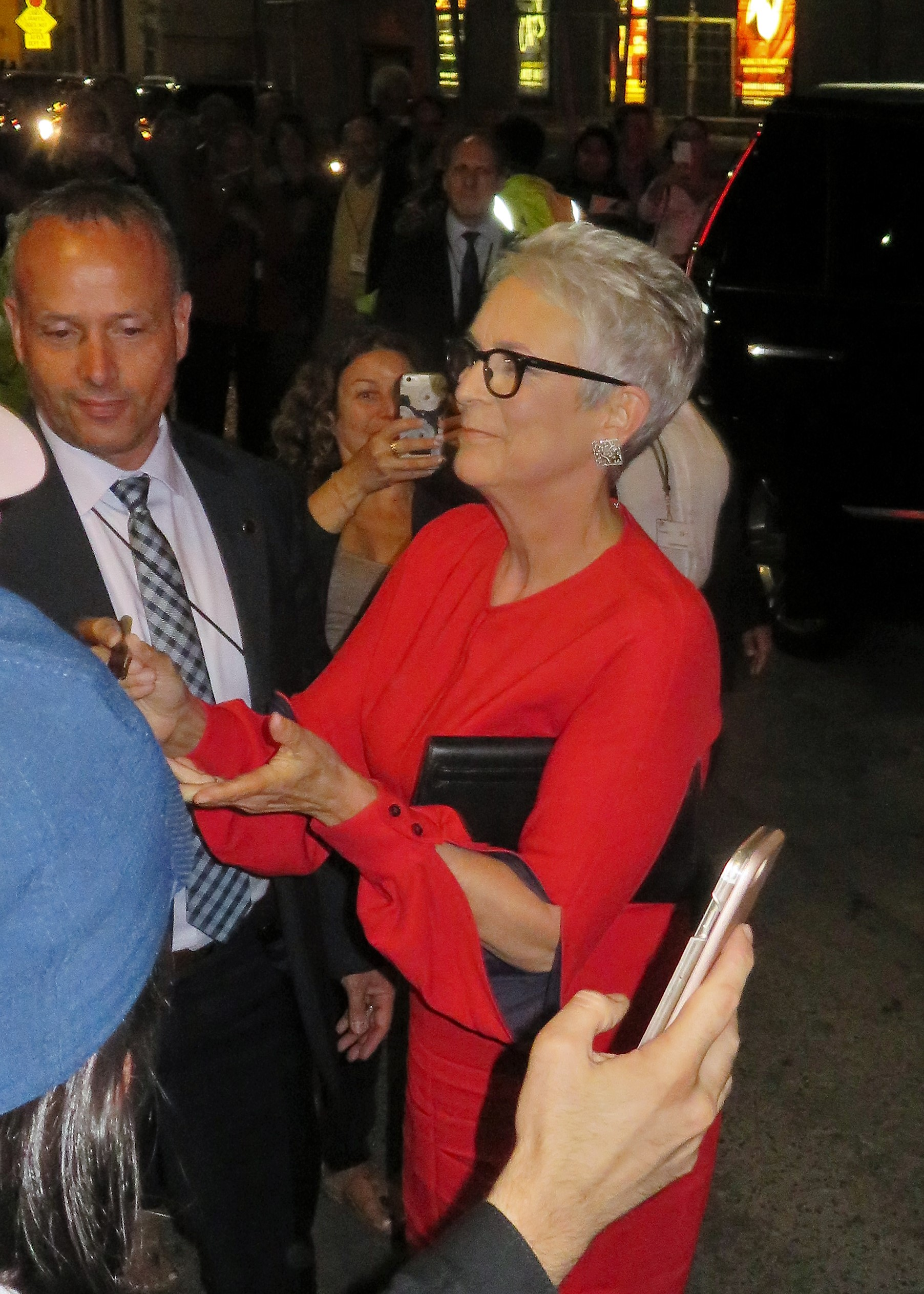
Curtis at the 2019 Toronto International Film Festival

Curtis returned to leading roles with her reprisal of Laurie Strode in the horror sequel film Halloween (2018). The film debuted to $76.2 million, marking the second-best opening weekend of October and the highest opening weekend of the Halloween franchise; and became the biggest domestic grosser in the franchise with its opening weekend alone. Its opening performance was the best-ever for a film starring a lead actress over 55 years old. Also in 2018, she had a role in the drama film An Acceptable Loss. Her performance earned some positive critical notice; Chicago Sun-Times critic Richard Roeper stated that Curtis "creates a monster so terrifying she'd have Michael Myers turning tail and running away."

In 2019, Curtis appeared as Linda Drysdale-Thrombrey, the eldest daughter of novelist Harlan Thrombey (played by Christopher Plummer) in Rian Johnson's mystery film Knives Out, which earned positive reviews and over $300 million at the global box office. The film was chosen by the American Film Institute, the National Board of Review, and Time magazine as one of the top ten films of 2019 in each respective list.

=== 2020s: Awards success and beyond ===
In September 2021, she was honored with the Golden Lion at the Venice Film Festival for her lifetime achievements. Also in 2021, Curtis received the Golden Lion for Lifetime Achievement during the 78th Venice International Film Festival and said, "I feel so alive, like I'm this 14-year-old person just beginning their life. That's how I wake up every day with that sort of joy and purpose. I'm just beginning my work." Curtis again reprised her role as Laurie Strode in the horror sequels Halloween Kills, which was released in October 2021, and in Halloween Ends, which was released in October 2022. Her performance in each film earned her People's Choice Award nominations for Drama Movie Star. Halloween Ends marked Curtis's final time portraying Laurie Strode. She also was honored with a handprint ceremony at Grauman's Chinese Theater on October 12, 2022. Curtis's close friends Melanie Griffith and Arnold Schwarzenegger both honored her with speeches at the ceremony.

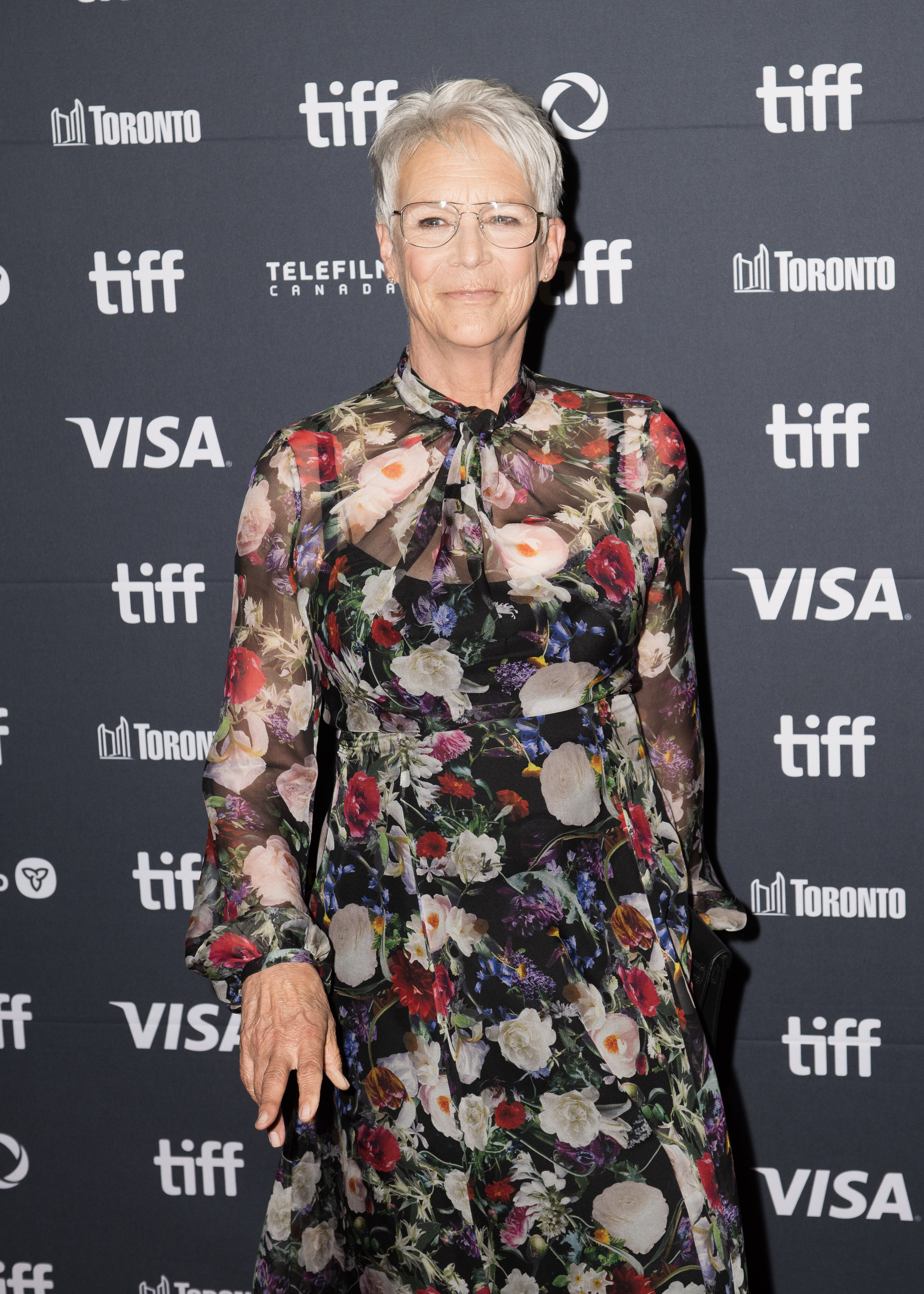
Curtis at the 2025 Toronto International Film Festival

She appeared as persnickety Internal Revenue Service (IRS) inspector Deirdre Beaubeirdre in the comedy-drama action film Everything Everywhere All at Once (2022), which earned her nominations for an Academy Award, BAFTA, Critics' Choice, Golden Globe, and Screen Actors Guild Award for Best Supporting Actress, in addition to a nomination for an Independent Spirit Award for Best Supporting Performance. It was Curtis's first Oscar nomination. She ultimately won the Academy Award and SAG Award, marking her first time winning both, as well as being part of the cast's Best Ensemble win at the SAG Awards.

In 2023, Curtis guest starred in the second season of the Hulu comedy-drama series The Bear as alcoholic family matriarch Donna Berzatto, having hoped to become involved with the series after watching the first season. She received widespread critical acclaim and won the Primetime Emmy Award for Outstanding Guest Actress in a Comedy Series at the 76th Primetime Emmy Awards. She starred as Madame Leota in Disney's Haunted Mansion, which was released on July 28, 2023, to mixed reviews from critics.

In 2024, Curtis was named a Disney Legend by The Walt Disney Company. She portrayed Dr. Patricia Tannis in the film Borderlands, which adapts the video game series of the same name. It was released on August 9, 2024, to negative reviews from critics and bombed at the box office. She also appeared in Gia Coppola's film The Last Showgirl, which premiered at TIFF on September 6, 2024, and garnered her a fourth SAG Awards nomination for Outstanding Performance by a Female Actor in a Supporting Role and a fourth BAFTA Awards nomination for Best Actress in a Supporting Role.

Curtis co-produced and reprised her role as Tess Coleman in a sequel to Freaky Friday alongside Lindsay Lohan, titled Freakier Friday. The movie theatrically released on August 8, 2025. She starred in James L. Brooks's 2025 film Ella McCay and was credited as a producer for Paul Greengrass's 2025 film The Lost Bus.

== Other ventures ==
=== Activism ===
Beginning in 1990, Curtis and her father, Tony, took a renewed interest in their family's Hungarian Jewish heritage, and helped finance the rebuilding of the "Great Synagogue" in Budapest, Hungary. The largest synagogue in Europe, it was originally built in 1859 and suffered damage during World War II. Curtis later helped to refurbish the synagogue in Mátészalka, where her grandparents worshipped. She attended the opening of the Tony Curtis Memorial Museum and Cafe, which is also located in Mátészalka.

Curtis was guest of honor at the 11th annual gala and fundraiser in 2003 for Women in Recovery, a Venice, California-based non-profit organization offering a live-in, twelve-step program of rehabilitation for women in need. Past honorees of this organization include Sir Anthony Hopkins and Dame Angela Lansbury. Curtis is also involved in the work of the Children Affected by AIDS Foundation, serving as the annual host for the organization's "Dream Halloween" event in Los Angeles, launched every year in October.

Curtis plays a leadership role for Children's Hospital Los Angeles and supported the 2011 opening of a new inpatient facility for the organization. During the COVID-19 pandemic, she started the "My Hand in Yours" organization with the message "you are not alone" to raise money for the hospital and for people to be able to offer gifts and objects of comfort to people in times of crisis, with all proceeds from every item in the store being sent to help in the care and treatment of critically ill and injured children.

In October 2023, The Advocate honored Curtis with the Advocate of the Year award as a part of the Out100 celebration. Curtis, who is mother to a transgender daughter, then gave a speech condemning anti-LGBTQ+ lawmakers and their supporters, stating: "Freedom is the goal." In January 2025, she donated $1 million to the Los Angeles wildfires relief efforts.

Curtis is a leading activist and advocate against the negative effects of cosmetic surgery and Hollywood standards on young women. In 2025, she starred in a campaign on this issue, wearing red plastic lips to caricature the kind of alteration that many women have opted for. She was interviewed about this for The Guardian.

=== Political views ===
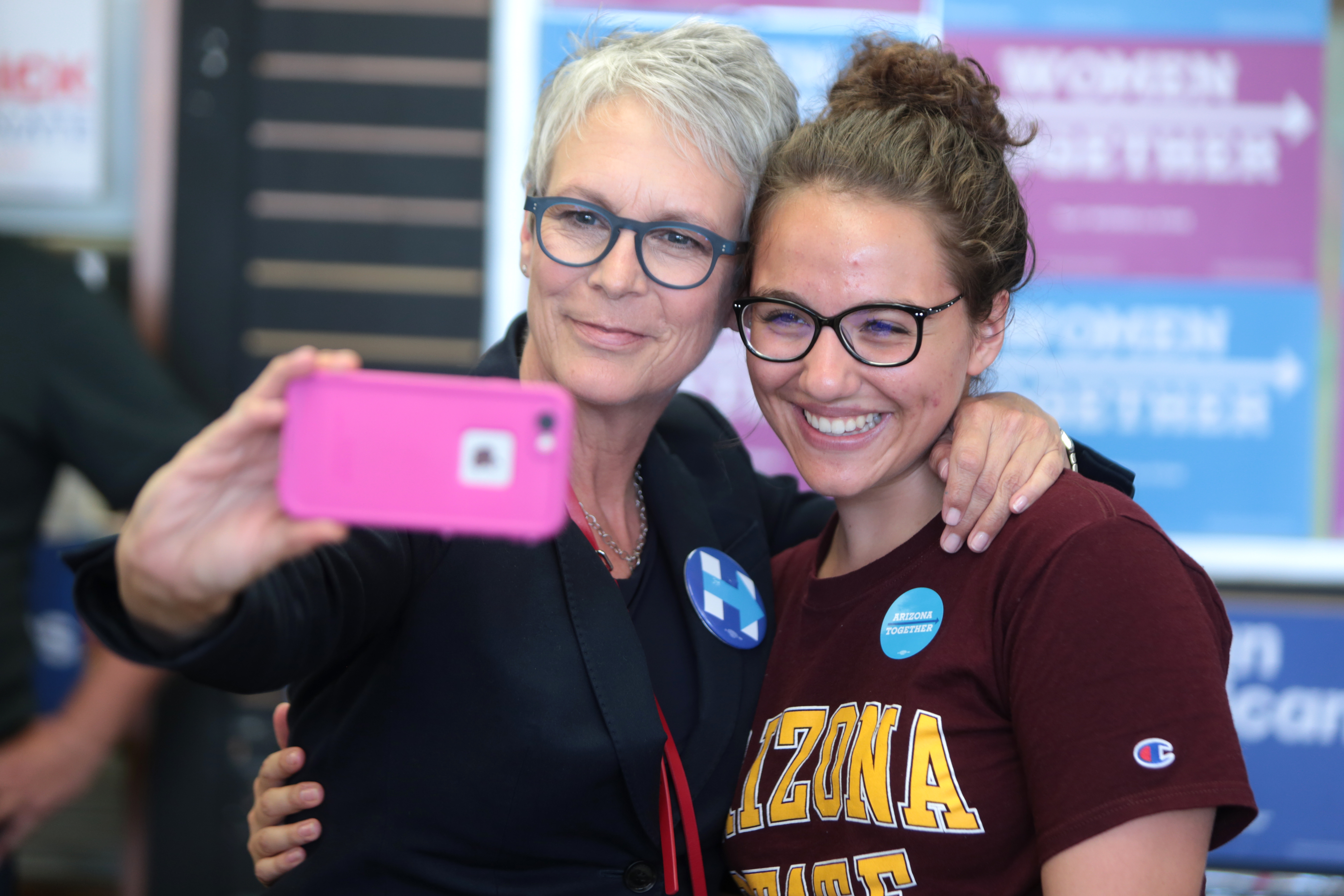
Curtis at an event to support Democratic presidential nominee Hillary Clinton in 2016

During California's 2008 general election, Curtis appeared in television advertisements for the Children's Hospital Bond Act.

In March 2012, Curtis was featured with Martin Sheen and Brad Pitt in a performance of Dustin Lance Black's play 8—a staged reenactment of the federal trial that overturned California's Prop 8 ban on same-sex marriage—as Sandy Stier. The production was held at the Wilshire Ebell Theatre and broadcast on YouTube to raise money for the American Foundation for Equal Rights. In June 2016, the Human Rights Campaign released a video in tribute to the victims of the Orlando nightclub shooting; in the video, Curtis and others told the stories of the people killed there.

Curtis endorsed Hillary Clinton in the 2016 presidential election, and was a vocal critic of President Donald Trump during his term in office. Curtis showed support for Marianne Williamson in the primaries and endorsed Kamala Harris in the 2024 presidential election as well as Adam Schiff for the 2024 Senate race in California.

In October 2023, she expressed support for Israel during the Gaza war, uploading a photo to Instagram of Palestinian children mistakenly identified as Israeli, with the caption reading "Terror from the Skies", followed by an emoji of the Israeli flag. After social media users noted the children were actually Palestinian, Curtis removed the post, leading to accusations of hypocrisy. In a statement to HuffPost regarding the backlash, Curtis said: "I took down the post when I realized my error. The other post is a Guy Oseary repost. It's an awful situation for all the innocent people in the line of fire." In the following month, Curtis called for a ceasefire while showing support for the youth victims trapped among the conflict.

=== Writing ===
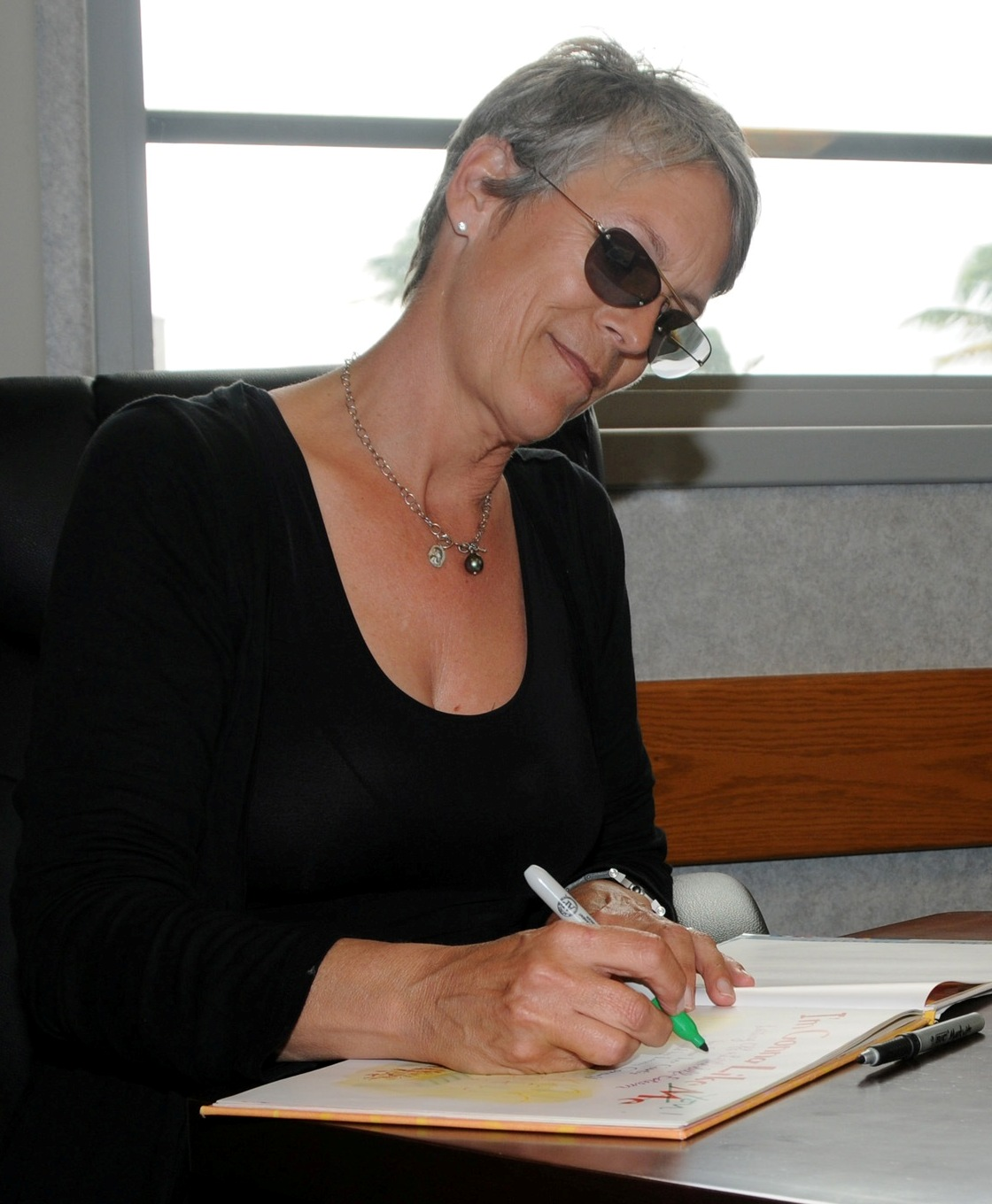
Curtis autographing a copy of her children's book in 2010

Working with illustrator Laura Cornell, Curtis has written a number of children's books, all published by HarperCollins Children's Books. Curtis was also a blogger for The Huffington Post online newspaper from 2011 to 2017.

In February 2022, Curtis was announced to have co-written a graphic novel, Mother Nature, which is based on an upcoming eco-horror film made by Comet Pictures and Blumhouse Productions that will be written and directed by Curtis. The graphic novel was published in July 2023 by Titan Comics, written by Curtis and filmmaker Russell Goldman, and illustrated by Karl Stevens.

=== Invention ===
In 1987, Curtis filed a U.S. patent application that subsequently issued as Patent No. 4,753,647. This is a modification of a diaper with a moisture-proof pocket containing wipes that can be taken out and used with one hand. Curtis refused to allow her invention to be marketed until companies started selling biodegradable diapers. The full statutory term of this patent expired February 20, 2007, and it is now in the public domain. She filed a second U.S. patent application related to disposable diapers in 2016, which was issued as U.S. Patent 9,827,151 on November 28, 2017, and will expire on September 7, 2036.

=== Podcasting ===
On her website, Curtis tells her young readers that she "moonlights as an actor, photographer, and closet organizer". Curtis launched the podcast series Letters from Camp on Audible in 2020 and Good Friend with Jamie Lee Curtis for iHeartRadio in 2021.

== Personal life ==
Curtis dated Robert Carradine in the 1970s after meeting him during a taping of The Dinah Shore Show and referred to him as her "first crush." She also briefly dated British rock singer Adam Ant. Curtis married British-American actor, comedian, screenwriter, and director Christopher Guest on December 18, 1984. She saw a picture of him from his film This Is Spinal Tap (1984) in Rolling Stone and told her friend Debra Hill, "Oh, I'm going to marry that guy." She married him five months later. They have two adopted daughters. Curtis is actor Jake Gyllenhaal's godmother. In December 2025, Curtis's older daughter, Annie, gave birth to a son, Curtis and Guest's first grandchild.

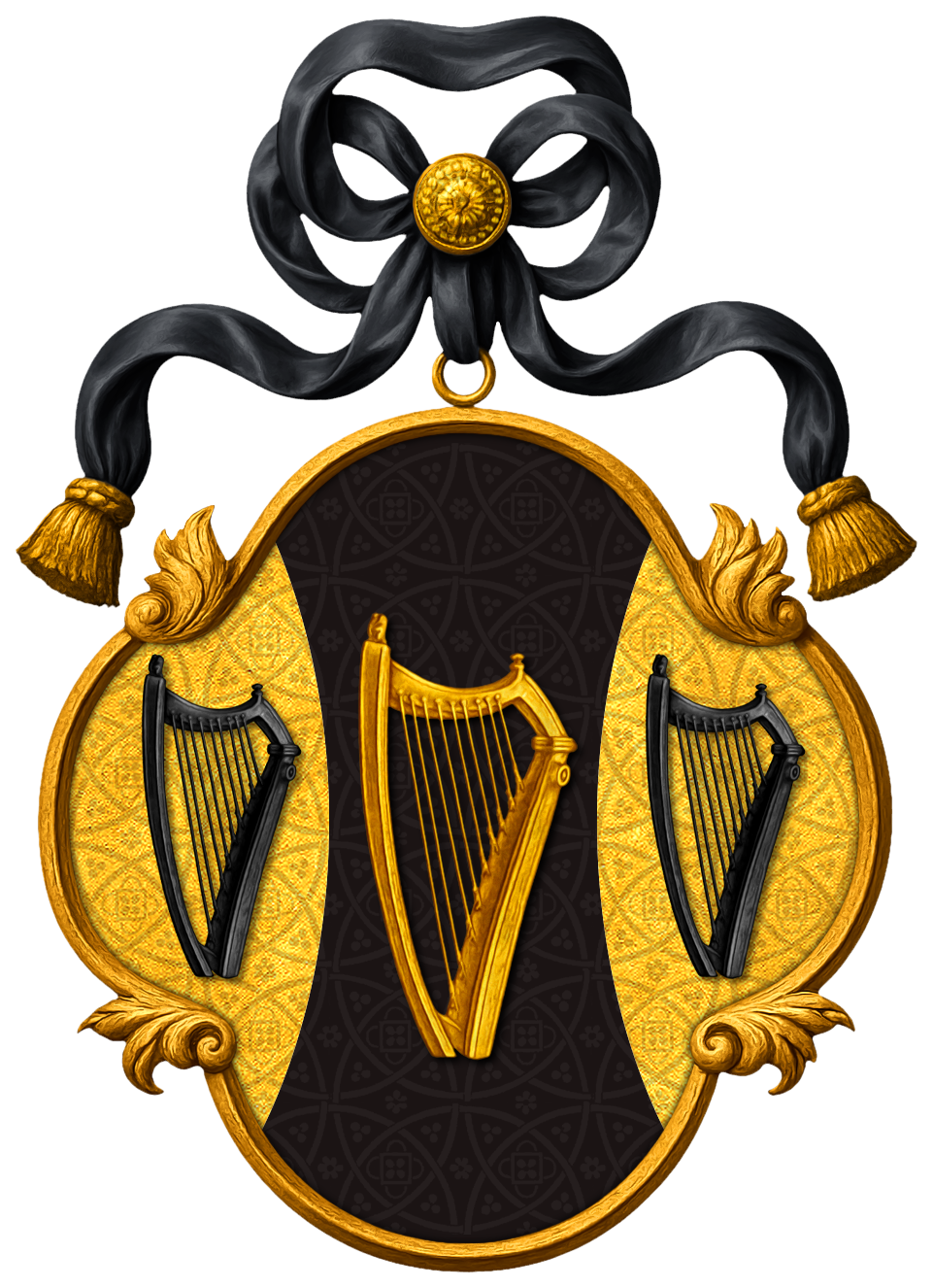
Arms of Curtis as Baroness Haden-Guest

On April 8, 1996, her husband Guest inherited the title Baron Haden-Guest when his father died. As the wife of a hereditary peer, Curtis is a baroness, and thus entitled to the style of The Right Honourable The Lady Haden-Guest. Curtis does not use this title, saying, "it has nothing to do with me".

She is close friends with actress Sigourney Weaver. In a 2015 interview, she said that she has never watched Weaver's film Alien (1979) in its entirety because she was too scared by it.

Curtis is a recovering alcoholic, and was once addicted to painkillers that she began using after a cosmetic surgical procedure. She became sober from opiates in 1999 after reading and relating to Tom Chiarella's account of addiction, and has called her own recovery the greatest achievement of her life. She is a fan of the video game World of Warcraft and the manga One Piece, and has worn disguises that allowed her to attend Comic-Con, EVO, and BlizzCon incognito.

== Acting credits and awards ==
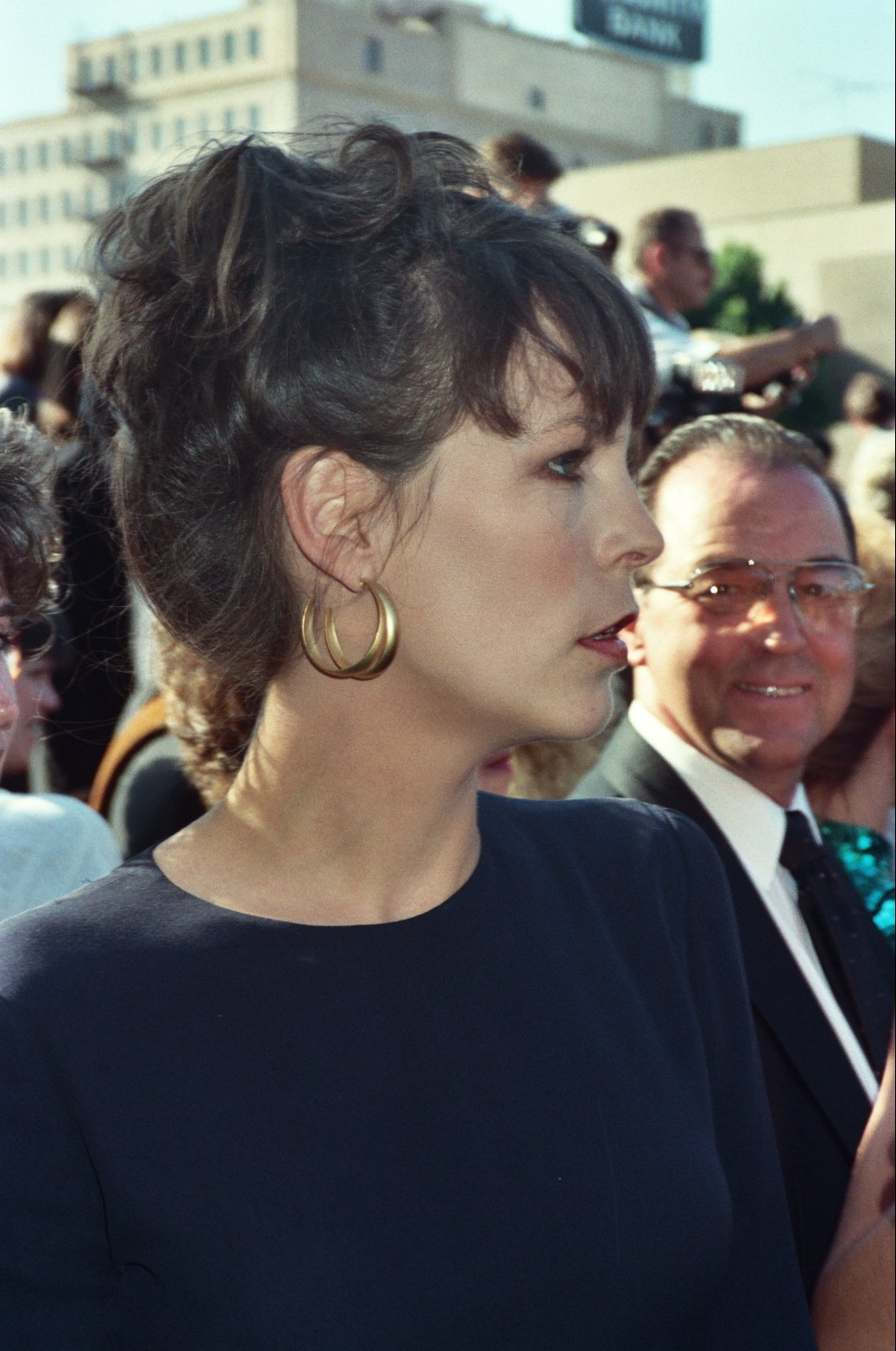
Curtis at the 1989 Primetime Emmy Awards

Curtis has received numerous accolades, including an Academy Award, a BAFTA Award (from four nominations), an Emmy Award (from three nominations), two Golden Globe Awards (from eight nominations), and two Screen Actors Guild Awards (from four nominations). She has also been nominated for a Grammy Award and an Independent Spirit Award. She received the Maltin Modern Master Award from the Santa Barbara International Film Festival in 2023.

Her most positively reviewed films, according to the review-aggregation website Rotten Tomatoes, include:

- Halloween (1978)
- The Fog (1980)
- Roadgames (1981)
- Trading Places (1983)
- Dominick and Eugene (1988)
- A Fish Called Wanda (1988)
- Blue Steel (1990)
- True Lies (1994)
- The Tailor of Panama (2001)
- Daddy and Them (2001)
- Freaky Friday (2003)
- Veronica Mars (2014)
- Halloween (2018)
- Knives Out (2019)
- Everything Everywhere All at Once (2022)
- The Last Showgirl (2024)
- Freakier Friday (2025)

== Bibliography ==
- When I Was Little: A Four-Year Old's Memoir of Her Youth, 1993.
- Tell Me Again About The Night I was Born, 1996.
- Today I Feel Silly, and Other Moods That Make My Day, 1998; listed on the New York Times best-seller list for 10 weeks.
- Where Do Balloons Go?: An Uplifting Mystery, 2000.
- I'm Gonna Like Me: Letting Off a Little Self-Esteem, 2002.
- It's Hard to Be Five: Learning How to Work My Control Panel, 2004.
- Is There Really a Human Race?, 2006.
- Big Words for Little People, ISBN 978-0-06-112759-5, 2008.
- My Friend Jay, 2009, edition of one, presented to Jay Leno
- My Mommy Hung the Moon: A Love Story, 2010.
- My Brave Year of Firsts, 2016.
- This Is Me: A Story of Who We Are and Where We Came From, 2016.
- Me, Myselfie & I: A Cautionary Tale, 2018.

== See also ==
- List of actors with Academy Award nominations
- List of oldest and youngest Academy Award winners and nominees
- List of Primetime Emmy Award winners
- List of Golden Globe winners
