= Coming Soon (1982 film) =

- Directed by: John Landis
- Written by: Mick Garris; John Landis
- Produced by: Mick Garris; Robert B. Idels; John Landis
- Narrated by: Jamie Lee Curtis
- Cinematography: Stephen M. Katz
- Edited by: Geoff Browne
- Production companies: Nice Guy Productions; Universal Pictures
- Distributed by: MCA Home Video
- Release date: 1982
- Running time: 55 minutes
- Country: United States
- Language: English

Coming Soon is a 1982 American direct-to-video documentary film directed by John Landis for Universal Pictures. The film is narrated by Jamie Lee Curtis with a script by Mick Garris.

== Featured clips ==
- The Hunchback of Notre Dame (1923)
- The Phantom of the Opera (1925)
- Frankenstein (1931)
- Dracula (1931)
- The Mummy (1932)
- The Bride of Frankenstein (1935)
- The Mummy's Hand (1940)
- The Wolf Man (1941)
- Dr. Jekyll and Mr. Hyde (1941)
- Invisible Agent (1942)
- The Mummy's Tomb (1942)
- Captive Wild Woman (1943)
- Son of Dracula (1943)
- Weird Woman (1944)
- The Mummy's Ghost (1944)
- The Mummy's Curse (1944)
- House of Frankenstein (1944)
- House of Dracula (1945)
- Abbott and Costello Meet Frankenstein (1948)
- Abbott and Costello Meet Dr. Jekyll and Mr. Hyde (1953)
- Creature from the Black Lagoon (1954)
- Revenge of the Creature (1955)
- Tarantula (1955)
- This Island Earth (1955)
- Curucu, Beast of the Amazon (1956)
- The Mole People (1956)
- The Creature Walks Among Us (1956)
- The Deadly Mantis (1957)
- The Incredible Shrinking Man (1957)
- Psycho (1960)
- Brides of Dracula (1960)
- King Kong vs. Godzilla (1962)
- The Birds (1963)
- The Night Walker (1964)

== Production and release ==
John Landis used trailers of old Universal horror and thriller films to create his own contribution to his favorite film genres. Jamie Lee Curtis' scenes were filmed at Dracula's Castle, European Street and the Psycho House on the backlot of Universal Studios in Universal City, California. It had a limited theatrical release before going to video.

== See also ==
Two other compilation documentary films similar in content:

- Trailer War
- It Came from Hollywood
