= The Heidi Chronicles (film) =

- Genre: Drama
- Based on: The Heidi Chronicles by Wendy Wasserstein
- Written by: Wendy Wasserstein
- Directed by: Paul Bogart
- Starring: Jamie Lee Curtis; Tom Hulce; Peter Friedman; Kim Cattrall
- Music by: David Shire
- Country of origin: United States
- Original language: English

Production
- Executive producer: Michael Brandman
- Producer: Leanne Moore
- Cinematography: Isidore Mankofsky
- Editor: Stan Cole
- Running time: 100 minutes
- Production company: Turner Pictures

Original release
- Network: TNT
- Release: October 15, 1995

The Heidi Chronicles is a 1995 made-for-television drama film by Wendy Wasserstein adapted from her play of the same name. The film premiered on TNT on October 15, 1995.

== Plot summary ==
The plot follows Heidi Holland from high school in the 1960s to her career as a successful art historian over 20 years later. The play's main themes deal with the changing role of women during this time period, describing both Heidi's ardent feminism during the 1970s and her eventual sense of betrayal during the 1980s.

== Cast ==
- Jamie Lee Curtis - Heidi Holland
- Tom Hulce - Peter Patrone
- Peter Friedman - Scoop Rosenbaum
- Kim Cattrall - Susan
- Eve Gordon - Lisa
- Julie White - Fran
- Shari Belafonte - April Lambert

== Awards and nominations ==
Year	Award	Category	Nominee(s)	Result	Ref.
1996	Artios Awards	Outstanding Achievement in Movie of the Week Casting	Juel Bestrop	Nominated	
1996	CableACE Awards	Supporting Actor in a Movie or Miniseries	Tom Hulce	Won	
1996	Golden Globe Awards	Best Miniseries or Motion Picture Made for Television		Nominated	
1996	Golden Globe Awards	Best Actress in a Miniseries or Motion Picture Made for Television	Jamie Lee Curtis	Nominated	
1996	Golden Globe Awards	Best Supporting Actor in a Series, Miniseries or Motion Picture Made for Television	Tom Hulce	Nominated	
1996	Primetime Emmy Awards	Outstanding Made for Television Movie	Michael Brandman, Leanne Moore, and Steven J. Brandman	Nominated	
1996	Primetime Emmy Awards	Outstanding Supporting Actor in a Miniseries or a Special	Tom Hulce	Won	
1996	Primetime Emmy Awards	Outstanding Directing for a Miniseries or a Special	Paul Bogart	Nominated	
1996	Primetime Emmy Awards	Outstanding Hairstyling for a Miniseries or a Special	Cynthia P. Romo	Nominated	
