= Nicholas' Gift =

1998 television film directed by Robert Markowitz

- DVD cover
- Written by: Christine Berardo
- Directed by: Robert Markowitz
- Starring: Jamie Lee Curtis; Alan Bates
- Composer: Carlo Siliotto
- Countries of origin: Italy; United States
- Original language: English

Production
- Executive producers: Lorenzo Minoli; Judd Parkin
- Producer: Russell Kagan
- Cinematography: Raffaele Mertes
- Editor: David Beatty
- Running time: 90 minutes
- Production companies: Lux Vide; Mediaset; Five Mile River Films

Original release
- Network: Canale 5 (Italy); CBS (United States)
- Release: April 21, 1998

Nicholas' Gift is a 1998 drama television film directed by Robert Markowitz and written by Christine Berardo. A co-production between Italy and the United States, it stars Jamie Lee Curtis and Alan Bates as an American couple who, after their son was mortally wounded during a family vacation in Italy, decide to donate the child's organs. The film received positive reviews and earned Curtis a Primetime Emmy Award nomination for her performance.

== Plot ==
Nicholas' Gift is a fact based drama about an American couple on vacation in Italy in 1994 with their two children who are attacked and shot by highway bandits. Shortly they discover that their son (named and based on Nicholas Green) is brain dead. The parents are then faced with the hard decision to donate the boy's organs which ultimately led to saving the lives of seven seriously ill Italian patients.

== Cast ==
- Jamie Lee Curtis as Maggie Green
- Alan Bates as Reg Green
- Gene Wexler as Nicholas Green
- Hallie Eisenberg as Eleanor Green
- Isabella Ferrari as Alessandra Grascia
- Anita Zagaria as Anna Bianchi
- Roberto Bisacco as Dr. Cipriano
- Ennio Coltorti as Dr. Santucci
- Nazzareno Costantini as Angelo Bianchi
- Manrico Gammarota as Paolo Bianchi
- Daniele Pio as Stefano Bianchi
- Carlo Cartier as Inspector Tramontana
- Jeremy Zimmermann as Richard Brown

== Reception ==
=== Critical response ===
Tom Jicha of the Sun-Sentinel was very positive about the film, describing it as "a wonderfully poignant movie that conveys an important message worthy of the widest possible circulation." In his review for The New York Times, Rick Lyman wrote that "a veteran cast pushing a commendable message is not quite enough to elevate Nicholas' Gift above being a by-the-numbers tear-jerker." The Deseret News praised the film for "superb performances by Jamie Lee Curtis and Alan Bates, tight steering by an award-winning director, an Italian crew schooled in feature film making, an intelligent script based on a riveting real-life story, and an almost religious commitment from everyone involved in the project to make a film worthy of its subjects."

=== Awards and nominations ===
Year	Award	Category	Recipient(s)	Result	Ref.
1998	50th Primetime Emmy Awards	Outstanding Lead Actress in a Miniseries or a Movie	Jamie Lee Curtis	Nominated	
1999	20th Youth in Film Awards	Best Family TV Movie / Pilot / Mini-Series	Nicholas' Gift	Nominated	
1999	50th Christopher Awards	Television Specials	Robert Markowitz; Christine Berardo; Russell Kagan; Lorenzo Minoli; Judd Parkin; Paolo Piria	Won	
