= Blue Steel (1990 film) =

1990 film by Kathryn Bigelow

- Theatrical release poster
- Directed by: Kathryn Bigelow
- Written by: Kathryn Bigelow; Eric Red
- Produced by: Edward R. Pressman; Oliver Stone
- Starring: Jamie Lee Curtis; Ron Silver; Clancy Brown; Elizabeth Peña; Louise Fletcher
- Cinematography: Amir Mokri
- Edited by: Lee Percy
- Music by: Brad Fiedel
- Production companies: Lightning Pictures; Mack-Taylor Productions; Precision Films
- Distributed by: Metro-Goldwyn-Mayer (United States); Vestron Pictures (International)
- Release dates: January 1990 (Sundance Film Festival); March 16, 1990
- Running time: 102 minutes
- Country: United States
- Language: English
- Box office: $8.2 million

Blue Steel is a 1990 American neo-noir action thriller film directed by Kathryn Bigelow and starring Jamie Lee Curtis, Ron Silver and Clancy Brown.

Blue Steel was originally set to be released by Vestron Pictures and its offshoot label Lightning Pictures, but the film was ultimately acquired by Metro-Goldwyn-Mayer due to Vestron's financial problems and eventual bankruptcy. The film was green lit and produced by Lawrence Kasanoff, Lightning’s head of production at that time.

== Plot ==
Rookie NYPD officer Megan Turner shoots a robber dead with her service revolver while he is holding up a neighborhood supermarket. The robber's gun falls to the ground and lands near commodities trader Eugene Hunt, one of the customers taken hostage. Hunt takes the gun and slips away. Because the weapon was not found at the scene and the other witnesses are unclear about seeing a handgun, Turner is accused of killing an unarmed man and is subsequently suspended.

Hunt uses the gun to commit random killings. At the scene of the first murder, he leaves behind a spent cartridge case on which he has carved Turner's name. Hunt soon begins hearing voices telling him he is unique and to kill again. Meanwhile, while attempting to clear her name with Assistant Chief Stanley Hoyt and her superiors, Turner begins dating Hunt, unaware that he has become obsessed with her. One night at his apartment, Hunt reveals to Turner that he was at the supermarket robbery, that he took the gun and that he is the person behind the recent killings. Turner arrests him but he is freed by his attorney, Mel Dawson, due to a lack of evidence.

Turner fights to keep her badge and solve the murders with the help of Detective Nick Mann. While she tries to unwind with her best friend Tracy Perez, Hunt arrives at her apartment and mortally wounds Tracy before rendering Turner unconscious with a blow to the head and then burying the gun in a park. Turner regains consciousness and goes to Hunt's apartment with Mann to arrest him, but Dawson prevents her from doing so by contending that she did not actually see his face.

Seeking comfort from her mother Shirley, Turner visits her family home, an uncomfortable place because her father Frank physically abused her mother throughout her childhood. After arriving there, she finds that her mother is bruised. Enraged, Turner handcuffs Frank and arrests him. During the drive, they stop and talk in an attempt to put an end to his abuse. When they return to the house, Hunt is posing as a guest sitting with her mother. An exchange takes place between the two, where they both imply that they are armed. When he leaves, she goes to his apartment and spends the night staking him out.

The next morning, Turner follows Hunt to the park where he buried his gun. Mann interrupts another standoff between Hunt and Turner, where she is attempting to get Hunt to try for her gun; Hunt runs off. Believing that he will return for the murder weapon, they stake out the park. Turner sees the beam of a flashlight and assumes it is Hunt searching for the gun. She leaves the car to apprehend him, but not before handcuffing Mann to the steering wheel to prevent him from following her. The flashlight turns out to be a ruse: Hunt paid a homeless woman to decoy the police. Meanwhile, Hunt is holding Mann at gunpoint. Turner appears and fires her gun, shooting Hunt in the left arm before he escapes in traffic.

Mann and Turner return to her apartment, where unbeknown to them, Hunt is patching up his wound in her bathroom. The pair have sex and Mann is ambushed by Hunt and shot when he goes to the bathroom. Turner does not hear the shot because it was muffled by a towel. Hunt attacks and rapes Turner and she eventually kicks him away and gets her hands on her gun and shoots at him, but he flees. Mann is unconscious and taken to the hospital, where Turner is told that he will survive.

Determined to find Hunt and finish him off, Turner knocks out her police guard, then takes his uniform and gun. She wanders the streets and Hunt follows her into the subway. Turner and Hunt are both shot and the gun fight carries on out to the street. She shoots him dead after a violent confrontation in the middle of Wall Street after she appropriates a civilian vehicle, running him down. First-responding police officers arrive and Turner is taken away for medical treatment.

== Cast ==
- Jamie Lee Curtis as Officer Megan Turner
- Ron Silver as Eugene Hunt
- Clancy Brown as Detective Nick Mann
- Elizabeth Peña as Tracy Perez
- Louise Fletcher as Shirley Turner
- Philip Bosco as Frank Turner
- Richard Jenkins as Dawson
- Kevin Dunn as Assistant Chief Stanley Hoyt
- Tom Sizemore as Robber
- Mary Mara as Wife
- Skipp Lynch as Instructor
- John Capodice as Trial Commissioner
- Mike Hodge as Police Commissioner
- Mike Starr as Superintendent
- Lauren Tom as Female Reporter

== Production ==
According to Kathryn Bigelow, the film came about as a result of interest Oliver Stone had in producing whatever she had wanted to do after a handful of years gestating a pitch about gangs (initially, it had started as a possible project for Walter Hill to produce at Universal). Stone had initially been interested in doing a project about gangs in South Los Angeles and having her write it with him but film commitments belayed that interest. Stone served as a producer along with Edward R. Pressman, which helped the film get financed.

Red has referred to the script as "just a female version of The Hitcher", which he had written.

Jamie Lee Curtis revealed that the original script had her nude during the final gunfight; she refused to film the scene, so it was rewritten to have her character dressed in a stolen police uniform.

== Reception ==
=== Box office ===
Blue Steel premiered at the Sundance Film Festival in Park City, Utah in January 1990. The film was not a box office success.

=== Critical response ===
On Rotten Tomatoes, the film has an approval rating of 75% based on 28 critics reviews, with an average rating of 6.00/10. The consensus states: "Blue Steel's increasingly over-the-top story beggars disbelief, but this cop drama is elevated by an appealing cast and Kathryn Bigelow's stylish direction." On Metacritic, the film has a score of 54% based on reviews from 20 critics, indicating "mixed or average" reviews. Audiences polled by CinemaScore gave the film an average grade of "B−" on an A+ to F scale.

Film critic Roger Ebert compared it to John Carpenter's Halloween, noting: "Blue Steel is a sophisticated update of Halloween, the movie that first made Jamie Lee Curtis a star. (...) What makes it more interesting than yet another sequel to Halloween is the way the filmmakers have fleshed out the formula with intriguing characters and a few angry ideas." Entertainment Weekly stated: "Blue Steel turns into yet another movie about Jamie Lee Curtis bravely fighting off a bogeyman. It's Halloween 1990. Still, Bigelow's talent cuts through in flashes." The New York Times praised Curtis's performance, stating that she "makes Megan so appealing and real that the film holds together even when it has no reason to."
