= List of Janet Leigh performances =

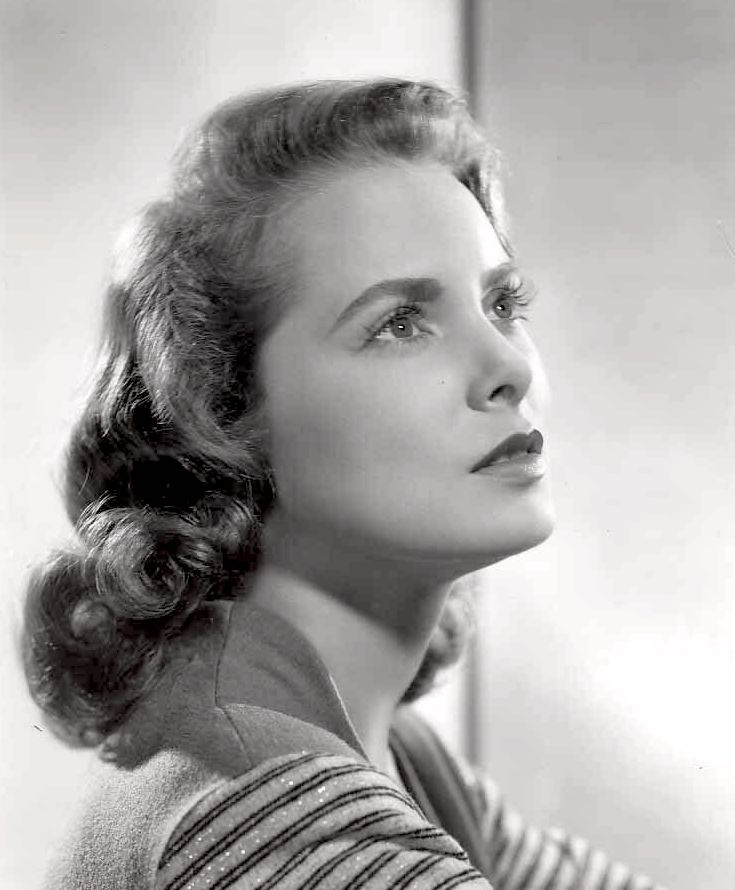
Leigh in 1949

Janet Leigh was an American actress of film, television, stage, and radio, whose career spanned over five decades. Discovered by actress Norma Shearer, Leigh began her career appearing in several popular films for MGM which spanned a wide variety of genres, including Act of Violence (1948), Little Women (1949), Angels in the Outfield (1951), Scaramouche (1952), The Naked Spur (1953), and Living It Up (1954).

In the latter part of the 1950s, Leigh had supporting roles in Safari (1956), and Orson Welles's film noir Touch of Evil (1958). She went on to gain lasting recognition for her portrayal of the doomed Marion Crane in Alfred Hitchcock's horror film Psycho (1960), which earned her a Golden Globe Award for Best Supporting Actress and an Academy Award nomination for Best Supporting Actress.

In 1962, she starred in the thriller The Manchurian Candidate, before deciding to scale back her career. Leigh continued to appear in films intermittently throughout the 1960s, with roles in Bye Bye Birdie (1963) and Harper (1966). She began to appear in television frequently in the 1970s, and had roles in such films as Night of the Lepus (1972) and Boardwalk (1979). In 1975, she made her Broadway debut in a production of Murder Among Friends. Leigh subsequently starred in two horror films with her daughter, Jamie Lee Curtis: John Carpenter's The Fog (1980) and Halloween H20: 20 Years Later (1998).

Her last film role was in the comedy Bad Girls from Valley High, filmed in 2000 and released posthumously. Leigh died in 2004 of vasculitis, aged 77.

== Film ==
Year	Title	Role	Notes	Ref.
1947	The Romance of Rosy Ridge	Lissy Anne MacBean		
1947	If Winter Comes	Effie Bright		
1948	Hills of Home	Margit Mitchell	Alternative titles: Danger in the Hills and Master of Lassie	
1948	Words and Music	Dorothy Feiner Rodgers		
1949	How to Smuggle a Hernia Across the Border	Herself	Short film	
1949	Act of Violence	Edith Enley		
1949	Little Women	Meg March		
1949	The Red Danube	Maria Buhlen		
1949	The Doctor and the Girl	Evelyn Heldon	Alternative title: Bodies and Souls	
1949	That Forsyte Woman	June Forsyte	Alternative title: The Forsyte Saga	
1949	Holiday Affair	Connie Ennis		
1951	Strictly Dishonorable	Isabelle Perry		
1951	Angels in the Outfield	Jennifer Paige		
1951	Two Tickets to Broadway	Nancy Peterson		
1951	It's a Big Country	Rosa Szabo Xenophon	Third segment	
1952	Just This Once	Lucy Duncan		
1952	Scaramouche	Aline de Gavrillac de Bourbon		
1952	Fearless Fagan	Abby Ames		
1953	The Naked Spur	Lina Patch		
1953	Confidentially Connie	Connie Bedloe		
1953	Houdini	Bess Houdini		
1953	Walking My Baby Back Home	Chris Hall		
1954	Prince Valiant	Princess Aleta		
1954	Living It Up	Wally Cook		
1954	The Black Shield of Falworth	Lady Anne		
1954	Rogue Cop	Karen Stephanson		
1955	Pete Kelly's Blues	Ivy Conrad		
1955	My Sister Eileen	Eileen Sherwood		
1956	Safari	Linda Latham		
1957	Jet Pilot	Lt. Anna Marladovna Shannon; Olga Orlief	Filmed in 1949	
1958	Touch of Evil	Susan Vargas		
1958	The Vikings	Morgana		
1958	The Perfect Furlough	Lt. Vicki Loren		
1960	Who Was That Lady?	Ann Wilson		
1960	Psycho	Marion Crane		
1960	Pepe	Herself		
1962	The Manchurian Candidate	Eugenie Rose Chaney		
1963	Bye Bye Birdie	Rosie DeLeon		
1963	Wives and Lovers	Bertie Austin		
1966	Kid Rodelo	Nora		
1966	Harper	Susan Harper	Alternative title: The Moving Target	
1966	Three on a Couch	Dr. Elizabeth Acord		
1966	An American Dream	Cherry McMahon	Alternative title: See You in Hell, Darling	
1967	The Spy in the Green Hat	Miss Diketon	Re-edited from episodes of The Man from U.N.C.L.E.	
1967	Grand Slam	Mary Ann	Alternative title: Ad ogni costo	
1969	Hello Down There	Vivian Miller	Alternative title: Sub-A-Dub-Dub	
1972	One Is a Lonely Number	Gert Meredith	Alternative title: Two Is a Happy Number	
1972	Night of the Lepus	Gerry Bennett	Alternative title: Rabbits	
1979	Boardwalk	Florence Cohen		
1980	The Fog	Kathy Williams		
1985	The Fantasy Film Worlds of George Pal	Herself	Documentary film	
1998	Halloween H20: 20 Years Later	Norma Watson		
2005	Bad Girls from Valley High	Edwina Witt	Filmed in 2000; released posthumously	

== Television ==
Year	Title	Role	Notes
1954–1961	What's My Line?	Mystery Guest	4 episodes
1957	Schlitz Playhouse of Stars	Mother	Episode: "Carriage from Britain"
1961	I've Got a Secret	Herself	Episode dated December 11, 1961
1964	Bob Hope Presents the Chrysler Theatre	Carol Hartley	Episode: "Murder in the First"
1965	The Bob Hope Special	Herself	Television special
1966	Bob Hope Presents the Chrysler Theatre	Virginia Ballard	Episode: "Dear Deductible"
1966	The Man from U.N.C.L.E.	Miss Diketon	Episodes: "The Concrete Overcoat Affair" (Parts 1 & 2)
1966	The Red Skelton Show	Daisy June	Episode: "Jerk Be Nimble"
1967	The Jerry Lewis Show	Miss Fagelter	Episode: #1.4
1967	The Dean Martin Show	Herself	Episode: #3.4
1968	The Bob Hope Special	Herself	Television special
1968	The Danny Thomas Hour	Liza Merrick	Episode: "One for My Baby"
1969	The Monk	Janice Barnes	ABC Movie of the Week
1969	The Red Skelton Show	Clara Appleby	Episode: "It's Better to Have Loved and Lost - Much Better"
1969	Honeymoon with a Stranger	Sandra Latham	ABC Movie of the Week
1970	House on Greenapple Road	Marian Ord	Television film
1970	The Virginian	Jenny Davis	Episode: "Jenny"
1970	Bracken's World	Maggie Morgan	Episode: "The Anonymous Star"
1971	The Name of the Game	Glory Bates	Episode: "The Man Who Killed a Ghost"
1971	My Wives Jane	Jane Franklin	Television pilot
1971	The Deadly Dream	Laurel Hanley	ABC Movie of the Week
1973	Circle of Fear	Carol	Episode: "Death's Head"
1973	Murdock's Gang	Laura Talbot	Television film
1973	Love Story	Leonie	Episode: "Beginner's Luck"
1975	Movin' On	Nina Smith	Episode: "Weddin' Bells"
1975	Columbo	Grace Wheeler	Episode: "Forgotten Lady"
1977	Murder at the World Series	Karen Weese	Television film
1977	Telethon	Elaine Cotten	Television film
1978	The Love Boat	Gail	Episode: "Till Death Do Us Part-Maybe/Locked Away/Chubs"
1979	Fantasy Island	Carol Gates	Episode: "Birthday Party/Ghostbreaker"
1979	Mirror, Mirror	Millie Gorman	Television film
1982	Tales of the Unexpected	Joan Stackpole	Episode: "Light Fingers"
1982	Matt Houston	Ramona Launders	Episode: "Who Would Kill Ramona?"
1982	Fantasy Island	Suzanne King	Episode: "Roller Derby Dolls/Thanks a Million"
1985	The Love Boat	Joan Philipps	Episode: "Instinct/Unmade for Each Other/BOS"
1985	On Our Way	Kate Walsh	Television film
1986	Starman	Antonia Weyburn	Episode: "Society's Pet"
1987	Murder, She Wrote	Cornelia Montaigne Harper	Episode: "Doom with a View"
1989	The Twilight Zone	Barbara LeMay	Episode: "Rendezvous in a Dark Place"
1997	Touched by an Angel	Vera King	Episode: "Charades"
1999	In My Sister's Shadow	Kay Connor	Television film
2001	Family Law	Mary Sawyer	Episode: "The Quality of Mercy"

== Radio ==
Year	Title	Episode	Ref.
1952	Lux Radio Theatre	Strictly Dishonorable	
1952	Stars in the Air	Model Wife	

== Stage ==
Title	Role	Opening date	Closing date	Venue	Notes	Ref.
Murder Among Friends	Angela Forrester	December 28, 1975	January 10, 1976	Biltmore Theatre	Broadway debut	

== Sources ==
- Capua, Michaelangelo (2013). Janet Leigh: A Biography. McFarland. ISBN 978-0-786-47022-8.
