= Brooks Thomas =

American lawyer

Benjamin Brooks Thomas
- Born: November 28, 1931; Philadelphia, PA
- Died: February 5, 2010 (aged 78); San Diego, California, United States
- Education: Yale Law School
- Occupations: Lawyer, executive
- Employers: Winthrop, Stimson, Putnam & Roberts; Harper & Row

Benjamin Brooks Thomas (November 28, 1931 – February 5, 2010) was an American lawyer and executive of Harper & Row. He was the only child of Walter Horstmann Thomas, a Philadelphia Architect, and Ruth Sterling Boomer. Thomas joined Harper & Row in 1968.

Brooks Thomas married Kiono K (Tucciarone) Thomas on October 7, 2004.

== Early career ==
Thomas graduated from Yale in 1953 and received his law degree from Yale Law School in 1956. Afterwards he served as an intelligence officer on the USS Essex for the U.S. Navy.

After leaving the navy, Thomas joined Winthrop, Stimson, Putnam & Roberts, now known as Pillsbury Winthrop Shaw Pittman. After leaving Winthrop, Thomas joined Harper & Row.

== Harper & Row ==
At Harper & Row Thomas served as vice president, CEO, president, and chief executive. During this time, Harper & Row sued The Nation over its publication of President Gerald Ford's memoirs in a case that challenged fair use in copyright law. Harper & Row prevailed before the Supreme Court.

Thomas was president of the Association of American Publishers (as well as Harper & Row) in 1983 when that group voted to fund a revamped version of American Book Awards, ending a four-year experiment on the Academy Awards model. For 1984 the number of awards was cut from 27 to three.

== Later life and death ==
After leaving Harper & Row, Thomas devoted himself to several charities. These included Outward Bound, the educational organization that promotes self-discovery in the outdoors. He became a trustee of Outward Bound USA in 1980, serving as its chairman from 1984 to 1987. He was a trustee of Outward Bound International from 1997 to 2003, and in 2000 he became a trustee of Outward Bound's Expeditionary Learning Schools. Thomas was also involved with Young Audiences, a national organization that provides arts programs to schools. Additionally, Thomas was chairman of the Vail Valley Institute, which holds seminars on public issues.

Brooks Thomas died in San Diego from complications of a brain injury after a fall that he had suffered several weeks earlier. At the time, he was on his way to San Francisco to attend an Outward Bound board meeting.
