= Janet Leigh =

American actress and author (1927–2004)

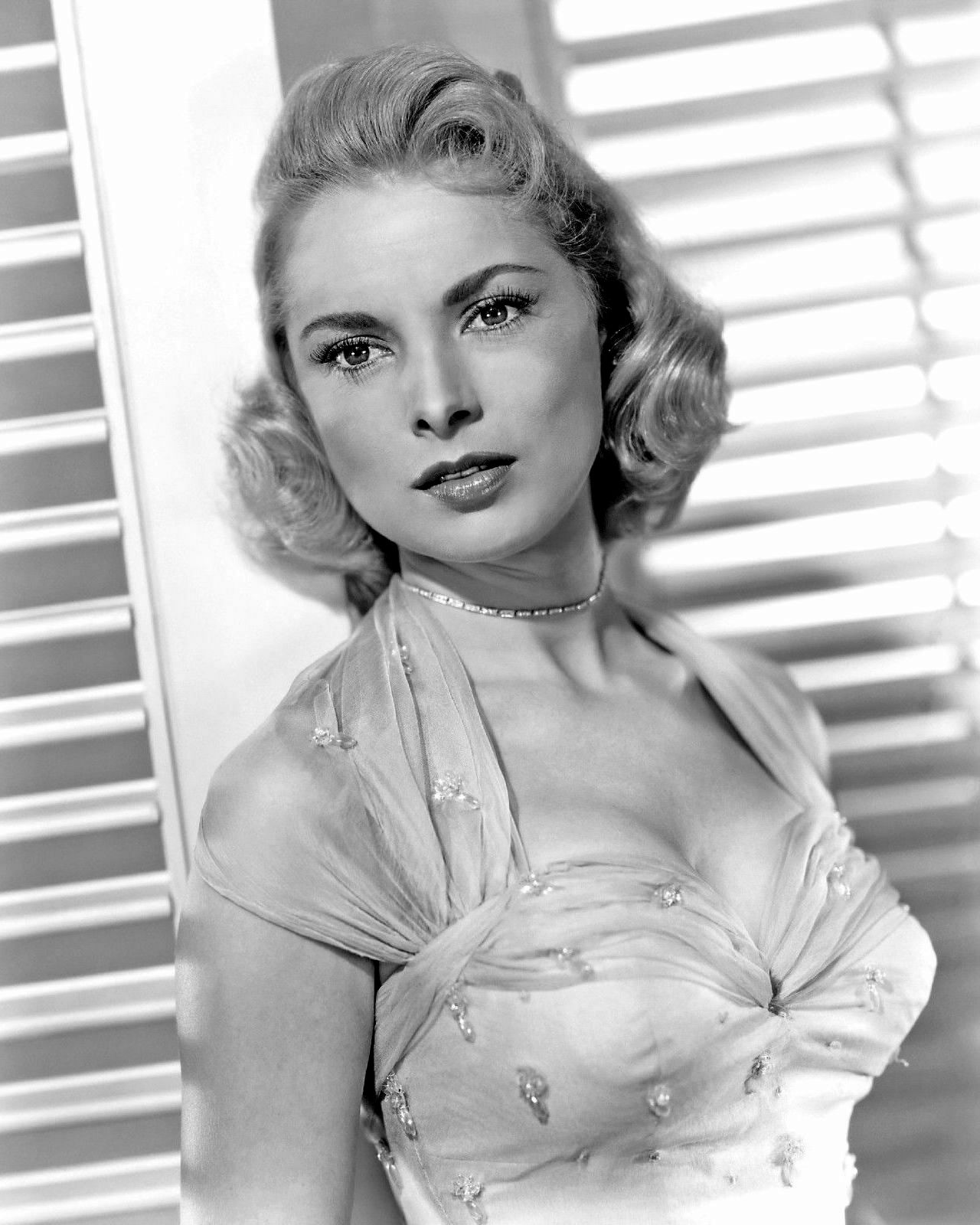
- Leigh in the 1950s
- Born: Jeanette Helen Morrison; July 6, 1927; Merced, California, U.S.
- Died: October 3, 2004 (aged 77); Beverly Hills, California, U.S.
- Resting place: Westwood Village Memorial Park Cemetery
- Occupations: Actress; author
- Years active: 1947–2004
- Spouses: John Carlisle (m. 1942; ann. 1942) Stanley Reames (m. 1945; div. 1948) Tony Curtis (m. 1951; div. 1962) Robert Brandt (m. 1962)
- Children: Kelly Curtis; Jamie Lee Curtis

Jeanette Helen Morrison (July 6, 1927 – October 3, 2004), known professionally as Janet Leigh, was an American actress, businesswoman and author. Leigh was established as one of the earliest scream queens for starring in horror films, and is also known for starring in dramatic productions for Metro-Goldwyn-Mayer (MGM). She amassed several screen and stage credits over five decades, and received accolades such as a Golden Globe Award, a Laurel Award, and a nomination for an Academy Award.

Raised in Stockton, California, by working-class parents, Leigh was discovered at 18 by actress Norma Shearer, who helped her secure a contract with MGM. She appeared in films such as the drama The Romance of Rosy Ridge (1947), the crime drama Act of Violence (1948), the adaptation of Little Women (1949), the comedy Angels in the Outfield (1951), the swashbuckler romance Scaramouche (1952) and the Western drama The Naked Spur (1953). She had two marriages in the 1940s before marrying actor Tony Curtis in 1951.

After leaving MGM in 1954, Leigh signed with Universal and Columbia Pictures, starring in films such as the adventure feature Safari (1956) and Orson Welles' film noir Touch of Evil (1958). She achieved success playing Marion Crane in Alfred Hitchcock's horror film Psycho (1960), winning the Golden Globe Award for Best Supporting Actress and earning a nomination for the Academy Award for Best Supporting Actress. Leigh was established as a scream queen and received a star on the Hollywood Walk of Fame that same year.

In 1962, Leigh and Curtis divorced, and she married Robert Brandt. She then starred in the political thriller The Manchurian Candidate (1962), the musical Bye Bye Birdie (1963), and the thriller Harper (1966) before scaling back her career. She made her Broadway debut in a production of Murder Among Friends (1975) and appeared in the horror film Night of the Lepus (1972) and the thriller Boardwalk (1979). She later starred with her daughter, Jamie Lee Curtis, in the horror films The Fog (1980) and Halloween H20: 20 Years Later (1998).

Outside of acting, Leigh co-founded Curtleigh Productions with Curtis, who produced a handful of successful films between 1955 and 1962. She wrote four books between 1984 and 2002, two of which were novels. On October 3, 2004, she died at the age of 77 of vasculitis.

== Early life and education ==
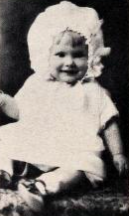
9-month-old Leigh, c. April 1928

Jeanette Helen Morrison was born on July 6, 1927, in Merced, California, the child of Helen Lita (née Westergaard) and Frederick Robert Morrison. Her maternal grandparents were immigrants from Denmark, and her father had Scots-Irish and German ancestry. Shortly after Leigh's birth, the family relocated to Stockton where she spent her early life. She was brought up in poverty as her father struggled to support the family with his factory employment, and he took various additional jobs after the Great Depression.

Leigh was raised Presbyterian and sang in the local church choir throughout her childhood. In 1941 when her paternal grandfather became terminally ill, the family relocated to Merced, moving into her grandparents' home. She attended Weber Grammar School in Stockton and later Stockton High School. Leigh excelled in academics and graduated from high school at age sixteen.

After a tenure at Stockton College (San Joaquin Delta College), Leigh enrolled at the College of the Pacific (University of the Pacific) in September 1943, where she majored in music and psychology. During the college years, she joined the Alpha Theta Tau sorority and also sang with the college's a cappella choir. She also re-enrolled in night classes at the University of Southern California in early 1947. In order to help support her family, she spent Christmas and summer vacations working at retail shops and dime stores, as well as working at the college's information desk during the semesters.

== Career ==
=== Discovery by MGM ===
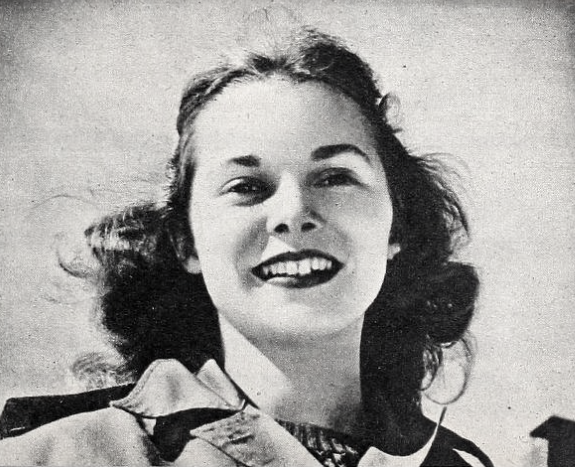
Leigh pictured at age eighteen, c. 1945; actress Norma Shearer helped facilitate her contract with MGM based on this photo.

In February 1946, actress Norma Shearer was vacationing at Sugar Bowl, a ski resort in the Sierra Nevada mountains where Leigh's parents were working at the time. In the resort lobby, Shearer noticed a photograph of Leigh taken by her father over the Christmas holiday, which he had printed and placed in a photo album available for guests to browse.

Upon returning to Los Angeles, Shearer showed Metro-Goldwyn-Mayer (MGM) talent agent Lew Wasserman the photograph of the then 18-year-old Leigh (Shearer's late husband Irving Thalberg had been head of production at MGM). She would later recall that "that smile made it the most fascinating face I had seen in years. I felt I had to show that face to somebody at the studio." Through her association with MGM, Shearer was able to facilitate screen tests for Leigh with Selena Royle, after which Wasserman negotiated a contract for her, despite her having no acting experience. Leigh dropped out of college that year and was soon placed under the tutelage of drama coach Lillian Burns.

Prior to beginning her film career, Leigh was a guest star on the radio drama anthology The Cresta Blanca Hollywood Players. Her initial appearance on radio at age 19 was for the program's production "All Through the House," a Christmas special that aired on December 24, 1946. She made her film debut in the big-budget Civil War film The Romance of Rosy Ridge (1947) as the romantic interest of box-office star Van Johnson's character. She got the role when performing Phyllis Thaxter's long speech in Thirty Seconds Over Tokyo for the head of the studio talent department. During the film shoot, Leigh's name was first changed to "Jeanette Reames", then to "Janet Leigh", and finally back to her birth name "Jeanette Morrison", as the studio felt "Janet Leigh" might cause confusion with actress Vivien Leigh. However, Johnson did not like the name and it was ultimately changed back to "Janet Leigh" (pronounced "Lee").

=== Breakthrough and early successes ===
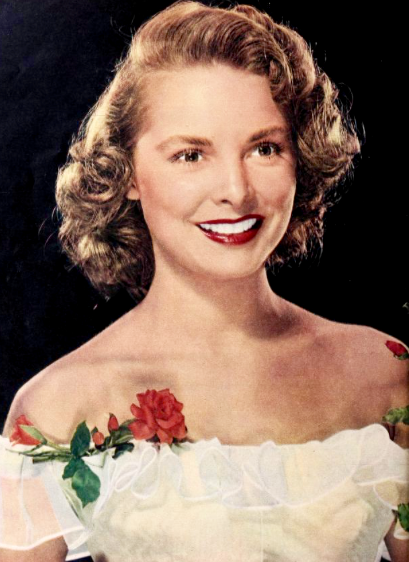
Leigh in 1950

Immediately after the release of The Romance of Rosy Ridge, Leigh was cast with Walter Pidgeon, Deborah Kerr, and Angela Lansbury in the drama If Winter Comes (1947), playing a young pregnant woman in an English village. By early 1948, Leigh was occupied with the shooting of the Lassie film Hills of Home (1948), her third feature and the first in which she received star billing. She played the young wife of composer Richard Rodgers in MGM's all-star musical, Words and Music (1948). In late 1948, she was hailed the "No. 1 glamour girl" of Hollywood, even though she was known for her polite, generous, and down-to-earth persona.

Leigh began 1949 with the thriller Act of Violence (1949) opposite Van Heflin and Robert Ryan, directed by Fred Zinnemann. Though a financial failure, it was well received by critics. She also had a significant hit with MGM's version of Little Women, based on the Civil War-era novel by Louisa May Alcott, in which she portrayed Meg March, alongside June Allyson and Elizabeth Taylor. The film was also generally praised by critics. Then Leigh appeared as an expatriate Russian ballerina in the anti-communist drama The Red Danube, which earned her critical acclaim, followed by a role as Glenn Ford's love interest in The Doctor and the Girl. Other credits from 1949 include the role of June Forsyte in That Forsyte Woman (1949), opposite Greer Garson and Errol Flynn, and as Robert Mitchum's leading co-star in the RKO-produced Holiday Affair (1949).

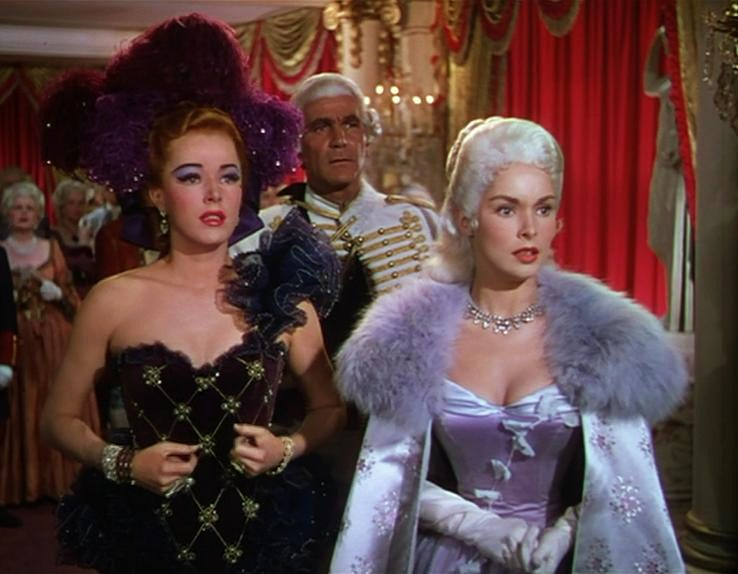
L–R: Eleanor Parker, Henry Wilcoxon, and Leigh in Scaramouche (1952)

At MGM she appeared in Strictly Dishonorable (1951), a comedy with Ezio Pinza, based on a play by Preston Sturges. The film received mild critical acclaim. Leigh then appeared in the baseball-themed fantasy farce Angels in the Outfield (1951), which was a commercial hit. The same year, RKO borrowed Leigh to appear in the musical Two Tickets to Broadway (1951), which was a box-office success. She was one of many stars in the anthology film It's a Big Country: An American Anthology (1952) and appeared in a romantic comedy with Peter Lawford, Just This Once (1952). Leigh had another significant commercial success with the swashbuckler Scaramouche (1952), in which she starred as Aline de Gavrillac opposite Stewart Granger and Eleanor Parker. Next, she received top-billing in the critically acclaimed comedy Fearless Fagan (1952), about a clown drafted into the military.

=== Departure from MGM and production company ===
Leigh began 1953 with a role opposite James Stewart in the Western The Naked Spur. The latter, though a low-budget feature, was one of the top-grossing films of the year and was noted by several critics for its psychological components. Less well received was the comedy Confidentially Connie (1953), in which Leigh starred opposite Van Johnson as a pregnant housewife who helps trigger a price war at a local butcher shop. Paramount borrowed Leigh and Tony Curtis for the biographical feature Houdini (1953) – the couple's first film together – with the two appearing as Bess and Harry Houdini, respectively. The couple also appeared as guests on Martin and Lewis' Colgate Comedy Hour before Leigh was loaned to Universal to appear in the musical Walking My Baby Back Home (1953).

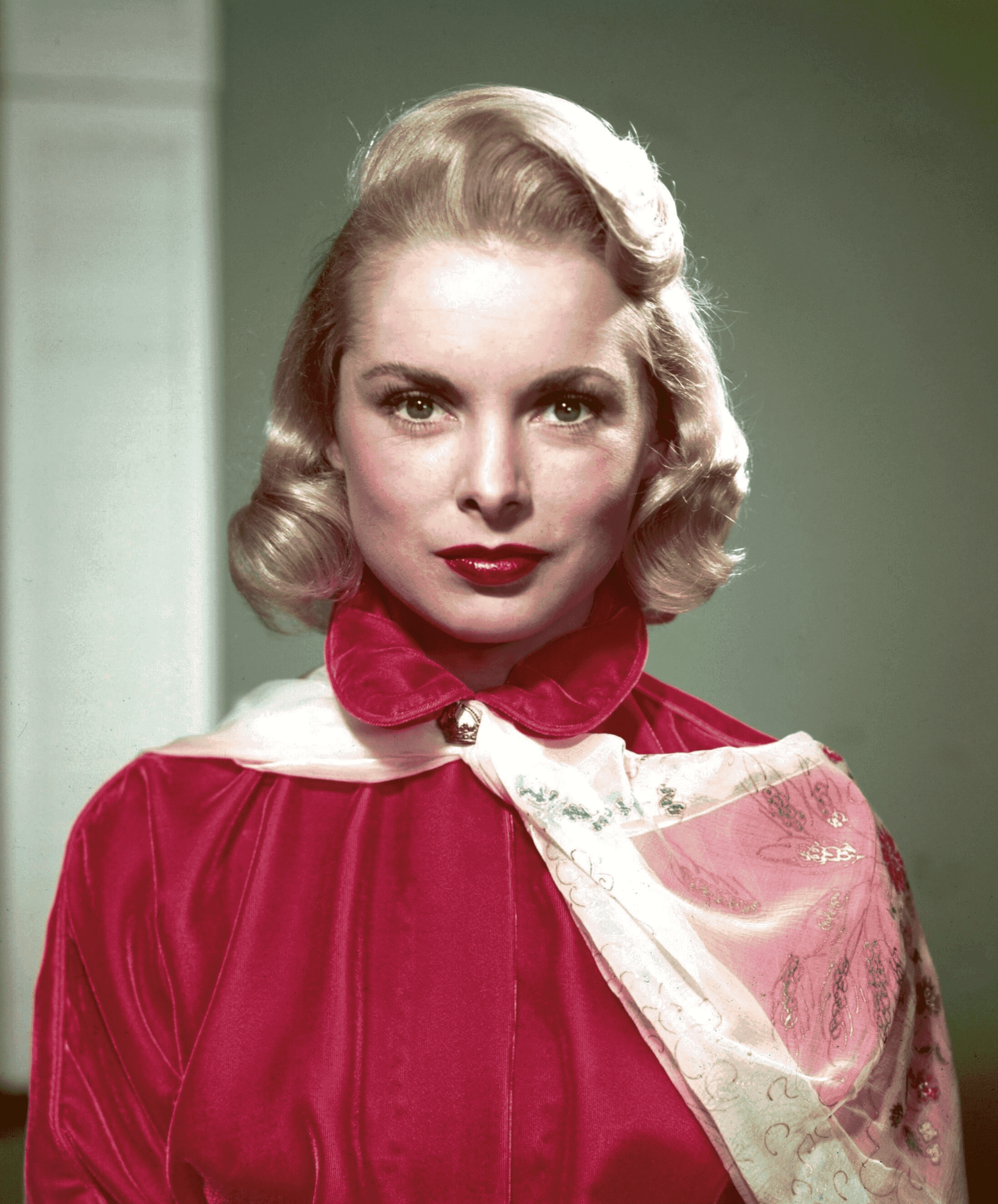
Leigh in 1954

Leigh was cast as Robert Wagner's love interest in the Fox-produced adventure film Prince Valiant (1954), a Viking-themed feature based on Hal Foster's comic of the same name. Also in 1954, Leigh had a supporting role in the Dean Martin and Jerry Lewis comedy Living It Up (1954) for Paramount, followed by Universal's swashbuckler film The Black Shield of Falworth (1954), in which she performed opposite Curtis for a second time. Leigh also starred opposite Robert Taylor in MGM's film noir Rogue Cop (1954), portraying a femme fatale lounge singer. Variety deemed her performance in the film "satisfactory" but faulted the screenplay for being illogical. Following that film, Leigh ended her contract with MGM after eight years. In April 1954 Leigh signed a four-picture contract with Universal, where her now husband Tony was based. She also signed a contract with Columbia to make one film a year for five years. Leigh appeared in Pete Kelly's Blues (1954) with Jack Webb (who also directed).

Leigh starred in her first feature under the deal with Columbia: the title role in the musical comedy My Sister Eileen (1955), co-starring Jack Lemmon, Betty Garrett, and Dick York, and based on a series of New Yorker stories about two sisters living in New York City. In early 1955, Leigh and Curtis formed their own independent film production company, Curtleigh Productions. Columbia cast Leigh in Safari (1956), opposite Victor Mature and shot in Kenya for Warwick Pictures. The same year, Leigh and Curtis gave birth to their first child, daughter Kelly. She subsequently made her television debut in an episode of Schlitz Playhouse, "Carriage from Britain". In 1957, the film Jet Pilot, which Leigh had filmed in 1949, was finally released. Also in 1957, Josef von Sternberg's adventure-drama film Jet Pilot was released; Leigh was cast as the female lead opposite John Wayne in 1948, and producer Howard Hughes' constant re-editing would cause the film to be delayed almost eight years before being released.

=== Career peak and hiatus ===
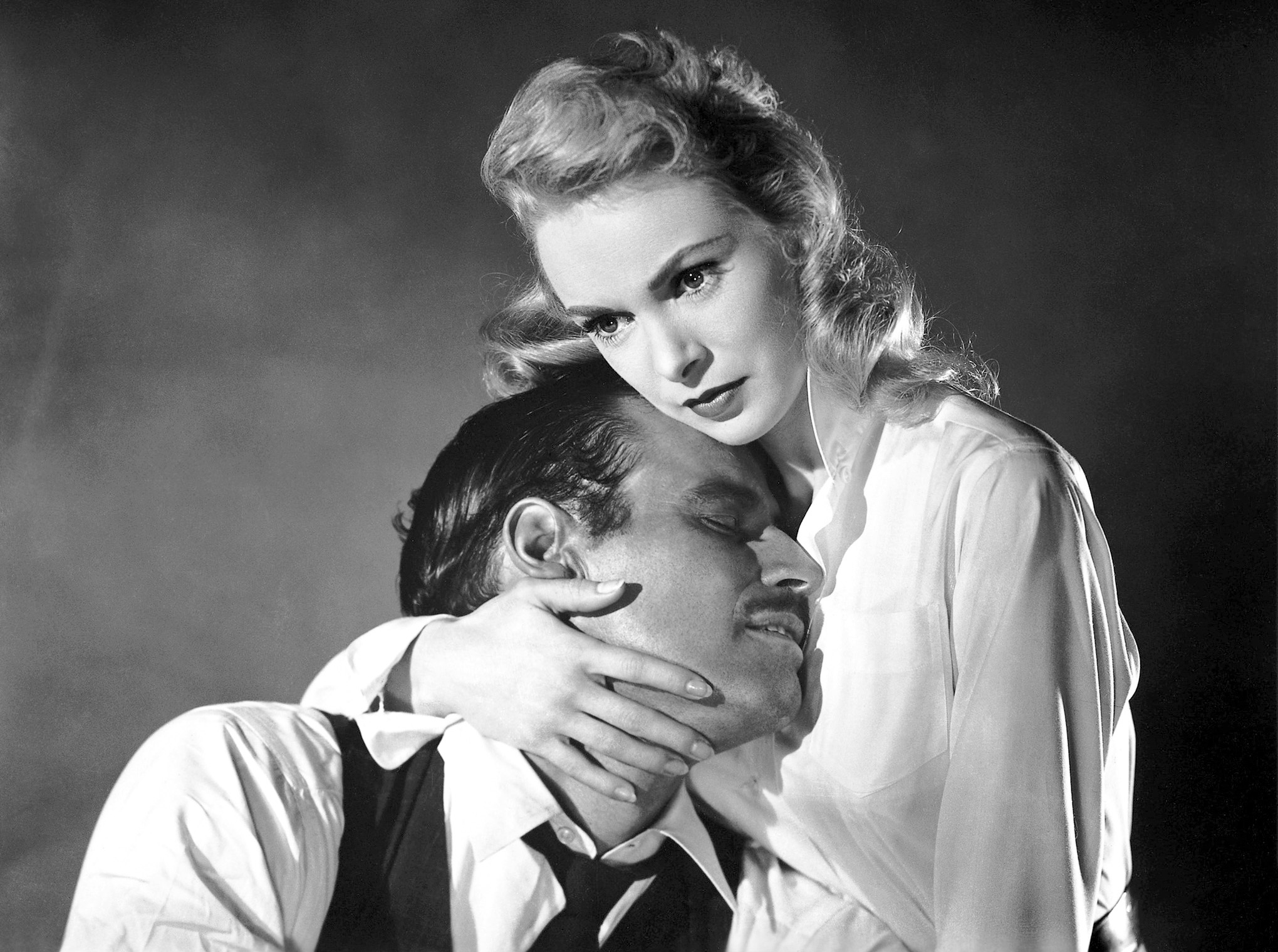
Leigh and Charlton Heston in Touch of Evil (1958)

In 1958, Leigh starred as Susan Vargas in the Orson Welles film noir classic Touch of Evil (1958), made at Universal with Charlton Heston – a film with numerous similarities to Alfred Hitchcock's Psycho, which was produced two years later. In it, she plays a newlywed tormented in a Mexican border town. Leigh would later describe shooting the film as a "great experience" but added: "Universal just couldn't understand it, so they recut it. Gone was the undisciplined but brilliant film Orson had made." Next, Leigh co-starred in her fourth film with Curtis, The Vikings (1958), produced by and co-starring Kirk Douglas and released in June 1958. Distributed by United Artists, the film had one of the most expensive marketing campaigns of the 1950s. It was ultimately a blockbuster, grossing over $13 million internationally. Leigh's next film, The Perfect Furlough, was released in early 1959, in which she again co-starred with Curtis, playing a psychiatrist lieutenant in Paris. Leigh and Curtis next co-starred in the Columbia Pictures farce Who Was That Lady? (released in early 1960), in which Leigh portrayed a wife who catches her professor husband (Curtis) cheating on her, triggering a series of mishaps.

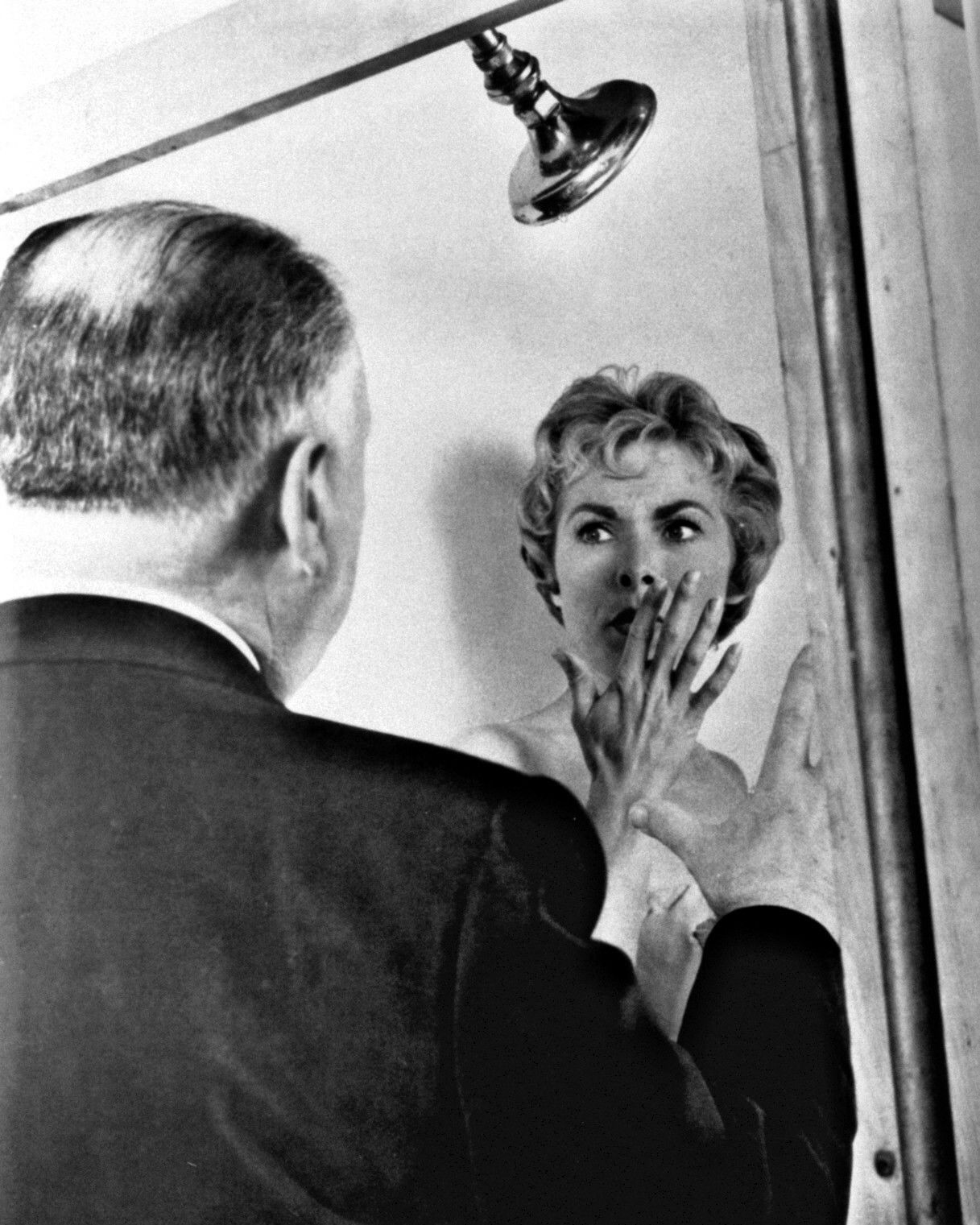
Leigh on the set of Psycho (1960) with Alfred Hitchcock, filming the infamous shower scene

In 1960, Leigh played her most iconic role as the morally conflicted murder victim Marion Crane in Alfred Hitchcock's Psycho, co-starring with John Gavin, Vera Miles, and Anthony Perkins, and released by Universal. Leigh was reportedly so traumatized from watching her character's shower murder scene that she went to great lengths to avoid showers for the rest of her life. Released in June 1960, Psycho was a major critical and commercial success. For her performance, Leigh received a Golden Globe Award for Best Supporting Actress and was nominated for the Academy Award for Best Supporting Actress. Leigh's role in Psycho became career-defining and she later commented: "I've been in a great many films, but I suppose if an actor can be remembered for one role, then they're very fortunate. And in that sense I'm fortunate." Her character's death early in the film has been noted as historically relevant by film scholars, as it violated narrative conventions of the time, while her murder scene itself is considered among both critics and film scholars to be one of the most iconic scenes in cinematic history.

Leigh and Curtis both had cameos in Columbia's all-star Pepe (1960), marking their last film together. Next, Leigh appeared in the musical comedy Bye Bye Birdie (1963), based on the hit Broadway show. She was also in the comedy Wives and Lovers (1963) for director Hal Wallis at Paramount. Leigh then took a three-year break from her acting career and turned down several roles, including the role of Simone Clouseau in The Pink Panther, because she did not want to go on location and be separated from her young daughters.

=== Return to film and television ===
Leigh returned to film in 1966, appearing in multiple projects: the western Kid Rodelo (1966), and the private detective story Harper (1966), in which she played Paul Newman's estranged wife opposite Lauren Bacall. She next portrayed a psychiatrist opposite Jerry Lewis in the comedy Three on a Couch, followed by a lead role in An American Dream, based on the Norman Mailer novel of the same name; the latter film received critical backlash.

Leigh's initial television appearances were on anthology programs such as Bob Hope Presents the Chrysler Theatre and The Red Skelton Hour. She also starred in several made-for-TV films, most notably the off-length (135 minutes instead of the usual 100) The House on Greenapple Road, which premiered on ABC in January 1970 to high ratings. In 1972, Leigh starred in the science-fiction film Night of the Lepus with Stuart Whitman, as well as the drama One Is a Lonely Number with Trish Van Devere. In 1975, she played an ex-Hollywood song-and-dance star opposite Peter Falk and John Payne in the Columbo episode "Forgotten Lady". The episode utilizes footage of Leigh from the film Walking My Baby Back Home (1953).

Her many other guest appearances on television series include The Man from U.N.C.L.E. in a two-part episode, "The Concrete Overcoat Affair", in which she played a sadistic Thrush agent named Miss Dyketon, a highly provocative role for mainstream television at the time. The two-part episode was released in Europe as a feature film entitled The Spy in the Green Hat (1967). She also appeared in the title role in The Virginian episode "Jenny" (1970). In 1973, she appeared in the episode "Beginner's Luck" of the romantic anthology series Love Story.

=== Stage debut and later career ===
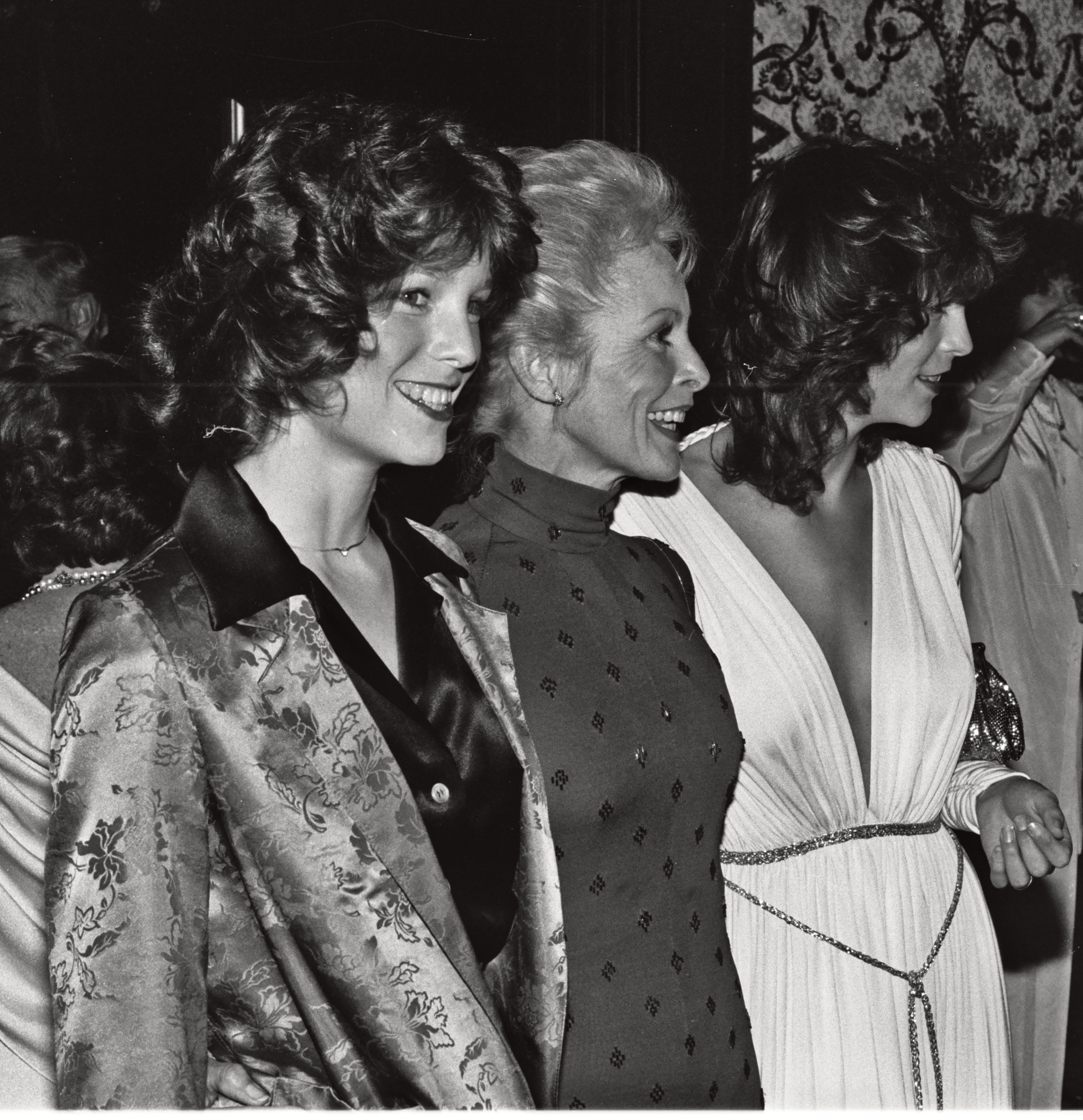
Leigh (center) with her daughters Kelly Curtis (left) and Jamie Lee Curtis (right) in May 1979

Leigh made her stage debut opposite Jack Cassidy in the original Broadway production of Murder Among Friends, which opened at the Biltmore Theatre on December 28, 1975. The play ran for seventeen performances, closing on January 10, 1976. The play received varied reviews, with some critics who attended preview performances disliking the show. In 1979, Leigh appeared in a supporting role in Boardwalk, opposite Ruth Gordon and Lee Strasberg, and received critical praise, with Vincent Canby of The New York Times lauding it as her "best role in years".

Leigh subsequently appeared opposite her daughter, Jamie Lee Curtis, in John Carpenter's supernatural horror film The Fog (1980), in which a phantom schooner unleashes ghosts on a small coastal community. She acted in the Murder, She Wrote episode "Doom with a View" (1987) and as Barbara LeMay in an episode of The Twilight Zone ("Rendezvous in a dark place", 1989). She guest-starred twice as different characters on both Fantasy Island and The Love Boat, as well as Tales of the Unexpected.

Leigh appeared in the Touched by an Angel episode "Charade" (1997). Leigh would appear with her daughter once again in Halloween H20: 20 Years Later (1998), playing the secretary of Laurie Strode. She continued to grant interviews and appear at red carpet events through the early 2000s. Her final film credit was in the teen film Bad Girls from Valley High (2005), opposite Christopher Lloyd.

== Writing ==
In addition to her work as an actress, Leigh also authored four books. Her first, the memoir There Really Was a Hollywood (1984), became a New York Times bestseller. In 1995, Leigh published the non-fiction book Psycho: Behind the Scenes of the Classic Thriller. In 1996, she published her first novel, House of Destiny, which explored the lives of two friends who forged an empire that would change the course of Hollywood's history. The book's success spawned a follow-up novel, The Dream Factory (2002), which was set in Hollywood during the height of the studio system.

== Personal life ==
=== Relationships ===
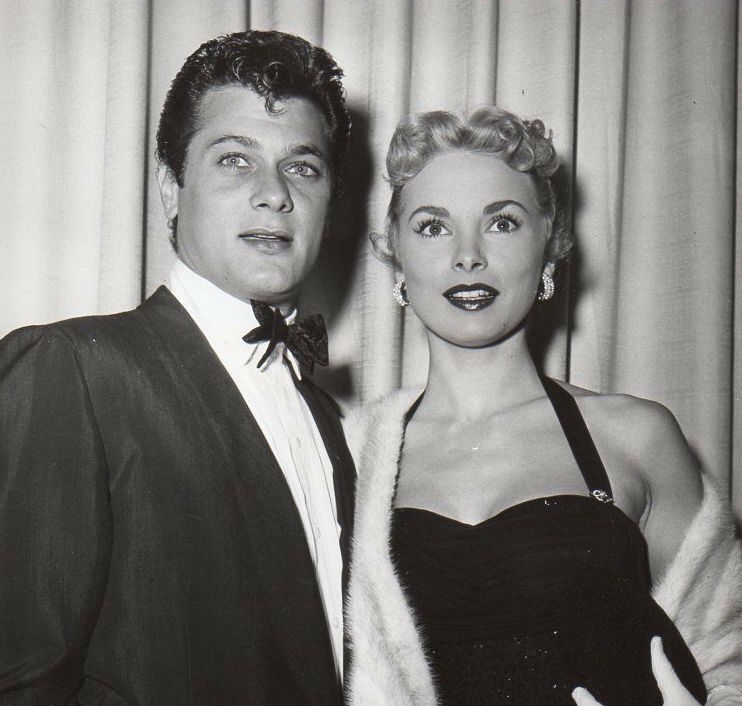
Leigh with third husband Tony Curtis at the 25th Academy Awards in March 1953

When she was still in high school, Leigh married 18-year-old John Kenneth Carlisle in Reno, Nevada, on August 1, 1942. (Note: For dramatic reasons, an article "Janet Leigh's Own Story—″I Was a Child Bride at 14!″", in the December 1960 issue of Motion Picture Magazine, wrongly stated the marriage occurred in 1941, while she was only fourteen years old.) The marriage was annulled five months later on December 28, 1942.

Leigh met Stanley Reames, a U.S. Navy sailor who was enrolled at a nearby V-12 Program. They married on October 6, 1945, when she was 18. Their marriage was short lived, and they divorced less than three years later.

On June 4, 1951, Leigh married actor Tony Curtis in a private ceremony in Greenwich, Connecticut. Their romance and marriage were frequent topics in gossip columns and film tabloids. From 1951 to 1954, Leigh and Curtis appeared in numerous home movies directed by their friend Jerry Lewis. Leigh credited the experimental and informal nature of these films for allowing her to stretch her acting ability and attempt different roles. On June 17, 1956, Leigh gave birth to her first daughter, Kelly Lee Curtis. On November 22, 1958, Leigh gave birth to her second daughter with Curtis, Jamie Lee Curtis.

In 1962, while Leigh was filming the thriller The Manchurian Candidate, Curtis filed for divorce. The divorce was finalized in Ciudad Juárez, Mexico, on September 14, 1962; the following day, Leigh married stockbroker Robert Brandt (1927–2009) in a private ceremony in Las Vegas, Nevada. Leigh would later comment that their divorce was the result of "outside problems", which included the death of Curtis's father. Leigh remained married to Brandt until her death in 2004.

=== Politics ===
A lifelong Democrat, Leigh supported John F. Kennedy in the 1960 U.S. presidential election, Lyndon B. Johnson in the 1964 presidential election and Robert F. Kennedy in the 1968 presidential election. She also served on the board of directors of the Motion Picture and Television Foundation, a medical-services provider for actors.

In 1964 Lyndon Johnson asked Leigh to accept the nomination as U.S. Ambassador to Finland, which she turned down as she considered it too early in her marriage to Brandt for them to be separated.

== Death ==
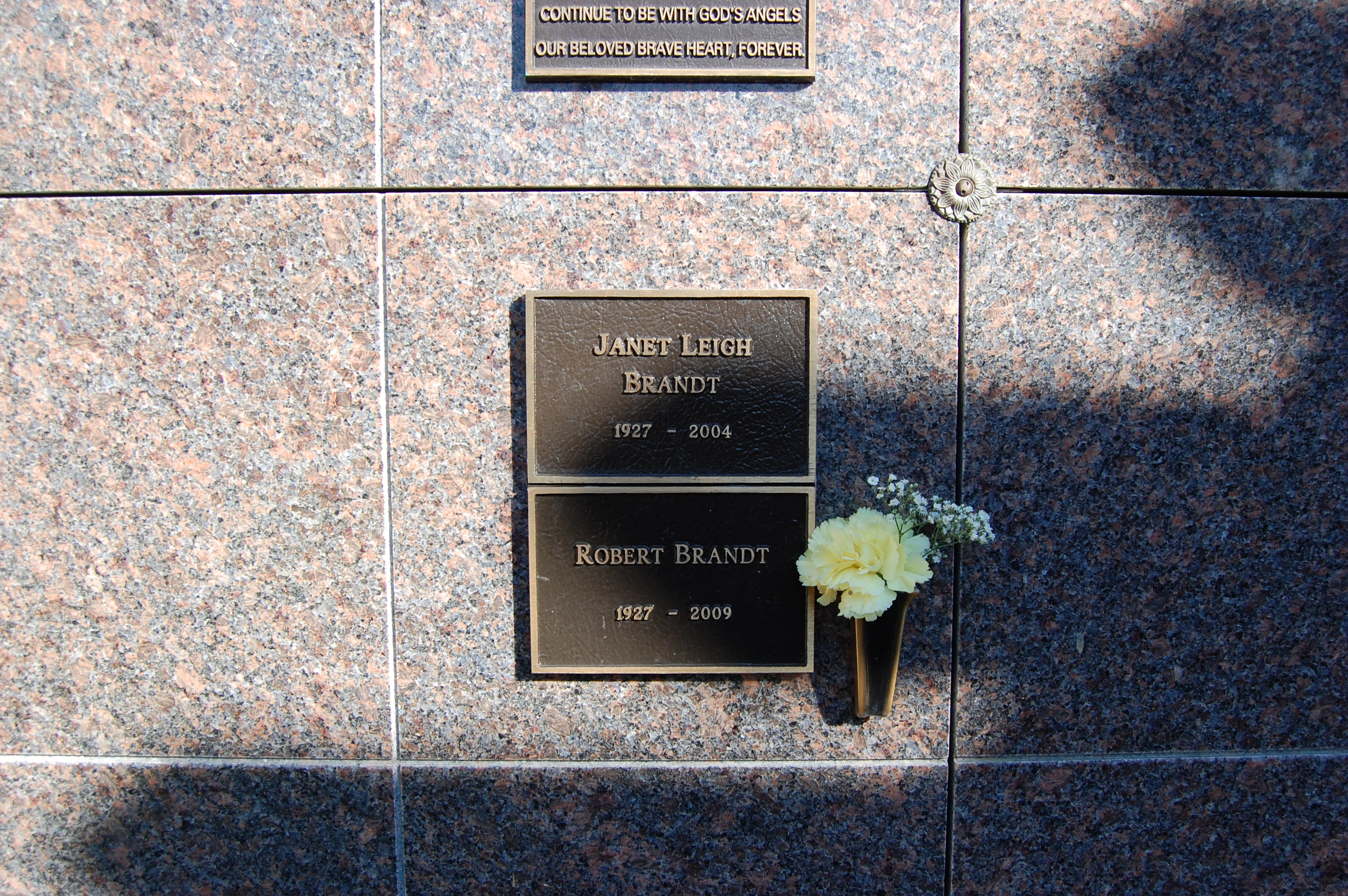
Leigh's crypt in Westwood

Leigh died at her home in Beverly Hills on October 3, 2004, at age 77 after a protracted battle with vasculitis. Her death surprised many, as she had not disclosed her illness to the public. She was survived by her daughters Kelly and Jamie and her husband of 42 years, Robert Brandt.

Leigh was cremated and her ashes were entombed at Westwood Village Memorial Park Cemetery in the Westwood Village neighborhood of Los Angeles.

== Legacy ==
In 2003, Leigh received the Ted M. Larson Award at the Fargo Film Festival for her contribution to cinema.

On May 14, 2004, Leigh was awarded an honorary Doctor of Fine Arts degree at the University of the Pacific in Stockton, California, where she had attended college. At the time, Leigh's health was compromised by vasculitis, and she delivered a speech at the ceremony from a wheelchair.

In December 2005, a ski trail at Sun Valley Resort's Bald Mountain skiing area in Sun Valley, Idaho was named after Leigh. She kept a second home there for more than 30 years.

On October 13, 2006, Jamie Lee Curtis and Kelly Curtis unveiled a bronze plaque of their mother to honor her early life in Stockton. The memorial is located in the downtown Stockton plaza adjacent to the City Center Cinemas, since renamed "Janet Leigh Plaza".

Leigh was honored posthumously by University of the Pacific with the naming of the "Janet Leigh Theatre" on the Stockton campus on June 25, 2010. The plaque at the theatre reads:

Pacific's Janet Leigh Theatre - Made possible by a generous gift from the Robert Brandt and Janet Leigh Brandt Estate. The Janet Leigh Theatre was created to bind the experiences and friendships that Janet Leigh valued while a student at Pacific. This memorial is a tribute to her life and career in the Stockton region as well as her magnificent contributions to the Hollywood film industry as an actress, wife, mother and humanitarian. Dedicated Friday, June 25, 2010.

In the 2012 film Hitchcock, Leigh is played by Scarlett Johansson.

== Filmography ==
Leigh amassed several screen and stage credits over a career spanning five decades.

== Bibliography ==
- There Really Was a Hollywood. Doubleday, 1984; ISBN 0-385-19035-2.
- Psycho: Behind the Scenes of the Classic Thriller. Harmony Books, 1995; ISBN 0-517-70112-X.
- House of Destiny. Mira Books, 1996; ISBN 1-551-66159-4.
- The Dream Factory. Mira Books, 2002; ISBN 1-551-66874-2.

== Awards and nominations ==
Awards and nominations received by Janet Leigh
Award	Year (Note: Indicates the year of ceremony. Each year is linked to the article about the awards held that year, wherever possible.)	Category	Nominated work	Result	Ref.
Academy Awards	1961	Best Supporting Actress	Psycho	Nominated	
Golden Globe Awards	1961	Best Supporting Actress	Psycho	Won	
Laurel Awards	1960	Top Female Supporting Performance	Psycho	2nd place	
Laurel Awards	1960	Top Female Comedy Performance	Pepe	1st place	
Laurel Awards	1960	Top Female Comedy Performance	Who Was That Lady?	4th place	
