= Harper & Row v. Nation Enterprises =

- Supreme Court of the United States

Argued November 6, 1984 Decided May 20, 1985
- Full case name: Harper & Row, Publishers, Inc., et al. v. Nation Enterprises, et al.
- Citations: 471 U.S. 539 (more) 105 S. Ct. 2218; 85 L. Ed. 2d 588; 1985 U.S. LEXIS 17; 53 U.S.L.W. 4562; 225 U.S.P.Q. (BNA) 1073; 11 Media L. Rep. 1969

Case history
- Prior: Certiorari to the United States Court of Appeals for the Second Circuit

Holding
- Fair use is not a defense to the pre-publication, commercial appropriation of work by a famous political figure simply because of the public interest in learning of that political figure's account of a historic event.

Court membership
- Chief Justice Warren E. Burger Associate Justices William J. Brennan Jr. · Byron White; Thurgood Marshall · Harry Blackmun; Lewis F. Powell Jr. · William Rehnquist; John P. Stevens · Sandra Day O'Connor

Case opinions
- Majority: O'Connor, joined by Burger, Blackmun, Powell, Rehnquist, Stevens
- Dissent: Brennan, joined by White, Marshall

Laws applied
- U.S. Const. amend. I, Copyright Act of 1976

Harper & Row v. Nation Enterprises, 471 U.S. 539 (1985), was a United States Supreme Court decision in which public interest in learning about a historical figure's impressions of a historic event was held not to be sufficient to show fair use of material otherwise protected by copyright. Defendant, The Nation, had summarized and quoted substantially from A Time to Heal, President Gerald Ford's forthcoming memoir of his decision to pardon former president Richard Nixon. When Harper & Row, who held the rights to A Time to Heal, brought suit, The Nation asserted that its use of the book was protected under the doctrine of fair use, because of the great public interest in a historical figure's account of a historic incident. The Court rejected this argument holding that the right of first publication was important enough to find in favor of Harper.

== Facts ==
Former President Gerald Ford had written a memoir, A Time to Heal, including an account of his decision to pardon Richard Nixon. Ford had licensed his publication rights to Harper & Row, which had contracted for excerpts of the memoir to be printed in Time magazine. Instead, The Nation magazine published 300 to 400 words of verbatim quotes from the 500-page book without the permission of Ford, Harper & Row, or Time. Based on this prior publication, Time withdrew from the contract (as it was permitted to by a clause therein), and Harper & Row filed a lawsuit against The Nation for copyright infringement. The Nation asserted as a defense that Ford was a public figure, and his reasons for pardoning Nixon were of vital interest, and that appropriation in such circumstances should qualify as a fair use.

The federal trial judge, Richard Owen, ruled in favor of Harper & Row and awarded damages. The Second Circuit Court of Appeals reversed the ruling, finding that The Nation's actions in quoting the memoirs were protected by fair use privilege. Harper & Row appealed this ruling to the Supreme Court.

== Issue ==
The issue before the Court was whether a fair use existed where the purported infringer published a public figure's unpublished work on an important public event.

== Majority and minority opinions ==
The Court, in an opinion by Justice O'Connor noted that the right of first publication is a particularly strong right, and held that there was no 'public figure' exception to copyright protection, asserting that "the promise of copyright would be an empty one if it could be avoided merely by dubbing the infringement a fair use 'news report' of the book." The Court applied the statutory four factor test to determine if the use was fair, and made the following findings:

1. The purpose or character of the use weighed against a finding of fair use because, "The Nation's use had not merely the incidental effect but the intended purpose of supplanting the copyright holder's commercially valuable right of first publication." The Nation's intent to benefit by depriving the copyright holders of their right to first publication suggest that this use was not "fair."
2. Although the nature of A Time to Heal was primarily informative or factual, and thus deserving of less copyright protection, the work had substantial expressive value. If The Nation had limited themselves to only reporting the factual descriptions in the work, the second factor would have weighed in favor of finding fair use. (Justice Brennan, dissenting, suggests that the Court does not take enough account of how much of The Nation's report was factual.) However, The Nation "did not stop at isolated phrases and instead excerpted subjective descriptions and portraits of public figures whose power lies in the author's individualized expression."
3. The amount and substantiality of the portion used in relation to the copyrighted work as a whole weighed against a finding of fair use. Although the "amount" was small, it constituted a "substantial" portion of the work because the excerpt was the "heart of the work". The Court noted that an infringer could not defend infringing copying by pointing to how much else they could have copied, but did not.
4. The effect of the use on the potential market for the value of the copyrighted work also weighed against a finding of fair use. The Nation's infringement led to actual, particular harm, Time's cancellation of their publishing contract.

Justice Brennan dissented, joined by Justices White and Marshall. Citing the text of the law under which Harper's brought their lawsuit ("The enactment of copyright legislation by Congress under the terms of the Constitution is not based upon any natural right that the author has in his writings ... but upon the ground that the welfare of the public will be served and progress of science and useful arts will be promoted by securing to authors for limited periods the exclusive rights to their writings."), Brennan found that the importance of "the robust debate of public issues" here outweighed the limited power of copyright ownership. He stated that the descriptions of the work were non-copyrightable, and the direct quotations were so few, compared to the size of the work as a whole, that The Nation's article did not constitute an appropriation of Harper's copyright. Brennan criticized the court for finding copyright infringement technically based on the 300 words that were quoted in order to protect Harper's interest in being the first to publish the non-copyrightable historical information in the work.

== Later treatment ==
The opinion was later cited by the United States Court of Appeals for the Second Circuit hearing the case of Salinger v. Random House (1987), in which J.D. Salinger had objected to the publication of his unpublished letters. The court noted that the Supreme Court ruling on Harper & Row v. Nation Enterprises (1985) had observed "the scope of fair use is narrower with respect to unpublished works," but denied that the unpublished nature of Salinger's letters was decisive. ("[The Supreme Court] stressed the tailoring of fair use analysis to the particular case... It neither stated nor implied a categorical rule barring fair use of unpublished works."

The court went on to note that the meaning of Harper is somewhat ambiguous. Either, they reasoned, there are fewer cases in which fair use may be found when the original work is unpublished or less material may be copied from unpublished works. The court ultimately decided that the first was true, and that unpublished works normally have complete protection against any copying of protected expression.

== See also ==
- List of United States Supreme Court cases, volume 471
- List of United States Supreme Court copyright case law
- Nation Magazine v. United States Department of Defense
- Brooks Thomas
