= James J. Storrow Jr. =

American film producer and magazine publisher (1917–1984)

James J. Storrow
- Born: May 7, 1917; Boston, Massachusetts, US
- Died: January 13, 1984 (aged 66); Manhattan, US
- Spouse: Patricia Blake

James Jackson Storrow IV (May 7, 1917 – January 13, 1984) was an American film producer and magazine publisher who published The Nation from 1965 to 1977

== Early life ==
Storrow was born on May 7, 1917, in Boston. His parents were James J. Storrow, son of James J. Storrow and Helen Storrow, and Margaret Randolph Rotch, daughter of Abbott Lawrence Rotch and Margaret Randolph Rotch. He graduated from the Milton Academy and Harvard College. He served with the Seabees in the Pacific during World War II. After the war, Storrow attended Harvard Business School.

== Business career ==
In 1941, Storrow became an executive with the Baush Machine Tool Company of Springfield, Massachusetts. He left the company in 1943 to join the United States Navy. After the war, Storrow formed two businesses, the General Microfilm Company and the Henry Thayer Company. In 1961, Storrow took over Trident Films, which produced documentaries and two feature films – The Crooked Road and Kid Rodelo.

In 1965, Storrow purchased The Nation from George C. Kirstein. In 1967, The Nation absorbed another progressive publication, Frontier. On November 28, 1976, it was announced that Thomas B. Morgan, former editor of The Village Voice, would purchase The Nation. On December 21, 1976, Storrow and Morgan jointly announced that the deal had fallen through and the sale would not take place. One year later, Storrow sold the magazine to a group of investors led by Hamilton Fish V.

== Personal life and death ==
Storrow married Patricia Blake in 1940. They had three sons – Gerald Blake Storrow, Peter Storrow, and Arthur Rotch Storrow (who changed his name to James Jackson Storrow III), and one daughter Margaret Randolph Storrow. Patricia Storrow died in 1962 and later that year, Storrow married Linda Eder Jamieson.

Storrow died of a heart ailment on January 13, 1984, at his home in Manhattan.
