= Nation Magazine v. United States Department of Defense =

Nation Magazine v. U.S. Dep't of Defense
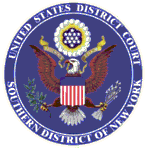
- Court: United States District Court for the Southern District of New York
- Citation: 762 F. Supp. 1558 (S.D.N.Y. 1991)

Case history
- Subsequent action: N/A

Court membership
- Judge sitting: Leonard B. Sand

Case opinions
- Ruling stated that the issue was moot and did not address its constitutionality

In 1990, the United States Department of Defense implemented press pools so they could control and monitor the press during the Gulf War. The competition into the press pools was intense and if a publication wasn't a member of the pool, they were unable to gain access to the warzones and could not fully cover the war. Furthermore, the Dept. of Defense determined where pool members were able to travel and what stories they would be able to report on; pool member journalists had to remain with escorts at all times, and stories were reviewed by a military official before being published. On January 10, 1991, Nation Magazine sued the Dept. of Defense, claiming its pooling regulations had violated the First Amendment and Fifth Amendment. The complaint had more to do with limited access than with news censorship.

== Background ==
The Gulf War was a sixth month conflict between Iraq and 30 nations led by the United States in order to liberate Kuwait. It was a very highly televised conflict, but the press was restricted in its access of information.

The Nation Magazine is a weekly magazine dedicated to reports on politics and culture. It is the oldest continuously published weekly magazine in the United States and calls itself "The Flagship of the Left."

Press pools were first implemented in the Russo-Japanese War in 1904, and first in the United States in the Panama Invasion in 1989. According to Matthew J. Jacobs' essay "Assessing the Constitutionality of Press Restrictions in the Persian Gulf War," the press often voiced three complaints: 1) Because of the small number of spots in the Gulf War press pools, not all publications' crew members had access to the pools and small, offbeat publications had no access whatsoever. 2) The military continued to closely survey those in the pool; it was as if the press pools were "prearranged field trips." 3) The military used the pool system as rewards and punishments to journalists, giving them access or denying them access based on what they had written before.

== The case ==
The Nation Magazine filed suit against the United States Department of Defense, saying that the press pools violated their First and Fifth Amendment rights, emphasizing that press pools infringe of their news gathering privileges bestowed upon them by the First Amendment. They argued that the press had a First Amendment right to unlimited access in a foreign arena where U.S. forces are involved. They also argued that they are serving the American public, which has a right to know the affairs of the U.S. military.

The Department of Defense argued that the First Amendment does not restrict them from barring journalists from the battlefield and claimed that the primary purpose of the press pools is to develop "a cooperative arrangement designed to balance the media's desire for unilateral coverage with...the responsibility to maintain operational security, protect the safety of the troops, and prevent interference with military operations" (The Nation Magazine v. U.S. Dep't of Defense, 762 F. Supp. 1558 S.D.N.Y. 1991).

The South District Court of New York had to determine three things applied to make a ruling on the case: First, that the plaintiffs (the Nation) had "standing." A plaintiff has standing if he "has suffered an actual or threatened injury which is fairly traceable to the defendant's conduct and which is likely to be redressed by a favorable decision." The Court found that "distinct and palpable" claims and there was "no question" the Nation was denied access to press pools. Thus, the Court concluded the plaintiffs had sufficient standing.

Secondly, the court had to determine whether the judicial branch was qualified under the Constitution's separation of power to rule on this issue, which designate military regulations delegated to the legislative and executive branches. According to a case a few years prior, courts should "hesitate long before entertaining a suit which asks the court to tamper with the . . . necessarily unique structure of the Military Establishment." (Chappell v. Wallace, 462 U.S. 296, 300, 76 L. Ed. 2d 586, 103 S. Ct. 2362 1983). This court found that even though the Department of Justice designed these regulations, it does not render the plaintiff's claim un-justiciable, and that this court was able to rule on the case since it relates mostly to the press and not the actual affairs of the military overseas. Thus, the court was on the road to siding with the press.

Lastly, the Court had to find that the plaintiff's complaint was not moot. At this point, the press pools had been lifted (as of March 4, 1991) so the Court decided they would rule on the constitutionality of the issue when "the controversy is more sharply focused." Generally, a case becomes moot when the issues presented no longer matter or both parties involved lack serious interest in a court decision. Thus, the Court dismissed the complaint, rendering it moot.

The press urged that the First Amendment gives the press a right of access to report on news which affects the United States public. The Court called this issue "charting new constitutional territory" since no other case has decidedly addressed it. Through reasoning, the court stated that the military has rights to restrict access to government controlled institutions like prisons and military bases. On the other hand, the court said, "there is an almost absolute right of access to open places, including such fora as streets and parks." The Court hesitantly stated that the press seems to have "minimal right of access to view and report on major events that affect the functioning of government, including...an overt combat operation." Thus, the government cannot fully restrict the press. However, the court stated that they could not make a ruling, and would wait to decide more deeply on this topic when the issue was more focused.

Prof. Stephen Cooper, in his 2003 article, "Press Controls in Wartime: The Legal, Historical, and Institutional Context," notes, "While no mainstream news organization chose to challenge the press restrictions in court, the list of plaintiffs in Nation Magazine is something of a who’s-who of the American progressive journalism world. Joined in this suit are Nation , Harper’s, In These Times, Pacific News Service, The Guardian, The Progressive, Mother Jones, The L.A. Weekly, The Village Voice, The Texas Observer, Pacifica Radio News, Sydney H. Schanberg, E. L. Doctorow, William Styron, Michael Klare, and Scott Armstrong, plus a separate lawsuit filed by Agence France-Presse. The list of interested parties with amicus curiae briefs included thirteen members of Congress, the American Civil Liberties Union, Fairness and Accuracy in Reporting, and academics Ben Bagdikian, Todd Gitlin, and Herbert I. Schiller, among others. The defendants included Secretary of Defense Richard Cheney, Assistant Secretary of Defense for Public Affairs Peter Williams, Chairman of the Joint Chiefs of Staff General Colin Powell, and President of the United States and Commander-in-Chief of the Armed Forces George Bush."

== The decision ==
Judge Sand ruled that the issue was moot and that he could not rule on its constitutionality at the time. There have been no cases since then that have ruled explicitly on the constitutionality of press pools. He said even if the Department of Defense can prove the necessity of press pools for security reasons, they must implement the pools in a non-discriminatory manner.

== See also ==
- Harper & Row v. Nation Enterprises (1985)
