= Boardwalk (film) =

1979 film by Stephen Verona

- Directed by: Stephen Verona
- Written by: Leigh Chapman; Stephen Verona
- Produced by: George Willoughby
- Starring: Ruth Gordon; Lee Strasberg; Janet Leigh
- Cinematography: Billy Williams
- Edited by: Thom Noble
- Music by: William S. Fischer; Michael Kamen; Rob Mounsey; Coleridge-Taylor Perkinson
- Production companies: Stratford; Travellers Films
- Distributed by: Atlantic Releasing Corporation
- Release date: November 14, 1979
- Running time: 98 minutes
- Country: United States
- Language: English

Boardwalk is a 1979 American drama film written by Stephen Verona and Leigh Chapman and directed by Verona. It stars Ruth Gordon, Lee Strasberg and Janet Leigh. It follows an older Jewish couple living in Coney Island that are challenged by increasing crime in their neighborhood.

== Plot summary ==
David Rosen (Strasberg) and his wife Becky (Gordon) are approaching their 50th wedding anniversary in Coney Island, where they have spent most of their married life. But their beloved once-safe neighborhood begins to fall victim to urban blight and crime with house robberies commonplace and the boardwalk rendered unsafe by gangs. A gang leader named Strut demands payment from local merchants for "protection" and uses violent methods to achieve his objectives. David refuses to pay for the "protection" for his restaurant and as a consequence it is firebombed, while many of his neighbors are attacked and his synagogue is desecrated. The couple also contend with Becky's cancer, while their widowed daughter, Florence (Leigh) is in a loveless marriage with a vinyl floor salesman. Peter, Florence's 24-year-old son, wants to be rock star. The Friedmans, an older Jewish couple and best friends of David and Becky, feel besieged by the threat of violent crime and decide to take their own lives.

== Cast ==
- Ruth Gordon as Becky Rosen
- Lee Strasberg as David Rosen
- Janet Leigh as Florence Cohen
- Joe Silver as Leo Rosen
- Eddie Barth as Eli Rosen
- Merwin Goldsmith as Charley
- Michael Ayr as Peter
- Forbesy Russell as Marilyn
- Chevi Colton as Vera Rosen
- Teri Keane as Betty Rosen
- Eli Mintz as Friedman
- Rashel Novikoff as Sadie
- Lillian Roth as Ruth
- Kim Delgado as Strut
- Altovise Davis as Mrs. Bell

== Production ==
It was filmed on location at numerous spots in Brooklyn, including the famous but now defunct Dubrow's Cafeteria.

Strasberg spoke to The New York Times about challenging perceptions of older characters on screen: "That's the difficulty of playing older people...The audience doesn't see them as people, but as old people. They think you have to act old. But old people don't not make love; they don't not have feelings. Aging is like wine: give me old wine — it's more enriching. What appealed to me about the characters in ‘Boardwalk’ was that I didn't have to play David as decrepit or do the phony Jewish thing with the accent."

Gordon spoke about her positive experience acting alongside Strasberg: "From the very word go, it was chemistry. We loved each other. That's why we worked together.” With Strasberg adding, “I guess we do share something in the theater, don't we?...I remember seeing you in ‘Serena Blandish’ — that was the kind of theater I loved as a young actor. You know, we went through those years of the American theater when it was just becoming a world theater."

It was written by Leigh Chapman and Verona, who were a couple at the time. Chapman later recalled the film as "Amateurish? boring? Strasberg [was] a dreadful actor...I give V[erona] credit for tenacity...[a] British investor who put up the money for the film. He was one of those 'commoner' Brits who created a travel agency and made a lot of money. I don't know how Verona met him or conned him into putting up the money."

== Reception ==
Vincent Canby of The New York Times wrote "Boardwalk is otherwise a movie of unrelieved, unexplored gloom". He criticized Verona's direction: "Mr. Verona also has no idea how to write individual scenes or how to allow characters to develop at their own speed. The movie proceeds in bits and pieces of sequences that undercut the actors, at the same time revealing the absence of anything faintly resembling a director's unifying vision." However, Canby praised the cast for their performances, "The only thing the movie has going for it is a cast of good actors. Mr. Strasberg, Miss Gordon and Miss Leigh provide their roles with depths of feelings that come out of their own resources, certainly not the director's or the writers'. The supporting roles are nicely handled by Joe Silver, Eli Mintz, Eddie Barth and Merwin Goldsmith, while Lillian Roth makes a brief, sweet appearance as a lonely Jewish widow. Linda Manz ("Days of Heaven") wanders on and off as an anonymous member of the street gang, which is so carefully integrated you might suspect that Brooklyn now runs a busing program for muggers."
