= The Nation =

American monthly political magazine

- The Nation, cover dated January 2026
- Editor: Katrina vanden Heuvel
- Former editors: Edwin Lawrence Godkin; Victor Navasky; Norman Thomas (associate editor); Carey McWilliams; Freda Kirchwey
- Categories: Politics
- Frequency: Monthly
- Publisher: Katrina vanden Heuvel
- Total circulation: 100,000 (2026)
- First issue: July 6, 1865; 161 years ago
- Company: The Nation Company, L.P.
- Country: United States
- Based in: New York City, U.S.
- Website: thenation.com
- ISSN: 0027-8378
- OCLC: 1643268

The Nation is a left-leaning and progressive American monthly magazine. It covers politics and culture and bills itself as "the flagship of the left". The Nation was once the oldest weekly magazine in the US, but is now published on a monthly basis. It publishes articles by various high-profile American academics and activists. Jacobin founder Bhaskar Sunkara is the president of the magazine.

It was founded on July 6, 1865, as a successor to William Lloyd Garrison's The Liberator, an abolitionist newspaper that closed in 1865, after ratification of the Thirteenth Amendment to the United States Constitution. Thereafter, the magazine proceeded to a broader topic, The Nation. An important collaborator of the new magazine was its Literary Editor Wendell Phillips Garrison, son of William. He had at his disposal his father's vast network of contacts.

The Nation is published by its namesake owner, The Nation Company, L.P., at 520 8th Ave New York, NY 10018. It has news bureaus in Washington, D.C., London, and South Africa, with departments covering architecture, art, corporations, defense, environment, films, legal affairs, music, peace and disarmament, poetry, and the United Nations. Circulation peaked at 187,000 in 2006 but dropped to 145,000 in print by 2010. By 2026, the magazine reported a total circulation of 100,000.

== History ==
=== Founding and journalistic roots ===
The Nation was established on July 6, 1865, at 130 Nassau Street ("Newspaper Row") in Manhattan. Its founding coincided with the closure of the abolitionist newspaper The Liberator, also in 1865, after slavery was abolished by the Thirteenth Amendment to the United States Constitution; a group of abolitionists, led by the landscape architect Frederick Law Olmsted, desired to found a new weekly political magazine. Edwin Lawrence Godkin, who had been considering starting such a magazine for some time, agreed and so became the first editor of The Nation.

Its founding publisher was Joseph H. Richards; the editor was Godkin, an immigrant from Ireland who had formerly worked as a correspondent of the London Daily News and The New York Times. Godkin sought to establish what one sympathetic commentator later characterized as "an organ of opinion characterized in its utterance by breadth and deliberation, an organ which should identify itself with causes, and which should give its support to parties primarily as representative of these causes".

In its "founding prospectus" the magazine wrote that the publication would have "seven main objects" with the first being "discussion of the topics of the day, and, above all, of legal, economical, and constitutional questions, with greater accuracy and moderation than are now to be found in the daily press". The Nation pledged to "not be the organ of any party, sect or body" but rather to "make an earnest effort to bring to discussion of political and social questions a really critical spirit, and to wage war upon the vices of violence, exaggeration and misrepresentation by which so much of the political writing of the day is marred".

In the first year of publication, one of the magazine's regular features was The South as It Is. The magazine published eyewitness accounts of the Reconstruction era of southern states.

Among the causes supported by the publication in its earliest days was civil service reform—moving the basis of government employment from a political patronage system to a professional bureaucracy based upon meritocracy. The Nation also was preoccupied with the reestablishment of a sound national currency in the years after the American Civil War, arguing that a stable currency was necessary to restore the economic stability of the nation. Closely related to this was the publication's advocacy of the elimination of protective tariffs in favor of lower prices of consumer goods associated with a free trade system.

=== From 1880s literary supplement to 1930s New Deal booster ===
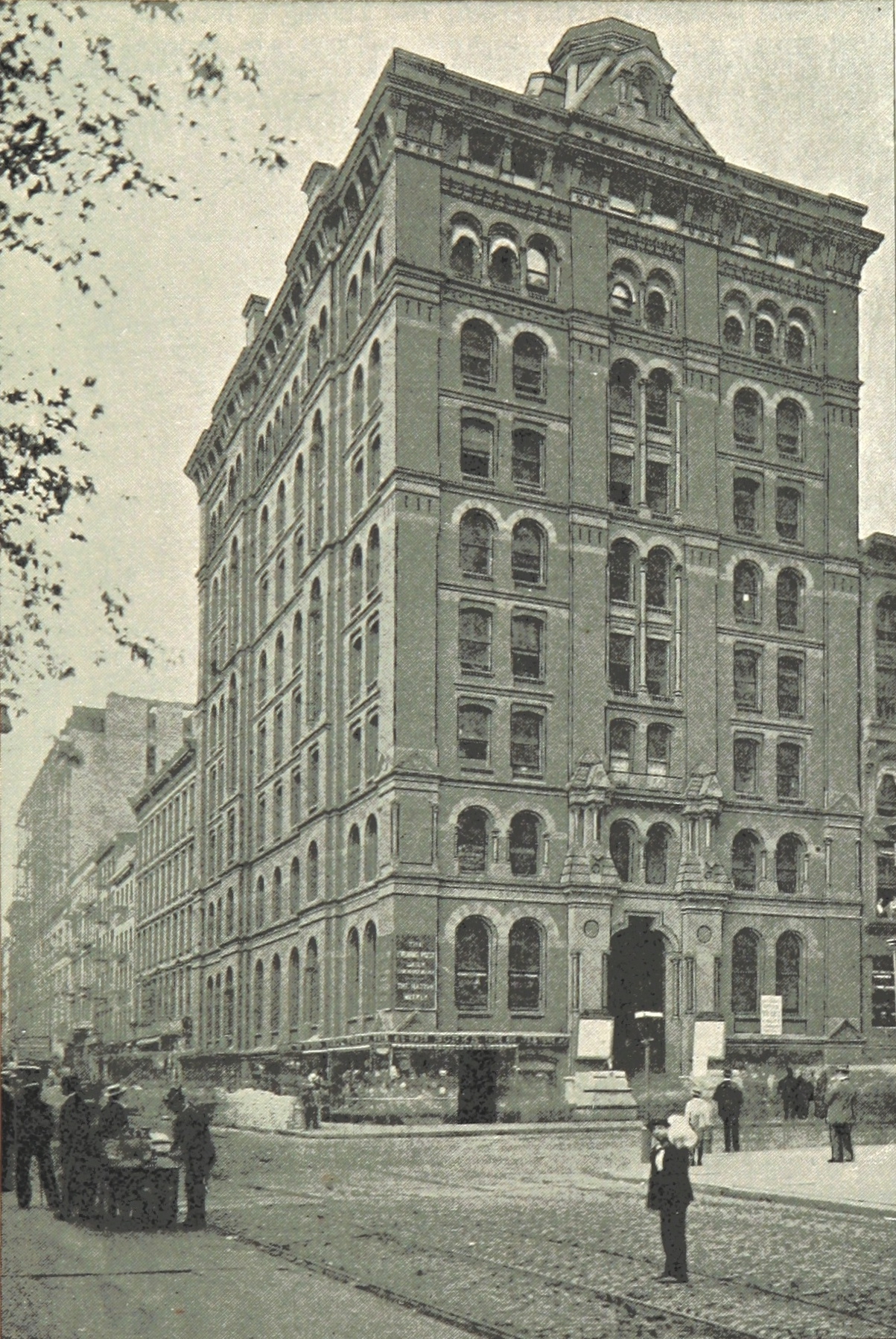
The Evening Post and The Nation, 210 Broadway, Manhattan, New York

In June 1881, The Nation was acquired by journalist Henry Villard. Afterwards, the magazine was printed in conjunction with New York Evening Post (now New York Post), which at the time held liberal views.

After Henry Villard died, the publications were inherited by his son; Oswald Garrison Villard. Villard's ideology and the editorial stance of The Nation shared many similarities; both were advocating for racial equality and isolationism. In July 1918, Villard announced that The Nation will be separate from the newspaper and stop reprinting articles of the New York Evening Post. Villard made this decision because he believed that reprinting practice gave readers the impression that The Nation was a weekly publication of the New York Evening Post.

As the 1932 U.S. presidential election approached, The Nation saw no real choice between Hoover and Roosevelt, and it urged readers to vote for Socialist Party of America candidate Norman Thomas. Oswald Villard wrote: "So I insist, the man who votes for either Hoover or Roosevelt is the one who is throwing away his vote... He is again postponing the peaceful revolution which Woodrow Wilson said in 1912 was on the horizon." The magazine did, however, endorse Roosevelt in the next three elections.

Oswald Villard welcomed the New Deal and supported the nationalization of industries—thus reversing the meaning of "liberalism" as the founders of The Nation would have understood the term, from a belief in a smaller and more restricted government to a belief in a larger and less restricted government. Villard sold the magazine in 1935 to "The Nation Fund, Inc", a nonprofit corporation established by banker Maurice Wertheim. In 1937, Wertheim sold The Nation to editor Freda Kirchwey, who said she bought it because she intended to turn the magazine into a "voice of leftism".

Almost every editor of The Nation from Villard's time to the 1970s was looked at for "subversive" activities and ties. When Albert Jay Nock published a column criticizing Samuel Gompers and trade unions for being complicit in the war machine of the First World War, The Nation was briefly suspended from the US mail.

=== World War II and early Cold War ===
The magazine's financial problems in the early 1940s prompted Kirchwey to sell her individual ownership of the magazine in 1943, creating a nonprofit organization; Nation Associates, out of the money generated from a recruiting drive of sponsors. This organization was also responsible for academic affairs, including conducting research and organizing conferences, that had been a part of the early history of the magazine. Nation Associates became responsible for the operation and publication of the magazine on a nonprofit basis, with Kirchwey as both president of Nation Associates and editor of The Nation.

Before the attack on Pearl Harbor, The Nation repeatedly called on the United States to enter World War II to resist fascism, and after the US entered the war, the publication supported the American war effort. Furthermore, unlike other leftist publications and organizations which followed a close Stalinist line in keeping with the Molotov-Ribbentrop Pact, The Nation supported American intervention in the war before Operation Barbarossa. It also supported the use of the atomic bomb on Hiroshima.

In January 1942, The Holocaust committed by Nazi Germany received almost no attention from the global media. The Nation was one of the few publications that reported on the crimes committed against Jews during this period; it published multiple articles by Rabbi Philip S. Bernstein, who explained the events that took place in the concentration camps run by the Schutzstaffel. The Nation advocated for the United States to provide refuge to German Jewry.

Freda Kirchwey openly supported the idea of banning the fascist press, which earned her the enmity of liberals, including her long-time friend Norman Thomas who said: "In ten years or less it won't be the people you want to suppress now who will be suppressed and stay suppressed by your theory; it will be yourselves along with many others".

In the 1950s, The Nation was attacked by critics as "pro-communist" because of its advocacy of détente with the expansionist Soviet Union of Joseph Stalin, and its criticism of McCarthyism. One of the magazine's writers, Louis Fischer, resigned from the magazine afterwards, claiming The Nation's foreign coverage was too pro-Soviet. Despite this, Diana Trilling pointed out that Kirchwey did allow anti-Soviet writers, such as herself, to contribute material critical of Russia to the magazine's arts section.

During McCarthyism (the Second Red Scare), The Nation was banned from several school libraries in New York City and Newark, and a Bartlesville, Oklahoma, librarian, Ruth Brown, was fired from her job in 1950, after a citizens committee complained she had given shelf space to The Nation. In 1957, Fidel Castro wrote an article for The Nation, titled; "What Cuba's Rebels Want". A year later, the magazine published an article discussing the possibility of US invading Cuba; it predicted the Bay of Pigs invasion.

In 1950, The Nation published a report describing the United Fruit Company as "an obstacle of progress in Central America". The company's president, Sam Zemurray, disputed the characterization, yet after retiring the following year he became a substantial benefactor of the magazine at a time when it had fallen on hard times. In 1955, George Kirstein replaced Freda Kirchway as magazine owner. James J. Storrow Jr. bought the magazine from Kirstein in 1965.

=== 1970s to 2024 ===
On the eve of the 1968 U.S. presidential election the magazine argued that the choice between Nixon and Humphrey was such a bad one that voters should stay home. In June 1979, The Nation's publisher Hamilton Fish moved the magazine to 72 Fifth Avenue, in Manhattan. The Nation's current address is 33 Irving Place in New York.

In 1977, a group organized by Hamilton Fish V bought the magazine from the Storrow family. In 1985, the magazine was sold to for undiscosed amount to "The Nation Co", headed by millionaire Arthur Carter and two former owners of The Nation.

In March 1991, The Nation together with Center for Constitutional Rights sued Department of Defense for allegedly violating First Amendment and Fifth Amendment for creating press pools during Gulf War. Judge Leonard B. Sand ruled the case moot. In 1995, veteran editor Victor Navasky and a group of investors that included Paul Newman acquired the magazine. Navasky became the magazine's publisher and editorial director. In 1995, Katrina vanden Heuvel succeeded Navasky as editor of The Nation. In 2005, she became the magazine's editor and publisher.

"In an era of instant, 140-character news cycles and reflexive toeing of the party line, it's incredible to think of the 150-year history of The Nation. It's more than a magazine - it's a crucible of ideas forged in the time of Emancipation, tempered through depression and war and the civil-rights movement, and honed as sharp and relevant as ever in an age of breathtaking technological and economic change."

— Barack Obama, per Politico

In 2015, The Nation celebrated its 150th anniversary with a documentary film by Academy Award–winning director Barbara Kopple, which analyzed the magazine's history. The Nation also held a celebration in St. Ann's Warehouse in Brooklyn, which was attended by Tony Kushner, Bill de Blasio, Walter Mosley and Michael Moore. To mark the anniversary, former US President Barack Obama wrote a letter praising The Nation but noting that he disagreed with some of the magazine's views. Editor of The Nation, D. D. Guttenplan wrote a biography of the magazine entitled The Nation: A Biography (The First 150 Years). History News Network said that the biography "has played, and continues to play, an important role in U.S. history, society, and politics".

In January 2016, The Nation endorsed Vermont Senator Bernie Sanders for President for the third time in its history. The editorial board professed; "Voters can trust Sanders because he doesn't owe his political career to the financial overlords of the status quo. Freed from these chains of special interest, he can take the bold measures that the country needs". On June 15, 2019, vanden Heuvel stepped down as editor; D. D. Guttenplan, the editor-at-large, took her place. On August 1, 2025, vanden Heuvel once again became editor.

On February 23, 2022, The Nation named Jacobin founder Bhaskar Sunkara its new president. In an interview, Sunkara said that he believes liberalism and socialism need to form a coalition to ensure progress and him becoming a president of The Nation was one way towards this goal. In December 2023, Sunkara announced the magazine would be switching from a biweekly format to a larger monthly publication.

== Finances ==
Print ad pages declined by 5% from 2009 to 2010, while digital advertising rose 32.8% from 2009 to 2010. Advertising accounts for 10% of total revenue for the magazine, while circulation totals 60%. The Nation has lost money in all but three or four years of operation and is sustained in part by a group of more than 30,000 donors called Nation Associates, who donate funds to the periodical above and beyond their annual subscription fees. This program accounts for 30% of the total revenue for the magazine. An annual cruise also generates $200,000 for the magazine. Since late 2012, the Nation Associates program has been called Nation Builders.

In 2023, the magazine had approximately 91,000 subscribers, roughly 80% of whom pay for the print magazine. Adding sales from newsstands, The Nation had a total circulation of 96,000 copies per issue in 2021, earning the majority of its revenue from subscriptions and donations, rather than print advertising.

== Poetry ==
Since its creation, The Nation has published significant works of American poetry, including works by Hart Crane, Eli Siegel, Elizabeth Bishop, and Adrienne Rich, as well as W. S. Merwin, Pablo Neruda, Denise Levertov, and Derek Walcott.

In 2018, the magazine published a poem entitled "How-To" by Anders Carlson-Wee which was written in the voice of a homeless man and used black vernacular. This led to criticism from writers such as Roxane Gay because Carlson-Wee is white. The Nation's two poetry editors, Stephanie Burt and Carmen Giménez Smith, issued an apology for publishing the poem, the first such action ever taken by the magazine. The apology itself became an object of criticism also. Poet and Nation columnist Katha Pollitt called the apology "craven" and likened it to a letter written from "a reeducation camp". Grace Schulman, The Nation's poetry editor from 1971 to 2006, wrote that the apology represented a disturbing departure from the magazine's traditionally broad conception of artistic freedom.

== Regular columns ==
The magazine runs a number of regular columns:

- "Beneath the Radar" by Gary Younge
- "Deadline Poet" by Calvin Trillin
- "Diary of a Mad Law Professor" by Patricia J. Williams
- "The Liberal Media" by Eric Alterman
- "Subject to Debate" by Katha Pollitt
- "Between the Lines" by Laila Lalami

Regular columns in the past have included:

- "Look Out" by Naomi Klein
- "Sister Citizen" by Melissa Harris-Perry
- "Beat the Devil" (1984–2012) by Alexander Cockburn
- "Dispatches" (1984–87) by Max Holland and Kai Bird
- "Minority Report" (1982–2002) by Christopher Hitchens
- "The Nation cryptic crossword" by Frank W. Lewis from 1947 to 2009, and Joshua Kosman and Henri Picciotto from 2011 to 2020, that is now available by subscription

== See also ==
- Nation Books
- Harper & Row v. Nation Enterprises
- Jacobin
- Modern liberalism in the United States
- Mother Jones
- Nation Magazine v. United States Department of Defense
