= Kid Rodelo =

1966 film by Richard Carlson

- Directed by: Richard Carlson
- Written by: Jack Natteford
- Story by: Louis L'Amour
- Produced by: Jack Lamont; James J. Storrow Jr.
- Starring: Don Murray; Janet Leigh; Broderick Crawford
- Cinematography: Manuel Merino
- Edited by: Allan Morrison
- Music by: Johnny Douglas
- Production companies: Fénix Cooperativa Cinematográfica; Trident Films
- Distributed by: Paramount Pictures
- Release date: January 1, 1966
- Running time: 91 minutes
- Countries: United States; Spain
- Language: English

Kid Rodelo is a 1966 Western film directed by Richard Carlson and starring Don Murray, Janet Leigh and Broderick Crawford. Based on a 1966 novel by Louis L'Amour, it was a co-production between Spain and the United States. Shooting took place in Spain around Alicante and the capital Madrid.

== Plot ==
After serving time in prison, a cowboy searches for fifty thousand dollars in gold.

== Cast ==
- Don Murray as Kid Rodelo
- Janet Leigh as Nora
- Broderick Crawford as Joe Harbin
- Richard Carlson as Link
- Jose Nieto as Thomas Reese
- Miguel del Castillo as Chavas
- Jose Villasante as Cavalry Hat
- Julio Peña as Balsas
- Fernando Hilbeck as Perryman
- Mike Brendel

== production ==
The film's song "Love is Trouble" is sung by lead actor Don Murray. The screenplay was based on a story by Louis L'Amour. Filming took place in Spain.

== Bibliography ==
- Pitts, Michael R. Western Movies: A Guide to 5,105 Feature Films. McFarland, 2012.
