= The Romance of Rosy Ridge =

1947 film by Roy Rowland

- Theatrical release poster
- Directed by: Roy Rowland
- Screenplay by: Lester Cole
- Based on: The Romance of Rosy Ridge; 1937 novel by MacKinlay Kantor
- Produced by: Jack Cummings
- Starring: Van Johnson; Thomas Mitchell; Marshall Thompson; Selena Royle; Dean Stockwell; Janet Leigh
- Cinematography: Sidney Wagner
- Edited by: Ralph E. Winters
- Music by: George Bassman
- Color process: Black and white
- Production company: Metro-Goldwyn-Mayer
- Distributed by: Metro-Goldwyn-Mayer
- Release date: August 4, 1947
- Running time: 106 minutes
- Country: United States
- Language: English
- Budget: $2,117,000
- Box office: $2,445,000

The Romance of Rosy Ridge is a 1947 American Western film directed by Roy Rowland, about a rural community bitterly divided during the aftermath of the American Civil War. It stars Van Johnson, Thomas Mitchell, and Janet Leigh in her film debut. It was adapted from the novel of the same name by MacKinlay Kantor.

== Plot ==
Months after the end of the Civil War, Henry Carson, a schoolteacher before the war, walks through a rural region of the Missouri hills. He spends the night with the MacBean family: farmer Gill, his wife Sairy, and two of their children, young woman Lissy Anne and youngster Andrew. Another son, Ben, had run off to fight in the war; the family's hope that he is alive and will someday return is gradually waning.

Gill does not welcome the stranger, unsure of his allegiance, but the others like the good-natured young man, especially Lissy Anne. Henry offers to help with the farming; the MacBeans desperately need more hands, but Gill remains very suspicious of his motives. Rival bands are burning the barns of those who supported the wrong (in their eyes) side; the MacBeans are the latest victims. Henry, however, proves to be a hard worker.

When storekeeper and unofficial banker Cal Baggett visits the family to ask about repayment of a loan, Henry talks him into hosting a "play party", inviting everyone, regardless of affiliation, to help heal the rift in the community. Gill is strongly opposed to it, but Henry tricks him into bringing his family.

At first, the two groups do not mix, but Sairy talks Northern sympathizer Dan Yeary into dancing with her, breaking the ice. Soon, everyone is having a very good time. However, an argument breaks out about the playing of a tune associated with the North. To forestall a fight, Cal calls for a vote. Unfortunately, it is a tie. Gill calls upon Henry to cast the deciding vote. Henry is finally forced to reveal that he fought for the Union. After that, the party quickly breaks up, much to the secret delight of John Dessark and his son Badge.

Henry is no longer welcome at the MacBeans. He does not leave the area though; he starts building a schoolhouse.

Eventually, Lissy Anne can no longer bear to be apart from Henry. She walks away into the night with him, without her father's knowledge but with her mother's approval. Gill tracks them down with a bloodhound, intending to shoot his would-be son-in-law. When five masked nightriders approach, Henry knocks Gill unconscious and seizes his rifle. The horsemen start shooting to kill. Taking cover Henry kills four and captures the fifth after a lengthy foot chase and fistfight at a burnt-out dwelling. It is Badge Dessark. He confesses that his father is behind the raids, not out of loyalty to the South, but simply for financial profit. With the Dessarks hanged, the community starts to heal.

Finally, Henry reveals why he secretly sought out the MacBeans. In a flashback, he says that he first met Ben as they were walking across the hills to enlist in the war. As they traveled together singing and laughing, they became good friends. Approaching the turn-off signpost they decided in jest on a foot race to see who could be the first to reach it. Henry ended up on the north branch, with Ben on the south. They were stunned by their differing allegiances. Henry ultimately persuaded Ben into coming with him. Two days before the war's end, Ben was killed suddenly. Before dying, he made Henry promise to help the family with the harvest. After hearing this, a teary-eyed Gill gives Henry and Lissy Anne his blessing to get married.

== Cast ==
- Van Johnson as Henry Carson
- Thomas Mitchell as Gill MacBean
- Janet Leigh as Lissy Anne MacBean
- Marshall Thompson as Ben MacBean
- Selena Royle as Sairy MacBean
- Charles Dingle as John Dessark
- Dean Stockwell as Andrew MacBean
- Guy Kibbee as Cal Baggett
- Elisabeth Risdon as Emily Baggett
- Jim Davis as Badge Dessark
- Russell Simpson as Dan Yeary
- O.Z. Whitehead as Ninny Nat
- James Bell as John Willhart
- Joyce Arling as Mrs. Willhart
- William Bishop as Ad Buchanan
- Paul Langton as Tom Veary

== Reception ==
According to MGM records, the film earned $1,820,000 in the US and Canada and $625,000 elsewhere, resulting in a loss of $533,000.

== See also ==
- List of American films of 1947
